= List of municipalities in the Canary Islands =

This is a list of all the municipalities in the autonomous community of the Canary Islands, Spain.

== Province of Tenerife ==
=== La Gomera ===
- Agulo
- Alajeró
- Hermigua
- San Sebastián de La Gomera
- Vallehermoso
- Valle Gran Rey

=== El Hierro ===
- La Frontera
- El Pinar
- Valverde

=== La Palma ===
- Barlovento
- Breña Alta
- Breña Baja
- Fuencaliente de La Palma
- Garafía
- Los Llanos de Aridane
- El Paso
- Puntagorda
- Puntallana
- San Andrés y Sauces
- Santa Cruz de La Palma
- Tazacorte
- Tijarafe
- Villa de Mazo

=== Tenerife ===
- Adeje
- Arafo
- Arico
- Arona
- Buenavista del Norte
- Candelaria
- Fasnia
- Garachico
- Granadilla de Abona
- La Guancha
- Guía de Isora
- Güímar
- Icod de los Vinos
- La Matanza de Acentejo
- La Orotava
- Puerto de la Cruz
- Los Realejos
- El Rosario
- San Cristóbal de La Laguna
- San Juan de la Rambla
- San Miguel de Abona
- Santa Cruz de Tenerife
- Santa Úrsula
- Santiago del Teide
- El Sauzal
- Los Silos
- Tacoronte
- El Tanque
- Tegueste
- La Victoria de Acentejo
- Vilaflor

== Province of Las Palmas ==
=== Fuerteventura ===
- Antigua
- Betancuria
- La Oliva (includes Lobos Island)
- Pájara
- Puerto del Rosario
- Tuineje

=== Gran Canaria ===
- Agaete
- Agüimes
- La Aldea de San Nicolás
- Artenara
- Arucas
- Firgas
- Gáldar
- Ingenio
- Las Palmas de Gran Canaria
- Mogán
- Moya
- San Bartolomé de Tirajana
- Sta. Brígida
- Sta. Lucía de Tirajana
- Santa María de Guía
- Tejeda
- Telde
- Teror
- Valleseco
- Valsequillo
- Vega de San Mateo

=== Lanzarote ===
- Arrecife
- Haría
- San Bartolomé
- Teguise (includes Isla de La Graciosa and four smaller islets, including Alegranza)
- Tías
- Tinajo
- Yaiza

The rest of the islets are uninhabited, except La Graciosa, which contains a hamlet, Caleta de Sebo.

== See also ==
- Geography of Spain
- List of cities in Spain
- List of municipalities in Las Palmas
