= List of municipalities in Santa Cruz de Tenerife =

Map of Spain with the province of Santa Cruz de Tenerife highlighted

This is a list of the 54 municipalities in the province of Santa Cruz de Tenerife in the autonomous community of the Canary Islands, Spain - 31 on Tenerife Island, 14 on La Palma Island, 6 on La Gomera Island and 3 on El Hierro Island.

Name	Island	Area (km^{2})	Census Population (2001)	Census Population (2011)	Census Population (2021)	Estimated Population (2023)
Adeje	Tenerife	105.95	20,255	42,886	48,822	50,523
Arafo	Tenerife	33.92	4,995	5,509	5,593	5,760
Arico	Tenerife	178.76	5,824	7,688	8,343	9,049
Arona	Tenerife	81.79	40,826	75,484	83,097	86,497
Buenavista del Norte	Tenerife	67.42	4,972	4,827	4,765	4,720
Candelaria	Tenerife	49.18	14,247	25,928	28,614	28,876
Fasnia	Tenerife	45.11	2,407	2,961	2,821	2,991
Garachico	Tenerife	29.28	5,307	5,035	4,921	4,975
Granadilla de Abona	Tenerife	162.40	21,135	41,209	52,401	55,505
La Guancha	Tenerife	23.77	5,193	5,422	5,528	5,562
Guía de Isora	Tenerife	143.40	14,982	19,734	21,871	22,478
Güímar	Tenerife	102.90	15,271	18,244	21,001	21,558
Icod de los Vinos	Tenerife	95.90	21,748	23,314	23,492	24,117
La Matanza de Acentejo	Tenerife	14.11	7,053	8,677	9,134	9,114
La Orotava	Tenerife	207.31	37,738	41,552	42,546	42,667
Puerto de la Cruz	Tenerife	8.73	26,441	31,349	30,326	31,396
Los Realejos	Tenerife	57.08	33,438	37,517	37,256	37,543
El Rosario	Tenerife	39.43	13,462	17,247	17,559	17,905
San Cristóbal de La Laguna	Tenerife	102.60	128,822	152,025	158,117	159,576
San Juan de la Rambla	Tenerife	20.67	4,782	5,042	4,892	4,939
San Miguel de Abona	Tenerife	42.04	8,398	16,465	22,057	23,007
Santa Cruz de Tenerife	Tenerife	150.56	188,477	204,476	208,103	208,906
Santa Úrsula	Tenerife	22.59	10,803	14,079	15,043	15,282
Santiago del Teide	Tenerife	52.21	9,303	10,689	11,101	12,072
El Sauzal	Tenerife	18.31	7,689	8,988	8,938	9,161
Los Silos	Tenerife	24.23	5,150	4,909	4,694	4,677
Tacoronte	Tenerife	30.09	20,295	23,623	24,365	24,701
El Tanque	Tenerife	23.65	2,966	2,814	2,862	2,810
Tegueste	Tenerife	26.41	9,417	10,908	11,346	11,375
La Victoria de Acentejo	Tenerife	18.36	7,920	8,947	9,172	9,223
Vilaflor de Chasna	Tenerife	56.26	1,718	1,785	1,790	1,850
Tenerife Island	Totals	2,034.42	701,034	879,303	930,570	948,815
Barlovento	La Palma	43.55	2,382	2,067	1,966	1,992
Breña Alta	La Palma	30.82	5,715	7,173	7,223	7,315
Breña Baja	La Palma	14.20	3,621	5,323	5,871	5,966
Fuencaliente de la Palma	La Palma	56.42	1,833	1,841	1,747	1,849
Garafía	La Palma	103.00	1,795	1,566	1,844	1,949
Los Llanos de Aridane	La Palma	35.79	17,720	20,493	20,773	20,375
El Paso	La Palma	135.92	6,764	7,665	7,713	7,972
Puntagorda	La Palma	31.10	1,675	1,730	2,311	2,380
Puntallana	La Palma	35.12	2,337	2,407	2,552	2,612
San Andrés y Sauces	La Palma	42.75	5,351	4,578	4,311	4,301
Santa Cruz de la Palma	La Palma	43.38	17,265	16,568	15,546	15,522
Tazacorte	La Palma	11.37	5,062	4,777	4,510	4,535
Tijarafe	La Palma	53.76	2,730	2,675	2,548	2,632
Villa de Mazo	La Palma	71.17	4,550	4,826	4,897	4,938
La Palma Island	Totals	708.36	78,800	83,689	83,812	84,338
Agulo	La Gomera	25.36	1,127	1,148	1,111	1,123
Alajeró	La Gomera	49.43	1,465	2,005	2,054	2,066
Hermigua	La Gomera	39.67	2,038	2,076	1,851	1,943
San Sebastián de la Gomera	La Gomera	113.59	6,618	8,943	9,313	9,584
Valle Gran Rey	La Gomera	32.36	4,239	4,547	4,632	4,705
Vallehermoso	La Gomera	109.32	2,798	2,961	2,932	2,940
La Gomera Island	Totals	370.03	18,285	21,680	21,893	22,361
Frontera	El Hierro	84.20	4,455	3,984	4,278	4,483
El Pinar	El Hierro	80.66	0	1,750	1,936	2,027
Valverde	El Hierro	103.65	4,227	4,992	5,076	5,149
El Hierro Island	Totals	268.51	8,682	10,736	11,290	11,659

== See also ==
- Geography of Spain
- List of cities in Spain
- List of municipalities in Las Palmas
