= La Gomera =

Canary Island

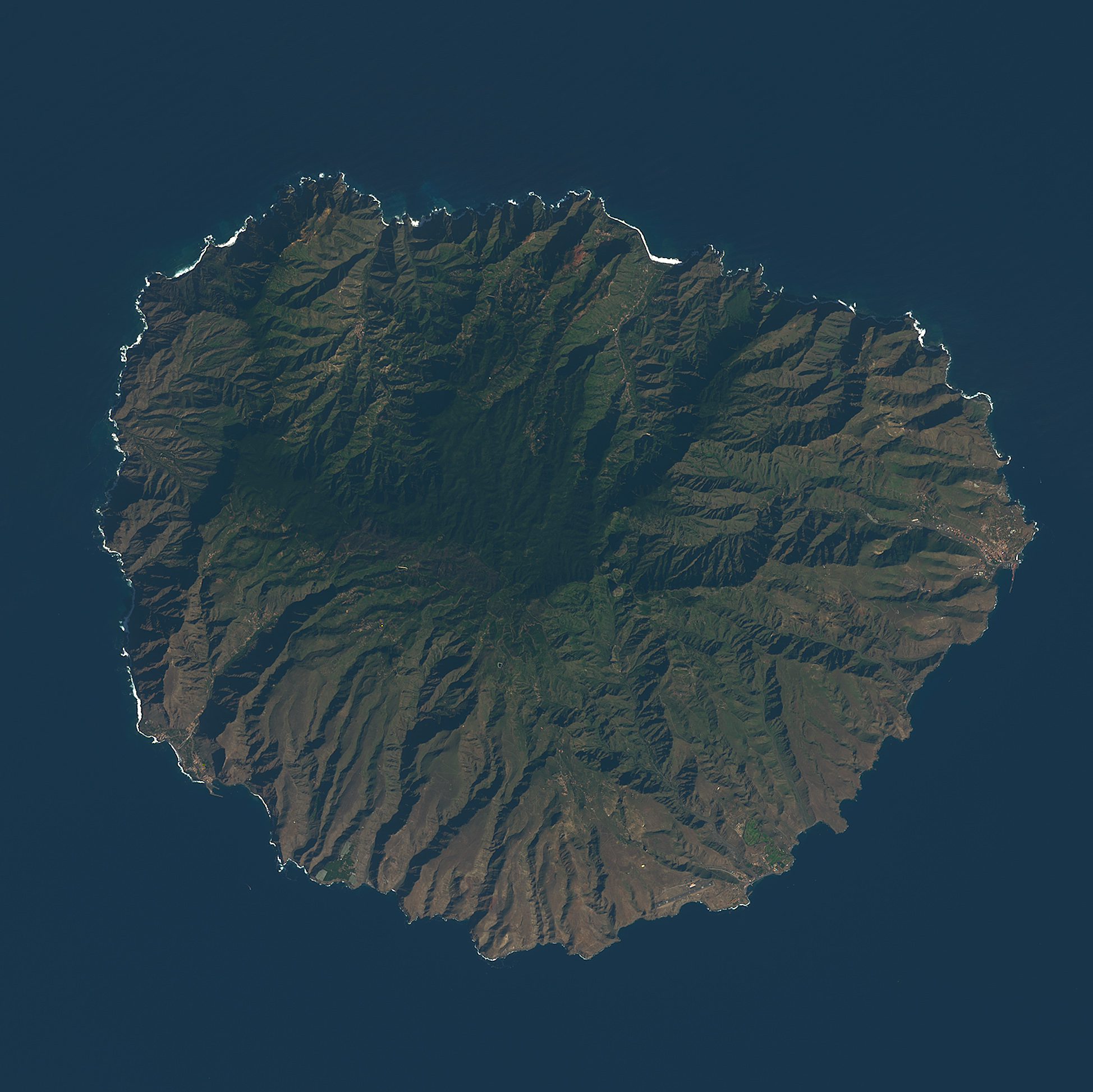
- Satellite view of La Gomera

Geography
- Location: Atlantic Ocean
- Coordinates: 28°06′54″N 17°13′30″W
- Archipelago: Canary Islands
- Area: 370.03 km^{2} (142.87 sq mi)
- Coastline: 100 km (60 mi)
- Highest elevation: 1,487 m (4879 ft)
- Highest point: Garajonay

Administration
- Spain
- Autonomous Community: Canary Islands
- Province: Santa Cruz de Tenerife
- Capital and largest city: San Sebastián de la Gomera (pop. 9,584, in 2023)

Demographics
- Demonym: gomero/-a
- Population: 22,361 (start of 2023)
- Pop. density: 60.43/km^{2} (156.51/sq mi)
- Languages: Spanish (specifically Canarian Spanish) and Silbo Gomero
- Ethnic groups: Spanish, Canary Islanders, other minority groups

Additional information
- Time zone: WET (UTC±00:00)
  - Summer (DST): WEST (UTC+01:00)

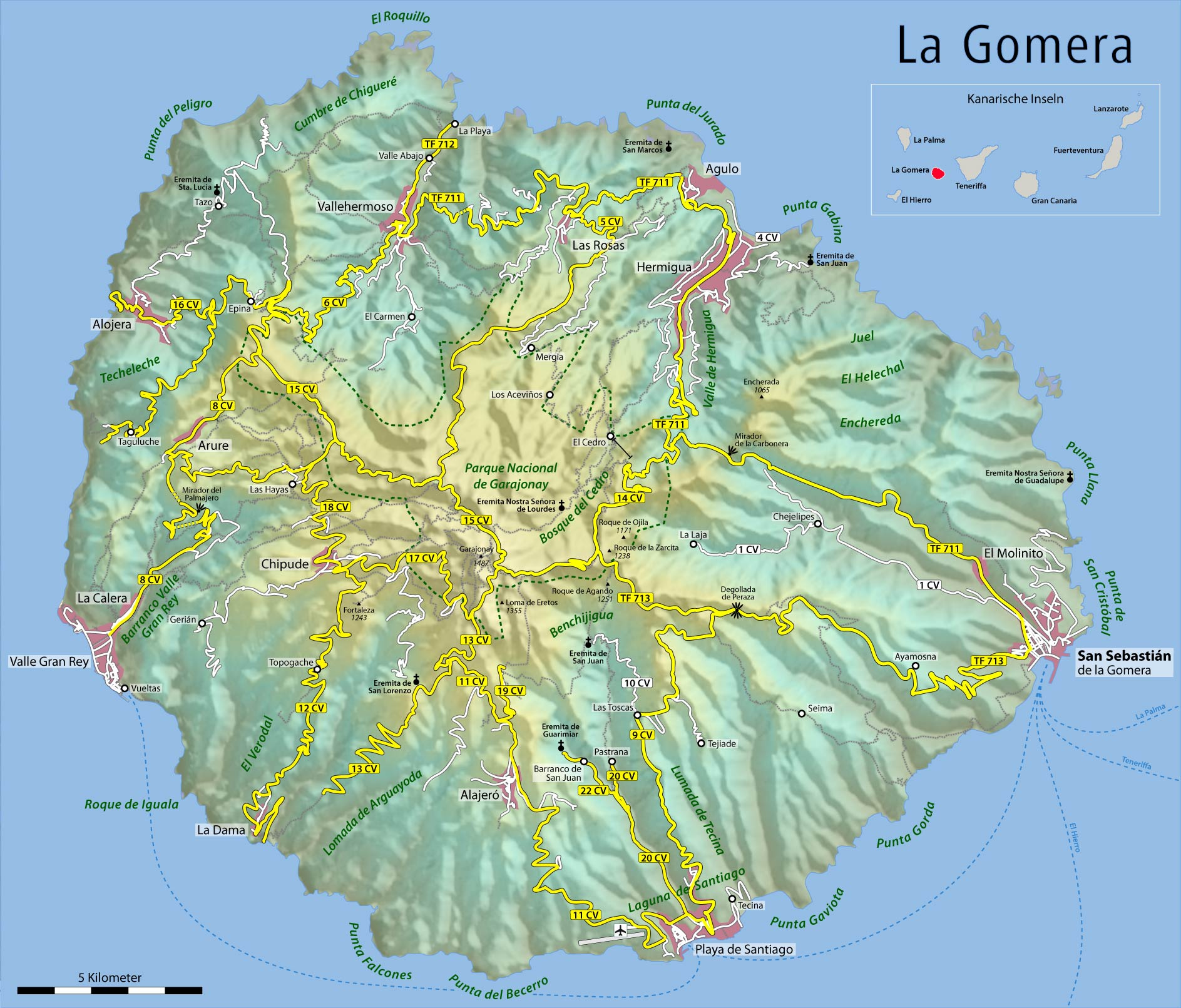
Map

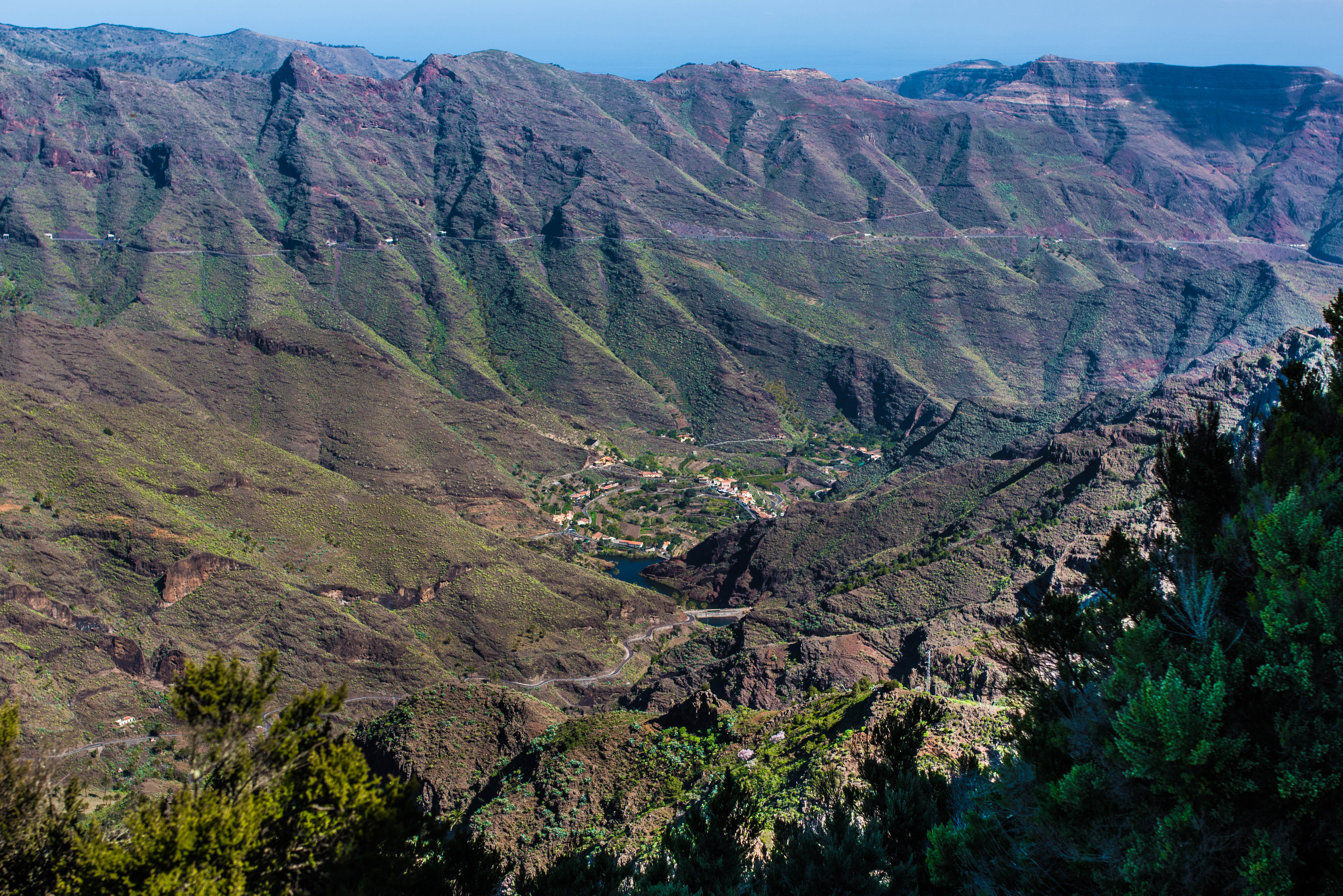
Volcanic valley of La Gomera

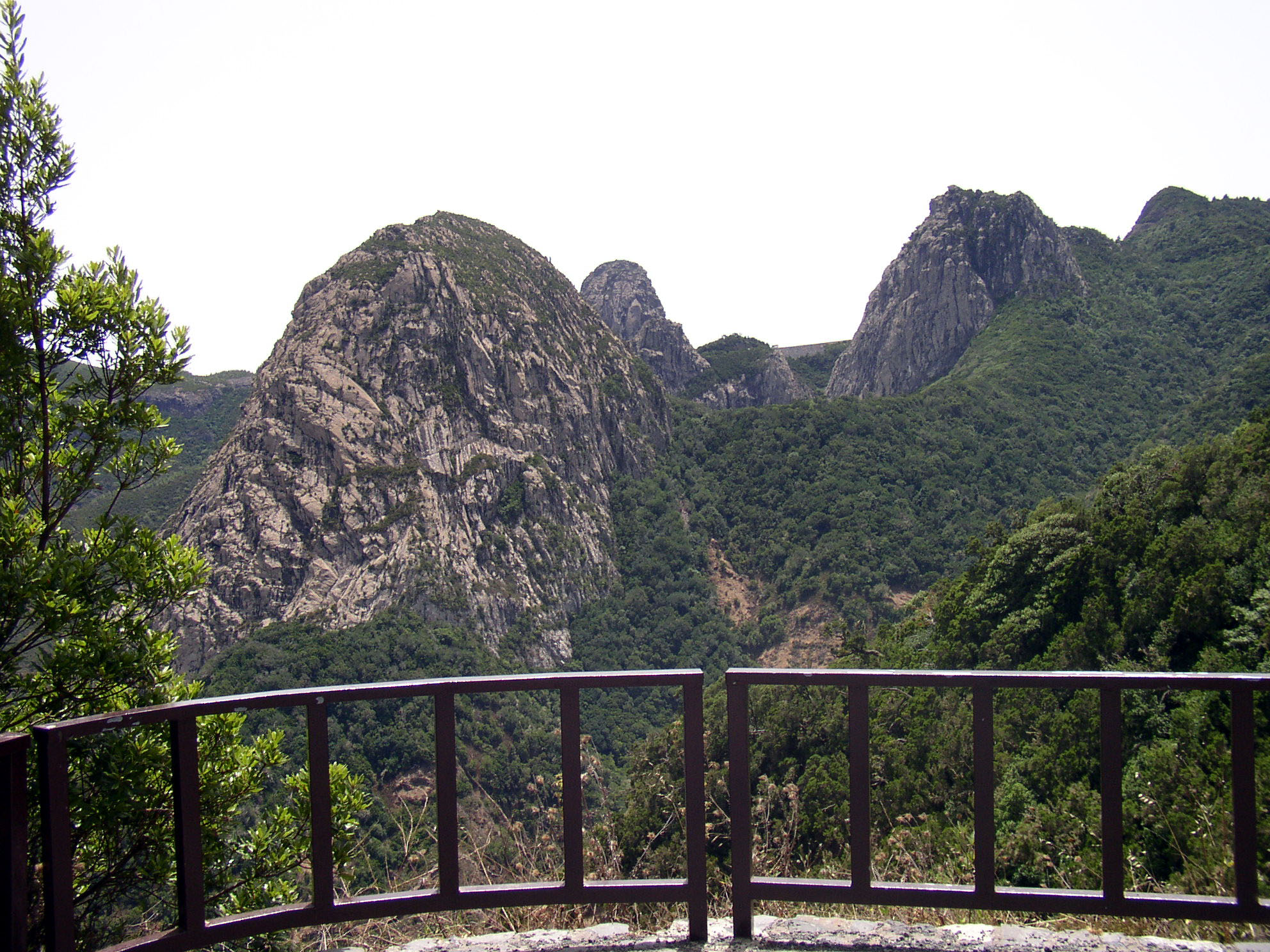
Volcanic plugs in the centre of La Gomera

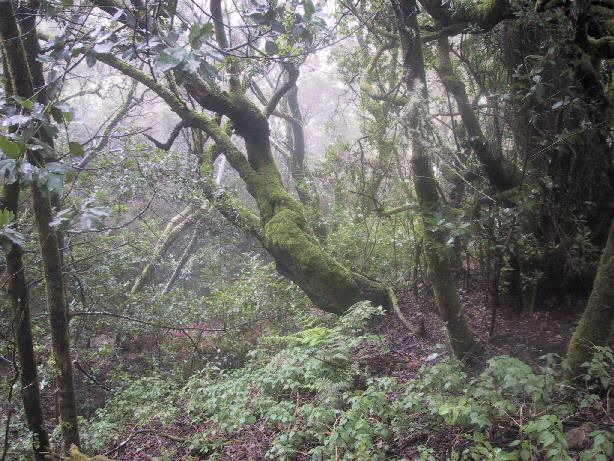
Laurisilva of Garajonay, in La Gomera

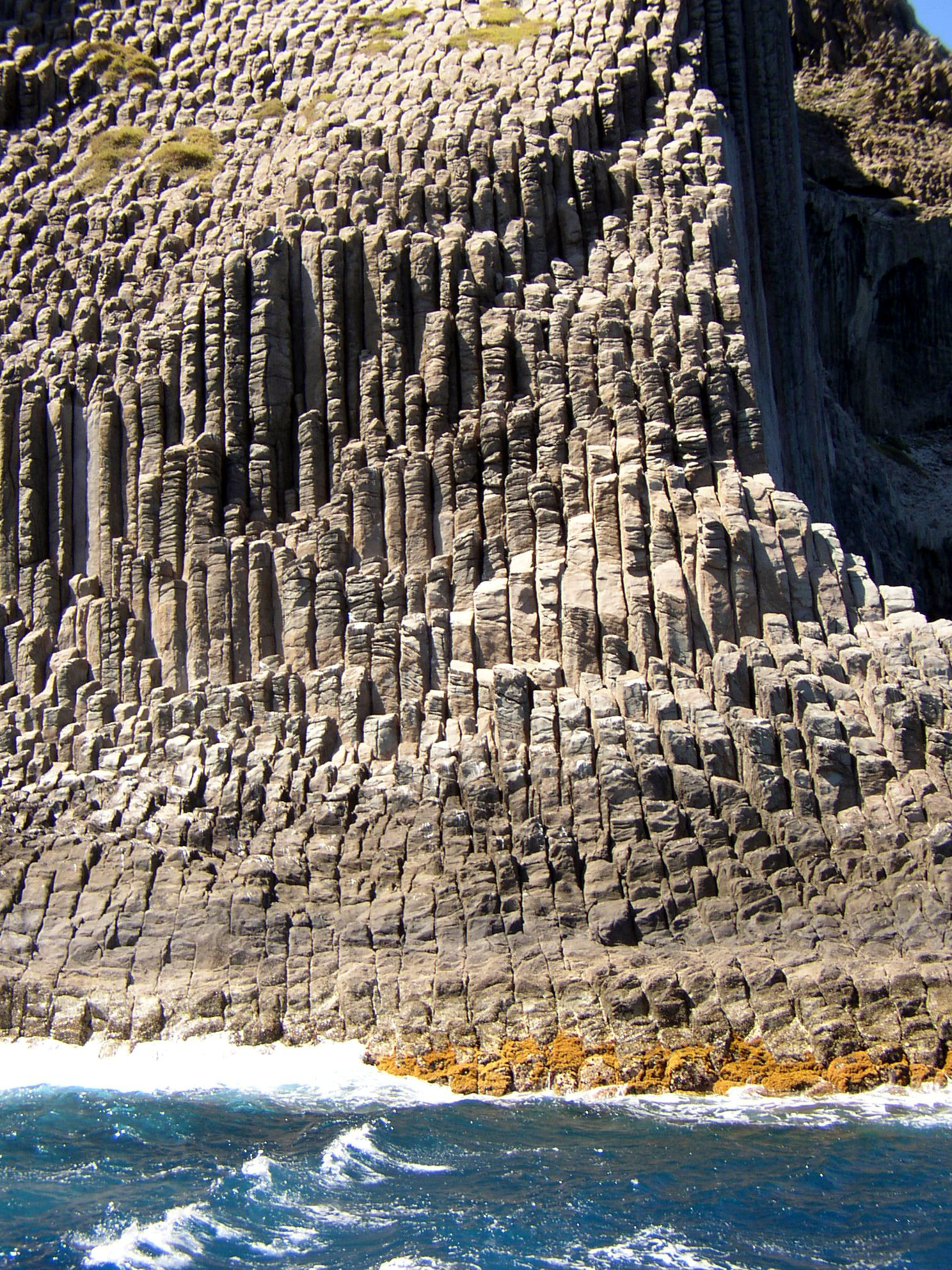
Los Órganos, La Gomera

La Gomera (Spanish: [la ɣoˈmeɾa]) is one of Spain's Canary Islands, in the Atlantic Ocean off the coast of Africa. With an area of 370.03 km^{2} (142.87 sq mi), it is the third-smallest of the archipelago's eight main islands. It belongs to the province of Santa Cruz de Tenerife. La Gomera is the third least populous of the eight main Canary Islands, with 22,361 inhabitants at the start of 2023. Its capital is San Sebastián de La Gomera, where the cabildo insular (island council) is located.

== Political organisation ==
La Gomera is part of the province of Santa Cruz de Tenerife. It is divided into six municipalities:

Name	Area (km^{2})	Census population			Estimated population (2023)
Name	Area (km^{2})	2001	2011	2021	Estimated population (2023)
Agulo	25.36	1,127	1,148	1,111	1,123
Alajeró	49.43	1,465	2,005	2,054	2,066
Hermigua	39.67	2,038	2,076	1,851	1,943
San Sebastián de la Gomera	113.59	6,618	8,943	9,313	9,584
Valle Gran Rey	32.36	4,239	4,547	4,632	4,705
Vallehermoso	109.32	2,798	2,961	2,932	2,940
Totals	370.03	18,285	21,680	21,893	22,361

The island government (cabildo insular) is in the capital, San Sebastián.

== Geography ==
The island is of volcanic origin and roughly circular; it is about 22 km (14 mi) in diameter. It is very mountainous and steeply sloping and rises to 1,487 m (4,879 ft) at its highest peak, Alto de Garajonay. Its shape is rather like an orange that has been cut in half and then split into segments, which has left deep ravines or barrancos between them.

=== Climate ===
The lower altitudes of La Gomera fall into the desert climate zone, while the higher mountainous areas fall into the Mediterranean climate zone.

Climate data for La Gomera Airport WMO ID: 60007; Climate ID: C329B; coordinates 28°01′54″N 17°12′39″W; elevation: 219 m (719 ft); 1991–2020 normals, extremes 2000–present
Month	Jan	Feb	Mar	Apr	May	Jun	Jul	Aug	Sep	Oct	Nov	Dec	Year
Record high °C (°F)	27.8 (82.0)	29.1 (84.4)	35.9 (96.6)	36.5 (97.7)	39.3 (102.7)	37.8 (100.0)	42.2 (108.0)	42.8 (109.0)	40.1 (104.2)	36.3 (97.3)	32.6 (90.7)	28.0 (82.4)	42.8 (109.0)
Mean maximum °C (°F)	24.0 (75.2)	24.3 (75.7)	26.7 (80.1)	26.7 (80.1)	28.1 (82.6)	30.0 (86.0)	34.4 (93.9)	34.0 (93.2)	31.4 (88.5)	31.0 (87.8)	27.7 (81.9)	24.4 (75.9)	38.0 (100.4)
Mean daily maximum °C (°F)	20.6 (69.1)	20.6 (69.1)	21.4 (70.5)	22.0 (71.6)	23.1 (73.6)	24.5 (76.1)	26.4 (79.5)	27.3 (81.1)	26.7 (80.1)	25.8 (78.4)	23.6 (74.5)	21.5 (70.7)	23.6 (74.5)
Daily mean °C (°F)	17.7 (63.9)	17.5 (63.5)	18.1 (64.6)	18.7 (65.7)	19.8 (67.6)	21.2 (70.2)	23.0 (73.4)	23.9 (75.0)	23.6 (74.5)	22.8 (73.0)	20.7 (69.3)	18.8 (65.8)	20.5 (68.9)
Mean daily minimum °C (°F)	14.7 (58.5)	14.4 (57.9)	14.7 (58.5)	15.4 (59.7)	16.4 (61.5)	17.9 (64.2)	19.5 (67.1)	20.5 (68.9)	20.4 (68.7)	19.7 (67.5)	17.8 (64.0)	16.0 (60.8)	17.3 (63.1)
Mean minimum °C (°F)	12.3 (54.1)	12.2 (54.0)	12.1 (53.8)	13.3 (55.9)	14.3 (57.7)	16.1 (61.0)	17.8 (64.0)	18.6 (65.5)	18.7 (65.7)	17.0 (62.6)	15.1 (59.2)	13.8 (56.8)	11.5 (52.7)
Record low °C (°F)	10.6 (51.1)	10.0 (50.0)	9.8 (49.6)	10.7 (51.3)	12.5 (54.5)	14.4 (57.9)	16.3 (61.3)	16.7 (62.1)	17.3 (63.1)	14.4 (57.9)	13.6 (56.5)	12.2 (54.0)	9.8 (49.6)
Average precipitation mm (inches)	21.1 (0.83)	31.6 (1.24)	16.5 (0.65)	6.5 (0.26)	1.8 (0.07)	0.2 (0.01)	0.0 (0.0)	1.4 (0.06)	3.9 (0.15)	29.5 (1.16)	25.7 (1.01)	42.7 (1.68)	180.7 (7.11)
Average precipitation days (≥ 1.0 mm)	2.4	3.4	2.4	1.3	0.4	0.1	0.0	0.3	0.6	2.8	2.3	3.8	19.9
Average relative humidity (%)	62	63	64	65	66	69	70	71	73	69	66	65	67
Percentage possible sunshine	68	68	71	73	76	77	81	80	72	68	65	63	72
Source: State Meteorological Agency/AEMET OpenData

== Ecology ==
The uppermost slopes of these barrancos, in turn, are covered by the laurisilva – or laurel rain forest, where up to 50 inches of precipitation fall each year.

The upper reaches of this densely wooded region are almost permanently shrouded in clouds and mist, and as a result are covered in lush and diverse vegetation. This area forms the protected environment of Spain's Garajonay National Park, which was declared a UNESCO World Heritage Site in 1986. The slopes are criss-crossed by trails of varying difficulty, offering views of the surrounding area.

The central mountains trap the moisture from the trade wind clouds and yield a temperate cloud forest climate, which contrasts with the warmer, sun-baked cliffs near sea level.

Between these extremes is a variety of microclimates. For centuries, La Gomera's inhabitants have farmed the lower levels by channelling runoff water to irrigate their vineyards, orchards and banana groves.

== Natural symbols ==
The official natural symbols associated with La Gomera are Columba junoniae (paloma rabiche) and Persea indica (viñátigo).

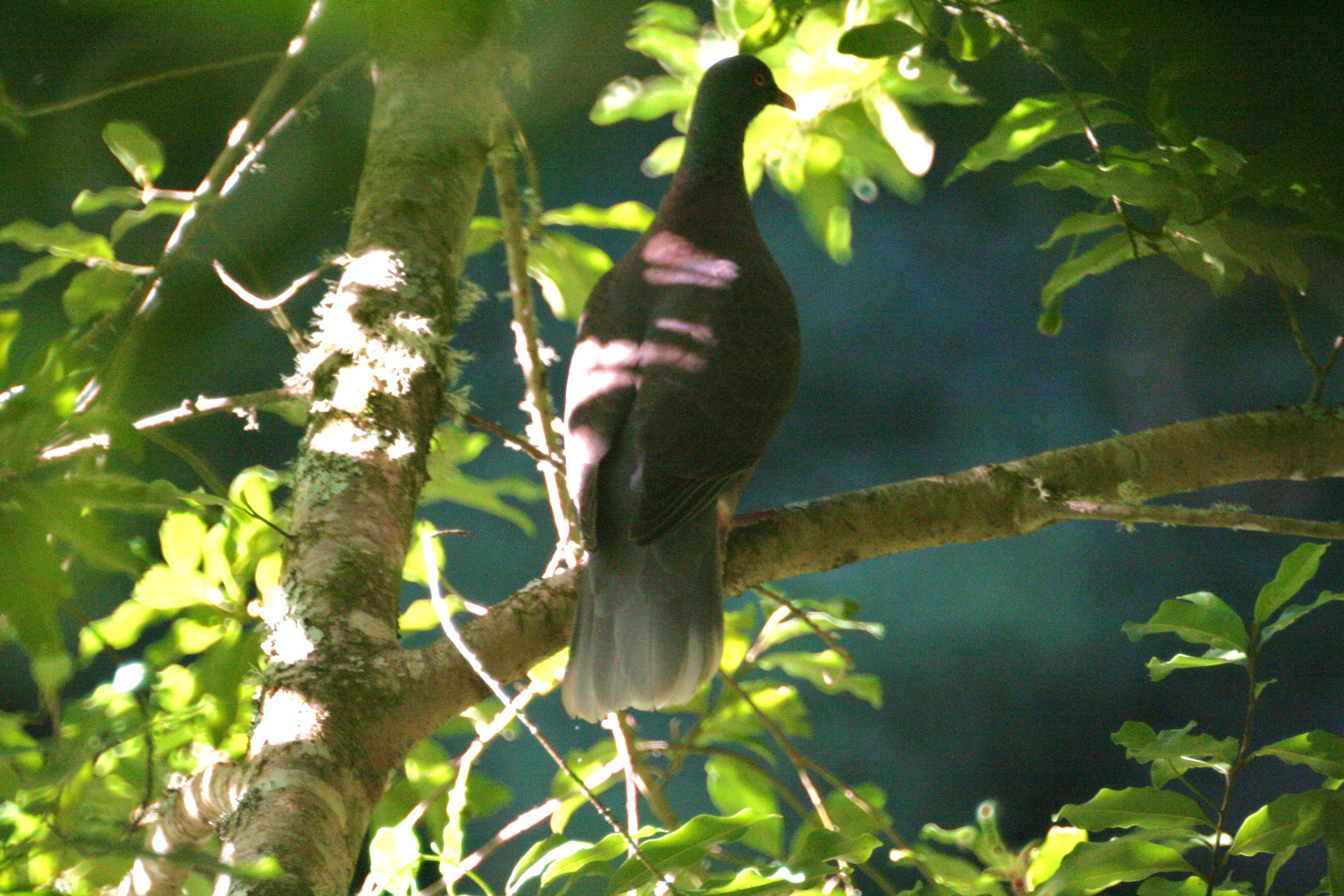
Columba junoniae

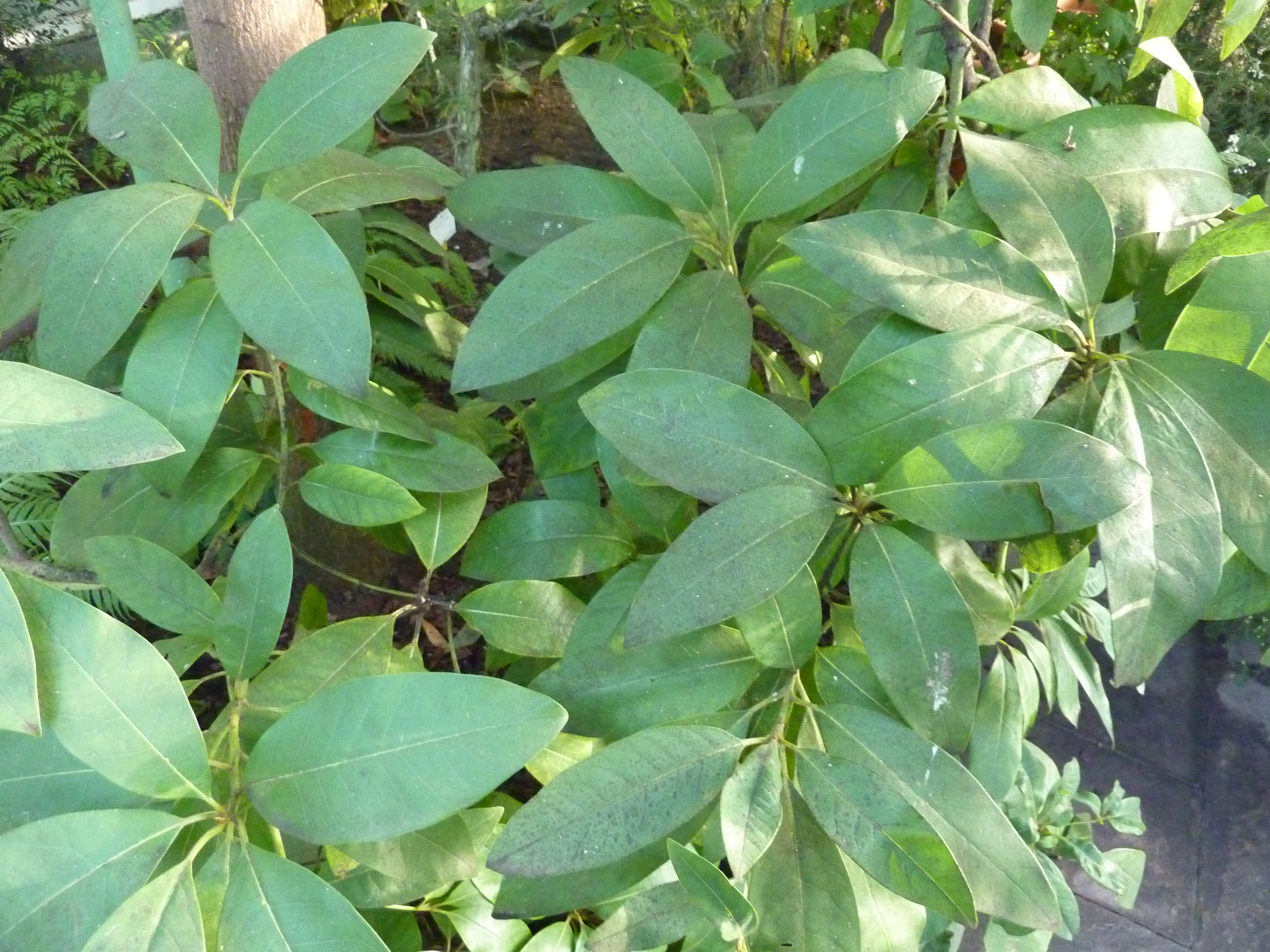
Persea indica

== Culture ==
The local wine is distinctive and often accompanied with a tapa (snack) of local cheese, roasted pork, or goat meat. Other culinary specialities include almogrote, a cheese spread, miel de palma, a syrup extracted from palm trees, and "escaldón", a porridge made with gofio flour.

La Gomera's inhabitants have an ancient way of communicating across deep ravines by means of a whistled speech called Silbo Gomero, which can be heard two miles away. This whistled language is indigenous to the island, and its existence has been documented since Roman times. Invented by the original inhabitants of the island, the Guanches, Silbo Gomero was adopted by the Spanish settlers in the 16th century and survived after the Guanches were entirely assimilated. When it was threatened with extinction at the dawn of the 21st century, the local government required all children to learn it in school. Marcial Morera, a linguist at the University of La Laguna, has said that the study of silbo may help understand how languages are formed.

In the mountains of La Gomera, its original inhabitants worshipped their god, whom they called Orahan. The summit and centre of the island served as their sanctuary. Many natives took refuge in this sacred territory in 1489 as they faced imminent defeat at the hands of the Spaniards, and it was there that the conquest of La Gomera ended. Archaeologists have found ceremonial stone constructions there that appear to represent sacrificial altar stones, slate hollows, or cavities. It was there that the Guanches built pyres upon which to make offerings of goats and sheep to Orahan, who was known on La Palma as Abora and on Tenerife and Gran Canaria as Arocan. The Guanches also interred their dead in caves. Today, saints, who are worshipped through village festivals, are principally connected with Christianity. But in some aspects, the Guanches' godlike idealising of Gomeran uniqueness plays a role as well besides their pre-Christian and pre-colonial implication and shows strong local differences.

Christopher Columbus made La Gomera his last port of call before crossing the Atlantic in 1492 with his three ships, stopping to replenish his crew's food and water supplies, intending to stay only four days. Beatriz de Bobadilla y Ossorio, the Countess of La Gomera and widow of Hernán Peraza the Younger, offered him vital support in preparations of the fleet, and he ended up staying one month. When he finally set sail on 6 September 1492, she gave him cuttings of sugarcane, which became the first to reach the New World. After his first voyage of Discovery, Columbus again provisioned his ships at the port of San Sebastián de La Gomera in 1493 on his second voyage to the New World, commanding a fleet of 17 vessels. He visited La Gomera for the last time in 1498 on his third voyage to the Americas. The house in San Sebastián in which he is reputed to have stayed is now a tourist attraction.

== Festivals ==
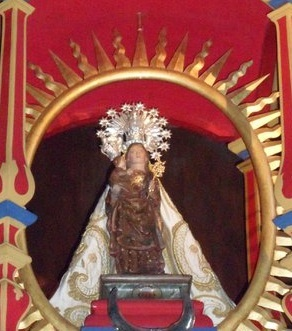
Virgin of Guadalupe, patron saint of La Gomera.

The festival of the Virgin of Guadalupe, patron saint of the island, is the Monday following the first Saturday of October.

Every five years (most recently in 2023) is celebrated the Bajada de la Virgen de Guadalupe (the Bringing the Virgin) from her hermitage in Puntallana to the capital. She is brought by boat to the beach of San Sebastián de La Gomera, where several people host her, and transported throughout the island for two months.

== Notable natives and residents ==
- Antonio José Ruiz de Padrón (1757–1823), Franciscan priest and politician. (Native)
- José Aguiar (1895–1975), painter. (Native)
- Pedro García Cabrera (1905–1981), writer and poet. (Native)
- Tim Hart (1948–2009), English folk musician.(Resident)
- Manuel Mora Morales (born 1952), writer, filmmaker and editor. (Native)
- Oliver Weber (born 1970), German photographer, physician and professor of visual arts. (Resident)

== See also ==
- Geology of the Canary Islands
