= Guancha (disambiguation) =

Guancha is a Chinese news site founded by Eric X. Li.

Guancha or La Guancha may also refer to:

- Clathrina, a genus of sponges also known as Guancha
- La Guancha, Tenerife, a municipality in Tenerife, Canary Islands
- Complejo Recreativo y Cultural La Guancha, a recreational complex in Ponce, Puerto Rico
- Paseo Tablado La Guancha, a sea-front boardwalk in Ponce, Puerto Rico
