= Valle Gran Rey =

- Municipality
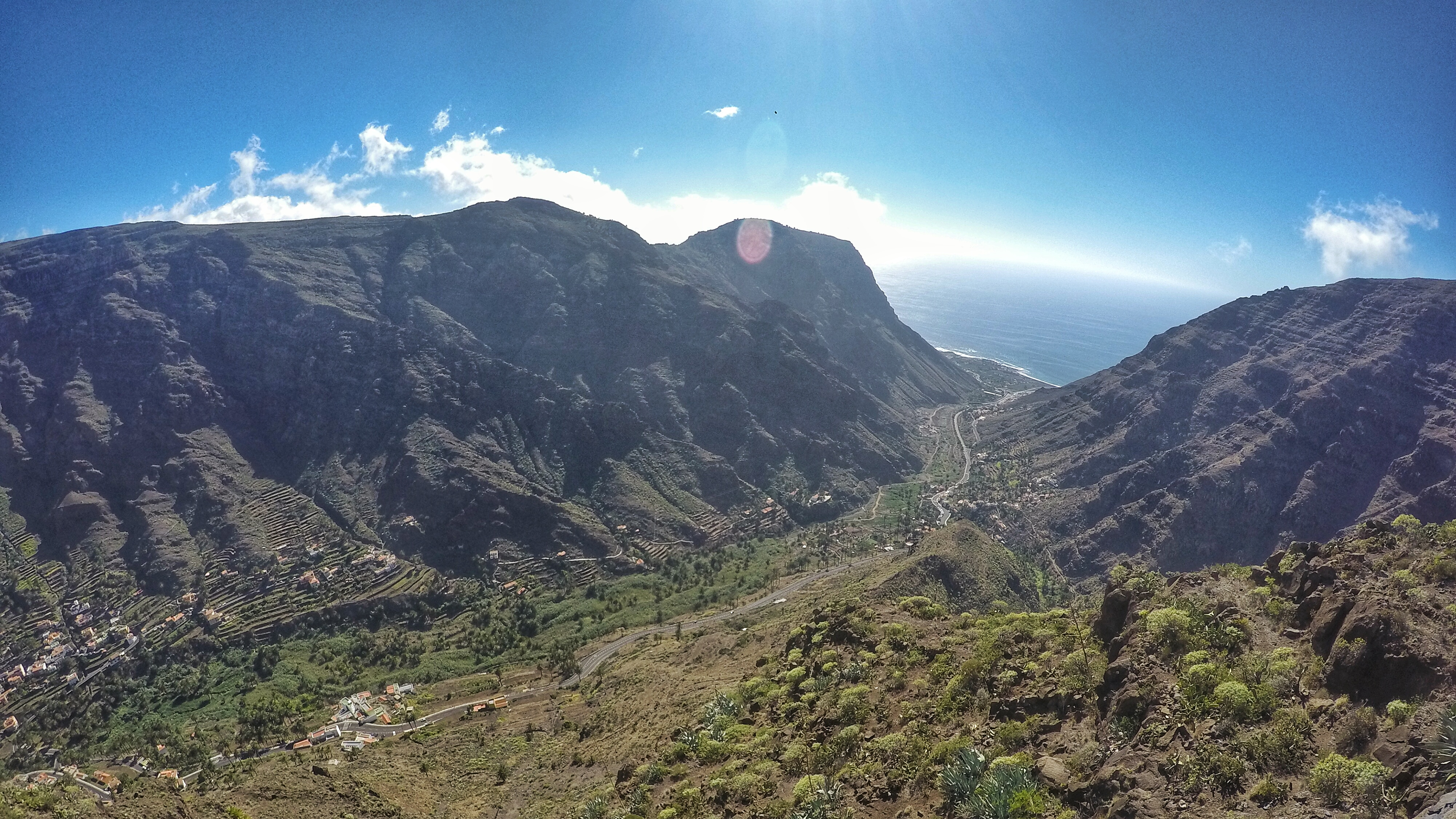
- Valle Gran Rey

- Flag Coat of arms

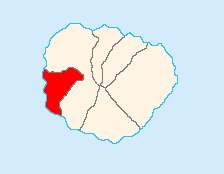
- Municipal location in La Gomera

- Location in Canary Islands
- Coordinates: 28°6′N 17°20′W
- Country: Spain
- Autonomous Region: Canary Islands
- Province: Santa Cruz de Tenerife
- Island: La Gomera

Government
  - Mayor: Angel Piñero Cruz

Area
  - Total: 32.36 km^{2} (12.49 sq mi)

Population (2025-01-01)
  - Total: 4,830
  - Density: 149/km^{2} (387/sq mi)
- Time zone: UTC+0 (GMT)
- Website: www.vallegranrey.es

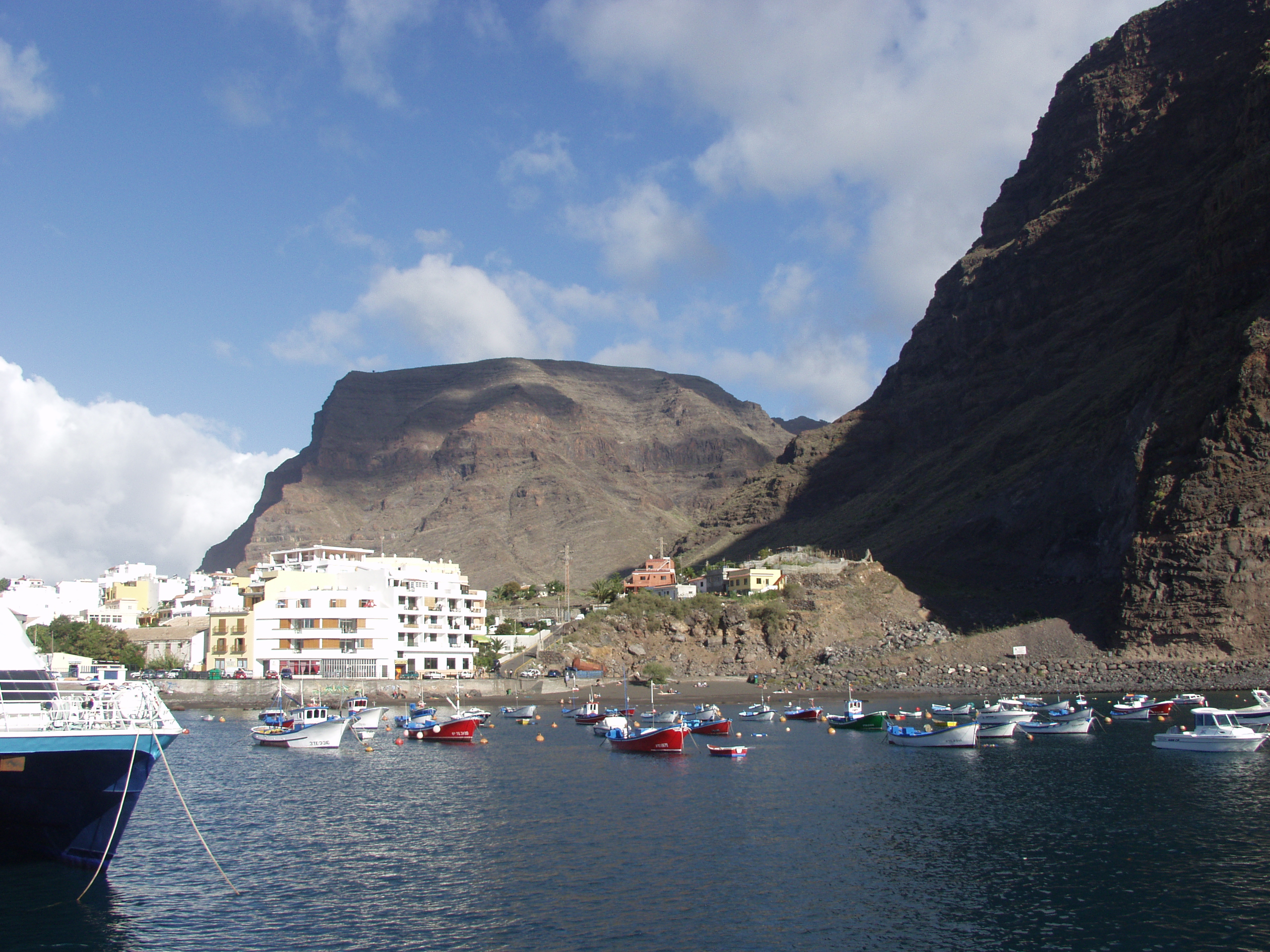
Vueltas harbour

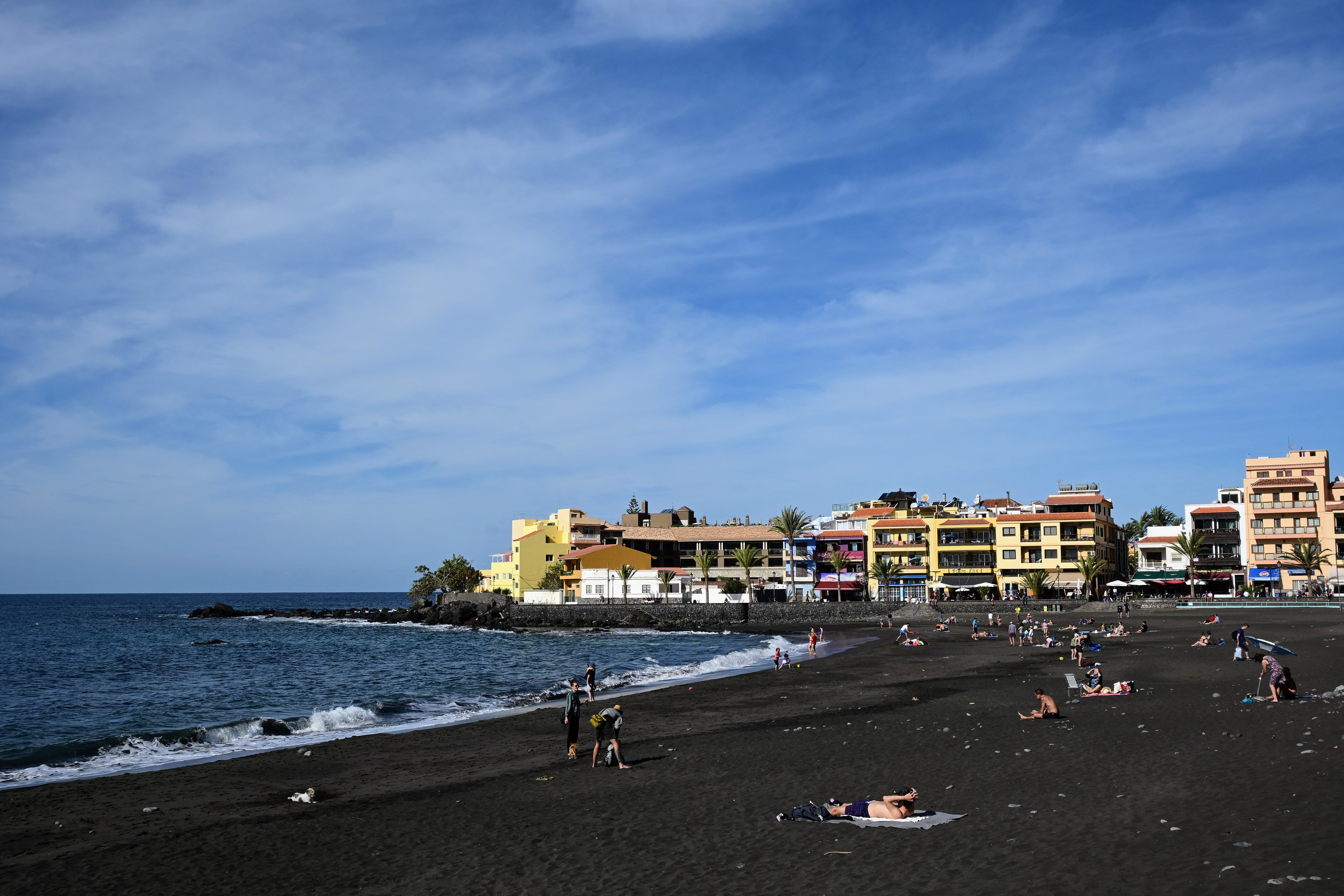
The beach of La Calera

Valle Gran Rey is a municipality in the western part of the island La Gomera, in the province of Santa Cruz de Tenerife of the Canary Islands, Spain. The Guanche name of the area was Orone. The seat of the municipality since 1930 is La Calera; previously it was in Arure.

The population was 4,240 in 2013, and the area is 32.36 square kilometres (12.49 sq mi). Valle Gran Rey borders the municipality of Vallehermoso to the east, while the Atlantic Ocean lies to the west.

== Geography and climate ==
It is located in the west of the island, bordering the municipality of Vallehermoso. It has an extension of 32.36 km^{2} (12½ sq. mi.). The altitude of the municipal capital is about 50 meters (200') above sea level, reaching a maximum altitude of 1,225 meters (4020') above sea level at the central summit of the island.

Valle Gran Rey has a hot-summer Mediterranean climate (Köppen: Csb; Trewartha: Csal), depending on the altitude and location of the nearest weather station in Arure, the precipitation is three to four times higher than in coastal areas due to its location on the windward slope.

Climate data for Valle Gran Rey (Arure) Climate ID: C316I; coordinates 28°07′42″N 17°18′54″W; elevation: 916 m (3,005 ft); 2018–2024 normals, extremes 2018–present
Month	Jan	Feb	Mar	Apr	May	Jun	Jul	Aug	Sep	Oct	Nov	Dec	Year
Record high °C (°F)	24.5 (76.1)	26.4 (79.5)	30.9 (87.6)	32.4 (90.3)	34.8 (94.6)	36.8 (98.2)	40.0 (104.0)	42.1 (107.8)	36.2 (97.2)	36.5 (97.7)	29.3 (84.7)	24.9 (76.8)	42.1 (107.8)
Mean daily maximum °C (°F)	15.5 (59.9)	17.1 (62.8)	17.0 (62.6)	18.3 (64.9)	20.5 (68.9)	22.1 (71.8)	27.5 (81.5)	28.9 (84.0)	25.0 (77.0)	23.1 (73.6)	19.3 (66.7)	17.4 (63.3)	21.0 (69.8)
Daily mean °C (°F)	12.5 (54.5)	13.6 (56.5)	13.6 (56.5)	14.3 (57.7)	16.2 (61.2)	17.8 (64.0)	22.2 (72.0)	23.8 (74.8)	20.6 (69.1)	19.3 (66.7)	16.0 (60.8)	14.3 (57.7)	17.0 (62.6)
Mean daily minimum °C (°F)	9.4 (48.9)	10.1 (50.2)	10.1 (50.2)	10.3 (50.5)	11.8 (53.2)	13.5 (56.3)	17.0 (62.6)	18.8 (65.8)	16.1 (61.0)	15.4 (59.7)	12.7 (54.9)	11.2 (52.2)	13.0 (55.4)
Record low °C (°F)	5.4 (41.7)	4.7 (40.5)	5.7 (42.3)	7.3 (45.1)	8.0 (46.4)	9.9 (49.8)	11.8 (53.2)	12.6 (54.7)	12.4 (54.3)	9.9 (49.8)	8.2 (46.8)	7.8 (46.0)	4.7 (40.5)
Average precipitation mm (inches)	58.6 (2.31)	53.4 (2.10)	50.0 (1.97)	26.0 (1.02)	6.6 (0.26)	12.9 (0.51)	1.0 (0.04)	3.7 (0.15)	17.1 (0.67)	28.4 (1.12)	55.8 (2.20)	57.5 (2.26)	370.8 (14.60)
Average precipitation days (≥ 0.1 mm)	12.00	9.80	12.00	6.40	3.60	4.60	2.20	1.60	4.33	9.33	11.17	11.50	88.53
Average relative humidity (%)	71	63	74	75	68	71	49	45	66	68	73	71	66
Source: State Meteorological Agency/AEMET OpenData

== Subdivisions ==
- Arure
- La Calera (seat)
- Casa de la Seda
- El Guro
- Las Hayas
- El Hornillo
- Taguluche
- La Playa
- Vueltas

== Historical population ==
Year	Population
1991	3,103
1996	3,631
2001	4,238
2002	4,248
2003	4,487
2004	4,745
2005	4,857
2013	4,240

== Notable natives and residents ==
- Tim Hart (died 2009), English folk musician
- Oliver Weber, German photographer, physician and professor of visual arts

== See also ==
- List of municipalities in Santa Cruz de Tenerife
