= Province of Santa Cruz de Tenerife =

Province of Spain

Coordinates: 28°10′N 17°20′W

Province of Santa Cruz de Tenerife Provincia de Santa Cruz de Tenerife (Spanish)
- Province
- Flag Coat of arms

- Map of Spain with Tenerife highlighted
- Country: Spain
- Autonomous community: Canary Islands
- Capital: Santa Cruz de Tenerife
- Municipalities: 54

Area
  - Total: 3,375.88 km^{2} (1,303.43 sq mi)
  - Rank: 47th in Spain
- Elevation (Teide): 3,718 m (12,198 ft)

Population (2025)
  - Total: 1,087,319
  - Rank: 13th in Spain
  - Density: 322.085/km^{2} (834.195/sq mi)
- Time zone: UTC+1 (CET)
  - Summer (DST): UTC+2 (CEST)
- Official language(s): Spanish
- Parliament: Cortes Generales

The Province of Santa Cruz de Tenerife within the Canary Islands

Map of the municipalities of the province of Santa Cruz de Tenerife

Province of Santa Cruz de Tenerife, also Province of Santa Cruz (Spanish: Provincia de Santa Cruz de Tenerife), is a province of Spain, consisting of the western part of the autonomous community of the Canary Islands. It consists of about half of the Atlantic archipelago: the islands of Tenerife, La Gomera, El Hierro, and La Palma. It also includes a series of adjacent roques (those of Salmor, Fasnia, Bonanza, Garachico and Anaga).

Its capital is the city of Santa Cruz de Tenerife (commonly known as Santa Cruz), on the island of Tenerife, which is also the capital city of the Canary Islands. As of 2025, the province has a population of 1,087,319 in an area of 3,375.88 square kilometres (1,303.43 sq mi) across its 54 municipalities, resulting in a population density of 322.1/km^{2}, making it the province of Spain with the 6th-highest population density, higher than that of the province of Las Palmas (the eastern half of the Canary Islands). 19.5% live in the capital, Tenerife is the most populated island of the Canary Islands and most populous island of Spain. In addition, the island also has the highest mountain of Spain and all of the Atlantic Islands, Teide 3,718 metres (12,198 ft).

Earlier issued vehicle license plates in this province bear the first two letters "TF" (named after Tenerife). Nowadays the plates share the same numbering system as in mainland Spain.

== History ==
This province was established in 1927, when the Canarias province (with Santa Cruz de Tenerife as the capital city) was divided into two provinces: Las Palmas and the province of Santa Cruz de Tenerife. In 1982, both provinces became part of the newly founded autonomous community of the Canary Islands.

== Municipalities ==
The province has 54 municipalities:

- Adeje
- Agulo
- Alajeró
- Arafo
- Arico
- Arona
- Barlovento
- Breña Alta
- Breña Baja
- Buenavista del Norte
- Candelaria
- El Paso
- El Pinar
- El Rosario
- El Sauzal
- El Tanque
- Fasnia
- Frontera
- Fuencaliente de la Palma
- Garachico
- Garafía
- Granadilla de Abona
- Guía de Isora
- Güímar
- Hermigua
- Icod de los Vinos
- La Guancha
- La Matanza de Acentejo
- La Orotava
- La Victoria de Acentejo
- Los Llanos de Aridane
- Los Realejos
- Los Silos
- Puerto de la Cruz
- Puntagorda
- Puntallana
- San Andrés y Sauces
- San Cristóbal de La Laguna
- San Juan de la Rambla
- San Miguel de Abona
- San Sebastián de la Gomera
- Santa Cruz de la Palma
- Santa Cruz de Tenerife
- Santa Úrsula
- Santiago del Teide
- Tacoronte
- Tazacorte
- Tegueste
- Tijarafe
- Valle Gran Rey
- Vallehermoso
- Valverde
- Vilaflor de Chasna
- Villa de Mazo

== Demographics ==
As of 2025, the population is 1,087,319, of which 49.0% are males, and 51.0% are females. Minors make up 14.2% of the population, and seniors make up 19.1%.

Historical population

Year	Pop.	±%
1842	133,059	—
1857	139,042	+4.5%
1877	164,638	+18.4%
1887	177,209	+7.6%
1900	206,356	+16.4%
1910	260,707	+26.3%
1920	273,400	+4.9%
1930	317,566	+16.2%
1940	365,605	+15.1%

Year	Pop.	±%
1950	427,796	+17.0%
1960	506,744	+18.5%
1970	576,458	+13.8%
1981	658,884	+14.3%
1991	725,815	+10.2%
2001	806,801	+11.2%
2011	995,429	+23.4%
2021	1,047,565	+5.2%

Source: INE

=== Immigration ===
As of 2025, immigrants make up 25.5% of the population. The 5 largest foreign countries of birth are Venezuela, Cuba, Italy, Colombia, and Germany.

=== Largest cities ===
Largest municipalities in the Canary Islands INE – 2025
Rank	Name	Island	Pop.	Rank	Name	Island	Pop.
1	Santa Cruz de Tenerife	Tenerife	211,498	11	Icod de los Vinos	Tenerife	24,675
2	San Cristóbal de La Laguna	Tenerife	161,927	12	San Miguel de Abona	Tenerife	24,307
3	Arona	Tenerife	89,036	13	Guía de Isora	Tenerife	22,846
4	Granadilla de Abona	Tenerife	59,126	14	Güímar	Tenerife	22,010
5	Adeje	Tenerife	50,612	15	Los Llanos de Aridane	La Palma	20,662
6	La Orotava	Tenerife	42,669	16	El Rosario	Tenerife	18,028
7	Los Realejos	Tenerife	38,161	17	Santa Cruz de la Palma	La Palma	15,763
8	Puerto de la Cruz	Tenerife	31,589	18	Santa Úrsula	Tenerife	15,450
9	Candelaria	Tenerife	29,240	19	Santiago del Teide	Tenerife	12,656
10	Tacoronte	Tenerife	24,694	20	Tegueste	Tenerife	11,513

City of Santa Cruz de Tenerife, capital of the province with the same name

== Sights (Tenerife) ==
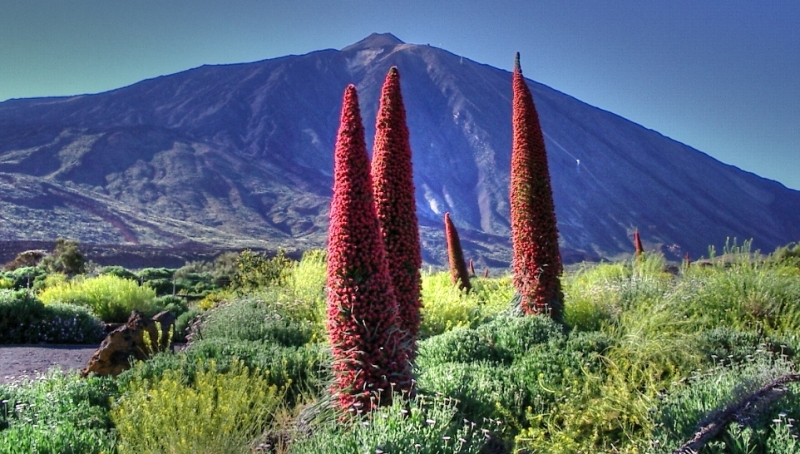
Mount Teide

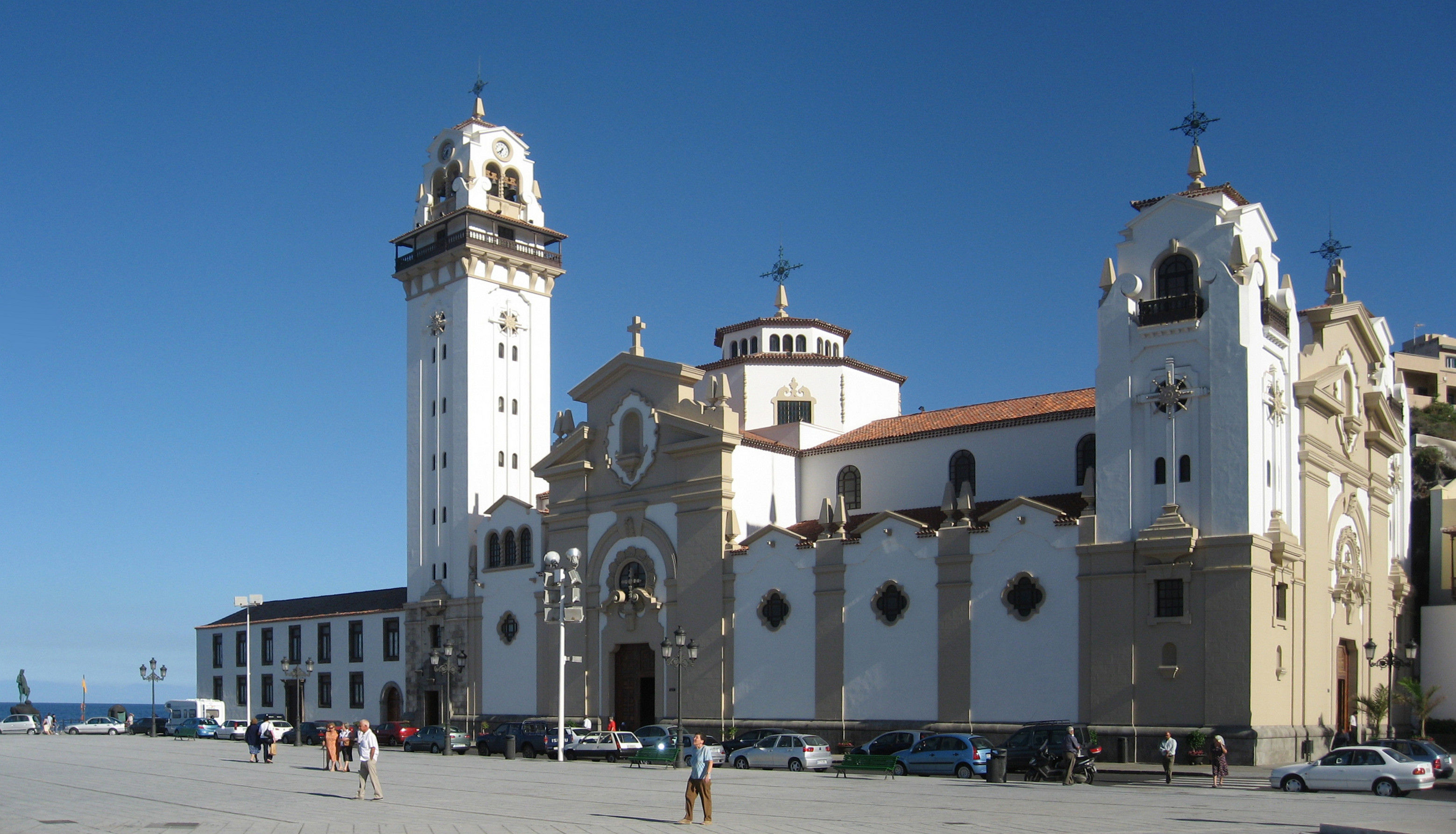
Basilica of Our Lady of Candelaria

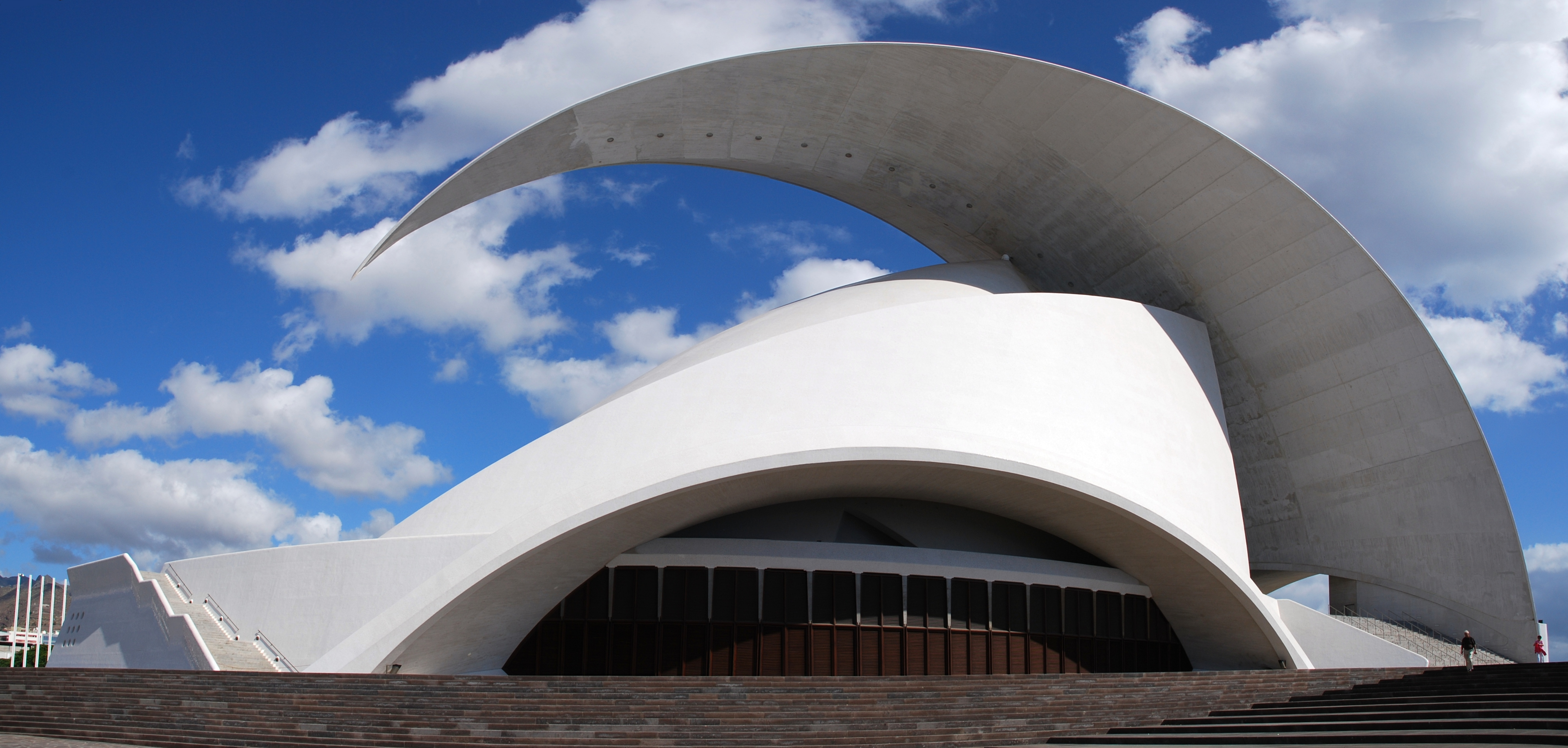
Auditorio de Tenerife

- Mount Teide: is a volcano on Tenerife in the Canary Islands. Its 3,718-metre (12,198-foot)-high summit is the highest point in Spain, the highest point above sea level in the islands of the Atlantic, and it is the third highest volcano in the world measured from its base on the ocean floor, after Mauna Loa and Mauna Kea located in Hawaii. The volcano and its surroundings comprise the Teide National Park, is also one of the most visited National Parks in the world, with a total of 2.8 million visitors, according to the Instituto Canario de Estadística (ISTAC). The park has an area of 18,900 hectares (73 sq mi) and was named a World Heritage Site by UNESCO on 29 June 2007.
- Auditorio de Tenerife: Was designed by architect Santiago Calatrava Valls, construction began in 1997 and was completed in 2003. The auditorium was inaugurated on 26 September of that year with the presence of Felipe de Borbón, Prince of Asturias, and was later visited by former U.S. President Bill Clinton. The building is framed within the tenets of late-modern architecture of the late 20th century. The majestic profile of the auditorium has become an architectural symbol of the city of Santa Cruz de Tenerife. It is also regarded as the finest modern building in the Canary Islands and one of the most emblematic buildings of Spanish architecture.
- The Basilica of Our Lady of Candelaria (in Candelaria): The place where the image of the Virgin of Candelaria (saint patron of the Canary Islands) can be found, this sanctuary is built in neoclassical style, and is visited daily by the parishioners, who visit the Villa Mariana out of devotion to the Virgin. Is the first Marian shrine of the Canary Islands, the principal catholic center of peregrination of the Canary Islands and one of the principal ones of Spain, the basilica hosts more than 2,5 million visitors annually.
- San Cristóbal de La Laguna: The third-most populous city of the archipelago and second-most populous city of the island. Its economy is business-oriented while agriculture dominates the northeastern portion of the city. The urban area dominates the central and the southern parts. Tourism covers the northern coast. The main industry includes some manufacturing. La Laguna historical center was declared World Heritage Site by the UNESCO in 1999. In 2010 after a survey, La Laguna was listed as the city with the best reputation in the Canary Islands and the third no provincial capital city of Spain with the best reputation, but behind Gijón and Marbella.
- Museo de la Naturaleza y el Hombre: Is a museum based in Santa Cruz de Tenerife, it contains many significant archaeological finds and is considered the best repository of objects from the Prehispanic Canary Islands. The museum also houses significant paleontological, botanical, entomological and marine and terrestrial vertebrate collections, in an excellent state of preservation, and is considered the best Natural Library of the Canary Islands. The museum also integrates the Archaeological Museum of Tenerife, the Bioantropología's Canary Institute and the Museum of Natural Sciences of Tenerife. The museum is located in the downtown area of Santa Cruz, in the former Civil Hospital, a building that constitutes an example of the Neoclassical architecture of Canary Islands. The archaeological section was founded in 1958. The museum holds the largest collection on the culture of the Guanche and also has one of the most modern methods of presentation of mummies, (announced in 2006 by the Cabildo de Tenerife through a communique). It is also an internationally renowned museum and has participated in international meetings on archeology, but its fame is mainly due to its formidable collection of Guanche mummies.
- Los Cristianos: Is a town situated on the south coast of Tenerife. Located in the municipality of Arona between the cone of the mountain Chayofita and the greater mountain Guaza. The town centre is around the Los Cristianos bay, but is rapidly expanding inland with modern development. The town is a popular tourist resort and includes a ferry port.
- The Cathedral of San Cristóbal de La Laguna: Is a Catholic cathedral in Tenerife, Spain. Begun in 1904 and completed in 1915, it is dedicated to the Virgin of Los Remedios. This is one of the most important temples of the Canary Islands. Located in the city of San Cristóbal de La Laguna.
- Puerto de la Cruz: Is a city and municipality located on the north coast of Tenerife, in the Orotava Valley. Prior to the development of hotels and buildings, much of the area consisted of agricultural land. Considerable fiscal pressure led to the land being developed and the population shifted from rural to urban and tourism. The population is mainly urban today.

=== National parks ===
This province contains three of Spain's national parks, more than any other province: the Caldera de Taburiente National Park on La Palma, the Garajonay National Park on La Gomera, and the Teide National Park on Tenerife, encompassing Teide, Spain's highest mountain and also an inactive volcano.

== Transport ==
=== Air ===
The province is served by these airports:

- Tenerife North Airport
- Tenerife South Airport
- La Palma Airport
- La Gomera Airport
- El Hierro Airport
