= Hermigua =

- Municipality
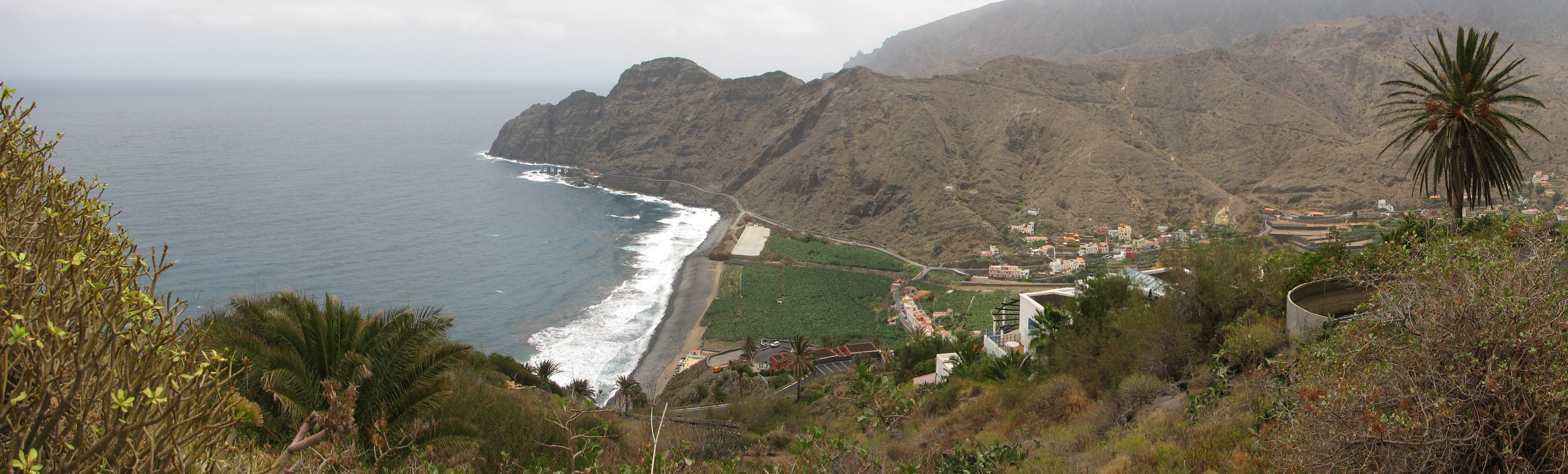
- Hermigua's coast

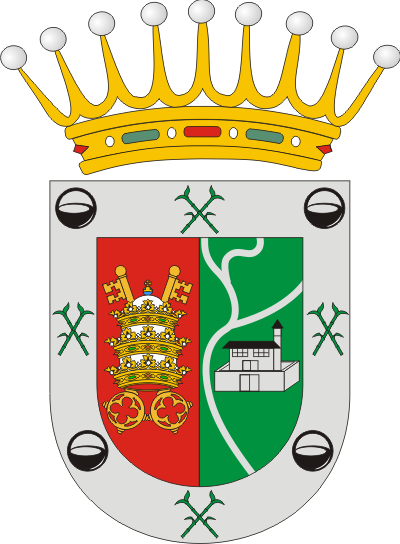
- Flag Coat of arms

- Location of Hermigua on La Gomera

- Location in the Canary Islands Hermigua (Spain, Canary Islands)
- Coordinates: 28°10′02″N 17°11′32″W
- Country: Spain
- Autonomous community: Canary Islands
- Province: Santa Cruz de Tenerife
- Island: La Gomera

Area
  - Total: 39.67 km^{2} (15.32 sq mi)
- Elevation: 210 m (690 ft)

Population (2025-01-01)
  - Total: 1,961
  - Density: 49.43/km^{2} (128.0/sq mi)

Hermigua is a town and a municipality in the northeastern part of La Gomera in the province of Santa Cruz de Tenerife of the Canary Islands, Spain. It is located 12 km northwest of the island's capital, San Sebastián de la Gomera. The Garajonay National Park covers the southern part of the municipality.

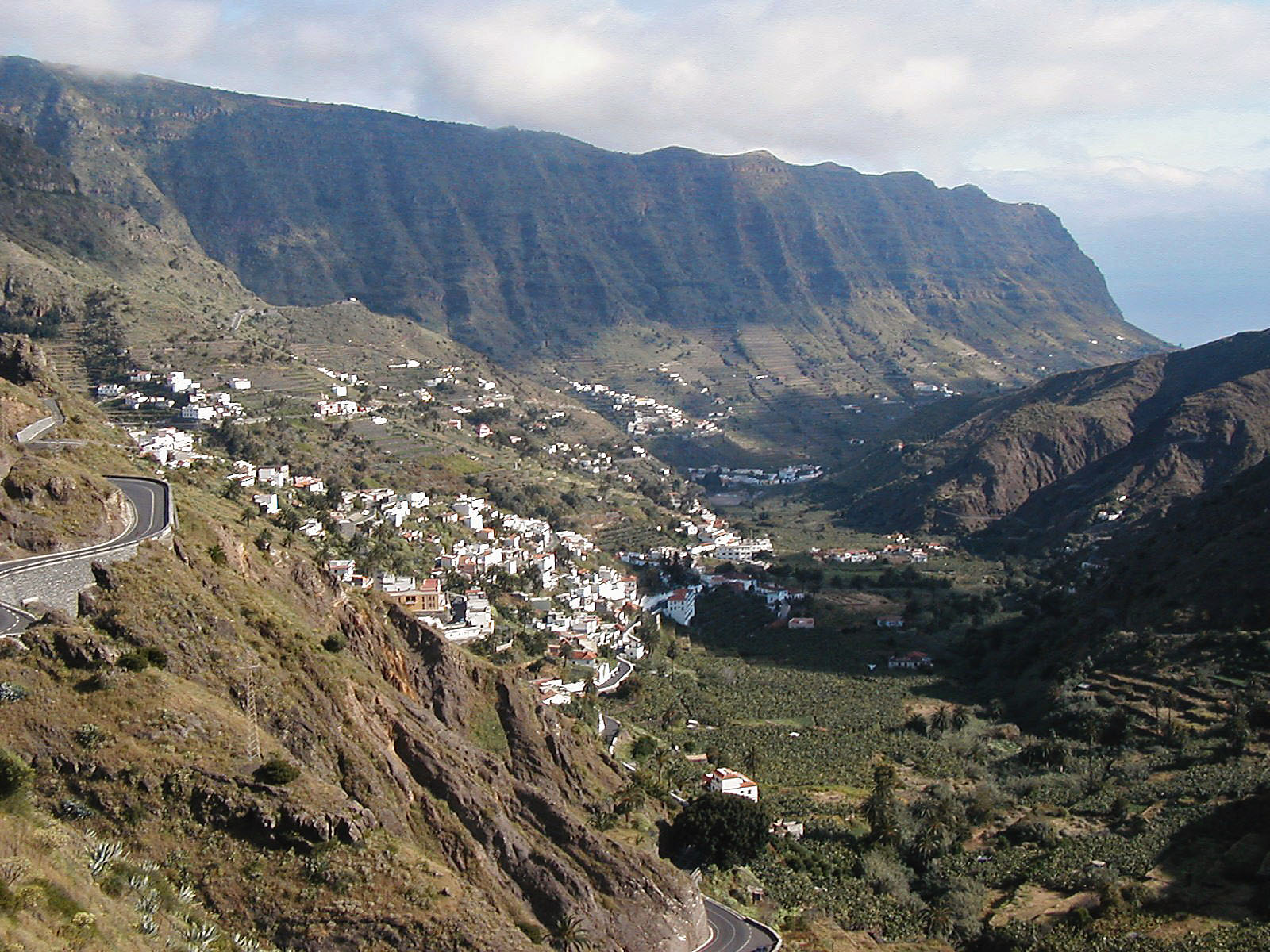
Landscape of Hermigua

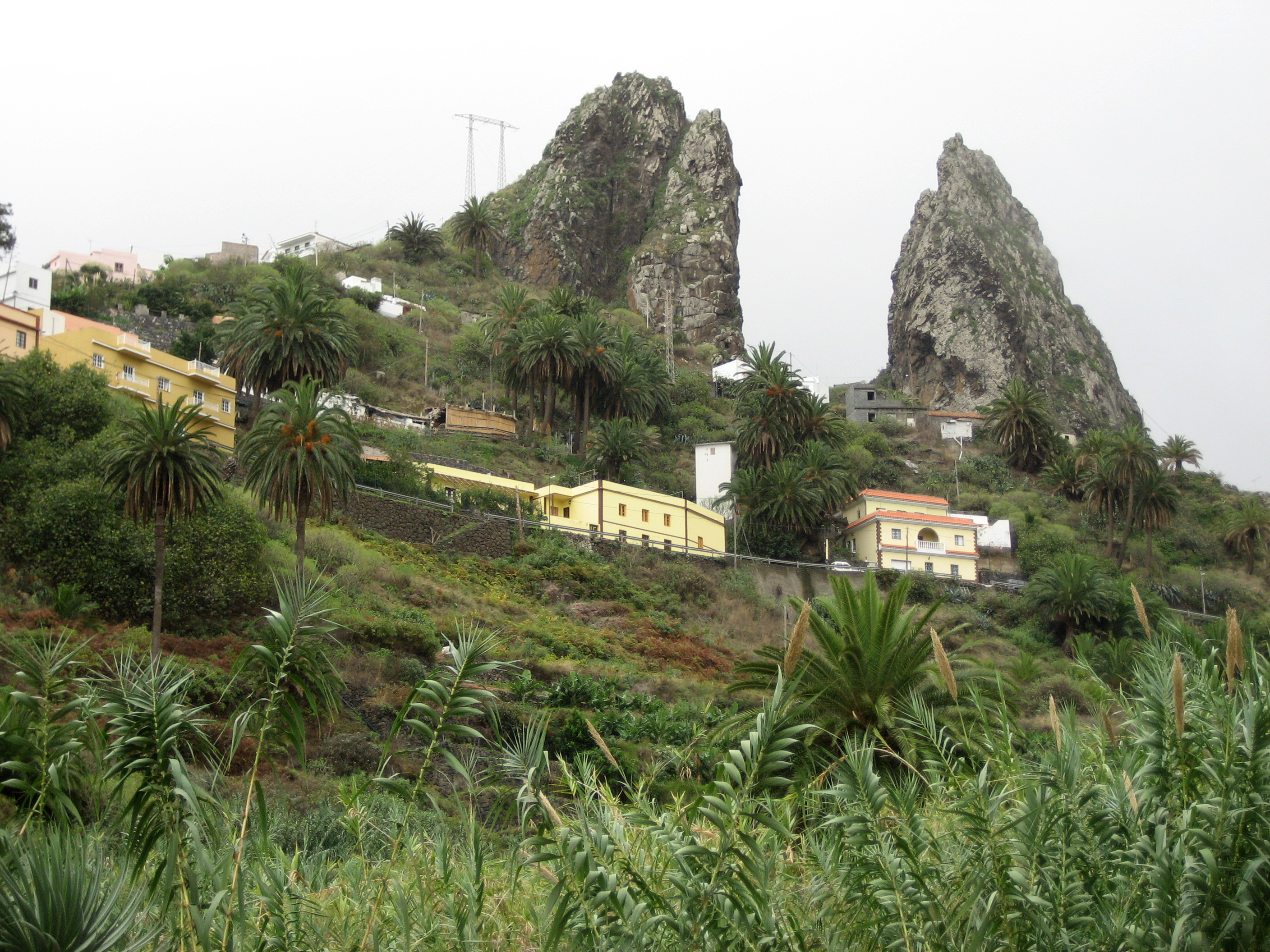
Roques de San Pedro

There are cedar forests in the area known as El Cedro. The valley was first inhabited by the Guanches and was known as Mulagua. The municipality of Hermigua was founded in the 16th century as the settlement of Valle Bajo.

== Settlements ==
- Valle Alto divides the settlements of El Curato and El Palmerejo
- Valle Bajo divides the settlements of La Castellana and Playa Hermigua
- El Cabo
- Monteforte
- El Estanquillo
- El Corralete
- La Cabezadas
- El Convento
- La Cerca
- Las Hoyetas
- Caserío del Cedro

== Historical population ==
| Year | Population |
|---|---|
| 1991 | 2,120 |
| 1996 | 2,150 |
| 2001 | 2,038 |
| 2002 | 2,151 |
| 2003 | 2,167 |
| 2004 | 2,176 |
| 2013 | 2,103 |

== Sites of interest ==
- Valle Alto, the first settlement in Hermigua: its neighbourhood "El Convento" features a Dominican church and monastery built 1611; another landmark is the Escuela popular
- El Chorro waterfall
- Los Telares Museum: contains handicrafts from the surrounding area
- "Museo Etnográfico de La Gomera" Ethnographic Museum of La Gomera
- "Roques Pedro y Petra"
- "El Curato"
- "El Pescante" (The Old Davit)
- "El Caserío del Cedro": a hamlet by the National Park in a small isolated valley
- "Playa de La Caleta" (La Caleta Beach)
- "Ermita de San Juan"
- "Ermita de San José"
- Mahona Natural Reserve

== See also ==
- List of municipalities in Santa Cruz de Tenerife
