= Vallehermoso, Santa Cruz de Tenerife =

Vallehermoso
- Municipality
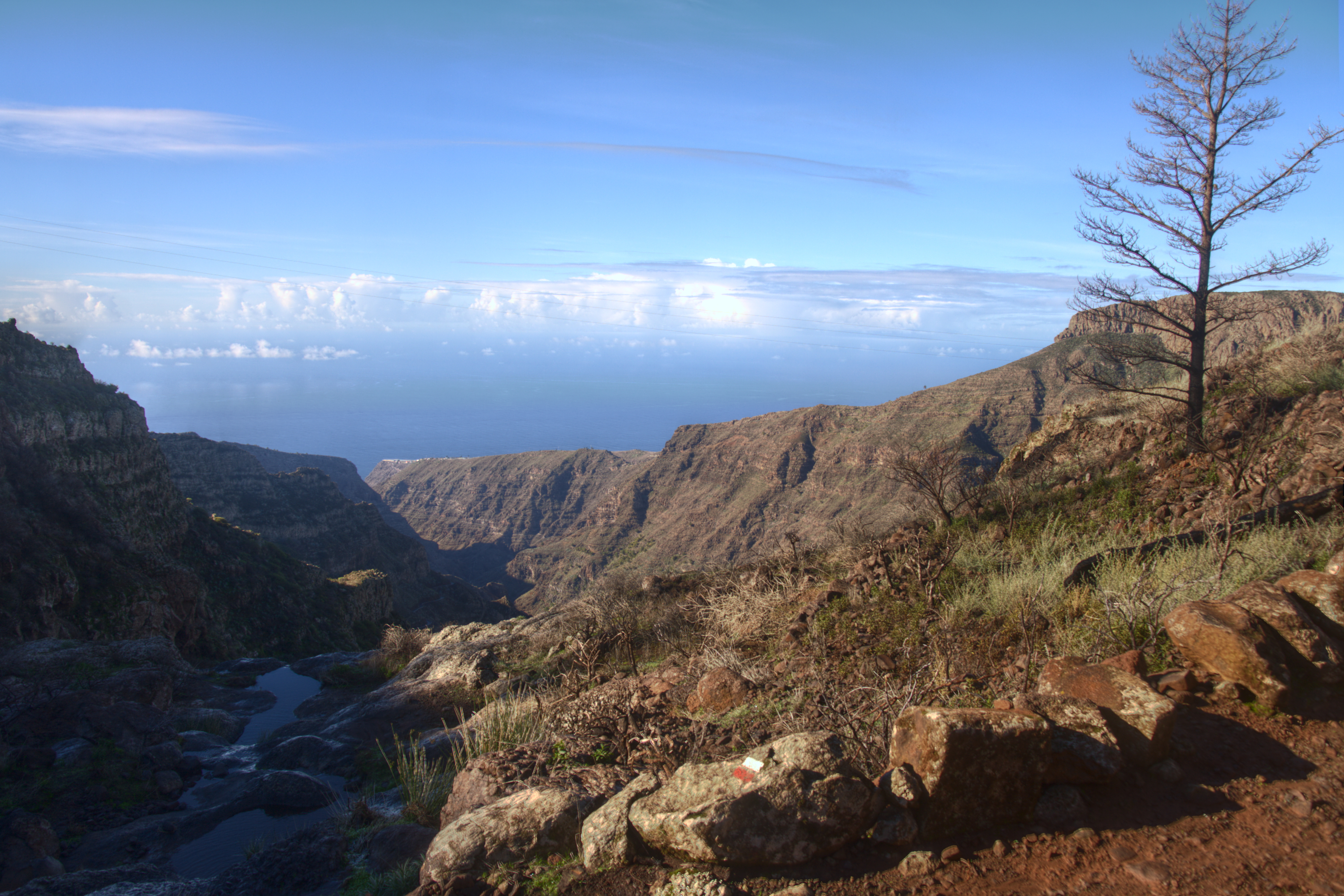
- Erque Canyon in Vallehermoso

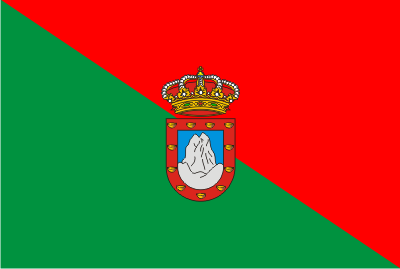
- Flag Coat of arms

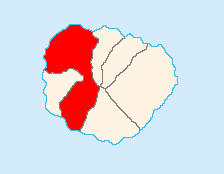
- Municipal location in La Gomera

- Location in Canary Islands
- Coordinates: 28°11′N 17°16′W
- Country: Spain
- Autonomous Region: Canary Islands
- Province: Santa Cruz de Tenerife
- Island: La Gomera

Area
  - Total: 109.32 km^{2} (42.21 sq mi)

Population (2025-01-01)
  - Total: 2,938
  - Density: 26.88/km^{2} (69.61/sq mi)
- Time zone: UTC+0 (GMT)

Vallehermoso is a village and municipality in the western part of the island La Gomera in the province of Santa Cruz de Tenerife of the Canary Islands, Spain. The town of Vallehermoso, the seat of the municipality, is situated in the northern part of the municipality, 3 km from the coast and 18 km northwest of the island capital, San Sebastián de la Gomera.

The population was 2,945 in 2013, and the area is 109.32 square kilometres (42.21 sq mi), making it the second largest municipality of the island. The elevation of the urban centre of the town is 230 metres (750 ft). Vallehermoso is known for its "miel de palma" (palm honey) as well as tomato, potato and banana production.

== Subdivisions ==
- Alojera
- Arguamul
- Banda de las Rosas
- Chipude
- El Cercado
- El Ingenio
- Epina
- Erque
- Erquito
- La Dama
- La Dehesa
- La Palmita
- La Quilla
- La Rajita
- Los Bellos
- Los Chapines
- Los Loros
- Macayo
- Pavón
- Rosas de las Piedras
- Tamargada
- Tazo
- Temocodá
- Valle Abajo

== Historical population ==
Year	Population
1991	2,876
1996	2,716
2001	2,798
2002	2,912
2003	3,109
2004	3,200
2005	3,141
2013	2,945

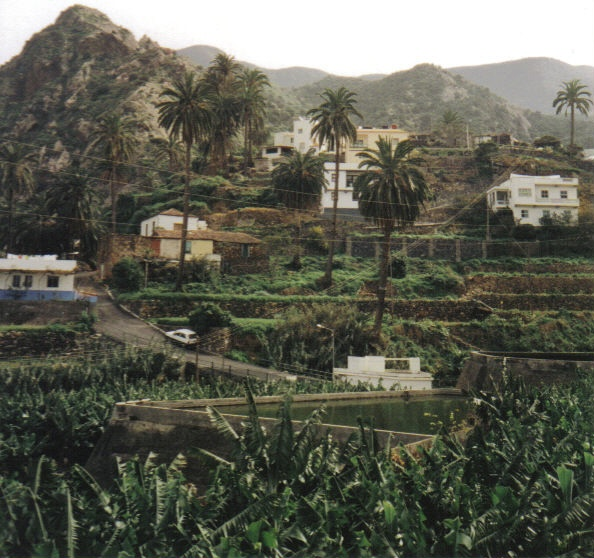
Landscape of Vallehermoso

== Sites of interest ==
The municipality features a rock-formed mountain Los Organos which are made up of basalt rocks. Mountaintops includes El Cercado and La Fortaleza or Chipude. The natural environment of the mountain area forms a part of the Garajonay Park. Directly by the coast of Vallehermoso features a cultural centre named El Castillo del Mar, located in an old banana factory which was used until 1950 is the centre for concerts, cinema and folklore music. The Castillo was restored in 1981 by the photographer Thomas K. Müller.

A botanical garden, Jardín Botánico del Descubrimiento de Vallehermoso, was constructed in 2000 under the direction of the Botanical Gardens in Las Palmas at a cost of 310 million pesetas. The garden covers an area of 16,219 square metres (174,580 sq ft) and contains plant species from five continents, especially species found by the explorers of the New World. Plants from all the Canary Islands archipelago are included, with a special focus on the endemic plants of La Gomera.

== See also ==
- List of municipalities in Santa Cruz de Tenerife
