= Puntagorda =

- Municipality
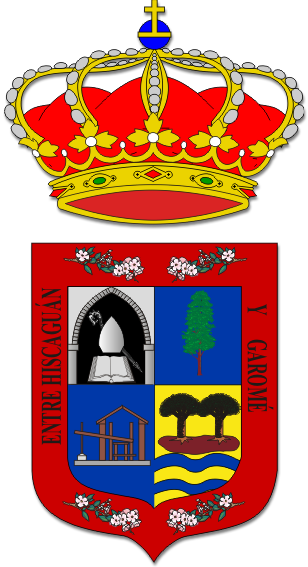
- Flag Coat of arms

- Location in Canary Islands
- Coordinates: 28°46′30″N 17°58′40″W
- Country: Spain
- Autonomous community: Canary Islands
- Province: Santa Cruz de Tenerife
- Island: La Palma

Area
  - Total: 31.10 km^{2} (12.01 sq mi)
- Elevation: 722 m (2,369 ft)

Population (2025-01-01)
  - Total: 2,345
  - Density: 75.40/km^{2} (195.3/sq mi)
- Website: www.puntagorda.es

Puntagorda is a village and a municipality in the northwestern part of the island of La Palma, Canary Islands, Spain. It is situated 23 km northwest of Santa Cruz de la Palma. The municipality consists of a number of small villages, total population 2,057 (2013). The area is 31.10 km^{2}. The elevation of the village is around 700 m. The elevation of the municipality ranges from sea level to over 2000 m.

Farmlands dominate the middle altitudes around the village, mainly smallholdings and orange and avocado orchards. Above the village are the vineyards producing the local Traviesa wine which won a Spanish national gold medal in 2004. Further up the slopes of the Caldera de Taburiente are forests of Canary Island pine. The steep cliffs of the coastline are a protected area of outstanding natural beauty. There is access to a small seawater pool via 460 steps. Puntagorda is well known for its almond trees which blossom in January and February. The festival of the flowering almonds is held every year at the end of January or beginning of February. There is a farmers market every weekend with fresh local produce in the Mercadillo.

== Historical population ==
| Year | Population |
|---|---|
| 1991 | 1,802 |
| 1996 | 1,798 |
| 2001 | 1,675 |
| 2002 | 1,823 |
| 2003 | 1,789 |
| 2004 | 1,708 |
| 2005 | 1,795 |
| 2006 | 1,962 |
| 2007 | 1,974 |
| 2008 | 1,955 |
| 2009 | 2,108 |
| 2013 | 2,057 |

== See also ==
- List of municipalities in Santa Cruz de Tenerife
