= San Juan de la Rambla, Santa Cruz de Tenerife =

San Juan de la Rambla
- Municipality
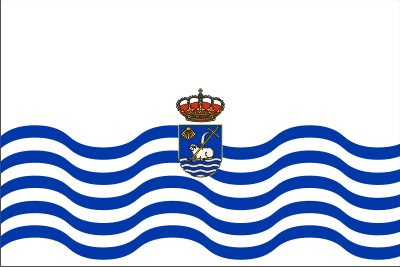
- Flag Coat of arms

- Municipal location in Tenerife

- Location in Tenerife San Juan de la Rambla (Canary Islands) San Juan de la Rambla (Spain, Canary Islands)
- Coordinates: 28°23′40″N 16°39′0″W
- Country: Spain
- Autonomous Region: Canary Islands
- Province: Santa Cruz de Tenerife
- Island: Tenerife

Area
  - Total: 20.67 km^{2} (7.98 sq mi)

Population (2025-01-01)
  - Total: 4,987
  - Density: 241.3/km^{2} (624.9/sq mi)
- Time zone: UTC+0 (GMT)
- Climate: Csa
- Website: www.ayuntamientoelrosario.org

San Juan de la Rambla is a town and a municipality in the northern part of the island of Tenerife, one of the Canary Islands, and part of the province of Santa Cruz de Tenerife, Spain. It is located on the north coast, 12 km west of La Orotava and 40 km west of the island's capital Santa Cruz de Tenerife. The population is 5,110 (2013) and the area is 20.67 km².

== Historical population ==
Year	Population
1991	4,507
1996	4,743
2001	4,782
2002	4,938
2003	5,027
2004	5,002
2013	5,110

== See also ==
- List of municipalities in Santa Cruz de Tenerife
