= El Tanque =

- Municipality
- Coat of arms

- Municipal location in Tenerife

- Location in Province of Santa Cruz de Tenerife El Tanque (Canary Islands) El Tanque (Spain, Canary Islands)
- Coordinates: 28°21′20″N 16°46′50″W
- Country: Spain
- Autonomous Region: Canary Islands
- Province: Santa Cruz de Tenerife
- Island: Tenerife

Area
  - Total: 23.65 km^{2} (9.13 sq mi)

Population (2025-01-01)
  - Total: 2,787
  - Density: 117.8/km^{2} (305.2/sq mi)
- Time zone: UTC+0 (GMT)
- Climate: Csb

El Tanque is a town and a municipality in the northwestern part of the island of Tenerife, one of the Canary Islands, and part of the province of Santa Cruz de Tenerife, Spain. It is located 6 km west of Icod de los Vinos and 53 km west of the island's capital Santa Cruz de Tenerife.

The population is 2,815 (2013) and the area is 23.65 km². The elevation is 480 m.

== Historical population ==
Year	Population
1991	3,058
1996	3,247
2001	2,966
2002	3,254
2003	3,198
2004	3,111
2013	2,815
