= Puntallana =

- Municipality
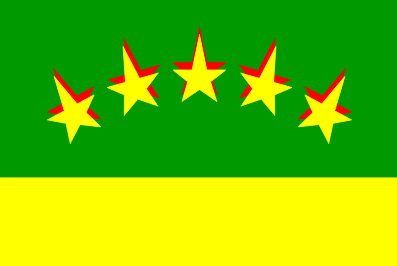
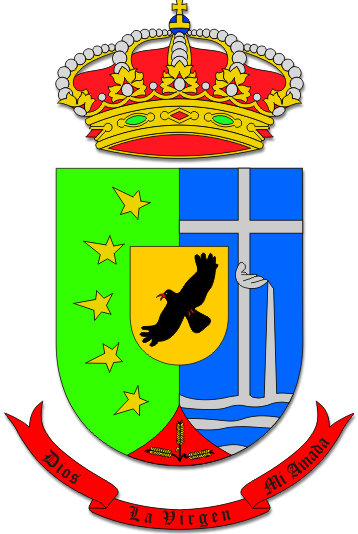
- Flag Coat of arms

- Location in Canary Islands
- Coordinates: 28°44′N 17°45′W
- Country: Spain
- Autonomous community: Canary Islands
- Province: Santa Cruz de Tenerife
- Island: La Palma

Area
  - Total: 35.10 km^{2} (13.55 sq mi)

Population (2025-01-01)
  - Total: 2,790
  - Density: 79.5/km^{2} (206/sq mi)

Puntallana is a town and a municipality on the island of La Palma, Province of Santa Cruz de Tenerife, Canary Islands, Spain. It is situated in the northeastern part of the island. The population of the municipality is 2,346 (2013) and the area is 35.10 km². The elevation is 420 m. Puntallana is 7 km northeast of the island capital Santa Cruz de La Palma.

== Historical population ==
Year	Population
1991	2,201
1996	2,249
2001	2,337
2002	2,308
2003	2,364
2004	2,380
2013	2,346

== See also ==
- List of municipalities in Santa Cruz de Tenerife
