= La Guancha, Tenerife =

Municipality in Canary Islands

La Guancha
- Municipality
- Flag Coat of arms

- Municipal location in Tenerife

- Location of the town in Tenerife La Guancha (Canary Islands) La Guancha (Spain, Canary Islands)
- Coordinates: 28°22′30″N 16°39′10″W
- Country: Spain
- Autonomous community: Canary Islands
- Province: Santa Cruz de Tenerife
- Island: Tenerife

Area
  - Total: 23.77 km^{2} (9.18 sq mi)
- Elevation: 500 m (1,600 ft)

Population (2025-01-01)
  - Total: 5,667
  - Density: 238.4/km^{2} (617.5/sq mi)
- Climate: Csb

La Guancha is a municipality in the northern part of the island of Tenerife, one of the Canary Islands, and part of the province of Santa Cruz de Tenerife. It is located about 40 km west of the island's capital Santa Cruz de Tenerife, and 6 km east of Icod de los Vinos. The population is 5,448 (2013) and the area is 23.77 km^{2}. The elevation is 501 m.

== Historical population ==
Year	Population
1991	5,205
1996	5,232
2001	5,193
2002	5,294
2003	5,318
2004	5,372
2013	5,448

== See also ==
- List of municipalities in Santa Cruz de Tenerife
