= San Sebastián de La Gomera =

- Municipality
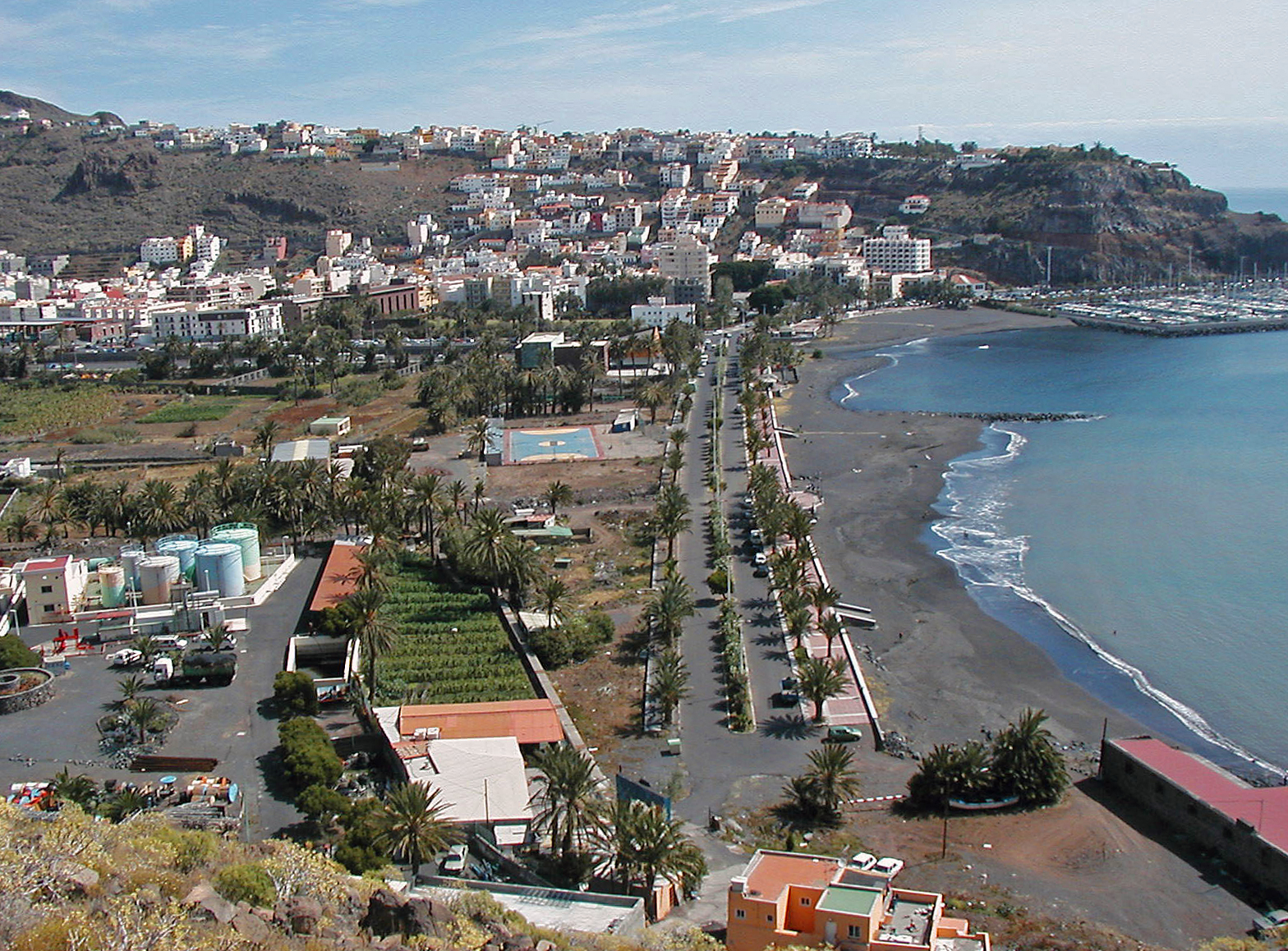
- San Sebastián de La Gomera

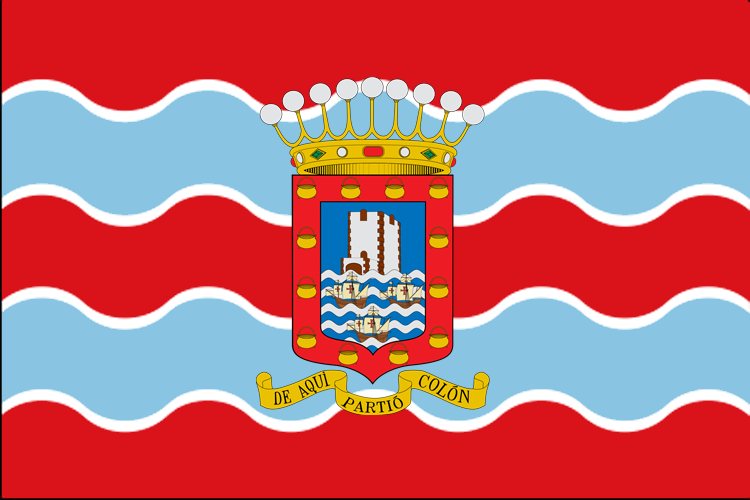
- Flag Coat of arms
- Location of Las San Sebastián de La Gomera
- Location within Canary Islands Location within Spain, Canary Islands
- Coordinates: 28°5′32″N 17°6′36″W
- Country: Spain
- Autonomous Community: Canary Islands
- Province: Santa Cruz de Tenerife
- Island: La Gomera

Government
  - Mayor: Adasat Reyes Herrera (Agrupación Socialista Gomera (ASG))

Area
  - Total: 113.59 km^{2} (43.86 sq mi)

Population (1 January 2023)
  - Total: 9,584
  - Density: 84.37/km^{2} (218.5/sq mi)
- Time zone: UTC+0 (CET)
  - Summer (DST): UTC+1 (CEST (GMT +1))
- Postal code: 38880
- Area code: +34 (Spain) + 922 (Tenerife)
- Website: Town Hall

San Sebastián de La Gomera is the capital and a municipality of La Gomera in the Canary Islands, Spain. It also hosts the main harbour. The population was 9,584 in 2023, and the area is 113.59 square kilometres (43.86 sq mi).

The port serves ferry routes to the islands of Tenerife, La Palma and El Hierro. Streets include Calle Real and F. Olsen. A bus station named Estación de Guaguas is used for bus lines throughout the island; it is located on Avenida Del Quinto Centenario.

== History ==
On 6 September, 1492, Christopher Columbus, having restocked his provisions and made repairs, departed from San Sebastián de La Gomera on his first expedition to what he thought were the Indies not knowing that the Americas were what he eventually discovered.

== List of notable people ==
- Ignacio Lorenzo de Armas (born 1706), settler and mayor of San Antonio, Texas in 1738 and 1764.

== Gallery ==
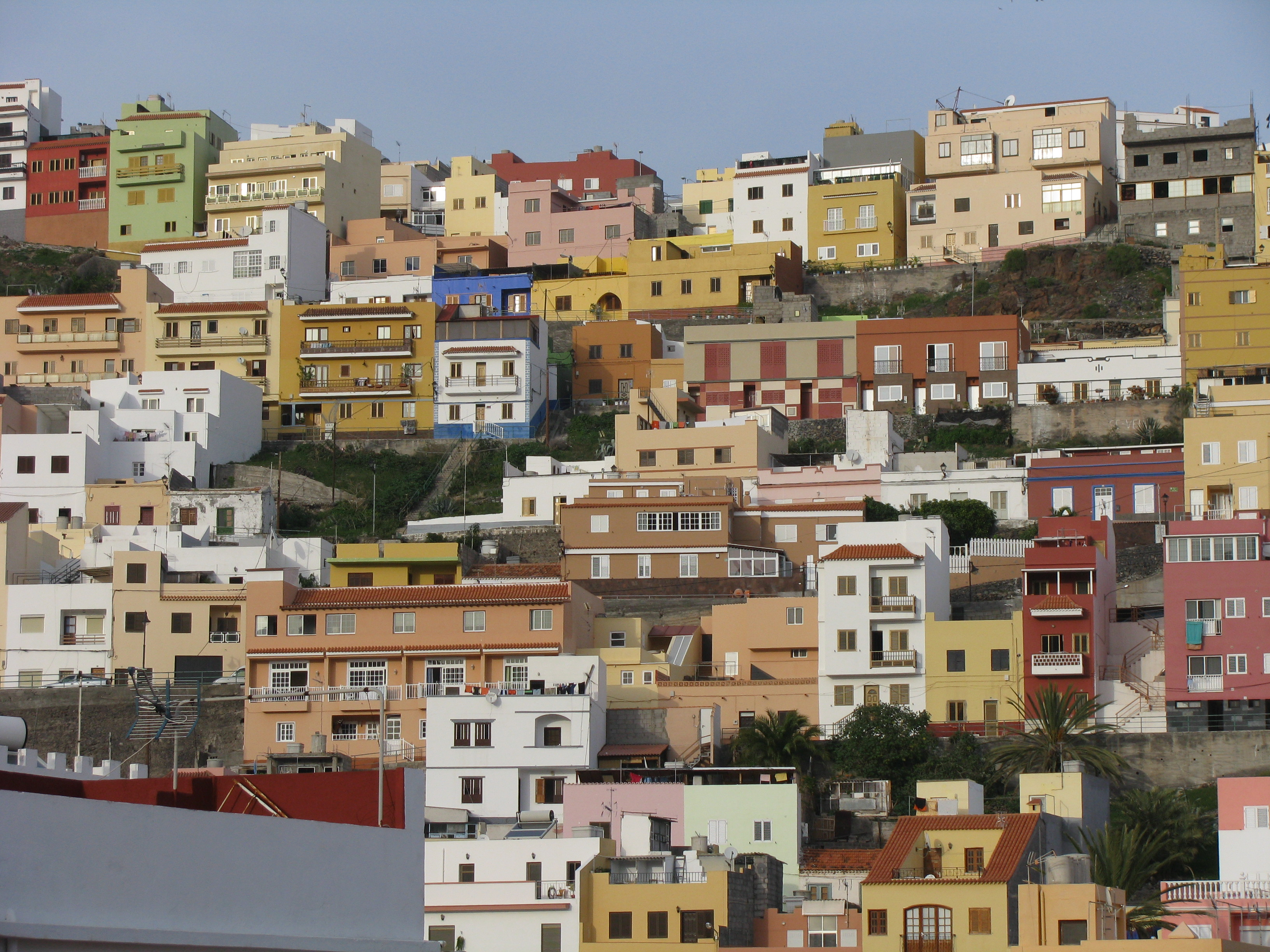
San Sebastián de La Gomera

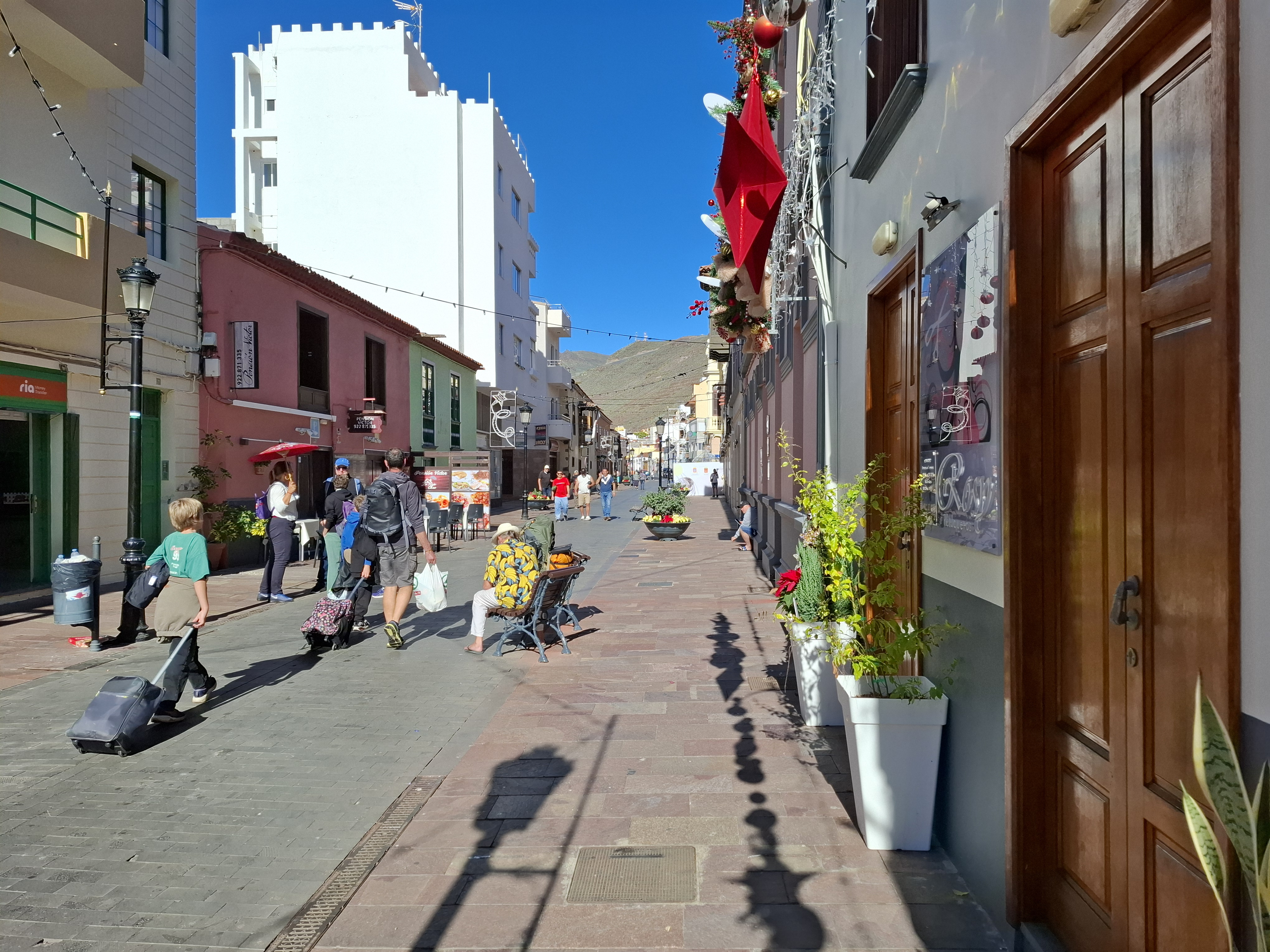
Calle Real street

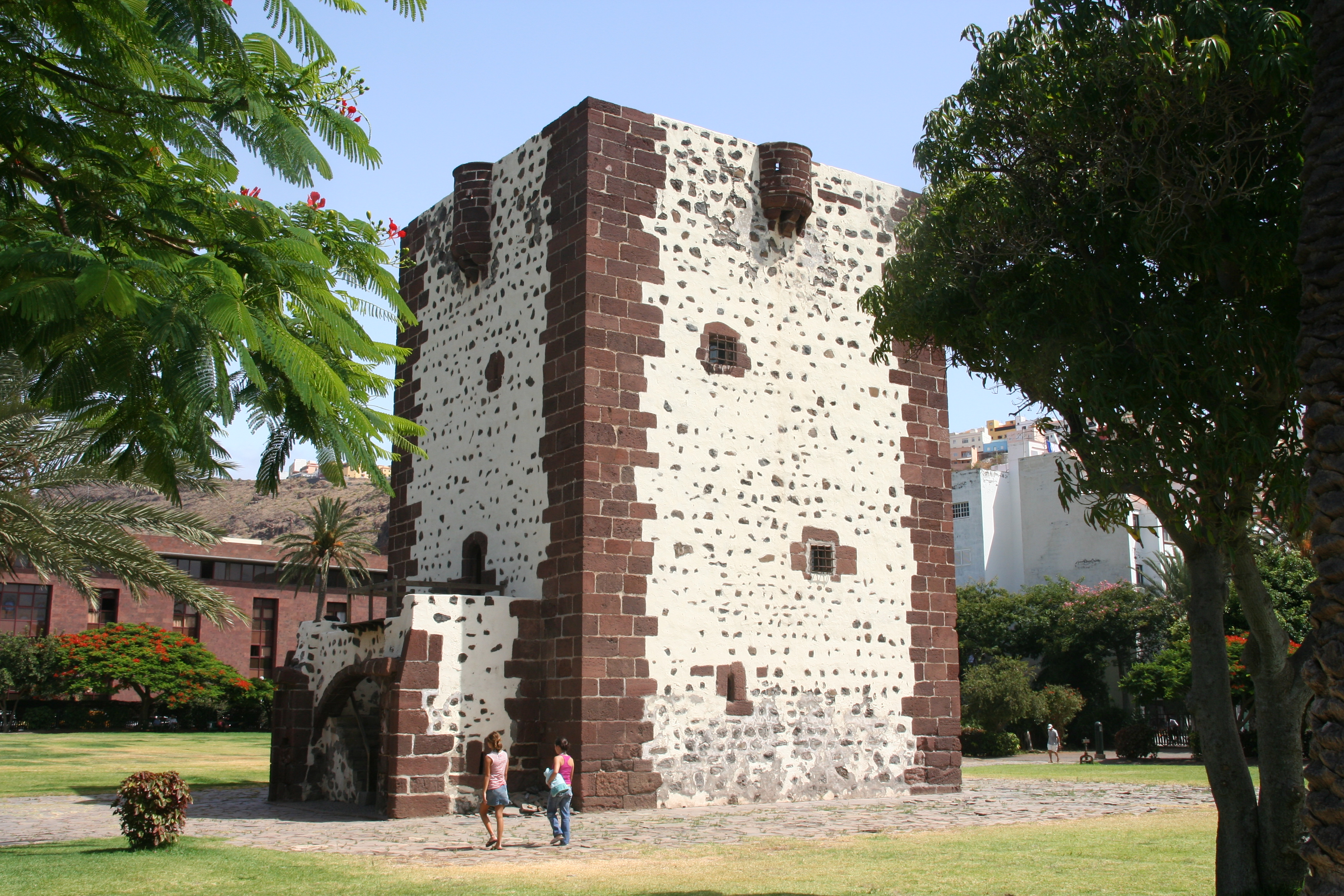
Torre del Conde

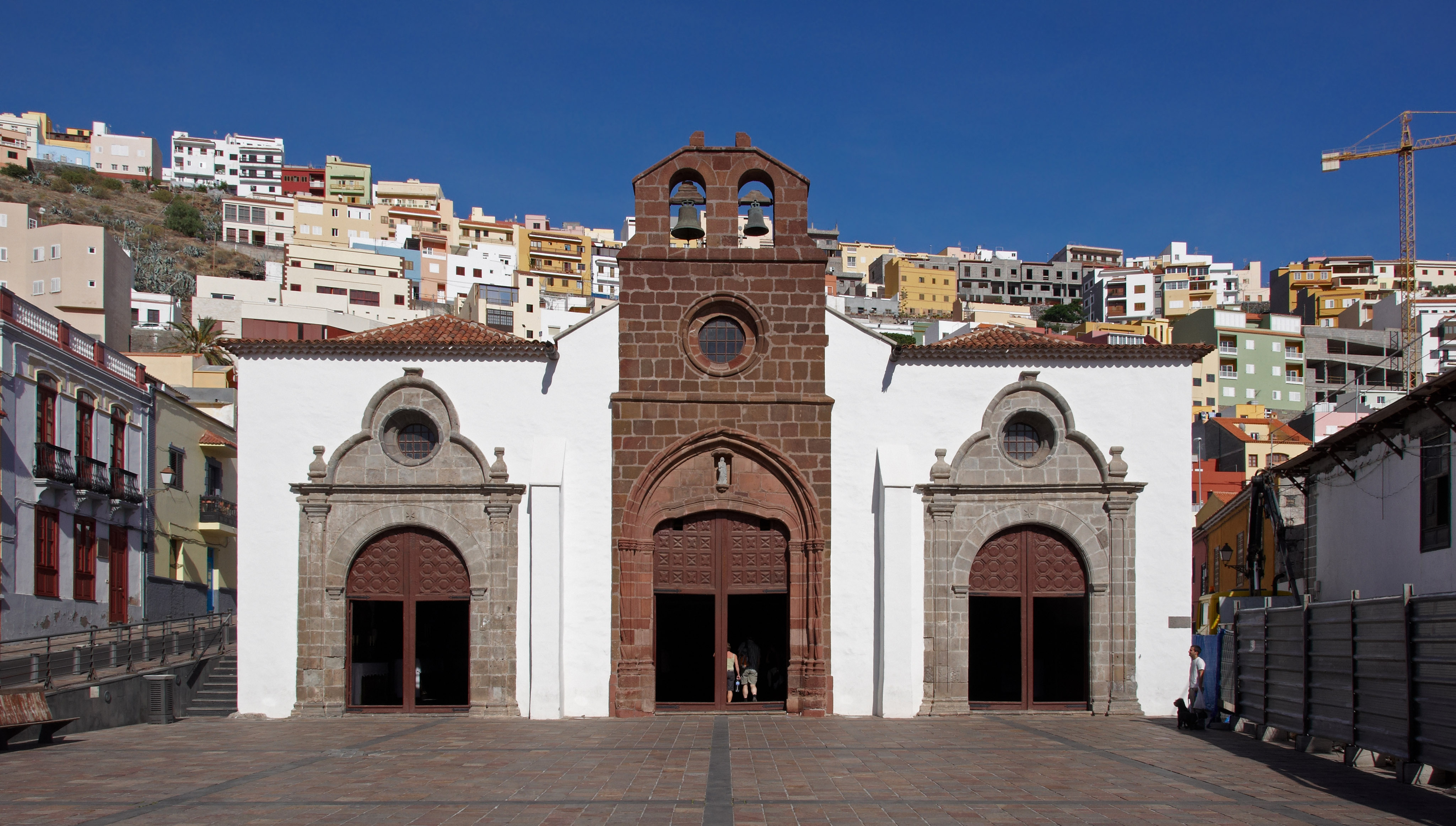
Church Iglesia de La Asunción

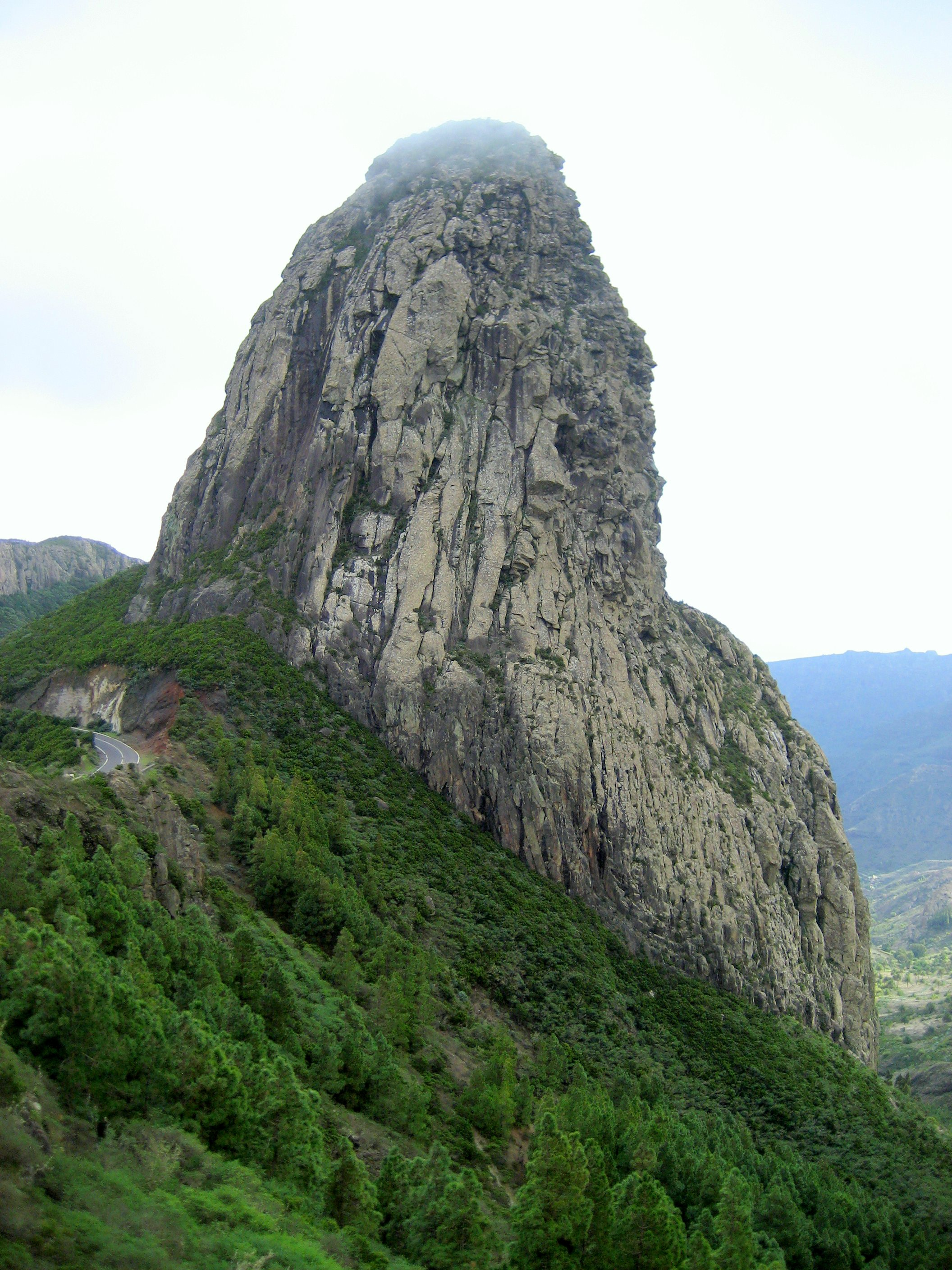
Roque de Agando

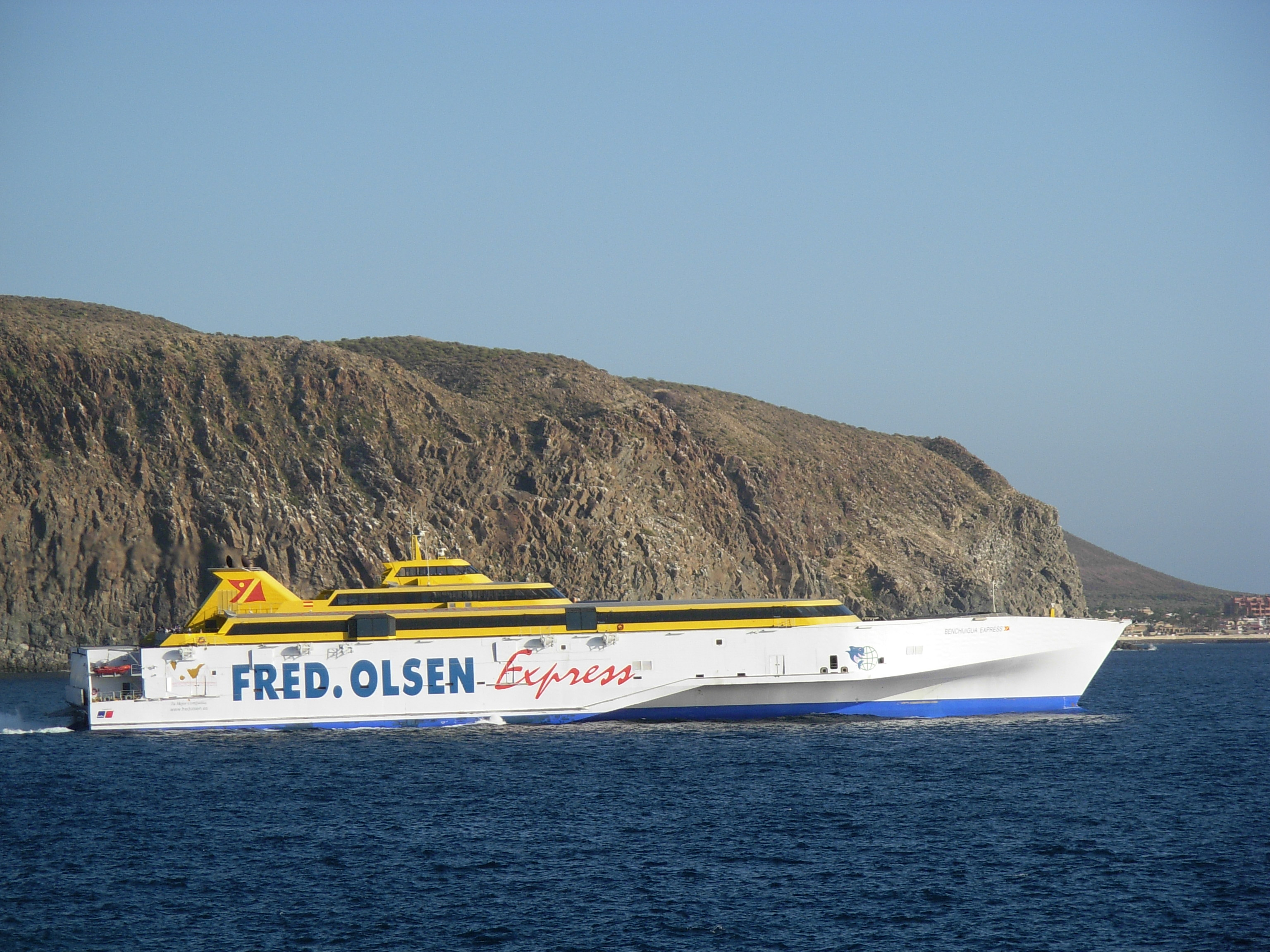
The big Fred. Olsen Express ferry

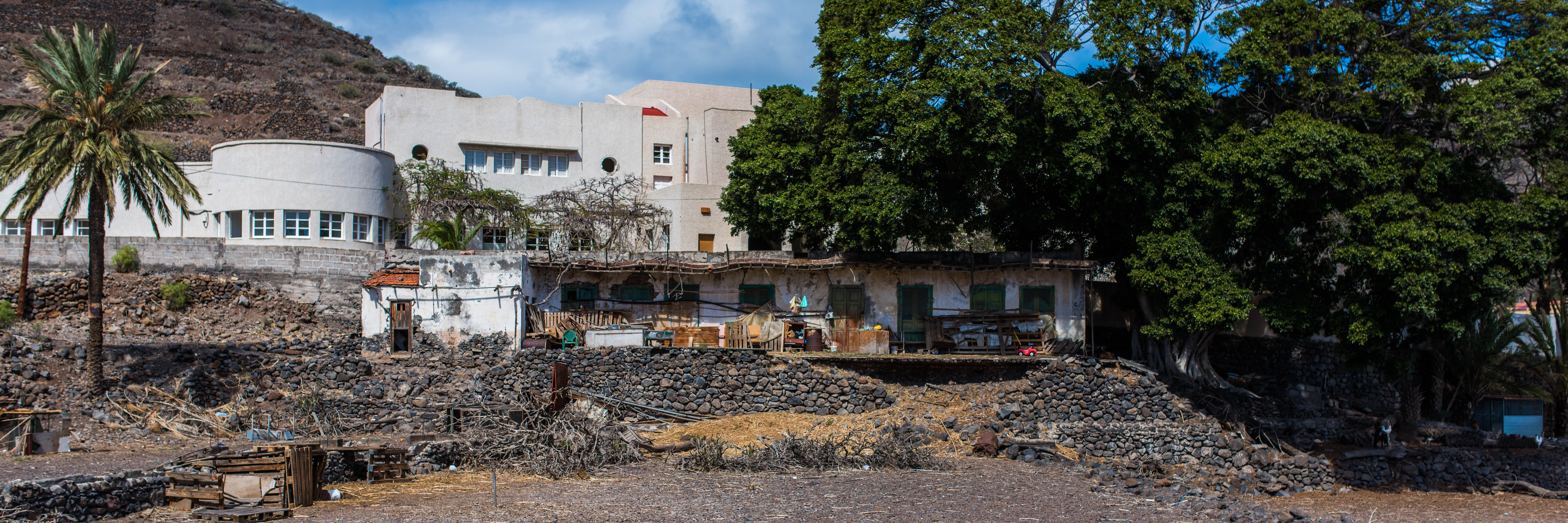
Old and new in San Sebastian

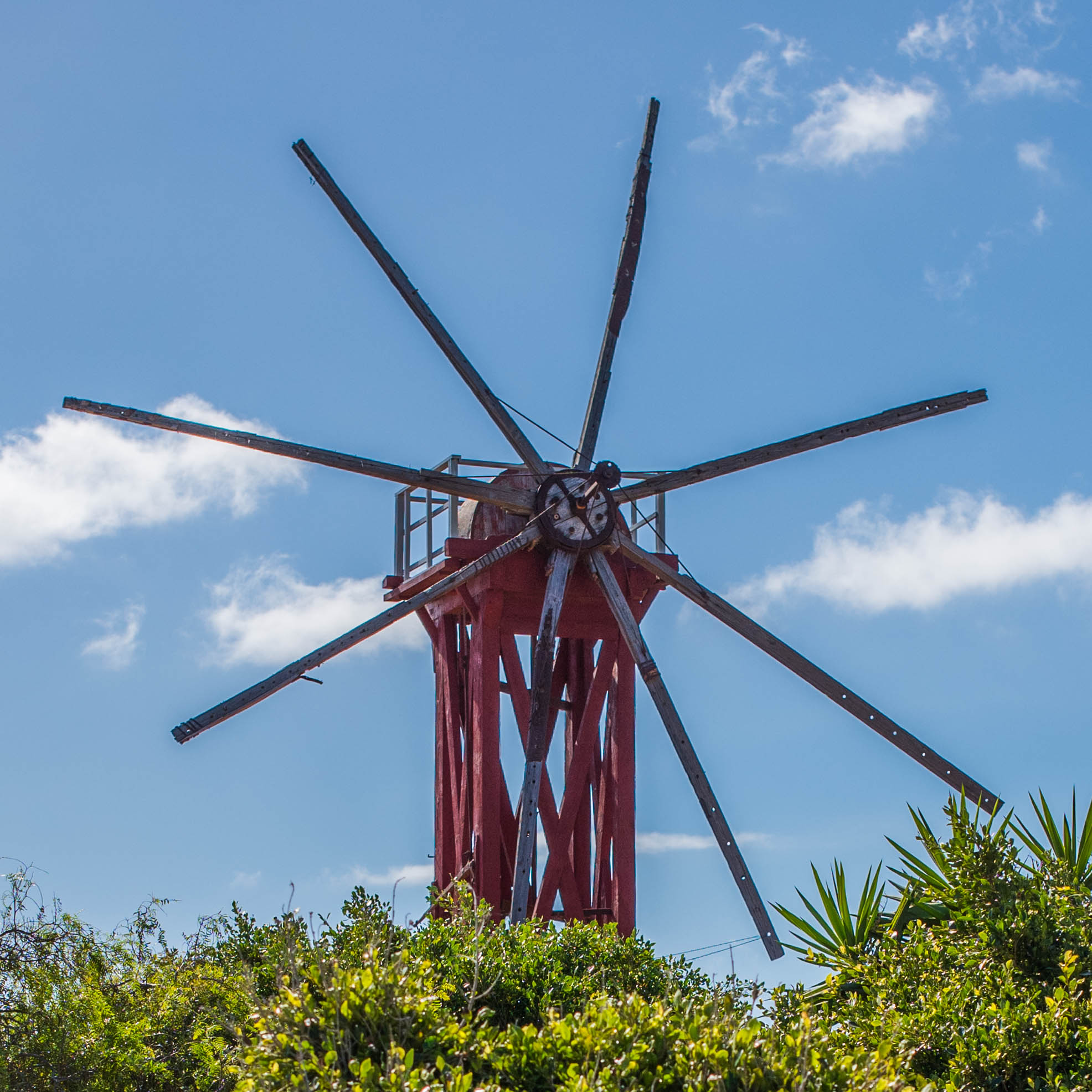
Old windmill in San Sebastian
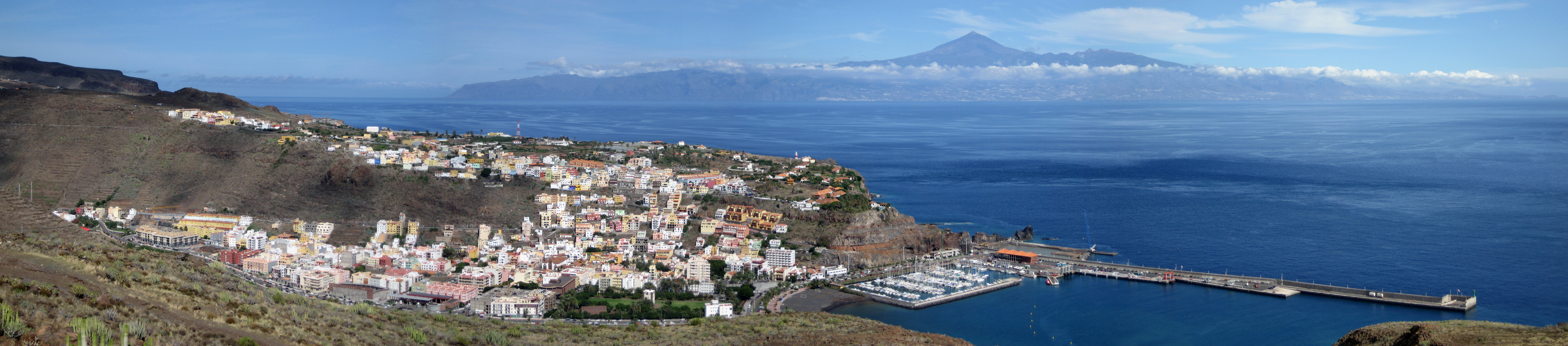
San Sebastián de la Gomera, with the towering volcano Teide in the background on the island of Tenerife
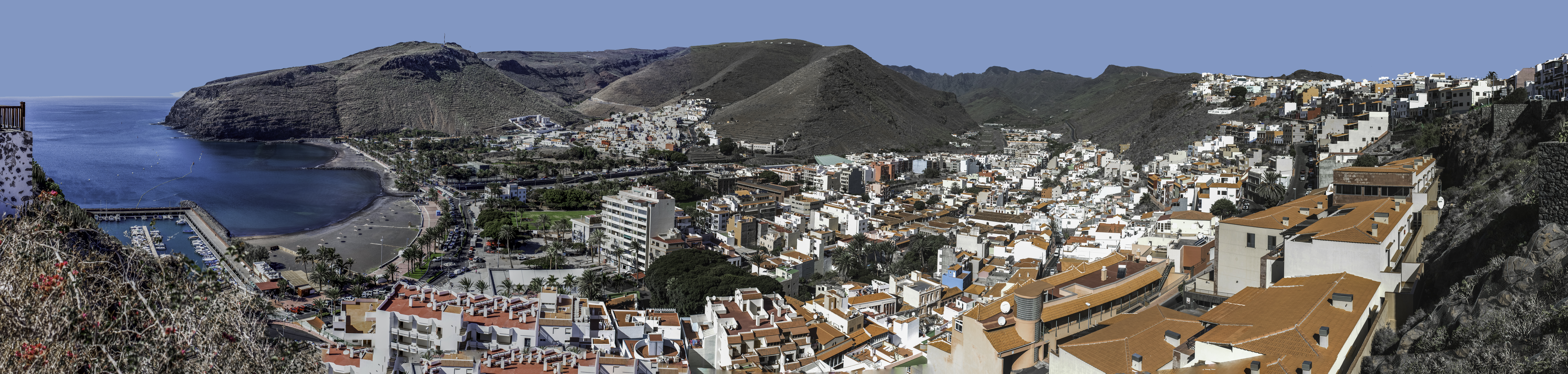
San Sebastián de la Gomera seen from the northwest

== Geography and climate ==
San Sebastián de La Gomera has a hot desert climate (Köppen: BWh; Trewartha: BWal) with an annual precipitation of only 146.8 millimetres (5.78 in) and no more than 18 days of precipitation.

Climate data for San Sebastián de La Gomera WMO ID: 60008; Climate ID: C329Z; coordinates 28°05′23″N 17°06′41″W; elevation: 15 m (49 ft); 1991–2020 normals, extremes 1989–present
Month	Jan	Feb	Mar	Apr	May	Jun	Jul	Aug	Sep	Oct	Nov	Dec	Year
Record high °C (°F)	27.1 (80.8)	30.8 (87.4)	34.9 (94.8)	33.4 (92.1)	38.6 (101.5)	36.1 (97.0)	38.9 (102.0)	41.9 (107.4)	37.4 (99.3)	36.2 (97.2)	33.7 (92.7)	29.0 (84.2)	41.9 (107.4)
Mean maximum °C (°F)	24.9 (76.8)	24.9 (76.8)	26.8 (80.2)	25.5 (77.9)	27.9 (82.2)	30.7 (87.3)	33.5 (92.3)	33.9 (93.0)	30.9 (87.6)	31.1 (88.0)	28.3 (82.9)	25.9 (78.6)	36.4 (97.5)
Mean daily maximum °C (°F)	21.6 (70.9)	21.4 (70.5)	22.0 (71.6)	22.3 (72.1)	23.3 (73.9)	25.2 (77.4)	26.8 (80.2)	27.9 (82.2)	27.4 (81.3)	26.5 (79.7)	24.6 (76.3)	22.8 (73.0)	24.3 (75.7)
Daily mean °C (°F)	18.9 (66.0)	18.8 (65.8)	19.4 (66.9)	19.8 (67.6)	21.0 (69.8)	22.8 (73.0)	24.4 (75.9)	25.3 (77.5)	25.0 (77.0)	24.0 (75.2)	22.1 (71.8)	20.1 (68.2)	21.8 (71.2)
Mean daily minimum °C (°F)	16.2 (61.2)	16.3 (61.3)	16.7 (62.1)	17.3 (63.1)	18.6 (65.5)	20.3 (68.5)	21.8 (71.2)	22.7 (72.9)	22.6 (72.7)	21.4 (70.5)	19.5 (67.1)	17.4 (63.3)	19.2 (66.6)
Mean minimum °C (°F)	13.7 (56.7)	13.6 (56.5)	13.9 (57.0)	15.1 (59.2)	16.5 (61.7)	18.4 (65.1)	20.4 (68.7)	21.1 (70.0)	20.5 (68.9)	18.8 (65.8)	16.7 (62.1)	14.8 (58.6)	12.8 (55.0)
Record low °C (°F)	11.4 (52.5)	11.9 (53.4)	11.2 (52.2)	13.0 (55.4)	14.5 (58.1)	17.0 (62.6)	18.6 (65.5)	18.4 (65.1)	19.3 (66.7)	15.5 (59.9)	11.8 (53.2)	13.2 (55.8)	11.2 (52.2)
Average precipitation mm (inches)	10.2 (0.40)	22.1 (0.87)	12.3 (0.48)	8.9 (0.35)	1.1 (0.04)	0.5 (0.02)	0.4 (0.02)	2.1 (0.08)	2.2 (0.09)	19.2 (0.76)	35.0 (1.38)	32.9 (1.30)	146.8 (5.78)
Average precipitation days (≥ 1.0 mm)	1.9	2.9	1.8	1.4	0.3	0.1	0.1	0.5	0.6	2.1	2.5	3.1	17.2
Average relative humidity (%)	67	68	69	70	71	71	70	71	73	73	70	69	70
Source: State Meteorological Agency/AEMET OpenData

== See also ==
- List of municipalities in Santa Cruz de Tenerife

== Bibliography ==
- Phillips, William D. Jr.; Phillips, Carla Rahn (1992). The Worlds of Christopher Columbus. Cambridge, UK: Cambridge University Press. ISBN 978-0-521-35097-6.
