= Villa de Agaete =

Incat high-speed catamaran

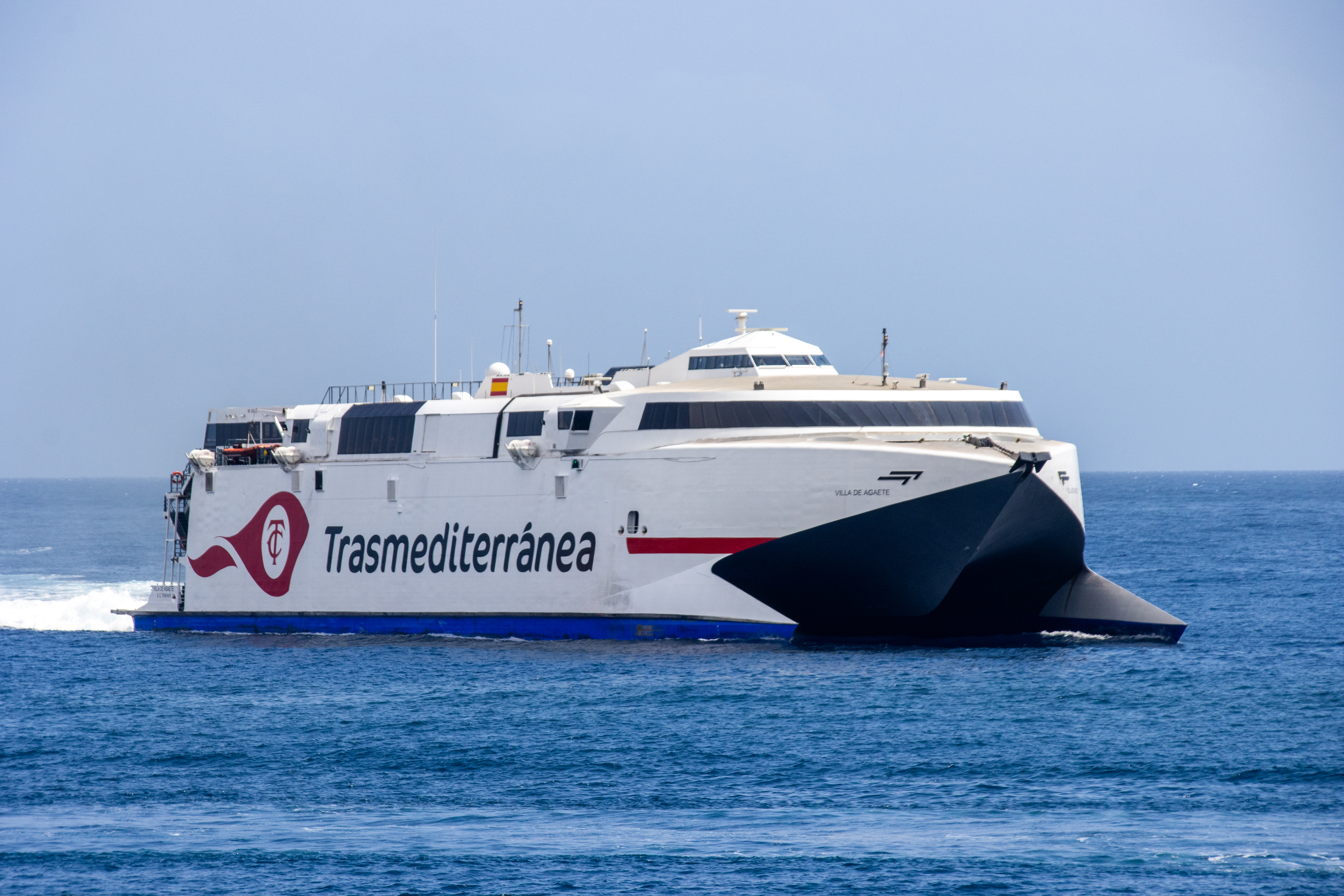
- Villa de Agaete in Tenerife

History
- Name: (1999): Avemar; (1999–2001): Avemar L; (2001–2019): Alborán; (2019–present): Villa de Agaete
- Owner: (1999–2001): Buquebus; (2001–2017): Acciona Trasmediterránea; (2017–present): Naviera Armas (Armas Trasmediterránea Group)
- Operator: (1999–2001): Buquebus; (2001–2017): Trasmediterránea; (2017–present): Naviera Armas
- Port of registry: (1999–2001): Nassau, Bahamas; (2001–present): Santa Cruz de Tenerife, Spain
- Route: Santa Cruz de Tenerife – Las Palmas de Gran Canaria; Former: Algeciras – Ceuta; Former: Barcelona – Palma de Mallorca
- Ordered: 1998
- Builder: Incat Tasmania; Hobart, Tasmania, Australia
- Yard number: 052
- Launched: 1999
- Completed: June 1999
- Acquired: 2001
- Maiden voyage: 1999
- In service: 1999
- Identification: IMO number: 9206700; Call sign: EAWK; MMSI number: 224898000
- Status: In service

General characteristics
- Class & type: Incat 96m wave-piercing catamaran
- Tonnage: 6,346 GT; 715 DWT
- Length: 96.00 m (315 ft 0 in)
- Beam: 26.20 m (85 ft 11 in)
- Draft: 3.70 m (12 ft 2 in)
- Depth: 7.65 m (25 ft 1 in)
- Decks: 3
- Ramps: Rear loading ramps
- Installed power: 4 × Caterpillar 3618 TA diesel engines (total 28,800 kW / 39,150 hp)
- Propulsion: 4 × Lips LJ145D waterjets
- Speed: 38.0 knots (70.4 km/h; 43.7 mph) (service) 42.0 knots (77.8 km/h; 48.3 mph) (max)
- Capacity: 878 passengers; 220 cars

Villa de Agaete is a 96-metre high-speed wave-piercing catamaran passenger and vehicle ferry built in 1999 by Incat Tasmania. Originally entering service for Buquebus as Avemar (later Avemar L), she was acquired in 2001 by Trasmediterránea and operated for nearly two decades as Alborán across the Strait of Gibraltar and Mediterranean routes. Renamed Villa de Agaete in 2019 following Naviera Armas' integration with Trasmediterránea, the vessel subsequently operated high-speed inter-island routes in the Canary Islands connecting Santa Cruz de Tenerife and Las Palmas de Gran Canaria, as well as returning to services across the Strait of Gibraltar between Algeciras and Ceuta.

== Service ==
The catamaran, the third of a series of six sister units, was launched on 29 May 1999 at the Incat specialist shipyard in Hobart with the name Avemar and delivered on 1 June 1999 to the Uruguayan company Buquebus, for which she entered service on 31 July under the banner of the Spanish subsidiary, on the routes between Barcelona and Palma de Mallorca, replacing the Catalonia L. However, just a year later, on 14 September 2000, the company decided to discontinue the route due to financial difficulties and on 29 September transferred the fast ferry to Gibraltar, where she was decommissioned and put up for sale. On 21 December of the following year, after a couple of months of disarmament, the catamaran was purchased by its compatriot Trasmediterránea for 5.824 billion pesetas, by which it was renamed Alborán and put on the following 23 April in the connections between Algeciras and Ceuta, Malaga and Melilla and between the second enclave and Almería, in competition with the units of the previous shipping company, including the Albayzin. In the same year the Albayzin was then temporarily employed also in the connections between Barcelona and Palma de Mallorca, returning later to operate between the two shores of the Alborán Sea.

In March 2014, after 15 years of service in the Mediterranean, the catamaran was chartered to the parent company Naviera Armas, entering service on the routes between Los Cristianos and El Hierro, replacing the Alcantara Dos. In the following years, the catamaran continued to operate in the Canary Islands, being occasionally transferred to the Alboran Sea or the Strait of Gibraltar, connecting Spain and Morocco.

On 8 November 2019, while sailing between Las Palmas de Gran Canaria and Santa Cruz de Tenerife, the catamaran collided with the barge Trames Uno, carrying a container, suffering partial damage to the port side, which was subsequently repaired at the AstCan shipyard in Las Palmas de Gran Canaria, where it remained until 25 November. However, once repaired, the catamaran ended its charter to the parent company and returned to Trasmediterránea, from which it was renamed Villa de Agaete in August 2019 and put on 29 November on the routes between Santa Cruz de Tenerife, Las Palmas de Gran Canaria and Morro Jablereplacing the Ciudad de Ceuta, where it operated until 2025, when it was again transferred to the routes between Algeciras and Ceuta, again replacing the Ciudad de Ceuta. On 25 August 2025, with the definitive cessation of activities by the shipping company, it passed together with part of the fleet to DFDS.

== Sister ships ==
- Manannan
- Giga Jet
- Bencomo Express
- Bentago Express
- Volcan de Teno
