= Buenavista Express =

Ferry built in Spain

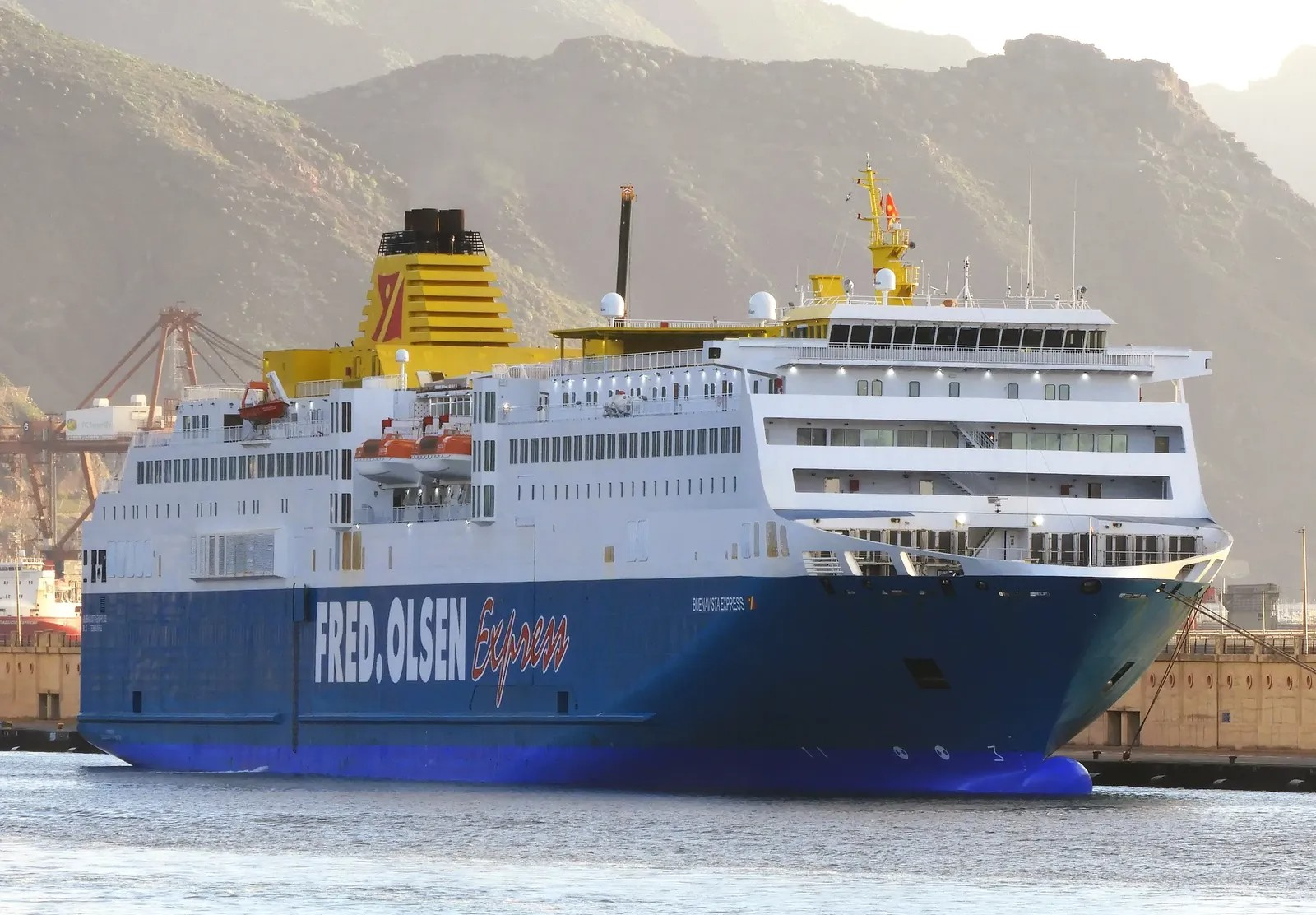
- Buenavista Express in Santa Cruz de Tenerife

History
- Name: 2001–2019: Fortuny; 2019–2024: Ciudad Autónoma Melilla; 2024–2025: Fortuny; 2025–present: Buenavista Express
- Owner: 2001–2025: Trasmediterránea; 2025: Liberty Lines; 2025–present: Fred. Olsen Express
- Operator: 2001–2025: Trasmediterránea; 2026–present: Fred. Olsen Express / Baleària
- Port of registry: Santa Cruz de Tenerife, Spain
- Route: Huelva ↔ Las Palmas de Gran Canaria / Santa Cruz de Tenerife
- Ordered: 28 December 1999
- Builder: Izar Construcciones Navales SA; Puerto Real, Spain
- Yard number: 86
- Laid down: 28 December 1999
- Launched: 9 December 2000
- Completed: 8 June 2001
- Acquired: 29 September 2025
- Maiden voyage: June 2001
- In service: June 2001 (as Fortuny); 24 January 2026 (as Buenavista Express)
- Identification: IMO number: 9216585; Call sign: EBTO; MMSI number: 224675000
- Status: In service

General characteristics
- Class & type: Ro-Pax Cruise Ferry
- Tonnage: 26,916 GT; 14,308 NT; 4,834 DWT
- Length: 172.6 m (566 ft 3 in)
- Beam: 26.2 m (85 ft 11 in)
- Draft: 6.2 m (20 ft 4 in)
- Decks: 9
- Ramps: Stern loading ramps
- Installed power: 4 × Wärtsilä 8L46A diesel engines (total 28,960 kW)
- Propulsion: 2 × controllable pitch propellers
- Speed: 21.5 knots (39.8 km/h; 24.7 mph) (service) / 23.5 knots (43.5 km/h; 27.0 mph) (max)
- Capacity: 1,250 passengers (748 cabin berths); 390 cars / 1,850 lane metres
- Crew: ~60
- Notes: Sister ship to Ciudad de Granada

Buenavista Express is a Spanish-built Ro-Pax ferry operated by Fred. Olsen Express and Baleària between mainland Spain and the Canary Islands. Originally launched in 2001 as Fortuny for Trasmediterránea, and later renamed Ciudad Autónoma Melilla, the 172-meter vessel was acquired by Fred. Olsen Express in late 2025, renamed Buenavista Express, and placed into service in January 2026.

== Service ==
The ferry, the second of a series of two sister units, was launched on 9 December 2000 at the Izar Construcciones Navales SA shipyard in Puerto Real with the name Fortuny and delivered on 8 June 2001 to Trasmediterránea, for which she entered service in the same month on the routes between Valencia, Barcelona and Palma de Mallorca, joining her sister ship Sorolla.

From 15 October to 18 November 2002, it operated on the routes between Cadiz and the Canary Islands. In the same month, it returned to service on its own route. On 16 May 2006, the new service between Bilbao and Portsmouth was inaugurated. However, despite initial high expectations, on 20 January 2007 the new service between the two sides of the Channel was cancelled, and the ferry returned to operating on the connections between the continent and the Canary Islands.

On 11 April 2010, during the maneuvers to enter Palma de Mallorca, the ferry violently collided with the dock. In the accident, two passengers suffered serious injuries and were transferred to the hospital in the city. On 5 February 2011, while docking in Valencia, she collided again with the quay, causing a breach in the hull in the stern area. Following this, the ferry was taken out of service and repaired, being temporarily replaced by the Murillo.

In May 2015, with the assignment to Trasmediterránea of the connections between Melilla, Malaga and Almería, it was transferred to the latter together with the sister ship Sorolla and the catamaran Milenium Dos. On 1 February 2019, during a stop at the shipyard for ordinary maintenance, it was renamed Ciudad Autónoma Melilla. In April 2024 it was again renamed Fortuny. On 9 January 2025 it was transferred to the connections between Las Palmas de Gran Canaria, Arrecife and Agadir, where it still operates today.

In July 2025, Trasmediterránea announced the signing of an agreement for the sale of the ferry to Liberty Lines. Consequently, on 9 September the ferry was laid up in Almería, in preparation for delivery to Fred. Olsen Express, to whom it was immediately transferred on charter following its acquisition by the Italian company. Subsequently, upon delivery on 29 September, the ferry was purchased outright by the Spanish company and renamed Buenavista Express. After a long period of construction, carried out between Gran Canaria and the Navantia Fene shipyards in Ferrol, the ferry entered service on 24 January 2026 on the routes between Huelva, Las Palmas de Gran Canaria and Santa Cruz de Tenerife, replacing the Sicilia, where it joined the Marie Curie, operating under the banner of the joint venture with Fred. Olsen Express and the Baleària.

== Technical specifications and equipment ==
The ferry is powered by four Wärtsilä 8L46A four-stroke, eight - cylinder diesel engines, each with an output of 7240 kW. The engines drive two controllable pitch propellers in pairs via reduction gearboxes. The ship is equipped with two electrically driven bow thrusters, each with an output of 1000 kW.

For power generation, two Leroy-Somer shaft generators driven by the main engines, each with a power output of 1570 kW, three Leroy-Somer generators driven by Wärtsilä diesel engines, each with a power output of 1620 kW, and one generator driven by a MAN diesel engine with a power output of 514 kW are available. In addition, an emergency generator driven by a MAN diesel engine with a power output of 250 kW has been installed.

The ferry has three vehicle decks on decks 3, 5, and 6, with the vehicle deck on deck 6 being partially height-adjustable. Access to deck 3 (main deck) is via two stern ramps. These are each 18 m long and 8.5 m wide. The stern ramps can support a load of 96 t. The vehicle decks are connected to each other by onboard ramps. There are 1809 lane meters available on the vehicle decks. The usable height on decks 3 and 5 is 4.7 m, and on deck 6 it is 2.2 m.

The passenger facilities are located on decks 7 to 9. The passenger cabins are on deck 7. A total of 201 cabins are available, including 32 twin and 165 quad cabins. Deck 8 offers lounges with reclining seats for passengers. This deck also houses the public areas, including lounges, a fast-food restaurant, a bar, a truck drivers' lounge, a cinema, a shop, and a children's play area. On deck 9, above, there is an à la carte restaurant, a disco, a fitness area, a sauna and solarium, and a swimming pool. The cabins for the ship's crew are located at the front of this deck. Various rooms for ship operations, such as offices and technical service rooms, are also located here. Additional service rooms are located on the deck above, with the bridge situated at the front of the superstructure. The open cams extend beyond the beam of the ship. The ship is equipped with fin stabilizers.
