= Betancuria Express =

High-speed catamaran

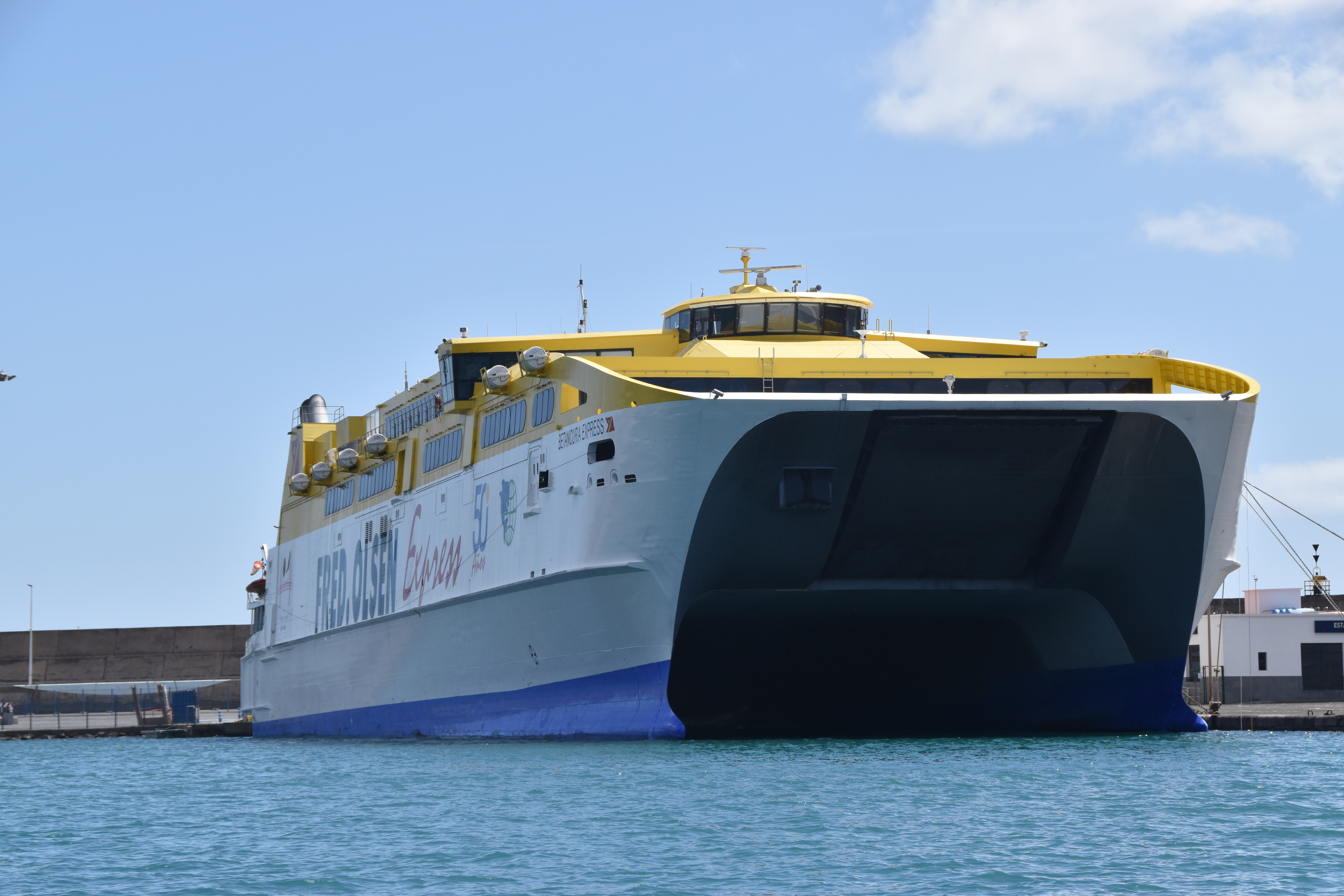
- Betancuria Express in Morro Jable

History

Denmark
- Name: Leonora Christina
- Owner: BornholmerFærgen
- Port of registry: Denmark, Rønne
- Route: Rønne - Ystad
- Ordered: 2 April 2009
- Builder: Austal, Perth
- Yard number: 246
- Laid down: 3 March 2010
- Launched: 28 January 2011
- Completed: 10 May 2011
- Maiden voyage: 18 May 2011
- In service: 22 June 2011
- Identification: Callsign: OWGM2

Spain
- Name: Betancuria Express
- Owner: Fred. Olsen Express
- Port of registry: Spain, Santa Cruz de Tenerife
- Route: Las Palmas de Gran Canaria - Morro Jable
- In service: 15 October 2018
- Identification: Callsign: EAKD; IMO number: 9557848; MMSI number: 219282000; DNV ID: 30260

General characteristics
- Class & type: + 1A1 HSLC, R2, Passenger Car Ferry A, EO
- Tonnage: 10,369 GT
- Length: 115 m
- Beam: 26.2 m
- Height: 28.5 m
- Draught: 3.8 m
- Depth: 8.5 m
- Decks: 5 (3 car decks / 2 passenger decks
- Ramps: 2 (stern and bow)
- Installed power: 4 x MAN 20V 28/33D diesel engines; 36,400 kW combined
- Propulsion: 4 x Rolls-Royce KaMeWa 125 SIII waterjets
- Speed: 38 knots (70 km/h)
- Capacity: 1,598 passengers; 357 cars
- Crew: 22

Betancuria Express is a fast passenger and vehicle ferry operated by the Canary Islands ferry company Fred. Olsen Express on the route between Gran Canaria and Fuerteventura. It was built in 2011 by Austal in Perth, Western Australia as Leonora Christina for BornholmerFærgen.

== History ==
Betancuria Express was built by Austal in Perth, Western Australia for BornholmerFærgen as Leonora Christina, being completed in March 2011. It commenced operating between Rønne in Denmark and Ystad in Sweden in June 2011.

In April 2017, Leonora Christina was sold to Fred. Olsen Express, although the transfer did not take place until the September 2018. Since October 2018, the ship, now renamed as Betancuria Express, serves the route between Las Palmas de Gran Canaria and Morro Jable, in the south of Fuerteventura.
