= Benchi Express =

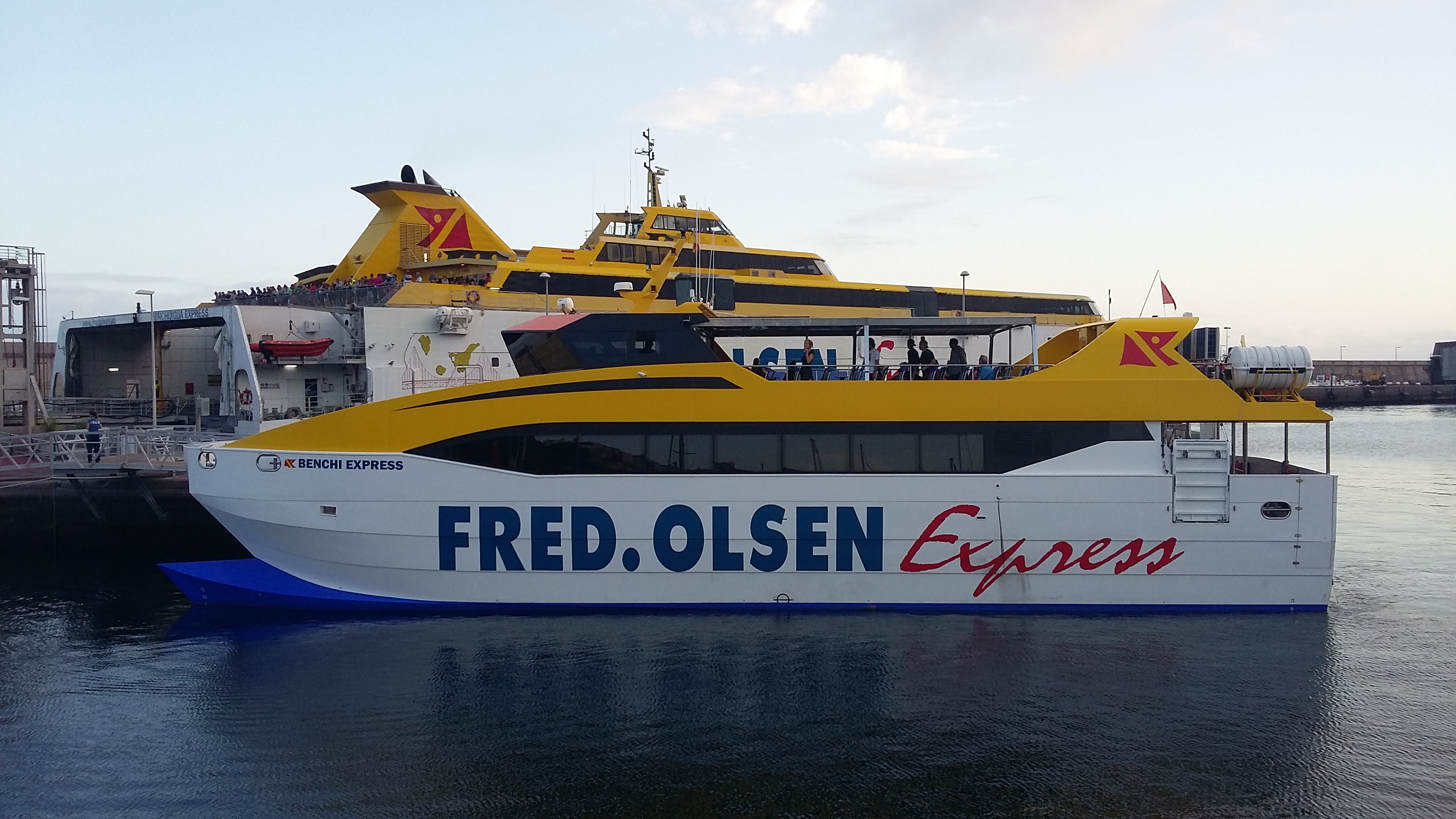
- Benchi Express

History

Spain
- Name: Benchi Express
- Owner: Fred Olsen, S.A
- Operator: Fred. Olsen Express
- Route: San Sebastián de La Gomera - Playa Santiago - Valle Gran Rey
- Builder: Drassanes Dalmau
- Launched: June 2017
- Acquired: September 2017
- Identification: Call sign: EARP; IMO number: 9832236; MMSI number: 225987686
- Status: In service

General characteristics
- Tonnage: 283 GT
- Length: 28.70 m (94.2 ft)
- Beam: 9.00 m (29.5 ft)
- Decks: 2
- Installed power: 2 Caterpillar C32 ACERT, 2,134 kW in total
- Speed: 19 kn (35 km/h; 22 mph)
- Capacity: 250 passengers
- Crew: 4

Benchi Express is a catamaran ferry operated by the Spanish-Norwegian shipping company Fred. Olsen Express for local transport connecting ports on the island of La Gomera (Canary Islands). It was delivered to Fred. Olsen in September 2017 and has been operating the route between the towns of San Sebastián de La Gomera, Playa Santiago and Valle Gran Rey since then. The ship was purpose-built for this route by Drassanes Dalmau, based in Arenys de Mar (Barcelona).

Towns served by Benchi Express

== Design and construction ==
The Benchi Express is a passenger transport catamaran, purpose-built in Arenys de Mar by Drassanes Dalmau for Fred. Olsen Express. The construction is entirely of composite material. The vessel is 28.70 metres (94.2 ft) long and 9.00 metres (29.53 ft) wide, making it the smallest ship in the Fred. Olsen Express fleet, and can reach speeds of 19 knots (35 km/h; 22 mph).

The ship is powered by two Caterpillar C32 ACERT diesel engines capable of providing a combined power of 2,134 kW.

The Benchi Express can transport up to 250 passengers on two decks: the main deck has a capacity of 150 passengers while the upper open-air deck can hold another 100 passengers. The upper deck can be covered if required. There is also space for eight bicycles or motorcycles.

== Predecessors ==
Fred. Olsen Express first operated the local La Gomera route connecting San Sebastián, Playa Santiago and Valle Gran Rey between 2009 and 2012 using another ferry, also called Benchi Express. This vessel was 40 metres (130 ft) long, could transport 300 passengers and had a cruise speed of over 30 knots (56 km/h; 35 mph). The ferry also connected the island's capital, San Sebastián, to the town of Los Cristianos in Tenerife, thus serving as a sea link between the two islands.
