= Fred. Olsen Express =

Ferry service in the Canary Islands

Fred. Olsen, S.A.
- Type: Subsidiary
- Industry: Shipping
- Founded: 1974
- Headquarters: Tenerife, Canary Islands
- Area served: Canary Islands
- Products: Ferry transport
- Owner: Fred. Olsen & Co.
- Parent: Bonheur and Ganger Rolf
- Website: www.fredolsen.es

Fred. Olsen Express is an inter-island ferry service based in the Canary Islands, Spain. It operates a fleet of six modern fast ferries on five routes. Its fleet includes a trimaran fast ferry, the Benchijigua Express, which was the first such vehicle in the world when it entered service in 2005. The company is owned by the Norwegian Olsen family-controlled Fred. Olsen & Co. and Bonheur, which among other things also owns the shipping companies Fred. Olsen Cruise Lines and First Olsen Tankers.

== History ==
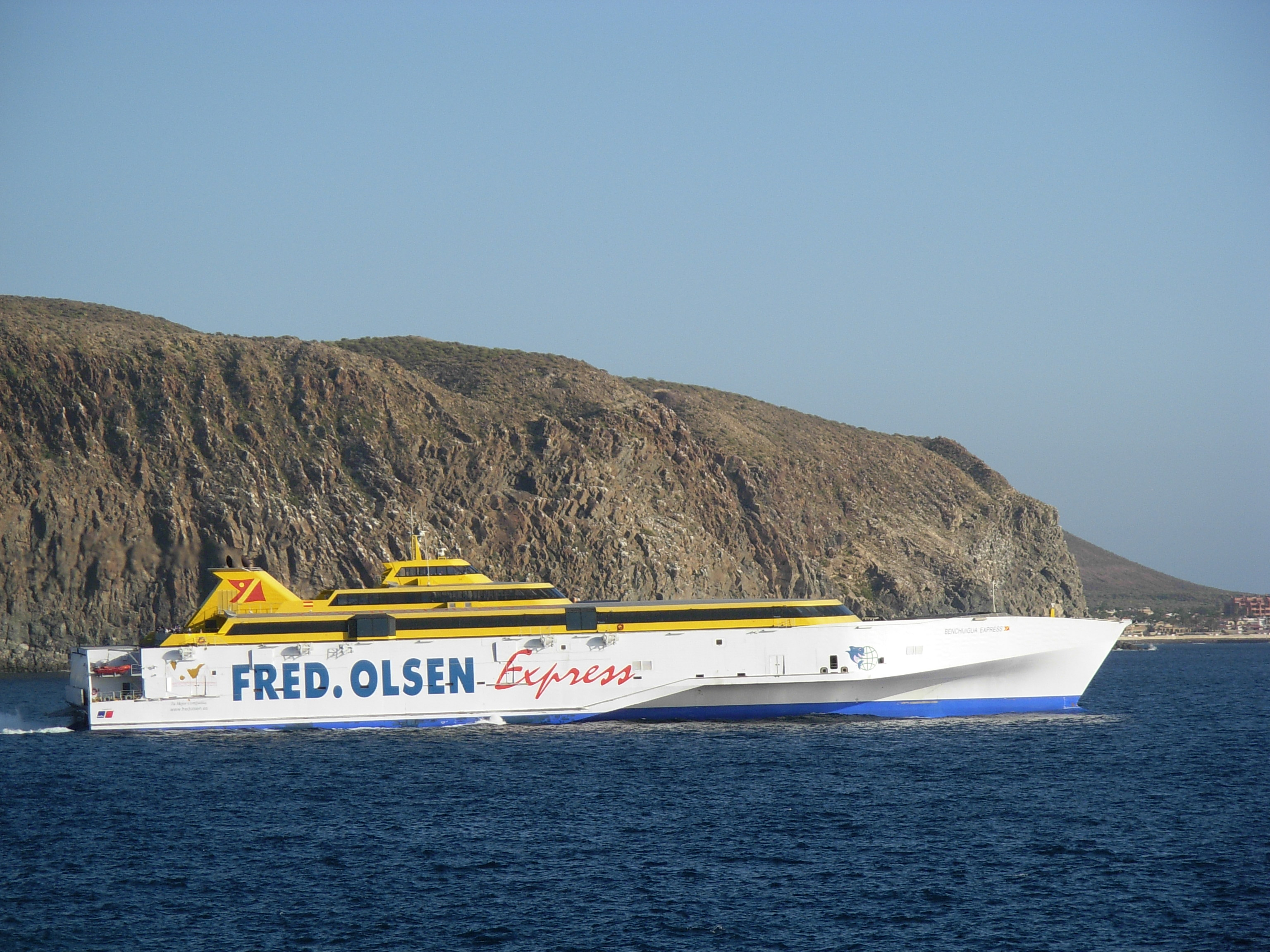
Benchijigua Express

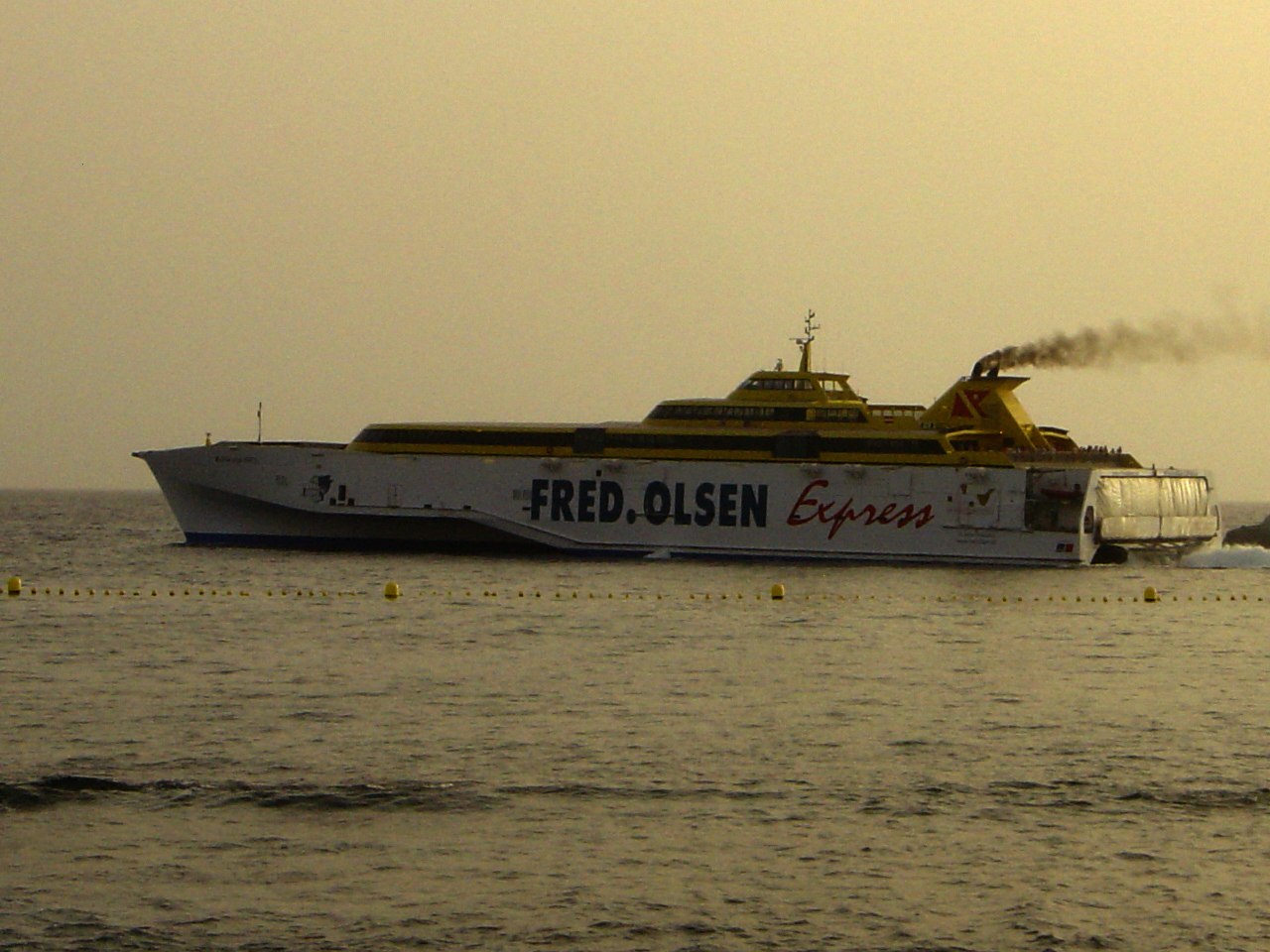
Benchijigua Express heading into a sunset en route to La Gomera

Fred. Olsen Express was founded in 1974 as Ferry Gomera, S.A. The first sailing took place July 8, 1974, when a ferry set sail from the Gomeran capital of San Sebastian de La Gomera for the town of Los Cristianos in Tenerife. The first ferry to operate the route was christened the Benchijigua, which is named after a small village located in the south of La Gomera. It also was in keeping with a long tradition of Fred. Olsen which was that all name of the company's ships should begin with the letter B.

Until this first sailing the island of La Gomera had practically been isolated and was only ever visited by a single boat which came to collect bananas and tomatoes, that the island produced for export to Europe, and in return dropped off supplies for the island. It was the opening of this first route by Fred Olsen that really brought about changes for the Gomerans.

The route between La Gomera and Tenerife initially operated three times a day in each direction and took 80 minutes, and was capable of handling 400 passengers and around 60 cars. As a gesture of goodwill a free coach was provided from Los Cristianos in the South of Tenerife to the capital Santa Cruz de Tenerife. Five years after the launch of the service a new larger and faster ferry was added, the Bonanza. The ship had previously been served with the company in Northern Europe, but was transferred to the Gomera route. Then again in 1989 still trading as Ferry Gomera the company introduced a route from Los Cristianos to San Sebastian de La Gomera using a ferry named the SES Sant’ Agata (later the Gomera Express) which was promoted as "fast and comfortable". The crossing took only 35 minutes. Also in 1989 a route was established between Playa Blanca, Lanzarote and Corralejo, Fuerteventura which was operated by the ferry Betancuria.

The route had also carried nearly 900 patients as well as 20 additional critical emergency crossings. In 1994 Fred. Olsen signed a deal with the Canarian Postal Service to offer an on-board post office on board the Benchijigua Express. A fourth daily service was also added. The year 2000 saw the entry of the Benchijigua Express on the Gomera route. In 2005, a brand new trimaran, also named Benchijigua Express entered service on the Tenerife to La Gomera and Tenerife to La Palma route. The old Benchijigua Express was renamed Bentago Express and placed on the Santa Cruz de Tenerife to Gran Canaria route.

== Fleet ==
The company currently operates six large fast ferries, all built by the two Australian companies that dominate the fast ferry market: three by Austal of Perth and the other three by Incat shipyards in Hobart. In addition, a smaller ferry operates locally on La Gomera.

=== Benchijigua Express ===
The Benchijigua Express is a 126-metre (413 ft) long fast trimaran, operated by the company between Los Cristianos in Tenerife, San Sebastián de La Gomera and Santa Cruz de La Palma. It was delivered to Olsen in April 2005 by Australian shipbuilding giant Austal.

=== Bencomo Express and Bentago Express ===
The HSC Bentago Express and HSC Bencomo Express are 96-metre (315 ft) fast catamarans built by Incat in Hobart, Tasmania. Both were delivered to Olsen in the late 1990s / early 2000s. They are operated by the company between Santa Cruz de Tenerife and Agaete (Puerto de las Nieves) in Gran Canaria.

=== Bocayna Express ===
The Bocayna Express is a 66-metre (217 ft) fast catamaran, making it the smallest in the current fleet of inter-island ferries. (Note: The smaller Benchi Express is used for local transport on the island of La Gomera.) It is operated by the company between Playa Blanca in Lanzarote and Corralejo in Fuerteventura, across La Bocayna strait. The ferry has operated the 15-minute crossing since 2003 when it was delivered by Australian shipbuilder Austal. It is one of the three ferries in the fleet made by Austal.

=== Bonanza Express ===
The Bonanza Express is a 96-metre (315 ft) Incat fast catamaran, similar to the Bentago Express and the Bencomo Express, operated by the company on the route between Las Palmas de Gran Canaria and Arrecife (Lanzarote). Introduced in 1999, it was the company's first fast ferry. The Bonanza Express was meant to be sold to Euroferries for a service between Ramsgate and Boulogne, but the deal fell through and the Bonanza Express has found its way back with Fred. Olsen Express in the Canary Islands.

=== Benchi Express ===
The Benchi Express is a 28.7-metre (94 ft) catamaran with a capacity of 250 passengers used locally on the island of La Gomera to connect the island's capital, San Sebastián, with Playa Santiago and Valle Gran Rey. It was launched in June 2017 at the Drassanes Dalmau shipyard in Barcelona.

The previous Benchi Express was a 40-metre (130 ft) catamaran delivered to Olsen in March 2009. Until January 2012, the ferry connected Los Cristianos in Tenerife with San Sebastián de la Gomera, then going on to connect Playa Santiago and Valle Gran Rey, both in La Gomera. The service came about following the collapse of Garajonay Express. The main crossing took 55 minutes from Los Cristianos to San Sebastián. The ferry was acquired from Italian operator SNAV. The ship was previously called SNAV Aquila.

=== Betancuria Express ===
The HSC Betancuria Express was the world's largest high speed catamaran when it was launched, and is used by Fred. Olsen Express on the route connecting Las Palmas de Gran Canaria with the port of Morro Jable in Fuerteventura. The company bought the 112-metre (367 ft) Austal ferry in April 2017; it was previously named HSC Leonora Christina and operated between Denmark and Sweden. After a charter back contract expired on 31 August 2018, the ship was renamed Betancuria Express and operates from Las Palmas de Gran Canaria.

=== Two new 118-metre trimarans ===
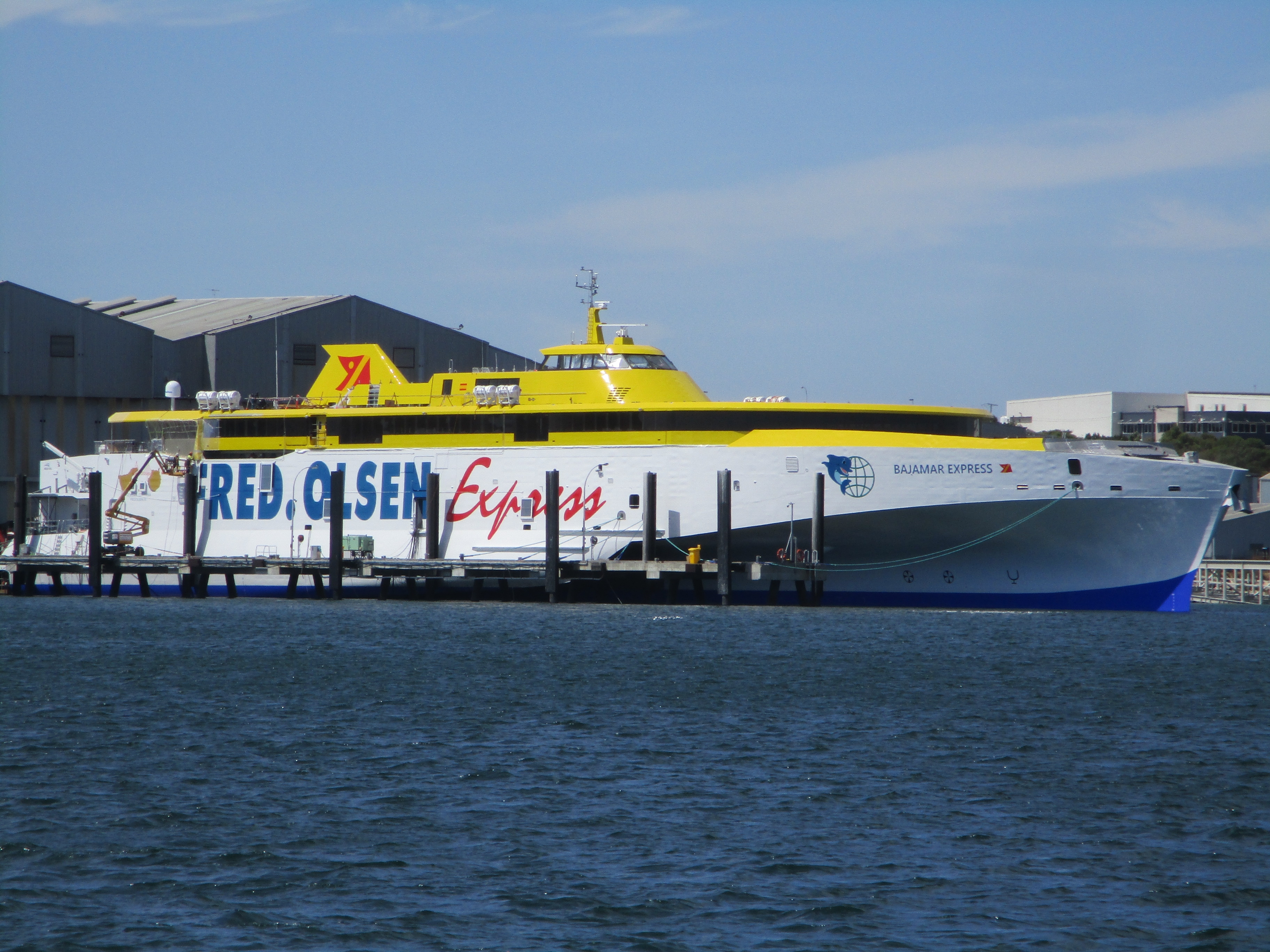
Bajamar Express at Austal's shipyard in Henderson, Western Australia in March 2020

In October 2017, five months after its competitor Naviera Armas announced the order of Volcán de Tagoro, a 10,800 GT, 1,200 passenger Incat fast catamaran ferry for the Canaries at a price of €74 million, Fred. Olsen Express responded by ordering two 118-metre (387 ft) trimarans from the Australian shipbuilder Austal at a price of €126 million. Each of the ships will have a capacity of 1,100 passengers and 276 cars and will be capable of reaching speeds of up to 38 knots (70 km/h; 44 mph). The new ships were named Bajamar Express and Bañaderos Express.

=== Barlovento Express ===
On the 28th November 2024, Fred. Olsen announced the addition of the Barlovento Express from Liberty Lines, to operate the Las Palmas-Morrojable line. It formerly operated for Trasmediterránea as Ciudad de Ceuta and Millenium Dos. It was built in 2003, construction 058 from Australian shipyard Incat.

=== Fleet table ===
| Name | Built | Builder | Tonnage | Specifications | Speed | Capacity | Route |
|---|---|---|---|---|---|---|---|
| Bencomo Express | 1999 | Incat hull 053 | 6,344 GT | 96 x 27 metres | 38 kn loaded, 47 kn light | 941 passengers, 260 cars | Santa Cruz de Tenerife - Agaete (Gran Canaria) |
| Bentago Express | 2000 | Incat hull 055 | 6,344 GT | 96 x 27 metres | 38 kn loaded, 47 kn light | 941 passengers, 260 cars | Santa Cruz de Tenerife - Agaete (Gran Canaria) |
| Bocayna Express | 2003 | Austal hull 196 | 2,527 GT | 66 x 19 metres | 31 kn loaded, 34 kn light | 436 passengers, 69 cars | Playa Blanca (Lanzarote) - Corralejo (Fuerteventura) |
| Benchijigua Express | 2005 | Austal hull 260 | 8,973 GT | 126 x 30 metres | 38 knots loaded | 1,291 pax, 340 cars | Los Cristianos (Tenerife) - San Sebastián de La Gomera - Santa Cruz de La Palma |
| Benchi Express | 2017 | Drassanes Dalmau | 283 GT | 29 x 9 metres | 20 knots loaded | 250 passengers. | Local transport on south coast of La Gomera |
| Betancuria Express | 2011 | Austal hull 246 | 10,371 GT | 113 x 27 metres | 40 knots | 1,400 pax, 357 cars | Las Palmas de Gran Canaria - Morro Jable (Fuerteventura) |
| Bajamar Express | 2020 | Austal hull 394 | 7,915 GT | 118 metres | 38 knots | 1,100 pax, 276 cars | Santa Cruz de Tenerife - Puerto de las Nieves (Agaete, Gran Canaria) |
| Bañaderos Express | 2021 | Austal | 7,915 GT | 118 metres | 38 knots | 1,100 pax, 276 cars | Santa Cruz de Tenerife - Puerto de las Nieves (Agaete, Gran Canaria) |
| Barlovento Express | 2003 | Incat Tasmania | GT | 97.22x26.60 metres | 38 knots | 900 pax, 267 cars | Las Palmas de Gran Canaria - Morro Jable |

== Lineas Fred. Olsen ==
The following ships have operated previously for Fred Olsen Express.

- HSC Bonanza Express
- HSC Benchi Express
- Ferry Betancuria
- Ferry Buganvilla
- Ferry Barlovento
- Ferry Betancuria
- Ferry Benchijigua
- Ferry Gomera
- Bahia Express

The company had many old slow ferries, but decided to revamp in 2000. This meant that most of the old ferries were sold on, being replaced by High Speed Catamarans and a new High Speed Trimaran.

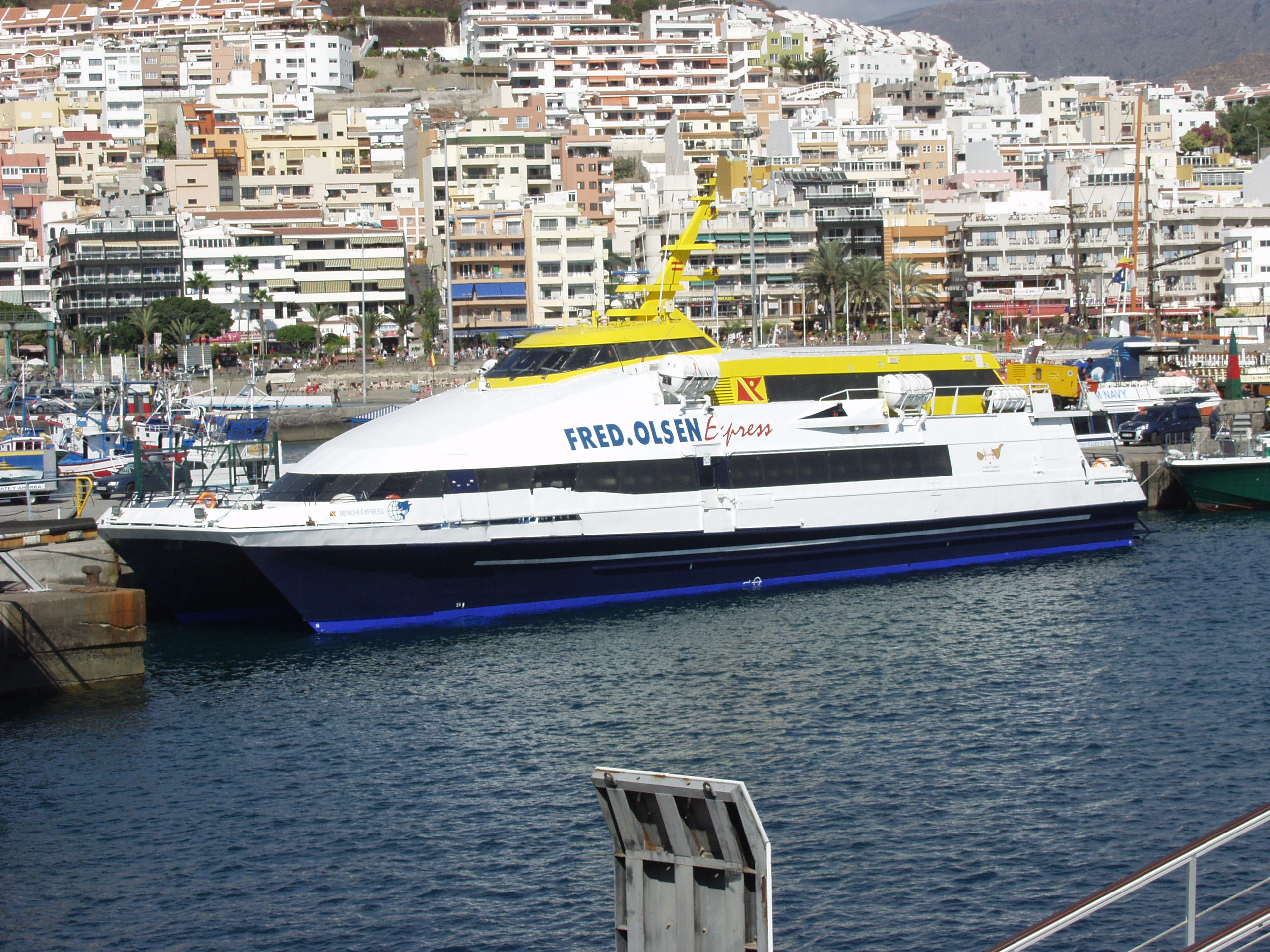
Benchi Express

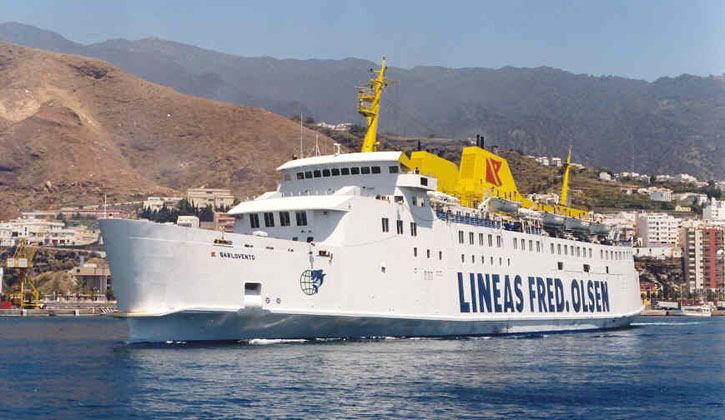
Ferry Barlovento

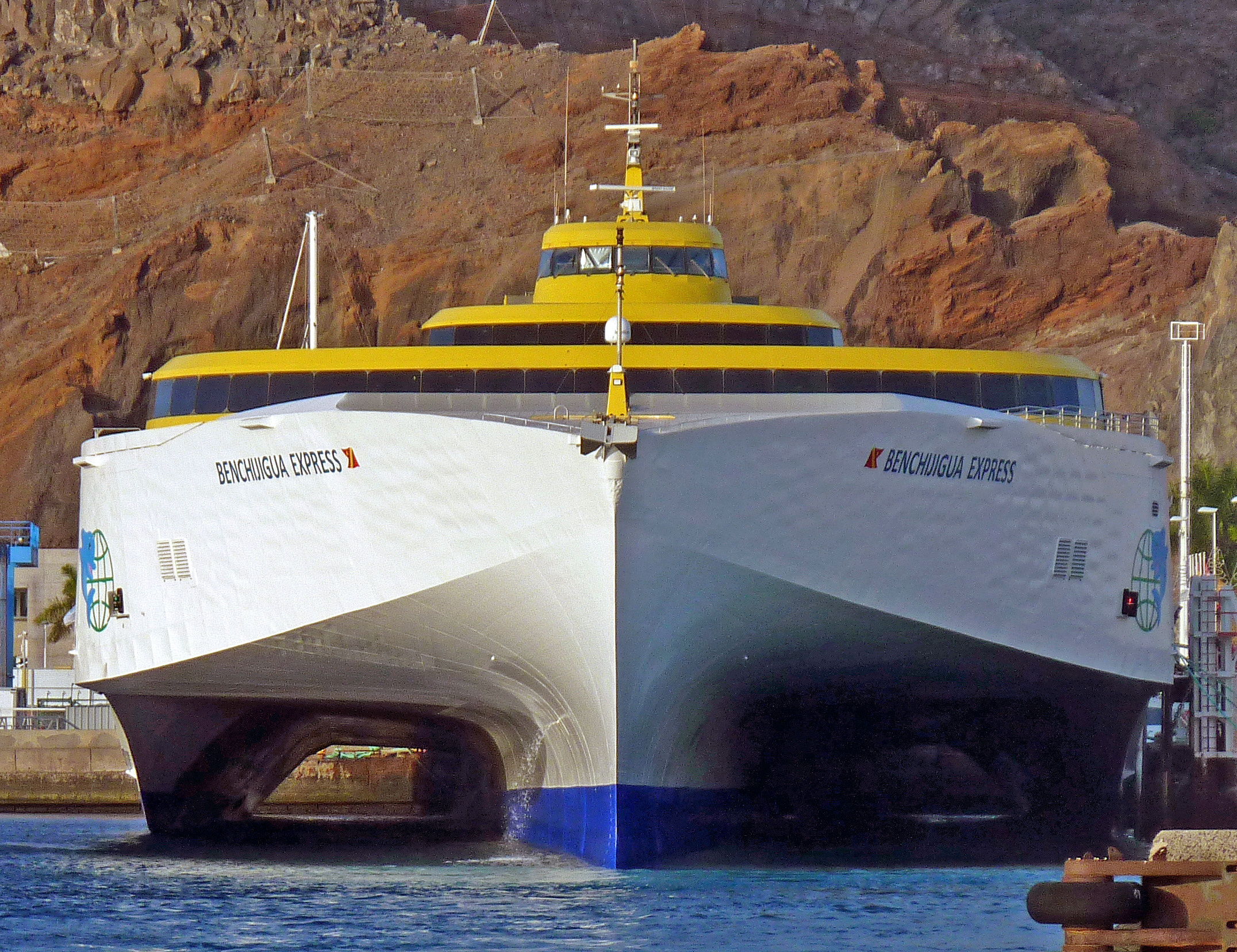
Benchijigua Express

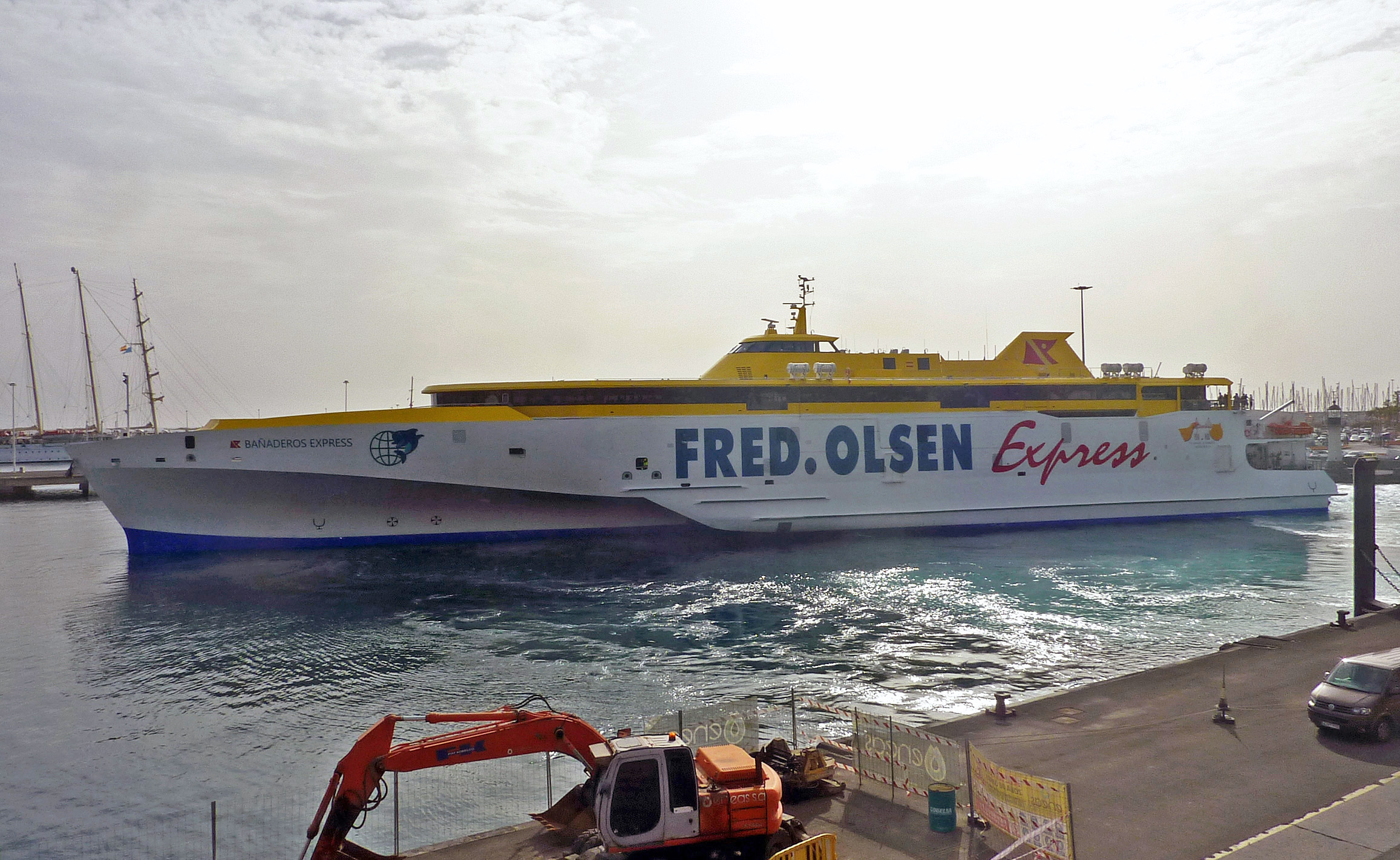
Banaderos Express

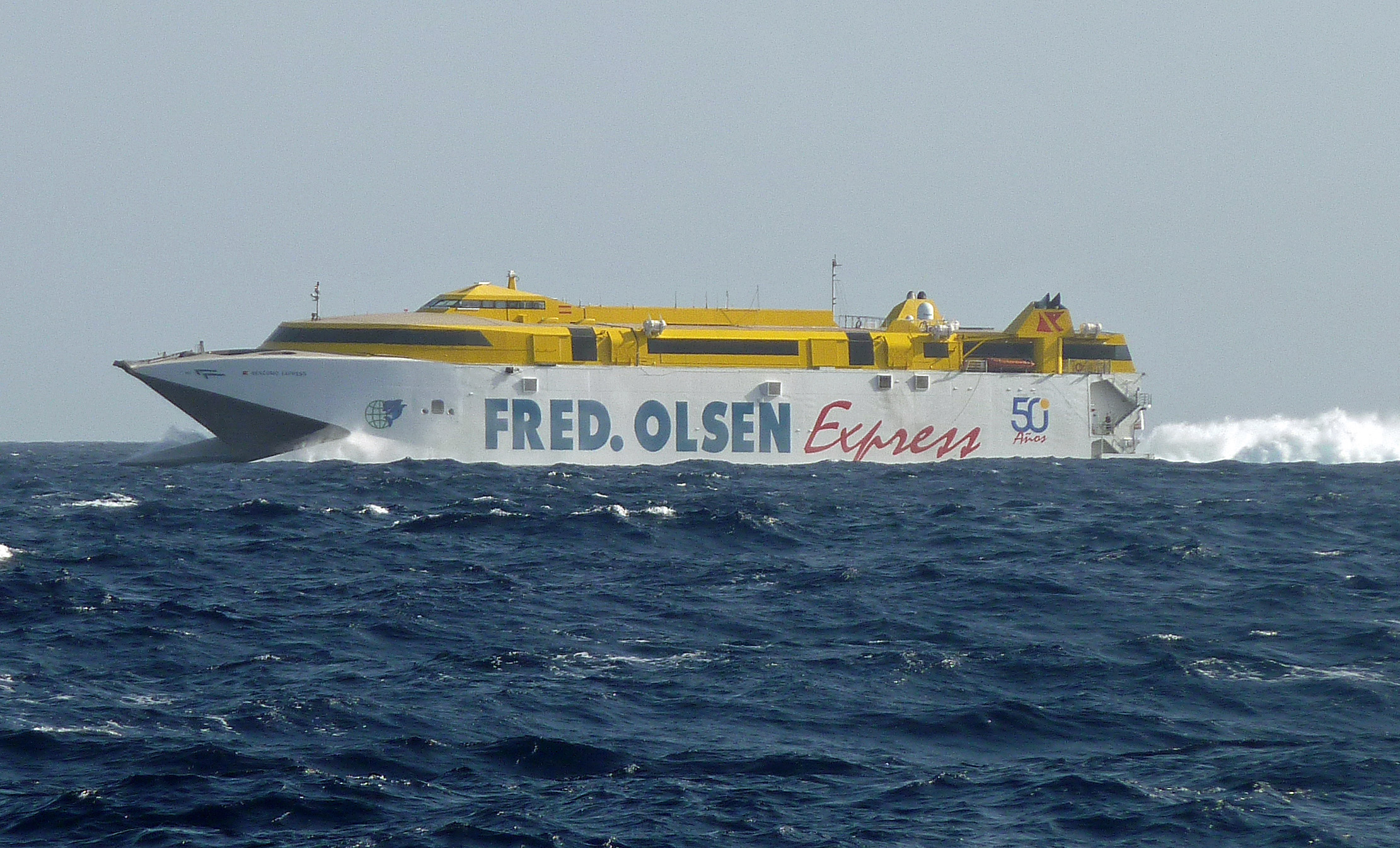
Bencomo Express

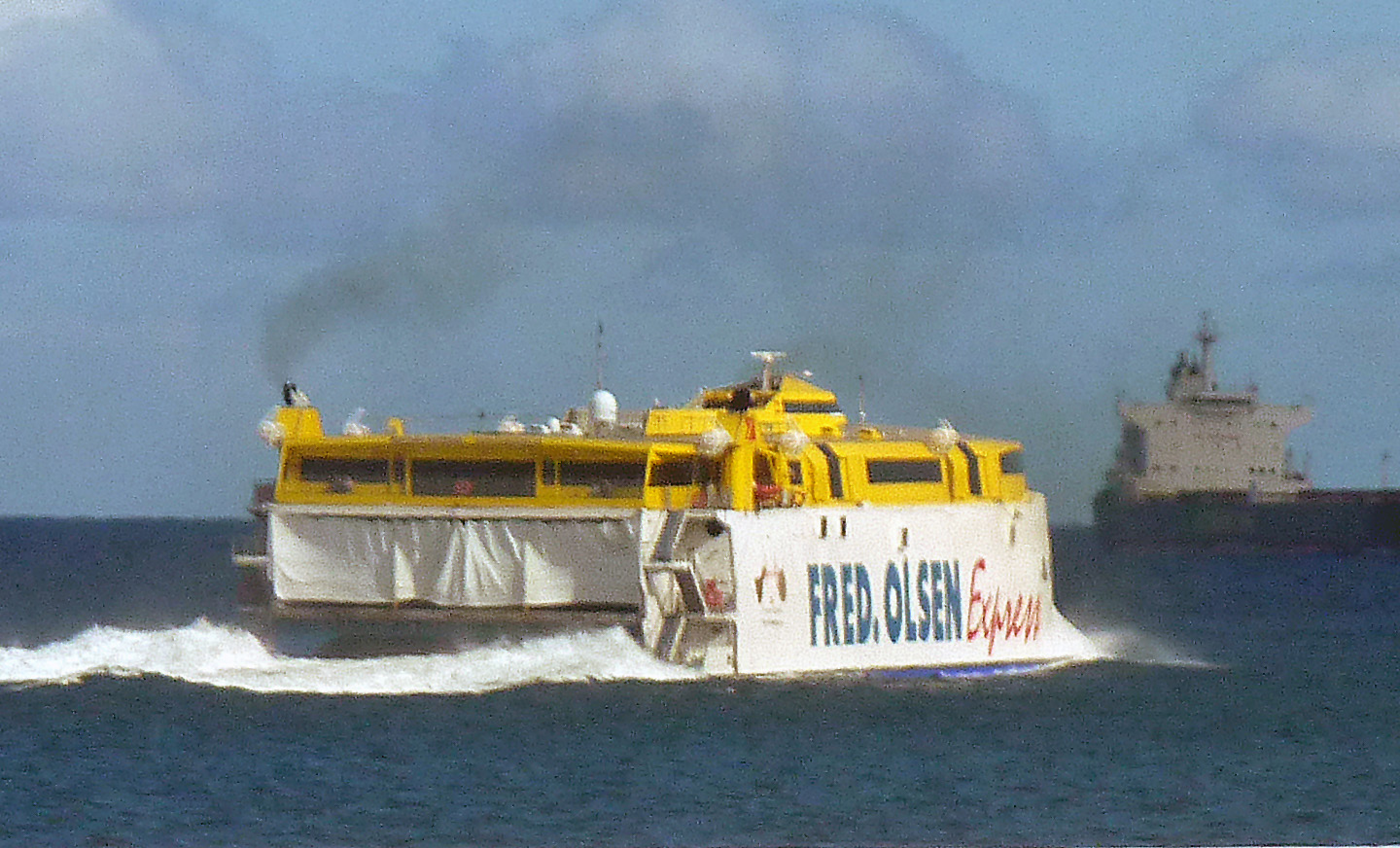
Bentago Express

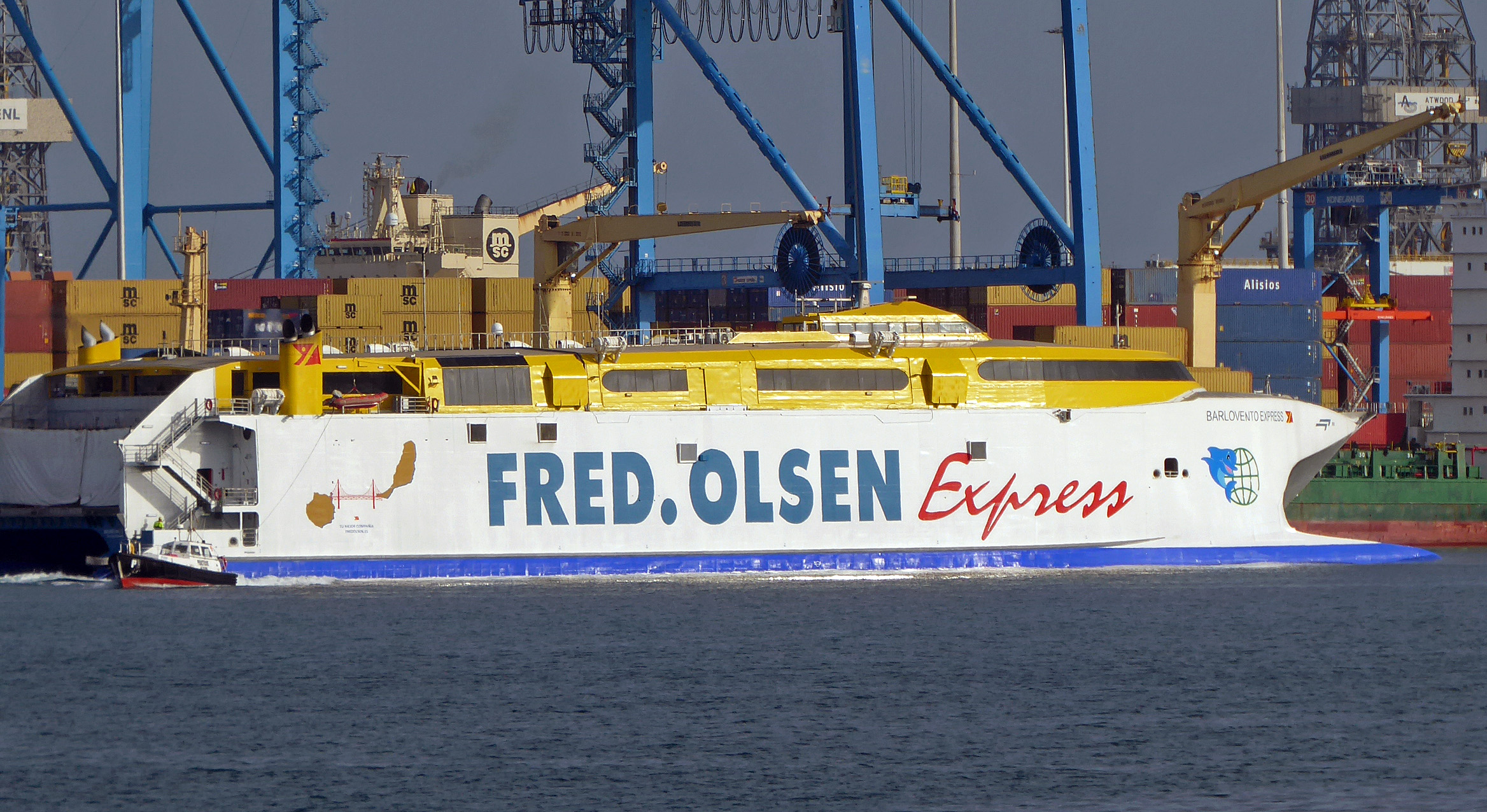
Barlovento Express

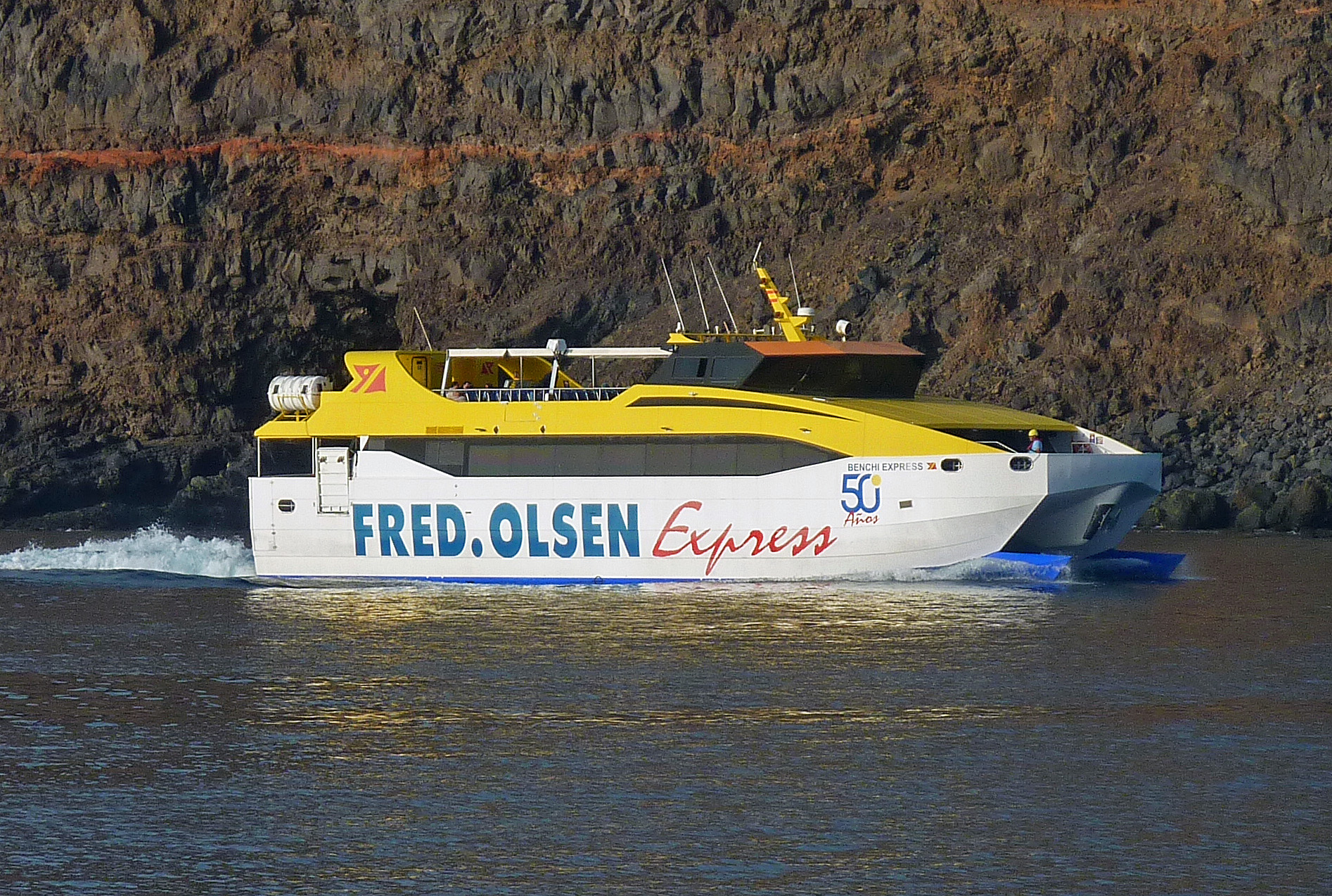
Benchi Express (2017)

== Incidents and accidents ==
The Bonanza Express ran aground in early December 2008. All 175 passengers were evacuated safely. It lost control when entering the port of Los Cristianos. The ship suffered substantial damage, but was not in danger of sinking, Fred Olsen general director Juan Ramsden said. The reason for the accident appeared to be linked to a failure of the ferry's reverse system, according to Ramsden. The ferry leaked up to three tons of fuel. The presence of cars on the deck slowed down attempts to take it to a shipyard for repairs. The Bonanza Express was planned to be in operation with Euroferries on a route between Ramsgate and Boulogne. However, although this service from Ramsgate to Boulogne was still due to start on 1 March 2010 after many delays, the Bonanza Express is now back with Fred Olsen, having been seen on the Los Cristianos webcam.

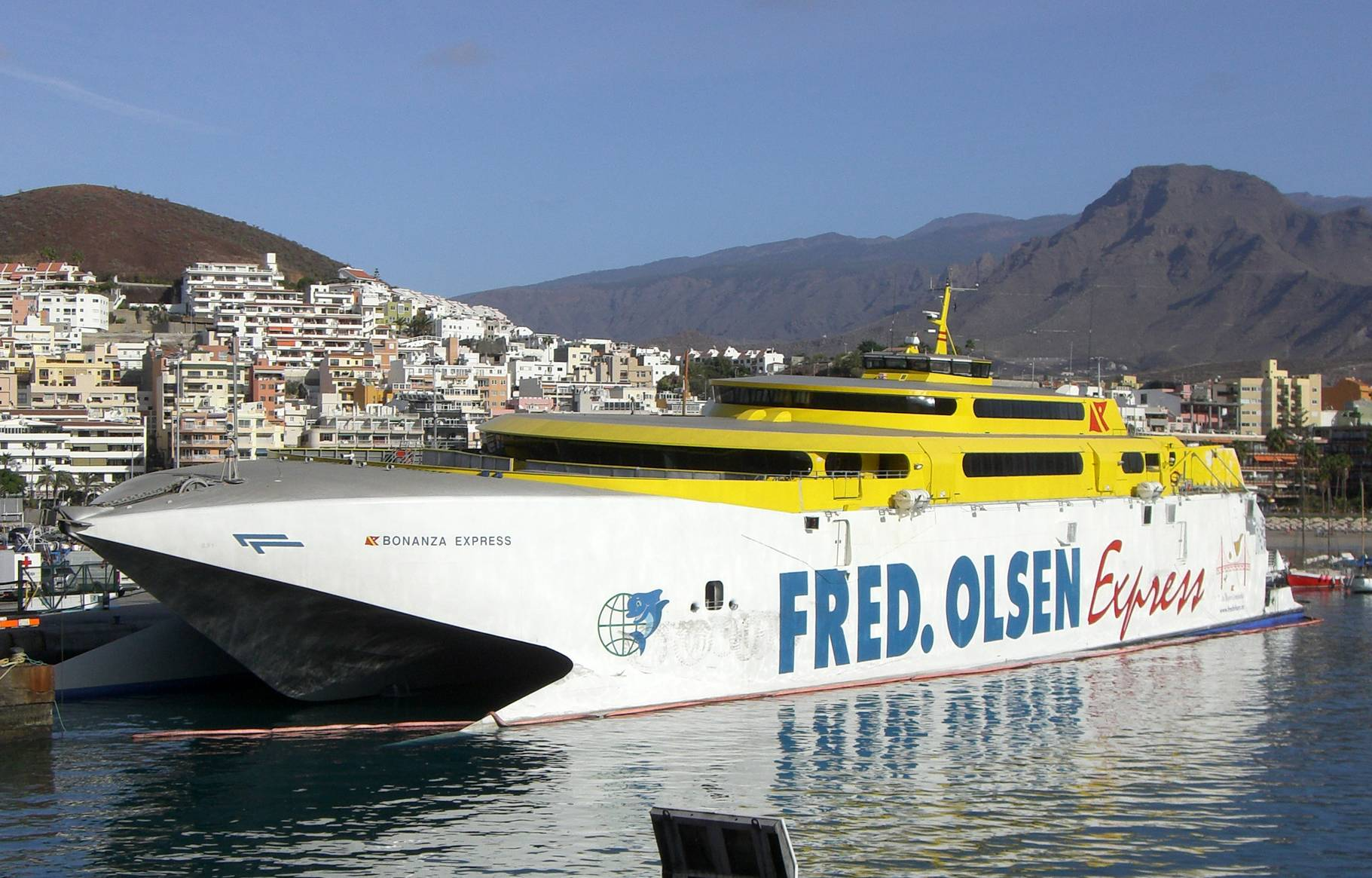
Bonanza Express after running aground in 2008.
