= Alajeró =

- Municipality
- Flag Coat of arms

- Location of Alajeró on La Gomera

- Location in the Canary Islands Alajeró (Spain, Canary Islands)
- Coordinates: 28°03′0″N 17°13′0″W
- Country: Spain
- Autonomous community: Canary Islands
- Province: Santa Cruz de Tenerife
- Island: La Gomera

Area
  - Total: 49.43 km^{2} (19.09 sq mi)
- Elevation: 810 m (2,660 ft)

Population (2025-01-01)
  - Total: 2,061
  - Density: 41.70/km^{2} (108.0/sq mi)
- Postal code: E-38812
- Climate: Csb

Alajeró is a municipality on the island of La Gomera in the province of Santa Cruz de Tenerife in the Canary Islands. It is located on the south coast, SW of the capital San Sebastián de la Gomera. As well as being a municipality, Alajeró is also the name of the administrative town that governs that municipality.

The valleys (barrancos) and Atlantic coastal strip are used for arable farming, with mountains and hills in the north covered by forest and scrub/grassland used for grazing sheep and goats.

== History ==
Historically the area of Alajeró was in areas known as Hipalán and Orone. On the (southern) coastal side of Alajeró, Playa Santiago, part of which is located within the Alajeró municipality, was founded by fishermen, attracted to the location by its excellent fishing opportunities. As a result of this canneries and ship repair facilities were established.

== Economy ==
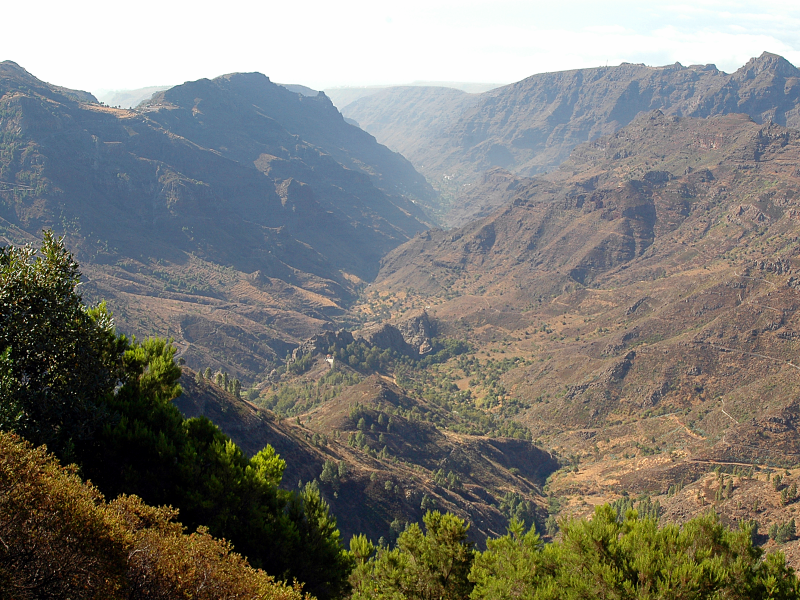
Alajeró valley

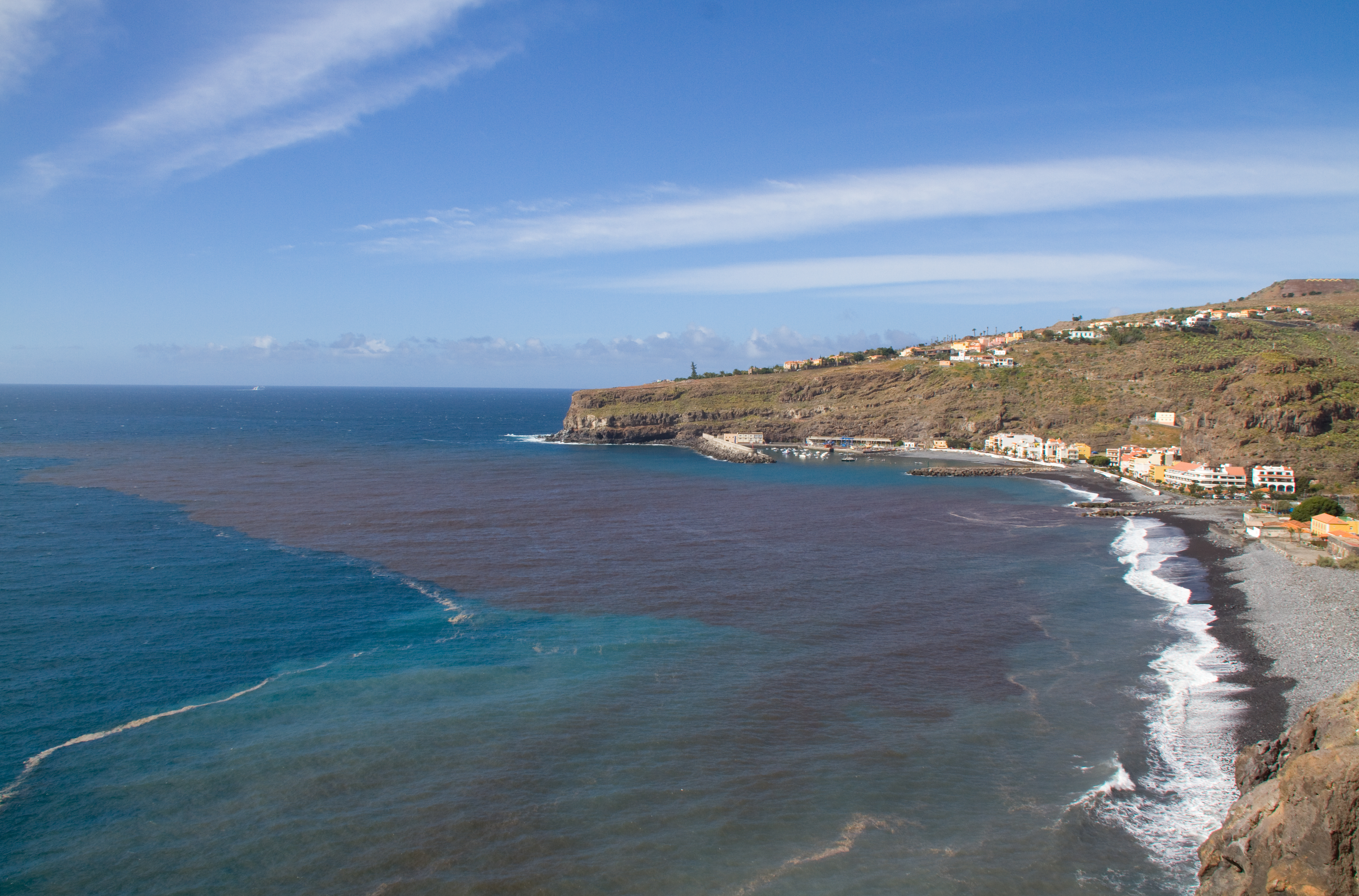
Playa de Santiago

Although hot during the summer, in the winter months the climate is generally foggy, particularly at higher altitudes, which the inhabitants take advantage of by planting crops in November and harvesting their fruit and vegetables in May. Agricultural production has fallen over the past few decades, with an agricultural crisis in the 1960s and the 1970s, causing many people to leave, so the smaller villages became depopulated.

The fish factory in Playa Santiago, which used to can tuna and sardines, shut down as fish stocks dwindled, although there are still a few remaining fishing boats, whose catch is frozen for transport. There is a boat repair yard in the port, but there is no longer a ferry. The Garajonay Exprės ferry ran from Valle Gran Rey via Santiago to San Sebastián de la Gomera and on to Los Cristianos, from 2002 to 2008, but ceased due to a lack of government subsidy.

La Gomera Airport (IATA: GMZ, ICAO: GCGM) lies between Alajeró and Santiago. Tourism is not as important in La Gomera as on the larger Canary Islands, but Playa Santiago has a fairly safe sand and shingle beach, and a number of apartments, rooms and restaurants. Rural tourism is also promoted with a new hotel at Alajeró town and Casas Rurales (rural houses) in the villages. The island attracts many hill walkers and has numerous way-marked footpaths.

The town of Santiago is split between two municipalities, Alajero and San Sebastian, but dominates the municipality of Alajero with about half the population (989/1954 in 2005). The town of Alajeró, which has the Ayuntamiento (municipal offices), is about 4.5 km inland at 812 m above sea level,

== Subdivisions or settlements ==
- Agalán
- Alajeró
- Antoncojo
- Arguayoda
- Benchijigua
- Erese
- Lo del Gato
- Imada de Tecina (2005 pop: 152)
- Magana
- part of Playa Santiago (2005 pop: 989) - a fishing port and tourist town
- Quise
- Targa

== Historical population ==
Year	Population
1930	2,132
1940	2,490
1950	2,631
1960	2,288
1970	1,718
1981	1,212
1990	1,143
1995	1,224
2000	1,343
2005	1,954
2006	2,054
2007	2,142
2018	2,006

== Sites of interest ==
- Ermita San Isidro on the peak called Roque Calvario (807 m) offers a panoramic view of the southwestern coast of the island of La Gomera
- A famous dracaena the Drago de Agalán, is found North of Alajeró town
- The Pastrana water mill
- Monumento Natural de La Caldera

== See also ==
- List of municipalities in Santa Cruz de Tenerife
