= Bentago Express =

Incat HSC catamaran

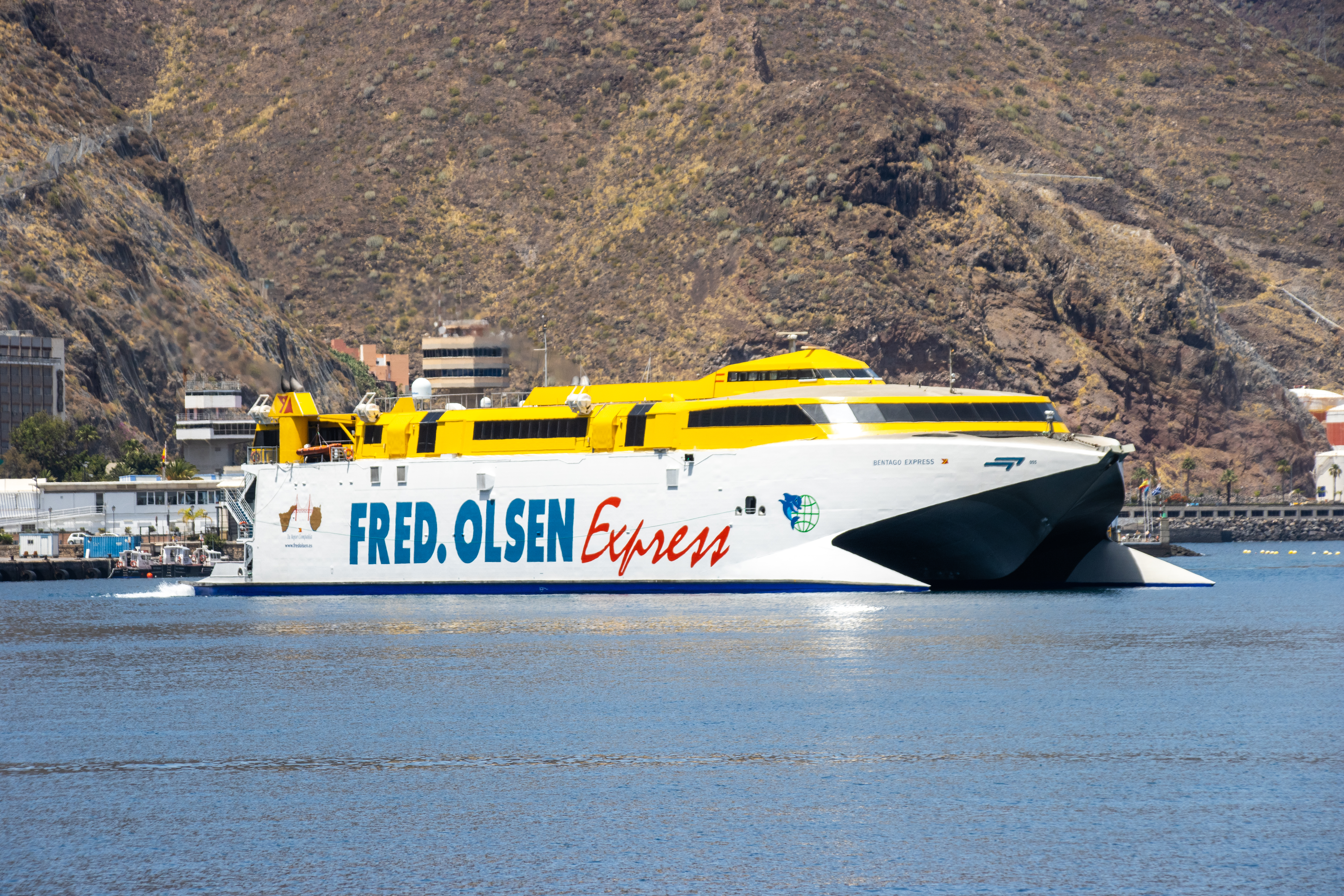
- Bentago Express in Santa Cruz de Tenerife

History
- Name: (2000–2004): Benchijigua Express; (2004–present): Bentago Express
- Owner: Fred. Olsen Express (Canaria de Buques Rápidos)
- Operator: Fred. Olsen Express
- Port of registry: Santa Cruz de Tenerife, Spain
- Route: Las Palmas – Morro Jable (until Dec 2024); Los Cristianos – Valverde (El Hierro) (Dec 2024–present)
- Builder: Incat Australia Pte Ltd.; Hobart, Tasmania, Australia
- Yard number: 55
- Launched: 2000
- Completed: 2000
- Acquired: 2000
- Maiden voyage: 2000
- In service: 2000
- Identification: IMO number: 9213337; Call sign: EFXS; MMSI number: 224756000
- Status: In service

General characteristics
- Class & type: Incat 96m Wave Piercing Catamaran
- Tonnage: 6,348 GT; 665 DWT
- Length: 95.47 m (313 ft 3 in)
- Beam: 26.16 m (85 ft 10 in)
- Draft: 3.20 m (10 ft 6 in)
- Installed power: 4 × Caterpillar 3618 diesel engines
- Propulsion: 4 × Lips waterjets
- Speed: 38.0 knots (70.4 km/h; 43.7 mph) (service) 40.0 knots (74.1 km/h; 46.0 mph) (max)
- Capacity: 880 passengers; 230 cars
- Notes: Sister ship to Bencomo Express.

Bentago Express is a high-speed vehicle and passenger roll-on/roll-off ferry built in 2000 by the Australian shipyard Incat. Initially entering service as the Benchijigua Express, she was renamed Bentago Express in 2004. The ship is a twin sister to another long-standing member of the Fred. Olsen fleet, the Bencomo Express.

== Service ==
The catamaran, the fifth of a series of six sister units, was launched on 20 December 1999 at the Incat, Hobart with the name Benchijigua Express and delivered on 6 January 2000 to Fred. Olsen Express, for which she entered service on 28 January on the routes between Los Cristianos and San Sebastián de la Gomera.

In November 2004, in view of the entry into service of the new Benchijigua Express, which was to be joined on the route, it was renamed Bentago Express. In 2008 it was then transferred to the connections between Santa Cruz de Tenerife and Agaete.

On January 7, 2021, it ran aground during maneuvers to enter Agaete due to bad weather. However, the incident created a leak in the hull, and the catamaran was promptly evacuated.After a week, on January 14, the Bentago Express was refloated and towed to Agaete, where the vehicles in the garage were unloaded. It was subsequently transferred to Las Palmas de Gran Canaria and repaired.

== Sister ships ==
- Manannan
- Giga Jet
- Volcan de Teno
- Villa de Agaete
- Bencomo Express
