= Bocayna Express =

High-speed catamaran

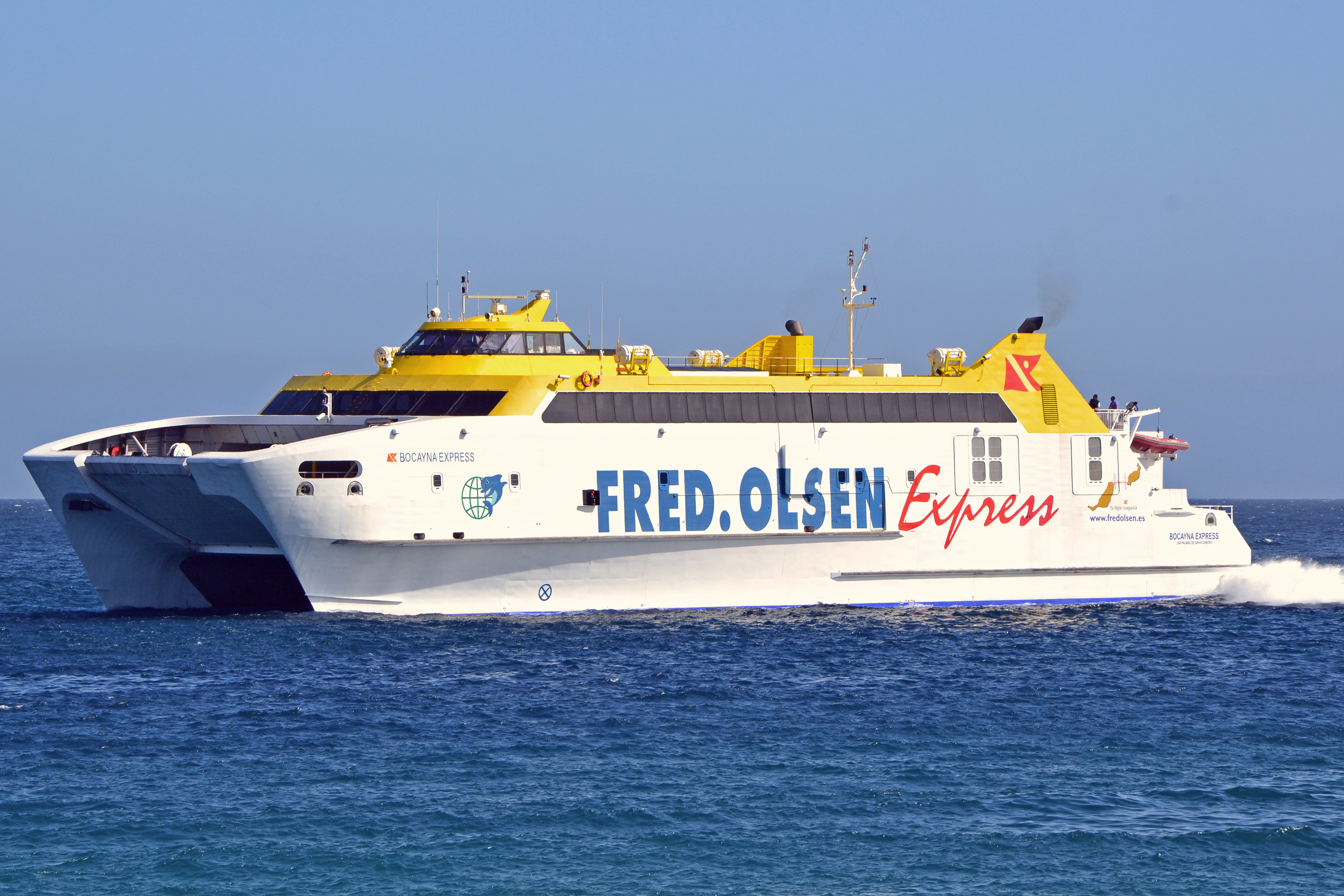
- Bocayna Express

History

Spain
- Name: Bocayna Express
- Owner: Fred. Olsen Express
- Operator: Fred. Olsen Express
- Port of registry: Las Palmas de Gran Canaria
- Route: Playa Blanca - Corralejo
- Builder: Austal
- Yard number: 196
- Laid down: 3 February 2003
- Launched: 12 July 2003
- Completed: 7 September 2003
- Identification: Call sign: ECEA; IMO number: 9285378; MMSI number: 224197000; DNV ID: 24733
- Status: In service
- Notes: Car ferry / catamaran

General characteristics
- Tonnage: 2,527 GT
- Length: 66.2 m (217.2 ft)
- Beam: 18.65 m (61.2 ft)
- Draught: 2.45 m (8 ft 0 in)
- Decks: 2
- Installed power: 2 MAN Paxman 18VP185 + 2 MAN Paxman 12VP185, 11,600 kW (15,600 hp) in total
- Propulsion: 2 Rolls-Royce Kamewa 90 SII + 2 Rolls-Royce Kamewa 80 SII waterjets
- Speed: 31 kn (57 km/h; 36 mph)
- Capacity: 436 passengers; 69 cars
- Crew: 11

Bocayna Express is a catamaran fast ferry operated by Fred. Olsen Express between the Canary Islands of Fuerteventura and Lanzarote in the Atlantic Ocean. It was delivered to Fred. Olsen in September 2003 and has been operating the route between the towns of Corralejo (Fuerteventura) and Playa Blanca (Lanzarote) since then. The ship is named after the Bocayna strait which separates the two islands it serves.

== Design and construction ==
The Bocayna Express was built by Austal in Henderson, Western Australia. The vessel is 66.20 metres (217.2 ft) long, 18.65 metres (61.2 ft) wide, and has a draught of 2.45 metres (8 ft 0 in). It can reach speeds of 31 knots (57 km/h; 36 mph).

The vessel is powered by four diesel engines (two MAN Paxman 18VP185s and two MAN Paxman 12VP185) capable of providing a combined power of 11,600 kilowatts (15,600 hp). The diesel engines drive four waterjet propellers: two Rolls-Royce Kamewa 90 SII and two Rolls-Royce Kamewa 80 SII. The electrical energy is generated by two MAN D2866LXE generator units.

The ship can transport up to 436 passengers. For vehicle transport there are 31 car spaces and 110 metres (360 ft) of truck lane; the latter can be converted into 38 additional car spaces.

== Predecessors ==
Fred. Olsen has been operating the same route between the ports of Playa Blanca and Corralejo since July 1989. The first vessel used by the company on this route was the Betancuria, a 56-metre (184 ft) long ship capable of transporting over 400 passengers at 14 knots (26 km/h; 16 mph). The Betancuria was later replaced by a larger ship, the Buganvilla, with a length of 64 metres (210 ft) and a capacity for 800 passengers. The Bocayna Express replaced the Buganvilla in 2003 and has been serving the route since then.

== See also ==
Ships covering the same route

- Volcán de Tindaya
