= Barlovento Express =

HSC owned by Fred. Olsen Express

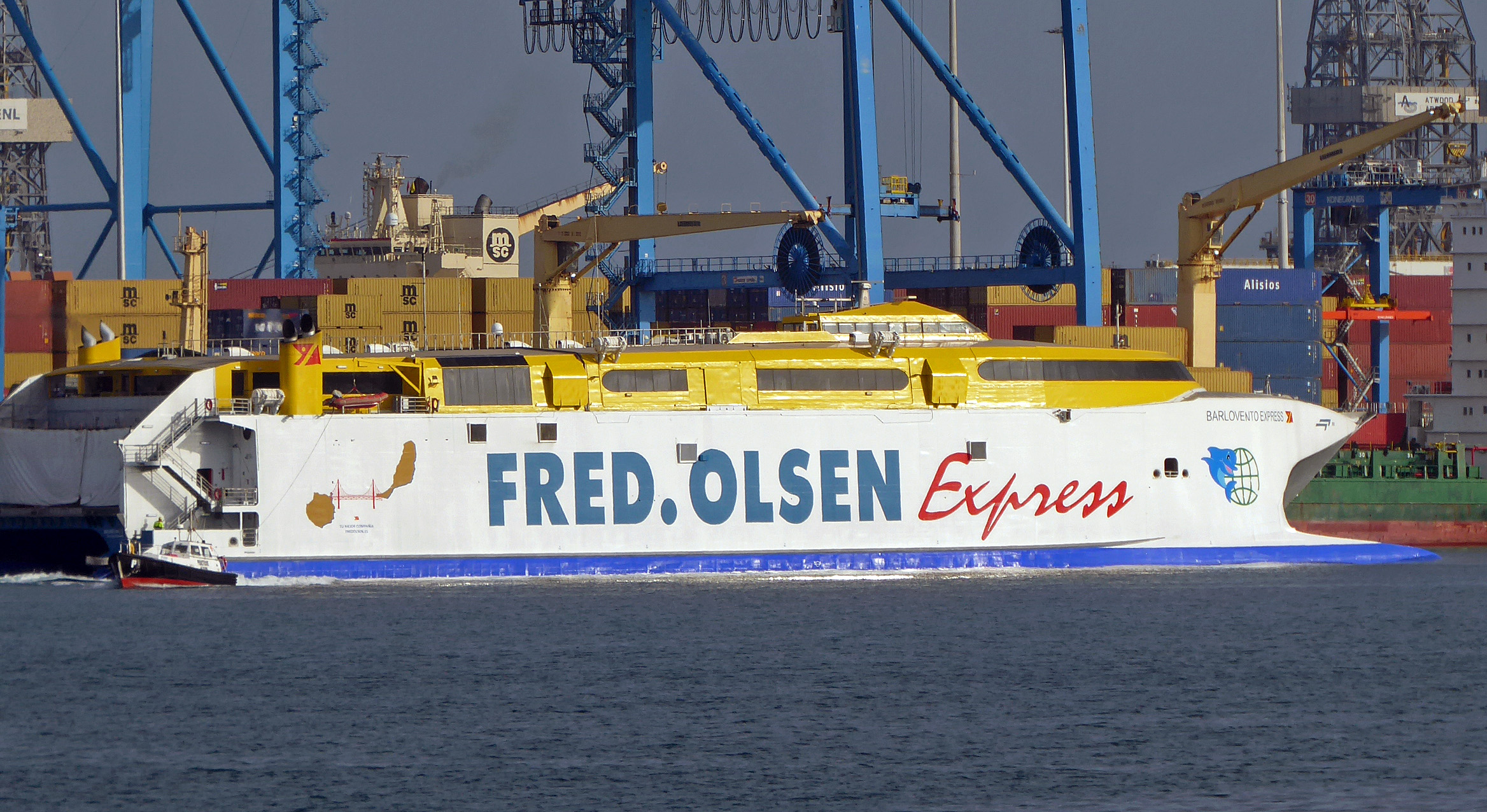
- Barlovento Express in Las Palmas

History
- Name: (2003): Incat 058; (2003–2019): Milenium Dos; (2019–2024): Ciudad de Ceuta; (2024): Vittorio M; (2024–present): Barlovento Express
- Owner: (2003–2005): Trasmediterránea; (2005–2018): Acciona Trasmediterránea; (2018–2024): Naviera Armas; (2024): Liberty Lines; (2024–present): Fred. Olsen, S.A.
- Operator: (2003–2018): Trasmediterránea / Acciona Trasmediterránea; (2018–2024): Naviera Armas; (2024): Liberty Lines; (2024–present): Fred. Olsen Express
- Port of registry: Santa Cruz de Tenerife, Spain
- Route: Las Palmas – Morro Jable
- Ordered: 2000
- Builder: Incat Tasmania; Hobart, Tasmania, Australia
- Yard number: 058
- Laid down: 1 March 2000
- Launched: 2003
- Completed: 30 April 2003
- Acquired: November 2024
- Maiden voyage: 2003
- In service: 2003
- Identification: IMO number: 9237644; Call sign: ECCX; MMSI number: 224239000
- Status: In service

General characteristics
- Class & type: Incat 98m wave-piercing catamaran
- Tonnage: 6,554 GT; 758 DWT
- Length: 97.20 m (318 ft 11 in)
- Beam: 26.65 m (87 ft 5 in)
- Draft: 3.45 m (11 ft 4 in)
- Decks: 3
- Ramps: Rear loading ramps
- Installed power: 4 × Ruston 20RK270 diesel engines (total 28,800 kW)
- Propulsion: 4 × Lips waterjets
- Speed: 35.0 knots (64.8 km/h; 40.3 mph) (service) 42.0 knots (77.8 km/h; 48.3 mph) (max)
- Capacity: 866 passengers; 220 cars
- Notes: Equipped with an active ride control system featuring transoms and T-foils.

Barlovento Express is a 98-metre high-speed wave-piercing catamaran ferry operated by Fred. Olsen Express. Built in Australia by Incat in 2003 (Hull 058), she spent most of her career as Milenium Dos (later Ciudad de Ceuta) for Trasmediterránea across the Strait of Gibraltar. Briefly acquired in late 2024 by Italy's Liberty Lines as Vittorio M, she was chartered and acquired by Fred. Olsen Express, re-registered in Santa Cruz de Tenerife, and renamed Barlovento Express to serve the Las Palmas–Fuerteventura route.

== Service ==
The catamaran, the second of a series of six sister units, was launched on 8 February 2001 at the Incat specialist shipyard in Hobart with the name Incat 058, corresponding to the construction number, and, after being completed, laid up in the Australian shipyard awaiting buyers, who arrived on 30 April 2003, when she was purchased by the Spanish company Trasmediterránea and renamed Milenium Dos. Following this, on 6 May the catamaran sailed from Tasmania to Barcelona, where she arrived on 4 June, finally entering service on 20 June on the routes between Valencia, Ibiza and Palma de Mallorca, replacing the Almudaina. In September 2004 it was transferred to the Canary Islands, where it replaced the Princesa Dácil on the routes between Las Palmas de Gran Canaria and Santa Cruz de Tenerife, where it operated for just two months, until 4 December, when the company decided to cancel the route and transfer the catamaran back to the Balearic Islands, where it operated until 2008, when it was transferred together with the rest of the fleet's high-speed vessels to the line between Algeciras and Ceuta, in the Alboran Sea. On 13 January 2012, while sailing in the Strait of Gibraltar, the catamaran was rammed by the freighter New Glory about five miles north of Ceuta, which caused a 26-metre-long and 6-metre-high gash in the starboard side of the Milenium Dos, causing damage to the car deck, decks 4, 5 and 6 and two fuel tanks, which spilled into the sea. The passenger deck fortunately suffered only minor damage and the catamaran managed to stay afloat. The following day the fast ferry was separated from the cargo ship and transferred under tow, first to Ceuta and, two days later, to Algeciras, before being dry-docked at the nearby GibDock shipyard in Gibraltar, where it was repaired. In June 2013, after more than a year of lay-up, the catamaran finally returned to service in the Strait of Gibraltar.

On 1 June 2019, during a stopover in the Cadiz shipyards, where it was completed refurbished, the catamaran was renamed Ciudad de Ceuta and repainted with the new livery of the Spanish company.At the end of the technical stopover it was then transferred to the Balearics, where it took service on the connections between Palma de Mallorca, Ibiza and Gandia, finally returning the following year to the Strait of Gibraltar.

In October 2024, after nineteen years of service for Trasmediterránea, the catamaran was sold to the Italian Liberty Lines, to which it was delivered on 28 November and renamed Vittorio M, but was immediately transferred on bareboat charter to the Spanish Fred. Olsen Express, by which it was in turn renamed Barlovento Express. Following this, on 30 November the catamaran was transferred from Algeciras to the Canary Islands,where on 31 December it began service on the connections between Los Cristianos and El Hierro. In January 2025 it was finally transferred to the connections between Las Palmas de Gran Canaria and Morro Jable.

== Sister ships ==
- Voyager
- Ift
- Hai Xia Hao
- T&T Spirit
- Volcan de Tirajana
