= Playa Santiago =

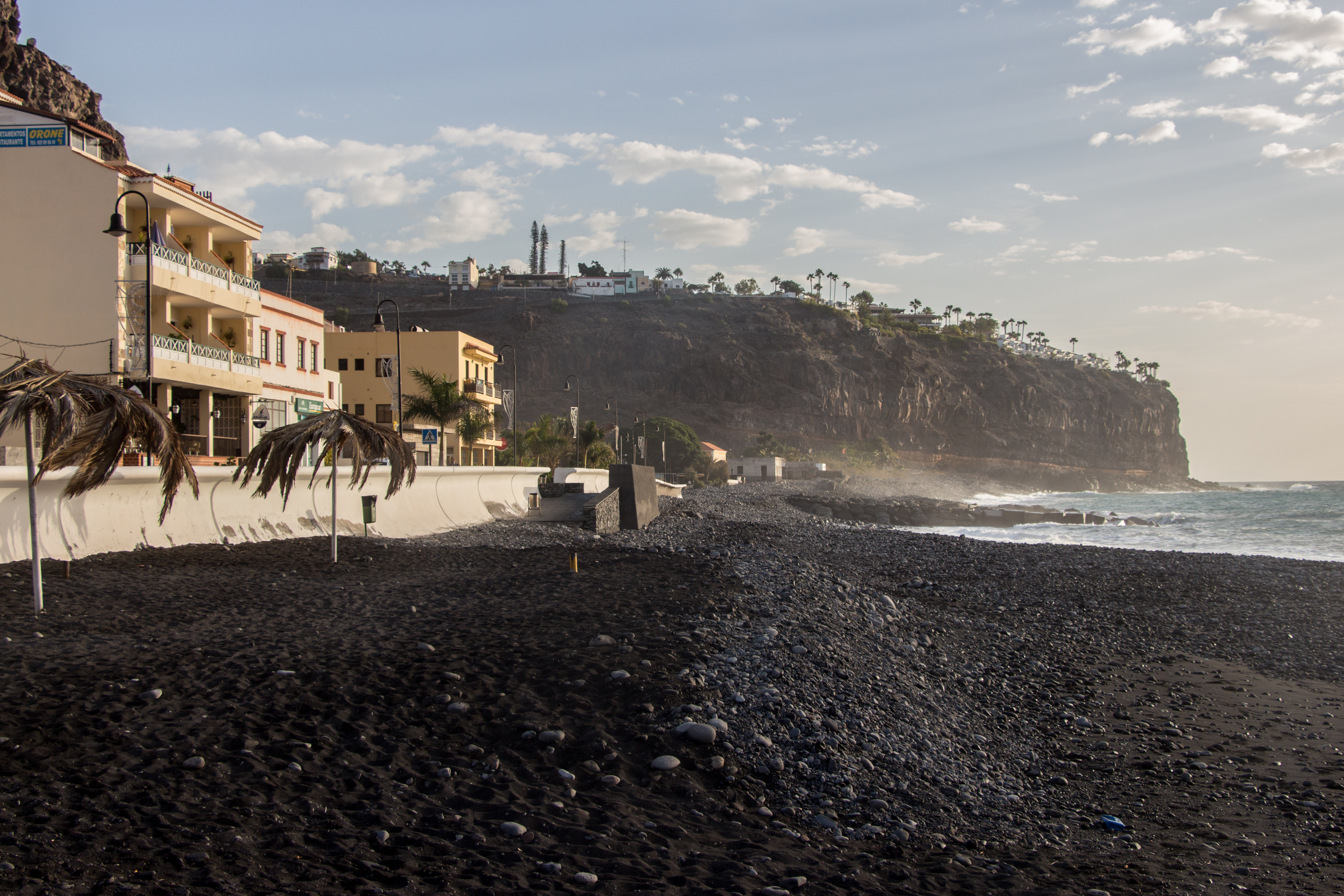
- Interactive map of Playa Santiago
- Coordinates: 28°01′45″N 17°11′48″W
- Country: Spain
- Autonomous community: Canary Islands
- Province: Santa Cruz de Tenerife
- Island: La Gomera
- Municipality: Alajeró

Population (2005)
  - Total: 989
- Postal code: E-38810

Playa Santiago (also known as Playa de Santiago) is a small town on the south coast of the island of La Gomera in the Canary Islands. It is split between two municipalities, Alajeró and San Sebastian. The part within the municipality of Alajero is the largest settlement in that municipality, with about half the population (989/1954 in 2005).

The fish factory in Playa Santiago, which used to can tuna and sardines, shut down as fish stocks dwindled, although there are still a few remaining fishing boats, whose catch is frozen for transport. There is a boat repair yard in the port, but there is no longer a ferry. The Garajonay Exprės ferry ran from Valle Gran Rey via Santiago to San Sebastián de la Gomera and on to Los Cristianos, from 2002 to 2008, but ceased due to a lack of government subsidy. A replacement ferry operated by Fred. Olsen, the Benchi Express, ceased operation in February 2012, but was replaced by a new ferry, also called the Benchi Express, in summer 2017.

La Gomera Airport (IATA: GMZ, ICAO: GCGM) lies 3 km from Santiago.

Playa Santiago has a fairly safe pebble beach, and a hotel and a number of apartments, rooms and restaurants.
