= Puerto de las Nieves =

- Hamn
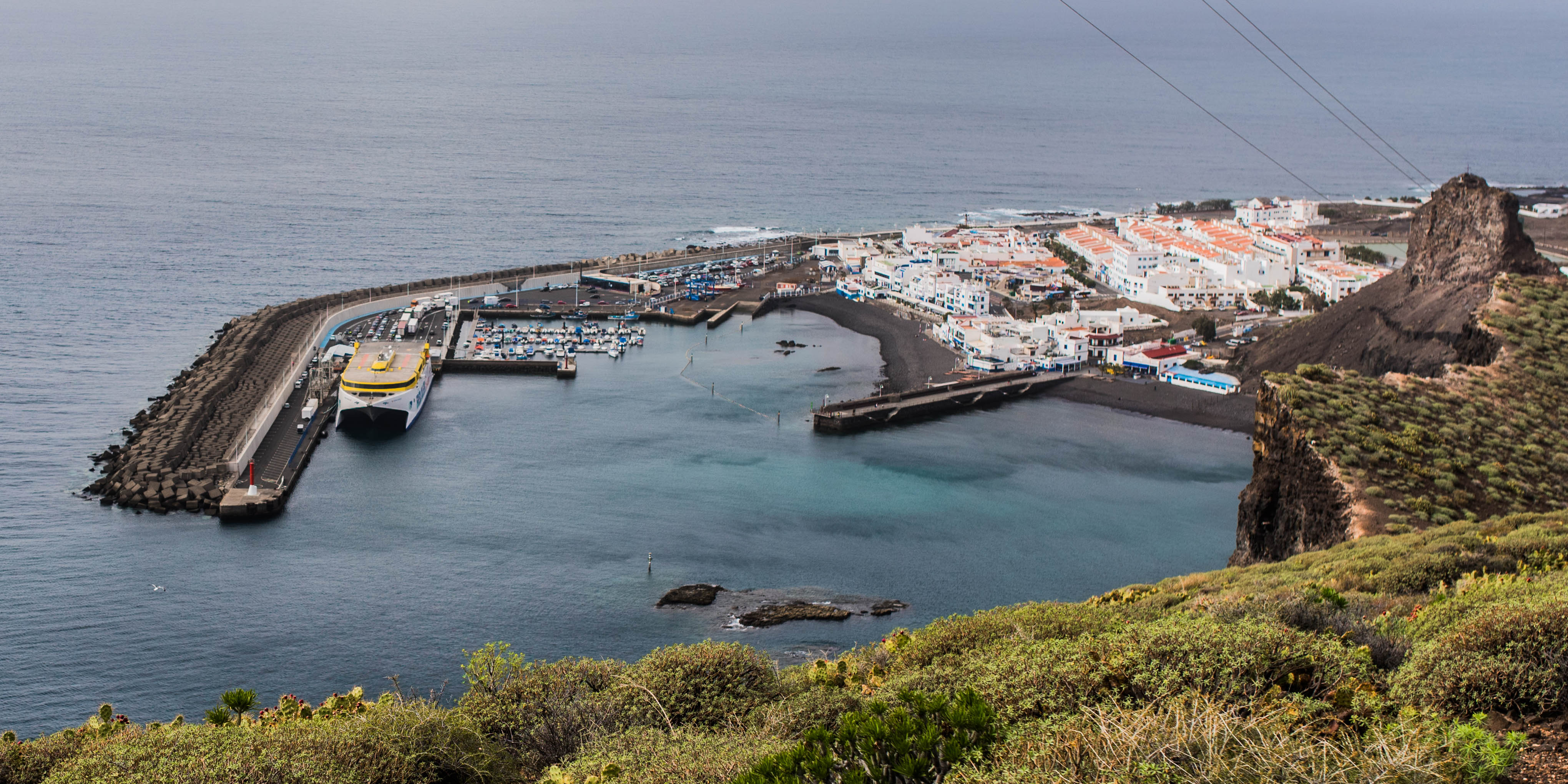
- Puerto de las Nieves

- Location within Atlantic Ocean
- Coordinates: 28°6′N 15°42.6′W
- Country: Spain
- Region: Canary Islands
- Province: Provincia de Las Palmas
  - Summer (DST): UTC+1

Puerto de las Nieves is a fishing village on the north-western coast of Gran Canaria, and the port of the town Agaete at a few kilometres' distance.

Ferries leave five times a day for Santa Cruz de Tenerife. The crossing takes 80 minutes with catamarans.

== Gallery ==
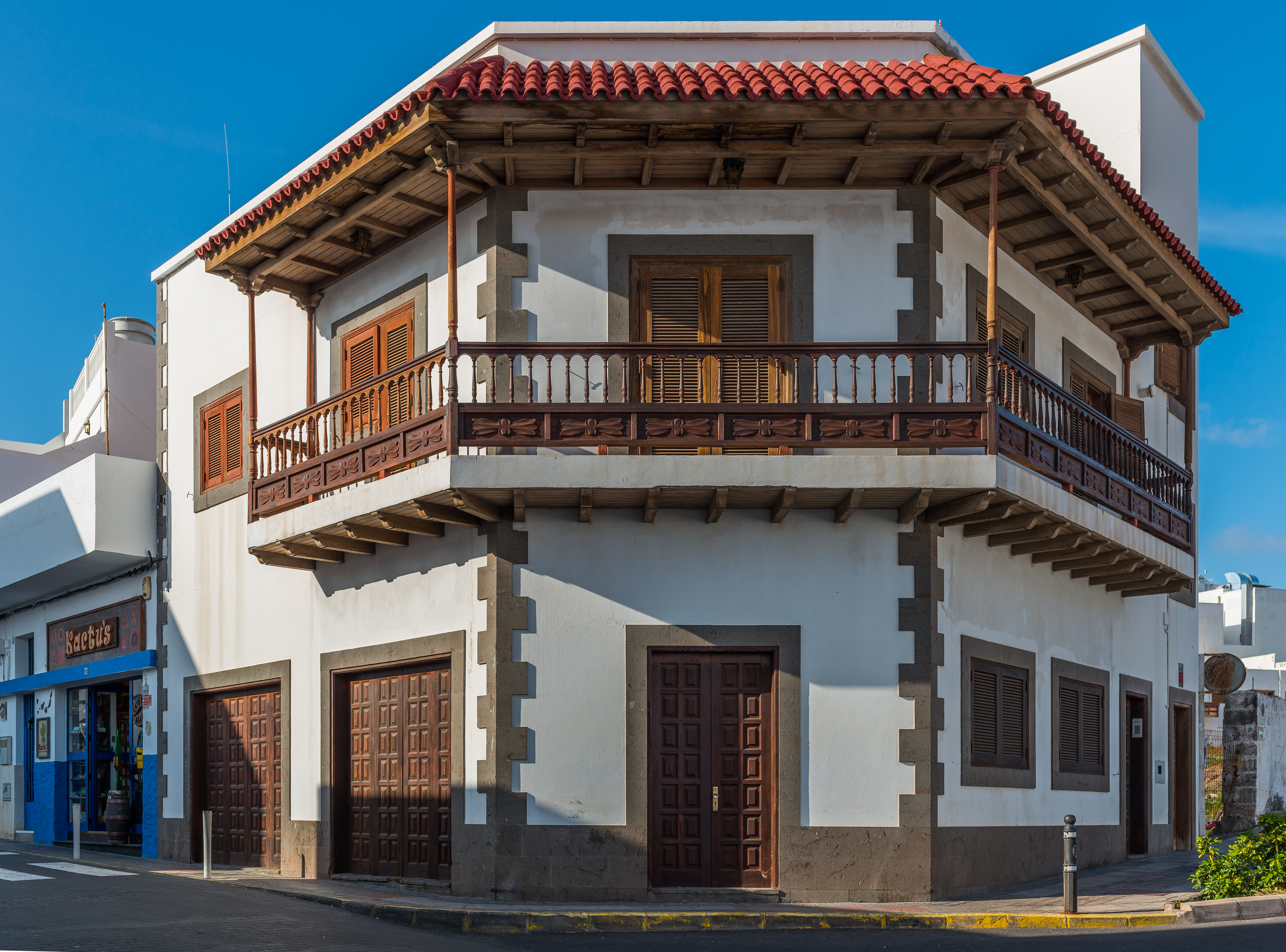

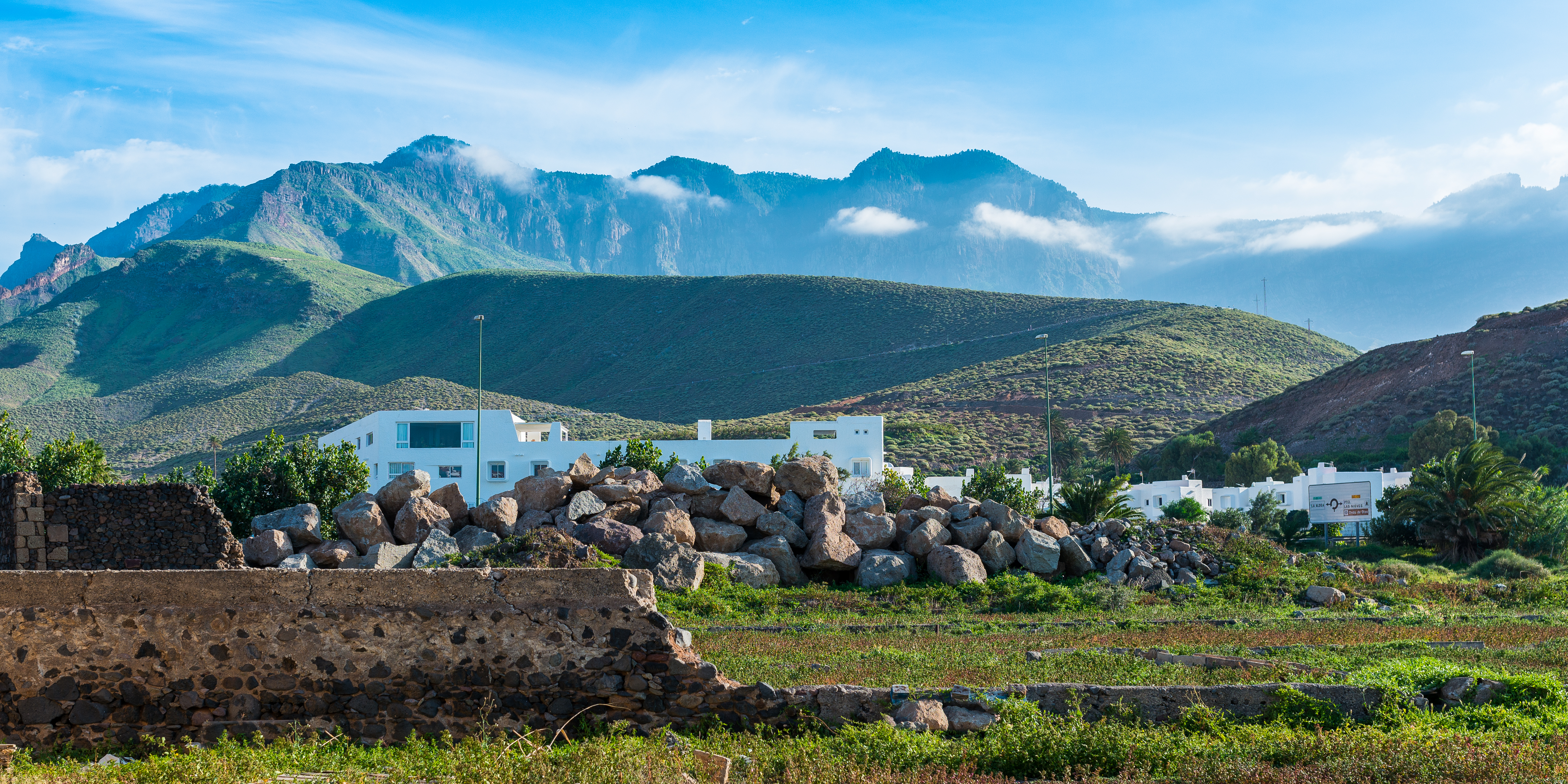

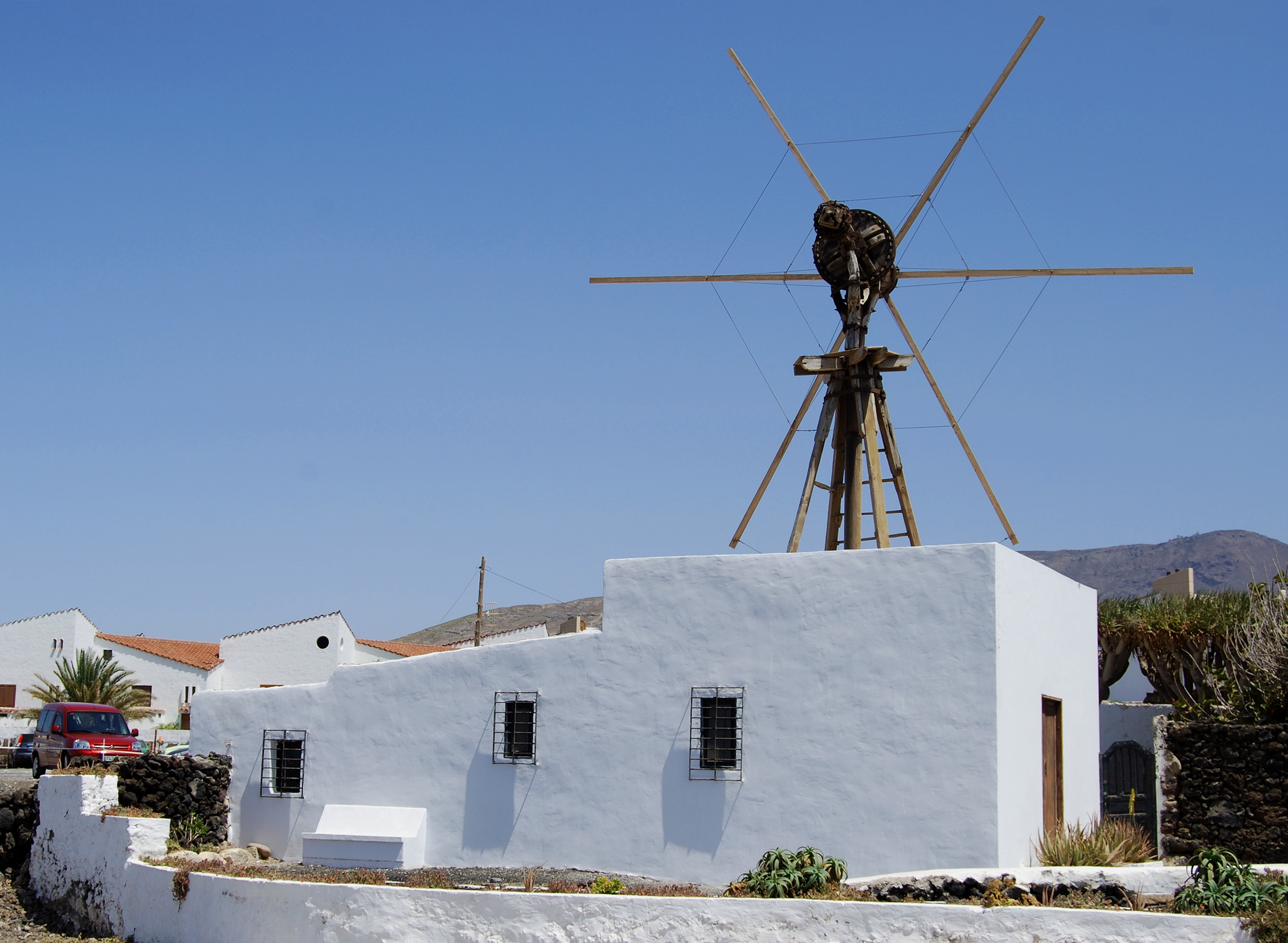

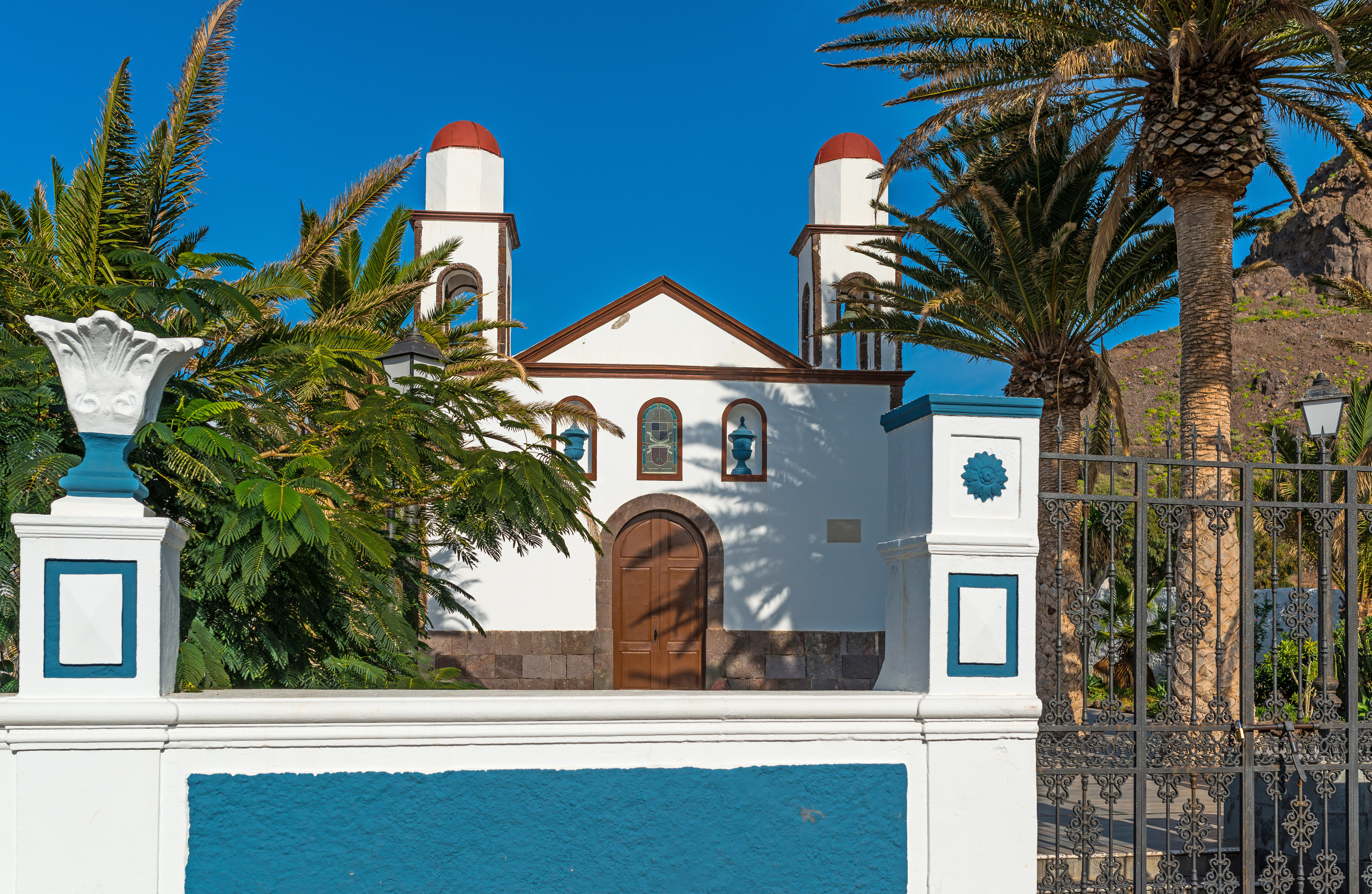

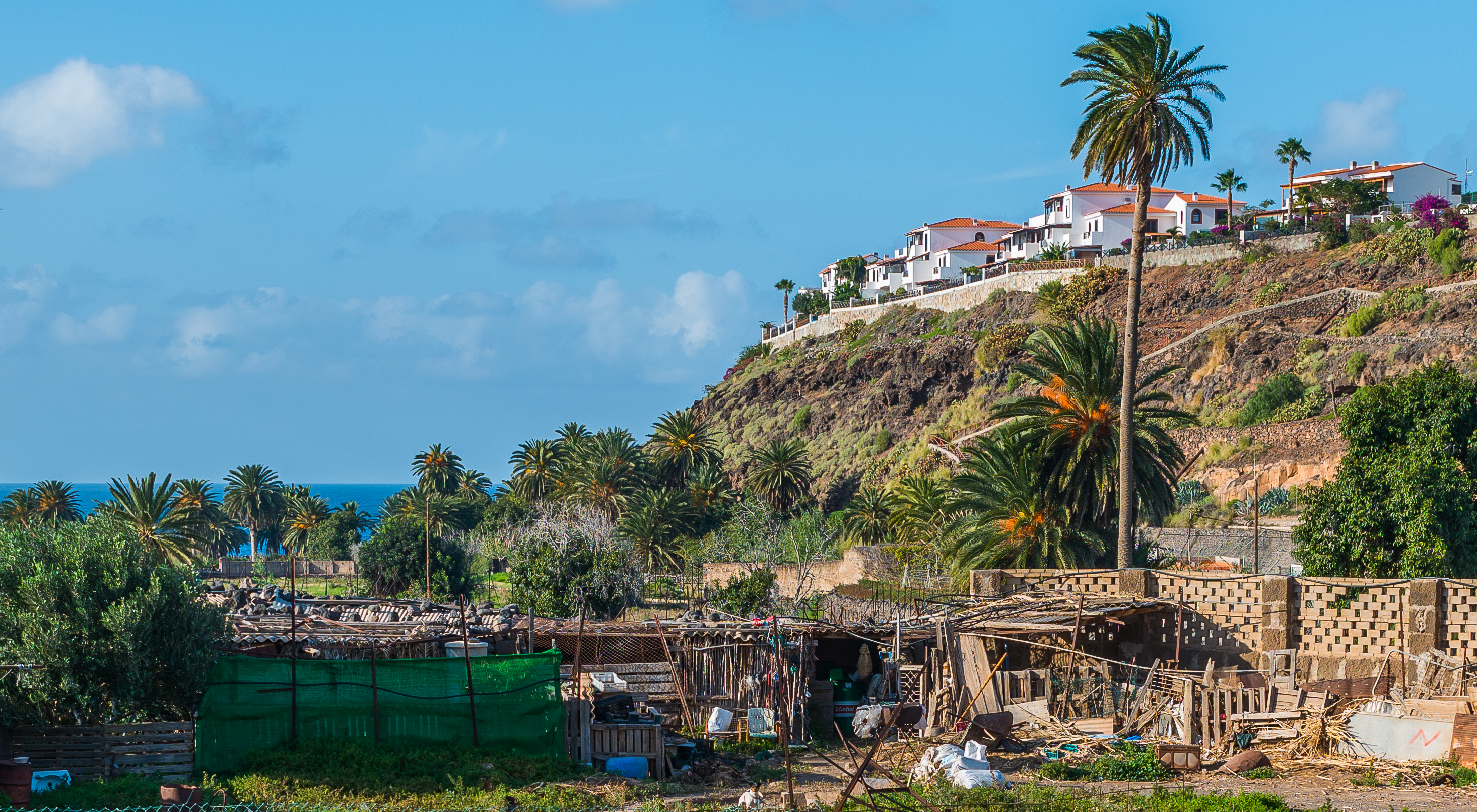
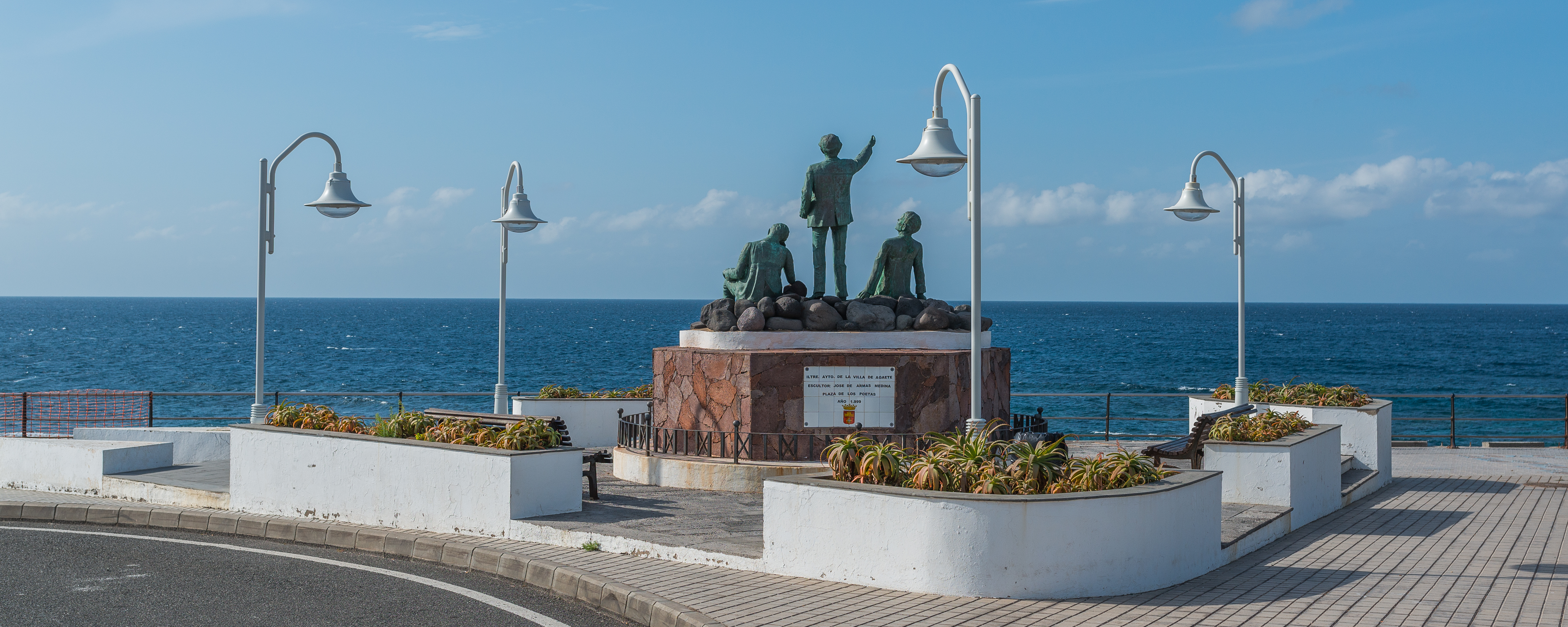

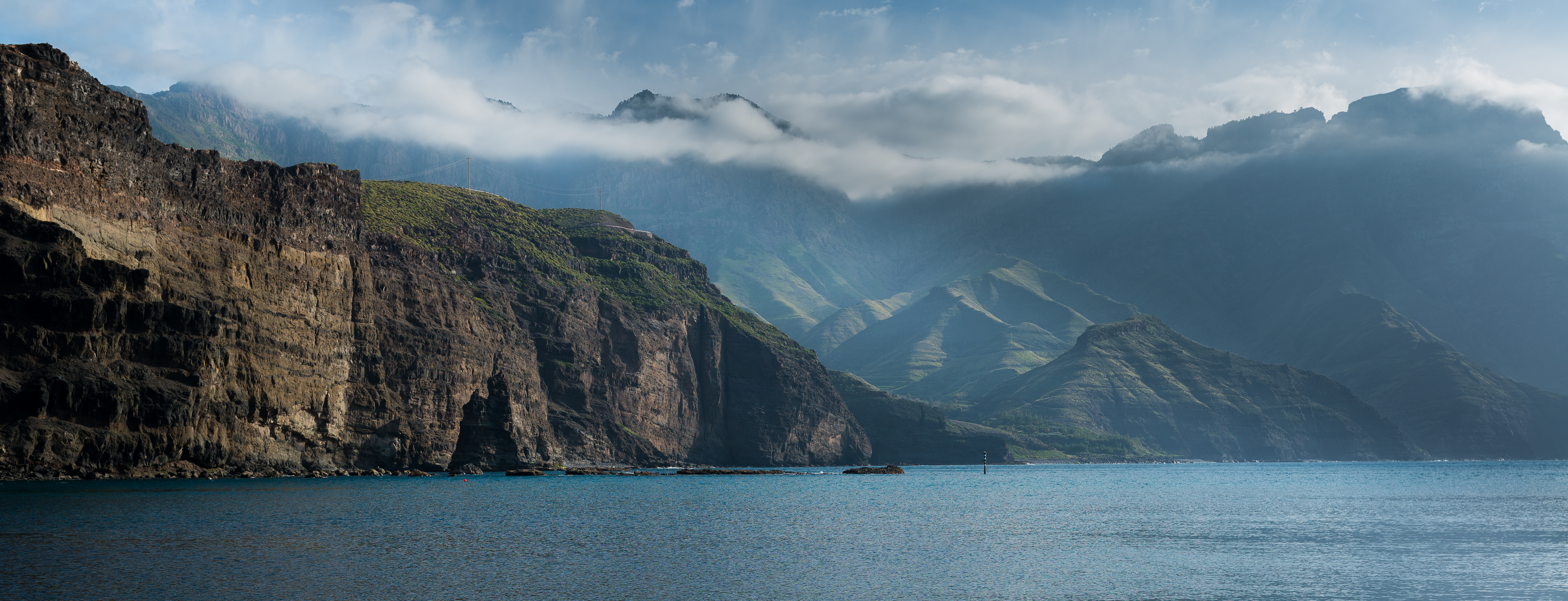
