= Morro Jable =

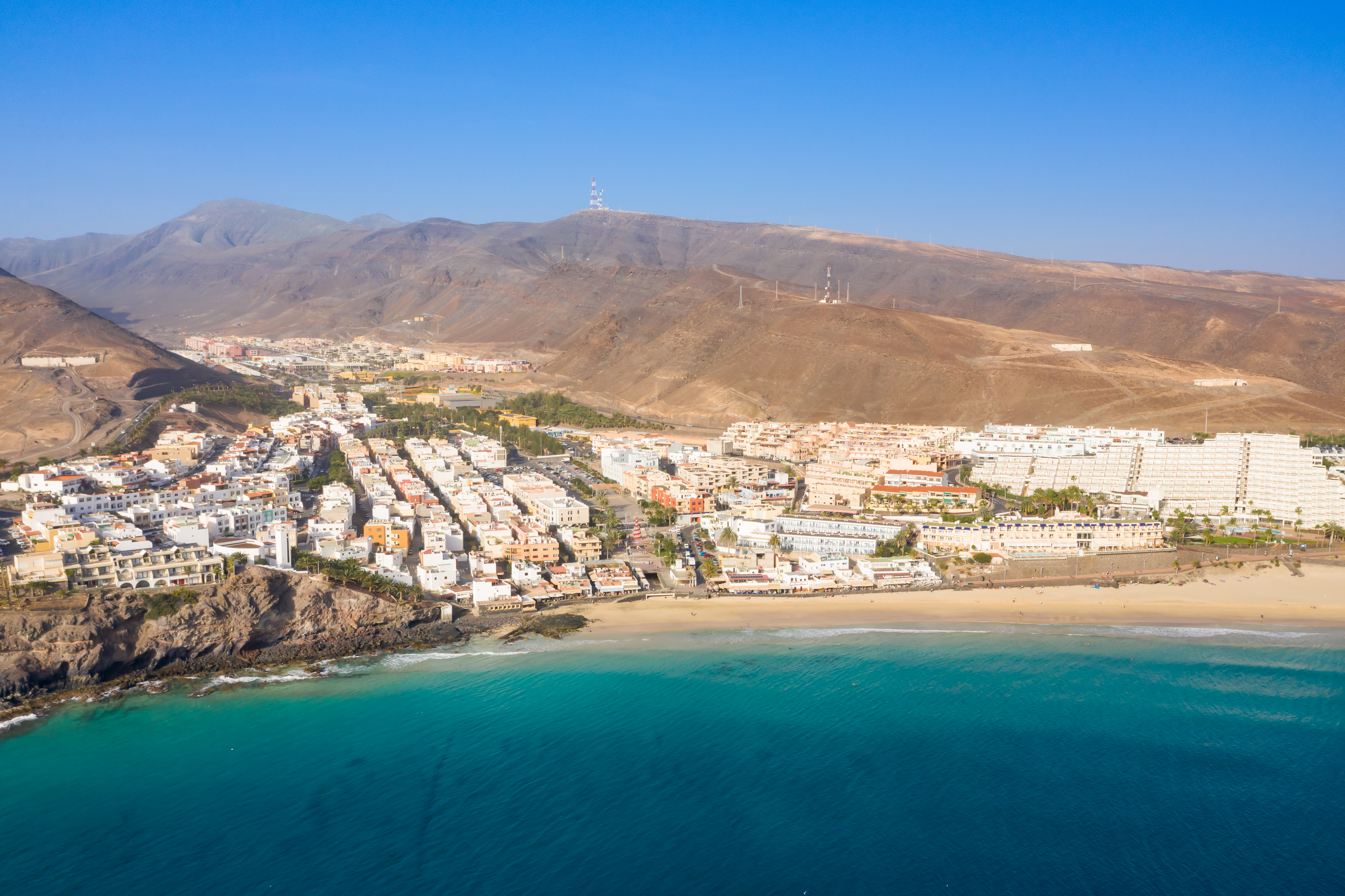
- Drone view

- Location of Cuenca within Spain
- Coordinates: 28°3′1″N 14°21′33″W
- Country: Spain
- Autonomous community: Canary Islands
- Province: Las Palmas
- Island: Fuerteventura
- Municipality: Pájara

Morro Jable is a locality belonging of the municipality of Pájara, in the island of Fuerteventura, Canary Islands, Spain. With around 7,000 inhabitants as of 2020, it is the most populated settlement in the municipality. It was founded by Cirilo López Umpiérrez, who reportedly built the first housing in 1899. Social transformation has come from tourism growth.
