= Volcan de Teno =

High speed catamaran

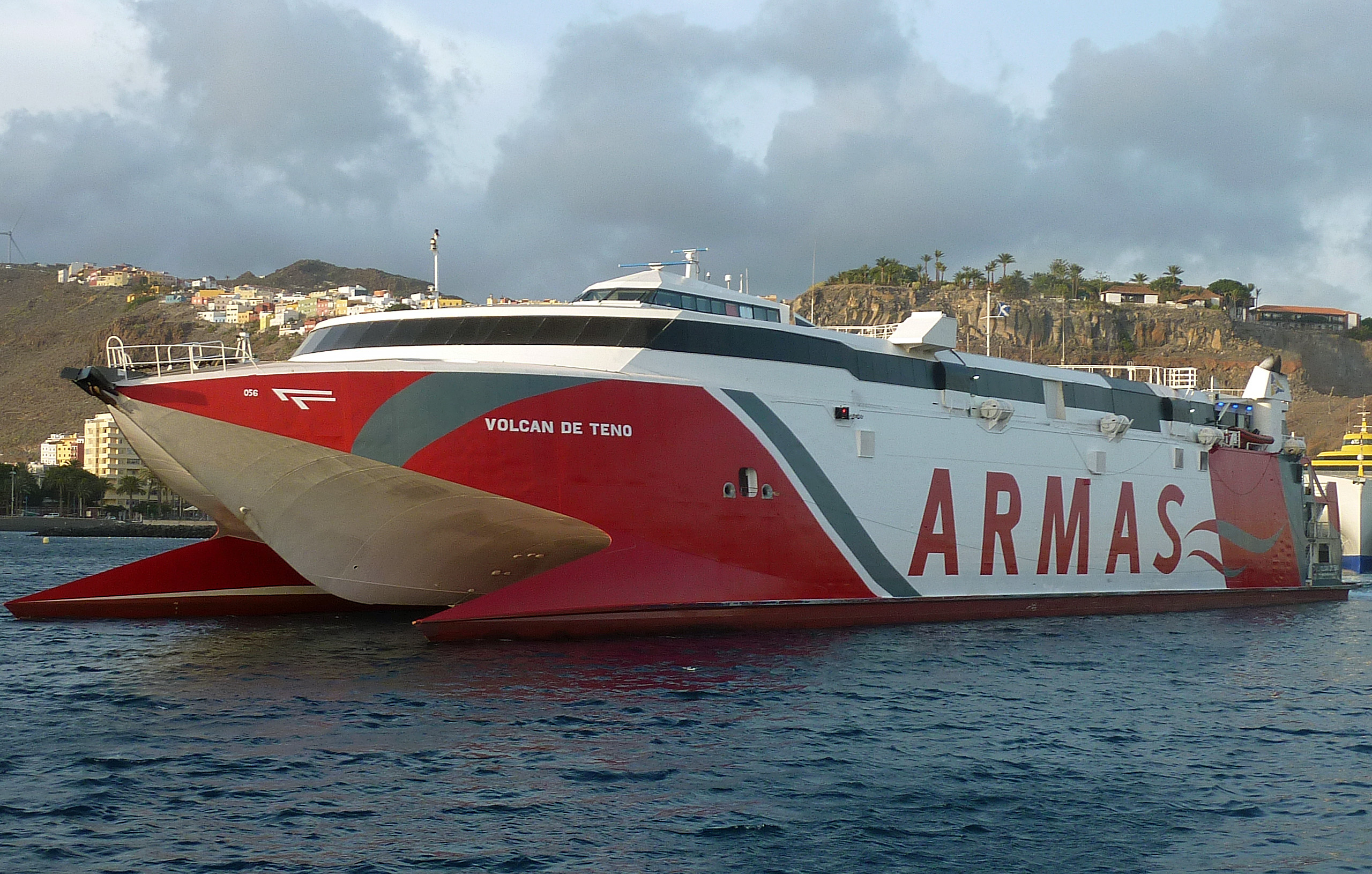
- Volcan de Teno, 2024

History
- Name: 2000-2010: Milenium; 2010-2016: Highspeed 6; 2016 onwards: Volcán de Teno
- Operator: 2000 - 2010: Trasmediterránea; 2010 - 2016: Hellenic Seaways; 2016 - 2026: Naviera Armas; 2026 onwards: Baleària Canarias
- Port of registry: 2000 - 2010: Las Palmas de Gran Canaria, Spain; 2010 - 2016: Piraeus, Greece; 2016 - onwards: Santa Cruz de Tenerife, Spain
- Route: Motril - Nador (Since March 2017) Motril - Alhucemas (Since March 2017) Santa Cruz de Tenerife - Las Palmas de Gran Canaria (2017 - 2018) Algeciras - Ceuta (2019 - 2021) Los Cristianos - San Sebastián de la Gomera - Santa Cruz de la Palma (2021) Los Cristianos - San Sebastián de la Gomera (2022) Los Cristianos - San Sebastián de la Gomera - Santa Cruz de la Palma (2023 - 2026) Algeciras - Ceuta (2026)
- Builder: Incat Tasmania Pty Ltd., Hobart, Australia
- Yard number: 056
- Launched: 2000-04-22
- Identification: IMO number: 9221346
- Status: In service

General characteristics (as built)
- Tonnage: 6,360 tonnes
- Length: 95.47 m (313.2 ft)
- Beam: 26.6 m (87.3 ft)
- Draft: 4 m (13.1 ft)
- Installed power: 4 x Ruston 20RK270 diesel engines
- Propulsion: 4 x Lips 150/3D waterjets
- Speed: 38 knots (70 km/h; 44 mph)
- Capacity: 941 passengers (including crew); 260 cars

Volcán de Teno is a high-speed vessel operated by Naviera Armas since 2017 as a catamaran ferry. It was built by the Incat Group of Companies shipyard in Hobart,Tasmania in 2000.

== Service ==
The catamaran, the last of a series of six sister units, was built at the specialized shipyard Incat in Hobart and delivered on 15 April 2000 to Trasmediterránea, for which she entered service on 9 June on the routes between Barcelona and Palma de Mallorca, where she operated alongside her sister ship Avemar. However, just two months after entering service, on 7 September the catamaran was rammed by the yacht Auriga E. off Mallorca, suffering serious damage to the bow, subsequently repaired at the Bazan shipyard in San Fernando, which kept her out of service until 18 December. In 2006 she was finally transferred to the routes between Valencia, Ibiza and Palma de Mallorca.

In early 2009, due to increasing running costs, Milenium was laid up in Palma de Mallorca and subsequently transferred to Sant Carles de la Ràpita, where she remained until May 2010, when she was sold to the Greek company Hellenic Seaways, from which she was transferred under tow to the Keratsini shipyards, where she was renamed Highspeed 6. Once the works were completed, the ferry finally entered service on 7 July on the routes between Piraeus, Serifos, Sifnos, Kimolos, Milos, Ios and Santorini, in the Cyclades. However, in early 2011 the catamaran was transferred to the routes between Piraeus, Syros, Tinos, Mykonos, Ios and Santorini.

At the end of the 2016 summer season, during which the ferry operated only on the routes between Piraeus, Ios and Santorini, the catamaran was put up for sale, being purchased in December by Naviera Armas. Following this, on 1 January it was renamed Volcán de Teno and shortly after it began service on the routes between Motril and Melilla, in the Alboran Sea. In 2018 it was then transferred to the Canary Islands, where it began service on the routes between Las Palmas de Gran Canaria and Santa Cruz de Tenerife, where it operated until 2021, except for 2019, when it operated on the routes between Algeciras and Ceuta, between the two shores of the Strait of Gibraltar. In 2021 it was finally transferred to the connections between Los Cristianos and San Sebastián de la Gomera, where it operated regularly in the following years, except for a period in 2023, when it served the connections between Las Palmas de Gran Canaria and Morro Jable.

On 25 August 2025, with the definitive cessation of activities by the shipping company, it passed together with part of the fleet to the compatriot Baleària. Following this, on 2 June 2026, with the imminent transfer of the unit under the banner of the new company, it was announced that on 15 June, the date on which the catamaran was replaced on its route by the newly acquired Pepita Castellví and the Volcán de Tirajana, the Volcán de Teno set sail for the Strait of Gibraltar, where on 1 July it replaced the Jaume III on the connections between Algeciras and Ceuta, alongside its sister ship Villa de Agaete.

== Gallery ==
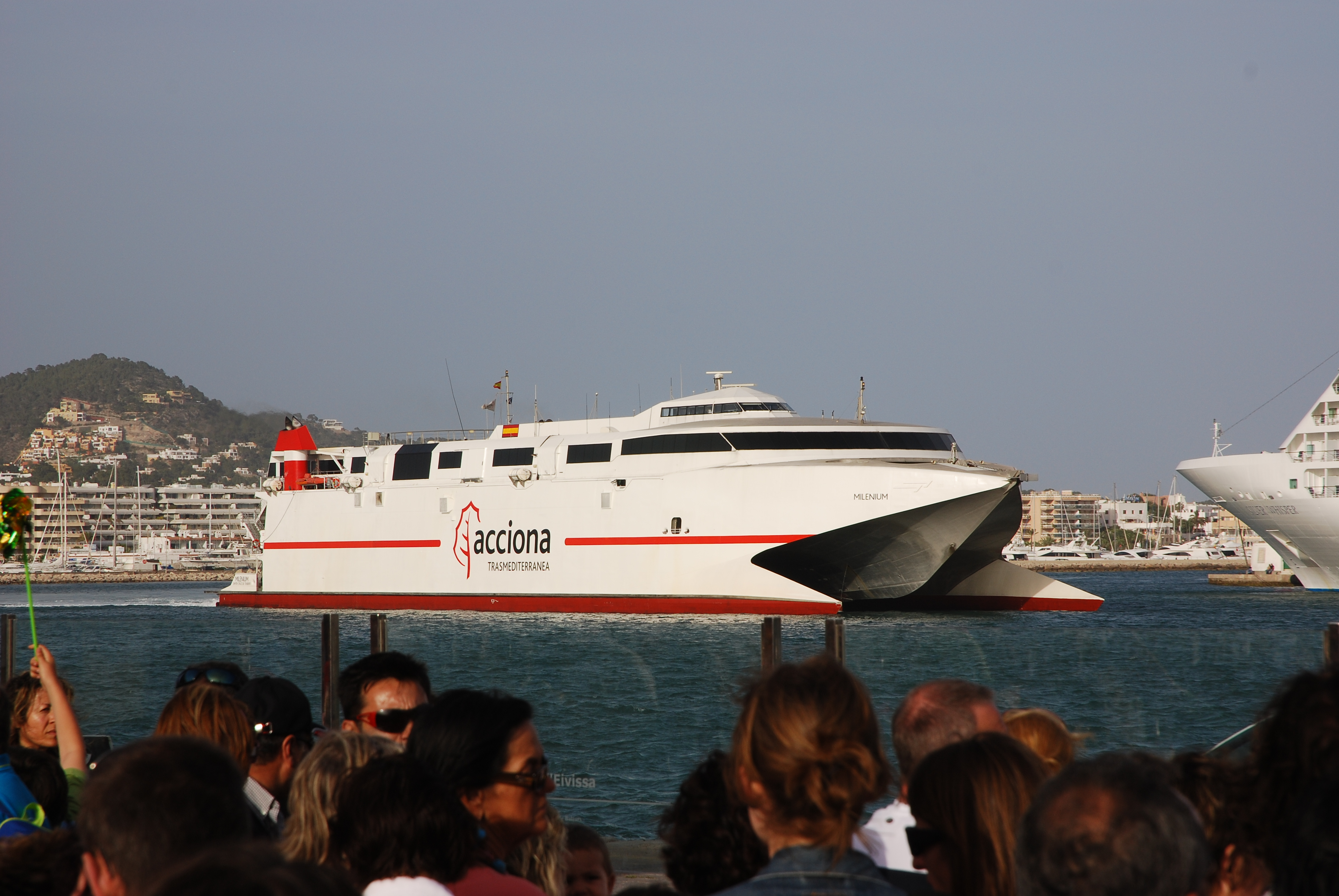
As Milenium

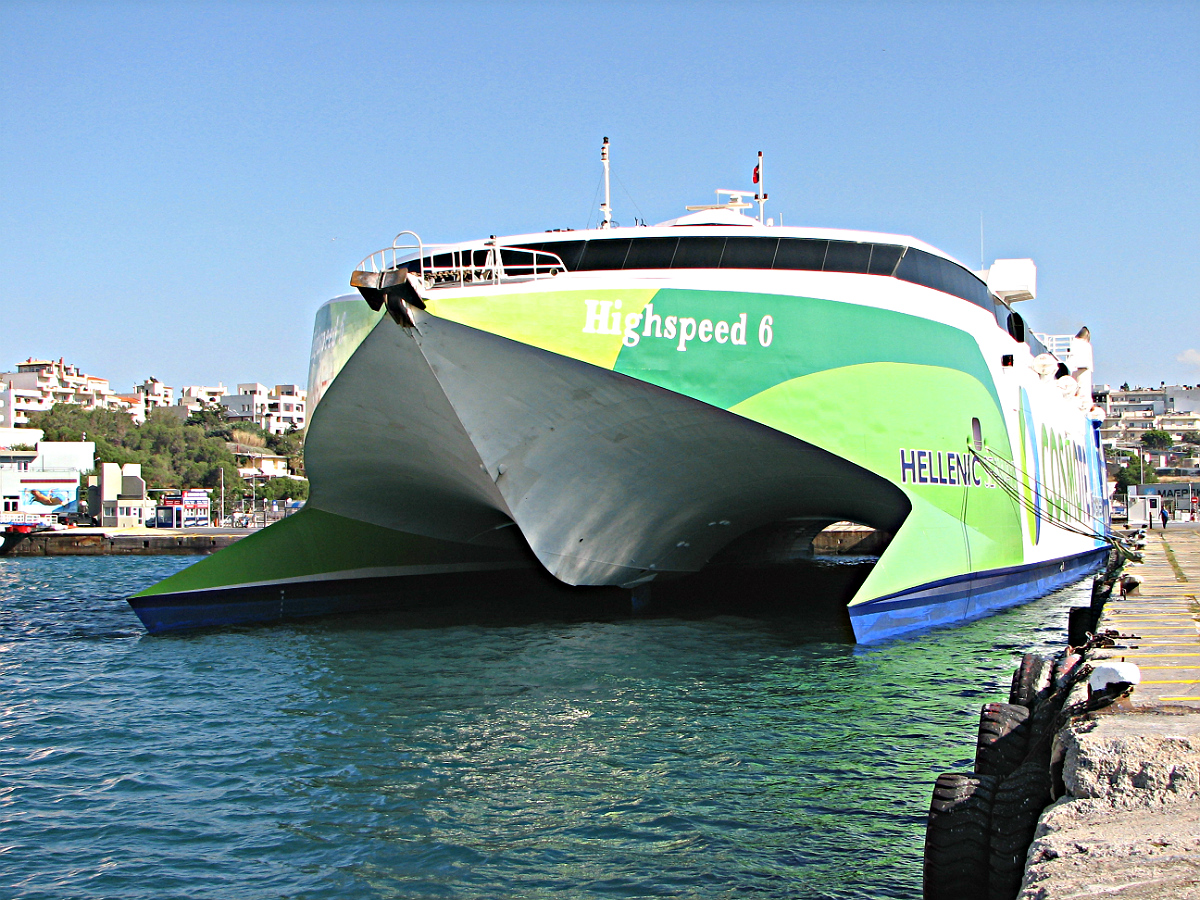
Front view

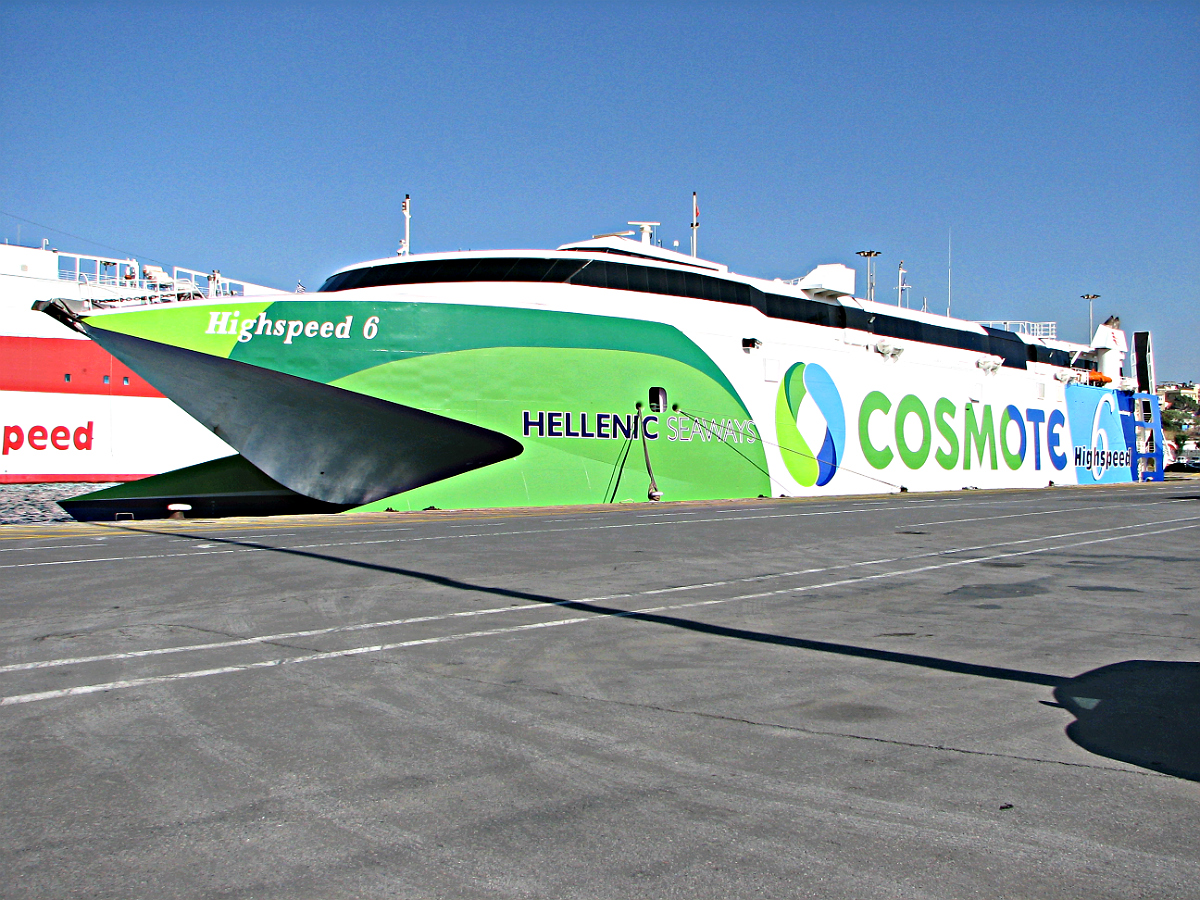
Highspeed 6 in Piraeus

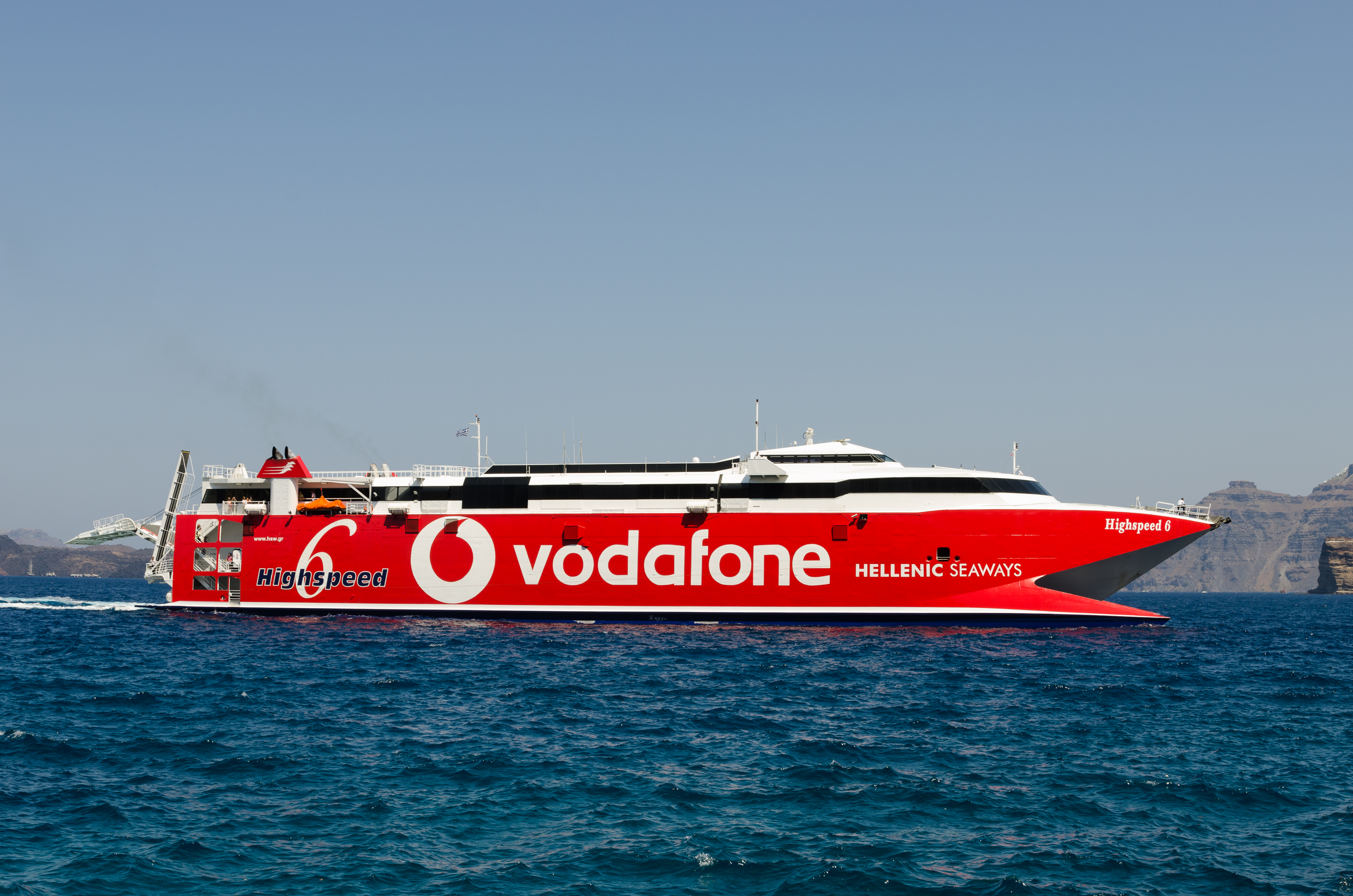
Starboard side view in old colors

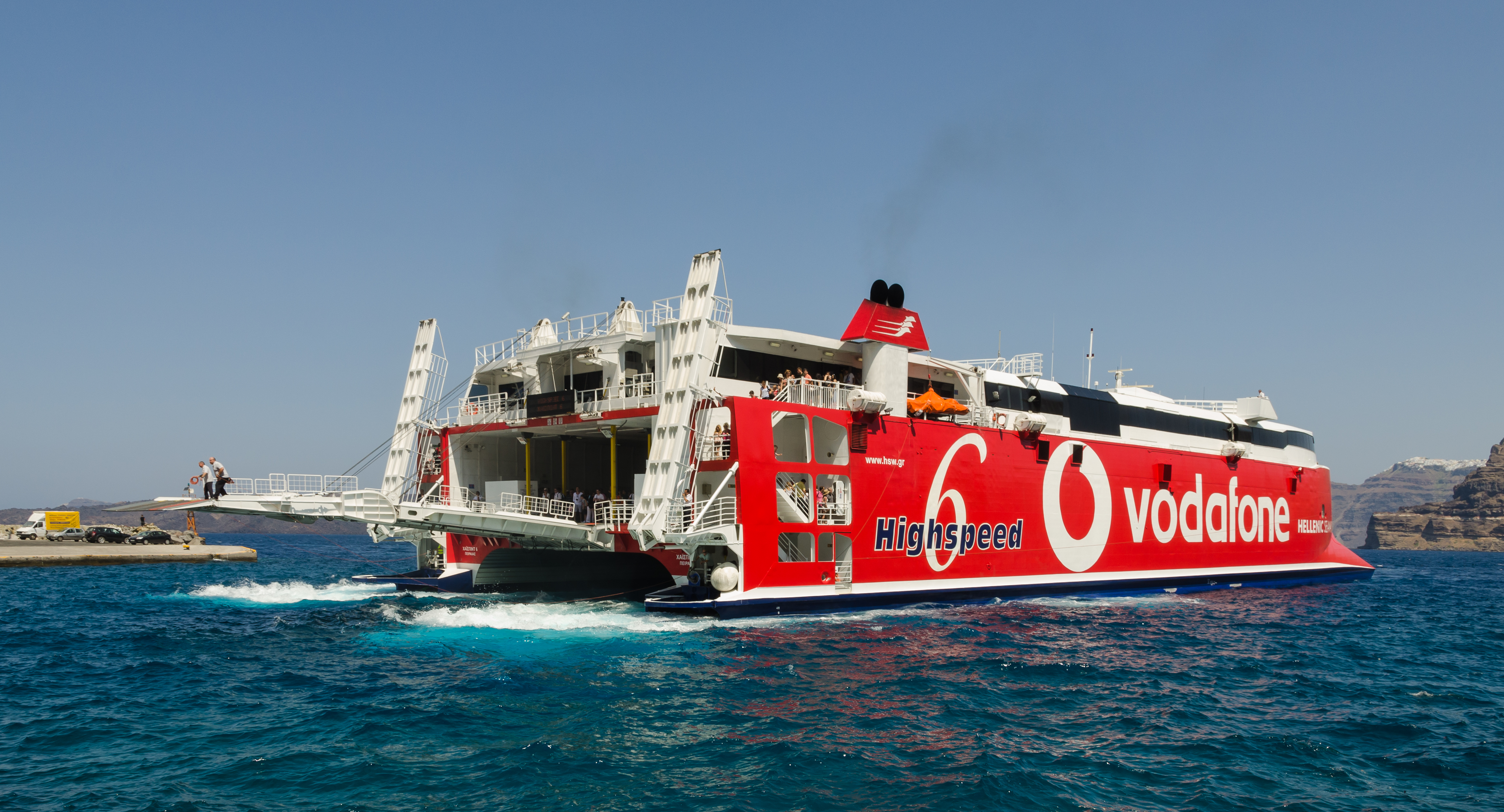
Highspeed 6 backing into dock at Santorini

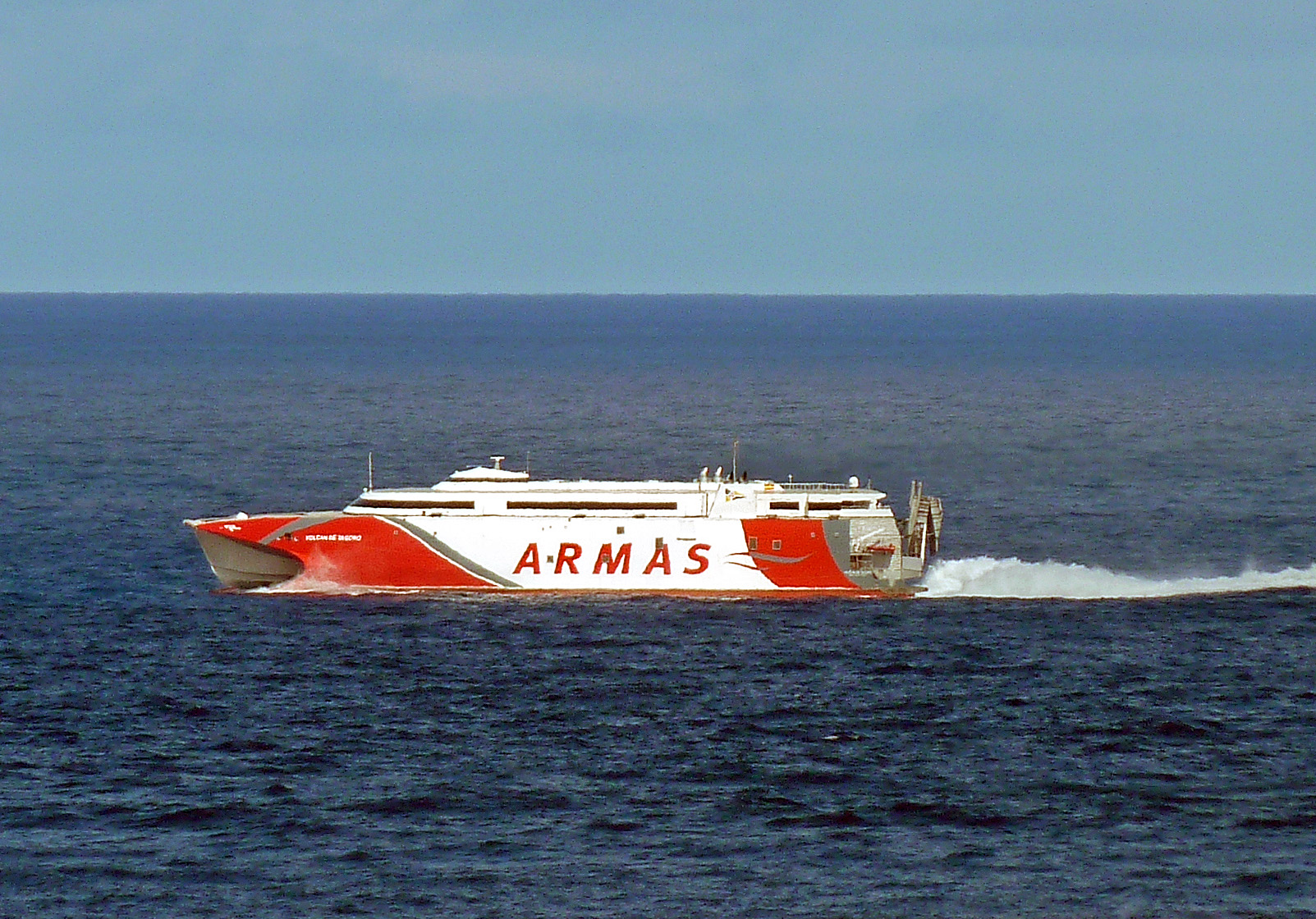
Volcan de Teno 2023
