= Andros King =

Ropax ferry

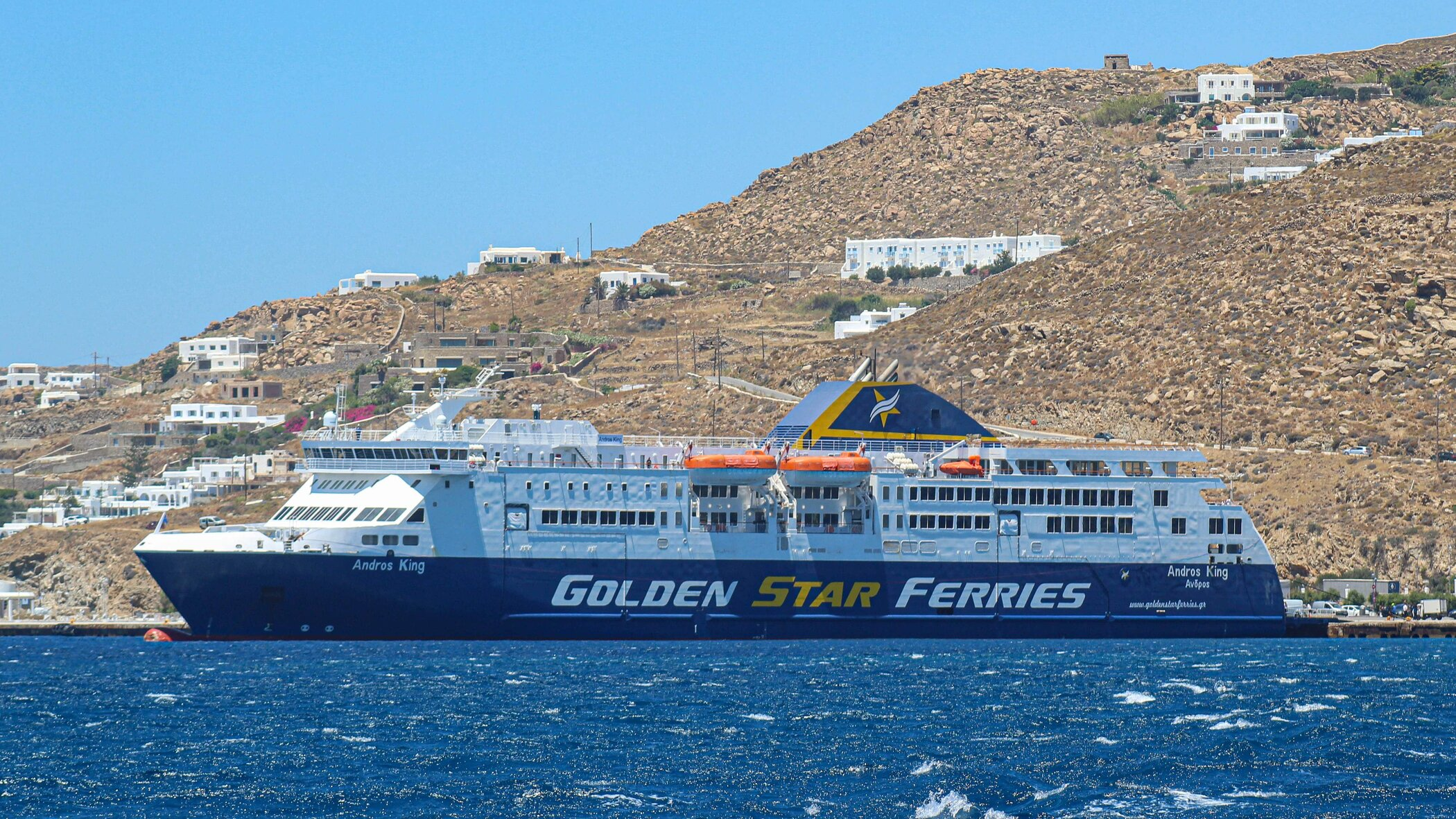
- Andros King in Mykonos

History
- Name: (2006–2024): Volcán de Taburiente; (2024–present): Andros King
- Owner: (2006–2024): Naviera Armas; (2024–present): Golden Star Ferries
- Operator: (2006–2024): Naviera Armas; (2026–present): Golden Star Ferries
- Port of registry: (2006–2024): Santa Cruz de Tenerife, Spain; (2024–2026): Basseterre, Saint Kitts and Nevis; (2026–present): Andros, Greece
- Route: Rafina–Andros–Tinos–Mykonos
- Builder: Hijos de J. Barreras S.A.; Vigo, Spain
- Yard number: 1650
- Launched: 2 December 2005
- Completed: 9 June 2006
- Acquired: July 2024
- Maiden voyage: 2006
- In service: 25 June 2006
- Identification: IMO number: 9348558; Call sign: SVDY7; MMSI number: 241938000
- Status: in service
- Notes: Extensive conversion and refit at Perama (2024–2026)

General characteristics (as rebuilt, 2026)
- Tonnage: 12,895 GT
- Length: 130.45 m (428 ft 0 in)
- Beam: 21.50 m (70 ft 6 in)
- Draft: 5.70 m (18 ft 8 in)
- Installed power: 4 × MaK 8M32 diesel engines
- Propulsion: Twin screw
- Speed: 22 knots (service); 24.5 knots (max)
- Capacity: 1,400 passengers; 310 cars
- Notes: 1,200 lane metres cargo capacity

Andros King is a ferry belonging to the Greek shipping company Golden Star Ferries. The ferry, launched on 2 December 2005 at the Hijos de J. Barreras de Vigo SA shipyard in Vigo with the name Volcán de Taburiente, was delivered on 9 June 2006 to the Spanish Naviera Armas.

== History ==
It was built by the Spanish shipyard Hijos de J. Barreras in Vigo and its routes run from Los Cristianos in Tenerife to the ports of San Sebastián de La Gomera and Santa Cruz de La Palma.

It entered service for Naviera Armas on 25 June on the routes between Los Cristianos, La Gomera and El Hierro.On 22 July 2024, after approximately eighteen years of service for the Spanish company, it was announced that it would be sold for approximately twenty million euros to Golden Star Ferries, to which it was delivered on 27 September, the day on which it was renamed Andros King. Following this, on 18 November it was transferred to the shipyard in Perama to undergo major renovation works and adaptation for the entry into the new service on the connections between Rafina, Andros, Tinos and Mykonos, which took place on 25 May 2026, after two years in the shipyard.

== Technical specifications ==
The Volcán de Taburiente is twelve meters shorter than its sister ships, the Volcán de Tamasite and the Volcán de Timanfaya. Its maximum passenger capacity is 1,500. With decks 3 and 5, the ship has two full cargo decks and one car deck. This configuration allows it to transport 103 cars and 28 semi-trailers , or up to a maximum of 305 cars. Its service speed is 22.5 knots.

== Machinery ==
The engine system consists of four Caterpillar MaK 9M32C nine-cylinder, four-stroke, in-line diesel engines . Each engine is rated at 4,500 kW at 600 rpm. Two 3.7-meter diameter controllable-pitch propellers are each driven by two engines. A 2 × 720 kW transverse propulsion control system is available for maneuvering in the sometimes very confined harbor facilities. Two generators driven by the main engines and two Wärtsilä diesel generators, each rated at approximately 900 kW (1,125 kVA), power the electrical system. The emergency generator has a capacity of 277 kW (346 kVA).

== Accidents and Incidents ==
=== 2014 Fire ===
On the evening of 25 April 2014, the 130-meter ro-ro passenger ferry Volcán de Taburiente suffered a cargo fire shortly after departing from the port of Los Cristianos in Tenerife, Canary Islands. The vessel was carrying 319 passengers, 15 crew members, and various vehicles on its scheduled route to San Sebastián de La Gomera.

Approximately 20 minutes into the crossing, a fire broke out inside a truck parked on one of the lower vehicle decks. Emergency services were immediately notified, prompting the dispatch of maritime search and rescue vessels, a neighboring passenger catamaran, and helicopters to the scene. The ferry's crew deployed the onboard water and foam fire suppression system, successfully containing and extinguishing the blaze before it could spread further.

Thirteen passengers were treated by medical personnel for minor conditions, primarily related to smoke inhalation and acute anxiety. The Volcán de Taburiente safely returned to Los Cristianos under its own power, where local firefighters completely doused the remaining hot spots. The vessel was subsequently detained for damage assessment and safety inspections.

==== 2026 Collision ====
On the evening of 8 June 2026, the ro-ro passenger ferry Andros King allided with the northern pier at the port of Rafina, Greece, while arriving from its regular route from Mykonos, Tinos, and Andros. The vessel was carrying 283 passengers and 80 vehicles at the time of the incident.

The impact caused the pier to break apart and resulted in damage to the ferry's bulbous bow. Local port authorities reported no injuries among the passengers or crew. Following a structural inspection that verified the vessel's seaworthiness, the Andros King was cleared to resume its scheduled service the following day on 9 June.
