= Volcan de Taidia =

Incat HSC catamaran operated by Naviera Armas

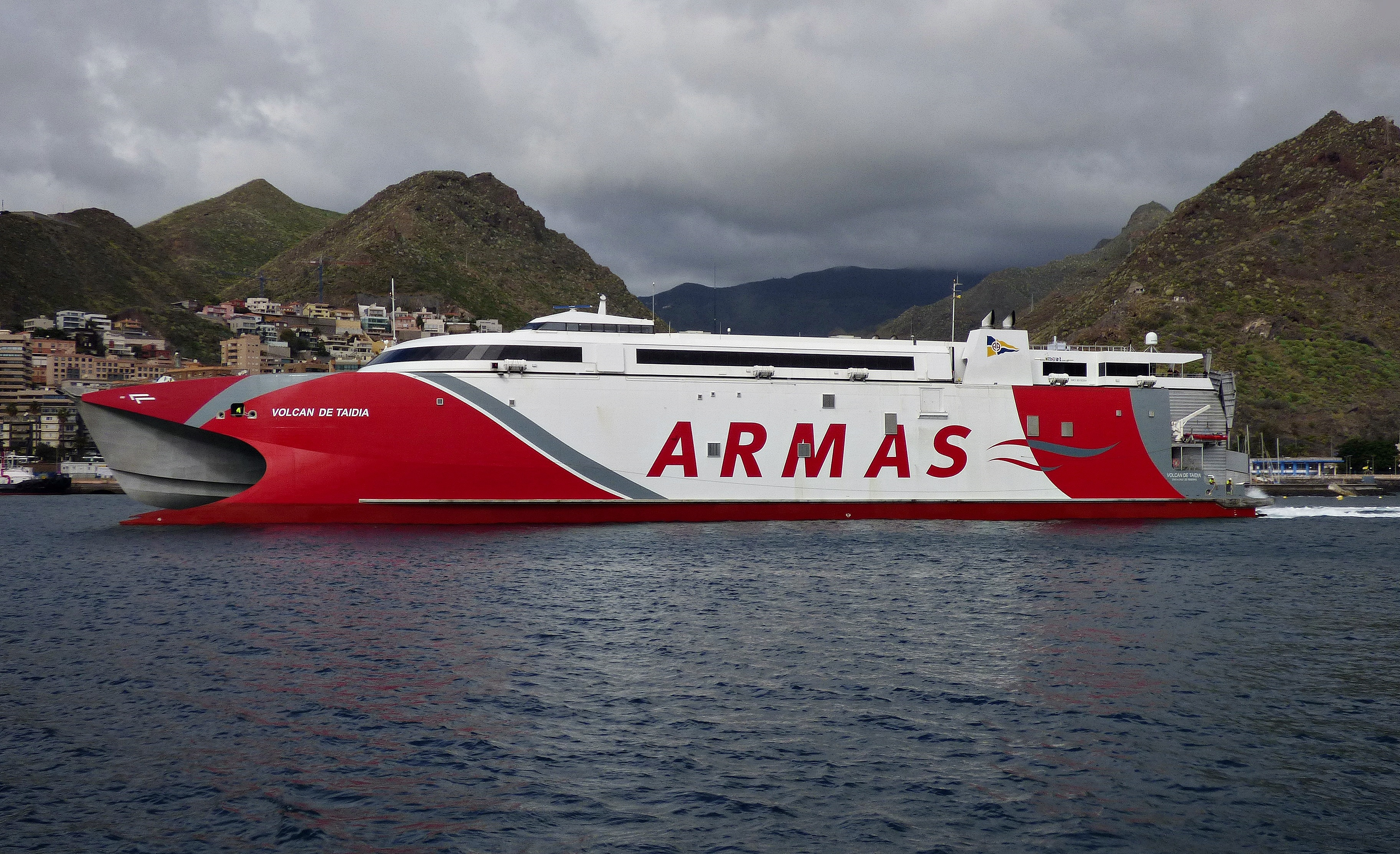
- Volcan de Taidia in Santa Cruz de Tenerife

History
- Name: Volcán de Taidía
- Owner: (2021–present): Fast Ferry Leasing Ltd
- Operator: Naviera Armas
- Port of registry: Santa Cruz de Tenerife, Spain
- Route: Santa Cruz de Tenerife – Las Palmas; Morro Jable – Las Palmas
- Ordered: 2018
- Builder: Incat Tasmania; Hobart, Tasmania, Australia
- Yard number: 093
- Laid down: 28 September 2018
- Launched: 23 June 2021
- Completed: 22 September 2021
- Acquired: September 2021
- Maiden voyage: October 2021
- In service: October 2021
- Identification: IMO number: 9916264; Call sign: EBSU; MMSI number: 224984000
- Status: In service

General characteristics
- Class & type: Incat 111m wave-piercing catamaran
- Tonnage: 11,213 GT; 952 DWT
- Length: 111.00 m (364 ft 2 in)
- Beam: 30.50 m (100 ft 1 in)
- Draft: 4.16 m (13 ft 8 in)
- Decks: 3
- Ramps: Rear loading ramps
- Installed power: 4 × MAN 20V28/33D STC diesel engines (total 36,400 kW)
- Propulsion: 4 × Wärtsilä waterjets
- Speed: 35.0 knots (64.8 km/h; 40.3 mph) (service) 42.4 knots (78.5 km/h; 48.8 mph) (max in sea trials)
- Capacity: 1,184 passengers; 401 cars (or 595 lane metres of trucks + 219 cars)
- Crew: 16
- Notes: Designed by Revolution Design; equipped with an active ride control system.

Volcán de Taidía is a 111-metre high-speed wave-piercing catamaran ferry operated by Spanish shipping line Naviera Armas. Built in Australia by Incat and delivered in late 2021, she is the sister ship to Volcán de Tagoro. Designed specifically to deliver high-capacity passenger and freight transport at high speed, the vessel primarily operates inter-island routes across the Canary Islands, bridging Santa Cruz de Tenerife and Las Palmas de Gran Canaria.

== Service ==
The catamaran, the second of a series of two sister units commissioned on 15 December 2017 by Naviera Armas to the specialized shipyard Incat, was launched on 23 June 2021 in the Hobart shipyard with the name of Volcán de Taidía and delivered on 24 September to the Spanish company. Following this, on 29 September the catamaran sailed from Tasmania to Spain, where on 25 October it began service on the connections between Las Palmas de Gran Canaria and Santa Cruz de Tenerife, where it joined its sister ship Volcán de Tagoro.
