= Volcan de Tirajana =

Fast ferry catamaran operated by Naviera Armas

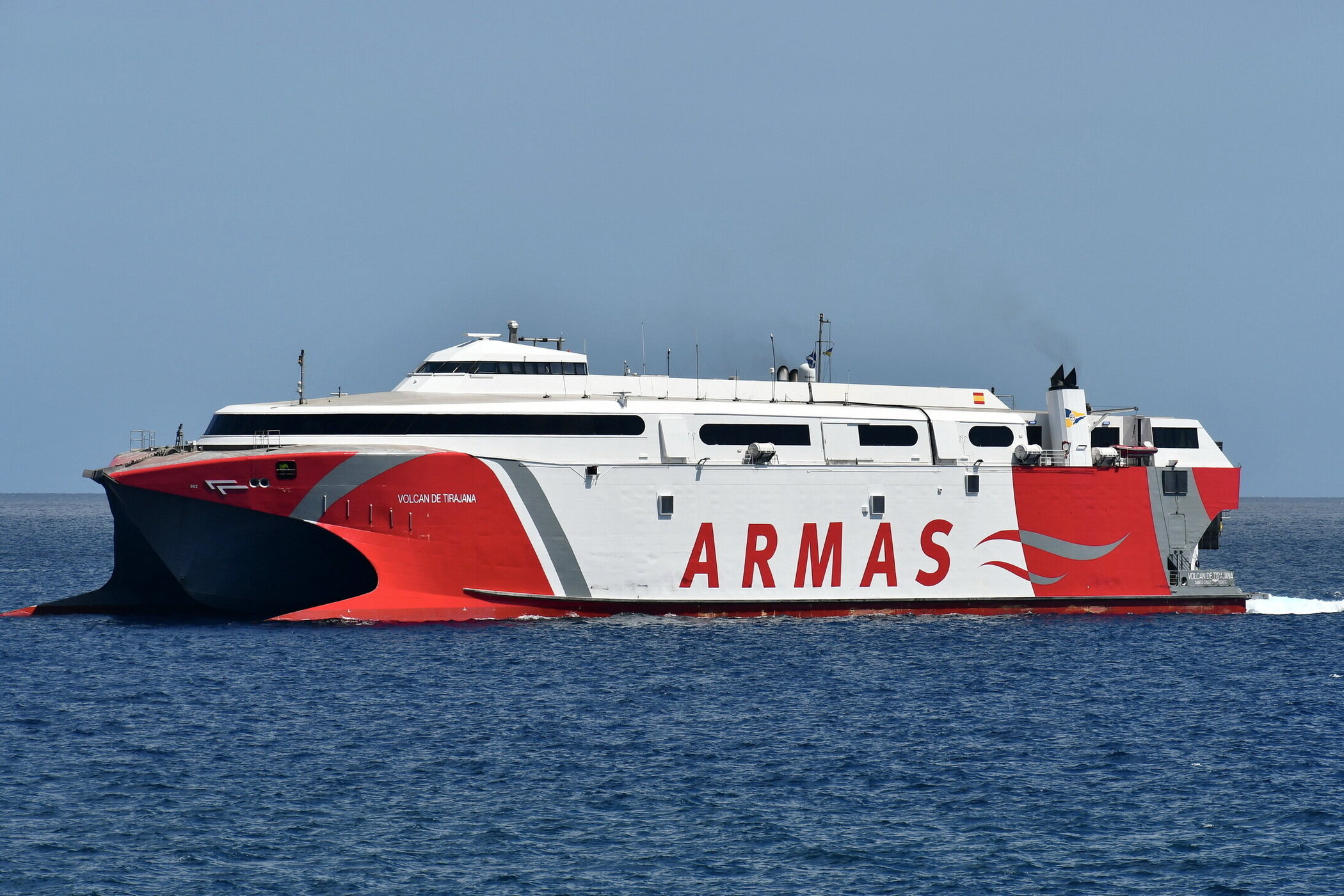
- Volcan de Tirajana in Los Cristianos

History
- Name: (2006–2015): Milenium Tres; (2015–present): Volcán de Tirajana
- Owner: (2006–2015): Acciona Trasmediterránea; (2015–present): Naviera Armas
- Operator: (2006–2015): Acciona Trasmediterránea; (2015–present): Naviera Armas
- Port of registry: Santa Cruz de Tenerife, Spain
- Route: Los Cristianos – San Sebastián de La Gomera; Los Cristianos – Valverde (El Hierro)
- Ordered: 2004
- Builder: Incat Tasmania; Hobart, Tasmania, Australia
- Yard number: 062
- Launched: 2006
- Completed: May 2006
- Acquired: 2015
- Maiden voyage: 2006
- In service: 2006
- Identification: IMO number: 9294226; Call sign: ECLQ; MMSI number: 224836000
- Status: In service

General characteristics
- Class & type: Incat 98m wave-piercing catamaran
- Tonnage: 6,662 GT; 710 DWT
- Length: 97.20 m (318 ft 11 in)
- Beam: 26.60 m (87 ft 3 in)
- Draft: 3.40 m (11 ft 2 in)
- Depth: 7.70 m (25 ft 3 in)
- Decks: 3
- Ramps: Stern loading ramps
- Installed power: 4 * MAN-B&W 16RK280
- Propulsion: 4 × Lips waterjets
- Speed: 35.0 knots (64.8 km/h; 40.3 mph) (service) 47.0 knots (87.0 km/h; 54.1 mph) (max)
- Capacity: 900 passengers; 287 cars

Volcán de Tirajana is a 97-metre high-speed wave-piercing catamaran passenger and vehicle ferry operated by the Spanish shipping line Naviera Armas. Built in Australia by Incat Tasmania in 2006, she originally entered service as Milenium Tres for Acciona Trasmediterránea. Acquired by Naviera Armas in 2015 and renamed Volcán de Tirajana, the vessel currently operates high-speed ferry routes in the Canary Islands, primarily linking Los Cristianos with San Sebastián de La Gomera and El Hierro.

== Service ==
The catamaran, the last of a series of six sister units, and built on a speculative basis, was laid down on 3 December 2003 at the specialized shipyard Incat in Hobart, Tasmania and put up for sale pending the purchase of buyers, necessary for the continuation of the work. Following this, approximately three years later, on 16 May 2006 the catamaran was purchased by Acciona Trasmediterránea, for which it was then launched on 6 August under the name Milenium Tres. Completed on 27 August, the new fast ferry was finally delivered to the Spanish company on 19 September and six days later left Tasmania for Spain, where it entered service on 28 November on the routes between Almería, Malaga and Melilla. In the following years, Milenium Tres continued to operate in the Alboran Sea and the Strait of Gibraltar, being occasionally used also on the connections to the Balearic Islands.

On 16 January 2015, after almost ten years of service for Trasmediterránea, the catamaran was sold to its compatriot Naviera Armas, by which it was renamed Volcán de Tirajana and immediately put on the routes between Motril and Melilla.The following spring it was then transferred to the Canary Islands, where it entered service on 16 June on the routes between El Hierro and Los Cristianos, replacing its almost twin Alborán.

== Sister ships ==
- Voyager
- Barlovento Express
- Hai Xia Hao
- T&T Spirit
- Ift
