= Volcán de Tindaya =

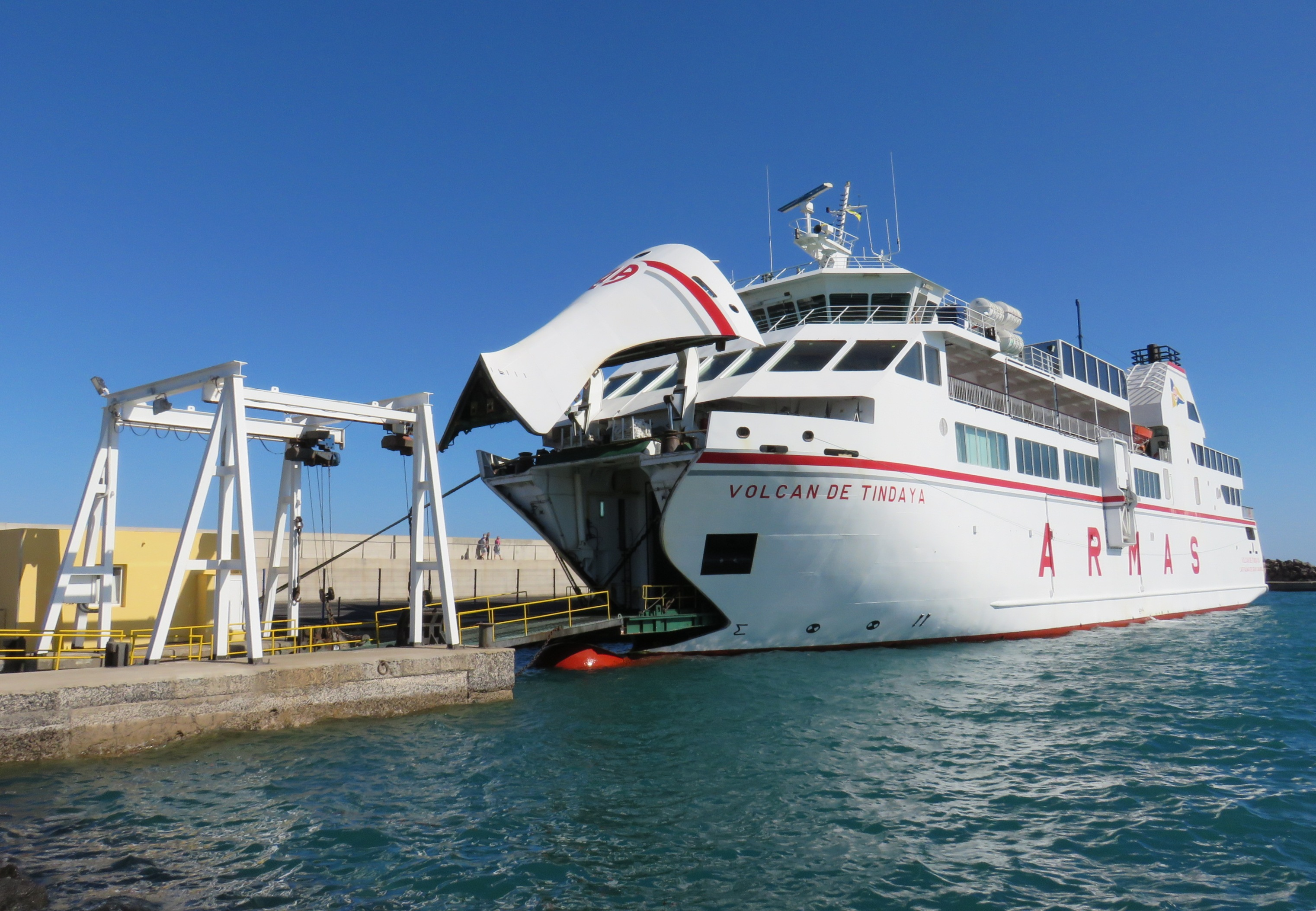
- Volcán de Tindaya moored at the ferry terminal in Corralejo

History

Spain
- Name: Volcán de Tindaya
- Owner: Marítima de las Islas, S.L.
- Operator: Naviera Armas
- Port of registry: Spain
- Route: Playa Blanca - Corralejo
- Builder: Hijos de J. Barreras
- Yard number: 1617
- Completed: 2002
- Identification: Call sign: ECCK; IMO number: 9268411; MMSI number: 224127000
- Status: In service

General characteristics
- Class & type: RO-RO passenger ship
- Tonnage: 3,715 GT
- Length: 78.10 m (256.2 ft)
- Beam: 15.50 m (50.9 ft)
- Draught: 3.3 m (11 ft)
- Decks: 3
- Installed power: 2 × 2,600 kW diesel engines; 2 × 550 kW auxiliary diesel engines
- Propulsion: 2 propellers + 2 bow thrusters
- Speed: 16 kn (30 km/h; 18 mph)
- Capacity: 700 passengers; 120 cars

Volcán de Tindaya is a roll-on/roll-off passenger ferry operated by the Spanish shipping company Naviera Armas between the Canary Islands of Fuerteventura and Lanzarote in the Atlantic Ocean. It was built and delivered to Armas in 2002 and has been operating the route between the towns of Corralejo (Fuerteventura) and Playa Blanca (Lanzarote) since then. The ship is named after the Tindaya mountain on Fuerteventura.

== Design and construction ==
Volcán de Tindaya was built in Vigo, Spain by Hijos de J. Barreras. The vessel is 78.10 metres (256.2 ft) long, 15.50 metres (50.9 ft) wide, and has a draught of 3.3 metres (11 ft). It has a service speed of 16 knots (30 km/h; 18 mph).

The vessel is powered by two main diesel engines, each capable of providing 2,600 kilowatts (3,500 hp) of power, and two auxiliary diesel engines, each capable of providing 550 kilowatts (740 hp) of power. The diesel engines drive two 315 rpm propellers. The ship also has two transverse 330 kW electrically driven bow thrusters.

The ship can transport up to 700 passengers (including crew) and 120 vehicles over a range of approximately 2,600 miles (4,200 km). Passengers are distributed over three decks and there is a single vehicle deck.

== See also ==
Ships covering the same route

- HSC Bocayna Express
