= Trasmediterránea =

Spanish shipping company

Compañia Trasmediterránea S.A.
- Founded: 1916
- Headquarters: Madrid, Spain
- Area served: Balearic Islands, Spain, Algeria, Morocco
- Services: Passenger transportation, Freight transportation
- Website: www.trasmediterranea.es

Trasmediterránea operates passengers and cargo ferries between mainland Spain and the Balearic Islands, as well as northern Africa's Spanish territories. Since 2017 the majority of the company belongs to Naviera Armas.

== History ==
The Trasmediterránea ("cross-mediterranean") company was constituted on 26 November 1916, with the fusion of the companies of shipowners José Juan Dómine, Vicente Ferrer, Joaquín Tintoré and Enrique García, though it didn't start operating until 1 January the following year. It was headquartered in Barcelona and had a fleet of 45 ships.

During the Spanish Civil War, its ships were used as auxiliary navy ships by both sides of the conflict, the Spanish Republican Navy and the Nationalist faction.

In 1978, it became a state-owned company, until it was privatized by the PP government in 2002. The SEPI sold the company to a consortium that consisted of Acciona Logística (60%), Caja de Ahorros del Mediterráneo, Compañía de Remolcadores Ibaizábal, Agrupación Hotelera Dóliga, Suministros Ibiza and Naviera Armas. Later, the company changed its name to Acciona-Trasmediterranea. Currently it operates a fleet of 25 ships and is headquartered in Madrid.

From 1921 to 1998, when the sector was liberalized, it had the monopoly on the lines that linked the mainland Spain with the islands and northern Africa. Today, even as it has lost its monopoly and has competition, Trasmediterránea is still leader in its sector.

At the end of October 2017, Acciona group agreed to sell its 92.7% stake in Trasmediterránea to Naviera Armas, another Spanish shipping company operating ferries mainly in the Canary Islands. The deal, pending approval by Spanish authorities, was expected to be completed in the first quarter of 2018.

In August 2025, Baleària reached an agreement to take over both Naviera Armas and Trasmediterranea operations in the Canary Islands and Alboran Sea, alongside a part of the operations across the Strait of Gibraltar. As part of the agreement, Balearia would take over 15 ferries, several routes, and staff. DFDS Seaways would acquire the majority of the Strait business, taking control of the Volcan de Tamasite and the Villa de Agaete, as well as operations in Algeciras, Ceuta, and Tanger Med. The agreement would take place, pending approval from the National Commission on Markets and Competition (CNMC) of Spain. In March 2026, the CNMC approved the Baleària deal.

== Company activity ==
Map of the Balearic Islands

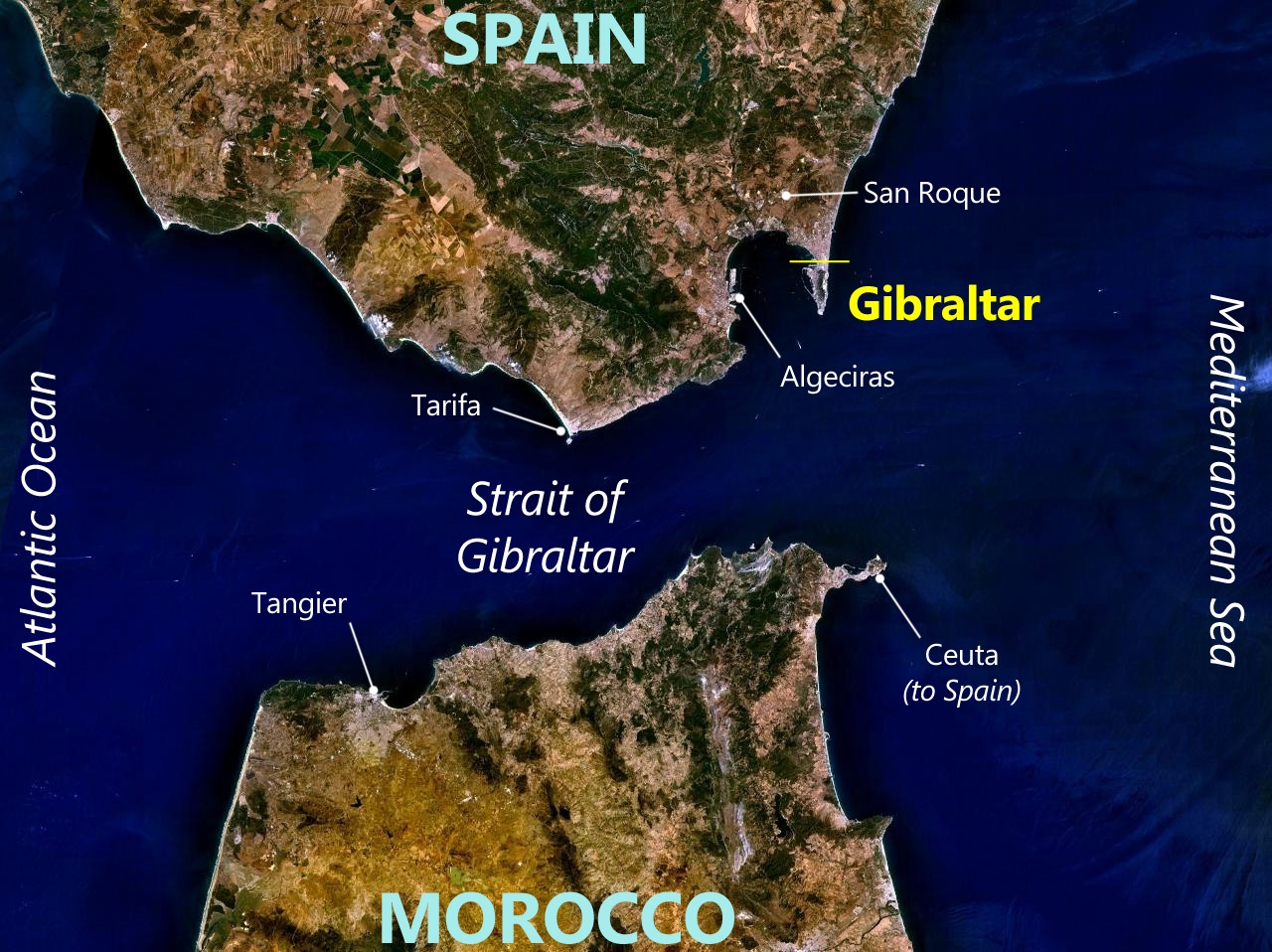
Annotated satellite view of the Strait of Gibraltar

Trasmediterránea has its own maritime stations in Barcelona, Las Palmas de Gran Canaria and Valencia. The company's activity is structured in four zones:

- Canarias-Cádiz: regular lines, in both directions, from:
  - Cádiz to Santa Cruz de Tenerife, Las Palmas, Santa Cruz de la Palma and Arrecife.
  - Arrecife to Cádiz, Las Palmas de Gran Canaria and Puerto del Rosario.
  - Santa Cruz de la Palma to Arrecife, Cádiz, Las Palmas de Gran Canaria and Santa Cruz de Tenerife.
  - Santa Cruz de Tenerife to Arrecife, Cádiz, Las Palmas de Gran Canaria, Morro Jable and Santa Cruz de la Palma.
- Inter-Canarian:
  - Las Palmas de Gran Canaria to Arrecife, Morro Jable, Puerto del Rosario, Santa Cruz de Tenerife and Santa Cruz de la Palma.
- Mainland-Baleares: regular lines, in both directions, from:
  - Barcelona to Palma de Mallorca, Ibiza and Mahón.
  - Valencia to Palma de Mallorca, Ibiza and Mahón.
  - Gandía to Palma de Mallorca and Ibiza.
- South-Strait: regular lines, in both directions, from:
  - Algeciras to Ceuta and Tánger (Morocco)
  - Almería to Ghazaouet and Orán (Algeria), Melilla and Nador (Morocco).
  - Málaga to Melilla.
- United Kingdom: Previously operated regular lines, in both directions from:
  - Bilbao to Portsmouth (service now discontinued).

== Fleet ==
=== Current ===
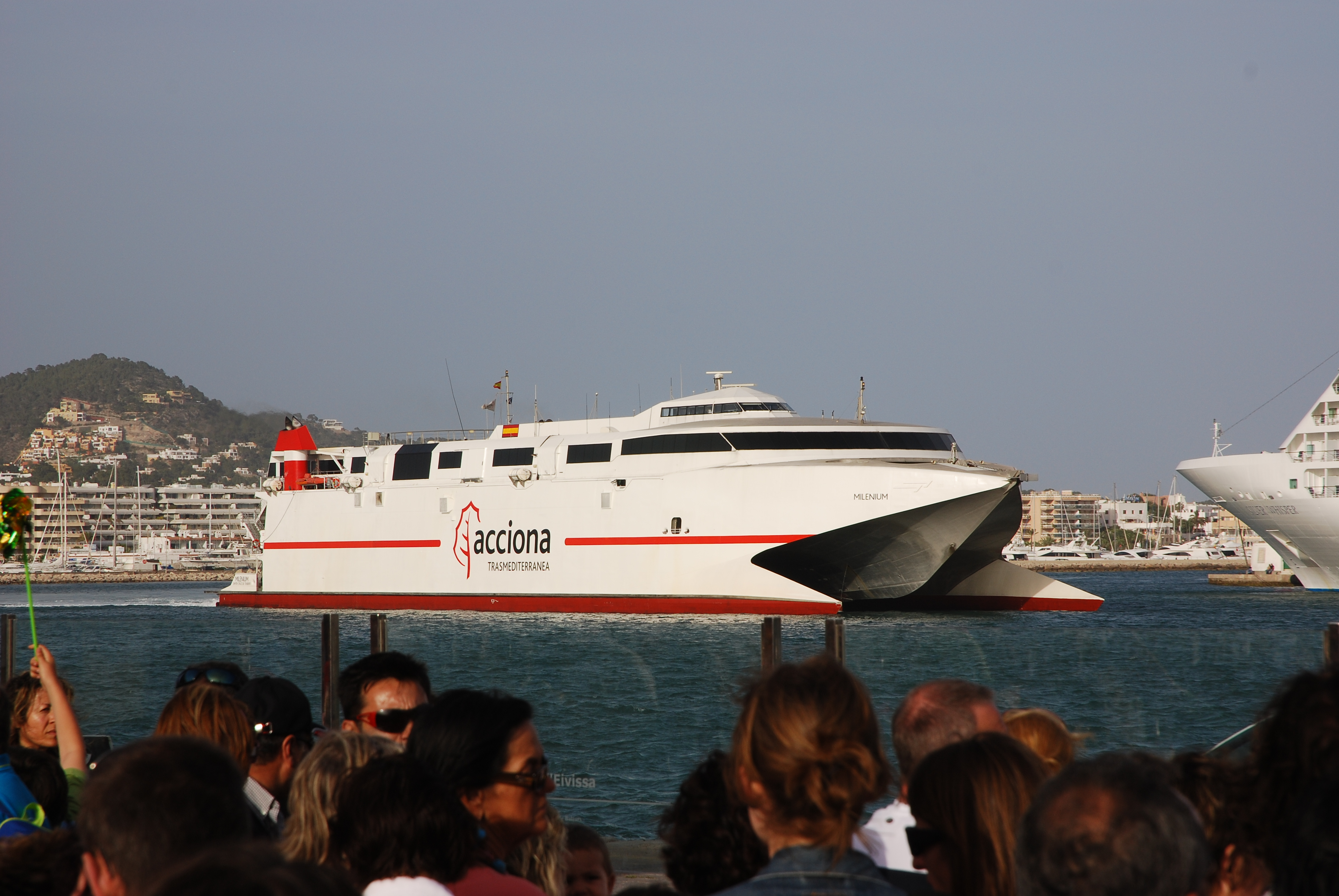
Milenium

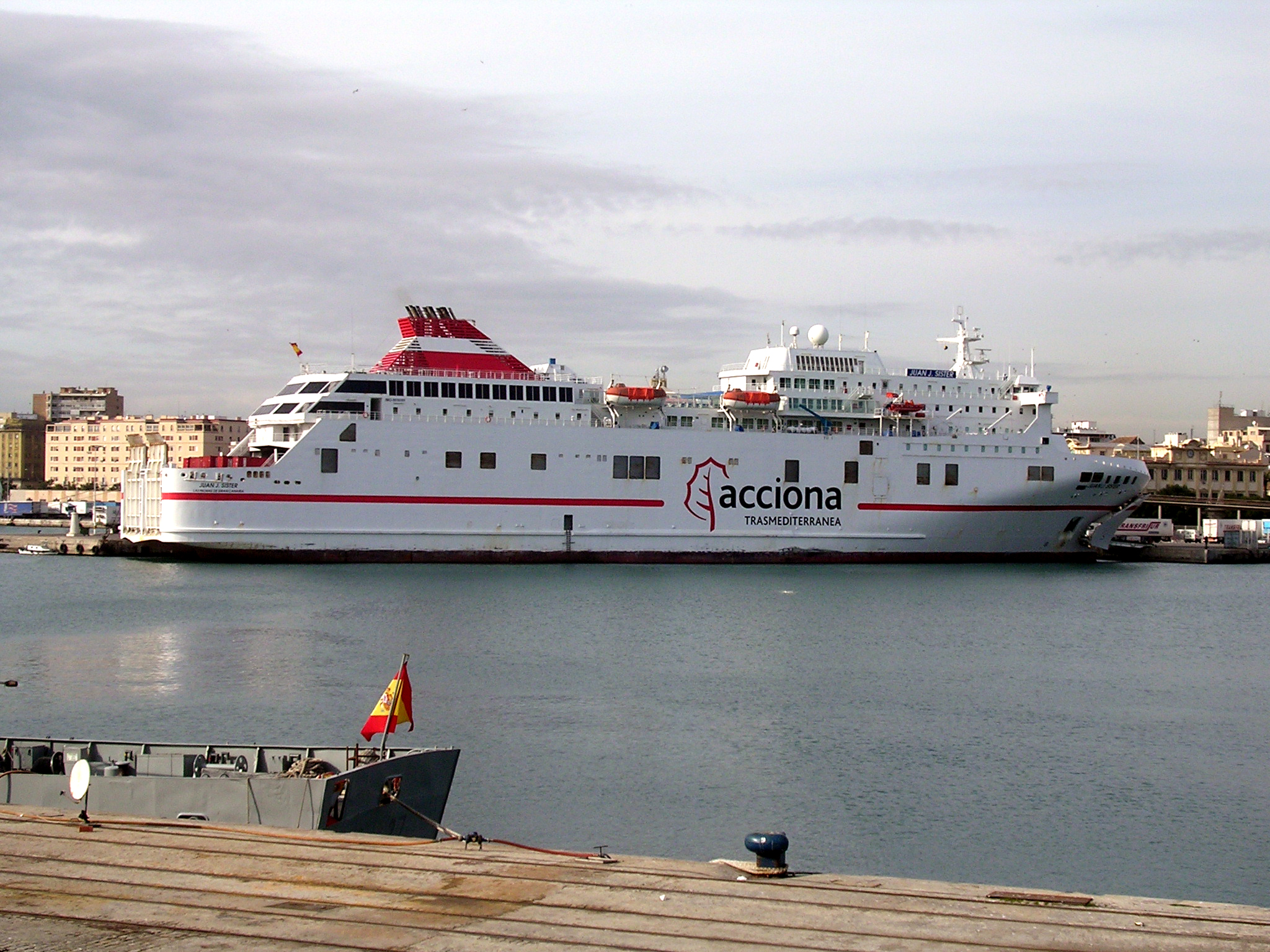
Juan J. Sister

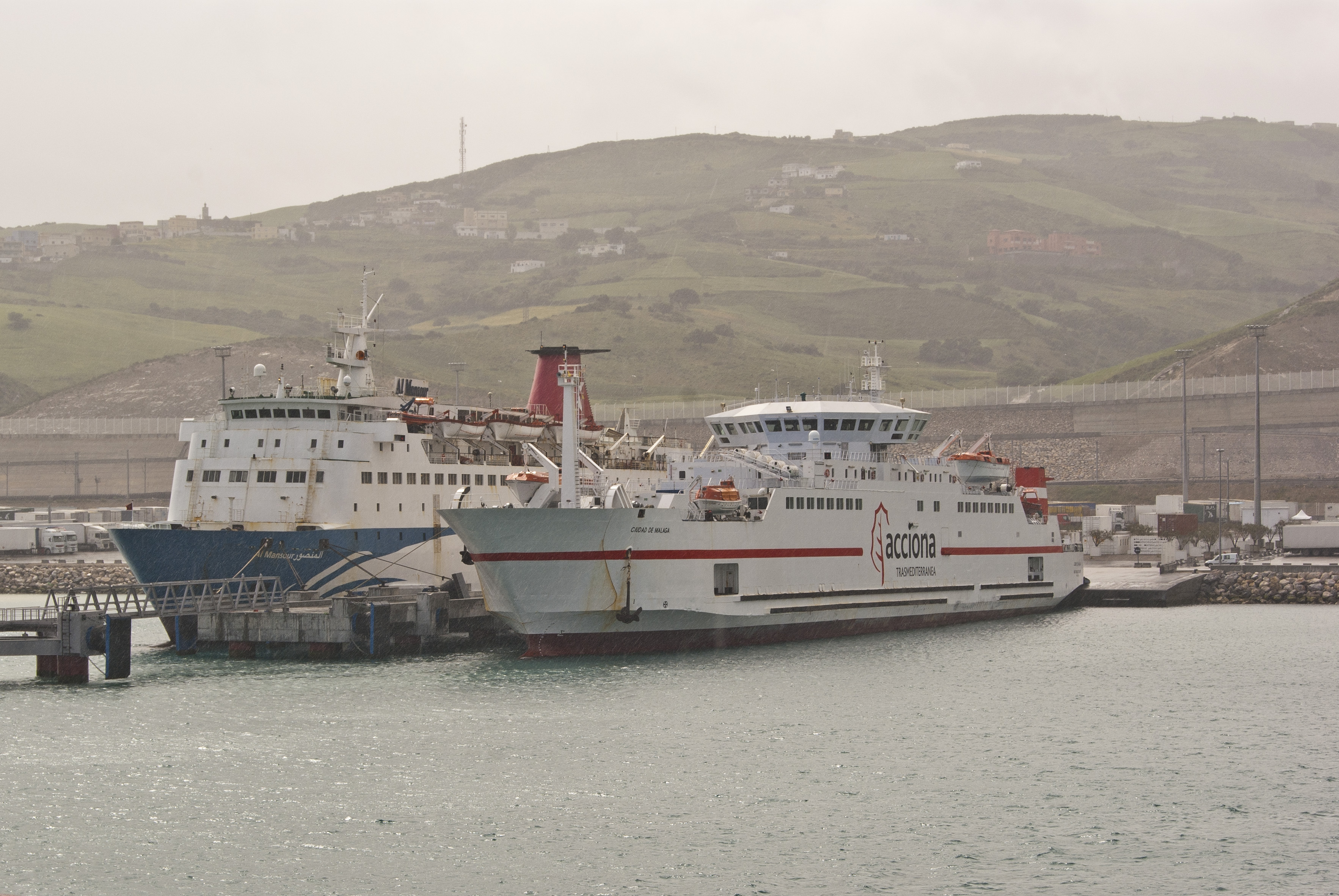
Ciudad de Málaga, at Tánger

As of 2018, Trasmediterránea owns and operates a large fleet of vessels, comprising 25 roro ferries, 1 high speed monohull and 3 high speed catamarans.

Name	Built	Enterered service	Service exit	Notes
Villa de Agaete	1999	2001		
Almariya	1981	2013		
Ciudad de Ibiza	2003	2003	2026	
Ciudad de Málaga	1998	1998		
José María Entrecanales	2010	2010		
Juan J. Sister	1993	1993		
Milenium Dos	2001	2003	2024	Sold to Liberty Lines and chartered to Fred. Olsen Express and renamed Barlovento Express
Super-Fast Levante	2001	2001		
Volcán de Tinamar	2011	2018		Chartered from Naviera Armas
Volcán de Tirajana	2006	2006		Chartered to Naviera Armas

=== Former ===
- Plus Ultra (1928–1977) Scrapped in Spain in 1977.
- La Palma (1930–1976) As a museum ship in Tenerife, Spain since 1986.
- Victoria (1952–1984) Scrapped in 1984.
- Virgen De Africa (1953–1986) Scrapped in 1992.
- Santa Maria De Las Nieves (1964–1982) Scrapped in 1992.
- Juan March (1966–1985) As Ocean Majesty since 1995.
- Santa Cruz De Tenerife (1966–1985) Scrapped in Aliağa, Turkey in 1987.
- Ciudad De Compostela (1967–1992) Sank as Saray Star while en route from Piraeus to Venice in 1994.
- Las Palmas De Gran Canaria (1967–1986) Scrapped as Royal Pacific at Taiwan in 2005.
- Antonio Larazo (1968–1988) Scrapped as Logos II at Aliağa, Turkey in 2008.
- Vicente Puchol (1969–1987) Scrapped as 7107 Island Cruise in Manila sometime in 2023/2024.
- Isla De Menorca (1971–1984) Scrapped at Aliağa, Turkey in 2004.
- J.J Sister (1975–1994) Scrapped at Aliağa, Turkey in 2005.
- Manuel Solo (1976–1992) Scrapped at Aliağa, Turkey in 2013.
- Ciudad De La Laguna (1975–1999) Scrapped in 2008.
- Villa De Agaete (1975–2002) Scrapped at Alang, India in 2008.
- Canguro Bruno (1978–1982) Scrapped at Aliağa, Turkey in 2001.
- Ciudad De Ceuta (1978–2001) Scrapped in 2001.
- Ciudad De Zaragoza (1978–1999) Scrapped at Cádiz, Spain in 2000.
- Ciudad De Badajoz (1979–2004) Scrapped as Nena at Alang, India in 2008.
- Ciudad De Sevilla (1980–2009) Scrapped as Sevilla in 2010.
- Ciudad De Santa Cruz De La Palma (1981–1998) Scrapped as Oriental Princess in Indonesia in 2014.
- Ciudad De Palma (1981–1982) Scrapped as Samundhar Sikharam at Aliağa, Turkey in 2009.
- Ciudad De Salamanca (1982–2007) Scrapped at Aliağa, Turkey in 2013.
- Ciudad De Valencia (1984–2009) Scrapped as Mary The Queen at Manila, Philippines in 2016.
- Bahia De Cadiz (1984–1985) Scrapped at Aliağa, Turkey in 2012.
- Scirocco (1987–1992) Scrapped at Alang, India in 2009.
- Marrajo (1989–2000) As Fiammeta M for Ustica Lines in 2000.
- Ciudad De Burgos (1990–2007) Sank near Istanbul, Turkey in 2004 one person on board died and 20 are missing.
- Cala Salada (1990–2000) As Mira since 2019.
- Cala Fustan (1990–2000) As Amazon since 2014.
- Princess Dacil (1990–2006) As Rocket 3 for a Japanese company since 2006.
- Santa De Cruz De Tenerife (1993–2012) as Seira for an Indonesian company since 2017.
- Alcantara (1995–2012) as Royal Star since 2012.
- Almundaina (1996–2008) as San Valentin since 2008.
- Ciudad De Tanger (1998–2002) as Zadar for Jadrolinjia since 2004.
- Super-Fast Andalucia (1999–2015) Scrapped as Eurocargo Trieste at Aliağa, Turkey in 2020.
- Super-Fast Canarias (1999–2015) Scrapped as Eurpcargo Patrasso at Aliağa, Turkey in 2021.
- Millenium (2000–2010) as Volcan De Teno for Naviera Armas since 2016.
- Alyssa (2000–2001) as Optima Seaways for DFDS since 2012.
- Murillo (2002–2014) as Cracovia for Polferries since 2017.
- Almudaina Dos (2005–2022) as Speedrunner Jet 2 for Greek company Seajets since 2022.
- Zurbaran (2006–2019) as Isle Of Inisheer for Irish Ferries since 2019.
- El Greco (2006–2007) as Finbo Cargo for Eckerö Line since 2019.
- Giulia D'Abundo (2007–2010) Scrapped as Abundo at Alang, India in 2010.
- Vronskiy (2008–2021) Scrapped as Damla at Aliağa, Turkey in 2021.
- Aegean Heaven (2008–2010) as Ayshe from 2014 to 2022. As DCL Qingdao since 2022.
- Albayzin (2010–2019) as Venezia for Grimaldi Lines since 2019.
- Tenacia (2011–2022) as Tenacia for Grandi Navi Veloci since 2022.
- Audacia (2008–2011) as Rizhao Orient for a Chinese company since 2014.
- Sherbatiskiy (2013–2015) Scrapped as Sher at Alang, India in 2015.
- Sorrento (2014–2015) A fire broke out when departure from Palma De Mallorca on 24 April 2015. The passengers survived. In 2016 the ship was scrapped at Aliağa, Turkey.
- Snav Adriatico (2015–2017) as GNV Blu for Grandi Navi Veloci since 2017.
- Forza (2016–2022) as Forza for Grandi Navi Veloci since 2022.
- Dimonios (2017–2021) as Ciudad De Palma for Grimaldi Euromed since 2021.
- Nura Nova (2017–2019) as Lady Carmela for Gestour since 2019.
- Villa De Teror (2019–2020) as Madeleine II for CTMA since 2020.
- Las Palmas de Gran Canaria (1993–2024) for Siremar since 2024.
- Alcantara Dos (2006-2023) as Nissos for Greek Saos ferries since 2023.
