= Naviera Armas =

Shipping company of Canarian origin, founded 1940

Naviera Armas, S.A.
- Industry: Maritime transport
- Founded: 1941; 85 years ago
- Founder: Antonio Armas Curbelo
- Headquarters: Las Palmas de Gran Canaria, Spain
- Areas served: Canary Islands; Alboran Sea; Huelva
- Website: www.navieraarmas.com

Naviera Armas is a Spanish company, founded in the 1940s, which operates a number of ferry services in Spain. The company mainly operates in the Canary Islands, with additional routes connecting the Canary Islands and the north African coast to the Spanish mainland. As of August 2019, the company operates a fleet of 11 ferries and 5 fast ferries.

== History ==
Naviera Armas was founded in 1941 in Lanzarote by Antonio Armas Curbelo. Its initial activities were dedicated to the inter-island transport of salt and freight using wooden-hull boats. With the years, the company included steel-hull ships in its fleet and expanded to the old province of Spanish Sahara.

In 1975, the company introduced the first roll-on/roll-off vessels in the Canary Islands. However, it was not until 1995 that the company began to offer passenger services.

2003 saw the beginning of a fleet renewal plan with the arrival of the Volcán de Tindaya.

In 2008, the company started offering services to Portimão, Portugal with a stopover on the Portuguese island of Madeira. However, in 2013, the service to Madeira was abruptly withdrawn due to a dispute over harbour fees. Services resumed in the summer of 2018 as a seasonal offering between 2 July and 20 September, being operated by Grupo Sousa using Naviera Armas's ship Volcán de Tijarafe, which provided the crossing prior to the 2013 discontinuation. With a maximum speed of 23 knots, the crossing was scheduled to take 24 hours. In the summer of 2019, this service was provided using the ship Volcán de Timanfaya.

In August 2025, Baleària announced it would take over both Naviera Armas and Trasmediterranea. This was subject to approval from the National Commission on Markets and Competition (CNMC) of Spain. The CNMC approved the deal in March 2026.

In May 2026, Baleària took over the operations in the Canary Islands under the Baleària Canarias brand.

== Fleet ==
Naviera Armas operates a fleet of eleven ferries and five fast ferries. The fast ferries were acquired as a response to competition from rival Canary Islands ferry company Fred. Olsen Express, which operates an entirely high speed fleet.

Not all of the ships operated by Armas are owned by the company. Those owned by Armas follow the company's naming convention: "Volcán de" followed by a name starting with the letter T.

Ferries operated by Naviera Armas
Name	Built	Entered service	Tonnage	Notes	Source
Volcán de Taburiente	2006	2006	12,895 GT	Sold in 2023 to Greek company Golden Star Ferries and renamed Andros King.	
Volcán de Tamadaba	2007	2007	19,976 GT	Las Palmas de Gran Canaria - Arrecife	
Volcán de Tamasite	2004	2004	17,343 GT	Las Palmas de Gran Canaria - Morro Jable	
Volcán de Tauce	1995	1995	9,667 GT	Algeciras - Tanger Med	
Volcán de Teneguía	1997	1997	11,197 GT	Gran Canaria - Tenerife - Huelva	
Volcán de Timanfaya	2005	2005	17,343 GT	Arrecife - Las Palmas de Gran Canaria - Santa Cruz de Tenerife	
Volcán de Tindaya	2003	2003	3,715 GT	Corralejo - Playa Blanca. Entered service in 2003. Crossing time 35 mins.	
Volcán del Tinamar	2011	2011	29,757 GT	Huelva - Tenerife - Gran Canaria	

Fast ferries operated by Naviera Armas
Name	Built	Enterered service	Tonnage	Notes	Source
Villa de Agaete	1999	2014	6.346 GT	Incat Hull 052. Timechartered to Naviera Armas, Los Cristianos - Puerto de la Estaca	
Volcán de Tirajana	2002	2015	6,581 GT	Incat Hull 062, 98 x 26 metres, 35 knots operational speed. 900 passengers, 287 cars	
Volcán de Teno	2000	2016	6,360 GT	Incat Hull 056. 96 x 27 metres, 38 knots (70 kmh) service speed. 966 passengers, 290 cars. / Motril-Al Hoceïma (NOVEMBER 2017, laid up in Cadiz)	
Volcán de Tagoro	July 2019	August 2019	10,800 GT	Incat 091. 111 x 31 metres, 35 knots operational speed, 1184 pass (155 business class), 390 cars. Cost €74 million	
Volcán de Taidia	2021	2021	10,800 GT	Incat 093. 111 x 31 metres, 35 knots operational, same class of ship as Volcan de Tagoro	.

== Photo gallery ==
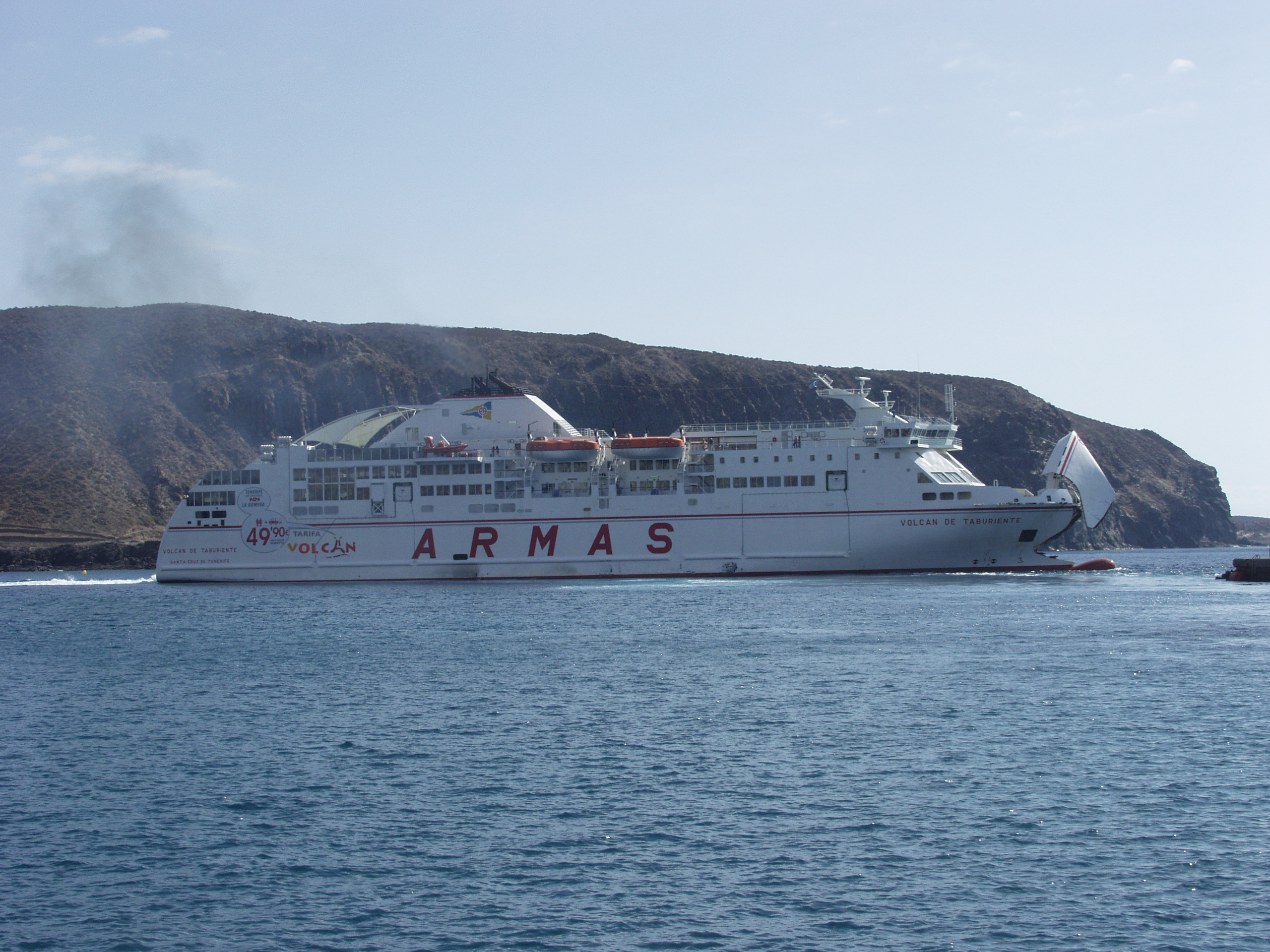
Ferry leaving Los Cristianos

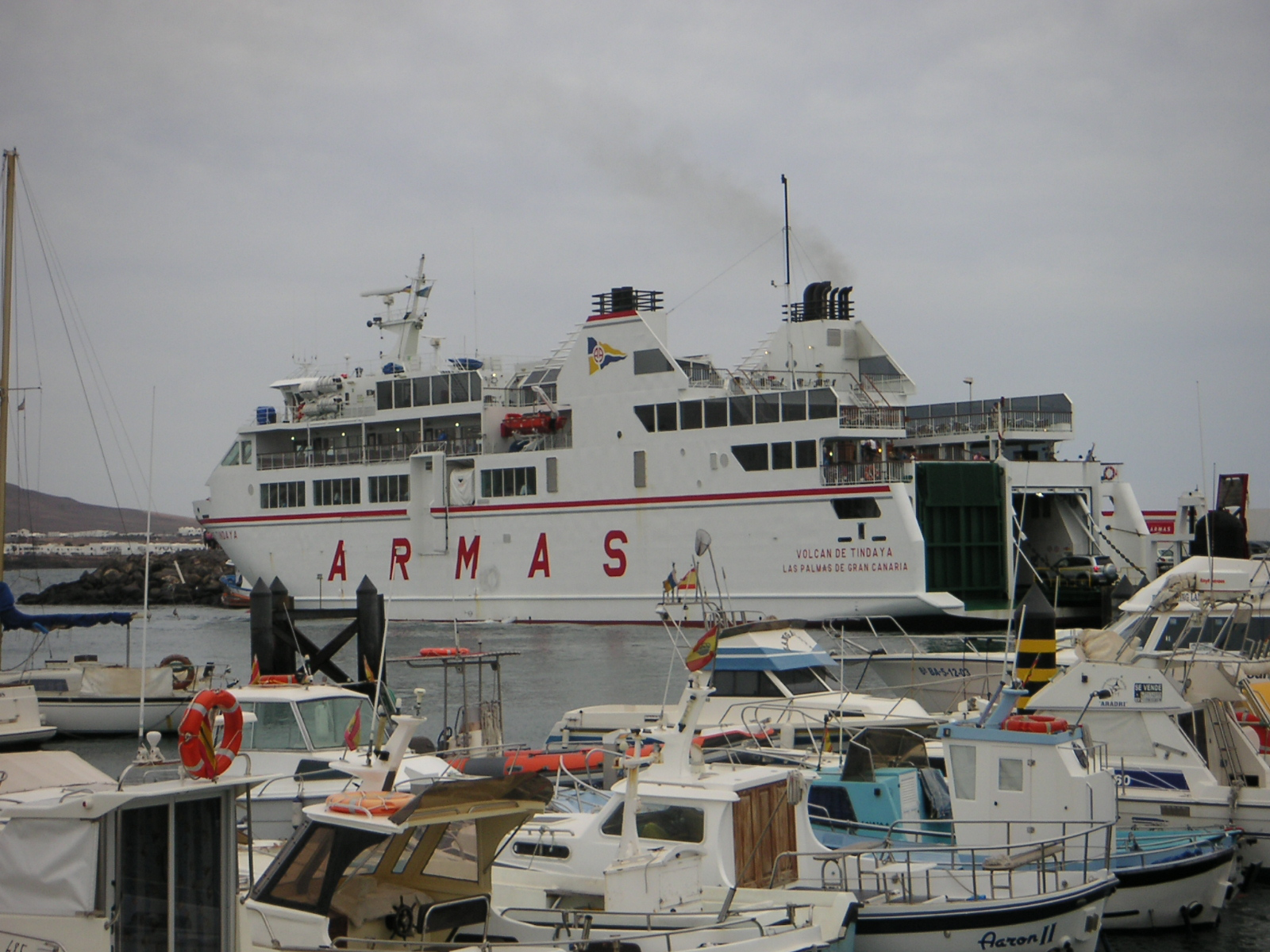
Ferry at Playa Blanca

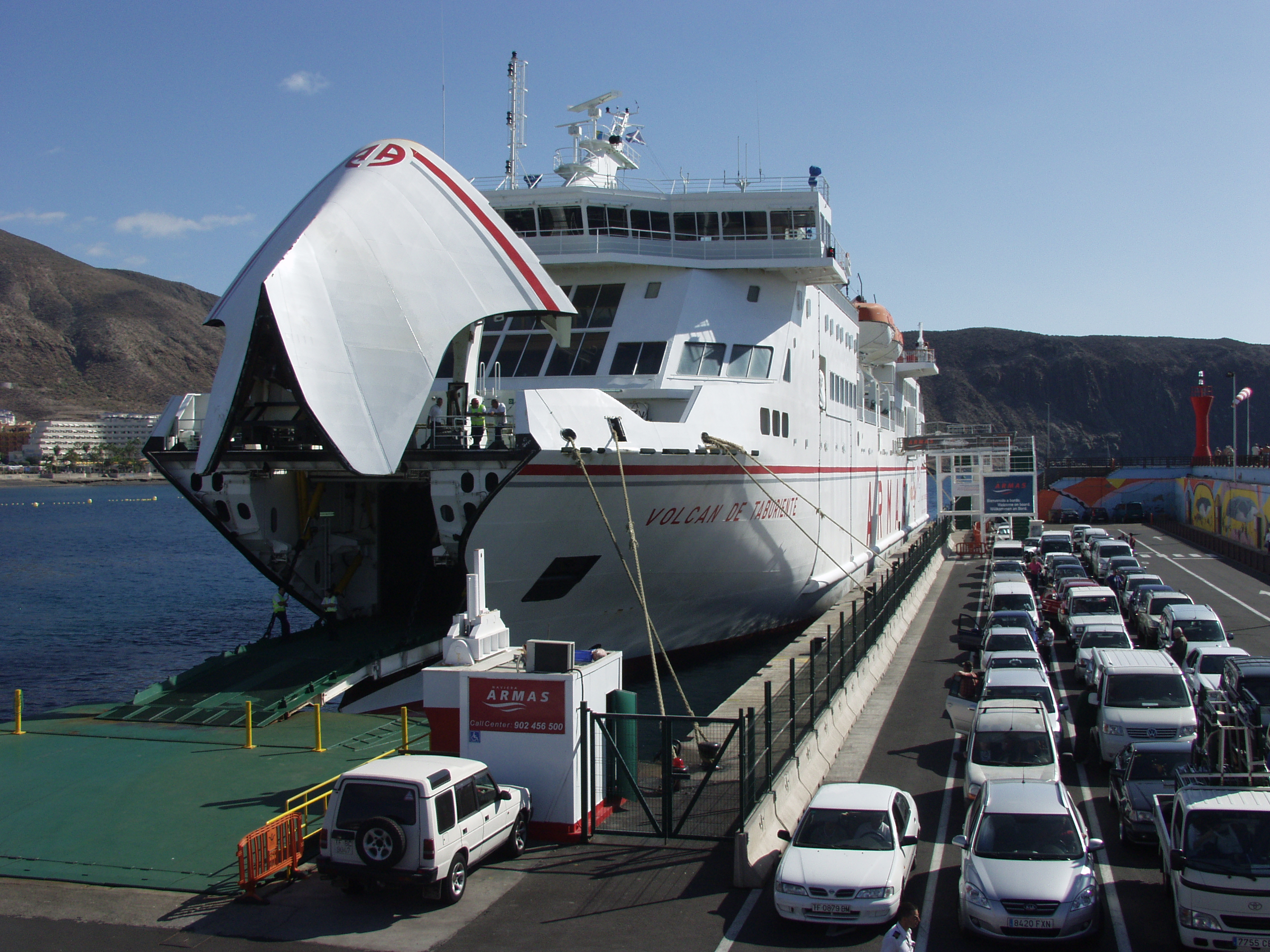
Ferry in Los Cristianos

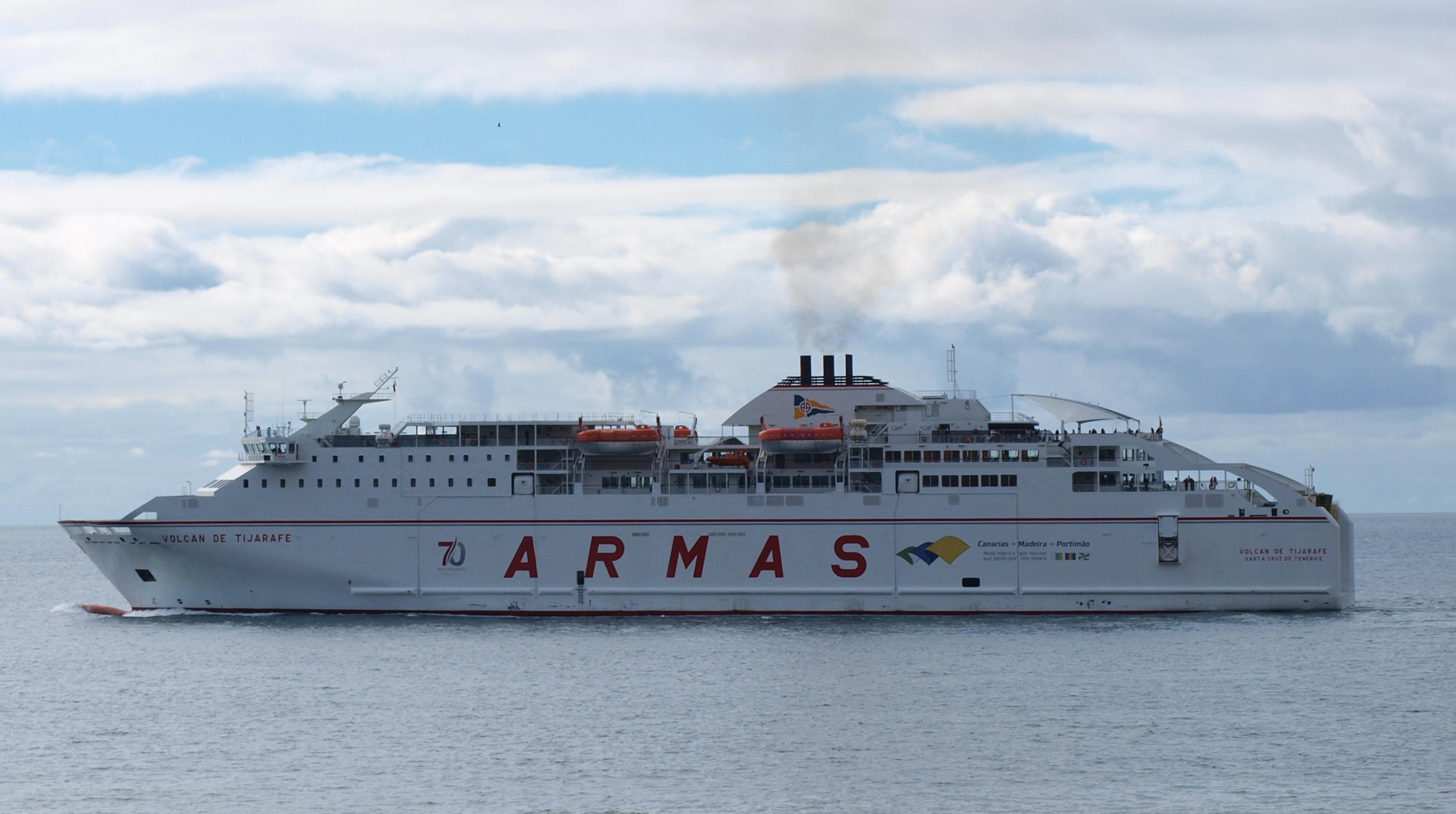
Volcan de Tijarafe leaving Funchal

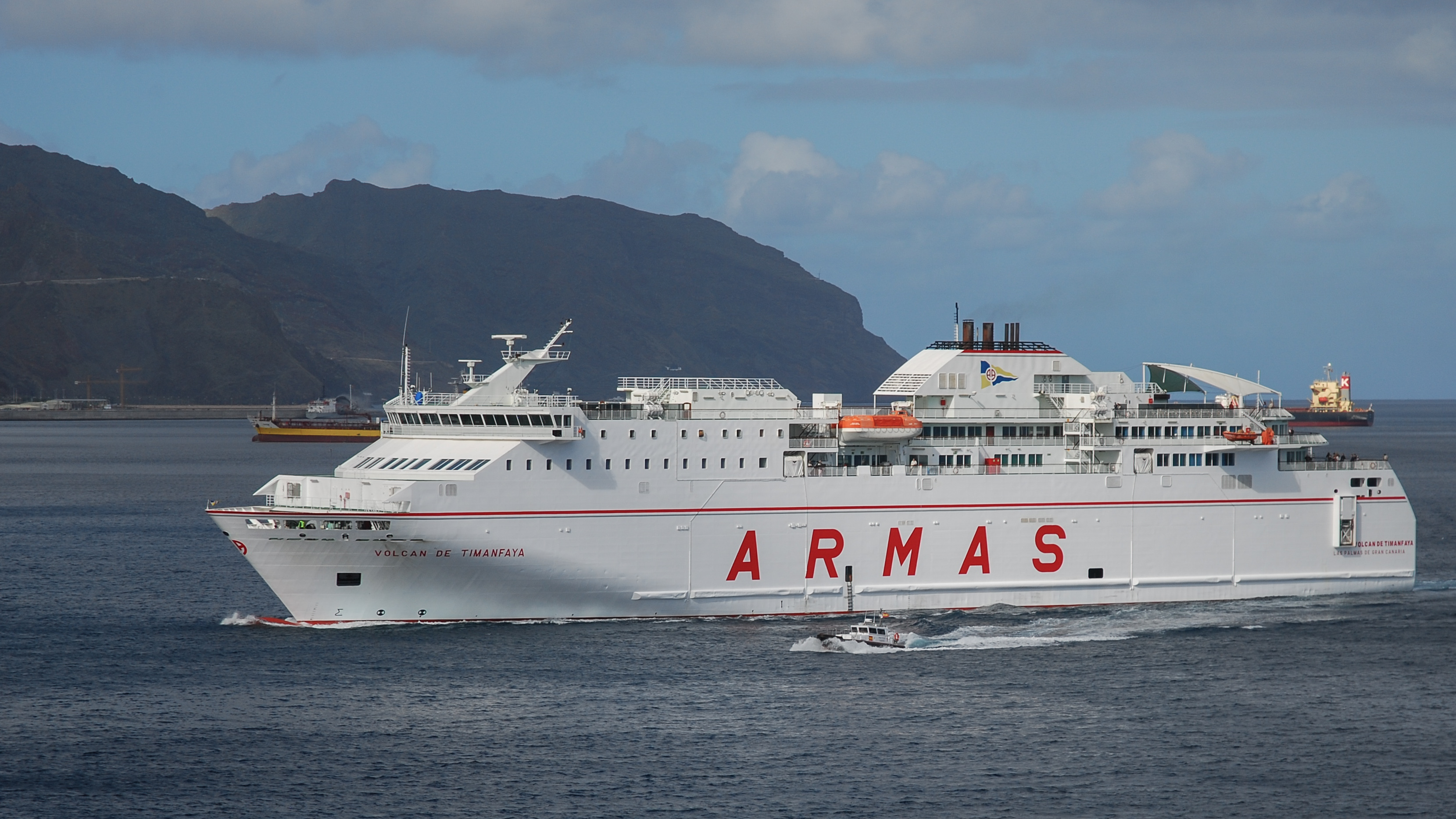
Volcan de Timanfaya near Tenerife

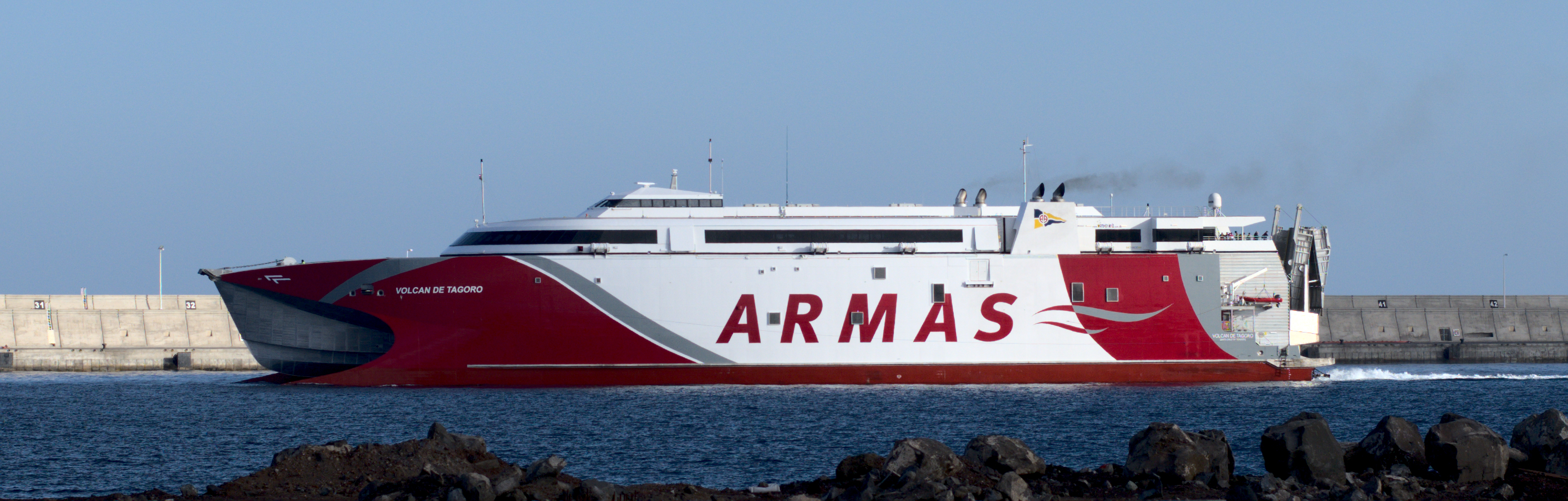
Volcan de Tagoro entering Las Palmas
