= Volcán de Tagoro =

Incat catamaran operated by Naviera Armas

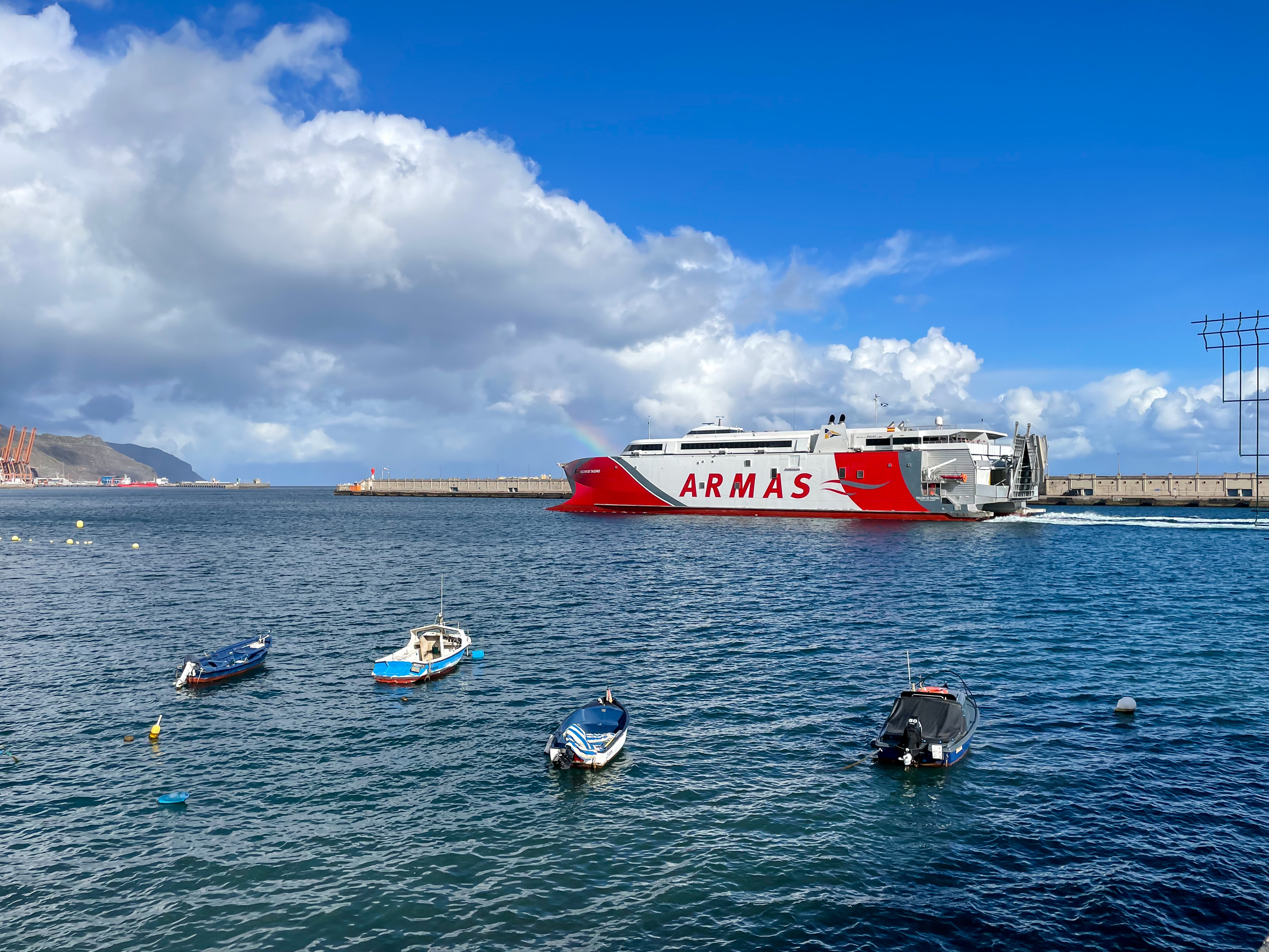
- Volcán de Tagoro in Tenerife

History

Spain
- Name: Volcán de Tagoro
- Owner: 2019–2026 Naviera de Bentayga SL; 2026–present: Baleària
- Operator: 2019–2026: Naviera Armas; 2026–present: Baleària
- Port of registry: Santa Cruz de Tenerife
- Route: Las Palmas de Gran Canaria - Santa Cruz de Tenerife
- Ordered: 17 March 2017
- Builder: Incat Tasmania Pty. Ltd.
- Cost: €74 million
- Yard number: 91
- Laid down: 17 November 2017
- Launched: 15 June 2019
- Completed: 16 July 2019
- Maiden voyage: 15 August 2019
- Identification: Call sign: EBSB; IMO number: 9830111; MMSI number: 224781000; DNV ID: 37910
- Status: In service
- Notes: Car ferry / catamaran

General characteristics
- Tonnage: 10,870 GT
- Length: 111 m (364 ft)
- Beam: 30.5 m (100 ft)
- Draught: 4.16 m (13.6 ft)
- Decks: 1 passenger deck; 2 vehicle decks
- Installed power: 4 × MAN Energy Solutions 20V28/33D, 9100 kW each
- Propulsion: 4 × Wärtsilä LJX 1500 waterjets
- Speed: 35 kn (65 km/h; 40 mph)
- Capacity: 1184 passengers; 390 cars
- Crew: 16

Volcán de Tagoro is a catamaran fast ferry operated by the Spanish shipping company Baleària under its Baleària Canarias division, between the Canary Islands of Gran Canaria and Tenerife in the Atlantic Ocean. The ship's construction was completed in July 2019 and it commenced operations a month later with Naviera Armas, joining the two Canarian capitals, Las Palmas de Gran Canaria and Santa Cruz de Tenerife, in just over an hour and a half.

== Name ==
Volcán de Tagoro follows the usual Naviera Armas naming convention, consisting of 'Volcán de' (Spanish for 'volcano') followed by a name starting with the letter T. In this particular case, the ship is named after the Tagoro submarine volcano, which erupted south of the island of El Hierro in 2011. After the ship's delivery in Australia, and during the final stint of the 25-day journey to the Canary Islands, the Volcán de Tagoro sailed directly above the Tagoro submarine volcano, paying tribute to its namesake.

== Design and construction ==
The Volcán de Tagoro was built in Hobart, Australia by Incat. The vessel is 111 metres (364 ft) long, 30.5 metres (100 ft) wide, and has a draught of 4.16 metres (13.6 ft). It has a service speed of 35 knots (65 km/h; 40 mph), although it can reach speeds of 42.4 knots (78.5 km/h; 48.8 mph).

The vessel is powered by four MAN Energy Solutions 20V28/33D diesel engines, each capable of providing 9100 kW of power. The diesel engines drive four Wärtsilä LJX 1500 waterjet propellers. The electrical energy is generated by four Scania DI13 generator sets.

The ship can transport up to 1184 passengers on the third deck in first class, business class and economy class lounges. The third deck also houses bars and food service areas, a gift shop and toilets. The first and second decks are used for vehicle transport and have a total capacity for 219 cars and 595 metres (1,952 ft) of truck lane; the latter can be used as additional car spaces, allowing for a total of 401 cars. The second deck also houses crew accommodation.

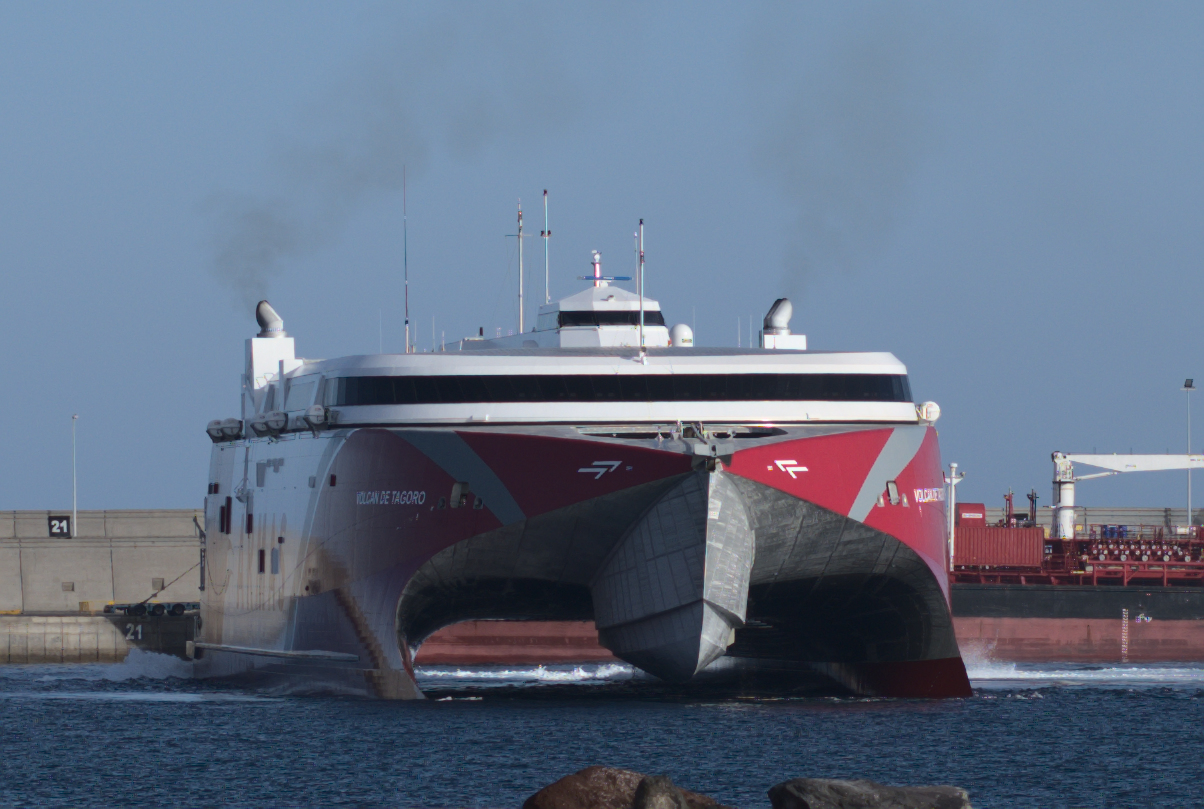
Volcan de Tagoro in Las Palmas
