= Los Cristianos =

- Town
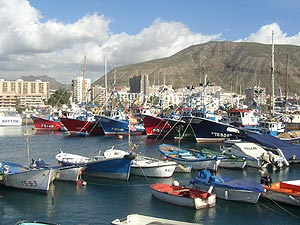
- Los Cristianos harbor

- Location of the town in Tenerife
- Coordinates: 28°03′N 16°43′W
- Country: Spain
- Autonomous community: Canary Islands
- Province: Santa Cruz de Tenerife
- Island: Tenerife
- Municipality: Arona
- Time zone: UTC0 (WET)
  - Summer (DST): UTC+1 (WEST)

Los Cristianos is a town in Spain with a population of 21,235 (2017), situated on the south coast of the Canary Island of Tenerife. Located in the municipality of Arona between the cone of the mountain Chayofita and the greater mountain Guaza. The town centre is around the Los Cristianos bay, but is rapidly expanding inland with modern development. The town is a popular tourist resort and includes a ferry port and two beaches.

Unlike its bustling neighbour, Playa de las Américas, this town has a history that predates the tourist boom of the 1970s and 1980s. For many years this holiday hub was a quiet fishing village and evidence of its humble origins can still be seen in the typical Canarian architecture of the older buildings. Since the rise in popularity of tourism to the area, the town has grown and now hosts many hotels, holiday resorts, bars and restaurants. The ferry port serves as a base for excursions such as dolphin and whale watching and game fishing.

== History ==
Historical references to Los Cristianos date back to the 16th century, when it is described as a harbour by the notary Hernán Guerra. Los Cristianos remained an important port for the south of Tenerife throughout the 17th, 18th and 19th centuries but remained unsettled until the latter part of the 19th century due to the threat of pirate raids as there was no significant population to warrant a castle or fort.

The first permanent settlement of Los Cristianos was in the 1860s when it was described by Pedro de Olive as "a hamlet in Arona, with three one-storey houses, a two-storey house and a hut." It was officially recognised in governmental documents as being established in 1888 by 29 houses and a cave.

The population of Los Cristianos started to grow around the turn of the century with the advent of industry and trade. With the threat from pirates and privateers now a distant memory, Los Cristianos, with its natural harbour thrived as the import-export centre of the south of Tenerife. In 1909, the first quay was built to ship the produce of a local distillery. It still remains today and is known as "El Puerto Viejo" (Old Quay). Other industries at the time included a resin factory, nearby salt mines and a fish salting factory.

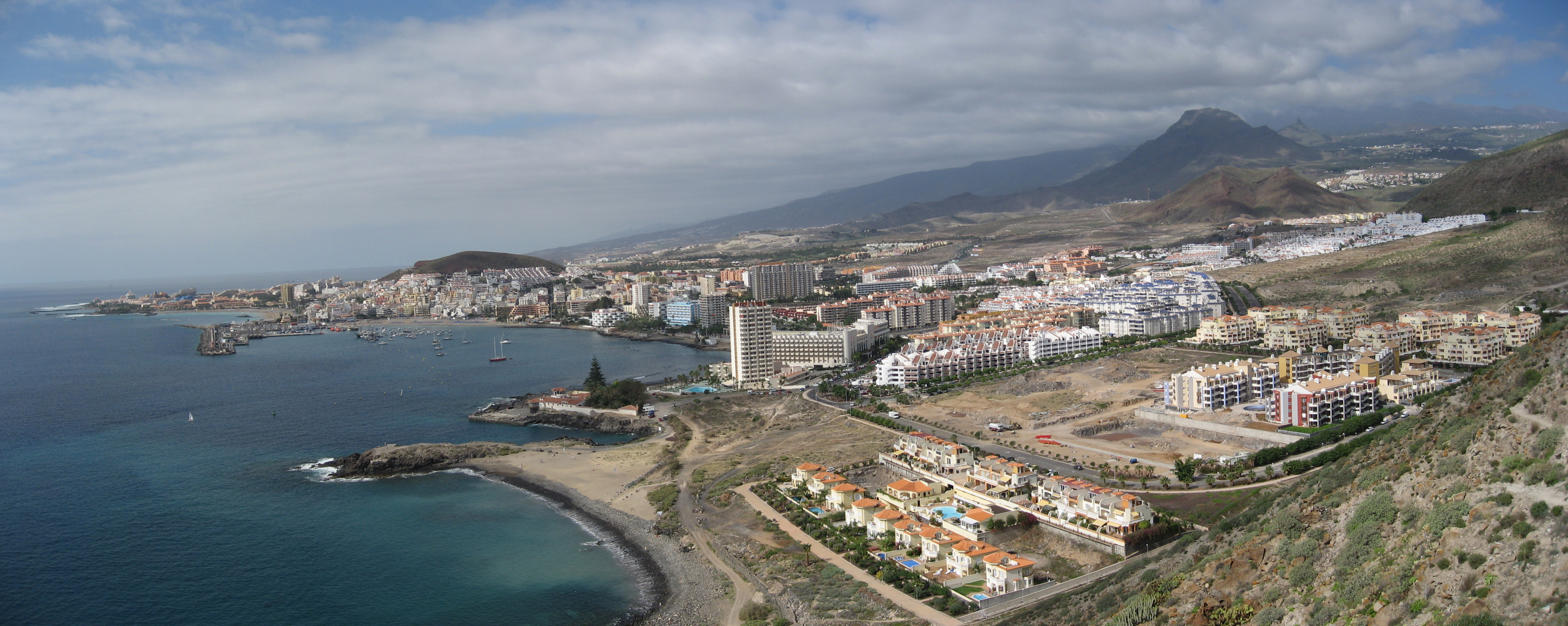
Panoramic view of the port

Agriculture didn't feature in the local economy until the land was irrigated by Teofílo Bello Rodríguez who in 1914 was authorized to run a pipe from his land in Vilaflor to land owned by his father in Los Cristianos. This fuelled further economic expansion, with the planting of tomato and banana crops, which required new labour to work the plantations.

In 1924 the growing population had growing spiritual as well as economic needs, so the residents commissioned the construction of the Chapel of Our Lady of Mount Carmel. The chapel was demolished in 1987 and new larger parish church built was in its place in the centre of Los Cristianos.

In 1934 a larger port was constructed in the bay of Los Cristianos, which could accommodate larger ships, allowed for the development of fishing, and increased the importance of commercial shipping. A new and bigger port was built on the same site in 1975 and saw the inauguration of a daily ferry service between Los Cristianos and the neighbouring island of La Gomera.

Around the time of World War II, a number of fortifications were built, with at least three small bunkers along the Los Cristianos coastline, possibly as defences against a planned British invasion. During World War II Spain was officially neutral, but considered Axis-friendly, as the Nazis had financed the phalangist victory in the Spanish Civil War. Some of these fortifications remain intact today.

Since 2015, the town of Los Cristianos is the headquarters of the Islamic Federation of the Canary Islands, which is the organization that brings together associations and Muslim communities of the Canary Islands.

== Tourism ==
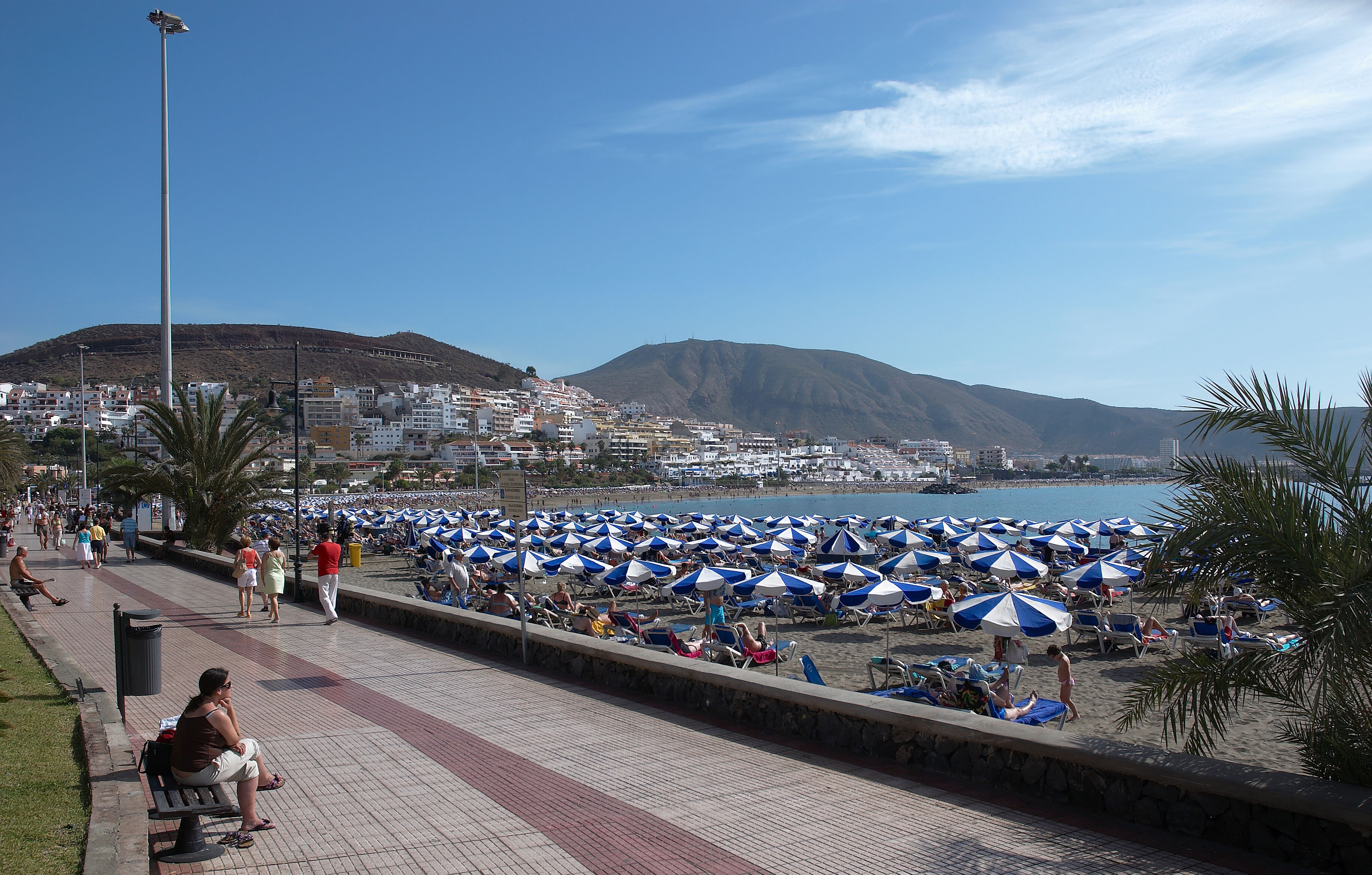
The famed beaches attract tourists year-round.

A Swedish man, Bengt Rylander (known locally as Don Benito), came to Los Cristianos in 1956 suffering from multiple sclerosis, hoping the warm climate and clean air would help ease his ailments. He convalesced well and spread the word of the mild and sunny climate he had discovered to his friends in Sweden and, since he was formerly a writer and TV commentator, word spread quickly. In 1957 he was joined by several friends who suffered from poliomyelitis and rheumatic diseases.

So the origins of tourism in Los Cristianos during the late 1950s and early 1960s are as a resort for ailing & convalescent Swedes. These unlikely pioneers have left their mark on the town, with the main high-street in Los Cristianos known as "Avenida de Suecia" (Avenue of Sweden) and the "Casa Sueca", now a Swedish Lutheran Church, located on the seafront.

Tourism was not limited to the Swedes, growing numbers of visitors from other European countries. The 1960s saw the construction of the first large buildings in Los Cristianos to house the growing number of tourists, these included Cristianmar, Rosamar and the four-star Oasis Moreque Hotel. The steady number of disabled Swedish visitors also led to the opening of the Vintersol public rehabilitation clinic in 1965. Some old photos of Los Cristianos in the early days can be seen in the Hotel Princesa Dacil close to the beach. There are many old photos from the late 1960s and early 1970s in construction on display.

Whilst tourist numbers in Los Cristianos grew steadily in the 1960s and 1970s, it was only after the inauguration of the new International Airport in the south of Tenerife (Reina Sofía) in autumn 1978 that tourism really began to boom in the south of the island.

A number of huge hotels and apartment blocks were built during the 1970s to house the growing number of tourists and workers, but it was in the 1980s when the town began to expand massively. As well as holiday makers, Los Cristianos began to attract a number of British expatriates who emigrated either permanently or semi-permanently to escape the cold British winters. As English is as widely spoken as Spanish, there are also a number of British owned bars, restaurants, shops and services aimed predominantly at the tourist sector.

== Beaches ==
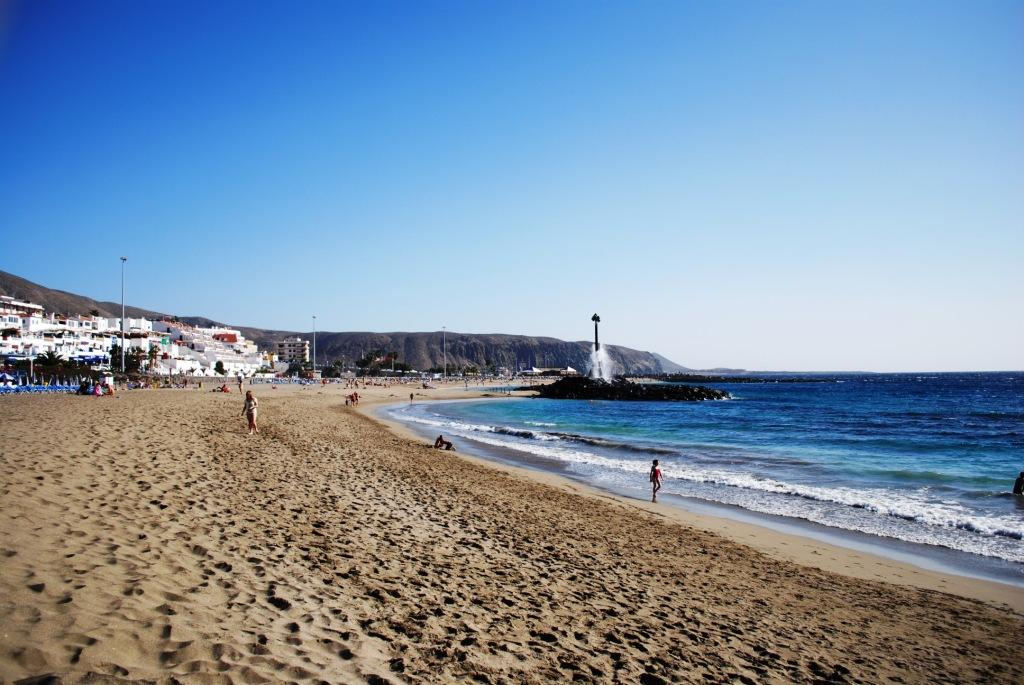
One of the beaches beside Los Cristianos: Las Vistas

Los Cristianos is home to two popular beaches: The main beach (Playa de Los Cristianos) is a sandy beach sheltered by the Harbour and boasts a number of facilities including watersports, beach volley ball, showers and a children's play area. Las Vistas Beach is located in the next bay beyond the harbour and is man-made, protected by break-waters, it also boasts a number of facilities including watersports, showers and a tourist information site. In December 2008 the Los Cristianos promenade, which was originally constructed back in the seventies, was given a facelift.

There is also a rocky, black-sand beach in the "Rincón" area of Los Cristianos, (between the headland near the Puerto Viejo and the cliffs of Montaña Guaza.)

== Economy ==
Nowadays Los Cristianos is a busy tourist resort, attracting hundreds of thousands of visitors each year. Dozens of hotels and self-catering holiday apartments are available; many can be booked direct or through major tour operators. Tourism related industries are the main employer in Los Cristianos.

Los Cristianos is also home to a plethora of bars and restaurants of varying styles, from 'tapas' bars to high quality local and international cuisine. Eating out is inexpensive; so many visitors opt for half-board or self-catering accommodation.

As a consequence of the tourism boom agriculture went into terminal decline and the last banana crop was harvested in the early 1990s. A small fishing fleet still operates from the harbour, but commercial shipping has all but been replaced with pleasure cruises and ferry services to the neighbouring islands of La Gomera, El Hierro and La Palma.

Los Cristianos is also a major commercial centre for the south of Tenerife, with a vibrant high-street offering a range of small stores, catering for both tourists and residents alike. There are a number of small shopping malls as well as a number of major national-chain supermarkets.

Los Cristianos is also rapidly replacing Arona as the administrative centre of the south of Tenerife, with its own "Centro Cultural" which takes on many of the roles of the town-hall and Los Cristianos is also home to the "Juzgados de Arona" (County Courts).

== Transport ==
Los Cristianos is connected via the TF1 Motorway to the island's capital city Santa Cruz de Tenerife, and to the Tenerife South Airport. The town has its own bus terminal with regular services to other parts of the island. Daily ferry services to the neighbouring islands of La Gomera, El Hierro and La Palma also leave from the harbour of Los Cristianos operated by the Naviera Armas and Fred Olsen Express ferry companies. The Fred. Olsen Express firm has replaced the route which was previously operated by low-cost ferry start-up Garajonay Express who went bankrupt in 2008.

The town itself is best explored by foot, as it has a number of wheelchair-friendly pedestrian walkways and a long beachfront promenade. Taxis are readily available within the town. The port area of Los Cristianos is in first place in Spain in terms of passenger traffic through its links with the ports of San Sebastian de La Gomera, La Estaca in El Hierro and Santa Cruz de La Palma.

== Photo gallery ==
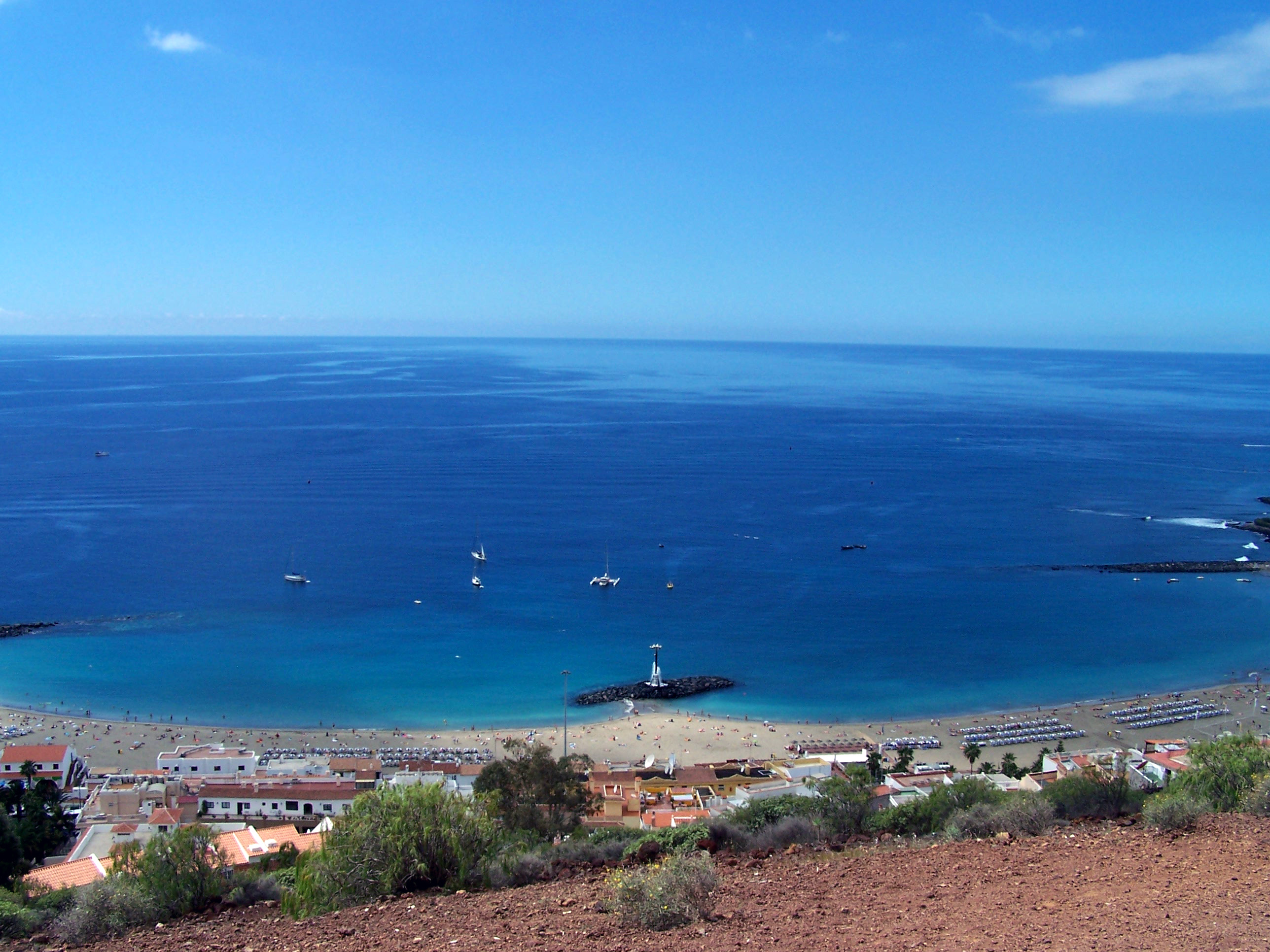
Los Cristianos

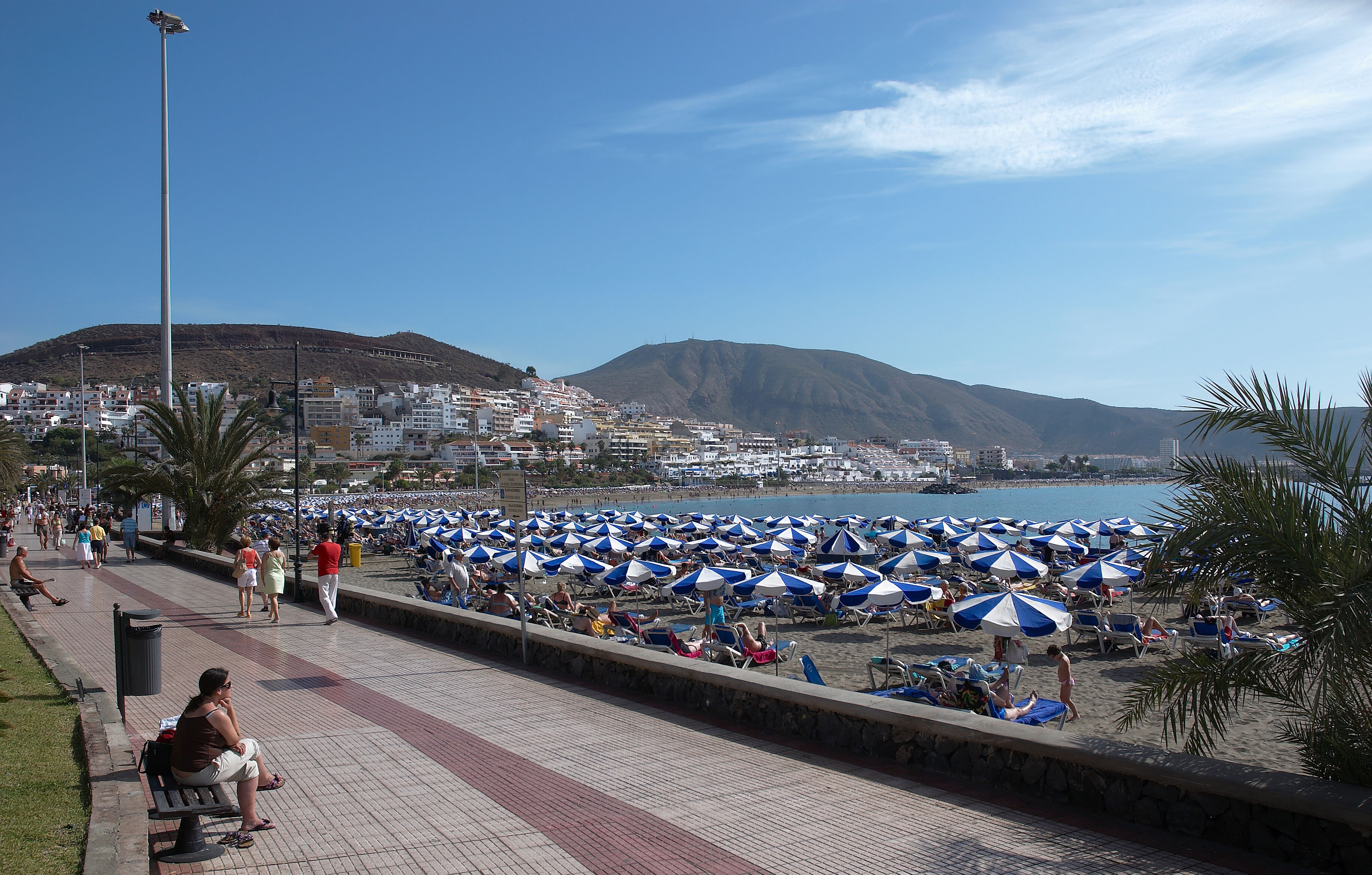
Main Beach

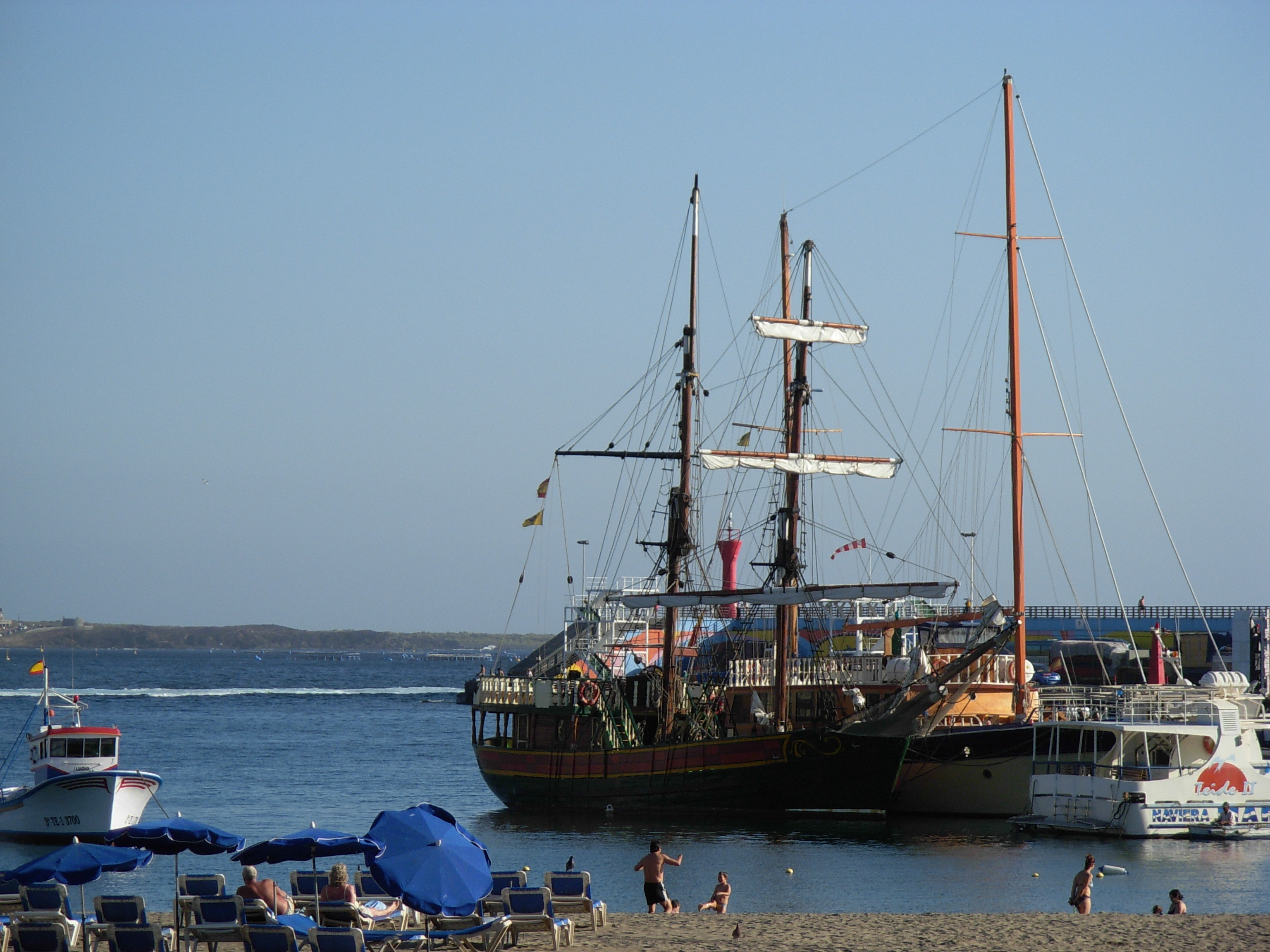
Sailing ships in Harbour

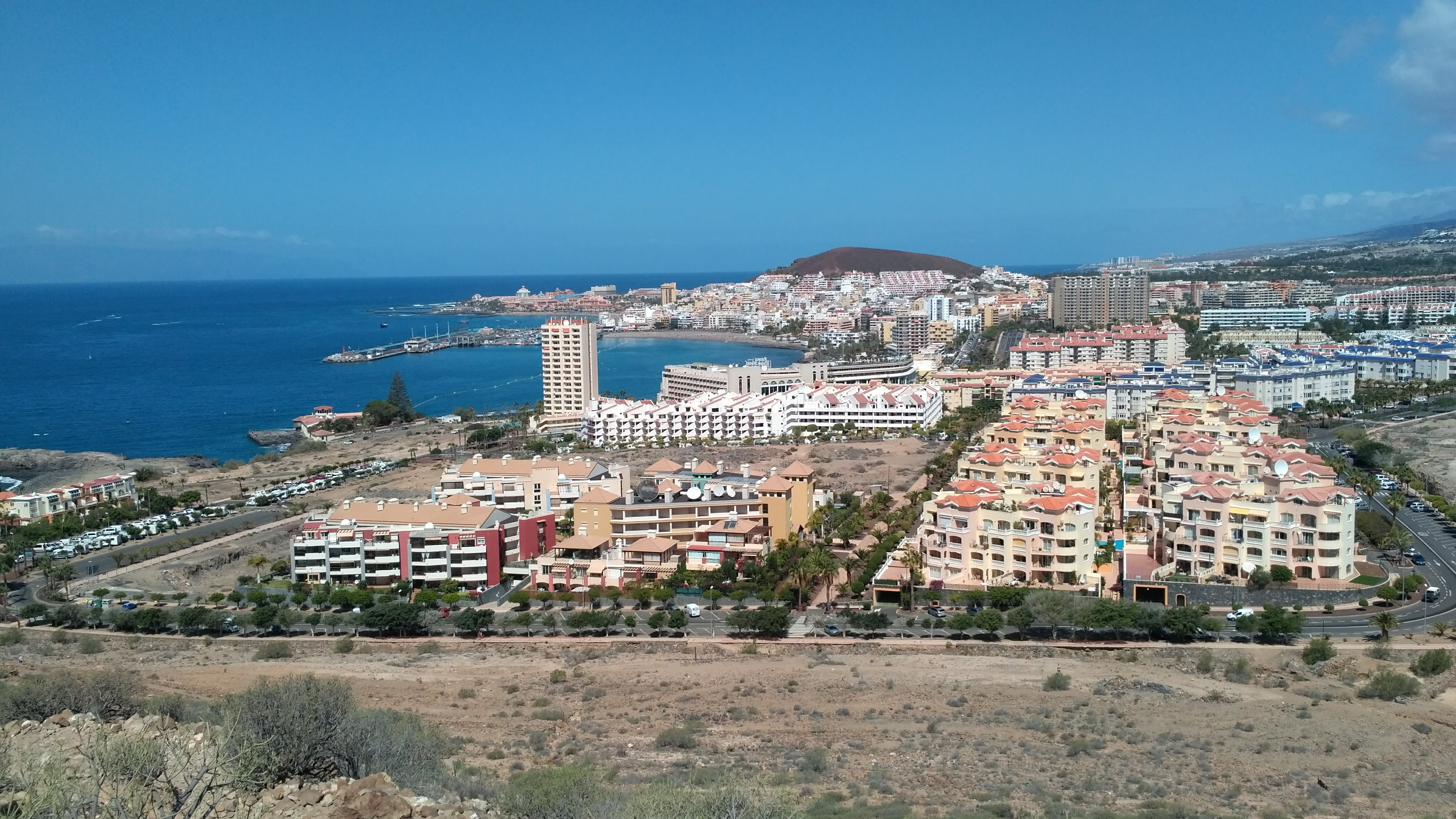
Panoramic View

== Sources ==
- Pedro de Olive Diccionario estadístico-administrativos de las Islas Canarias. 1865.
- Nelson Díaz Frías History of Los Cristianos. 2004
