= T&T Spirit =

Ferry in Trinidad and Tobago

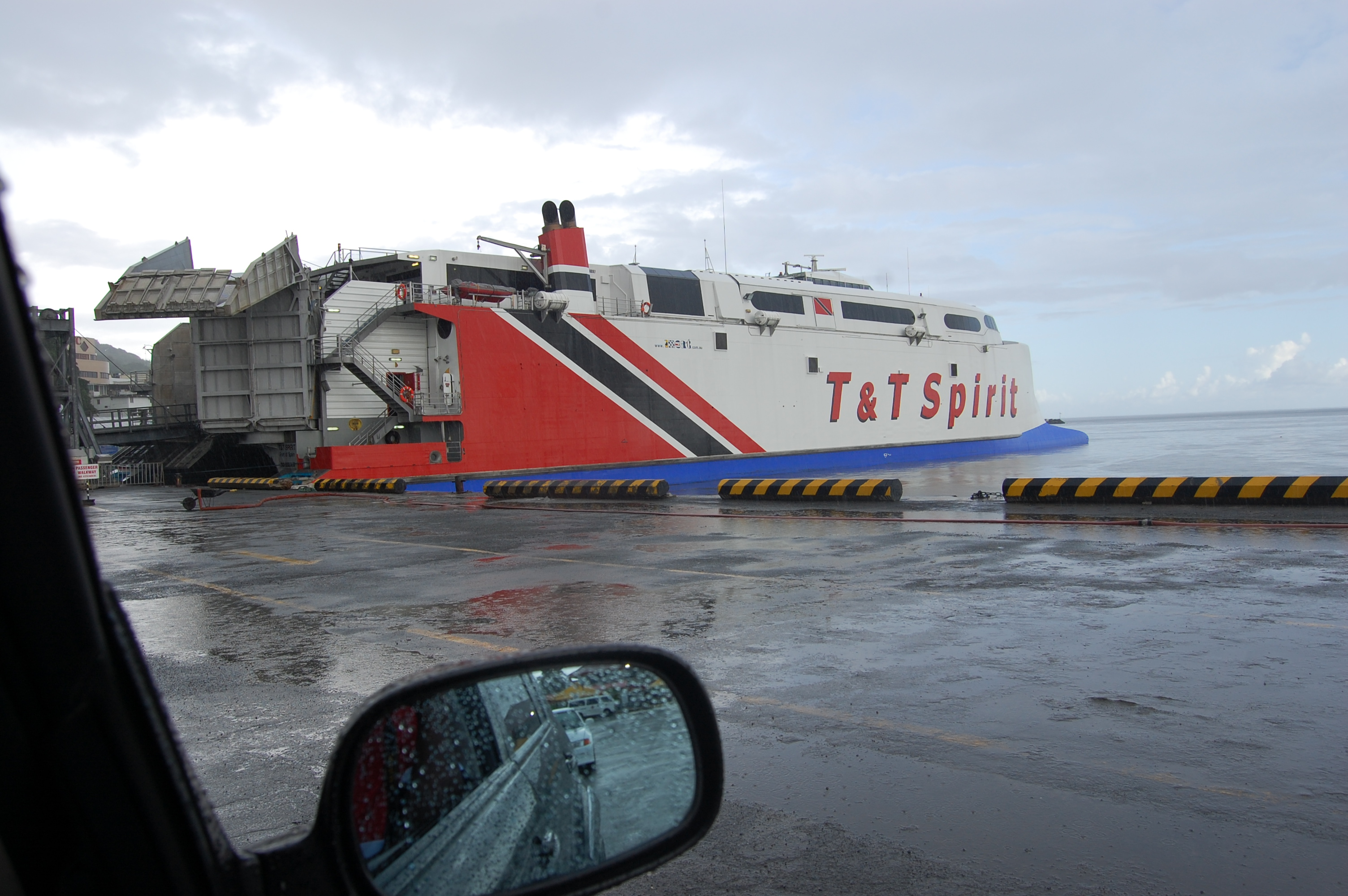
- T&T Spirit

History

Trinidad and Tobago
- Operator: 2002–2005: TACOM, United States Army; 2005–2006: Laid up / Conversion; 2006–present: Bay Ferries (on behalf of T&T government)
- Route: 2006–present: Port of Spain – Scarborough
- Builder: Incat, Tasmania, Australia
- Yard number: 060
- Launched: 2002
- Renamed: Incat 060 (construction); Spearhead (TSV-1X) (2002–2005); T&T Spirit (2006–present)
- Home port: Port of Spain
- Identification: IMO number: 9280897; MMSI number: 362029000; Callsign: 9YGS
- Status: In service

General characteristics
- Tonnage: 6,558 GT
- Length: 97.22 m (319.0 ft)
- Beam: 26.6 m (87.3 ft)
- Speed: 42 knots (service), 46.5 knots (maximum)
- Capacity: 765 passengers; 200 vehicles

T&T Spirit is a fast ferry operated by the government of Trinidad and Tobago.

Launched in 2002, she was initially built as a civilian ferry, but was converted for military use in the final stages of construction. She served from 2002 to 2005 with the United States Army's Tank-Automotive and Armaments Command (TACOM) as the first Theater Support Vessel (TSV). During this period she was designated USAV Spearhead (TSV-1X). Following military service, she was converted for civilian passenger and vehicle ferry service with the Trinidad and Tobago government on the Port of Spain – Scarborough route along with the T&T Express (HSC Incat 046).

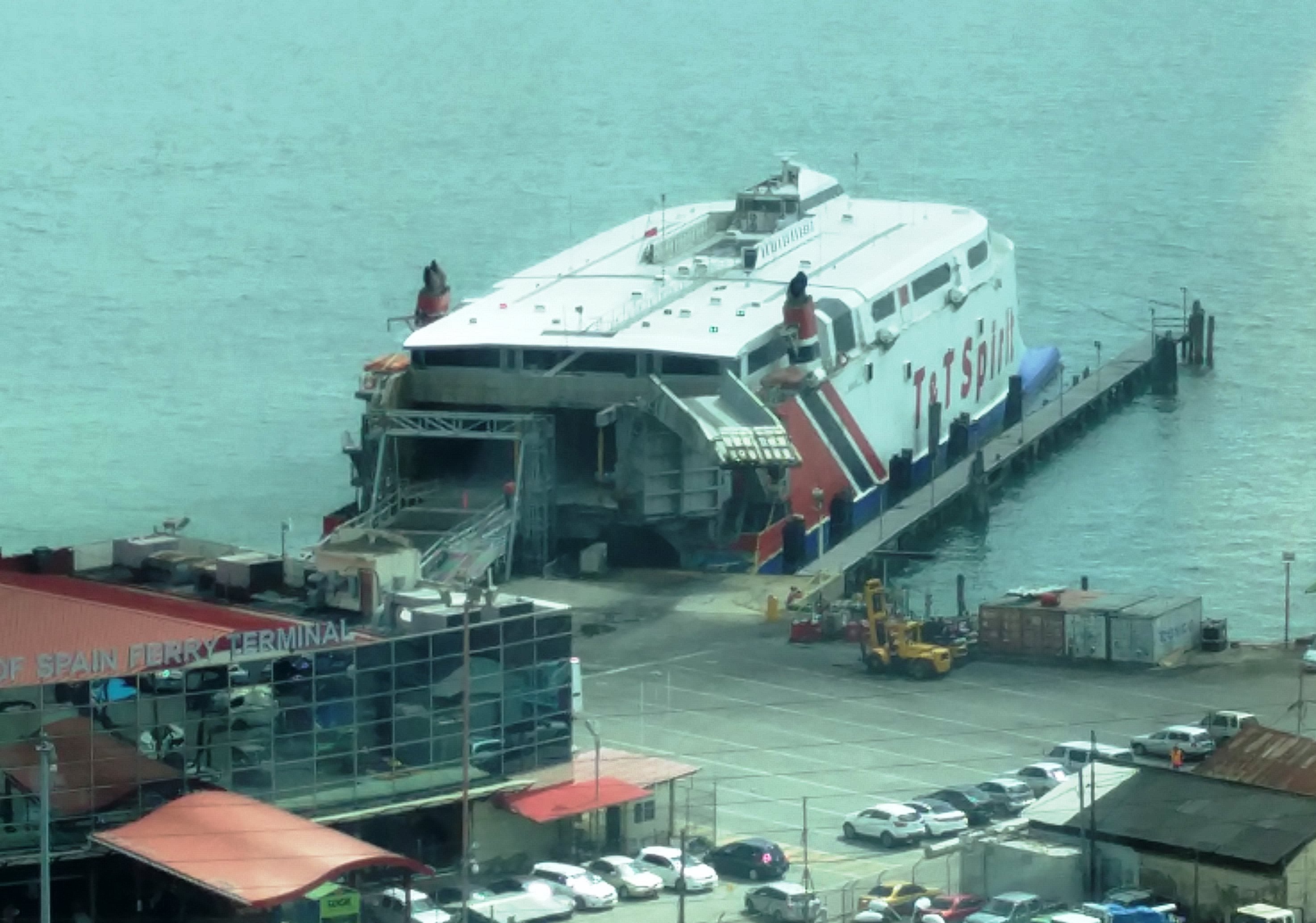
TT Spirit docked in Port of Spain harbour

== USAV Spearhead (TSV-1X) ==
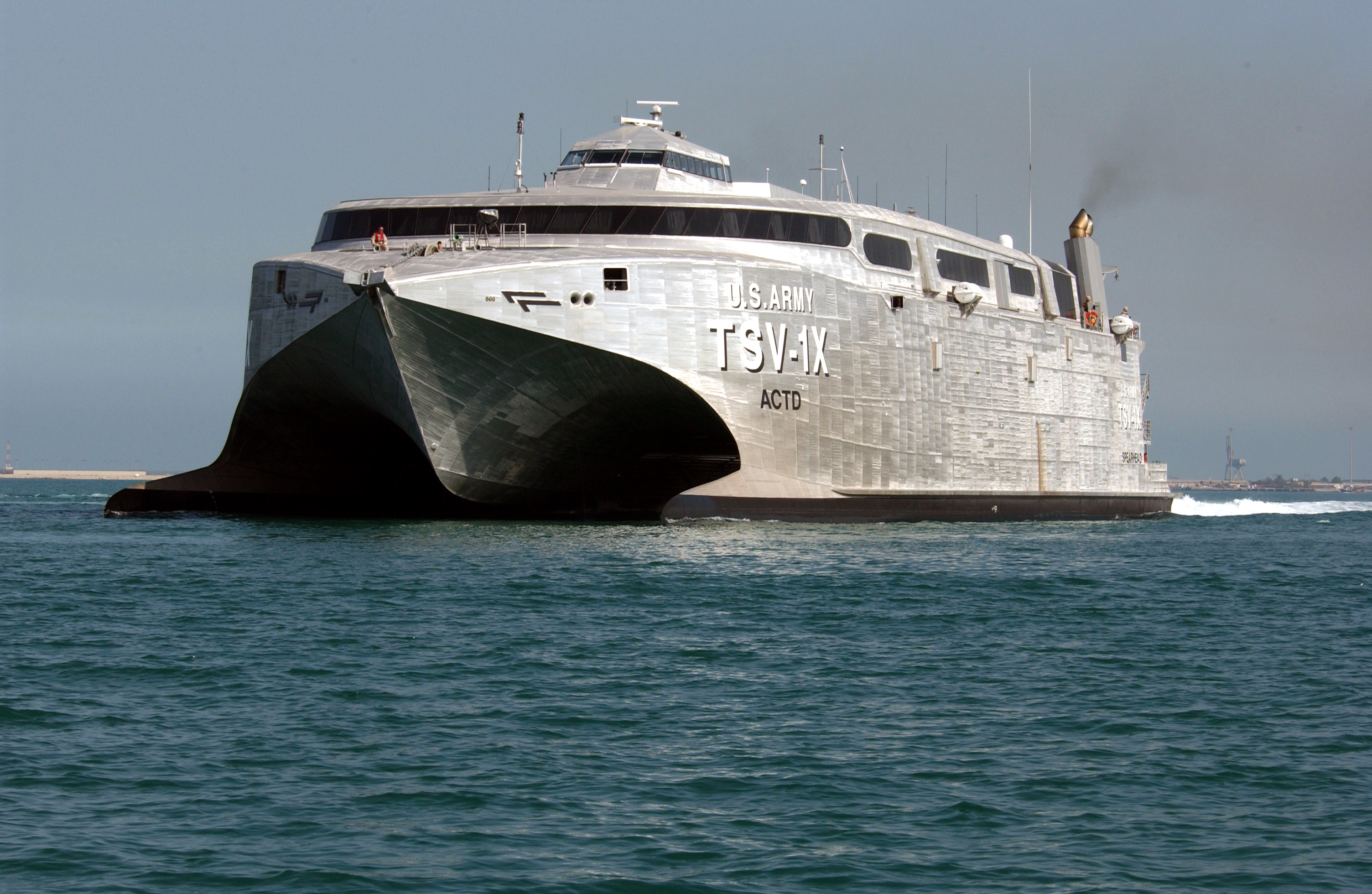
TSV-1X at sea in 2003

As USAV Spearhead (TSV-1X), the ship was the first of the United States Army's theater support vessel (TSV) program. The Army leased Spearhead from Australian fast ferry builder Incat in October 2002. Modifications included helicopter pads suitable for large military helicopters and a two-part hydraulic vehicle ramp that allows rapid loading and discharge of vehicles from the stern or alongside. With its 1,250-ton capacity and shallow draft, Spearhead was the first of what was expected to become a fleet of as many as 17 TSVs.

Spearhead was deployed in January 2003 to support Operation Enduring Freedom and Operation Iraqi Freedom.

The vessel was withdrawn from US Army service in 2005, moving to civilian service as T&T Spirit.

== Sister ships ==
- Hai Xia Hao
- Ift
- Voyager
- Barlovento Express
- Volcan de Tirajana
