= Incat Crowther =

Australian marine engineering firm

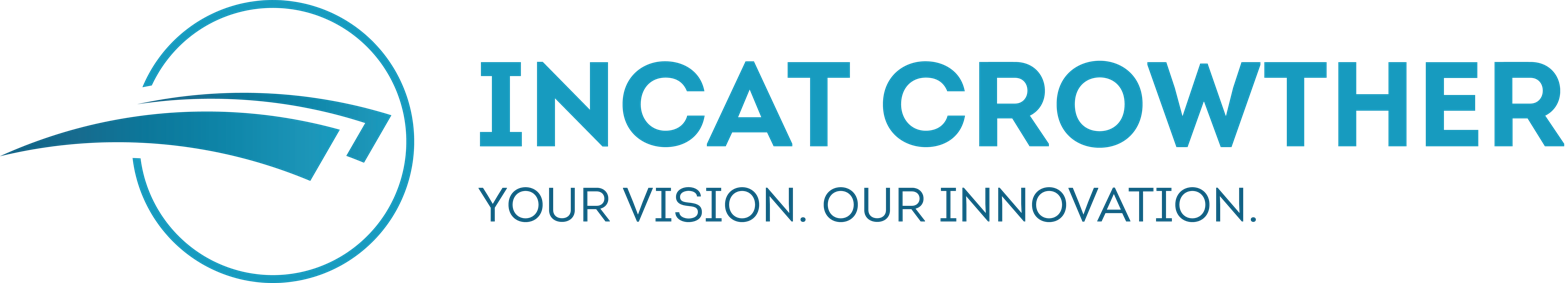
- Type: Proprietary limited company
- Industry: Shipbuilding
- Founded: 2005
- Headquarters: Sydney, New South Wales
- Services: Ship design - monohull, catamaran and trimaran
- Website: incatcrowther.com

Incat Crowther is an Australian marine engineering company, headquartered in Sydney. Incat Crowther has offices in Lafayette, Louisiana, United States and Eastleigh, England.

The company has a diverse product portfolio of designs for monohull, catamaran and trimaran vessels with a composite, aluminium and steel construction for a range of sectors, including commercial, recreational, military and passenger.

== History ==
The company was created from a merger of Incat Designs - Sydney and Crowther Designs in 2005.

Crowther Design founder Lock Crowther had a history in catamaran, trimaran and commercial vessel design.

Incat Designs (Sydney, formed 1988) founder Philip Hercus had a history in passenger vessel catamaran design. In 1977, he formed a partnership, namely International Catamaran Pty Ltd designing and building catamarans in Tasmania. This combination made significant advances in fast powered catamaran technology culminating in the wave piercing catamarans.

Early in 1988, the shipyard partnership was mutually terminated and a design-only company, International Catamaran Designs Pty Ltd (Incat Designs - Sydney) was formed as part of the Hercus Marine Group. The other partner Bob Clifford then commenced designing and building under a new company, Incat.

Both merging companies have had long partnerships with the following shipyards: Gladding-Hearn Shipbuilding, Richardson Devine Marine, Nichols Bros, Gulfcraft, Cheoy Lee Shipyards, Aluminium Marine, Kvichak Marine and NQEA.

Later partnerships have emerged with: Arpoador Engenharia, Astilleros Armon, ETP Engenharia Ltda., Incat, PT Caputra Mitra Sejati Shipyard, Veecraft Marine

Over 650 vessels built to Incat Crowther designs have been delivered. These include Eleanor Roosevelt, the world's first large catamaran Ro-Pax ferry powered by dual-fuel reciprocating engines with cryogenic liquefied natural gas tanks, and New York City Ferry's 40-plus vessel fleet.

== Records ==
A world waterskiing record of 114 Skiers by the Horsehead Water Ski Club on 28 March 2010 was set utilizing the vessel Eagle.

This record was again broken utilizing the Eagle on 27 January 2012 with 145 skiers making the nautical mile journey.
