= Hai Xia Hao =

Ferry built in 2002

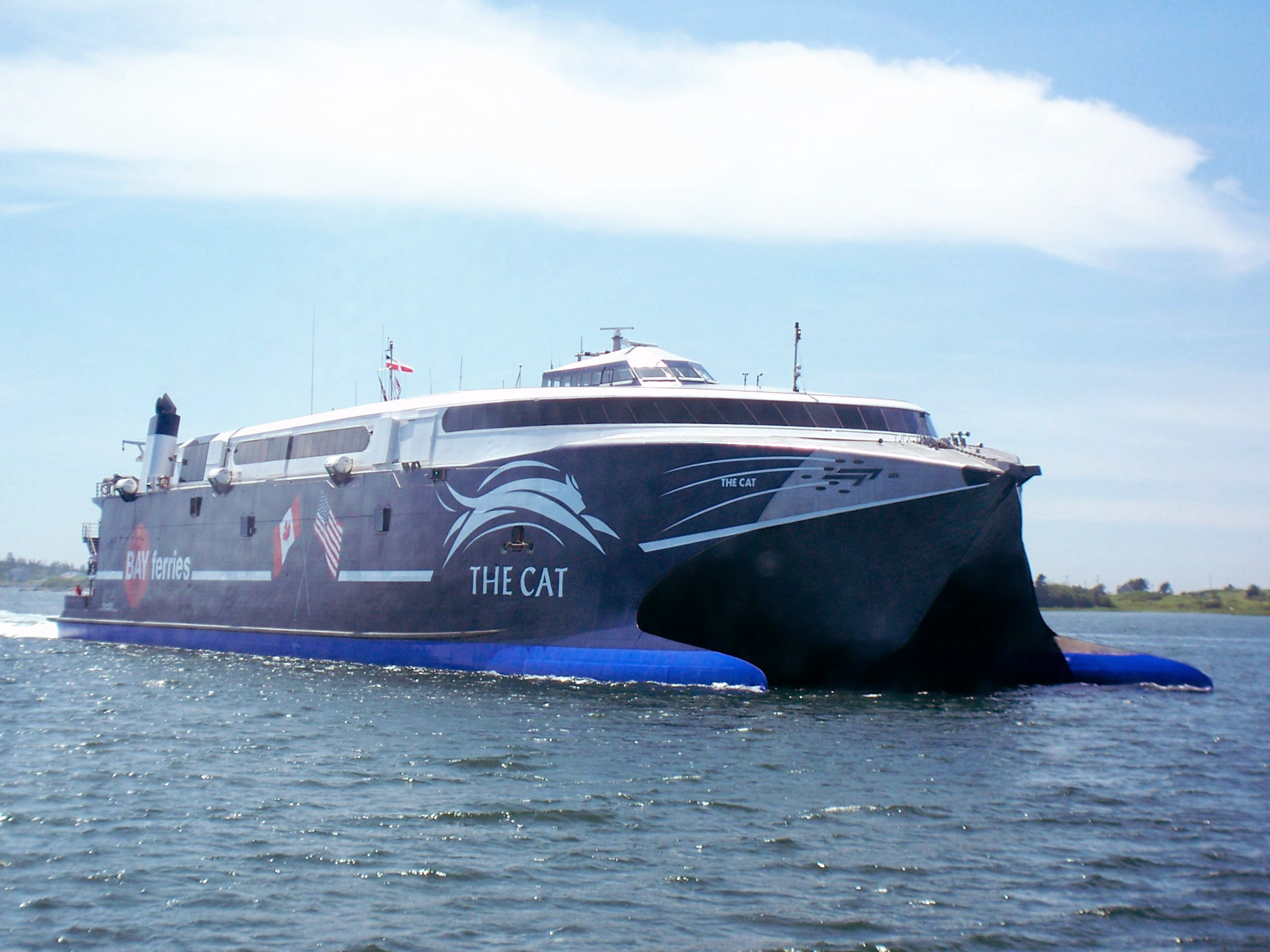
- The Cat in Yarmouth Harbour, Nova Scotia

History
- Name: 2002–2011: The Cat; 2011–present: Hai Xia Hao
- Owner: Bay Ferries
- Operator: 2002–2009: Bay Ferries; 2009–2011: laid up; 2011–present: Fujian Cross Strait Ferry
- Port of registry: 2002–present: Nassau, Bahamas
- Builder: Incat, Tasmania, Australia
- Yard number: 059
- Completed: 2002
- Identification: IMO number: 9237656; MMSI number: 413696180; Callsign: BWHX
- Notes: Classification: Lloyds Register +1A1 HSLC R1 Car Ferry

General characteristics
- Type: High-speed craft
- Tonnage: 6,556 GT
- Length: 97.22 m (319 ft 0 in)
- Beam: 26.6 m (87 ft 3 in)
- Draught: 4.5 m (14 ft 9 in)
- Ramps: Stern ro-ro loading
- Propulsion: 4 × Ruston 20 RK 270 medium-speed diesel engines, 38,000 bhp (28,337 kW)
- Speed: 40 knots (74 km/h; 46 mph)
- Boats & landing craft carried: 10 × 100-person life rafts, 4 escape slides
- Capacity: 760 passengers; 200 vehicles
- Crew: 22

Hai Xia Hao is a passenger / vehicle ferry. It is a high speed catamaran built by Incat, Australia. The ship was formerly named The Cat.

== History ==
The vessel was constructed for Bay Ferries as The Cat and operated seasonally from 2002 to 2005 in international service from May to October across the Gulf of Maine between Yarmouth, Nova Scotia and Bar Harbor, Maine. It replaced the Incat 046 which had inaugurated high speed ferry services in North America on this route in 1997, using the marketing name "The Cat".

Starting in the winter of 2003–2004, Bay Ferries began to operate the vessel as a wet-lease charter during the off-season for the Gulf of Maine service, when the Incat 046 had previously been laid up. From November 2003 to April 2004, The Cat was operated by Bay Ferries for Bahama Florida Express, which was an inaugural high speed ferry service between Port Everglades, Florida and the Bahamas. From December 2004 to April 2005, Bay Ferries operated The Cat between Port of Spain and Scarborough in Trinidad & Tobago for the Government of Trinidad and Tobago. This same route was served by The Cat from November 2005 to May 2006 and Incat 046 filled in from May to October.

After the 2005 demise of the Yarmouth–Bar Harbor route's competitor, Scotia Prince Cruises, using the Scotia Prince between Yarmouth-Portland, Maine, Bay Ferries secured this additional route for The Cat beginning in May 2006. For that season, The Cat operated from Yarmouth to Bar Harbor on Mondays to Thursdays and from Yarmouth to the Ocean Gateway International Marine Passenger Terminal in Portland on Fridays to Sundays.

On 18 December 2009 Bay Ferries announced that it was ending its Gulf of Maine service from Yarmouth to Bar Harbor and Portland after the Government of Nova Scotia ended the subsidies, resulting in approximately 120 jobs being lost. Bay Ferries had been seeking approximately $6.0 million for the 2010 operating season but the provincial government declined, citing financial difficulty.

In 2011 The Cat was purchased by Fujian Cross Strait Ferry. The vessel has been renamed Hai Xia Hao (海峽號) which means "Straits" and operated between Taichung and Pingtan Island.

== Vessel characteristics ==
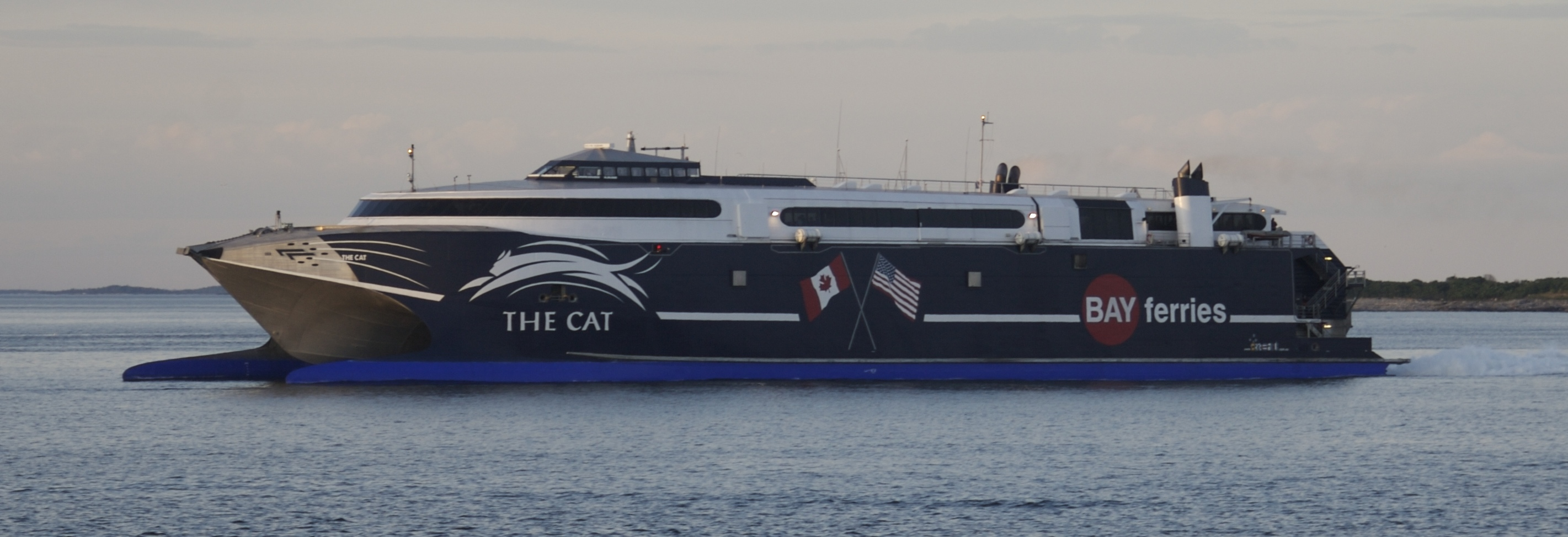
The Cat in Casco Bay

The ship is a 98-metre (321 ft 6 in) vessel built by Incat in Hobart, Tasmania in 2002 as The Cat. The Cat is constructed from marine-grade aluminium alloys. Each water-borne hull is subdivided into multiple watertight compartments connected by an arched bridging structure with a central forward hull above the smooth water line. Each water-borne hull carries two engines which drive water jets mounted on the transom.

Vehicles are stowed in and between both waterborne hulls in a configuration of rising and descending decks which load from a single level transfer bridge at the stern. The main passenger deck is immediately above the vehicle decks and consists of a café, gift shop, children's play area and passenger seating lounges, as well as an outside observation deck that runs the width of the ship at the stern. The passenger seating lounges have overhead television monitors which play movies or television broadcasts, as well as a continuously updated map showing the vessel's GPS coordinates.

== Sister ships ==
Hai Xia Hao is one of six 98-metre catamarans built by Incat. The other vessels are Voyager, T&T Spirit, Barlovento Express, HSV-2 Swift and Volcan de Tirajana.
