= Geelong Flier =

The Geelong Flier
Overview
- Former operator: Victorian Railways

Technical
- Track gauge: 5 ft 3 in (1,600 mm)

The Geelong Flier was an Australian named passenger train operated by the Victorian Railways, running between Melbourne and Geelong. As the first officially named flagship service of the Victorian Railways, the train took pride of place on the timetable, and operated with some of the best available locomotives and rolling stock.

The first run of the service was on 3 May 1926, departing from Flinders Street station Platform No.1 at 9:00 am, stopping only at Spencer Street before running express to Geelong, arriving at 10:10 am. On its return journey, the train left Geelong at 4:00 pm, arriving at Flinders Street at 5:11 pm. It was hauled by locomotive A^{2}906, fitted with Stephenson-link motion and superheating equipment, and consisted of an assortment of short 58 ft (18 m) W-class passenger cars.

== Competing services ==
The Flier was introduced, under the leadership of Chief Railway Commissioner Harold Clapp, to replace the railway-operated bus service from Melbourne to Geelong, and to allow the Victorian Railways to compete with a private bus service operating along the same route. According to the Yailways Commissioners, The Flier was designed to "enable business men and other to leave Melbourne at a convenient hour the morning and return in time for the evening meal". The service ran daily except Sundays.

== Acceleration projects ==
Patronage on the new service was high enough that further expenditure was justified. Within a few months, the schedule was accelerated by ten minutes southbound and nine minutes northbound, due to the provision of automatic staff exchange equipment at crossing loops on the single track between Newport South and North Geelong. That allowed the train to maintain a higher average speed, because it only needed to slow from 70 mph (113 km/h) to 60 mph (97 km/h), rather than 25 mph (40 km/h), when exchanging its section authority. By mid-1927, the train was regularly operating with more and larger carriages, using the newly built 64 ft (20 m) Long-W fleet to provide more seats for less train weight. However, those cars had a different roof style, so their introduction changed the appearance of the train.

== Extension ==
From 17 October 1927, The Flier was extended to Port Fairy, so the former 45 mi (72 km) run became a 185 mi (298 km) one. The title of the train was simplified to The Flier, and it cut 90 minutes from the previous Melbourne-Port Fairy journey time. The W-class cars, supplemented with PL-class carriages, were utilised for passengers between Melbourne and Geelong, and detached there. The longer-distance passengers rode in E-class carriages.

The train was altered to depart from Spencer Street at 8:20 am, arriving at Geelong at 9:23 am, waiting ten minutes to swap the engine for a lighter unit, which also allowed passengers to buy refreshments at the station. It then proceeded to Birregurra, arriving at 10:35 am, pausing at Colac from 10:55 to 11:00 am, and arriving at Camperdown at 11:39 am. The train departed Camperdown at 11:59 pm and stopped at all stations to Port Fairy, arriving at 2:59 pm. On the return, the train from Geelong to Melbourne was formed by a passenger service leaving Camperdown at 2:20pm, running express to Colac and Birregurra, then stopping at Armytage, Winchelsea, Buckley (on request), Moriac, Pettavel (on request), Grovedale (on request), Marshall (on request) and South Geelong, arriving at Geelong at 4:40 pm. It left Geelong station at 5:00 pm., arriving at Spencer Street Station at 6:05 pm. Passengers with cheaper Excursion or Special Football tickets could not travel on the train.

To allow for the new timetable, 33 suburban services in the Melbourne area had to be adjusted and, to allow for the longer, heavier train, the schedule from Melbourne to Geelong was increased from 60 to 63 minutes. When improved locomotives became available, the schedule was cut to 57 minutes outbound and 55 minutes inbound, and those times applied after 1938.

World War II reduced the priority given to passenger trains, and any engine might be used on The Flier, with resulting schedule penalties. Locomotives from the C, D^{3}, K and N classes were all employed. By the end of the war, the portion of the A^{2} fleet fitted with Walschaerts valve gear had been converted to oil firing, which meant the performance of the locomotives was not restricted by the fireman's capacity to shovel coal, but that benefit did not outweigh problems caused by the deteriorated state of the rolling stock and track.

In 1951, the new R-class locomotives took over the run and, a few years later, B-class diesel engines were introduced. The 1954 timetable had the train leaving Spencer Street at 8:25 am and arriving at Geelong at 9:20 am, departing at 9:35 am and stopping at most stations (depending on the day) to Port Fairy, arriving at 2 pm. The train did not stop at Marshall, Buckley, Armytage or Crossley, and Pomborneit and Allansford were only served on Tuesdays through Thursdays. Warncoort, Larpent, Stoneyford, Garvoc and Cudgee were only served on Tuesdays, Thursdays and Saturdays, and Irrewarra, Pirron Yallock, Weerite, Boorcan and Panmure only on Mondays, Wednesdays and Fridays. South Geelong, Moriac, Winchelsea, Birregurra, Colac, Camperdown, Terang, Warrnambool, Koroit and Port Fairy were all served from Monday to Saturday.

On the return, the train named The Flier departed Geelong at 5:08 pm and ran express to Spencer Street Station, arriving 6:05 pm. There was no train from Port Fairy scheduled to form it, but the 3:05 pm Melbourne-bound train from Port Fairy (2:50 pm on Saturdays) had a similar stopping pattern from Port Fairy to Geelong to that of The Flier, and arrived at Spencer Street Station at 8:33 pm, or 8:10 pm on Saturdays. The stations served on particular days of the week were identical, except that all Melbourne-bound trains stopped at Pomborneit, even though only half the Port Fairy-bound trains stopped there.

Occasionally, The Flier was used to transfer random locomotives to or from Melbourne's South Dynon Locomotive Depot, and if those engines were of the T class, the train speed would be restricted to 60 mph (97 km/h). Post-war, additional S type carriages were built which allowed some of the older air-conditioned carriages to be cascaded over to The Flier and, by 1960, the train was assembled with whatever stock was available, giving a mixture of classes, styles and colours.

The 1967 timetable shows The Flier as a Geelong-only service, leaving Spencer Street at 8:25 and arriving at Geelong at 9:20 am, where it formed a Port Fairy train no longer designated as The Flier. The afternoon Flier was a 5:12 pm train originating at Geelong, arriving at Spencer Street at 6:10 pm, and running through to Flinders Street, terminating at 6:17 pm.

== Legacy ==
In late 2019, Port Phillip Ferries began running an Incat-built, 403-seat ferry, named Geelong Flyer [sic] after the Geelong Football Club player Bob Davis, who in turn was named after the former train service.

The ferry initially operated a twice-daily service to and from Melbourne Docklands, using a mooring at the bottom of Moorabool Street. The service complemented the company's Portarlington to Docklands service, and was advertised as providing a more relaxed journey than the increasingly crowded trains on the Geelong-Melbourne line. However, the weekday services between Geelong and Melbourne proved uneconomic and the ferry now runs to and from Geelong at weekends only. Weekday return services still run to Portarlington.
