= Philip Hercus =

Philip Christian Hercus AO
- Born: 20 December 1942; New Zealand
- Died: 3 September 2017 (aged 74)
- Occupation: Ship Designer
- Children: 2
- Website: www.incatcrowther.com

Philip Christian Hercus (20 December 1942 in New Zealand – 3 September 2017) was a naval architect and marine vessel designer in Sydney Australia.

He left New Zealand to attend the faculty of engineering at the University of New South Wales, Australia where in 1967 he gained a Bachelor of Science (Technology) degree in naval architecture.

In 1977), he formed a partnership, namely International Catamaran Pty Ltd designing and building catamarans in Hobart, Tasmania. This combination of Philip Hercus and Bob Clifford made significant advances in fast powered catamaran technology culminating in the introduction of wave piercing catamarans.

Early in 1988, the shipyard partnership was mutually terminated and a design-only company, International Catamaran Designs Pty Ltd (renamed Incat Designs (Sydney)) was formed as part of the Hercus Marine Group. The other partner Robert Clifford then commenced designing and building under a new company, Incat Tasmania Pty Ltd.

Incat Designs (Sydney) and Crowther Designs merged in 2005 becoming Incat Crowther. The key staff from both organizations were maintained with Brett Crowther as Managing Director, Ben Hercus as Commercial Director, Andrew Tuite as Technical Director and Philip Hercus taking the role of Senior Adviser.

Hercus died in September 2017

== Awards ==
Philip Hercus(1992 AGM Michell medal recipient from the Institution of Engineers, Australia).

Clunies Ross National Science and Technology Award in 2000.

Philip Hercus and Robert Clifford received the Order of Australia (AO) in 1995 for service to the shipbuilding industry.
