= Port Phillip Ferries =

Ferry operator in Melbourne, Australia

- Company type: Private company
- Industry: Public transport
- Founded: 2016; 10 years ago
- Founder: Paul Little
- Headquarters: Melbourne, Australia
- Area served: Port Phillip
- Key people: Murray Rance (CEO)
- Services: Ferry services
- Parent: Little Group
- Website: www.portphillipferries.com.au

Port Phillip Ferries is an Australian ferry company that operates on Port Phillip, providing fast ferry services connecting Geelong and Portarlington to Melbourne Docklands.

== Background ==
Ferries had a long tradition of operating throughout Port Phillip, but the last ferries were requisitioned for defence purposes during World War II and the service did not resume after the war ended. By that time roads had improved and buses had advanced to the level where they were faster and more comfortable than ferries. However, with the invention of fast catamaran ferries from 1990, passenger sea transport became more competitive and subsequent innovations in the next two decades led to a much smoother ride. In 2016 the only ferries operating on the bay were short distance tourist shuttles to Williamtown and St Kilda and the Searoad Ferries connection across the Port Phillip heads between Sorrento and Queenscliff.

Port Phillip Ferries aimed to restore longer distance scheduled ferry services on Port Phillip. Journey times were initially slowed by the low speed limit in the lower Yarra River, but a slight increase has improved the situation. The company is owned by Little Group, which is controlled by Paul Little.

== Routes ==
- Portarlington to Melbourne Docklands, twice daily in each direction, commenced 22 November 2016
- Geelong to Melbourne Docklands, twice daily in each direction, commenced 2 December 2019

=== Former route ===
In 2016 the company operated a trial route from Werribee South to Melbourne Docklands, but patronage was insufficient for the service to continue.

=== Future route ===
Possible plans to extend the network to Mornington.

== Fleet ==
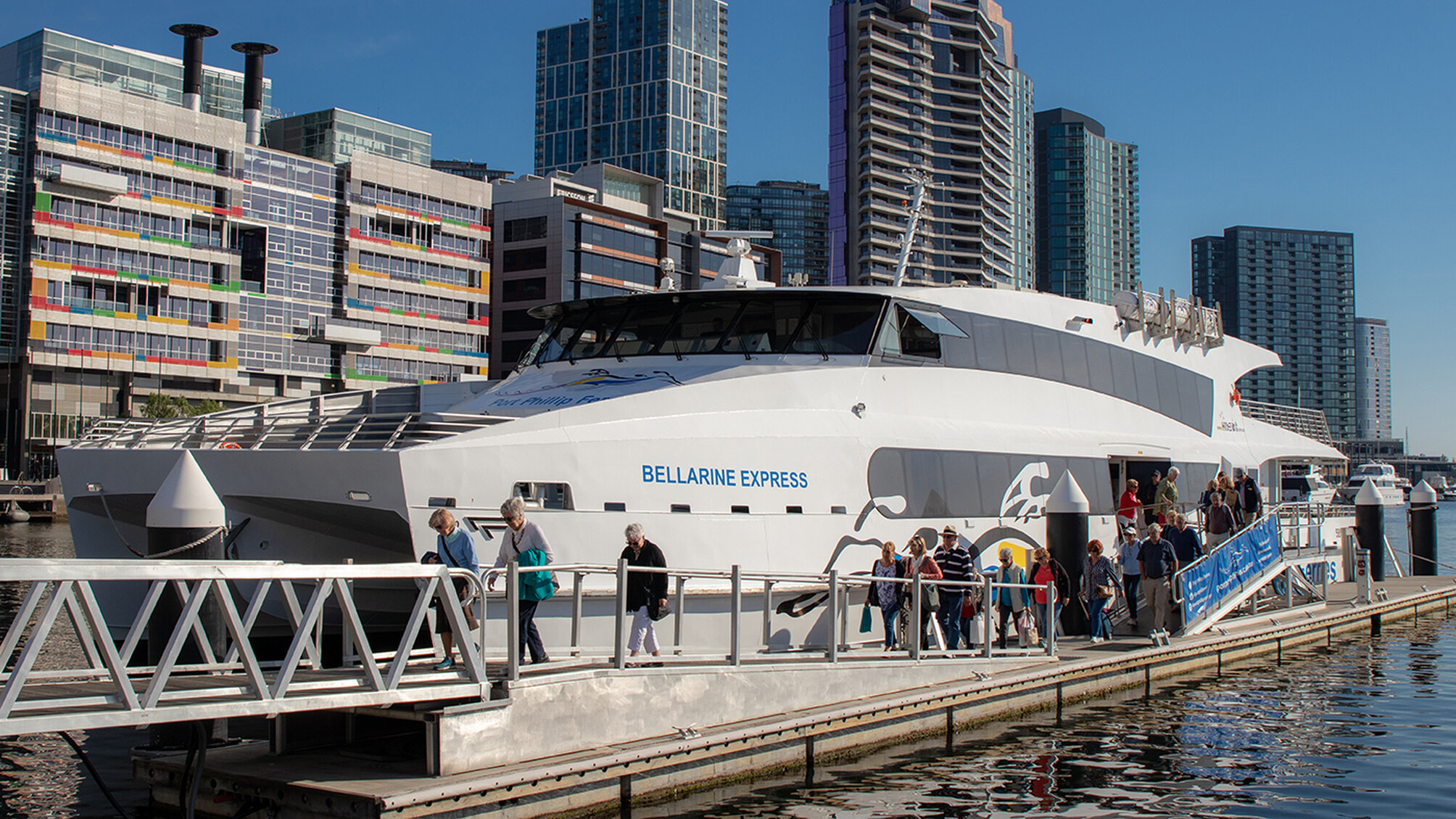
Bellarine Express at Melbourne Docklands in December 2018

Port Phillip Ferries operate two Incat fast catamaran ferries. They are 36 metres long, accommodate over 400 passengers and feature a licensed cafe, bike racks, charging stations and wifi.

- Bellarine Express, 409 passengers, built in 2017 as hull number 090
- Geelong Flyer, named after a fast pre-war express train, 403 passengers, built in 2019 as hull number 095

Before the company ordered its own Incat vessels and had its own permanent crews, the Capricornian Dancer, renamed Wyndham Explorer, a 400-seat, 35-metre EnviroCat ferry was wet leased from SeaLink.
