= Bay Ferries =

Canadian ferry company

- Type: Subsidiary
- Industry: Transportation
- Founded: 1997
- Headquarters: Charlottetown, Prince Edward Island, Canada
- Products: Ferry service
- Parent: Northumberland Ferries Limited
- Website: www.ferries.ca

Bay Ferries Limited, or simply, Bay Ferries, is a ferry company operating in eastern Canada and is headquartered in Charlottetown, Prince Edward Island, Canada. It is a subsidiary of Northumberland Ferries Limited and a sister company to the defunct Bay Ferries Great Lakes Limited.

Bay Ferries began operations in 1997 upon being awarded the operating licenses for ferry routes in the Bay of Fundy and Gulf of Maine which were being discontinued by federal Crown corporation Marine Atlantic as part of cost-cutting measures.

== Bay of Fundy ==
Bay Ferries operates the ferry service across the Bay of Fundy between Saint John, New Brunswick, and Digby, Nova Scotia, using the vessel MV Fundy Rose.

This ferry service is a continuation of steamship service dating to the 19th century, expanded upon by the Dominion Atlantic Railway in the early 20th century and subsequently the Canadian Pacific (CP). The service originally operated from dockside rail facilities at Long Wharf in Saint John and the current public wharf in Digby.

The current terminals in Saint John and Digby were constructed in 1969 by the federal government under an agreement with Canadian Pacific (CP) and the provinces of New Brunswick and Nova Scotia. CP was to build a new ferry, the MV Princess of Acadia (built in 1971), the federal government would construct and own the new ferry terminals, and the provincial governments would construct new roads to link the terminals with the respective highway networks. If CP ever encountered an operating loss, it was agreed that the federal government would take over responsibility for the service.

The service became unprofitable for CP in 1974 and the Federal Government stepped in, providing an operating subsidy to maintain the service. In 1976, the service (and the vessel Princess of Acadia) were transferred to Canadian National and in 1977 was grouped under a separate subsidiary CN Marine. In 1986 this subsidiary was made a separate Crown corporation, Marine Atlantic.

Bay Ferries has continued to operate the year-round service since 1997, using Princess of Acadia until 2015 and then Fundy Rose. The vessels, along with the ferry terminals, are owned by the Government of Canada. The crossing time is approximately 3 hours.

=== Operating Subsidies ===
Although the federal government owns the ferry terminals and vessels, the operation of this inter-provincial ferry service had been one of the few in Canada which was unsubsidized. On June 30, 2006, Bay Ferries announced plans to discontinue the Princess of Acadia service effective October 31, 2006 citing a 25% decrease in passenger totals since 1998. The announcement met with widespread opposition, with a group of local business owners, concerned citizens and ferry company employees organizing a "Save The Ferry" committee to help save the service. Over 130 jobs would be directly terminated as well as hundreds (possibly thousands) indirectly.

The federal government, which still owns the vessel and terminals, as well as the provincial government of Nova Scotia and municipalities on both sides, looked at possible solutions. The Nova Scotia government and Atlantic Canada Opportunities Agency offered a combined $6 million to subsidize the service, with additional funding expected from New Brunswick. A number of subsequent government agreements since 2006 have provided operating subsidies to help keep the ferry in service. The most recent subsidy agreement in 2014 came shortly after an announcement that the federal government would purchase a replacement vessel for Princess of Acadia. This new vessel, Fundy Rose was acquired in late 2014 and entered service between Saint John and Digby in July 2015.

== Gulf of Maine ==
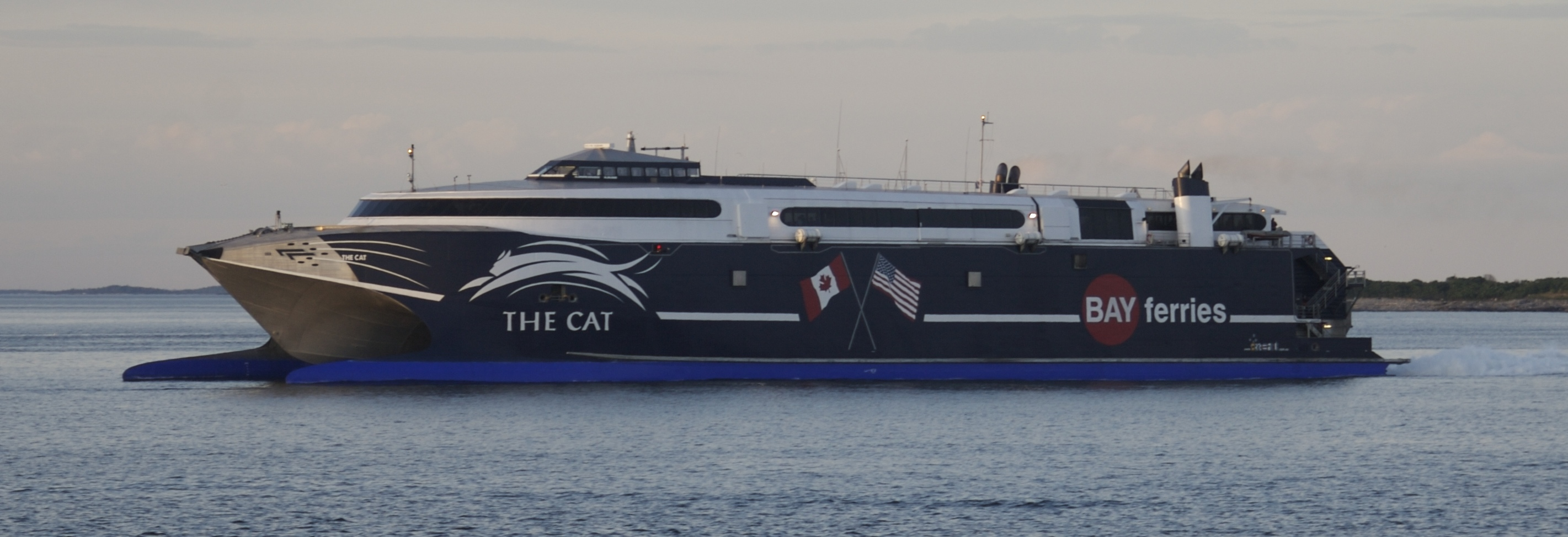
The Cat

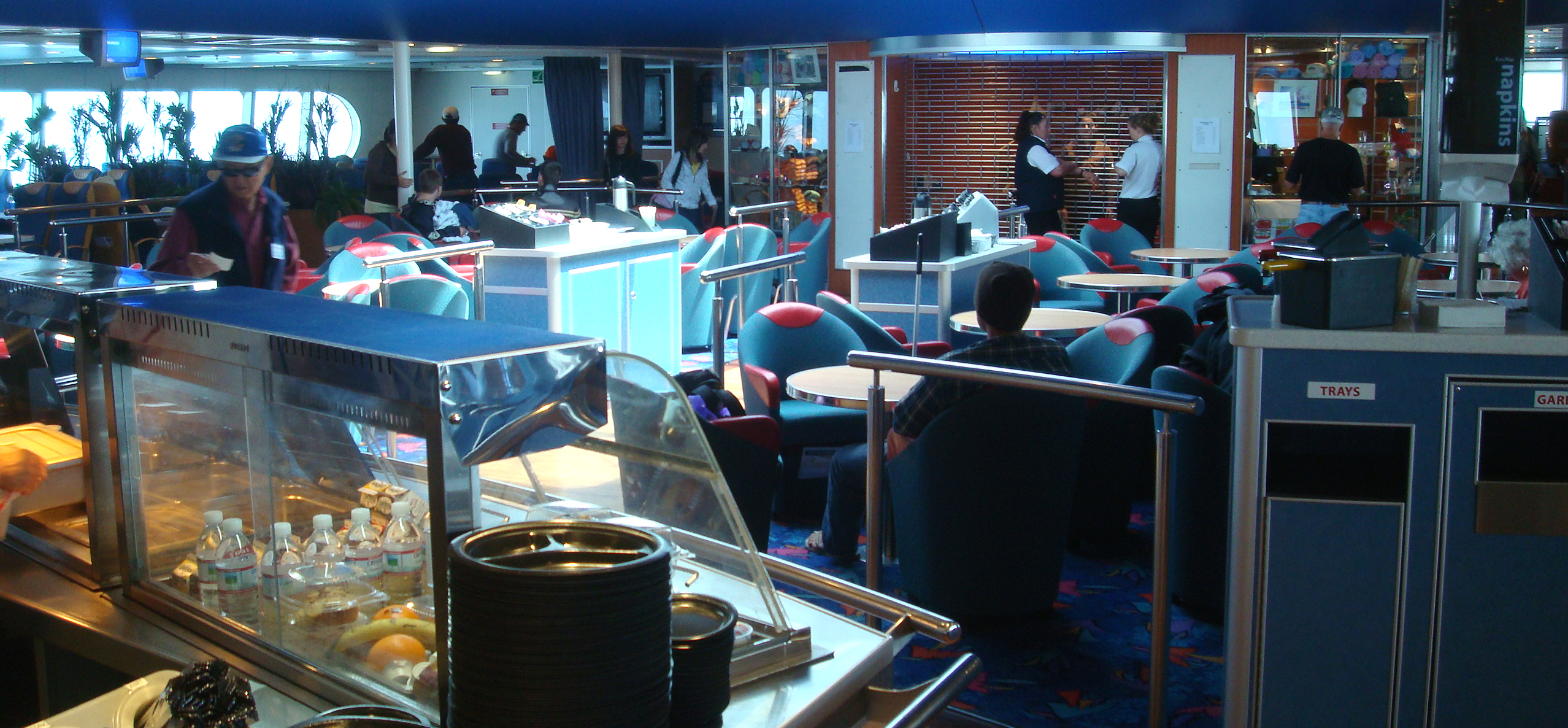
Main dining and lounge area, with two crew members about to open the gift shop in the background

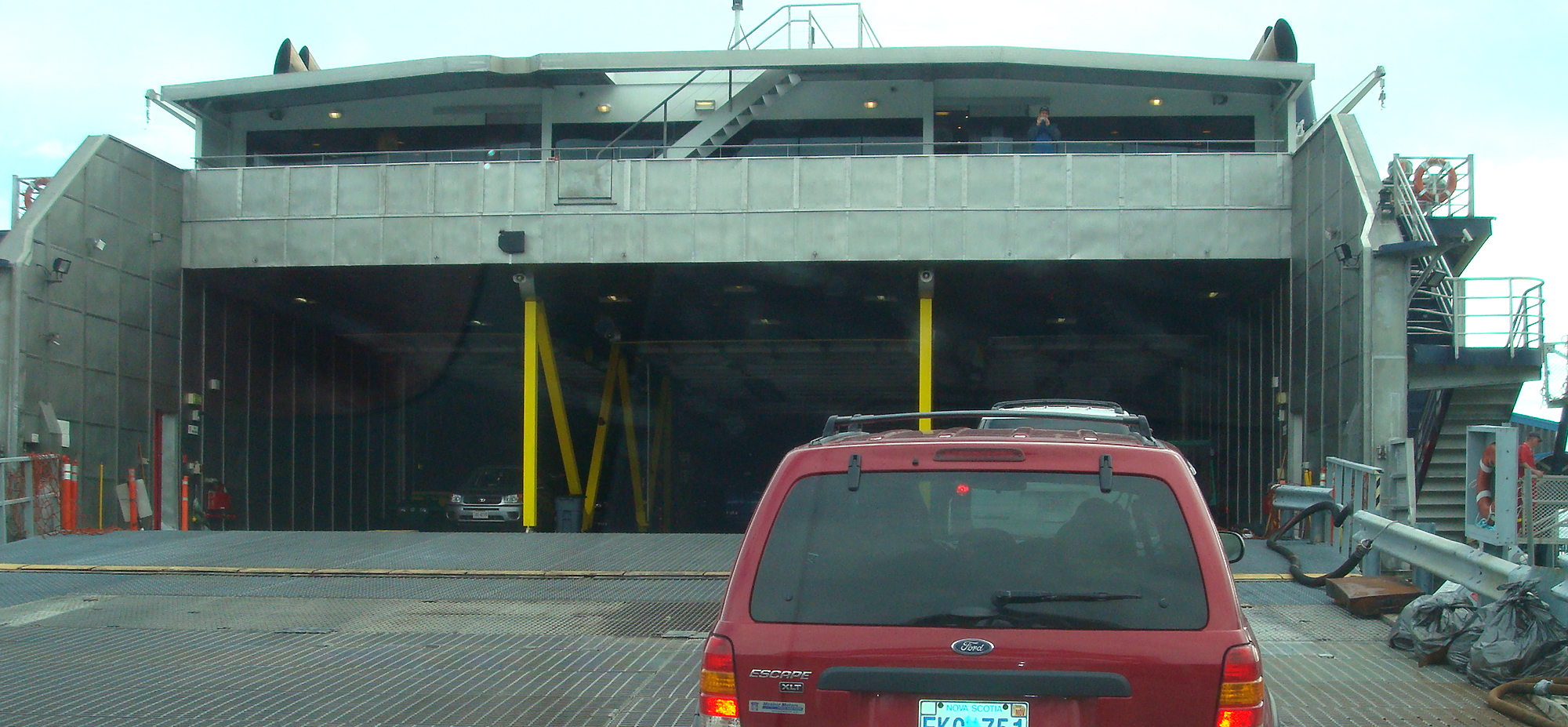
Boarding the CAT ferry in Bar Harbor, ME

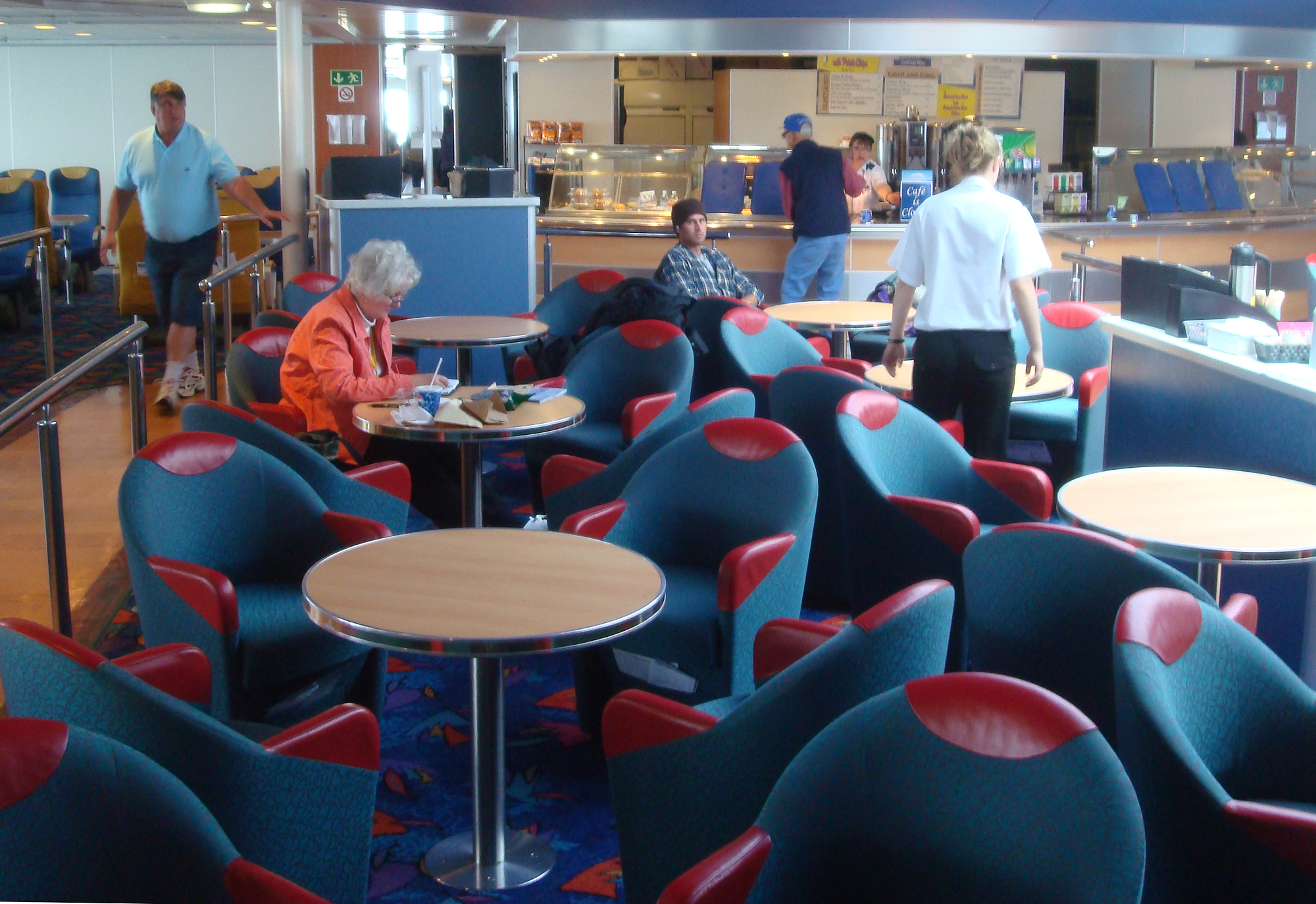
Dining area of CAT ferry

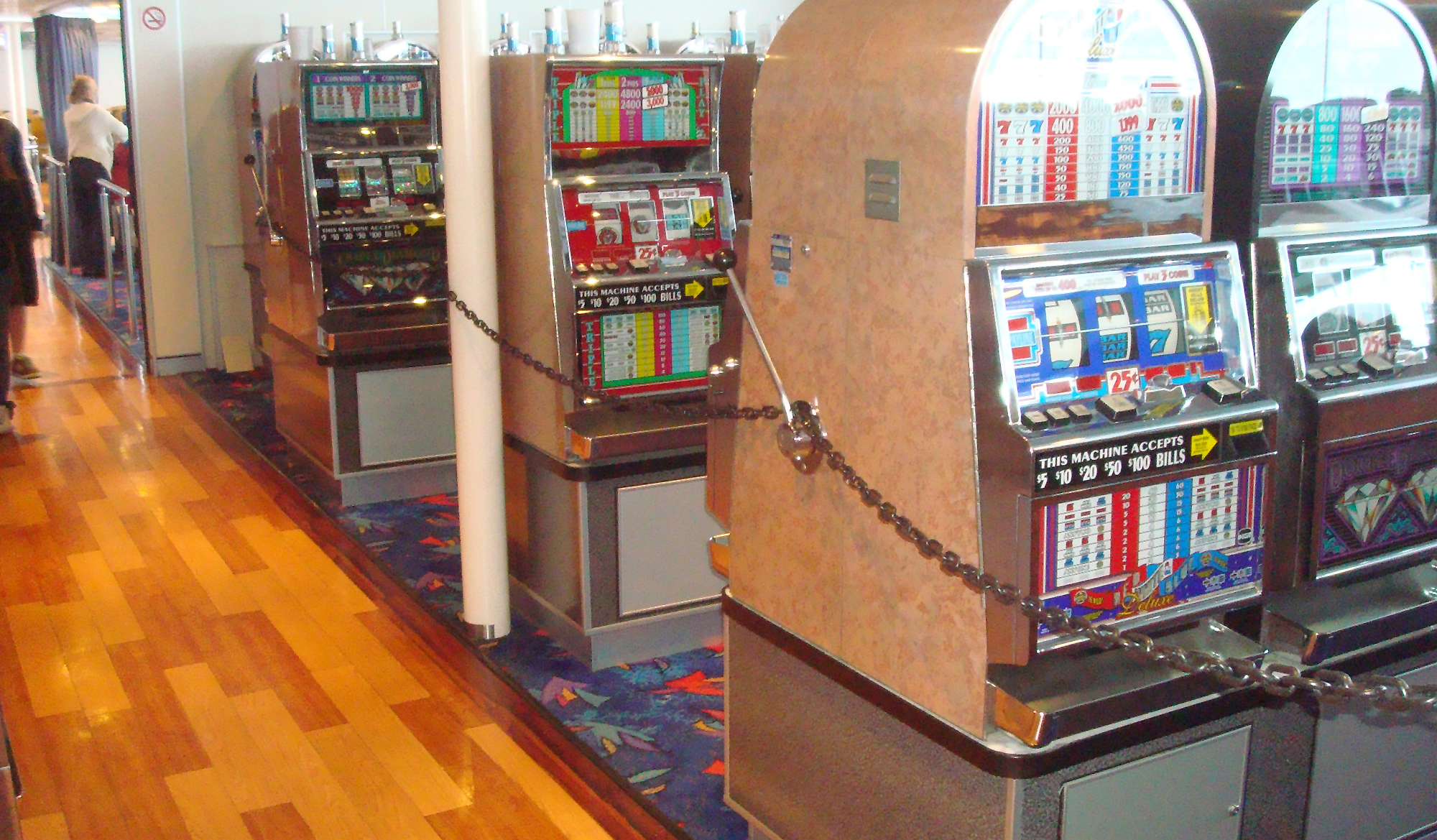
Casino on CAT ferry (operating while ship in international waters)

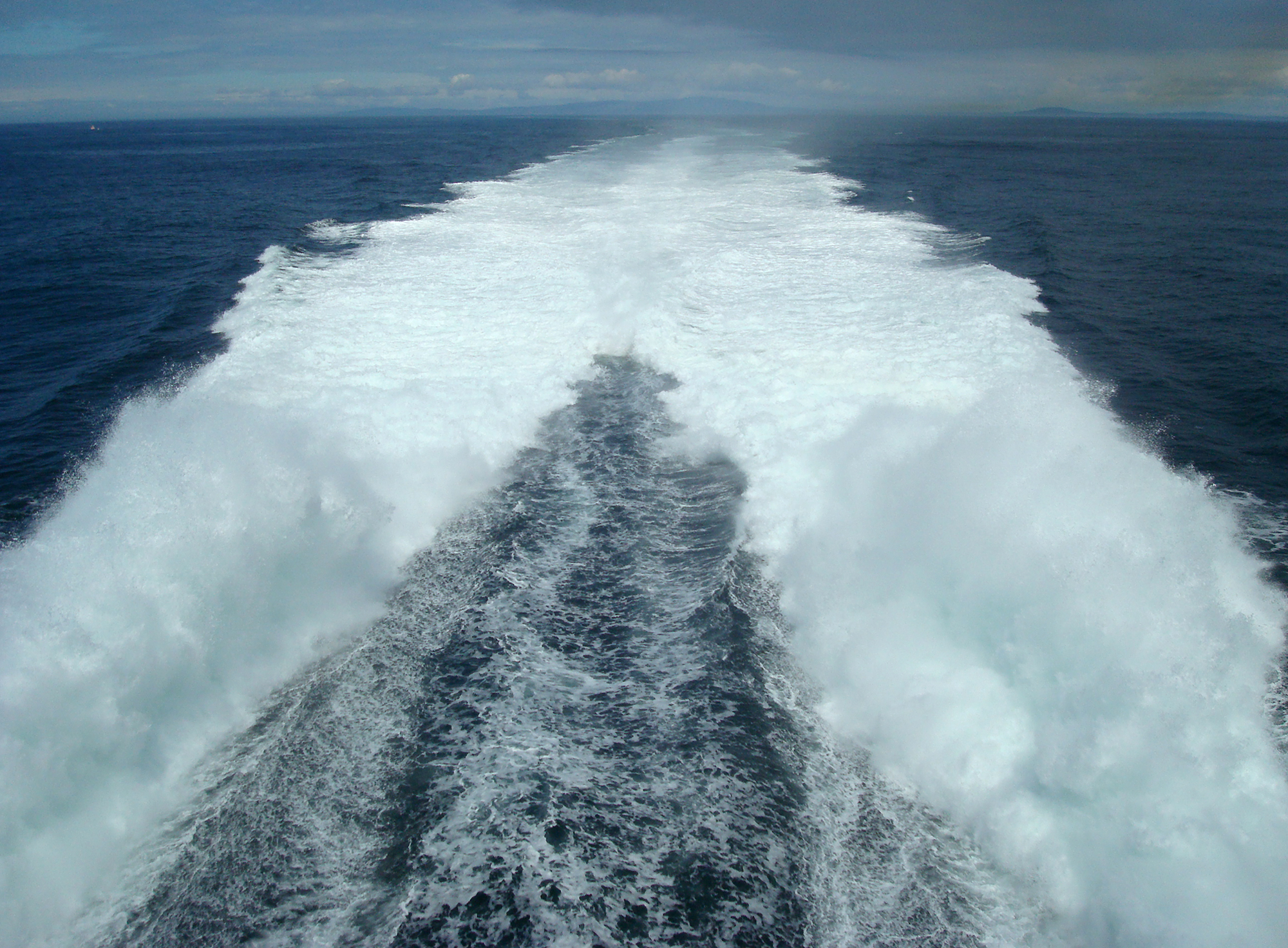
Large engine spray from the CAT

Bay Ferries operated ferry service across the Gulf of Maine from Yarmouth, Nova Scotia, to Bar Harbor, Maine, and from Yarmouth, Nova Scotia, to Portland, Maine, using a high speed catamaran ferry service using the marketing name The Cat.

This ferry route was initiated in 1955 by the Government of Canada at the insistence of tourism operators and fish exporters in southwestern Nova Scotia. Throughout the 19th century and early 20th century, steamship service from Yarmouth to New York City, Boston and Portland, Maine, had been provided by various operators, lastly the Dominion Atlantic Railway, subsequently Canadian Pacific. The resurrected service in 1955 saw new ferry terminals constructed in Yarmouth and Bar Harbor and used the newly commissioned ferry MV Bluenose, named after Nova Scotia's famous racing schooner Bluenose.

The service was operated by Canadian National and in 1977 was included in the CN reorganization which created CN Marine. In 1982 a newer vessel MV Stena Jutlandica was purchased and renamed MV Bluenose (replacing the previous vessel). In 1986 CN Marine became Marine Atlantic which continued to operate the service, although it was scaled back to a seasonal May–October operation by the mid-1990s. Since the Gulf of Maine service operated to the United States, the vessel was not owned by the Government of Canada and was solely the responsibility of CN and later Marine Atlantic.

Following government-mandated service cutbacks to Marine Atlantic in the mid-1990s, Bay Ferries was formed as a subsidiary of Northumberland Ferries Limited and successfully bid for the right to operate the Yarmouth-Bar Harbor route. Upon taking control of the operation in 1997, Bay Ferries continued to operate the MV Bluenose that year, after which it was sold.

Bay Ferries entered into a purchase agreement in late 1997 with Incat in Hobart, Australia, for the Incat 046, a wave-piercing catamaran ferry operating on the Melbourne-Devonport service by Spirit of Tasmania) under the brand name "Devil Cat." Upon acquisition of the vessel in 1998, Bay Ferries began using the term "The Cat" for its Yarmouth-Bar Harbor service in logos on the vessel and in Bay Ferries marketing material. "The Cat" was initially merely the marketing name for the ferry service operated by Bay Ferries, and not the name of the vessel used at the time, which remained HSC Incat 046. The introduction of HSC Incat 046 to the Gulf of Maine met with great publicity and interest among Canadian and American media as this was the first, and currently the fastest (41 knots), large-capacity high-speed ferry in North America, cutting the trip time between the two ports from six hours on a conventional vessel to less than three hours.

The high speed ferry operated between the ports in 2 hours and 30 minutes, compared with a crossing time of over 6 hours using a conventional ferry vessel. The service was seasonal and did not operate during the late fall, winter and early spring when severe ocean storms could inhibit crossings, although the conventional vessels were year-round services for many years.

The Government of Canada maintains ownership of the ferry terminals in Yarmouth (through Transport Canada) and Bar Harbor (through Marine Atlantic) but has leased the management and operating rights to Bay Ferries.

In 2002, Incat 046 was sold, and Bay Ferries purchased a newly-built ship from Incat (hull 059) to replace it, which they this time actually named The Cat.

In spring 2005, rival Gulf of Maine ferry operator Scotia Prince Cruises announced that it was cancelling its Portland, Maine-Yarmouth service offered by a conventional vessel, Scotia Prince, as a result of toxic mould problems at its ferry terminal in Portland, the old Portland Marine Terminal. The city of Portland was in the process of constructing a replacement ferry terminal, but it assumed that financial difficulties would prevent Scotia Prince Cruises from returning to the Yarmouth service and entered into discussions with Bay Ferries about expanding its Gulf of Maine service to include Portland, in addition to Bar Harbor. An announcement was made in late summer that Bay Ferries would include "The Cat"-branded service to both ports from Yarmouth beginning in 2006 using The Cat.

Beginning with the 2006 and continuing into the 2007 operating seasons, the Government of Nova Scotia provided an annual $1.5 million subsidy to Bay Ferries due to declining passenger revenue and increased fuel expenditures. The subsidy was increased by the provincial government for the 2008 operating season to $6.0 million to account for rising costs and further declines in revenue. It is unknown how much of a subsidy was provided for the 2009 operating season but it is believed to surpass the 2008 amount. The company has received subsidies totaling $18.9 million since the fall of 2007.

On December 18, 2009 Bay Ferries announced that it was ending its Gulf of Maine service from Yarmouth to Bar Harbor and Portland after the Government of Nova Scotia ended the subsidies, resulting in approximately 120 jobs being lost. Bay Ferries had been seeking approximately $6.0 million for the 2010 operating season but the provincial government declined, citing financial difficulty. As of June, 2010, The Cat could often be seen docked at its former terminal in Bar Harbor.

In 2011, The Cat was sold to Fujian Cross Strait Ferry in Fujian, China and was renamed Hai Xia Hao, and used to provide passenger and vehicle ferry service between Taichung, Taiwan and Pingtan Island, in China.

For a number of years following 2011, there was no ferry service between Maine and Nova Scotia. During the 2014 and 2015 seasons, a separate company, Nova Star Cruises, operated a cruiseferry between Portland and Yarmouth, though the company closed at the end of the 2015 season and the vessel was sold.

In March 2016, only a few months after the closure of Nova Star Cruises, Bay Ferries Limited announced that it had reached an agreement with the U.S. Maritime Administration and the U.S. Navy for a multi-year charter of a new high-speed catamaran, HST-2. The vessel will be operated for a passenger/vehicle ferry service between Portland, Maine and Yarmouth, Nova Scotia. The vessel continues to be named HST-2, but the service and vessel are branded as The CAT to align with the previous branding. The vessel underwent a refit at a shipyard in South Carolina and the service started on June 15, 2016.

In late 2018, Bay Ferries announced plans to change the ferry’s port in Maine from Portland to Bar Harbor. Service along this new route was originally expected to begin in summer 2019, but was delayed due to construction work at the Bar Harbor marina. Service was then cancelled during both the 2020 and 2021 seasons due to the COVID-19 pandemic. The CAT resumed Bar Harbor service for the 2022 season.

== Trinidad and Tobago ==
Beginning on January 10, 2005, Bay Ferries started operating HSC Incat 059 under a wet charter to provide a ferry service in the Republic of Trinidad and Tobago. The Government of Trinidad and Tobago chartered the vessel and a Bay Ferries crew for six months to service the country's ferry route considered a 'sea bridge' between the islands of Trinidad and Tobago.

Under the terms of the charter, the government agreed to pay Bay Ferries US$23,800 per day to ferry persons, goods, and vehicles between the two islands. The HSC Incat 059 (still using its service trademark "The Cat") was taken from its seasonal layup to the Caribbean before returning to the Gulf of Maine for its regular six-month summer schedule. During the winter of 2003–2004 HSC Incat 059 briefly tested a route between Florida and the Bahamas.

The Government of Trinidad and Tobago has been in the process of trying to purchase a fast ferry to serve the inter-island route all year long. The other vessel used by Bay Ferries in Trinidad and Tobago service during May–October is the HSC Incat 046, now known as the "Lynx" from New Zealand and formerly used by Bay Ferries on the Gulf of Maine before the Imcat 059 (See above).

On April 21, 2005 HSC Incat 059 became an indispensable link between the two islands after a Tobago Express aircraft had problems with its landing gear over the 'air bridge' route. The entire Tobago Express fleet was grounded for several days pending inspections to the fleet and citizens were left depending fully on the high speed ferry service.

During the 2004–2005 winter season HSC Incat 059 ferried almost 175,000 passengers and a total of about 25,000 vehicles between the islands.

The Government of Trinidad and Tobago announced that HSC Incat 059 would return to offer inter-island service in November 2005 until the following May. The government has since purchased two new Incat fast ferries, the 91m Incat 046 and the 98m T&T Spirit (Incat 060) which are currently managed by Bay Ferries Management Limited

== Current fleet ==
Ship	Built	Entered service	Current status	Route
MV Fundy Rose	1999	2015	In Service	Saint John-Digby
HST-2	2007	2016	In Service	Bar Harbor-Yarmouth

== See also ==
- Public transportation in Maine
