= HSC Manannan =

Ship built in 1998

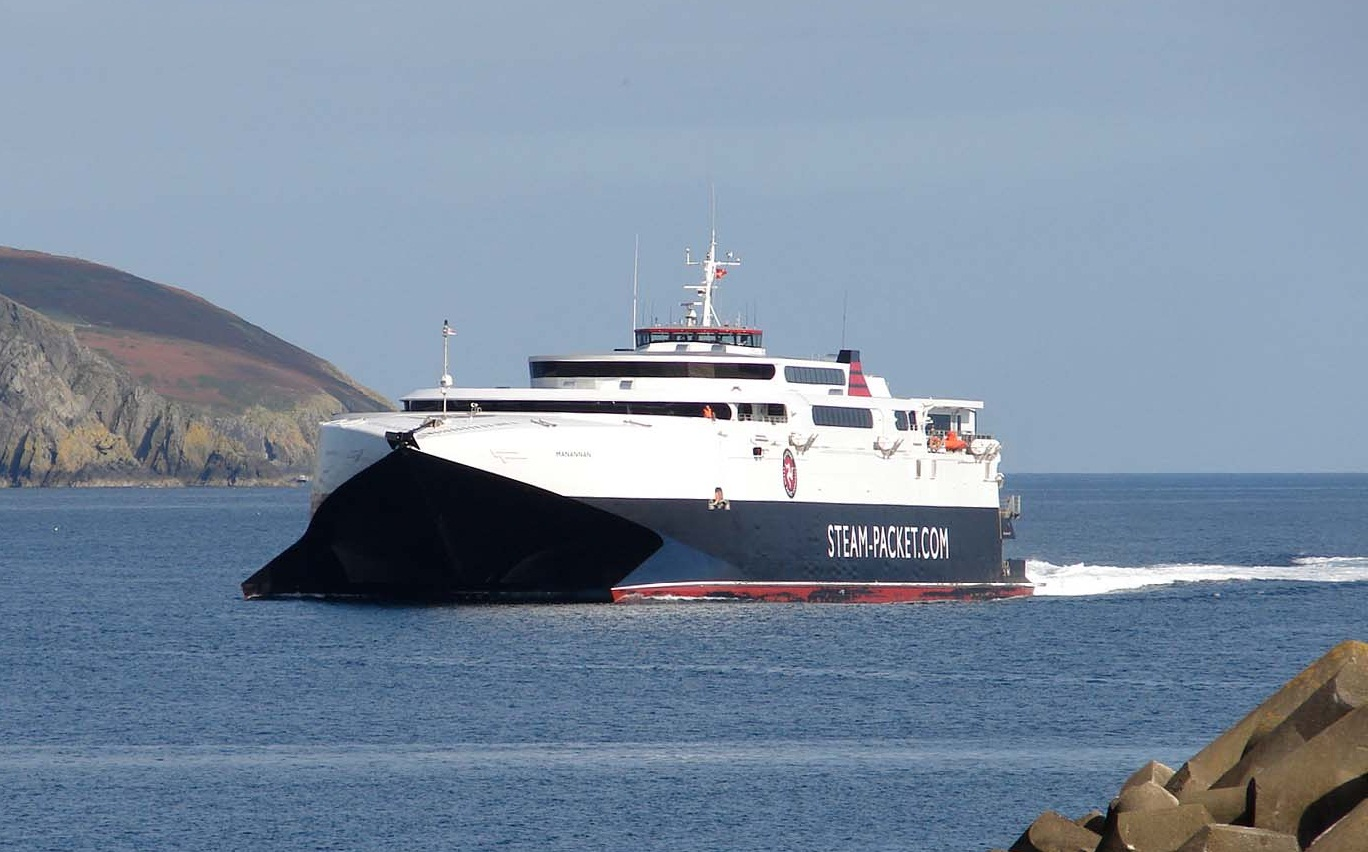
- Manannan entering Douglas Harbour

History
- Name: 1998–2001, 2008: Incat 050; 2001–2008: Joint Venture; 2008–present: Manannan
- Namesake: Manannán mac Lir
- Operator: 1998–1999: Spirit of Tasmania; 1999–2000: Fast Cat Ferries; 2000–2001: Laid-up; 2001–2008: United States Navy; 2008–present: Isle of Man Steam Packet Company
- Port of registry: (Isle of Man) Douglas Harbour
- Route: Douglas Harbour—Liverpool; Douglas—Larne; Douglas―Dublin; Douglas—Heysham
- Builder: Incat, Hobart, Australia
- Yard number: 050
- Launched: 7 November 1998
- Completed: 21 November 1998
- Commissioned: 1998
- Recommissioned: 2009
- Refit: 2001, 2009
- Identification: IMO number: 9176072; MMSI Number 235070199; Callsign 2BXK7
- Status: In service

General characteristics
- Class & type: 96 metre WPC
- Type: High speed craft
- Tonnage: 5,743 GT
- Length: 95.47 m (313 ft 3 in)
- Beam: 26.16 m (85 ft 10 in)
- Draft: 3.7 m (12 ft 2 in)
- Installed power: 4 × Caterpillar diesel engines
- Speed: Lightship condition: 50 kn (93 km/h; 58 mph) Fully laden: 40–42 kn (74–78 km/h; 46–48 mph).
- Capacity: Passengers: 850; Vehicles: 175

HSC Manannan is a 96-metre (315 ft) wave-piercing high-speed catamaran car ferry built by Incat, Australia in 1998. After commercial service in Australia and New Zealand, she was chartered to the US military as Joint Venture (HSV-X1). Now owned and operated by the Isle of Man Steam Packet Company, she mainly provides a seasonal service between Douglas Harbour and Port of Liverpool.

== Early history ==
Manannan is one of six 96-metre (WPC 96) catamarans built by Incat, Australia. She was built as Incat 050 in 1998. Under the name Devil Cat, she operated for a short period as a commercial ferry for Spirit of Tasmania. A spell followed crossing the Cook Strait as Top Cat. Then she was acquired by the United States Navy and converted for military purposes.

== United States Navy ==
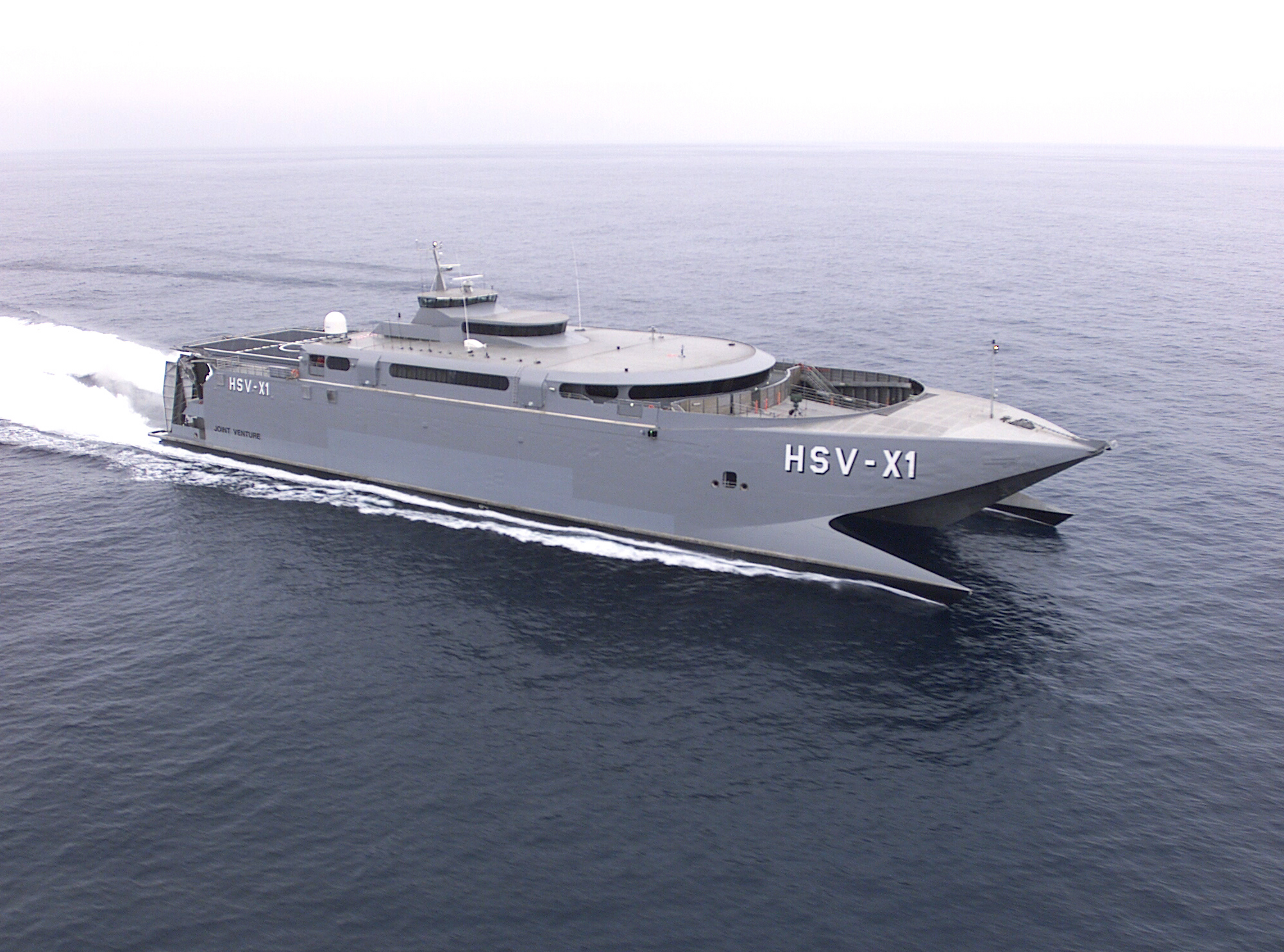
HSV-X1

In 2001, she was contracted by the United States Armed Forces for a five-year, joint Army/Navy program, as Joint Venture (HSV-X1). A flight deck was added to accommodate various US military helicopters. Joint Venture was rapidly re-configurable and could perform a variety of missions, principal among them the ability to ferry up to 325 combat personnel and 400 tons of cargo up to 3,000 nautical miles (5,600 km) one way at speeds in excess of 40 knots (74 km/h).

In 2003, Joint Venture was assigned to Operation Enduring Freedom in the Horn of Africa. She operated as a fast transport in support of the Combined Joint Task Force and performing a variety of tasks, such as transporting and supplying troops at high speed over long distances, operating as a mobile command centre, working close inshore, and operating as a helicopter carrier.

At the end of the five year charter, she was handed back to Incat in early 2006. She was struck from the Naval Vessel Register and re-listed as "IX-532" (unclassified experimental). She then underwent a refit and was painted in the livery of Express Ferries. Plans for her to enter service as a car and passenger ferry never materialised.

== Isle of Man Steam Packet Company ==
On 19 May 2008, the Isle of Man Steam Packet Company announced the purchase of the wave-piercing catamaran for £20 million, as the replacement for the fast craft Viking. Because of its previous use, the company said it had significantly fewer hours of service than a vessel of comparable age and was ideally suited for the planned service. She completed the 11,868 miles (19,100 km) voyage from Hobart to Portsmouth Harbour, with most of the materials for her refit, in 27 days.

A £3 million refit, carried out by Burgess Marine, Portsmouth, provided a new aft accommodation module and the "Sky Lounge". The heavy military ramp was replaced with a new stern door and the helideck was removed. Following this, she arrived in Douglas on 11 May 2009. An open day took place at each of the company's ports and at a renaming ceremony, she was renamed after Manannán mac Lir, the Celtic god of the Irish sea. Manannan made her maiden service voyage with the Steam Packet Company on Friday 22 May 2009 on the 07:30 sailing from Douglas Harbour to Liverpool.

During the winter period 2014/2015 Manannan was fitted with a removable mezzanine deck which created additional space for motorcycles during the Isle of Man TT and Festival of Motorcycling periods, allowing fans who have previously traveled as foot passengers the chance to bring their bikes. - by late March 2015, the number of motorcycles booked for the TT Festival was up 10% on the previous year.

=== Service ===
Until 2018, at 96 metres (315 ft), Manannan was the largest vessel of its kind on the Irish Sea until Irish Ferries took delivery of the Dublin Swift. In summer season, she operates daily sailings from Douglas to Liverpool, and weekly/twice weekly sailings to Belfast and Dublin. During the winter, Manannan remains in Douglas on reserve and sails to Liverpool to have her annual overhaul before returning for the summer season.

=== Onboard facilities ===
Manannan's passenger facilities are located over two decks.

=== Incidents ===
In April 2015 the Manannan suffered six days of cancelled sailings due to damage to its jet system caused by sea debris. All sailings between the Isle of Man and Liverpool were cancelled and passengers were transferred to sailings on the Ben-my-Chree to and from Heysham, while the P&O Ferries vessel Express was chartered for a sailing to Larne in place of a cancelled Belfast sailing. Express also suffered damage while in Manx waters and P&O were forced to cancel a number of their own sailings as a result.

Steam Packet boss Mark Woodward told a local newspaper, "Since 2007 there have been 17 recorded major incidents where our ships have been damaged and passengers have been inconvenienced by disrupted schedules as a result... the damage was incurred seven days after the vessel recommenced seasonal operational service and just three weeks after leaving dry-dock. All of this equipment was fully inspected during the docking period by Steam Packet Company engineering staff, along with Classification Society Surveyors and all found to be in good order." The ferry returned to service on 11 April 2015 once repairs were completed. The estimated price of repairs was above £100,000.

On 24 March 2016, the Manannan collided with the Victoria Pier in Douglas Harbour on arrival at 22:30. Five passengers were taken to hospital with minor injuries and the following day's sailings were cancelled, with passengers being transferred to the Ben-my-Chree. The vessel suffered damage to the port side, causing the front of the hull to be bent to the left. The collision was caused by a systems control failure.

In September 2023, she suffered damage to one of her engines, which will require a full rebuild. She will run on three engines for the rest of the year which will increase the crossing time by 45 minutes.

== Photo gallery ==
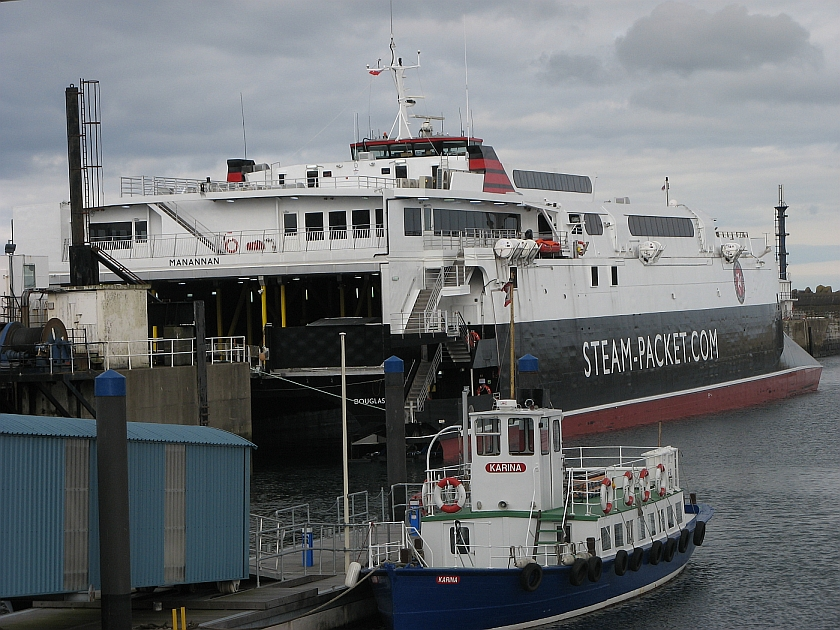
Manannan berthed in Douglas Harbour

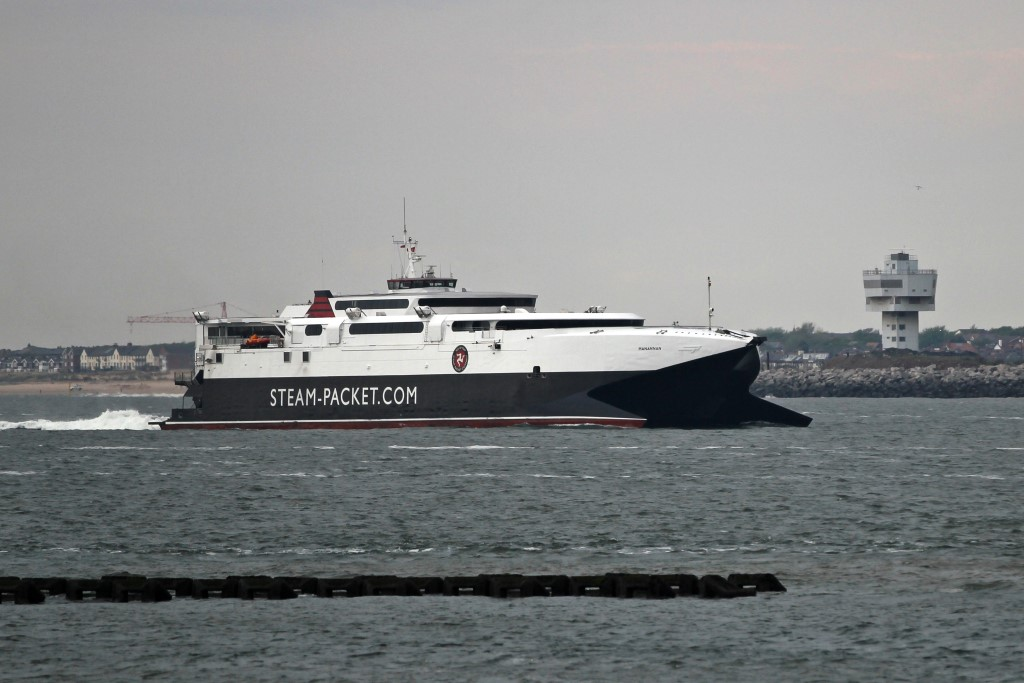
Manannan entering the River Mersey

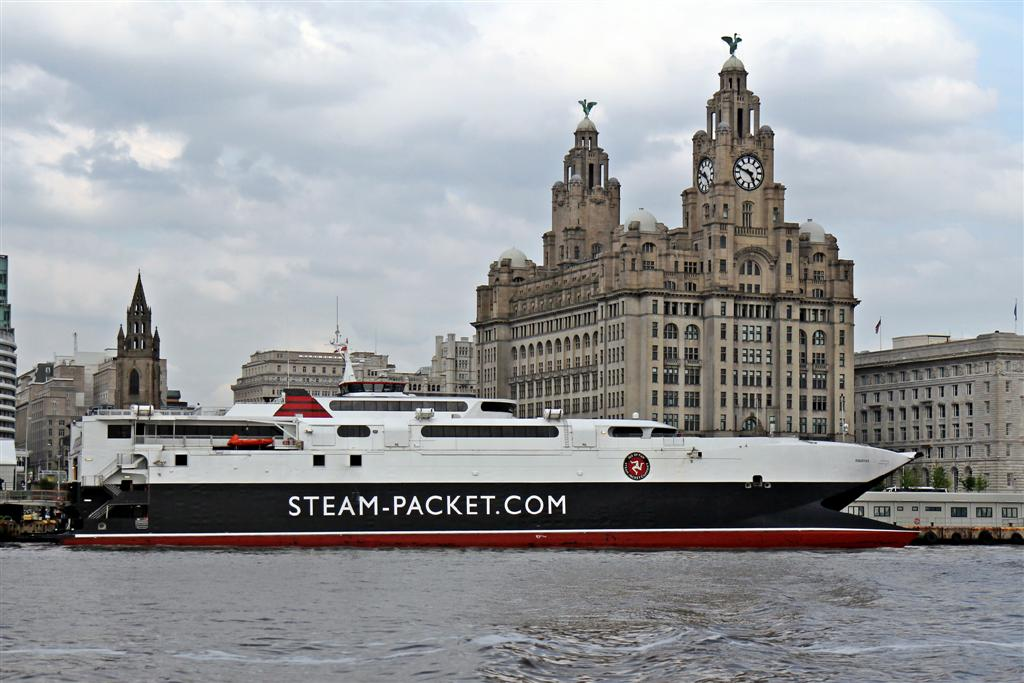
Manannan at her former (until 2024) berth in Port of Liverpool

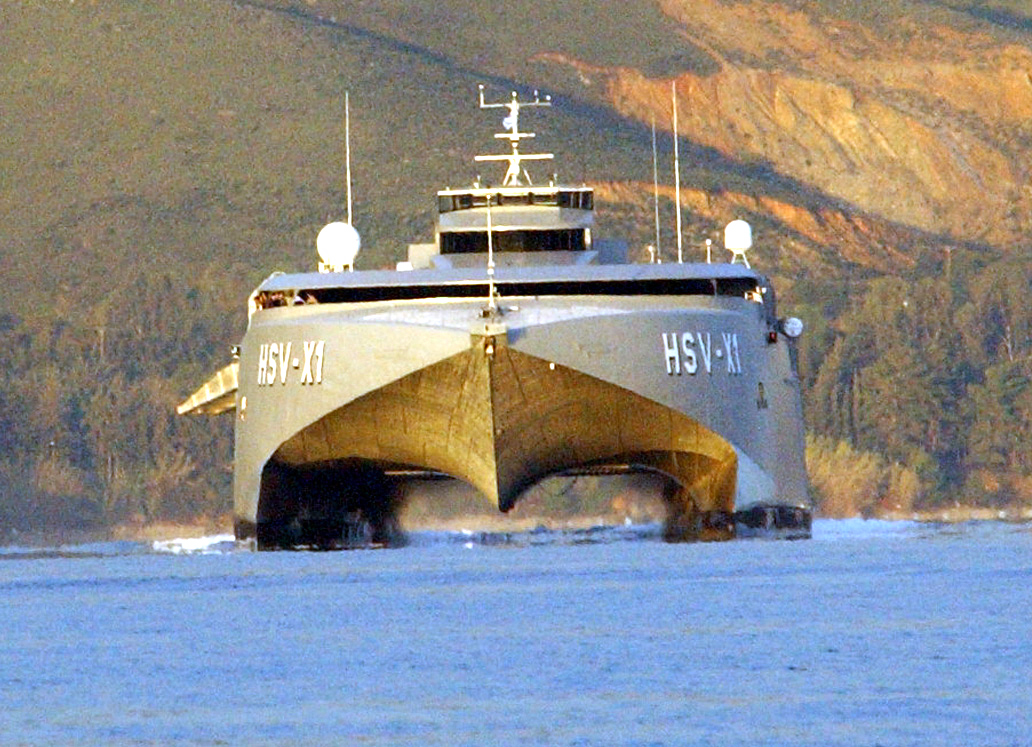
as Joint Venture (HSV-X1).

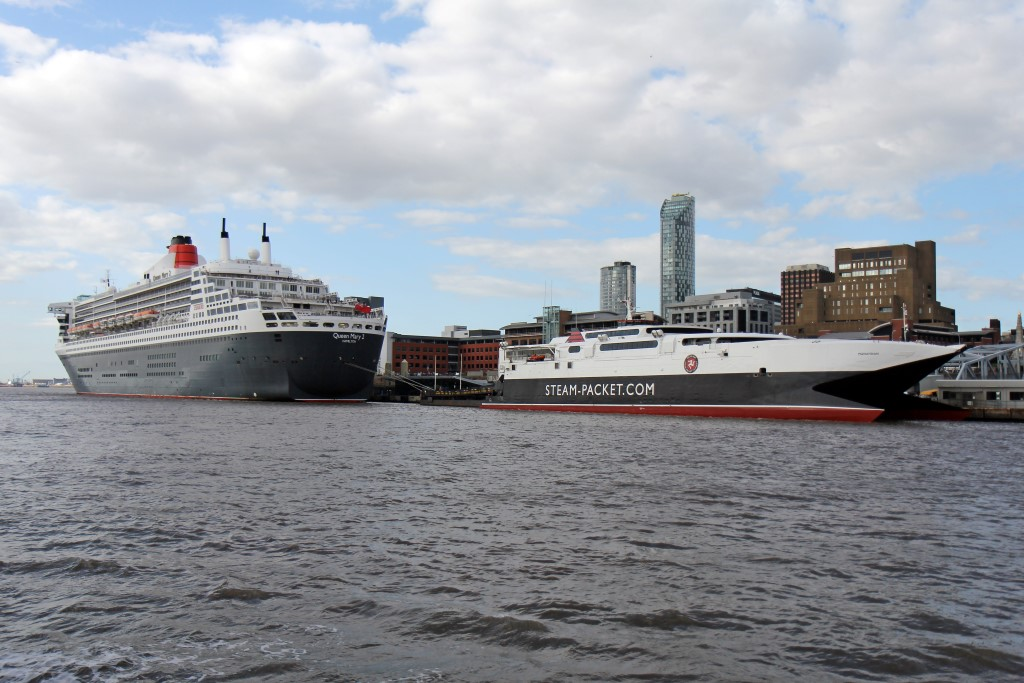
with Queen Mary 2 at Pier Head

== See also ==
- List of multihulls
