= Bob Clifford =

Australian shipbuilder and businessman

Robert Clifford
- Born: Tasmania, Australia
- Occupations: Chair and founder of incat

Robert "Bob" Frederick Clifford AO is an Australian shipbuilder and businessman, best known for his success in building his Incat catamaran building company into an international brand that sells wave piercing catamaran ferries all over the world including to the US military and many European ferry operators.

== Life and career ==
In 1963, Bob Clifford was awarded the apprentice of the year award for printing. He began his boat-building business in his backyard before expanding it to a commercial operation. Eventually he went into partnership with Philip Hercus, who helped him expand Incat into a serious shipbuilding operation.

In 1994, Clifford skippered his maxi yacht Tasmania to line honours victory in the 50th anniversary Sydney to Hobart yacht race. In 1994, Clifford experienced one of his blackest moments when he accidentally ran aground his $40 million catamaran Condor II upon Blackjack Rock in the mouth of the Derwent River. He has won numerous design and manufacturing awards for his shipbuilding exploits.

=== Incat ===
He spent much of his early years as a fisherman and turned his passion for the sea into a backyard boat building operation. He was successful, and promoted the idea of fast commuter ferries and turned his company into one of the world's leading manufacturers of high-speed catamaran ferries. The Tasman Bridge disaster result in high demand for Clifford's ferry business. Developing much of the technology locally, Incat researched and designed high-tech, high-speed wave piercing catamarans.

By September 1977, Incat launched their first high-speed catamaran at Prince of Wales Bay, Tasmania. Since then they have expanded their operation into 98- and 112-metre wavepiercer production.

The catamarans have proved to be one of Australia's best industrial success stories of recent years, and during the 1990s when Tasmania's economy was suffering badly, the product provided a ray of hope to the ailing state. Over twenty of the catamarans have been sold to European operators, and a higher number has been sold to the US military. At the height of their success, Incat held more than 40% of the world's high speed ferry manufacturing market. Although the market has slowed, Incat has moved into production of catamaran freight vessels, and they are developing the design for even longer, 150-metre ferries.

== Honours ==
Clifford has been awarded the Officer of the Order of Australia (AO) in 1995, and an honorary Engineering degree (DEng.) from the University of Tasmania. He was also named Tasmanian of the Year in 1988.
