= HSC Voyager =

Condor ferries

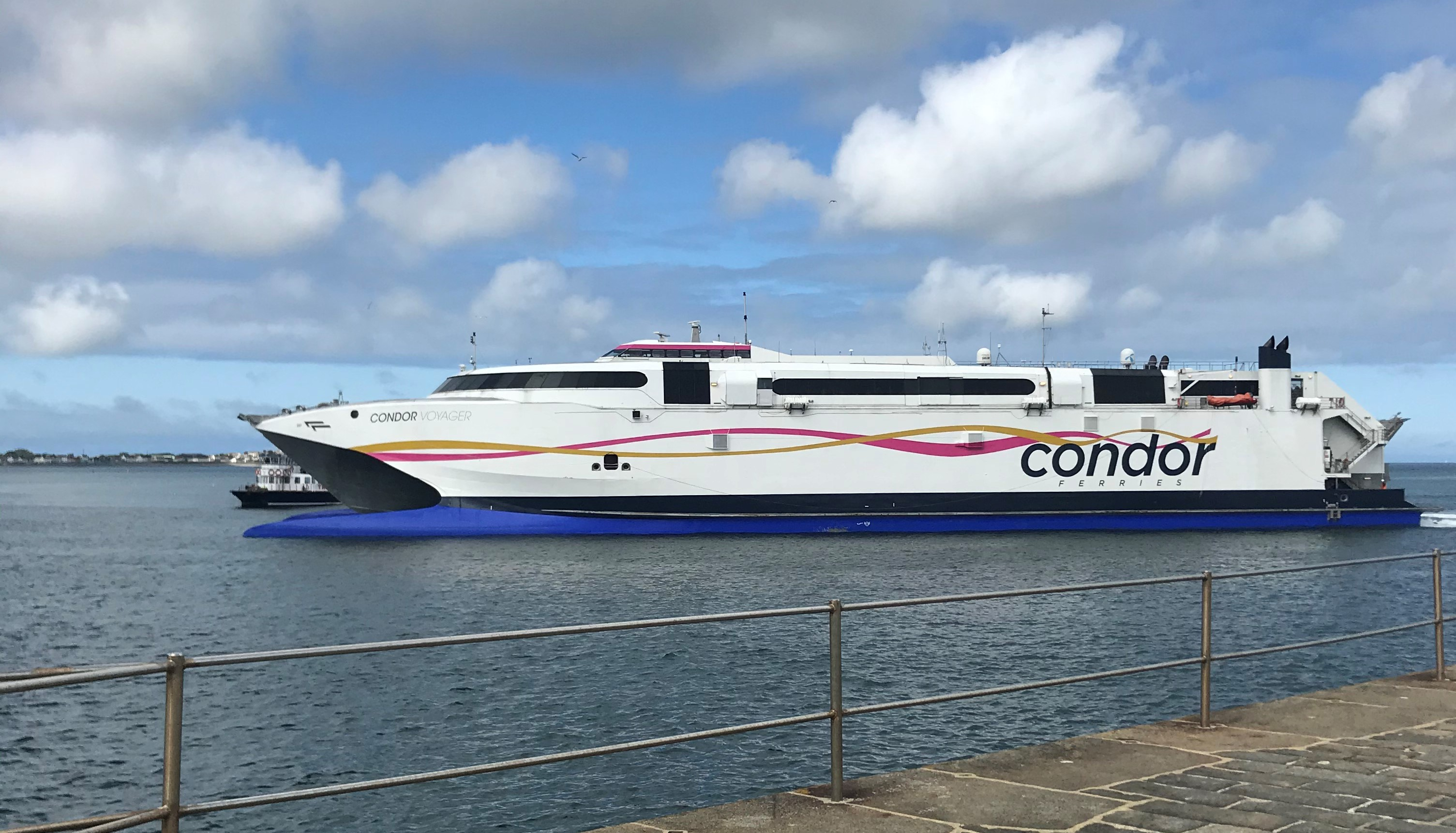
- Voyager as Condor Voyager in 2021

History
- Name: 2000: Incat Tasmania; 2000–2003: The Lynx; 2005–2021: Normandie Express; 2021–2025: Condor Voyager; 2025–present Voyager
- Owner: 2000: KiwiRail; 2000–2007: High Speed Catamarans B.V.; 2007–present: Brittany Ferries
- Operator: 2000–2005: Tranz Rail; 2005–2021: Brittany Ferries; 2021–2025: Condor Ferries; 2025–present : Brittany Ferries
- Port of registry: Nassau, Bahamas
- Route: St Malo–Guernsey–Poole; St Malo–Guernsey–Jersey (limited service)
- Builder: Incat, Tasmania, Australia
- Yard number: 057
- Launched: 29 July 2000
- Completed: 2000
- Identification: IMO number: 9221358
- Status: In service

General characteristics
- Tonnage: 6,581 GT
- Length: 97.22 m (319.0 ft)
- Beam: 26.6 m (87.3 ft)
- Draught: 3.43 m (11.3 ft)
- Decks: 2
- Installed power: 4 x Ruston 20RK270 (Each rated at 7080kW, coupled to a Reinjtes VLJ 6831 gearbox)
- Propulsion: 4 x Lips 120E waterjets
- Speed: 33 knots (service speed), 46.5 knots maximum
- Capacity: 850 passengers; 267 vehicles
- Crew: 30

Voyager is a high-speed catamaran ferry owned and operated by Brittany Ferries. Launched as Incat Tasmania in 2000 by Incat in Tasmania, Australia, she was first chartered to the Australian Trade and Investment Commission (Austrade) for the 2000 Summer Olympic Games, and later to Tranz Rail as The Lynx for the Interislander service. In 2005, she was chartered to Brittany Ferries as Normandie Express for services between Portsmouth and Cherbourg/Caen (Ouistreham), with the company then purchasing the ferry in 2007. In 2021, she was chartered to Condor Ferries as Condor Voyager for operations in the Channel Islands, before returning to Brittany Ferries in 2025 following their takeover of Condor, later renaming the vessel to Voyager.

== History ==
Voyager was built as Incat Tasmania at the Incat yards in Tasmania, Australia. Her first use was on charter to the Australian Trade and Investment Commission (Austrade) as a floating conference centre during the 2000 Summer Olympics in Sydney. Later that year, she was chartered to Tranz Rail for its Interislander service between Picton and Wellington. She was renamed The Lynx for this service and remained on the route until 2003 when she was returned to Incat.

=== Brittany Ferries ===
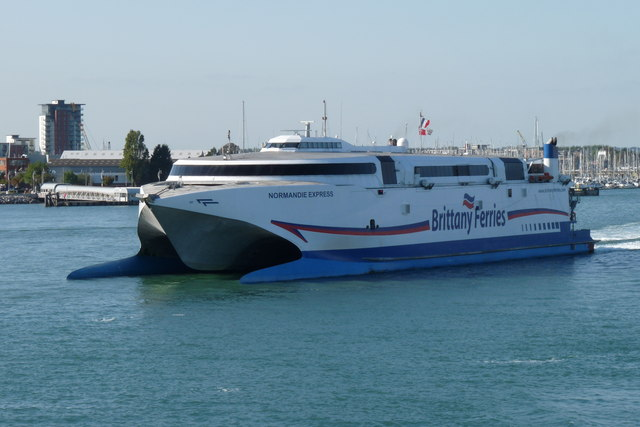
Normandie Express in 2009

In September 2004, P&O Ferries announced it was to withdraw their services from Portsmouth to France, Brittany Ferries later announced it would run a fastcraft service between Portsmouth and Cherbourg/Caen (Ouistreham) as a replacement and The Lynx was chartered. In January 2005, she was renamed Normandie Express and sailed for France, stopping off in Indonesia to drop off supplies and equipment for the tsunami relief effort.

Also on board for the trip to Europe was the French yacht Sill et Veolia which was being returned to France after being damaged whilst on the Vendée Globe round-the-world yacht race. After calling in at Roscoff to drop off the yacht and being shown off to Brittany Ferries management, she undertook berthing trials in Portsmouth, Cherbourg and Ouistreham before starting service in March 2005.

For her first year in service with Brittany Ferries, Normandie Express had a bridge and engine room crew supplied by Northern Marine and was registered in Nassau but protests from French trade unions meant that from 2006 she would fly the French flag and be registered in Caen with a full French crew. A further trade union dispute took place in 2015.

Brittany Ferries purchased the Normandie Express from Incat in 2007.

=== Charter to Condor Ferries ===
In July 2021, it was announced that Channel Island operator Condor Ferries was to use Normandie Express under charter agreements with Brittany Ferries. The vessel was renamed to Condor Voyager and replaced the Condor Rapide.

=== Return to Brittany Ferries ===
Following a new 15-year contract awarded to Brittany Ferries by the States of Guernsey and Jersey's decision to appoint DFDS Seaways, Condor Voyager was redeployed for a Guernsey-only operation in 2025, serving Saint-Malo and Poole, as well as a limited weekly service to Jersey. She was painted in the Brittany Ferries livery in November 2025 and renamed Voyager.
