= Incat =

Manufacturer of large high-speed craft catamarans

- Type: Private
- Industry: Shipbuilding
- Founded: 1977
- Founder: Bob Clifford
- Headquarters: Derwent Park, Tasmania, Australia
- Products: Wave-piercing catamarans
- Owner: Bob Clifford
- Website: www.incat.com.au

Incat is an Australian manufacturer of high-speed craft (HSC) catamaran ferries. Its greatest success has been with large, sea going passenger and vehicle ferries, but it has also built military transports and since 2015 it has built smaller river and bay ferries. Based in Derwent Park, a suburb of Hobart, Tasmania, Australia, it was founded by Bob Clifford.

The company builds vessels using aluminium construction, wave-piercing and water-jet technology. Vessels have been constructed up to 130 metres in length with a size of 13,000 gross tons or with cruising speeds of up to 58 knots (107 km/h).

== History ==
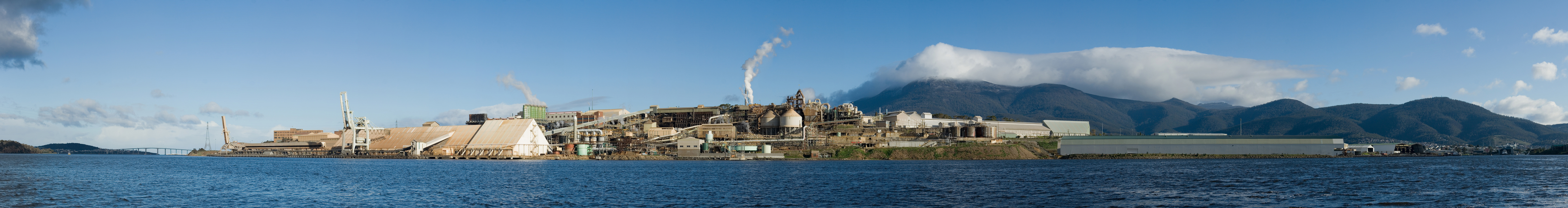
Incat's Hobart shipyard (to the right)

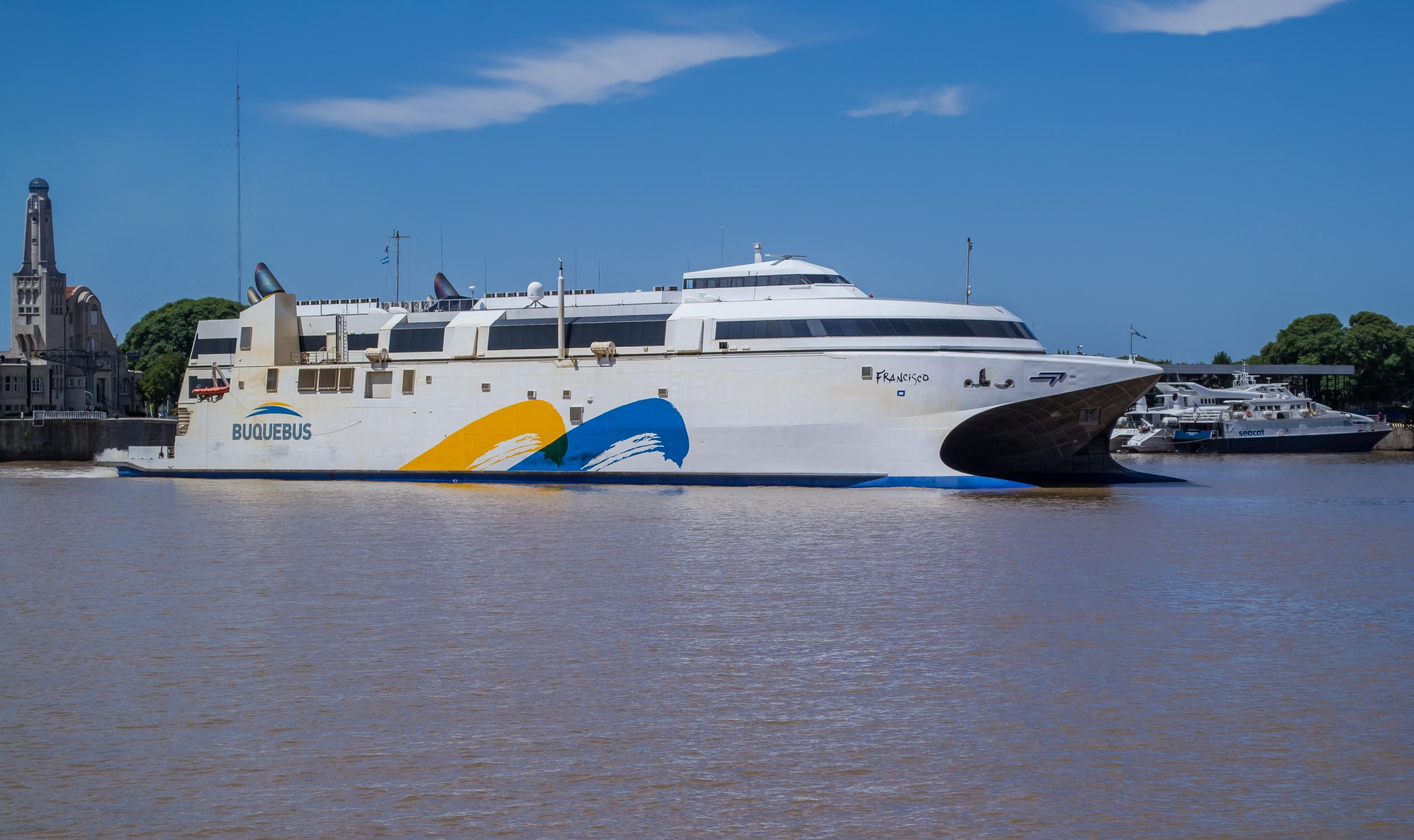
The 99m wave piercing catamaran HSC Francisco, delivered by Incat in 2013: the world's fastest ship in commercial service

The company began in 1972 as the Sullivans Cove Ferry Company in suburban Hobart and built four small ferries before International Catamarans was formed in 1977 by a partnership between founder Bob Clifford and marine architect Philip Hercus. This partnership created plans for what was probably the first large wave piercing catamaran in the world. However the partnership was dissolved in 1988 with Clifford remaining in Hobart trading as Incat Tasmania while Hercus returned to Sydney to establish Incat Designs, a design company that became Incat Crowther after a merger in 2005. Incat Crowther has no association with Incat Tasmania and its ships are built by other companies. Incat Tasmania has its own in-house design company, Revolution Design.

In 1989 Incat Tasmania moved to its present location on Prince of Wales Bay, which allowed it to build larger ships, and in 1990 Incat delivered its first 74-metre fast catamaran ferry. At the same time, several other companies also began to build large aluminium vehicle carrying ferries. This new type of ship was revolutionary due to their low weight and high speed, and over the next decade fast cats replaced most hydrofoil and hovercraft services as well as many monohull ferries. The success of this new type of ferry led to other shipbuilders around the world using their yards to build large vehicle carrying aluminium catamarans. However many ferry operators preferred traditional monohull designs, and the limited market for 'fast cats' became crowded with manufacturers bidding low to keep their shipyards working.

In August 2024, Incat purchased 12 hectares of land from Norske Skog to build a second shipyard with 3 halls on part of the Boyer Mill site. A new 120 by 40 metre production hall is underway at Prince of Wales Bay.

== Products ==
=== Large wave piercing passenger and vehicle ferries ===
In 1990 Incat was one of the pioneers of large, fast catamaran ferries and they have been its core product ever since. The type of ship was different from earlier ferries and its instant success led to Incat becoming a major player in the industry. Marine-grade aluminium alloys such as 5083 are critical in achieving the necessary low weight to reduce drag at higher speeds. Over the years innovation has led to the ships becoming bigger, faster, more fuel efficient and much more stable on rough seas. Vehicle decks are often movable to make way for high trucks or extra cars.

Ships in this category have been built from 74 to 130 metres long and from 3,000 to 13,000 gross tons. The 99-metre lng-powered HSC Francisco (Hull 069, on Río de la Plata for Buquebus) is the world's fastest ship in commercial service and can achieve speeds up to 58 knots (107 km/h; 67 mph).

=== Smaller passenger ferries ===
Incat began by building small ferries under 37 metres, but from 1990 it concentrated on larger vehicle-carrying catamarans. However, in 2015 the company resumed building smaller ferries and in that year it delivered river ferries for operation in London, Hobart and Sydney. Since then it has designed and built more smaller ferries including two 35-metre, 400 passenger ferries (Hulls 090 and 095) for commuter runs by Port Phillip Ferries from Melbourne Docklands to Portarlington and Geelong.

=== Military vessels ===
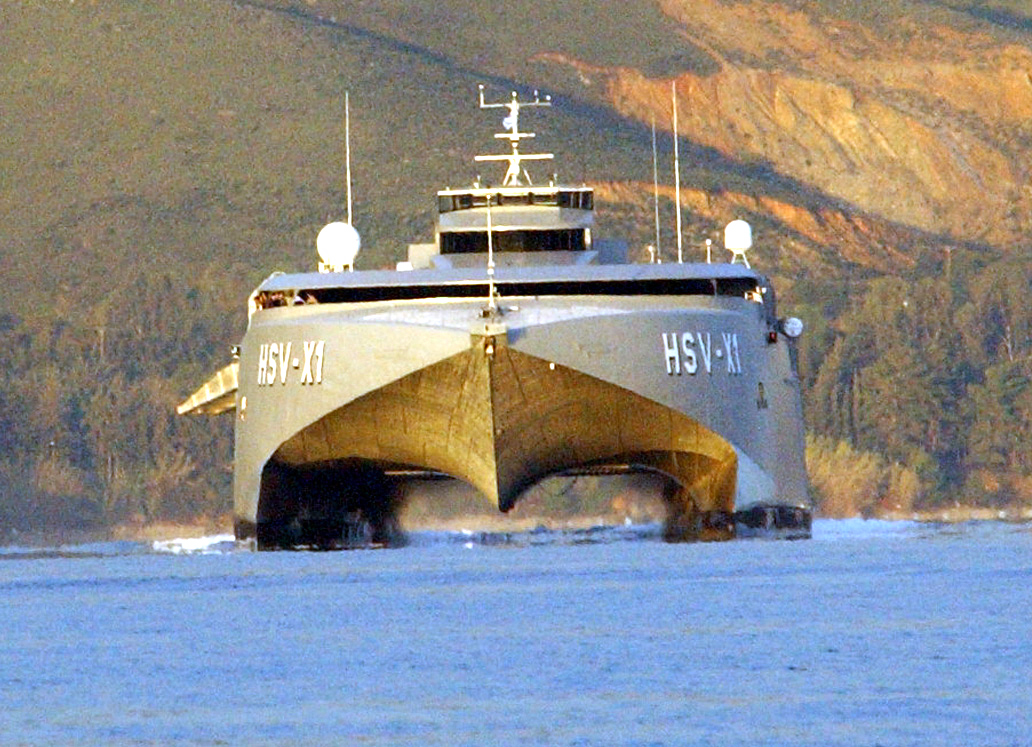
HSV-X1 near Crete

In the 1990s several catamarans built by Incat entered naval service as fast transports, including HMAS Jervis Bay with the Royal Australian Navy and HSV-X1Joint Venture, Spearhead and HSV-2 Swift, which served with the United States Armed Forces.

=== Other vessels ===
==== K class ====
In the mid-1990s Incat built three "K class" ferries. They are 70 to 80 metres long, low profile passenger vessels without wave piercing bows or the distinctive centre bow that characterise all other larger Incat ferries. Two were built by Incat in Hobart and a third was built by a Chinese partner. Plans for further Chinese built K class ferries did not eventuate and Hull NF08 remains the only Incat vessel not built in Hobart.

==== Oil rig tender ====
Most offshore oil rigs are exposed to rough open seas with crew transfers by helicopter and freight needs served by platform supply vessels. However Azerbaijan's offshore oil rigs are in the calmer waters of the Caspian Sea, the world's largest lake, so crew transfers can be comfortably and more economically undertaken by water. Several fast catamarans have been built to transfer both crews and cargo for this market including Incat Hull 074 Muslim Magomayev delivered in 2015. The size of catamarans that can be built for this niche market is restricted by the 16.5-metre width of locks on the Volga–Don Canal that connects the Caspian Sea with the Black Sea and the Mediterranean.

==== Brooke Street Pier ====
From 1990 Incat had almost exclusively built large catamarans, but this changed in 2014 when the company diversified into something that was not even a ship, although it did float. An earlier Brooke Street Pier ferry terminal on Hobart's waterfront needed replacement and Incat was commissioned to build an 80 x 20-metre floating pontoon. Hull 077 was towed eight kilometres from Incat's shipyard to Sullivans Cove before finishing work was done on site. In addition to ferry berths, the pier hosts a restaurant, a cafe and a number of stalls.

==== Luxury super yachts ====
The market for opulent motor yachts has grown rapidly in the 21st century and while the market is mostly for monohull vessels, catamarans are beginning to make inroads. Incat has released several designs ranging from 80 to 112 metres which are shown on their website.

== Deliveries ==
In its early years Incat built smaller boats and ferries with little to distinguish it from other boat yards except for a willingness to experiment and innovate. But the revolutionary Hull 023 completed in 1990 was quite different and was the first of the type of ferry that Incat is best known for today with its large capacity, high speed, wave piercing hulls and distinctive centre bow. As one of the first large aluminium vehicle carrying catamarans in the world, it contributed to the big changes in the ferry industry that occurred in the 1990s.

| Image | Hull no | Length / class | Gross tonnage | Delivered | Latest name | Operator | Notes |
|---|---|---|---|---|---|---|---|
| | 001 | 18m cat | | 1977 | Jeremiah Ryan | Unknown | |
| | 002 | 18m cat | | 1979 | James Kelly | Unknown | |
| | 003 | ??m cat | | 1980 | A. K. Ward | Derwent Sailing Squadron | |
| | 004 | 20m cat | | 1981 | Fitzroy | Unknown | |
| | 005 | 20m cat | | 1981 | Tangalooma | Unknown | |
| | 006 | 20m cat | | 1981 | Amaroo II | Unknown | |
| | 007 | 20m cat | | 1982 | Green Islander | Unknown | |
| | 008 | 20m cat | | 1982 | Quicksilver | Unknown | |
| | 009 | 29m cat | | 1982 | Spirit of Roylen | Unknown | |
| | 010 | 21m cat | | 1983 | Trojan | Unknown | |
| | 011 | 22m cat | | 1984 | Keppel Cat I | Unknown | |
| | 012 | ??m cat | | 1983 | Thunderbird | Unknown | |
| | 013 | 9 m cat | | 1982 | Little Devil | Unknown | launched 1984 |
| | 014 | ?? m cat | | 1984 | Pybus Rutherglen Punt | Unknown | |
| | 015 | ?? m yacht | | 1984 | Margaret Rintoul | Unknown | |
| | 016 | 27m cat | | 1985 | Spirit of Victoria | Unknown | |
| | 017 | 31m cat | | 1986 | Tassie Devil 2001 | Unknown | |
| | 018 | 23m cat | | 1987 | Starship Genesis | Unknown | |
| | 019 | 31m cat | | 1988 | 2000 | Unknown | |
| | 020 | 30m cat | | 1986 | Our Lady Patricia | Wightlink | Scrapped at Marchwood in 2008 |
| | 021 | 30m cat | | 1986 | Our Lady Pamela | Wightlink | Scrapped at Esbjerg in 2009 |
| | 022 | 37m cat | | 1988 | Sea Flight | Cruise Whitsundays | |
| | 023 | 74m WPC | 3,012 | 1990 | Cat | Seajets | The first large, aluminium, vehicle carrying catamaran built by Incat and one of the first in the world. Has operated in 3 continents |
| | 024 | 74m WPC | 3,454 | 1992 | Pinar del Rio | Baleària | Scrapped at Denia in 2019 |
| | 025 | 74m WPC | 3,003 | 1990 | High Speed Jet | Seajets | |
| | 026 | 74m WPC | 3,003 | 1991 | Caldera Vista | Seajets | |
| | 027 | 74m WPC | 3,003 | 1992 | Atlantic Express | Colonia Express | Río de la Plata |
| | 028 | 74m WPC | 3,003 | 1992 | Naxos Jet | Seajets | |
| | 030 | 74m WPC | 3,241 | 1993 | Tiger | Hanil Express | Formerly known as Condor 10 |
| | 031 | 74m WPC | 3,231 | 1993 | Mandarin | Dae-A-Gosok | Refitting at Busan |
| | 032 | 74m WPC | 4,994 | 1993 | Atlantic III | Buquebus | |
| | 033 | 78m WPC | 3,989 | 1994 | Jaume I | Baleària | |
| | 034 | 78m WPC | 3,989 | 1995 | Fares 2 | Maritime Company for Navigation, Saudi Arabia | Formerly Elanora operated by El Salam Maritime |
| | 035 | 78m WPC | 3,989 | 1995 | Mega Jet | Seajets | Last Incat vessel fitted with a bow door |
| | 036 | 70m K class | 1,760 | 1995 | Juan Patricio | Buquebus | |
| | 037 | 78m K class | 2,450 | | Montevideo Express | Colonia Express | |
| | NF08 | 80m K class | 2,357 | 1998 | Harmony Flower | H Ferry (DAE-A Express Shipping) Korea | Built in Panga, China under contract from Incat as part of a plan to build K class vessels there. Only one was built in China |
| | 038 | 81m WPC | 4,112 | 1996 | Jaume II | Baleària | |
| | 039 | | | 1996 | Solar Boat | Incat R&D craft | |
| | 040 | 81m WPC | 4,113 | 1996 | Elite Jet | Seajets | |
| | 041 | 81m WPC | 4,305 | 1996 | Jaume III | Baleària | |
| | 042 | 86m WPC | 5,005 | 1996 | Champion Jet 2 | Seajets | Formerly Condor Express for Condor Ferries. |
| | 043 | 86m WPC | 5,007 | 1997 | Tarifa Jet | DFDS Seaways | |
| | 044 | 86m WPC | 5,005 | 1997 | Champion Jet 1 | Seajets | Formerly Condor Vitesse for Condor Ferries |
| | 045 | 86m WPC | 5,007 | 1997 | Champion Jet 3 | Seajets | Formerly Condor Rapide for Condor Ferries and HMAS Jervis Bay |
| | 046 | 91m WPC | 5,617 | 1997 | T&T Express | Government of Trinidad & Tobago | Sank in Atlantic Ocean in April 2021 |
| | 047 | 91m WPC | 5,902 | 1998 | Superexpress | Golden Star Ferries | |
| | 048 | 91m WPC | 5,617 | 1998 | Eurochampion Jet | Seajets | Previously Cat-Link IV, Max Mols |
| | 049 | 91m WPC | 5,619 | 1998 | Eurochampion Jet 2 | Seajets | Previously Cat-Link V, Mads Mols, Master Cat, Fjord Cat, Skane Jet |
| | 050 | 96m WPC | 5,743 | 1998 | Manannan | Isle of Man Steam Packet Company | Previously HSV-X1 Joint Venture |
| | 051 | 96m WPC | 5,528 | 1999 | Giga Jet | Seajets | Previously Bonanza Express, Artemis, Poniente Jet |
| | 052 | 96m WPC | 6,346 | 1999 | Villa de Agaete | Ceuta Link | |
| | 053 | 96m WPC | 6,344 | 1999 | Bencomo Express | Fred Olsen Express | |
| | 054 | R&D craft | | | Wing | Incat | |
| | 055 | 96m WPC | 6,344 | 2000 | Bentago Express | Fred Olsen Express | |
| | 056 | 96m WPC | 6,360 | 2000 | Volcan de Teno | Baleària | Formerly Highspeed 6 at Hellenic Seaways |
| | 057 | 98m WPC | 6,581 | 2000 | Voyager | Brittany Ferries | |
| | 058 | 98m WPC | 6,554 | 2003 | Barlovento Express | Fred Olsen Express | |
| | 059 | 98m WPC | 6,464 | 2002 | Hai Xia Hao | Fujian Cross Straight Ferry | Operates between Taiwan and China. Formerly ran as The Cat from eastern USA to Canada and Bahamas |
| | 060 | 98m WPC | 6,581 | 2000 | T&T Spirit | Government of Trinidad & Tobago | Formerly the US military's USAV Spearhead |
| | 061 | 98m WPC | 6,581 | 2003 | HSV-2 Swift | United States Navy 2002–2013. In UAE service from 2015. Seajets 2017 - | Major damage to port bow after missile attack off Yemen in 2016. Towed to Greece for repairs. Not operational |
| | 062 | 98m WPC | 6,581 | 2006 | Volcan de Tirajana | Baleària | Formerly Milenium Tres at Acciona Trasmediterránea |
| | 063 | 17m cat | | 2006 | Sixty Three | 17m Project Pty Ltd | |
| | 064 | 112m WPC | 10,841 | 2007 | Tera Jet 2 | Seajets | |
| | 065 | 112m WPC | 10,715 | 2008 | Tera Jet 3 | Seajets | |
| | 066 | 112m WPC | 10,503 | 2009 | Express 1 | Molslinjen | Previously Norman Arrow, KatExpress 1 |
| | 067 | 112m WPC | 10,503 | 2013 | Express 2 | Molslinjen | Previously KatExpress 2 |
| | 068 | 85m WPC | 5,702 | 2015 | Levante Jet | DFDS Seaways | |
| | 069 | 99m WPC | 7,109 | 2013 | Francisco | Buquebus | Fastest ship in the world. Gas turbines on LNG |
| | 070 | 17m | | 2016 | Gwenhyfar | Privately owned | Cruising ketch |
| | 071 | | | 2011 | The Barge | Tas Marine Constructions | |
| | 072 | 15m | | 2011 | Lindoy | Stava Bat & Dykkerservice | Delivered to Norway 16 November 2011 |
| | 073 | 34m | | 2015 | MR-1 or Mona Roma | Navigators / Secheron Holdings for Museum of Old & New Art | Delivered 9 February 2015. Operates on Derwent River, Hobart |
| | 074 | 70m FCB | 1,439 | 2015 | Muslim Magomayev | Caspian Marine Services | Launched 2014, named after Muslim Magomayev |
| | 075 | 35m | 155 | 2015 | Galaxy Clipper | Thames Clippers | Entered service October 2015 |
| | 076 | 35m | 155 | 2015 | Neptune Clipper | Thames Clippers | Entered service October 2015 |
| | 077 | | | 2014 | Brooke Street Pier | Brooke Street Pier Development Corporation | Pier, completed November 2014 Displacement 4,200 tons (not Gross Tonnage) |
| | 078 | 24m | | 2015 | Ocean Tracker | Manly Fast Ferry | Entered service 23 December 2015 |
| | 079 | 24m | | 2015 | Ocean Wave | Manly Fast Ferry | Entered service 23 December 2015 |
| | 080 | 33m | | 2016 | Ocean Surfer | Manly Fast Ferry | Entered service March 2016 |
| | 081 | 33m | | 2016 | Ocean Flyer | Manly Fast Ferry | Entered service March 2016 |
| | 082 | 35m | | 2016 | Catherine Hamlin | Sydney Ferries | In service |
| | 083 | 35m | | 2017 | Fred Hollows | Sydney Ferries | Entered service 26 June 2017 |
| | 084 | 35m | | 2017 | Victor Chang | Sydney Ferries | In service |
| | 085 | 35m | | 2017 | Pemulwuy | Sydney Ferries | In service |
| | 086 | 35m | | 2017 | Bungaree | Sydney Ferries | In service |
| | 087 | 35m | | 2017 | May Gibbs | Sydney Ferries | Entered service December 2017 as Emerald 6, renamed January 2018 |
| | 088 | 109 m | 10,842 | 2017 | Express 3 | Molslinjen | Entered service June 2017. 1,000 pass, 417 cars. Previously KatExpress 3. |
| | 089 | 110 m | 9,044 | 2018 | St John Paul II | Virtu Ferries | For service in Malta, due to commence operations in March 2019. |
| | 090 | 35 m | | 2017 | Bellarine Express | Port Phillip Ferries | 405 passengers. In service on Port Phillip between Melbourne Docklands and Portarlington |
| | 091 | 111 m | 10,870 | 2019 | Volcán de Tagoro | Baleària | 35 knots cruising speed. 1,184 passengers, 390 cars, 595 lane metres of ro-ro cargo. Cost €74 million |
| | 092 | 33 metres | | 2018 | Ocean Adventurer | Manly Fast Ferry | |
| | 093 | 111 metres | | 2021 | Volcán de Taidía | Baleària | |
| | 094 | 100 metres | | 2021 | Buccoo Reef | Government of Trinidad and Tobago | Operates between Port of Spain and Scarborough |
| | 095 | 35 metres | | 2019 | Geelong Flyer | Port Phillip Ferries | Operates between Melbourne and Geelong complementing the earlier Melbourne to Portalington service |
| | 096 | 130 metres | 13,000 | 2026 | China Zorrilla | Buquebus | World's largest battery electric aluminium ship, 40 MWh battery, 226 cars, 2,100 passengers, operating between Argentina and Colonia Uruguay. |
| | 097 | 76 metres | 3000+ | 2022 | Santa Monica 1 | Seaworld Express Ferry | Operates between Jindo and Jeju in South Korea. 700 passengers and crew, 79 cars. |
| | 098 | 120 metres | | | . | Undisclosed | |
| | 099 | 76.7 metres | 3000+ | 2023 | El Dorado Express | Daezer | Operates between Pohang and Ulleungdo in South Korea at up to 50 knots |
Under construction
| | 100 | 78 metres | | 2026 | . | Undisclosed | 2.4 MWh Hybrid lithium-titanate battery electric |
| | 101 | 78 metres | | 2027 | . | Undisclosed | Hybrid battery electric powered |
| | 102 | 129 metres | | 2028 | . | Molslinjen | 46 MWh LFP battery electric for Aarhus-Odden |
| | 103 | 129 metres | | 2028 | . | Molslinjen | 46 MWh battery electric for Aarhus-Odden |
| | 104 | 129 metres | | 2029 | . | Molslinjen | 46 MWh battery electric for Aarhus-Odden |

In the "Length / class" field of the table WPC means the vessel is a wave piercing catamaran. The three K class vessels were a low profile design without the wave piercing bows and the capacity to carry fewer cars than traditional Incat designs.

In the competitive ferry industry, ships often change operators, especially in Europe. Other ferries have alternated between summer service in the northern and southern hemispheres every six months. Some Incat vessels of the 1990s have been operated by up to six shipping companies with regular name changes.

Gross tonnage is a measure of a ship's enclosed volume rather than its weight or displacement, so similar ships can have differing gross tonnages due to factors such as whether a viewing platform is fully enclosed or open to the weather.
