= Wave-piercing hull =

Hull with fine bow with reduced reserve buoyancy

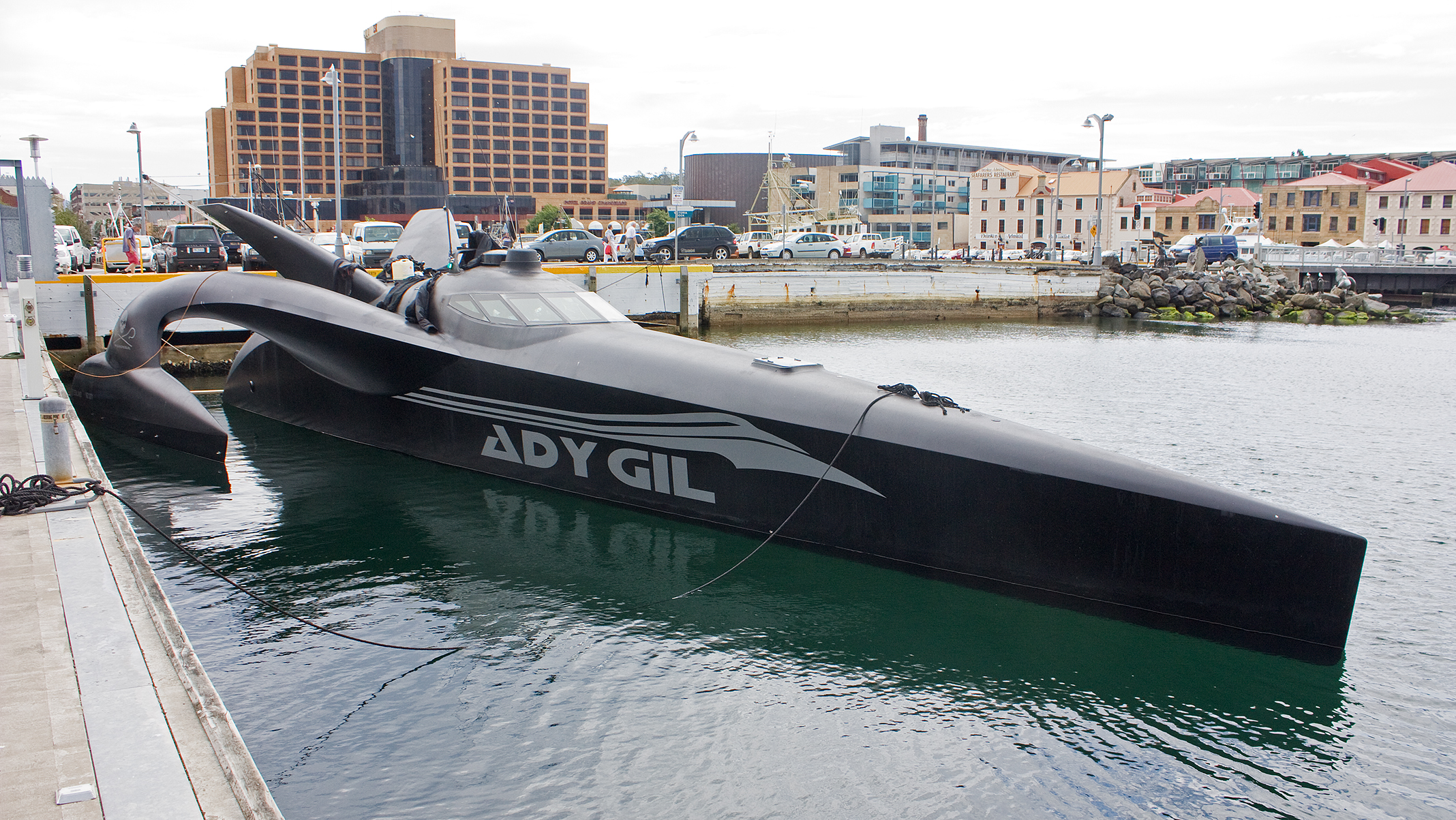
MY Ady Gil in 2009

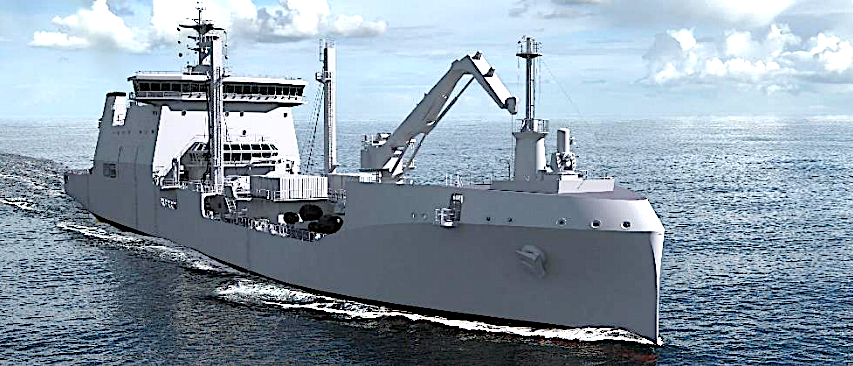
HMNZS Aotearoa

A wave-piercing boat hull has a very fine bow, with reduced buoyancy in the forward portions. When a wave is encountered, the lack of buoyancy means the hull pierces through the water rather than riding over the top, resulting in a smoother ride than traditional designs, and in diminished mechanical stress on the vessel. It also reduces a boat's wave-making resistance.

The physics of wave-making resistance calls for very long thin hulls, so in practice most are multi-hulls such as catamarans and trimarans.

The main current usage areas are passenger ferries and naval ships.

== See also ==
- Axe bow – Wave-piercing type of a ship's bow
- Bulbous bow – Protruding bulb at the front of a ship
- Earthrace – Wave-piercing power trimaran, 2006–2010, later renamed MY Ady Gil
- HMAS Jervis Bay (AKR 45)
- HSV-2 Swift – Hybrid catamaran built in 2003
- Incat – Manufacturer of large high-speed craft catamarans, a pioneer of the design
- Inverted bow – Bow whose furthest forward point is not at the top
- Norwegian Cruise Line Project Leonardo – Class of cruise ships built for Norwegian Cruise Line-Class Cruise Ships
- Tumblehome – Design element of ships and automobiles hull form
- Tuo Chiang-class corvette – Taiwanese class of war vessel
- Type 22 missile boat – Ship class in the Chinese People's Liberation Army Navy
- USA 17 – Racing trimaran: an America's Cup – Sailing race competition racing multihull
- USS Independence (LCS-2): high-speed trimaran warship
- Very Slender Vessel – Type of high-speed, wave-piercing craft
- Zumwalt-class destroyer – Stealth missile destroyer class of the US Navy
