= HSC Tiger =

Fast catamaran ferry, built 1992

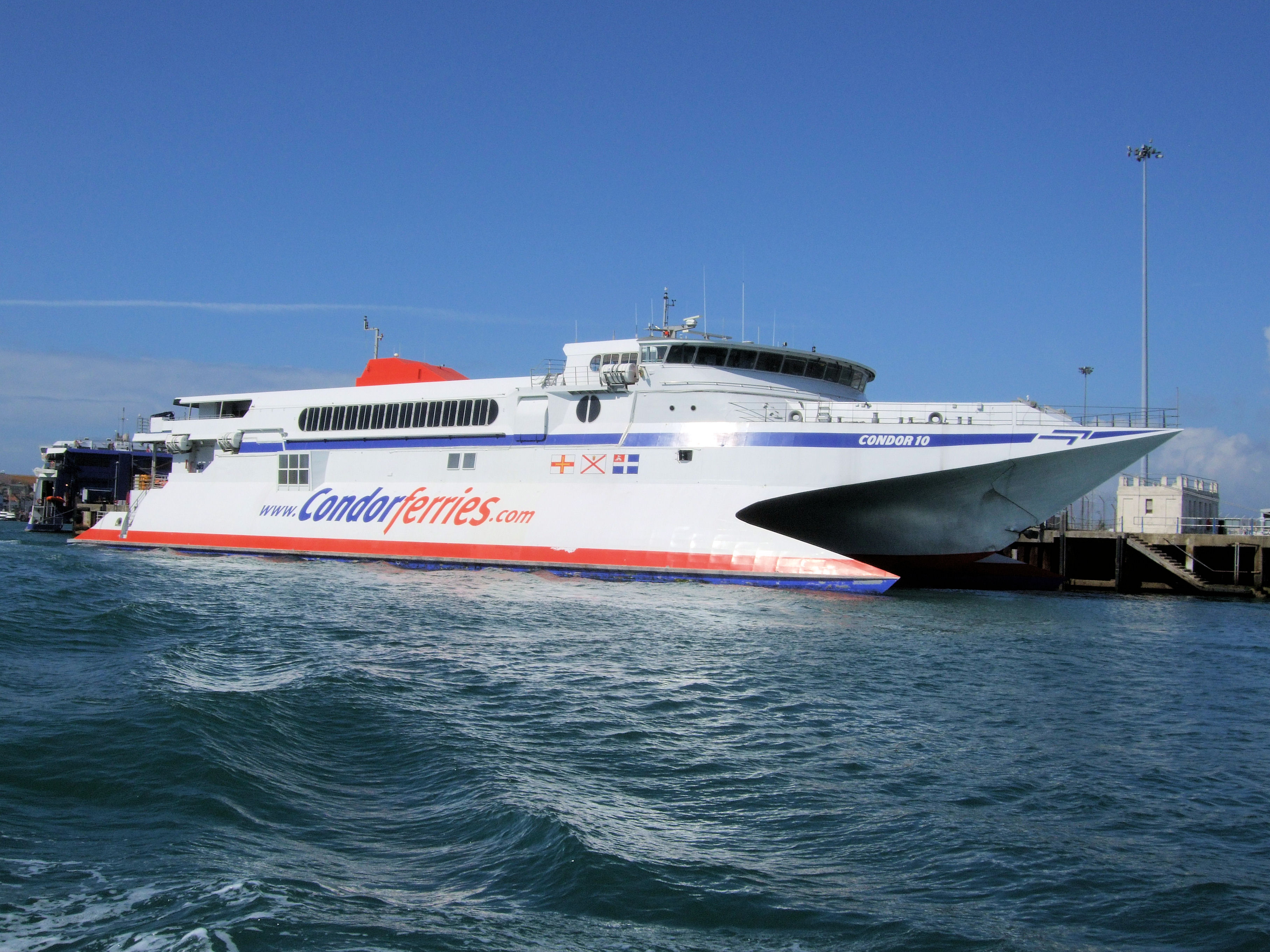
- Tiger as Condor 10 arriving at Weymouth Pier in 2010

History
- Name: 1993–2011: Condor 10; 2011–2018: Hanil Blue Narae; 2018: Jaguar; 2018–present: Tiger
- Owner: 1993–2004: Enterprise Trading Pte; 2004–2011: Condor Ferries; 2011–2018: Hanil Express; 2018: MH Marine; 2018–present: Tiger Shipping Co
- Operator: 1993–1994: Condor Ferries; 1994–1995: Tranz Rail; 1995: Viking Line; 1995–1996: Tranz Rail; 1996: Stena Line; 1996–1997: Tranz Rail; 1997: Holyman Sally Ferries; 1997–1999: Tranz Rail; 1999: Spirit of Tasmania; 2002–2011: Condor Ferries; 2011–2018: Hanil Express
- Builder: Incat, Tasmania
- Yard number: 030
- Laid down: 1 November 1991
- Launched: 30 September 1992
- Completed: 11 November 1992
- Maiden voyage: 1 April 1993
- Identification: IMO number: 9001526
- Status: Laid up

General characteristics
- Tonnage: 3,241 GT
- Length: 74.30 m (243.8 ft)}
- Beam: 26.00 m (85.3 ft)}
- Draft: 2.40 m (7.9 ft)}
- Installed power: 4x Ruston 16-cylinder 16RK270 M medium speed diesel engines
- Propulsion: 4 x Lips LJ115DX waterjet
- Speed: 37 knots (42 mph)
- Capacity: 580 passengers; 90 vehicles

HSC Tiger is a 74m fast catamaran ferry last operated by Hanil Express. She was built in 1992 by Incat, Hobart, Australia, as Condor 10 for Condor Ferries and first entered service in 1993. She has also served under the names Hanil Blue Narae and Jaguar.

== Concept and construction ==
In 1989, Condor Ferries announced plans for a £5 million 450 passenger catamaran to be delivered in April 1990. This was to be the largest catamaran of its type in the world, and would be known as Condor 9. Although delivery of Condor 9 was delayed until July 1990, this did not prevent Condor from announcing their intention to enter the car carrying ferry business with an order for a new large catamaran for the 1992 season.

The £40 million contract for the new Condor vessel had been due for signing in September 1990, but after Condor 9 had to be withdrawn only four days after entering service due to sea keeping problems and similar problems being experienced by Hoverspeed Great Britain, Condor opted to delay the order until the issues with Condor 9 had been resolved. The acquisition of a 50% share in Condor Ferries by the Australian logistics and transport company, TNT in 1992 saw the announcement of two new Condor 74 metre car carrying catamarans (one leased) constructed by Incat in Tasmania. An 87 metre craft was to follow in 1996.

== Service ==
=== 1993–1994: Condor Ferries ===
In the event only one of the three announced vessels joined the fleet, and Condor 10 entered service with Condor Ferries between Weymouth and the Channel Islands in April 1993 replacing the smaller passenger only Condor 9.

With Condor 10, Condor Ferries captured a significant share of the Channel Island passenger market which saw the announcement in January 1994 that, due to their substantial losses the previous season, British Channel Island Ferries (BCIF), which operated conventional ferry services to the Channel Islands from Poole, had been taken over by one of Condor's parent companies, Commodore Shipping. The former BCIF vessel Havelet ran a conventional ferry service from Weymouth from 1994, alongside the Condor 10.

Condor 10 continued to operate for Condor Ferries until October 1994.

=== 1994–1995: Tranz Rail ===
In October 1994, a Christchurch-based businessman, Brooke McKenzie, chartered HSC Albayzin from Buquebus to operate a fast ferry service in competition with the existing Tranz Rail Interislander service.

McKenzie's Sea Shuttles NZ offered a service on the Cook Strait with a crossing time of only one hour, compared to Interislander's three hour crossing time using conventional ferries. In December of that year therefore, Condor 10 arrived in New Zealand on charter to Tranz Rail for a new fast Interislander service. For this service the ship carried the marketing name The Lynx but her official name remained as Condor 10. Although the Sea Shuttles NZ ceased in February 1995, the popularity of the Interislander saw agreement that it would continue after the initial season.

=== 1995: Viking Line ===
In 1994, Finnish shipping company Viking Line commenced high speed ferry operations on their Helsinki to Tallinn route for the summer season using the Condor 9, chartered from Condor Ferries, and operating under the marketing name Viking Express. That first season was a success, bolstered the route’s popularity, and Viking Line sought a larger vessel for the 1995 season. Continuing the relationship between Viking Line and Condor Ferries, after completing her first successful summer season in New Zealand, Condor 10 entered service for Viking Line under the marketing name of Viking Express I in June 1995.

This charter began a pattern of the ship operating under charter in both hemispheres for their respective summer seasons which lasted until 1999.

=== 1995–1996: Tranz Rail ===
Condor 10 returned to New Zealand again for the 1995/1996 summer season.

=== 1996: Stena Line ===
Stena Sealink Line commenced their first high speed ferry operations on their Holyhead-Dún Laoghaire route in 1993 using Stena Sea Lynx. This operation was a success and for the 1994 season Stena Sea Lynx moved to open high speed services on the Fishguard-Rosslare route, being replaced at Holyhead by Stena Sea Lynx II.

By 1996, the company (now known as Stena Line UK) had transferred Stena Sea Lynx II to the Dover-Calais route, resulting in Stena Sea Lynx being required back at Holyhead and leaving no fast ferry to cover sailings from Fishguard. Stena Line chartered Condor 10 for the Summer to cover sailings to Rosslare under the marketing name The Lynx.

=== 1996–1997: Tranz Rail ===
She returned to New Zealand once again for the 1996/1997 summer season.

=== 1997: Holyman Sally Ferries ===
After a reported nine months of discussions, and the announcement that Regie voor Maritiem Transport (RMT) services were to cease in 1997, Ramsgate-based Sally Line announced in September 1996 a new joint venture with Holyman to be known as Holyman Sally Ferries. The joint venture, commencing in March 1997, was two-thirds owned by Holyman and one-third owned by the Sally parent company; Silja Line. Holyman were by now also joint-owners of Condor Ferries, TNT's 50% share having been spun-off and floated on the Australian Securities Exchange as Holyman in 1994. On her return from the Southern Hemisphere, Condor 10 therefore joined the Holyman Sally service between Ramsgate and Dunkerque.

The new service was not financially successful and 1997 would prove to be the firm's final year of operation on the route they had sailed since commencing services from Kent in 1981, with Condor 10 only seeing service until October 1997.

=== 1997–1999: Tranz Rail ===
After yet another season of operating in New Zealand in late 1997 early 1998, it was, once again, expected that Condor 10 would return to Condor Ferries, for a new service between Weymouth and Saint-Malo via Guernsey after Condor announced commencement of this service in July 1997 while she was sailing with Holyman Sally Ferries. During a sailing on 16 March 1998, not long before her usual return date, she suffered significant damage to her bow due to high waves and a breakwater collision. Instead of sailing back to the UK, she instead headed for Singapore for repairs.

After repairs were complete she sailed to Algeciras. A planned charter deal with Euroferrys to sail between Algeciras and North Africa did not go through and she sailed on to Weymouth where she was laid up until being required by Tranz Rail one final time.

After 1999, Condor Vitesse took Condor 10's place on the Interislander service and she was laid up in Wellington from mid July 1999.

=== 1999: Spirit of Tasmania ===
On 4 September 1999, the Spirit of Tasmania operating between Devonport and Melbourne for Spirit of Tasmania suffered a series of crankcase explosions whilst at sea, seeing her return to Devonport on only a single engine. Upon stripping down the engines, engineers found very heavily damaged pistons and metal fragments in her oil, which put her out of service.

With the required parts unavailable in Australia, the ferry company had to fly passengers home by aeroplane and charter replacement vehicles. With Condor 10 being in lay up in Wellington, she was chartered at short notice to provide cover, arriving in Tasmania on 11 September 1999. The price of the charter was reported to be AUD $23,000 per day.

Spirit of Tasmania was repaired by 21 September 1999 and returned to service, with Condor 10 heading to the Incat yard at Hobart to enter lay up. The whole situation, requiring charter vessels, flights and transport costs for engine parts from Germany had cost Spirit of Tasmania in the region of AUD $8.8 million.

In 2001, Condor 10 was refurbished by Incat, in preparation for a proposed sale to Bahrain-based Tylos Ferry to operate a route between the United Arab Emirates - Dubai - Kuwait, but this sale never took place.

=== 2002–2011: Condor Ferries ===
After years of lay up Condor 10 was chartered in 2002 for use once again by Condor Ferries, she was delivered to Poole where she was prepared for service. She was placed on the St Malo-Channel Islands run replacing Condor 9 once again. Condor's use of the Condor 10 on car carrying services to France from Jersey had an immediate effect on the incumbent operator, Emeraude Lines, with the decision by the States of Jersey seeing Emeraude in financial difficulties by October 2003. Emeraude would go on to file for protection from bankruptcy in France with debts of €4,000,000, be purchased by the Sogestran Group, and finally collapse in 2005 after a price war with Condor.

Condor 10 remained on the Saint-Malo-Channel Islands service until September 2010. On wintertime she was laid up in Weymouth, her place taken by one of the larger Condor fastcraft. In 2010, Condor 10 was replaced by the Condor Rapide.

In September 2010, Condor 10 was brought back into service to cover the Weymouth/ Channel Island routes while Condor Vitesse underwent repairs to two of her four engines, although it appears Condor 10 had engine issues of her own during this period. Once the Condor Vitesse was repaired, Condor 10 was once again retired and laid up in Weymouth.

=== 2011–2018: Hanil Express ===
In September 2011, Condor 10 was sold to the South Korean ferry company; Hanil Express. She sailed under a joint Condor and Hanil Express team to Busan in South Korea on a 25-day journey, where she commenced operations on the route between Wando - Jeju under the name Hanil Blue Narae.

In May 2018, she was sold by Hanil Express to MH Marine Co and renamed Jaguar, before being quickly resold to Tiger Shipping Co and renamed Tiger.

She was laid up in Dubai in 2021, before departing for Iran in March 2025, arriving at the port of Kish Island on 21 March 2025. She left Kish Island ten days later, but her location was lost upon leaving the Persian Gulf.

== Sister ships ==
Condor 10 was the seventh of seven sisters in the 74m Incat range, the others being:

Cat (originally Seacat Tasmania) was the first of the sisters built by Incat. She undertook a number of charters including for Tasmanian Ferry Services, Hoverspeed, Ferry Lineas Argentinas, SNAV, Emeraude Ferries and Isle of Man Steam Packet Company before being laid up for a number of years from 2007, she was sold to Seajets in 2014. She remains in lay-up in Avlida in Greece. She has also been variously known as SeaCat Calais, Atlantic II, SeaCat France, Emeraude France, Superfast Cat, Sea Speed Jet and HSC Cat.

High Speed Jet (originally Hoverspeed Great Britain) was launched as Christopher Columbus and renamed before delivery. She entered service in 1990 having taken the Hales Trophy for the fastest eastbound transatlantic journey on her delivery voyage to Falmouth, completing the journey, without passengers, in three days, seven hours and fifty-four minutes, averaging 36.6 knots (67.8 km/h; 42.1 mph). She sailed for Hoverspeed, Ferry Lineas Argentinas, Emeraude Ferries, Aegean Speed Lines and Idomeneas Lines as Hoverspeed Great Britain, Emeraude Great Britain Speedrunner 1 and Sea Runner, before being purchased by Seajets in 2011. She briefly entered service for them as Cosmos Jet before entering layup at Avlida in Greece and renamed High Speed Jet in 2015.

Caldera Vista (originally Hoverspeed France) was delivered to Hoverspeed in 1991. She remained in service with them until 1992 when she transferred to operations of Sardegna Express as Sardegna Express where she remained until 1993 before returning to Hoverspeed as Seacat Boulogne. In 1994 she entered service with Isle of Man Steam Packet Company as SeaCat Isle of Man before operating between 1996 and 1997 for Color Line as SeaCat Norge. She then returned to Steam Packet operation before a period operating with Irish Sea Express as Sea Express 1. She would go on to once again return to the Isle of Man Steam Packet as Snaefell, before moving to Seajets operations as Master Jet and then Caldera Vista. She was chartered to Africa Morocco Link but never entered service with them and remains in lay up.

Atlantic Express (originally Hoverspeed Belgium) was launched in February 1991, entering service with Hoverspeed in 1992 as Hoverspeed Boulogne. She passed into the operation of SeaCat from 1993 operating various routes as Seacatamaran Danmark and then Seacat Danmark. She was sold in 2004 and chartered to SNAV as Pescara Jet, then renamed as Zara Jet before reverting to Pescara Jet in 2006. She was sold to Golden Blaze Maritime in 2011 as Golden Blaze and has been in the operation and ownership of Colonia Express as Atlantic Express since 2015.

Naxos Jet (originally Seacat Scotland) was launched in October 1991, and was originally built for SeaCat's new fast ferry service between Stranraer and Belfast, although did briefly operate for Hoverspeed between Dover and Calais before commencing service on the North Channel. During the 1990s she operated a number of winter charters for Q Ships (as Q Ship Express) and Navegacion Atlantica before joining the Hoverspeed fleet in 2003. After a withdrawal from service in 2004, she was laid up for several years at the Pallion Yard, Sunderland. She has since operated for Fortune Maritime as Shikra and Al Huda II, NEL Lines as Cyclades Express and since 2016 has been part of the Seajets fleet as Naxos Jet.

Seacat Moorea (originally Stena Sea Lynx) was launched in February 1993 and originally purchased by Buquebus who immediately chartered her to Stena Sealink Line for their first high speed ferry operations, on their Holyhead-Dún Laoghaire route. The Stena Sea Lynx name was a play on the then company name Stena Sealink. She then moved to the Fishguard-Rosslare route from the 1994 seasons before returning to Holyhead at Stena Lynx in 1996. She then operated on various routes including Newhaven-Dieppe, Fishguard-Rosslare, Dover-Calais and Stranraer-Belfast before returning to her owners. She was briefly operated by Virtu Ferries as Avant before being laid up in Malta. In 2002 she was sold to South Korean shipping firm Dae-A Express Shipping Co. Ltd operating as Ocean Flower then Mandarin and then Seacat Moorea from 2008. She was sold to Cambodian interests in 2010.

There are also two other 74m hulls built by Incat, but these show clear differences to the seven 74m sister ships above. These are:

Pinar Del Rio (originally Patricia Olivia) was launched in 1992 and entered service in September of that year for her owners Buquebus. She undertook summer charters between Sweden and Gotland, first for Nordström & Thulin and then for their successors; Rederi AB Gotland. She was sold to Baleària in 2011 and renamed Pinar Del Rio. She remained in service with Baleària until when she ran aground off Denia after which she was deemed a total loss and dismantled in situ. She differed from her sisters in that she had modified passenger accommodation and forward windows.

Atlantic III (originally Juan L) was launched in June 1993, and entered service for Buquebus in November of that year. She operated between Buenos Aires - Punta del Este - Montevideo between 1993 and 1998. She was sold in 1998 to Navegación Atlántida S.A. and has since seen operation with Ferry Líneas Argentinas (N.A.S.A.). She presently operates again for Buquebus on their Buenos Aires - Colonia del Sacramento route. She differs from her sisters in that she has the appearance of an Incat 78m design.
