= HSC Pinar del Rio =

Incat fast ferry

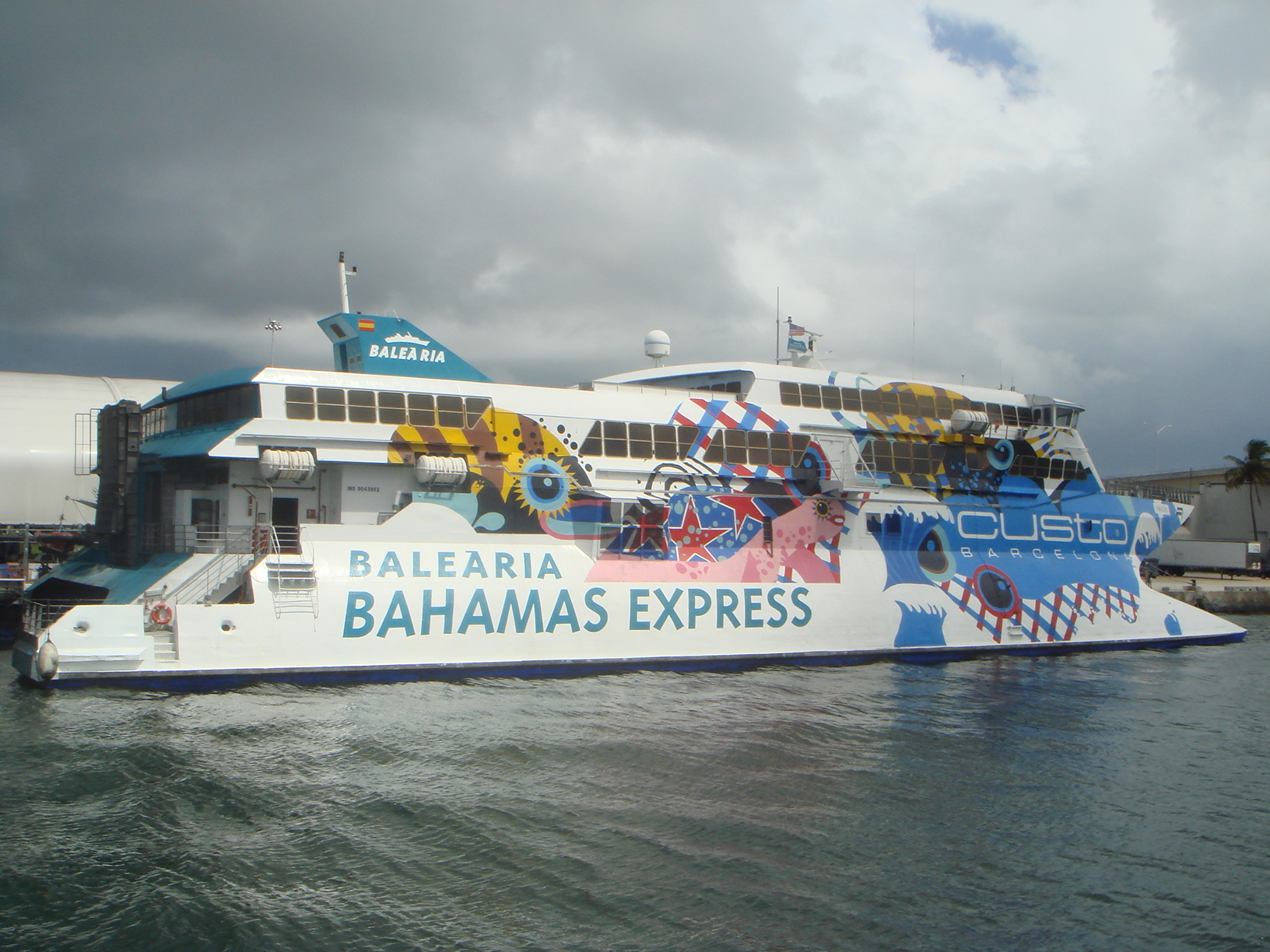
- Pinar del Rio at Port Everglades

History
- Name: (1992–2011): Patricia Olivia; (2011–2019): Pinar del Río
- Owner: (1992–2011): Buquebus; (2011–2019): Baleària
- Operator: (1992–2011): Buquebus; (1996–1997): Gotland Line (charter); (2011–2019): Baleària / Baleària Caribbean
- Port of registry: (1992–2011): Montevideo, Uruguay; (2011–2019): Palma, Spain; (2019): Limassol, Cyprus
- Route: Algeciras – Ceuta; Denia – Ibiza; Fort Lauderdale (USA) – Freeport (Bahamas)
- Ordered: 1990
- Builder: International Catamarans Australia Pty Ltd (Incat); Hobart, Tasmania, Australia
- Yard number: 024
- Laid down: 1 August 1991
- Launched: 16 February 1992
- Completed: July 1992
- Acquired: 2011
- In service: 1992
- Out of service: 16 August 2019
- Identification: IMO number: 9043952; Call sign: EAQM; MMSI number: 224778000
- Fate: Ran aground at Dénia, Spain, on 16 August 2019; declared a total loss and scrapped on-site.
- Status: Scrapped

General characteristics
- Class & type: Incat 74m wave-piercing catamaran
- Tonnage: 3,454 GT; 197 DWT
- Length: 73.60 m (241 ft 6 in)
- Beam: 26.00 m (85 ft 4 in)
- Draft: 3.10 m (10 ft 2 in)
- Decks: 3
- Ramps: Stern loading ramp
- Installed power: 4 × Ruston 16RK270 diesel engines (total 16,080 kW)
- Propulsion: 4 × Lips waterjets
- Speed: 37.0 knots (68.5 km/h; 42.6 mph) (service) 40.0 knots (74.1 km/h; 46.0 mph) (max)
- Capacity: 450 passengers; 84 cars

Pinar del Río was a 74-metre high-speed wave-piercing catamaran passenger and vehicle ferry operated by the Spanish shipping line Baleària. Built in Australia by Incat in 1992, the vessel spent her early career as Patricia Olivia operating high-speed links across the Río de la Plata for Buquebus, alongside seasonal European charters. Fully acquired and renamed Pinar del Río by Baleària in 2011, she served routes in the Balearic Islands, the Strait of Gibraltar, and international crossings between Florida and the Bahamas. Her career ended abruptly in August 2019 when she ran aground in Dénia, Spain, leading to her being declared a total loss and scrapped on-site.

== Service ==
The catamaran, the second of a series of nine sister units built by the specialized shipyard Incat of Hobart, was launched on 16 February 1992 with the name Patricia Olivia and delivered on 10 July to the Uruguayan Buquebus, from which it was transferred to Montevideo, which began to connect in September to Buenos Aires, between the two banks of the Río de la Plata. In the following years, the fast ferry continued to serve regularly the route between Uruguay and Argentina, until April 1996, when it was chartered to Nordström & Thulin, by which it was used from 15 April to 15 September on the routes between Nynäshamn and Visby, under the banner of the subsidiary Gotlandslinjen. This charter was repeated also the following year, in the same period. However, at the end of the second deployment in Sweden, in September 1997, the ferry did not return to South America, remaining instead laid up for about a month in the Landskrona shipyards, to then be transferred in October to the Strait of Gibraltar, where she took service on the connections between Algeciras and Ceuta, under the banner of the Spanish branch of Buquebus.

In 1998 she returned to charter on the connection to and from Gotland, this time on behalf of Rederi AB Gotland, resuming at the end of the season the service between Europe and Africa, which in January 2000 changed, with the transfer of the Andalusian port to Malaga. Nevertheless, nine months later, in September of the same year, the service was abolished and the fast unit laid up, remaining out of service until 2002, when it was reactivated.

In March 2008, approximately six years after its return to service in the Strait of Gibraltar, the catamaran was chartered to Baleària, from which it was moved on 13 June to the connections between Dénia and Ibiza, extended four days later to Palma de Mallorca. In February 2010 it was then purchased outright by the Spanish company. In the following months, the ferry continued to serve the connection between the continent and the Balearics, until May 2011, when it was renamed Pinar del Río and transferred to Port Everglades, which on 16 December began connecting to Freeport, under the banner of Bahamas Express, later known as Baleària Caribbean.

In 2016, after five years on the route, the Pinar del Río returned to the Mediterranean Sea, resuming the service to the Balearics, this time on the connections between Dénia and Sant Antoni de Portmany. On this very route, the catamaran was the victim of two accidents, one in the Ibiza port and the other in the Valencia port. In fact, in the first case, on 8 June 2018, the Pinar del Río collided with the breakwater, suffering minor damage to the bow, while in the second case, on 17 August 2019, it also collided with the breakwater, suffering serious damage below the waterline, which caused the vessel to partially sink, and was declared a total loss on 30 August, thus allowing its dismantling on site by the companies Ardentia Marina and Varadero Vinaròs.

== Sister ships ==
Pinar del Rio is one of a number of 74m catamarans built by Incat. She has seven half sisters which share the same design as each other:

Cat (originally Seacat Tasmania) was the first of the sisters built by Incat. She undertook a number of charters including for Tasmanian Ferry Services, Hoverspeed, Ferry Lineas Argentinas, SNAV, Emeraude Ferries and Isle of Man Steam Packet Company before being laid up for a number of years from 2007, she was sold to Seajets in 2014. She remains in lay-up in Avlida in Greece. She has also been variously known as SeaCat Calais, Atlantic II, SeaCat France, Emeraude France, Superfast Cat, Sea Speed Jet and HSC Cat.

High Speed Jet (originally Hoverspeed Great Britain) was launched as Christopher Columbus and renamed before delivery. She entered service in 1990 having taken the Hales Trophy for the fastest eastbound transatlantic journey on her delivery voyage to Falmouth, completing the journey, without passengers, in three days, seven hours and fifty-four minutes, averaging 36.6 knots (67.8 km/h; 42.1 mph). She sailed for Hoverspeed, Ferry Lineas Argentinas, Emeraude Ferries, Aegean Speed Lines and Idomeneas Lines as Hoverspeed Great Britain, Emeraude Great Britain Speedrunner 1 and Sea Runner, before being purchased by Seajets in 2011. She briefly entered service for them as Cosmos Jet before entering layup at Avlida in Greece and renamed High Speed Jet in 2015.

Caldera Vista (originally Hoverspeed France) was delivered to Hoverspeed in 1991. She remained in service with them until 1992 when she transferred to operations of Sardegna Express as Sardegna Express where she remained until 1993 before returning to Hoverspeed as Seacat Boulogne. In 1994 she entered service with Isle of Man Steam Packet Company as SeaCat Isle of Man before operating between 1996 and 1997 for Color Line as SeaCat Norge. She then returned to Steam Packet operation before a period operating with Irish Sea Express as Sea Express 1. She would go on to once again return to the Isle of Man Steam Packet as Snaefell, before moving to Seajets operations as Master Jet and then Caldera Vista. She was chartered to Africa Morocco Link but never entered service with them and remains in lay up.

Atlantic Express (originally Hoverspeed Belgium) was launched in February 1991, entering service with Hoverspeed in 1992 as Hoverspeed Boulogne. She passed into the operation of SeaCat from 1993 operating various routes as Seacatamaran Danmark and then Seacat Danmark. She was sold in 2004 and chartered to SNAV as Pescara Jet, then renamed as Zara Jet before reverting to Pescara Jet in 2006. She was sold to Golden Blaze Maritime in 2011 as Golden Blaze and has been in the operation and ownership of Colonia Express as Atlantic Express since 2015.

Naxos Jet (originally Seacat Scotland) was launched in October 1991, and was originally built for SeaCat's new fast ferry service between Stranraer and Belfast, although did briefly operate for Hoverspeed between Dover and Calais before commencing service on the North Channel. During the 1990s she operated a number of winter charters for Q Ships (as Q Ship Express) and Navegacion Atlantica before joining the Hoverspeed fleet in 2003. After a withdrawal from service in 2004, she was laid up for several years at the Pallion Yard, Sunderland. She has since operated for Fortune Maritime as Shikra and Al Huda II, NEL Lines as Cyclades Express and since 2016 has been part of the Seajets fleet as Naxos Jet.

Seacat Moorea (originally Stena Sea Lynx) was launched in February 1993 and originally purchased by Buquebus who immediately chartered her to Stena Sealink Line for their first high speed ferry operations, on their Holyhead-Dún Laoghaire route. The Stena Sea Lynx name was a play on the then company name Stena Sealink. She then moved to the Fishguard-Rosslare route from the 1994 seasons before returning to Holyhead at Stena Lynx in 1996. She then operated on various routes including Newhaven-Dieppe, Fishguard-Rosslare, Dover-Calais and Stranraer-Belfast before returning to her owners. She was briefly operated by Virtu Ferries as Avant before being laid up in Malta. In 2002 she was sold to South Korean shipping firm Dae-A Express Shipping Co. Ltd operating as Ocean Flower then Mandarin and then Seacat Moorea from 2008. She was sold to Cambodian interests in 2010.

Tiger (originally Condor 10) was built in 1992 and entered service for Condor Ferries in 1993, remaining with them until October 1994. She then operated a series of seasonal charters for the Tranz Rail Interislander service, alternating with periods operating during the northern hemisphere summer with Viking Line, Stena Sealink Line, Stena Line UK, Holyman Sally Ferries before being laid up in July 1999. A short charter to Spirit of Tasmania followed in 1999, after which she entered lay up, before returning to service with Condor Ferries in 2002. She remained in the Condor fleet until 2011, after which she was sold to the South Korean ferry company; Hanil Express whom she remained in service with as Hanil Blue Narae until 2018 before being sold to MH Marine Co and renamed Jaguar, before being quickly resold to Tiger Shipping Co and renamed Tiger. She was laid up in Dubai in 2021, before departing for Iran in March 2025, arriving at the port of Kish Island on 21 March 2025. She left Kish Island ten days later, but her location was lost upon leaving the Persian Gulf.

There is also one other 74m hull built by Incat, which again is a half sister to Pinar del Rio:

Atlantic III (originally Juan L) was launched in June 1993, and entered service for Buquebus in November of that year. She operated between Buenos Aires - Punta del Este - Montevideo between 1993 and 1998. She was sold in 1998 to Navegación Atlántida S.A. and has since seen operation with Ferry Líneas Argentinas (N.A.S.A.). She presently operates again for Buquebus on their Buenos Aires - Colonia del Sacramento route. She differs from her sisters in that she has the appearance of an Incat 78m design.
