= List of ship decommissionings in 1992 =

The list of ship decommissionings in 1992 includes a chronological list of all ships decommissioned in 1992.

	Operator	Ship	Flag	Class and type	Fate	Other notes
15 January	Silja Line	Wellamo	Finland	Cruiseferry	Rebuilt into Silja Festival	
31 January	Royal Navy	Cleopatra		Leander-class frigate	Sold as scrap in 1993	
January	Royal Navy	Minerva		Leander-class frigate	Sold as scrap in July 1993	
February	Wallenius Rederiet	Nils Holgersson	Sweden	Cruiseferry	Sold to SweFerry	Continued in TT-Line traffic
3 March	Silja Line	Svea	Sweden	Cruiseferry	Rebuilt into Silja Karneval	
30 March	Orient Line Pty Ltd	Orient Sun	Singapore	Cruise ship	Transferred to Wasa Line	Renamed Wasa Queen
11 April	United States Navy	Midway		Midway-class aircraft carrier	Storage	Bremerton, Washington
22 April	Royal Navy	Jupiter		Leander-class frigate	Sold as scrap	
April	Eckerö Linjen	Alandia	Finland	Ferry	Chartered to Corona Line	
May	Royal Navy	Ariadne		Leander-class frigate	Sold to Chile	Renamed General Baquedano
29 June	Hoverspeed	Hoverspeed France	Bahamas	WPC74 class fast ferry	Chartered to an unknown company	Renamed Sardegna Express
30 June	Royal Navy	Hermione		Leander-class frigate	Sold as scrap in 1997	
June	Corona Line	Alandia	Finland	Ferry	Returned to Eckerö Linjen traffic	
1 September	Sally Cruise	Sally Albatross	Finland	Cruise ship	Transferred to Silja Line	
11 October	Wasa Line	Fennia	Finland	Ferry	Chartered to Baltic Line	
1 November	Swansea-Cork Ferries	Celtic Pride	Poland	Ferry	End of charter from Polferries	Renamed Rogalin
19 November	United States Navy	Okinawa		Iwo Jima-class amphibious assault ship	Storage	Bremerton, Washington
4 December	Royal Navy	Juno		Leander-class frigate	Sold as scrap in 1994	
21 December	SweFerry	Nils Holgersson	Sweden	Cruiseferry	Laid up, sold to Brittany Ferries, 1993	Renamed Val de Loire
24 December	Viking Line	Diana II	Sweden	Cruiseferry	Chartered to TR Line	Owned by Rederi AB Slite
December	Unknown	Sardegna Express	Bahamas	WPC74 class fast ferry	End of charter, returned to Hoverspeed	Renamed SeaCat Boulogne

== Bibliography ==
- Friedman, Norman (2006). British Destroyers and Frigates, the Second World War and After. Annapolis, Maryland: Naval Institute Press. ISBN 1-86176-137-6.
