= Seacat =

Seacat or SeaCat may refer to:

- Seacat missile, a short-range surface-to-air missile system
- SeaCat (1992–2004), ferry company formerly operating from between Northern Ireland, Scotland and England
- The Sea-Cat, an imaginary monster from Flann O'Brien's novel An Béal Bocht
- Atlantic wolffish
- Sandra Seacat (born 1936), American actress and acting coach
- SeaCat Tasmania, former name of the ferry HSC Sea Speed Jet
- Sea Cat, a Dungeons & Dragons monster.
- Ariidae, a family of catfish sometimes called "sea cat" or "sea catfish".
- Black-tailed gull, a family of gulls sometimes called umineko ("sea cat" in Japanese) due to their cat-like calls.
- Umineko When They Cry, a visual novel often nicknamed "seacats" by fans due to the name (which refers to the black-tailed gull).
