= HSC Jaume II =

High-speed catamaran

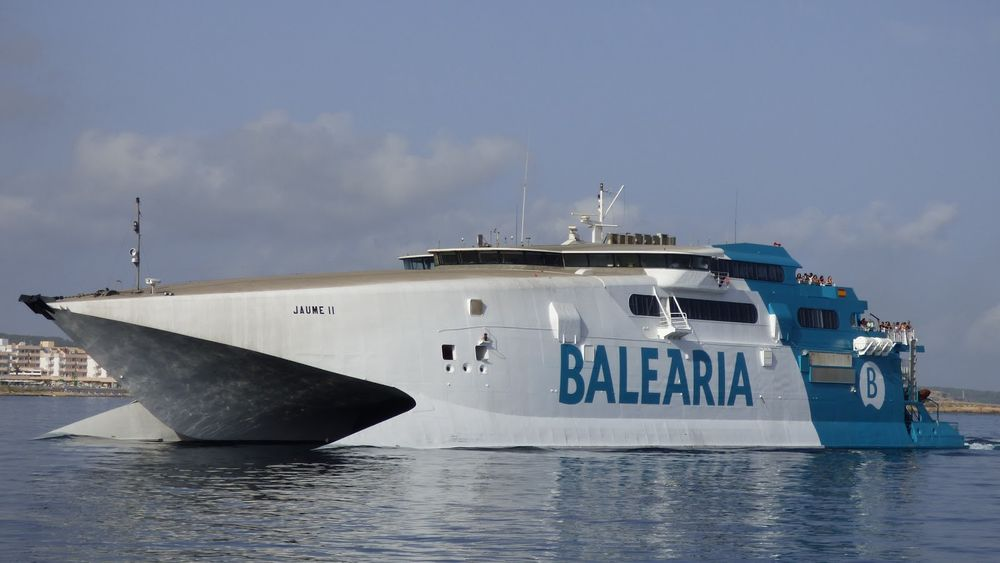
- Jaume II in Fort Lauderdale

History
- Name: 1996–1997: Condor 12; 1997–1998: Holyman Rapide; 1998–2005: Rapide; 2006–present: Jaume II
- Owner: 1996–1997: Condor Ferries; 1997–1998: Holyman; 1998–2001: Hoverspeed; 2001–2005: Sea Containers; 2005–2006: Hoverspeed; 2006–present: Baleària
- Operator: 1996–1997: Condor Ferries; 1997–1998: Holyman; 1998–2001: Hoverspeed; 2001–2005: Sea Containers; 2005–2006: Hoverspeed; 2006–present: Baleària
- Port of registry: Cyprus
- Route: Fort Lauderdale – Bimini / Freeport
- Ordered: 1995
- Builder: Incat (Tasmania, Australia)
- Yard number: 038
- Launched: 1996
- Completed: 1996
- Maiden voyage: 1996
- In service: 1996
- Identification: IMO number: 9116113
- Status: In service

General characteristics
- Tonnage: 4,305 GT
- Length: 81.15 m (266.2 ft)
- Beam: 26 m (85.3 ft)
- Draft: 3.15 m (10.3 ft)
- Installed power: 4 × 16-cylinder Ruston diesel engines
- Propulsion: 4 × Lips LJ145D waterjets
- Speed: 37 knots (69 km/h; 43 mph)
- Capacity: 654 passengers; 155 vehicles

Jaume II is an 81-metre high-speed wave-piercing catamaran ferry built in 1996 by Incat Tasmania (Hull 038). Originally entering service as Condor 12 on Channel Islands routes, she later operated under names including Holyman Rapide, Rapide, and SeaCat Rapide on various English Channel and Irish Sea services for Holyman and Hoverspeed. Acquired by Spanish operator Baleària in 2006 and renamed Jaume II, the vessel served Balearic island routes before undergoing a repowering refit in 2017 and being redeployed to Baleària Caribbean’s routes between Fort Lauderdale, Florida, and Bimini and Freeport in the Bahamas.

== History ==
The vessel entered service in 1996 as Condor 12. For her first season, she operated alongside Condor 10 on Condor Ferries Channel Island services. In 1997, the vessel was renamed Holyman Rapide and operated on the English Channel. When Hoverspeed acquired Holyman, the vessel became known as Rapide and continued service on Hoverspeed's English Channel routes.

In March 2001, Rapide was reassigned to Sea Containers Irish Sea services between Liverpool and Dublin, and Liverpool and Douglas.

From March 2002, Rapide operated between Belfast and Heysham and on routes to/from the Isle of Man until a fire occurred on 21 August 2002 during the 07:00 sailing. The fire, reported in the port engine room at 08:00, forced the vessel to return to Belfast. Passengers were offered alternative arrangements, and the service did not resume.

Rapide remained laid up in Belfast until repairs were completed by March 2003. With Seacat Scotland moving to the English Channel in November 2002, the Belfast–Troon route required a vessel, previously served by SeaCat Isle of Man.

On 1 November 2004, Rapide completed the Belfast–Troon service and occasionally covered Manx routes. She departed Belfast for the final time on 8 November 2004, bound for Sunderland.

In 2005, as Seacat Rapide, she operated between Dover and Calais for Hoverspeed until the company's closure on 7 November 2005. The vessel was subsequently laid up at Tilbury.

In June 2006, Rapide left the Channel for the Mediterranean, joining the Spanish shipping company Baleària and being renamed Jaume II.

In February 2016, four new main engines were installed at the Astilleros del Guadalquivir shipyard in Seville to reduce fuel consumption and NOx emissions and increase speed. At the same time, the ship's interior areas were upgraded and modernised.

As of 2019, Jaume II operates as a high-speed ferry between Fort Lauderdale, Florida, and Grand Bahama and Bimini in The Bahamas.

== See also ==
- SeaCat
- Incat
- High-speed craft
