= HSC Atlantic Express =

Catamaran launched in 1991

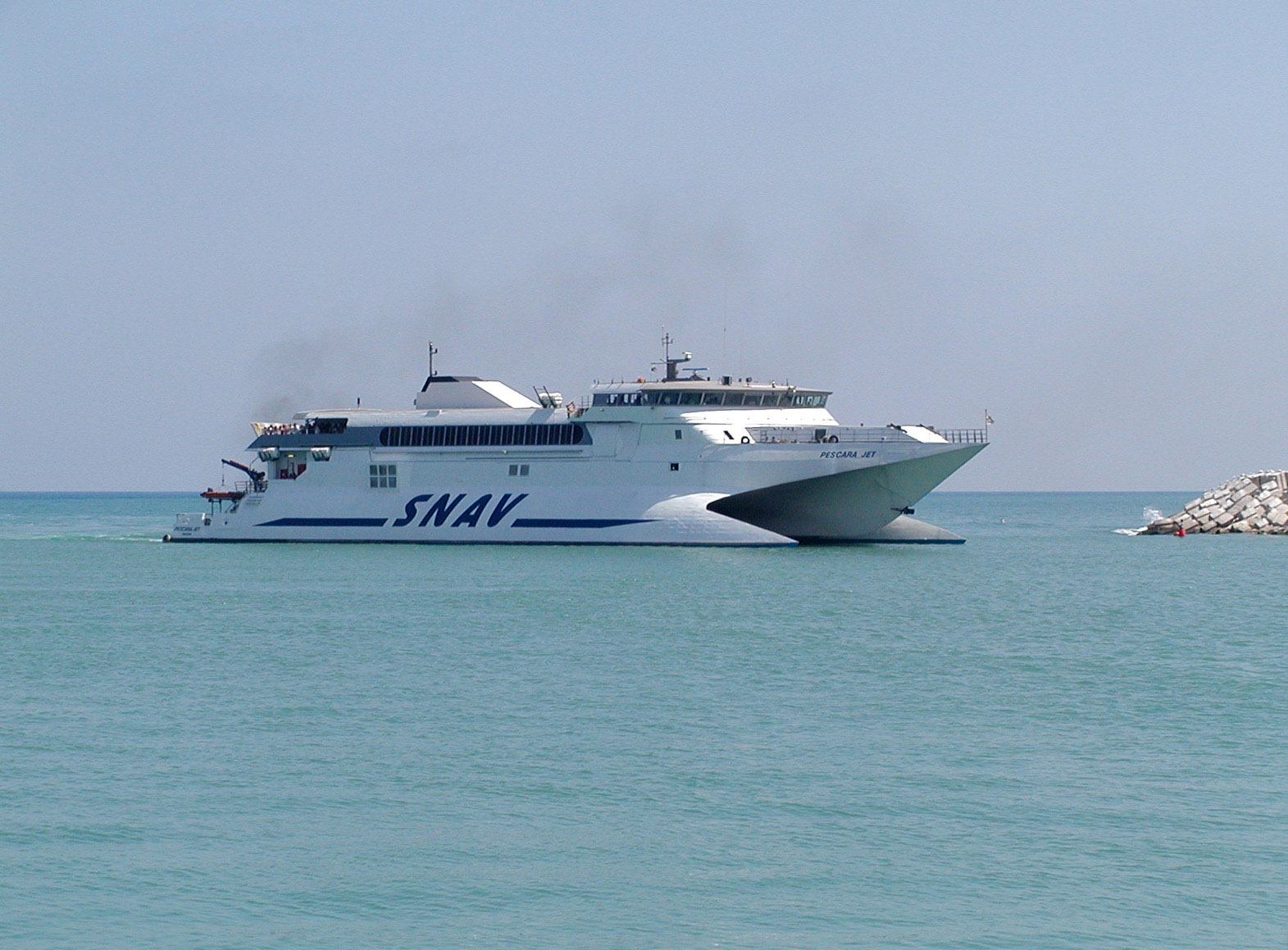
- Atlantic Express as Pescara Jet

History
- Name: 1992-1993: Hoverspeed Boulogne; 1993-1994: Seacatamaran Danmark; 1994-2004: Seacat Danmark; 2004-2005: Pescara Jet; 2005-2006: Zara Jet; 2006-2011: Pescara Jet; 2011-2015: Golden Blaze; 2015 onwards: Atlantic Express
- Operator: 1992-2004: Hoverspeed; 2004-2011: SNAV; 2011-2015: Golden Blaze; 2015 onwards: Colonia Express
- Port of registry: 1992-2004: United Kingdom; 2004-2011: Panama; 2011-2015: Greece; 2015 onwards: Uruguay
- Builder: Incat, Tasmania
- Yard number: 027
- Launched: 28 January 1991
- Identification: IMO number: 8919506

General characteristics
- Length: 73.6 m (241 ft)
- Beam: 26.3 m (86 ft)
- Draught: 2.5 m (8 ft 2 in)
- Installed power: 4 x Ruston 16RK270 diesel engines
- Propulsion: 4 x water-jets
- Speed: 37 knots (69 km/h; 43 mph)

Atlantic Express is a high speed catamaran operated by Argentinian ferry operator Colonia Express. She was launched on 28 January 1991 as Hoverspeed Boulogne. The vessel operates between Buenos Aires and Colonia del Sacramento.

== History and characteristics ==
Built in the Australian Incat shipyards in 1991, the catamaran is 77 metres long and 26 metres wide. It can carry 450 passengers and 85 cars at a speed of nearly 40 knots. The vessel operated for several Northern European shipping companies, such as Hoverspeed, Sea Containers, Color Line and Silja Line, and mainly served routes such as Calais - Dover or Liverpool - Belfast.

Owned by SNAV from 2004 to 2011, it was used in the summer months on the Adriatic route between Pescara - Split - Lesina. In the period 2004 - 2006 the catamaran changed its name to Zara Jet to return again with the name Pescara Jet from 2007. In 2011 it was sold to the company Golden Blaze Cruises taking the name of Golden Blaze.

In 2015 it was sold to the Argentine company Colonia Express who renamed it Atlantic Express.

== Sister ships ==
Atlantic Express was the fourth of seven sisters in the 74m Incat range, the others being:

Cat (originally Seacat Tasmania) was the first of the sisters built by Incat. She undertook a number of charters including for Tasmanian Ferry Services, Hoverspeed, Ferry Lineas Argentinas, SNAV, Emeraude Ferries and Isle of Man Steam Packet Company before being laid up for a number of years from 2007, she was sold to Seajets in 2014. She remains in lay-up in Avlida in Greece. She has also been variously known as SeaCat Calais, Atlantic II, SeaCat France, Emeraude France, Superfast Cat, Sea Speed Jet and HSC Cat.

High Speed Jet (originally Hoverspeed Great Britain) was launched as Christopher Columbus and renamed before delivery. She entered service in 1990 having taken the Hales Trophy for the fastest eastbound transatlantic journey on her delivery voyage to Falmouth, completing the journey, without passengers, in three days, seven hours and fifty-four minutes, averaging 36.6 knots (67.8 km/h; 42.1 mph). She sailed for Hoverspeed, Ferry Lineas Argentinas, Emeraude Ferries, Aegean Speed Lines and Idomeneas Lines as Hoverspeed Great Britain, Emeraude Great Britain Speedrunner 1 and Sea Runner, before being purchased by Seajets in 2011. She briefly entered service for them as Cosmos Jet before entering layup at Avlida in Greece and renamed High Speed Jet in 2015.

Caldera Vista (originally Hoverspeed France) was delivered to Hoverspeed in 1991. She remained in service with them until 1992 when she transferred to operations of Sardegna Express as Sardegna Express where she remained until 1993 before returning to Hoverspeed as Seacat Boulogne. In 1994 she entered service with Isle of Man Steam Packet Company as SeaCat Isle of Man before operating between 1996 and 1997 for Color Line as SeaCat Norge. She then returned to Steam Packet operation before a period operating with Irish Sea Express as Sea Express 1. She would go on to once again return to the Isle of Man Steam Packet as Snaefell, before moving to Seajets operations as Master Jet and then Caldera Vista. She was chartered to Africa Morocco Link but never entered service with them and remains in lay up.

Atlantic Express (originally Hoverspeed Belgium) was launched in February 1991, entering service with Hoverspeed in 1992 as Hoverspeed Boulogne. She passed into the operation of SeaCat from 1993 operating various routes as Seacatamaran Danmark and then Seacat Danmark. She was sold in 2004 and chartered to SNAV as Pescara Jet, then renamed as Zara Jet before reverting to Pescara Jet in 2006. She was sold to Golden Blaze Maritime in 2011 as Golden Blaze and has been in the operation and ownership of Colonia Express as Atlantic Express since 2015.

Naxos Jet (originally Seacat Scotland) was launched in October 1991, and was originally built for SeaCat's new fast ferry service between Stranraer and Belfast, although did briefly operate for Hoverspeed between Dover and Calais before commencing service on the North Channel. During the 1990s she operated a number of winter charters for Q Ships (as Q Ship Express) and Navegacion Atlantica before joining the Hoverspeed fleet in 2003. After a withdrawal from service in 2004, she was laid up for several years at the Pallion Yard, Sunderland. She has since operated for Fortune Maritime as Shikra and Al Huda II, NEL Lines as Cyclades Express and since 2016 has been part of the Seajets fleet as Naxos Jet.

Seacat Moorea (originally Stena Sea Lynx) was launched in February 1993 and originally purchased by Buquebus who immediately chartered her to Stena Sealink Line for their first high speed ferry operations, on their Holyhead-Dún Laoghaire route. The Stena Sea Lynx name was a play on the then company name Stena Sealink. She then moved to the Fishguard-Rosslare route from the 1994 seasons before returning to Holyhead at Stena Lynx in 1996. She then operated on various routes including Newhaven-Dieppe, Fishguard-Rosslare, Dover-Calais and Stranraer-Belfast before returning to her owners. She was briefly operated by Virtu Ferries as Avant before being laid up in Malta. In 2002 she was sold to South Korean shipping firm Dae-A Express Shipping Co. Ltd operating as Ocean Flower then Mandarin and then Seacat Moorea from 2008. She was sold to Cambodian interests in 2010.

Tiger (originally Condor 10) was built in 1992 and entered service for Condor Ferries in 1993, remaining with them until October 1994. She then operated a series of seasonal charters for the Tranz Rail Interislander service, alternating with periods operating during the northern hemisphere summer with Viking Line, Stena Sealink Line, Stena Line UK, Holyman Sally Ferries before being laid up in July 1999. A short charter to Spirit of Tasmania followed in 1999, after which she entered lay up, before returning to service with Condor Ferries in 2002. She remained in the Condor fleet until 2011, after which she was sold to the South Korean ferry company; Hanil Express whom she remained in service with as Hanil Blue Narae until 2018 before being sold to MH Marine Co and renamed Jaguar, before being quickly resold to Tiger Shipping Co and renamed Tiger. She was laid up in Dubai in 2021, before departing for Iran in March 2025, arriving at the port of Kish Island on 21 March 2025. She left Kish Island ten days later, but her location was lost upon leaving the Persian Gulf.

There are also two other 74m hulls built by Incat, but these show clear differences to the seven 74m sister ships above. These are:

Pinar Del Rio (originally Patricia Olivia) was launched in 1992 and entered service in September of that year for her owners Buquebus. She undertook summer charters between Sweden and Gotland, first for Nordström & Thulin and then for their successors; Rederi AB Gotland. She was sold to Baleària in 2011 and renamed Pinar Del Rio. She remained in service with Baleària until when she ran aground off Denia after which she was deemed a total loss and dismantled in situ. She differed from her sisters in that she had modified passenger accommodation and forward windows.

Atlantic III (originally Juan L) was launched in June 1993, and entered service for Buquebus in November of that year. She operated between Buenos Aires - Punta del Este - Montevideo between 1993 and 1998. She was sold in 1998 to Navegación Atlántida S.A. and has since seen operation with Ferry Líneas Argentinas (N.A.S.A.). She presently operates again for Buquebus on their Buenos Aires - Colonia del Sacramento route. She differs from her sisters in that she has the appearance of an Incat 78m design.
