= Jaume II =

Jaume II (Catalan for "James II") may refer to:

- James II of Aragon, king from 1285 to 1295
- James II of Majorca, king from 1276 to 1311
- James II of Urgell, count from 1408 to 1413
- HSC Jaume II, a Spanish high-speed ferry
