= Jaume III =

Jaume III (Catalan for "James III") may refer to:

- James III of Majorca, king from 1324 to 1344
- HSC Jaume III, a Spanish high speed catamaran
