= HSC Jaume III =

Catamaran launched in 1996

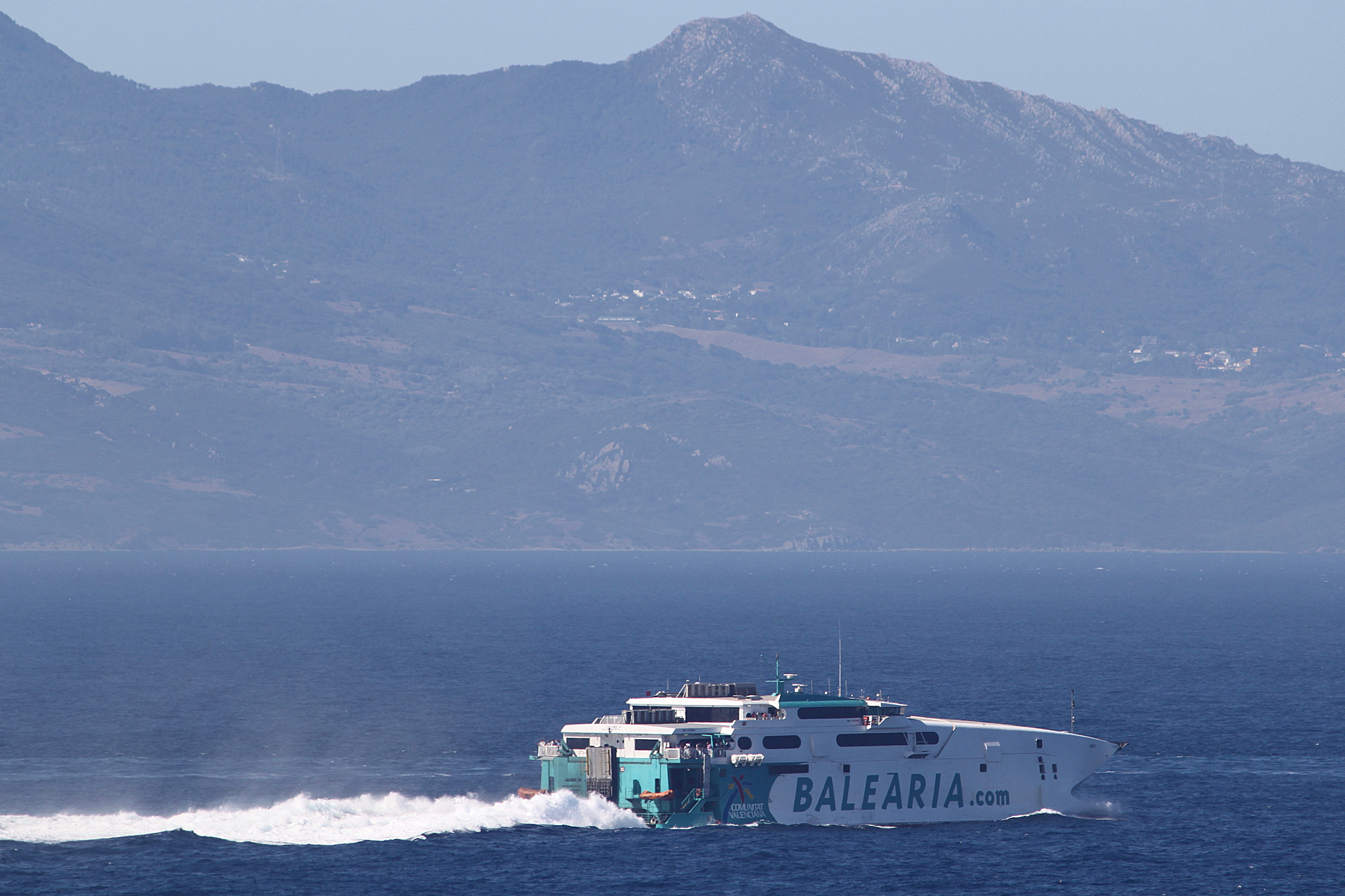
- Jaume III

History
- Name: 1996: Incat 041; 1996-1997: Holyman Express; 1997-1998: Holyman Diamant; 1998-2004: Diamant; 2004-2006: Seacat Diamant; 2006 onwards: Jaume III
- Operator: 1997-1998: Holyman Sally Ferries; 1998-2005: Hoverspeed; 2006: Isle of Man Steam Packet; 2006 onwards: Baleària
- Route: Ciutadella - Alcúdia
- Builder: Incat, Tasmania
- Yard number: 041
- Launched: 24 August 1996
- Identification: IMO number: 9135884
- Status: In service

General characteristics
- Tonnage: 4,305 GT
- Length: 81.15 m (266.2 ft)
- Beam: 26 m (85.3 ft)
- Draught: 3.00m (9.8 ft) approx in salt water
- Installed power: 4x Ruston 20-cylinder 20RK270 MkII High Efficiency Marine Diesel Engines
- Propulsion: 4 x Lips LJ135D waterjets
- Speed: 40 knots (46 mph)
- Capacity: 650 passengers; 180 vehicles

Jaume III is a high speed catamaran operated by Spanish ferry operator Baleària. She was launched on 24 August 1996.

== Construction ==
Jaume III was built in 1996 by Incat in Australia as Incat 041, and is one of a series of wave-piercing catamarans to be constructed by the company.

== Service ==
=== 1997-1998: Holyman Sally Ferries ===
In September 1996, after a reported nine months of discussions, and the announcement that Regie voor Maritiem Transport (RMT) services were to cease in 1997; Sally Line announced a new joint venture with Holyman to be known as Holyman Sally Ferries. The joint venture, commencing in March 1997, was to deploy two Incat 81-metre catamarans, on the route to between Ramsgate and Ostend, and was two-thirds owned by Holyman and one-third owned by the Sally parent company, Silja Line.

In October 1996 Incat 041 was sold to Holyman, and renamed Holyman Express. After completion and sea trails she was renamed again as Holyman Diamant before entry into service on 1 March 1997. The Holyman Sally venture was not financially viable and Holyman became partners with Hoverspeed and announced they were moving the service to Dover in March 1998 as Holyman Hoverspeed Ltd.

=== 1998-2005: Hoverspeed ===
The ship was renamed Diamant prior to entering service for Hoverspeed in March 1998 on the Dover-Ostend route. She would later operate on the Newhaven-Dieppe route from 2001, before temporarily covering service between Douglas-Liverpool-Dublin in March 2003.

In April 2004 she returned to Dover to operate a high speed route to Calais, before being renamed again to Seacat Diamant. She continued to run this route until Hoverspeed ceased operations in November 2005 when she undertook the last sailing on November 7 before heading for a period of layup in Tilbury and Falmouth.

=== 2006: Isle of Man Steam Packet ===
In 2006 she was chartered to the Isle of Man Steam Packet to provide additional capacity during the Isle of Man TT festival, largely on the Douglas-Heysham route during May and June.

=== 2006-Present: Baleària ===
Hoverspeed sold the ship in June 2006 and she commenced sailings for Baleària in July, between Palma-Barcelona.

During service with Baleària she has also served on the Algeciras-Ceuta, Algeciras-Tangier, Ibiza-Palma De Mallorca and Ciutadella-Alcúdia routes, the latter of which she serves as of 2025.

== Accidents and incidents ==
- On 9 March 1997, collided with Sally Star in Ramsgate harbour, suffering damage to the bow.
- On 6 January 2002, collided with Northern Merchant in fog off Dover. No one was injured and there was minor damage to both ships.
- On 12 July 2019, collided with Alcantara Dos in the port at Alcúdia, suffering minor damage.

== See also ==
- SeaCat
- Incat
- High-speed craft
