= Colonia Express =

Uruguayan passenger transport company

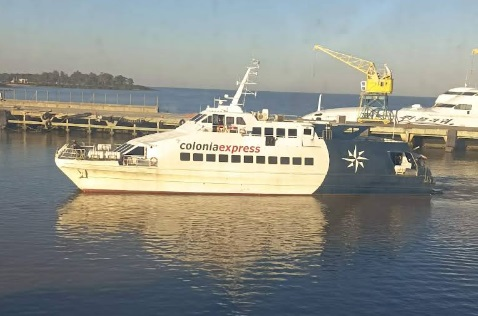
- Passenger ferry
- Predecessor: Remolcadores Unidos Argentinos
- Founder: Sebastián Planas
- Headquarters: Buenos Aires, Argentina
- Area served: River Plate
- Services: Passenger&vehicle transportation
- Owner: Lumary S.A.
- Number of employees: 250
- Website: []

Colonia Express S.A. is a Uruguayan company that operates ferry services on the River Plate, between Buenos Aires and Colonia del Sacramento, with duty-free shopping. The company operates three hotels and coach services to Montevideo, Punta del Este and Carmelo.

== History ==
The company was Remolcadores Unidos Argentinos (bought from Buquebus in 1998) and became Colonia Express in 2007.

The company competes with Buquebus for a market of 2.5—2.9 million people per year who travel across the River Plate, of which 2.1 million people go via Colonia del Sacramento in Uruguay. As of 2019, Colonia Express had 38% market share, increasing to 53% by 2025.

As of 2019, most customers came via Buenos Aires, including many tourists from abroad. By including cargo, the company adjusted its seasonality of 70% annual revenue coming in five months of the year, to 60%.

== Fleet ==
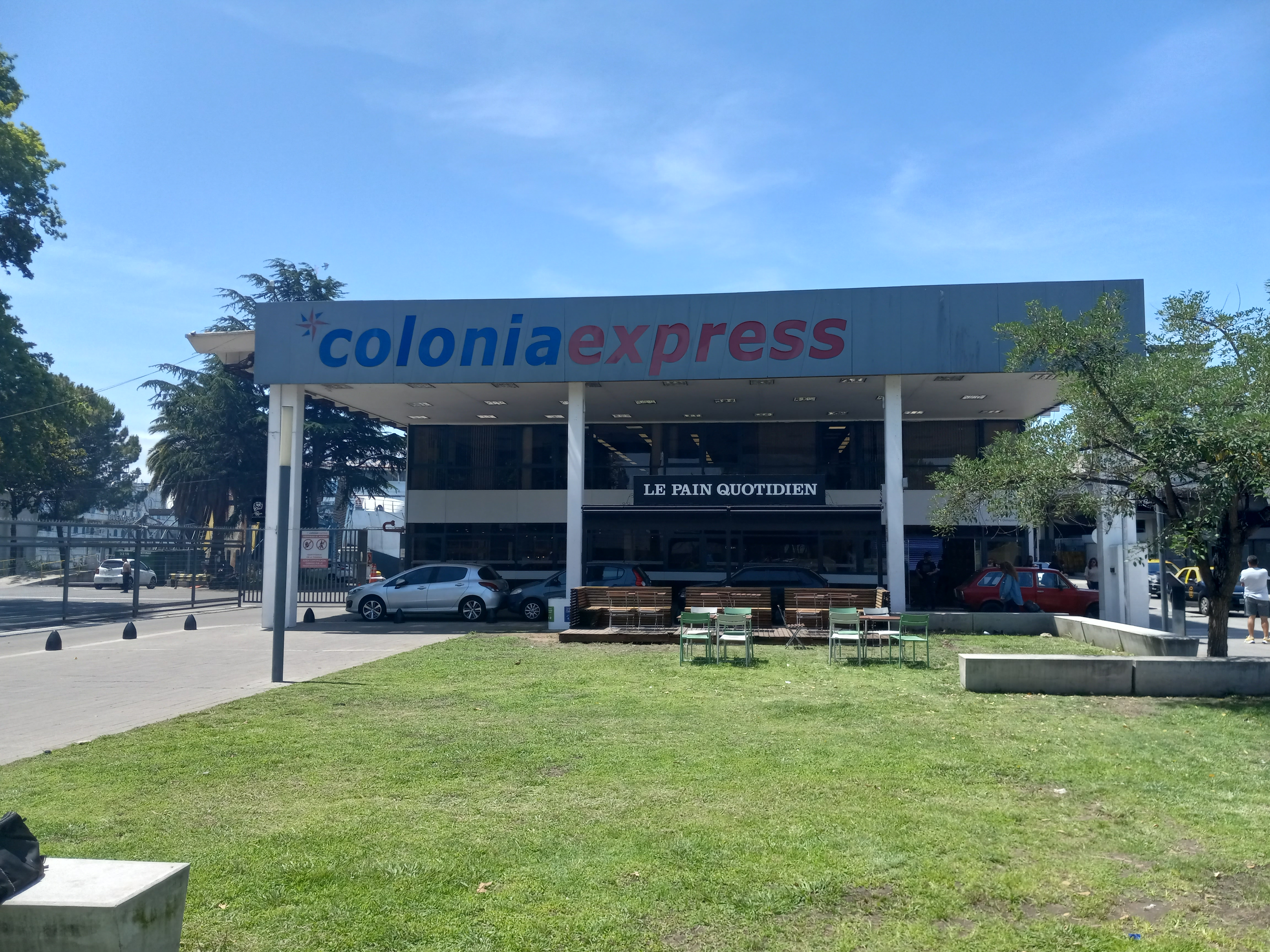
Colonia Express in Buenos Aires

Colonia Express operates a fleet of three fast ferries on the 30-nautical-mile (56 km; 35 mi) river route between Buenos Aires and Colonia del Sacramento.

Ship	Built	Service years	Route	Speed (knots)	Tonnage	Flag	Notes
HSC Atlantic Express	1991	2015-	Buenos Aires - Colonia	37	3,000 GT	Uruguay	
HSC Superferry Express	2019	2019-	Buenos Aires - Colonia	40	2,116 GT	Uruguay	Partially built in Argentina
