= Holyman (company) =

Australian ferry operator

- Company type: Public (ASX HLN)
- Founded: 1994
- Defunct: 2000
- Fate: Acquired by Lang Corporation
- Headquarters: South Melbourne, Australia
- Area served: Global
- Key people: Dick Austen (chairman); Chris Butcher (managing director)

Holyman was an Australian company that operated cargo ships and ferries in Australia and other countries. The company had three divisions; Domestic shipping and transport services, Ferries and Bulk commodity handling.

The company was founded in 1994 when the Shipping and Development Division of TNT was spun-off and floated on the Australian Securities Exchange. Assets in the original float included a gas pipeline, a coal loading terminal, bulk ore carriers, bulk sugar carriers, a 50% interest in Condor Ferries, and premium commuter ferry service, Express Navigation in New York.

Not long after the float, the company expanded its presence in the fast ferry industry by taking a 75% stake in Cat-Link, a start-up ferry operation in Denmark. The fast car ferry revolutionised transport in Denmark, and the start-up took at 25% market share during its first summer season.

In the same year, it redeployed one of its fast ferries to New Zealand during the Northern Winter / Southern Summer, operating from Wellington to Picton.

The company also expanded its US holdings by acquiring a stake in Catalina Cruises, which operated ferries between Long Beach and Avalon in California. To take that holding, Holyman devised an innovative ownership approach, delivering effective financial and management control, while still remaining within the highly restrictive Jones and Passenger Services Acts, laws that prevent foreign ownership of US Domestic shipping interests. The intention was to replicate that structure in investment in other lucrative US domestic ferry opportunities.

In September 1996, after a reported nine months of discussions, Holyman announced a new joint venture with Sally Line to be known as Holyman Sally Ferries. The joint venture, commencing in March 1997, was to deploy two of Holyman's 81-metre catamarans on the route to Belgium, and was two-thirds owned by Holyman and one-third owned by the Sally parent company; Silja Line. It replaced the conventional vehicular ferry with a fast Incat built ferry.

For a brief time, at its apogee, Holyman was the world's leading fast vehicle ferry operator.

The Holyman Sally route was unable to attract sufficient revenue to make the service profitable. Weather conditions and technical issues with the Incat vessel also hampered operations, and ten months after Holyman Sally commenced, the company was in trouble. The poor financial performance of Holyman Sally was almost identical to financial projections prepared during the early analysis of the route's viability by Holyman's development team but these early analyses were dismissed as being too conservative, and the Managing Director pressed on with the project. Holyman closed the Holyman Sally service and instead became partners with Hoverspeed and moved the service to Dover in March 1998 as Holyman Hoverspeed Ltd.

At the same time, marketing inertia from local management, coupled with technical and environmental issues, meant Cat-Link also began to lose money.

In July 1999, Adsteam made a takeover offer for Holyman. In October 1999, Lang Corporation made a counter takeover offer that was successfully completed in 2000. It was delisted from the Australian Securities Exchange on 25 January 2000.

== History ==
- 1994: Founded when the Shipping and Development Division of TNT was spun-off
- 1995: Acquired Townsend Deliveries
- 1995: Commenced Cat-Link fast car ferry operation between Aarhus and Kalundborg in Denmark
- 1996: Acquired 50% stake in Catalina Cruises, Long Beach, California
- 1997: Commenced joint fast car ferry operation with Sally Line
- 1998: 50% stake in Condor Ferries sold to Commodore Shipping
- 1999: 50% stake in Holyman Hoverspeed joint venture sold to Sea Containers
- 1999: American ferry operator Express Navigation sold to Sea Containers
- 2000: Holyman acquired by Lang Corporation
