= Hoverspeed =

Former British hovercraft ferry operating company

- Industry: Passenger transportation
- Predecessor: Seaspeed & Hoverlloyd
- Founded: 25 October 1981
- Defunct: 7 November 2005
- Fate: Closed
- Headquarters: Dover, England
- Area served: English Channel
- Key people: Geoffrey Ede, Managing Director
- Number of employees: 530 (Permanent); 350 (Seasonal)
- Parent: 1981-1984: British Rail and Broströms Rederi AB; 1986-2005: Sea Containers

Hoverspeed was a ferry company that operated on the English Channel from 1981 until 2005. It was formed in 1981 by the merger of Seaspeed and Hoverlloyd. Its last owners were Sea Containers; the company ran a small fleet of two high-speed SeaCat catamaran ferries in its final year.

Hoverspeed played a part in developing the hovercraft, and ran six SR.N4 Mountbatten class hovercraft and one SEDAM N500 Naviplane. Hoverspeed last operated hovercraft on its Dover to Calais service. They were withdrawn on 1 October 2000 and Hoverspeed continued to use Seacat catamarans built by Incat.

== History ==
=== Background and early attempts to consolidate operations ===
During the early 1970s, when both Hoverlloyd and Seaspeed were struggling to return a profit, the two operators had been in negotiations on a partnership to amalgamate operations. However, management at Hoverlloyd was not convinced the UK government would sanction any form of arrangement between Seaspeed and a foreign company. The situation was exacerbated when discussions became public knowledge and plans for a consortium were quickly abandoned.

=== Loss-making company ===
In late 1981, when the two companies eventually merged, the situation was dire. Despite a valuation at £110 million, combined losses were £8 million with ticket prices 25 to 30% higher than the ferries. Under the terms of the merger, Hoverspeed was also under obligation to accept the two French hovercraft in exchange for a 10% participation in share capital by French state-owned SNCF. The new company was spearheaded by Gerry Draper, new Chief Executive and a former marketing director at British Airways. Draper had been involved in filling empty passenger seats aboard the new Boeing 747 jumbo jets in the early 1970s when IATA regulations prohibited discounting. He was also successful in turning Concorde services profitable.

Nevertheless, a number of early decisions plagued the new company. First, Hoverspeed inherited an antiquated reservation system which was inadequate, resulting in potential travellers having great difficulty in contacting Hoverspeed and many being told crossings were fully booked when they were not. This necessitated the reversion to a very basic manual reservation system to try to cope with demand. In 1982, loss income was estimated at between £3 million and £4 million. Second, excess capacity drove profit margins down. The most damaging mistake was to increase the number of crossings operated, over 10,000 in 1982, which did not match demand and the decision to briefly re-open the Ramsgate route for the summer season which was counter-productive. Third, parity pricing continued with ferry operators, even during peak season. This was a source of concern since 70% of the turnover (and traffic) was generated during the summer season between mid-June and mid-September.

Despite carrying 2.5 million passengers and 400,000 vehicles, a 21% market share, with 35% fewer flights and 250 staff made redundant, the new entity continued to register losses with £5.5 million for the year 1982, £3.5 million in 1983. The new French hovercraft, the N500, achieved only 60% reliability and did not meet ride comfort or control standards. It was eventually broken up for spares and scraps. The SR.N4 craft, moreover, could not accommodate the recently introduced double-deck and one-and-a-half deck coaches and this part of the market was lost. By 1984, the company was near collapse.

=== Management buy-out ===
In February 1984, the UK government refused to provide further guaranteed loans, British Rail sold its 50% ownership which it had retained in the company (and its losses) for a nominal sum of £1 to a syndicate consortium of 5 directors. Thus, Hoverspeed was effectively given away to its own management and was wholly owned within the private sector backed by merchant bank Kleinwort Benson providing guarantees and underwriting the cash needed to operate via NatWest.

Hoverspeed Ltd Profit/Loss (1984–1990)
Year	Turnover (£)	Profit/Loss (£)	Margin of Profit (%)
1984	£28,590,000	(-£621,000)	(-2.1%)
1985	£33,083,000	£194,000	0.5%
1986	£34,698,000	£625,000	1.8%
1987	£42,334,000	£1,637,000	3.8%
1988	£44,062,000	£4,775,000	10.8%
1989	£46,070,000	£2,490,000	5.4%
1990	£49,121,000	(-£7,973,000)	(-16.2%)

The company immediately adopted premium instead of parity pricing, justified on the grounds that a faster service was expected to be more expensive. An aggressive advertising campaign was mounted against the ferries and more effort was made to target fares accurately. For 1984, the company made a loss of £621,000. Its performance went up with a pre-tax profit of £194,000 for 1985 with an increase in US passengers. This figure rose to £625,000 in 1986.

=== Purchase by British Ferries ===
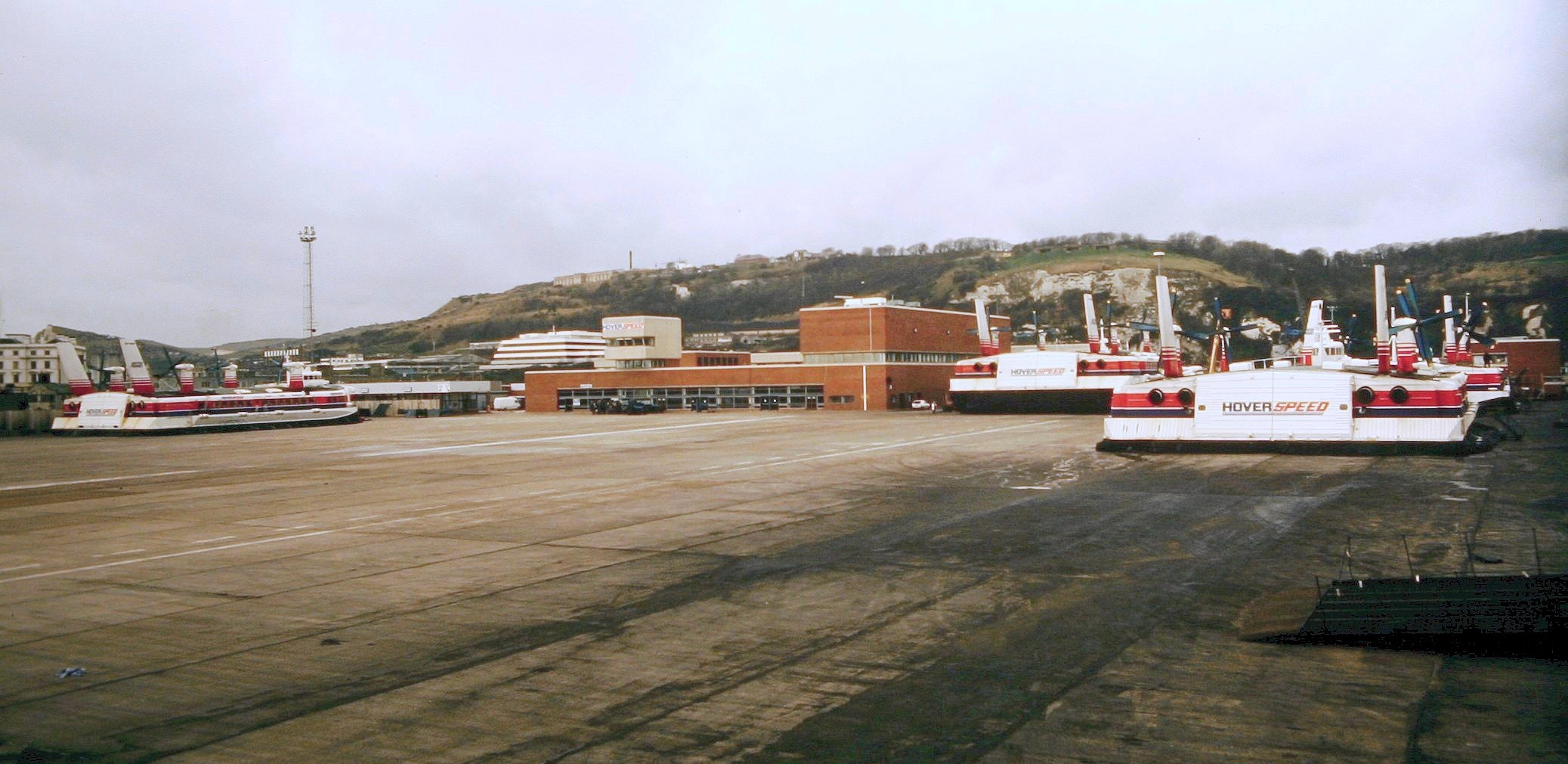
Dover hoverport

Ripe for sale, in February 1986, Hoverspeed was sold by the management consortium to British Ferries (Sealink UK's holding company) owned by Sea Containers, a transport group engaged in marine container leasing, manufacturing, depot and logistics operations, railways operator, ferry operator and leisure industry investor for a sum of £5 million, each syndicate making a profit of £600,000. Large financial gains made by former managers of British Rail was to become a feature of rail privatisation.

In 1987, Hoverspeed returned a profit of £1.6 million with a turnover of £42.3 million per year and £4.7 million in 1988 and a turnover of £44 million per year.

Being part of a larger shipping company allowed fresh re-capitalization, cheaper fuel as well as access to legal services. With the reduced fleet of hovercraft aging, it also permitted capital investment into more fuel efficient vessels with the first SeaCat catamaran services introduced in 1991 and larger Super SeaCats in 1997, the latter to achieve economies of scale in the face of stiff competition from the Channel Tunnel and the ferry companies.

=== Final Years ===
After ten months of operation, it was reported that the Ramsgate-based high speed operations of Holyman Sally Ferries would cease due to the route not being financially viable. Majority shareholder Holyman announced that they would close the route and instead form a joint venture with Hoverspeed, moving their two vessels; Diamant and Rapide to operate from Dover to Ostend from March 1998 as Holyman Hoverspeed. Holyman sold its 50% stake in Holyman Hoverspeed to Sea Containers in August 1999, bringing the route and vessels under full Hoverspeed control.

=== Closure ===
After sustaining losses annually since 1995 (the last financial year the company returned a pre-tax profit) it was clear, by the early 2000s, Hoverspeed could no longer continue operating business-as-usual.

- Competition from the Channel Tunnel

Despite the introduction of the Super SeaCats, Hoverspeed could not match EuroTunnel both in terms of economies of scale and pricing. This became apparent in the company's pre-tax profits immediately following the opening of the Channel Tunnel in May 1994.

- End of duty-free sales

Lucrative duty-free sales came to an end in July 1999 when the European Union removed tariffs between members states.

Consequently, Sea Containers announced it refused to support Hoverspeed’s losses on the English Channel and that they would cease operations on the Dover-Calais route, ending over 40 years of service.

=== Company wind-down and sale of assets ===
It was initially thought that both the 81m Seacats would move to Sea Containers Mediterranean services. However in March 2006 both the Seacat Rapide and Seacat Diamant were put up for sale by Sea Containers. Superseacat One which had operated for Hoverspeed on its now-closed Newhaven – Dieppe (2000 and 2002–2004) and Dover – Calais / Ostend (2001) fast ferry services was sold in April 2006 to Acciona Trasmediterránea and was renamed Almudaina Dos.

Although the company ended Hovercraft service, they still retained ownership of the remaining 2 SR.N4s until 2006 when they were sold to Wensley Haydon-Baillie. In 2016, following a transfer of ownership of both land and the craft to the Homes and Communities Agency, a public campaign was launched to save one or both of the craft.

By summer 2016, it was established that The Princess Anne would be saved and refurbished as a permanent exhibit at the Hovercraft Museum. The fate of The Princess Margaret, which was not in such sound structural repair, was announced on 30 May 2018 - usable parts will be moved to The Princess Anne and the craft will be scrapped.

The closure of Hoverspeed left a single company in the United Kingdom still operating hovercraft flights, Hovertravel.

== Fleet ==
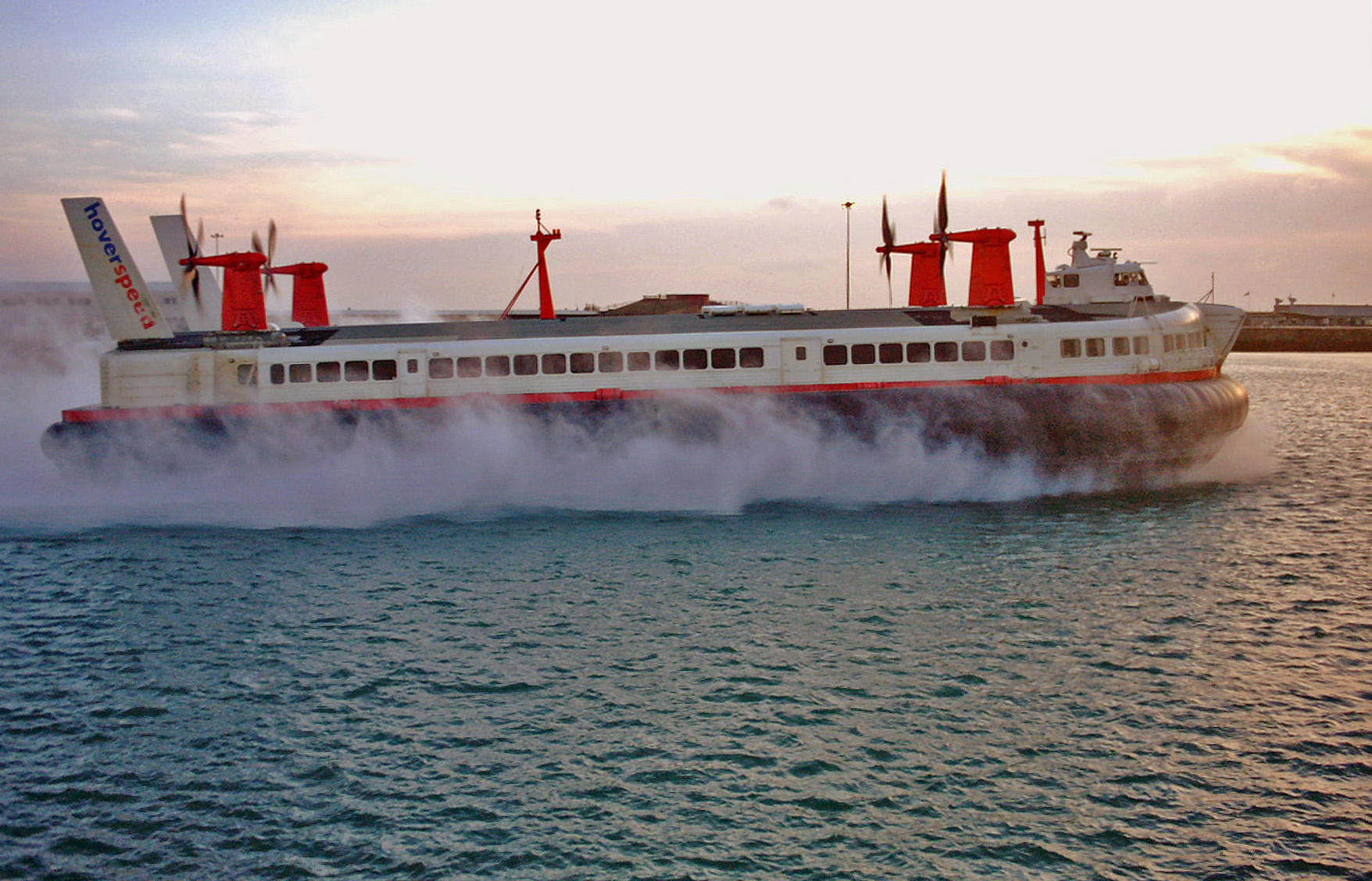
Mark III SR.N4 hovercraft arriving in Dover on its last commercial service, 1 October 2000

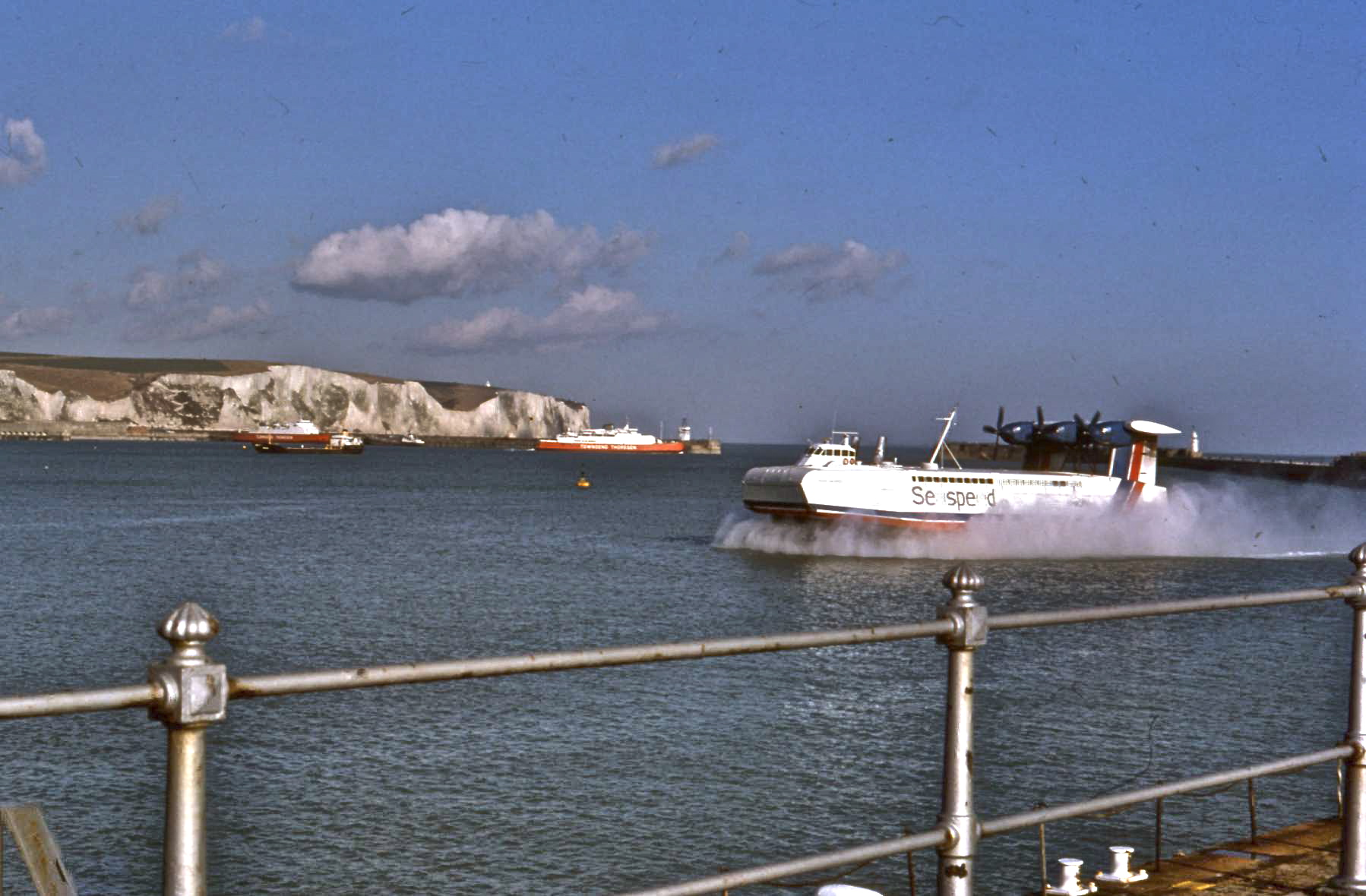
Ingénieur Jean Bertin arriving at Dover in 1980

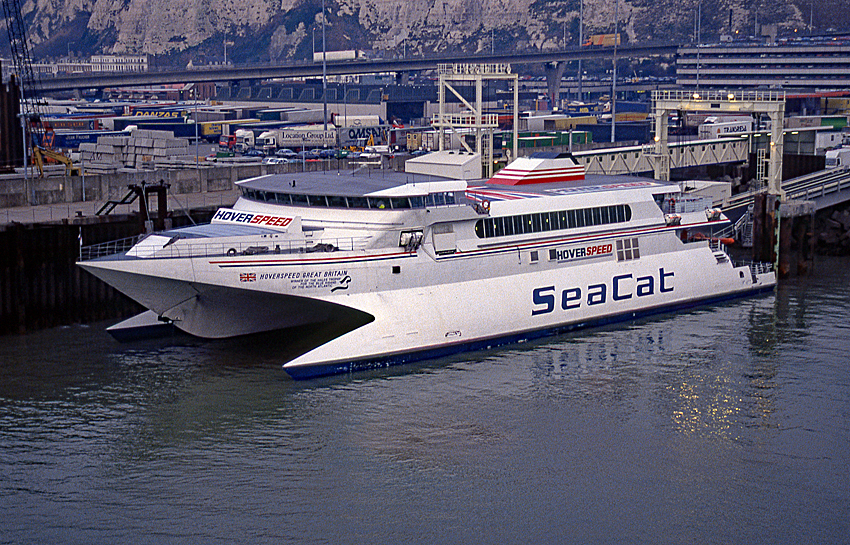
Hoverspeed Great Britain in Dover in 1992

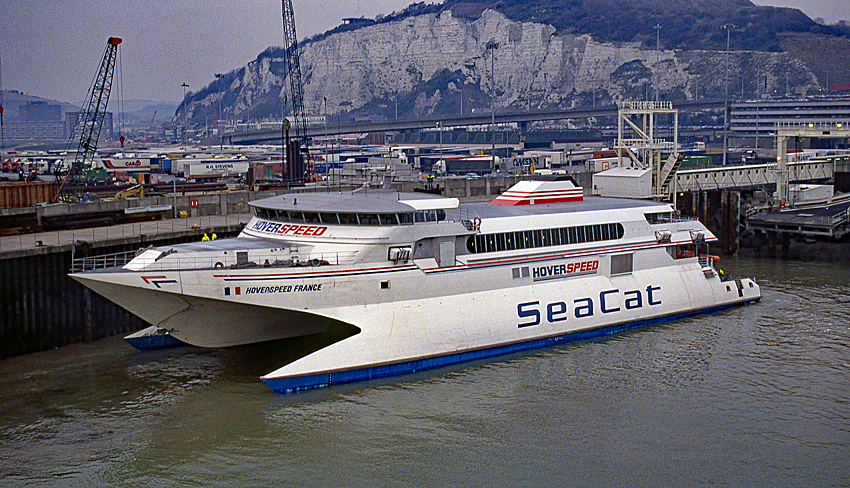
Hoverspeed France in Dover in 1992

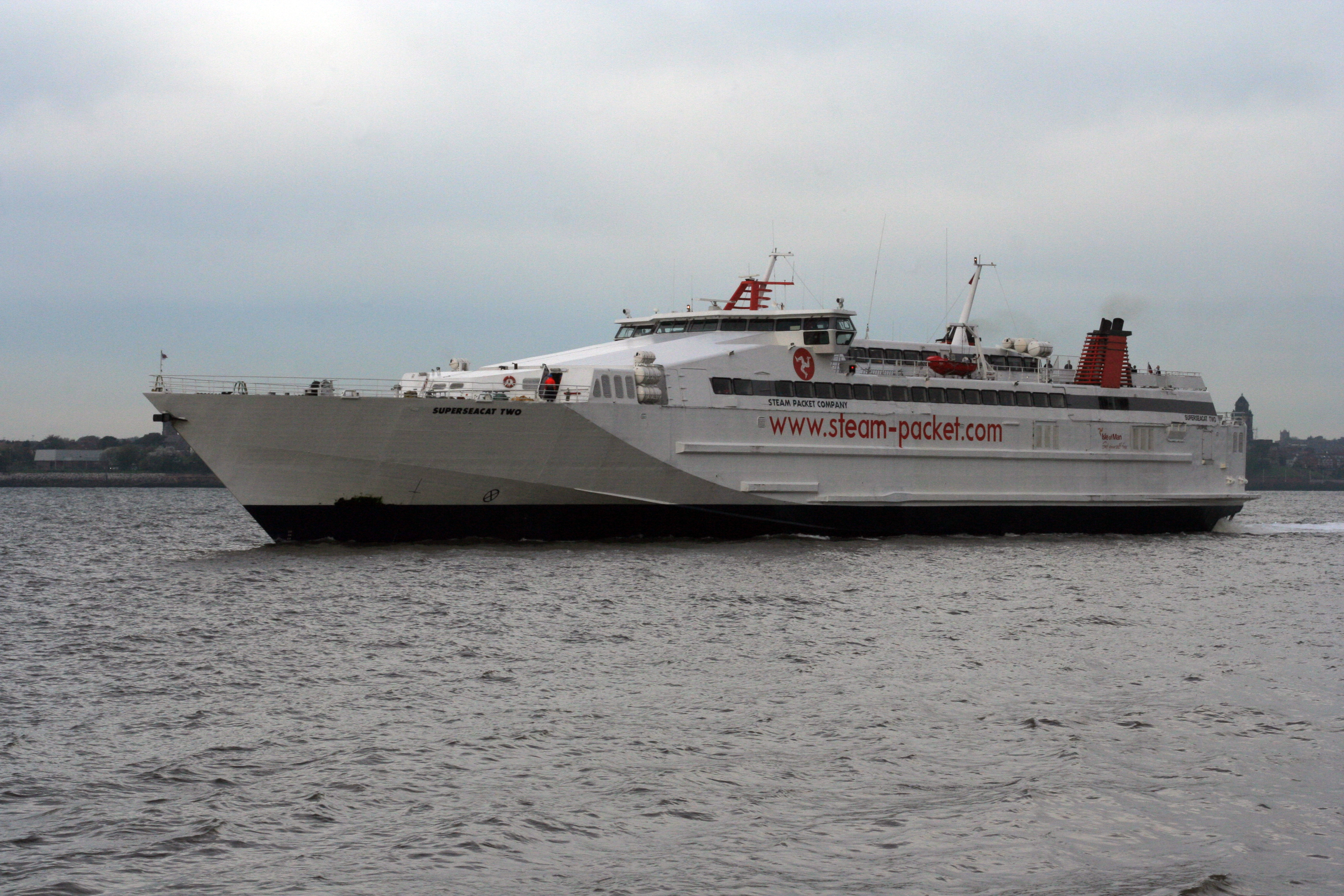
Superseacat Two in Liverpool

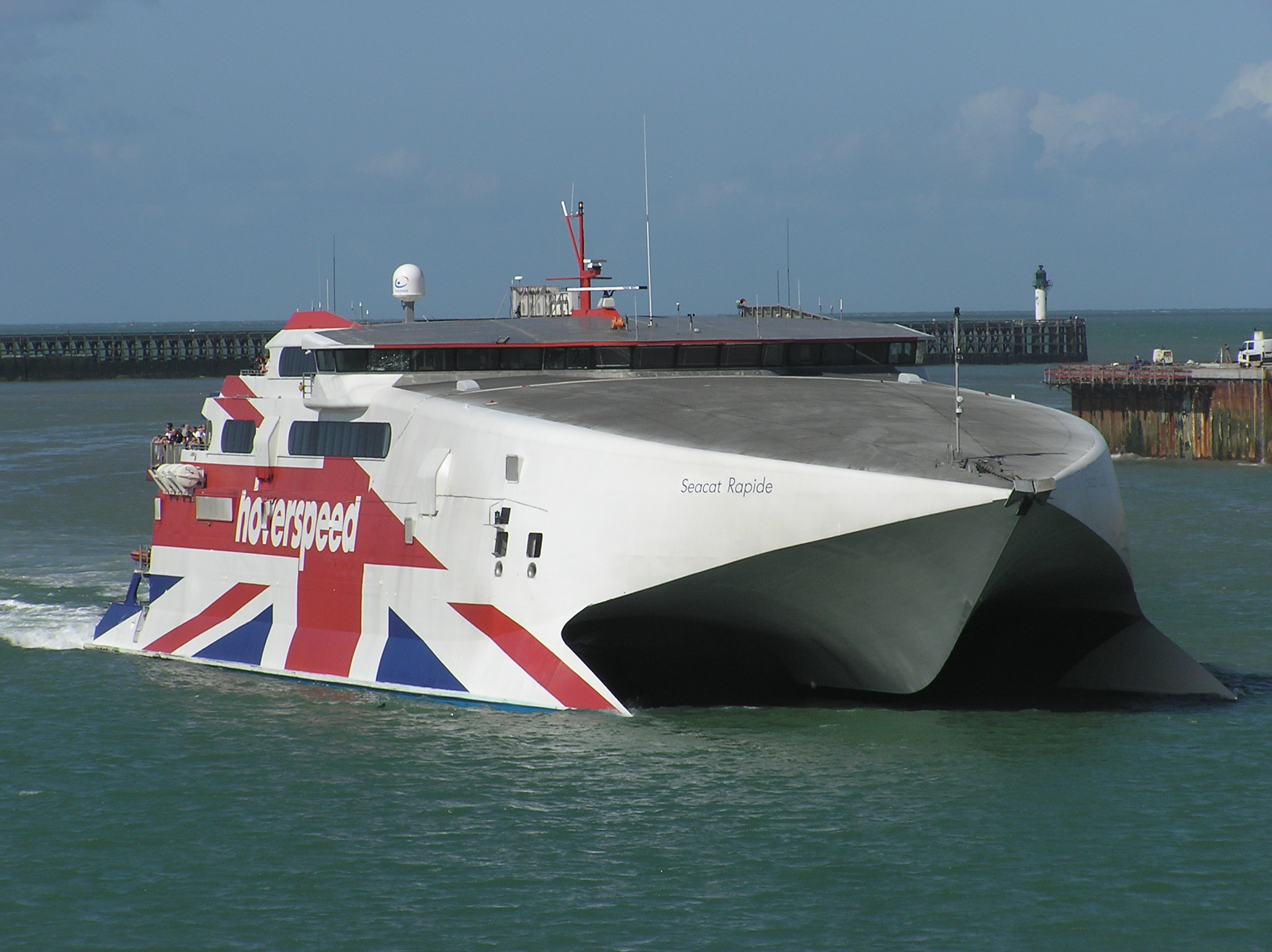
Rapide approaching Calais

Ship	Built	Builder	In service	Tonnage	History
The Princess Margaret	1968	British Hovercraft Corporation, East Cowes, Isle of Wight	1981-2000	320	Scrapped at Lee-on-the-Solent in March 2018
The Princess Anne	1968	British Hovercraft Corporation, East Cowes, Isle of Wight	1981-2000	320	On display at The Hovercraft Museum
Swift	1969	British Hovercraft Corporation, East Cowes, Isle of Wight	1981-1991	180	Scrapped at Lee-on-the-Solent in September 2004
Sure	1969	British Hovercraft Corporation, East Cowes, Isle of Wight	1981-1983	180	Scrapped at Ramsgate Hoverport in 1983
Sir Christopher	1972	British Hovercraft Corporation, East Cowes, Isle of Wight	1981-1991	180	Scrapped at Dover Hoverport in 1991
The Prince Of Wales	1977	British Hovercraft Corporation, East Cowes, Isle of Wight	1981-1991	200	Destroyed by fire at Dover Hoverport in 1993
Ingénieur Jean Bertin	1977	Société d'Étude et de Développement des Aéroglisseurs Marins, Pauillac, France	1983	260	Scrapped at Boulogne (Le Portel) Hoverport in 1985
Hoverspeed Great Britain	1990	Incat, Tasmania, Australia	1990-2004	3,003 GT	Holder of Hales Trophy 1990–1998. In service (2026) as High Speed Jet with Seajets
Hoverspeed France; SeaCat Boulogne; SeaCat Isle of Man; SeaCat Norge	1991	Incat, Tasmania, Australia	1991-1992; 1993-1994; 1996, 1997-1998	3,003 GT	In service (2026) as Caldera Vista with Seajets
Hoverspeed Belgium; Hoverspeed Boulogne; Seacat Danmark	1991	Incat, Tasmania, Australia	1991-1993; 1994; 1997; 2000-2003	3,003 GT	In service (2026) as Atlantic Express with Colonia Express
Seacat Tasmania; SeaCat Calais	1990	Incat, Tasmania, Australia	1992; 1993, 1999	3,012 GT	In service (2026) as Cat with Seajets
Seacat Scotland	1992	Incat, Tasmania, Australia	1992	3,003 GT	In service (2026) as Naxos Jet with Seajets
Superseacat One	1997	Fincantieri, Muggiano, Italy	2000-2004	4,662 GT	In service (2026) as Speedrunner Jet 2 with Seajets
Superseacat Two	1997	Fincantieri, Muggiano, Italy	1997-1998, 1999-2000, 2003	4,500 GT	In service (2026) as Hellenic Highspeed with Africa Morocco Link
Diamant	1996	Incat, Tasmania, Australia	1998-2005	4,305 GT	In service (2026) as Jaume III with Baleària
Rapide	1996	Incat, Tasmania, Australia	1998-2001, 2005	4,112 GT	In service (2026) as Jaume II with Baleària Caribbean
Superseacat Three	1999	Fincantieri, Muggiano, Italy	2001	4,465 GT	In service (2026) as Speedrunner Jet with Seajets

== Routes ==
=== Hovercraft ===
- (United Kingdom) Dover Hoverport - (France) Calais Hoverport 1981 to 2000
- (United Kingdom) Dover Hoverport - (France) Boulogne (Le Portel) Hoverport 1981 to 1993
- (United Kingdom) Ramsgate (Pegwell Bay) Hoverport - (France) Calais Hoverport 1982

=== High Speed Craft ===
- (United Kingdom) Portsmouth - (France) Cherbourg 1990 to 1991
- (United Kingdom) Dover - (France) Calais 1991 to 2005
- (United Kingdom) Dover - (France) Boulogne 1991 to 1993
- (United Kingdom) Folkestone - (France) Boulogne 1993 to 2000
- (United Kingdom) Dover - (Belgium) Ostend 1998 to 2003
- (United Kingdom) Newhaven - (France) Dieppe 1999 to 2004

== Former Hoverspeed routes today ==
Since the closure of Hoverspeed, there have been no other high speed ferry services between Dover and Calais, and Dover and Ostende.

SpeedFerries launched a high speed Dover-Boulogne service in 2004, and this continued after the closure of Hoverspeed in 2005. In February 2007, SpeedFerries signed a lease on the former Dover Hoverport, though not the terminal building, moving there from the Eastern Docks. SpeedFerries went into administration in November 2008, which saw the cessation of services to Boulogne. The hoverport site was redeveloped in 2009.

After withdrawal by Hoverspeed from Folkestone in September 2000, the only remaining ferry service using Folkestone Harbour was operated by Falcon Seafreight, but this too closed in June 2001 and the port at Folkestone closed to all ferry traffic.

The route between Newhaven and Dieppe, continues to be served by a conventional ferry service by Transmanche Ferries, who commenced operations in 2001, after the failure of Hoverspeed to reach an agreement with Transmanche to charter Superseacat One for a service proposed to recommence in April 2005.

A high speed ferry service between Portsmouth and Cherbourg was launched, after a gap of nearly seven years, in 1998 by P&O Portsmouth using the chartered high speed ferry Superstar Express. This was replaced by the Portsmouth Express service in 2000 which operated until P&O Ferries withdrew from the Western Channel in 2005. Brittany Ferries launched a replacement high speed service in March 2005 using Normandie Express, which operated on the route until 2019 when it ceased.

Ramsgate Hoverport saw no further passenger services, but remained as an operational and maintenance base, with administration taking place on site until October 1985, and engineering (particularly hovercraft overhauls) continuing until December 1987. The buildings were demolished in August 1995.
