= Nordström & Thulin =

Swedish shipping company

Nordström & Thulin was a Swedish ship company. Company's headquarters were located in Stockholm at an address Skeppsbron 34.

The company was founded in 1850 by Carl David Nordström (1816–1881).

In 2000s the company was liquidated.
