= SeaCat =

Former Scottish ferry service

Sea Containers Ferries Scotland
- Type: Limited company
- Industry: Passenger transportation
- Founded: 1991
- Defunct: 2004
- Fate: Dissolved
- Headquarters: Belfast, Northern Ireland
- Area served: Northern Ireland, Scotland, England
- Owner: Sea Containers

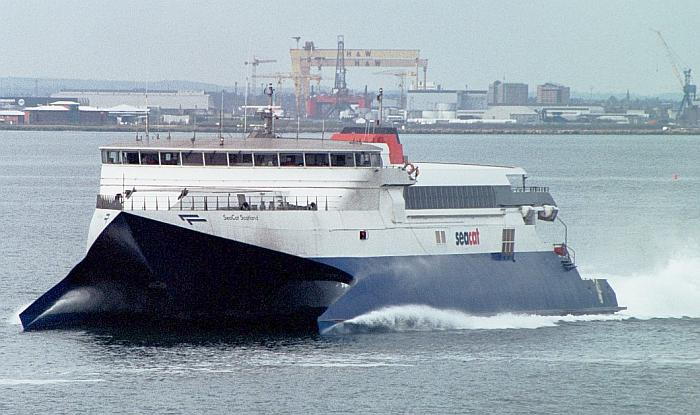
SeaCat Scotland in Belfast; the iconic cranes Samson and Goliath of Harland & Wolff in the background.

SeaCat was the marketing name used by Sea Containers Ferries Scotland for its services between Northern Ireland, Scotland and England between 1992 and 2004. The company was originally based in Stranraer later moving to Belfast. The name originates from the use of high-speed catamaran ferries.

== History ==
SeaCat announced that they would open a service from Belfast to Stranraer in Scotland. The route would take just 90 minutes, berth to berth. On 1 June 1992 the service opened using SeaCat Scotland, a fast-74 metre Incat craft built in the same year.

Services to Stranraer ran smoothly until Stena Line announced in November 1995 they would move to Belfast from Larne and operate to Stranraer. In 1999 SeaCat was feeling the pinch of the growing success of the Stena HSS and on 29 April that year began a daily service to Troon alongside the Stranraer service. Dumfries and Galloway council requested that SeaCat drop the Troon link in favour of Stranraer, or else SeaCat would have to vacate Stranraer by 2000. SeaCat ceased operations to Stranraer on 13 March 2000; however, there was an agreement in place that SeaCat could use the port in the "event of an operational need".

In 2003, P&O Irish Sea began to serve Troon on a seasonal basis, in direct competition to SeaCat. SeaCat incurred losses, despite the service being far more popular than that run by P&O and being a year-round service. By December 2003 the SeaCat service switched to being a seasonal service. The 2004 season started on 12 March and ended on Monday 1 November 2004.

In January 2005 SeaCat announced they were to "review the service" and a "definitive" decision would be made within 30 days. On 7 February 2005, SeaCat closed their 12-year-old service.

== Changes in the ferry industry ==
When SeaCat were reviewing their service they expressed views on how the shipping industry underwent immense change.

When the company was formed back in 1992 they were the first car-carrying high speed catamarans on the Irish Sea. However, in 1996 HSS was introduced by Stena Line which made a mark on SeaCat. This mark caused the closure of their Stranraer services.

In 2000, when SeaCat switched services to Troon, they had success which was in the forms of full vessels per sailing. This was short-lived when in 2003 P&O Ferries Irish Sea also began operating a Larne-Troon service, which beat SeaCat's time by 40 minutes. In 2004 the losses were 'immense' and the route had to be discontinued.

SeaCat were the pioneers of fast ferry travel in 1992–1996.

P&O Ferries subsequently reviewed and ceased their Larne to Troon service in 2015, citing poor passenger volumes.

== Terminals ==
=== Belfast ===
The Belfast terminal at Donegall Quay was constructed in the 1960s for a service between Belfast and Ardrossan. This service was terminated and the terminal lay disused for some time. It was then used by P&O Ferries between Donegall Quay in Belfast and Princes Dock in Liverpool. This service was closed in November 1981. Belfast Car Ferries later operated the service to Liverpool (Brocklebank Dock) which closed in October 1990. It originally had two passenger walkways; however, one was removed in 1996. The Isle of Man Steam Packet Company used the terminal up to 2008, when they moved to a new terminal at Albert Quay. The Donegall Quay terminal lay disused once again for 3 years, and was eventually demolished in 2011. The remains of the terminal area are now used by local car enthusiasts to hold car meets and cruises, which are called SeaCat Cruise which is a direct reference to the purpose the terminal formerly served. As of 2019, the former terminal area is now home to the AC Hotel by Marriott, which is a 4 star hotel.

=== Stranraer ===
The Stranraer terminal was constructed in 1991 and had one passenger walkway. The terminal was used up until April 2000 when services moved to Troon. The terminal building was demolished soon after vacation of the harbour, the walkway remaining until 2005. The harbour area which SeaCat once occupied at Stranraer has since been developed into a marina as part of the waterfront redevelopment being carried out by Dumfries and Galloway Council. As of November 2008, the marina has been opened and currently is home to many small pleasure craft.

=== Troon ===
The terminal building was a portable building and was used up until 2004. There were two portable buildings, one of which, the 'foot passenger lounge' was cleared as soon as the service was terminated. The check-in building persisted until April 2008 when it was cleared as well. The facilities are being redeveloped into a berth for cargo ships.

== Fleet ==
The fleet consisted of first generation high speed catamarans. They were 74 metre Incat ships built in Hobart, Tasmania in the early 1990s.

=== SeaCat Scotland ===
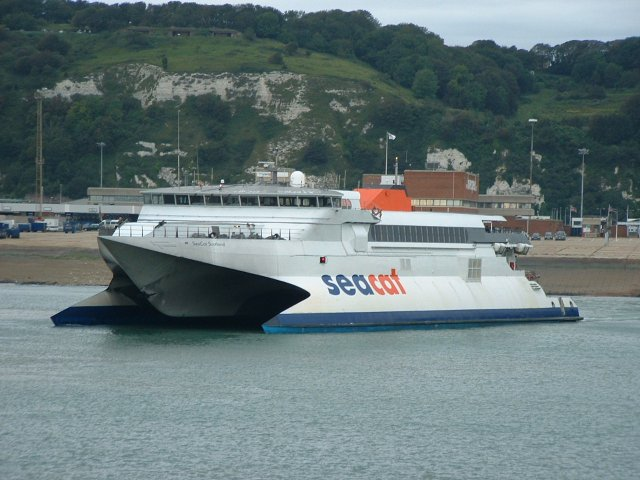
SeaCat Scotland in Dover in 2004

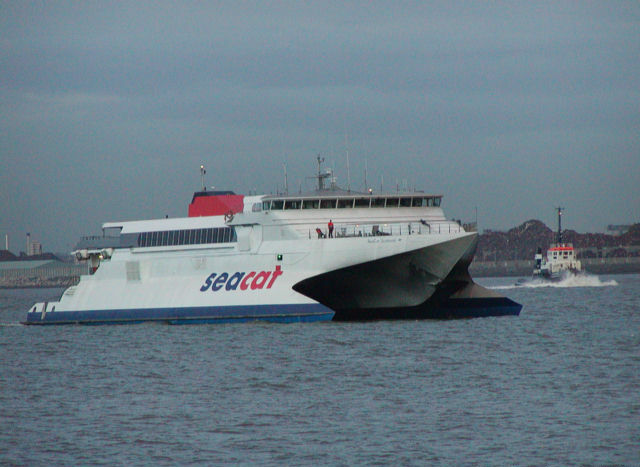

SeaCat Scotland was the sole ferry the company used between 1992 and 2002. She was chartered in 1995 and renamed Q-Ship Express for a month, reverting to SeaCat Scotland at the conclusion of her charter in December 1995. On 31 October 2002 SeaCat Scotland left Troon for the final time and was laid-up at Belfast and overhauled. She arrived at Liverpool on 28 November 2002. For 2003-2004 she operated for Hoverspeed between Dover and Calais. From September 2004 until March 2007 she was laid up in Sunderland. She is now in service with many of her former SeaCat/Hoverspeed fleet mates in Greece as the "Naxos Jet".

=== SeaCat Rapide ===
SeaCat Rapide was used by SeaCat in 2001 for Isle of Man services, and also between Liverpool and Dublin. (The Liverpool-Dublin route was also closed in November 2004). In 2002 SeaCat used her on the Belfast to Heysham service, which stopped on Wednesday 21 August 2002 when the Rapide had an engine fire on the 07:00 service to Heysham. In 2003 and 2004 she was used on the Belfast to Troon route (Seacat Scotland operated Dover-Calais). Rapide was the final craft Seacat used on their Troon route. Rapide left Troon for the final time with the 19:30 service from Troon on Monday 1 November 2004. She left Belfast for the final time at 16:20 on 8 November 2004 bound for Sunderland to be laid up with Seacat Scotland, Emeraude France and Diamant.

She now operates for Baleria Caribbean as Jaume II.

=== Other vessels ===
- SeaCat Danmark (1997–1999): now operates between Buenos Aires and Montevideo as Atlantic Express.
- SeaCat Isle of Man (2002–2003): operates for Seajets as Caldera Vista.
- Hoverspeed Great Britain (2001): has been laid-up for sometime in Greece. Owned by SeaJets and is used for spare parts for other Incat 74m class ships.
- SuperSeaCat Two (2000): operates for Hellenic Seaways as Hellenic Highspeed.
