= Caldera Vista =

Ship built in 1990

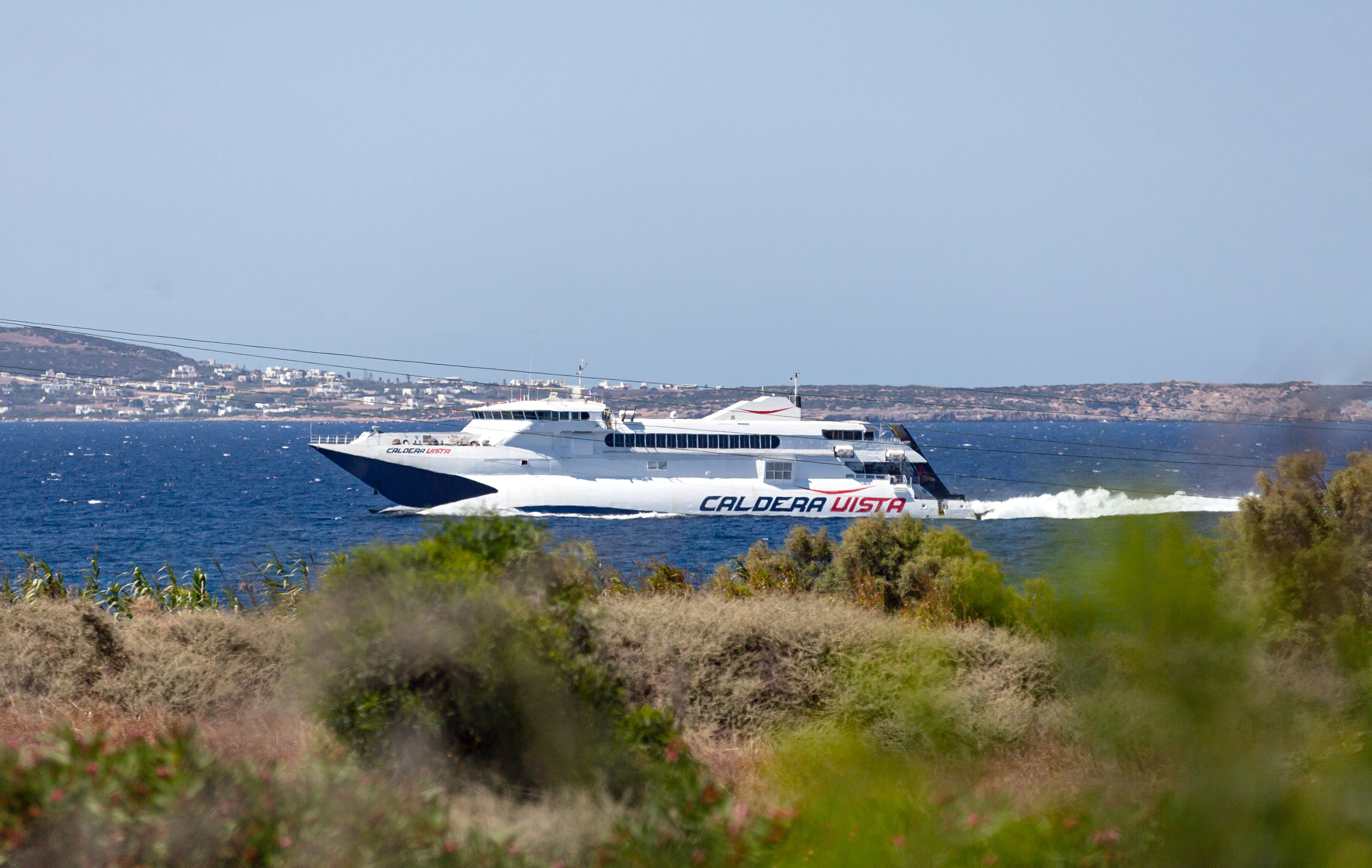
- Caldera Vista passing Naxos in August 2020

History
- Name: Hoverspeed France (1991–1992); Sardegna Express (1992–1993); Seacat Boulogne (1993–1994); SeaCat Isle of Man (1994–1996); SeaCat Norge (1996–1997); SeaCat Isle of Man (1997–2005); Sea Express 1 (2005–2008); Snaefell (2008–2011); Master Jet (2011–2018); Caldera Vista (2018–)
- Owner: Hoverspeed (1991–1997); Isle of Man Steam Packet Company (1997–2012); Seajets (2012–present)
- Operator: Hoverspeed (1991–1992); Sardegna Express (1992–1993); Hoverspeed (1993–1994); Isle of Man Steam Packet Company (1994–1996); Color Line (1996–1997); IoMSPC (1997–2005); Irish Sea Express (2006–2007); IoMSPC (2006–2011); Seajets (2011–present)
- Port of registry: (The Bahamas) Nassau (1991–96); (United Kingdom) Newhaven (1996–2008); (United Kingdom) Liverpool (2008–2011); (Cyprus) Limassol (2011–)
- Builder: Incat, Australia
- Yard number: 026
- Launched: 28 April 1990
- Identification: IMO number: 8900012
- Status: In Service

General characteristics
- Tonnage: 3,003 GT
- Length: 74 m (242 ft 9 in)
- Beam: 26 m (85 ft 4 in)
- Draught: 2.4 m (7 ft 10 in)
- Installed power: 4 × Ruston 16RK 270 diesel engines
- Propulsion: 4 x Lips waterjets
- Speed: 32 knots (37 mph)
- Capacity: 450 passengers; 70 cars

Caldera Vista is a high speed catamaran owned by Seajets. Built in 1990 by Incat for Hoverspeed as the Hoverspeed France, it has operated under a number of names.

== History ==
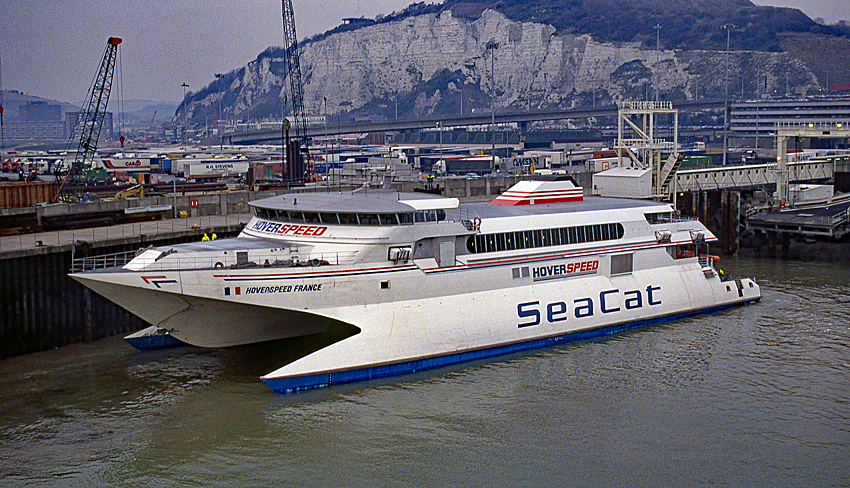
Hoverspeed France at Dover in 1992

Caldera Vista was built by Incat, Australia as the Hoverspeed France for Hoverspeed, in 1991; and operated as the Sardegna Express on charter, before returning to Hoverspeed as the SeaCat Boulogne. In 1994, she was again renamed to SeaCat Isle of Man, and chartered to the Isle of Man Steam Packet Company (IoMSPC). She brought with her high charter fees and operation costs; and endangered the career of the Lady of Mann, the latter being given a much needed lifeline when a freak wave in the River Mersey encountered by the SeaCat Isle of Man twisted the ship's bow and tore off the water-tight visor. The IoMSPC decided not to continue in chartering the ship from Sea Containers, and she was chartered out to ColorSeaCat as the SeaCat Norge.

She returned to Hoverspeed as the SeaCat Norge; and when her owners bought out the IoMSPC in 1996, she returned to the Irish Sea as the SeaCat Isle of Man once again. Briefly going back to Hoverspeed from 1997 until 1998; she returned to the Isle of Man service from 1998 until 2005.

=== 2007 accident ===
SeaCat Isle of Man became Sea Express 1, and operated for Irish Sea Express in 2005. The next year, she returned to the IoMSPC fleet. In February 2007, the vessel was involved in a collision with a cargo vessel in fog on the River Mersey. Nobody was injured, but the ship was seriously damaged, and took on a large volume of water. By the next day, the ship was stable. The first attempt to tow the ship across the river to drydock failed, but the second succeeded. In December 2007, whilst still under repair, the vessel was renamed Snaefell.

=== Return to service ===
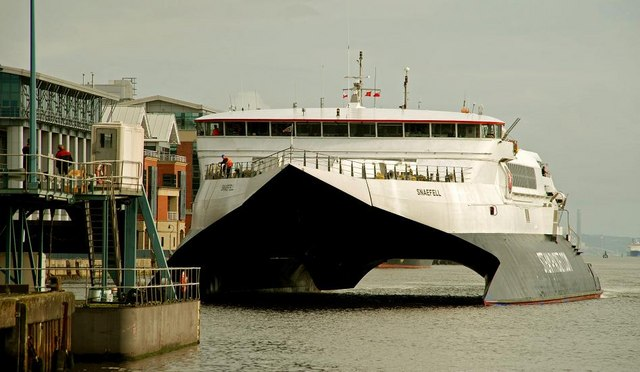
Snaefell in Belfast

Snaefell moved under her own power for the first time in over a year when she moved from the West Float in Birkenhead to the Pier Head Landing Stage, and then after a detour, headed out on trials which were expected to take three days, and took two. Snaefell's first passenger sailing since her accident in 2007 was on 12 May 2008, with the 07:30 sailing to Liverpool. During her time as Snaefell she was conferred the status of Royal Mail Ship.

In May 2009, it was reported in the press that the company is continuing to review the future of the veteran fastcraft in the light of the increased capacity offered by Manannan and poor passenger numbers on the seasonal Belfast and Dublin routes.

On 9 July 2009, an article was published on the Isle of Man Today website stating that Manx ministers were pleading with the IoMSPC after they confirmed they were reviewing the future of Snaefell and the services to Belfast and Dublin. This has to be balanced against the fact that the IoMSPC previously requested, and was granted, an extension to its user agreement with the Government of the Isle of Man. This required it to operate over 60 sailings each year to Ireland until 2026. Any decision to cease operations to Ireland would therefore either nullify the agreement or require significant non-performance payments from the Steam Packet.

=== Engine problems ===
In July 2010, Snaefell suffered a crank-shaft failure, causing one of her engines to fail. This caused major disruption, as she could not carry out her Liverpool, Belfast and Dublin sailings efficiently as they would take 4 to 5 hours. She continued to operate on three engines until September 2010, when the timetable allowed Manannan to cover her sailings.

=== Sale to Seajets ===
In January 2011, the IoMSPC released a statement stating that Snaefell was no longer part of the operational fleet and would not return to service for the 2011 season. She was reported as being on sale in February 2011. The vessel was reflagged from the United Kingdom to Cyprus. In late April, the vessel was chartered to Seajets and renamed Master Jet. She was then sold to the company in 2012. The vessel operated on the Piraeus-Paros-Naxos-Koufonisia-Amorgos route as of 2015. In 2018 she was renamed Caldera Vista.

== Routes ==
In 2024, the vessel was chartered to African Marocco Link (AML), to operate between Algeciras and Tanger Med.

== Accidents and Incidents ==
On 27 June 2013, the 74-meter high-speed catamaran ferry Master Jet allided with the pier at the port of Rethymno, Crete, Greece. The incident occurred while the vessel was executing a docking maneuver with 670 passengers on board.

The impact caused damage to one of the vessel's propulsion systems, specifically damaging its propeller. No injuries were reported among the passengers or crew, and there was no release of marine environmental pollution. Following an assessment by port authorities, the Master Jet was officially detained at Rethymno to undergo technical inspections and repairs before being cleared to resume its scheduled service.
