= Reijo =

Reijo is a Finnish male given name. There are more than 27,000 people with this name in Finland. More than half of them were born in the 1940s and 1950s. It originated as a variation of the Latin name Gregorius and the Greek name Gregorios, which are the equivalent of Gregory in English. The nameday is the 12th of March, the anniversary of the death of Pope Gregory I.

Notable people who have this name include:

- Reijo Hakanen, Finnish ice hockey player
- Reijo Halme, Finnish sprinter
- Reijo Hammar, Finnish murderer
- Reijo Leppänen, Finnish ice hockey player
- Reijo Linna, Finnish former footballer
- Reijo Mäki, Finnish writer
- Reijo Mattinen, Finnish orienteering competitor
- Reijo Mikkolainen, Finnish ice hockey player
- Reijo Ruotsalainen, Finnish ice hockey player
- Reijo Ståhlberg, Finnish shot putter
- Reijo Tossavainen, Finnish politician
- Reijo Vähälä, Finnish high jumper
