= MS Vana Tallinn =

1973 ferry

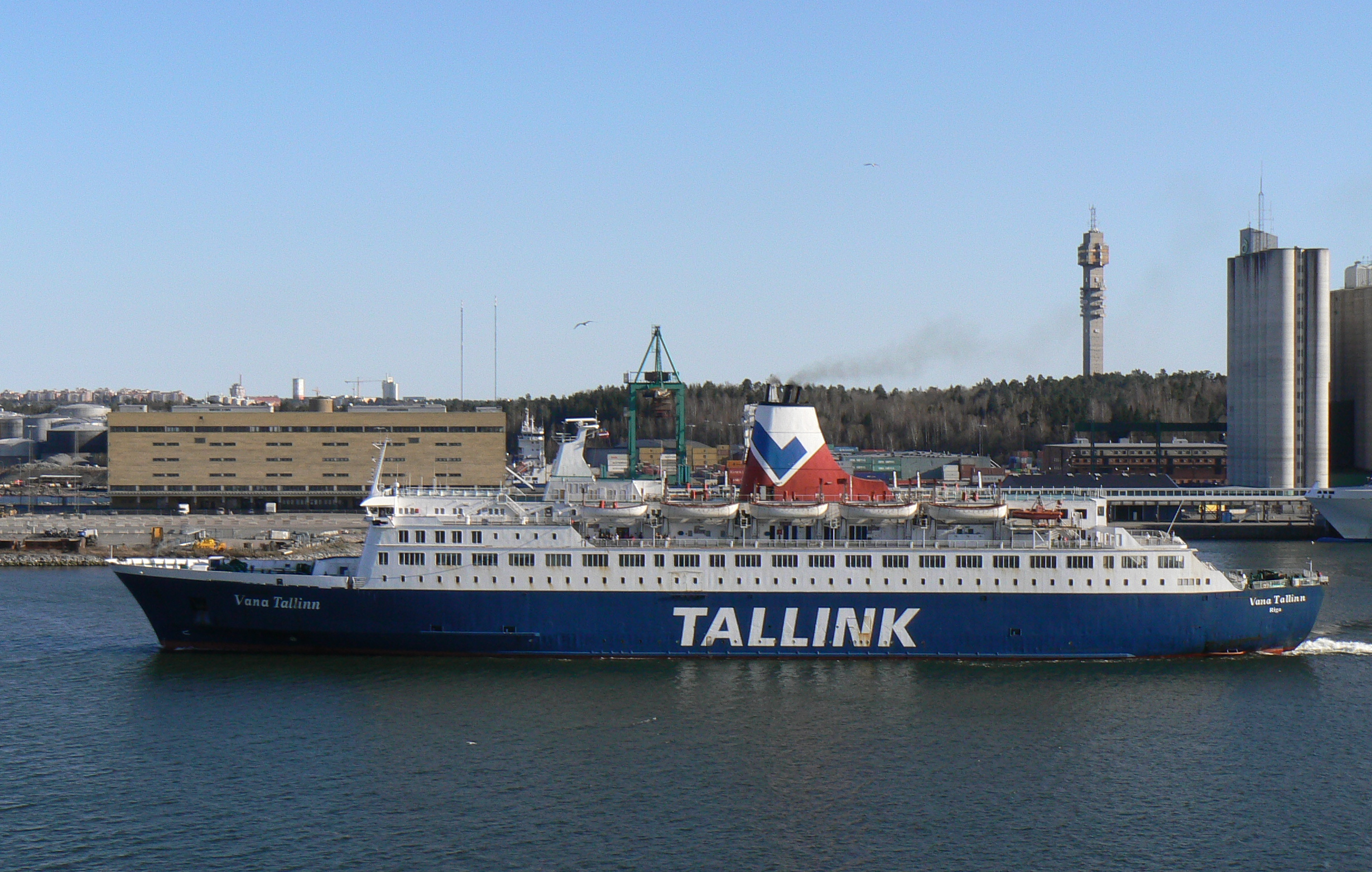
- Vana Tallinn departing Stockholm, April 2008

History
- Name: 1974–1990: Dana Regina; 1990–1993: Nord Estonia; 1993: Thor Heyerdahl; 1994–2011: Vana Tallinn; 2011–2014: Adriatica Queen
- Owner: 1974–1989: DFDS; 1989–1990: Marne Investments Ltd; 1990–1993: Nordström & Thulin; 1993–1997: Inreko; 1997–2011: Tallink; 2011–2014: Allferries
- Operator: 1974–1990: DFDS Seaways; 1990–1993: EstLine; 1993: Larvik Line; 1994–1996: Tallink; 1996–1997: TH Ferries; 1998–2011: Tallink; 2011–2014: Allferries
- Port of registry: 1974–1990: Copenhagen, Denmark; 1990–1993: Stockholm, Sweden; 1993: Gothenburg, Sweden; 1993–2007: Tallinn, Estonia; 2007–2011: Riga, Latvia; 2011–2014: Panama, Panama; 2014:Togo
- Route: None
- Ordered: 24 December 1969
- Builder: Aalborg Skibsværft A/S, Ålborg, Denmark
- Yard number: 200
- Laid down: 7 May 1973
- Launched: 31 August 1973
- Christened: 1 July 1974
- Acquired: 28 June 1974
- In service: 1 July 1974
- Identification: IMO number: 7329522
- Fate: Scrapped

General characteristics (as built)
- Tonnage: 10,002 GRT; 2,850 tonnes deadweight (DWT)
- Length: 153.70 m (504.3 ft)
- Beam: 22.31 m (73.2 ft)
- Draught: 6.00 m (19.69 ft)
- Installed power: 4 B&W-Helsingør DM845HU diesels; combined 12,945 kW (17,360 hp)
- Speed: 18 kn (33 km/h; 21 mph)
- Capacity: 1,064 passengers; 861 passenger berths; 300 cars; 600 lanemeters

General characteristics (currently)
- Installed power: 2 × Zgoda Sulzer 6ZAL 40 S diesels; 2 × Zgoda Sulzer 8ZL 40/48 diesels
- Speed: 18 kn (33 km/h; 21 mph)
- Capacity: 1,500 passengers; 858 passenger berths; 370 cars; 600 lanemeters

MS Vana Tallinn (Old Tallinn in Estonian) was a cruiseferry owned by the Estonian ferry company Tallink and operated on the line between Kapellskär and Paldiski. She was built in 1974 by Aalborg Skibsværft AS, Aalborg, Denmark for DFDS as MS Dana Regina, and has sailed under the names MS Nord Estonia and MS Thor Heyerdahl.

== History ==
The Dana Regina was ordered in 1969 by DFDS, the oldest operational Danish shipping company. The ship was completed in 1974 and christened MS Dana Regina. After a promotional cruise from Copenhagen to Esbjerg via Harwich and London she started scheduled service on the Harwich–Esbjerg route on 8 July 1974. In January 1977 the ship was rebuilt at Hamburg, Germany with an enlarged car capacity. In October 1983 the Dana Regina was transferred to Copenhagen–Oslo route.

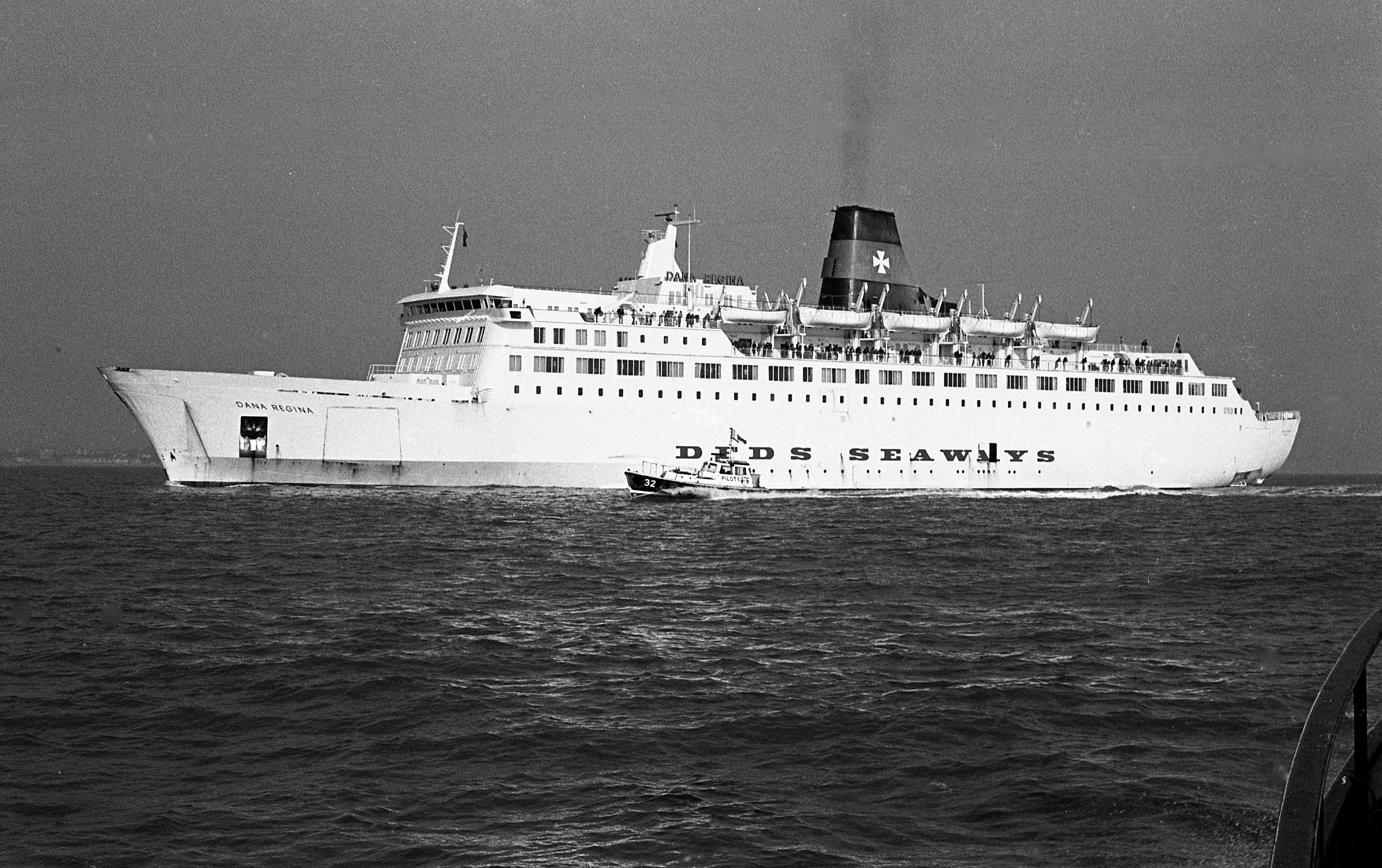
"Dana Regina" at Harwich, 1979

In June 1990, the Dana Regina was sold to Nordström & Thulin, Sweden, who renamed her MS Nord Estonia and used her to open a service between Tallinn and Stockholm under colours of their subsidiary EstLine. In 1993 the Nord Estonia was supplanted by larger tonnage (the ill-fated MS Estonia), and she was chartered to Larvik Line who renamed her MS Thor Heyerdahl and used her on the Larvik–Frederikshavn route between March and August 1993. The charter contract also included an option for Larvik Line to buy the ship, but they decided not to use it and at the end of the charter the Thor Heyerdahl was laid up in Gothenburg.

In May 1994 the ship was sold to Inreko, at the time one of the owners of Tallink, who renamed her MS Vana Tallinn and placed her on the Helsinki–Tallinn route. Already in September 1994 a rift developed between Inreko and ESCO, the two owners of Tallink. As a result, Inreko withdrew from Tallink, and chartered the Vana Tallinn to ESCO who continued to operate her on the same route under the same name (from the passenger's point of view nothing changed, which has led to some confusing records from this time of the ship's history). Continuous disputes about the charter price of the ship led to breaking the charter agreement in November 1996, and in December of the same year Inreko founded TH Ferries, which began operating the Vana Tallinn on the Helsinki–Tallinn route in competition to Tallink. However, in January 1998 the ship was sold to Hansatee (now the owners of Tallink), and returned to Tallink's colours, still sailing on the same route under the same name.

Tallink began modernising their fleet during the first years of the 21st century, and as new tonnage was delivered the Vana Tallinn was transferred to service between Paldiski (a port town near Tallinn) and Kapellskär (a port town near Stockholm). On new year 2005/2006 the ship was chartered to make a special cruise from St. Petersburg to Tallinn. A year later she made a similar but more extensive cruise with the itinerary St. Petersburg–Helsinki–Stockholm–Tallinn–St Petersburg. After this cruise, on 10 January 2007, the ship was temporarily transferred back to Helsinki–Tallinn route to cover for the MS Meloodia (which had been chartered to Balearic Islands, Spain) until the actual replacement MS Star was delivered in April 2007. After the delivery of Star the Vana Tallinn was transferred to Stockholm–Riga route, running parallel with MS Regina Baltica.

On 2 August 2008 the Vana Tallinn was replaced by MS Silja Festival on the Stockholm–Riga service. Subsequently, the Vana Tallinn was laid up in Paljassaare, Tallinn until 1 October 2008, when she was reactivated as a freighter for the Paldiski–Kapellskär service. The freighter service was short however and the ship was laid up again in Estonian Kopli in April 2009. She was subsequently leased to Allferries in June 2011 for a 3-year contract in the Mediterranean and got name Adriatica Queen.

The ship was scrapped at Aliga, Turkey in 2014.
