= 1987 Viking Sally murder =

Murder aboard a ferry in 1987

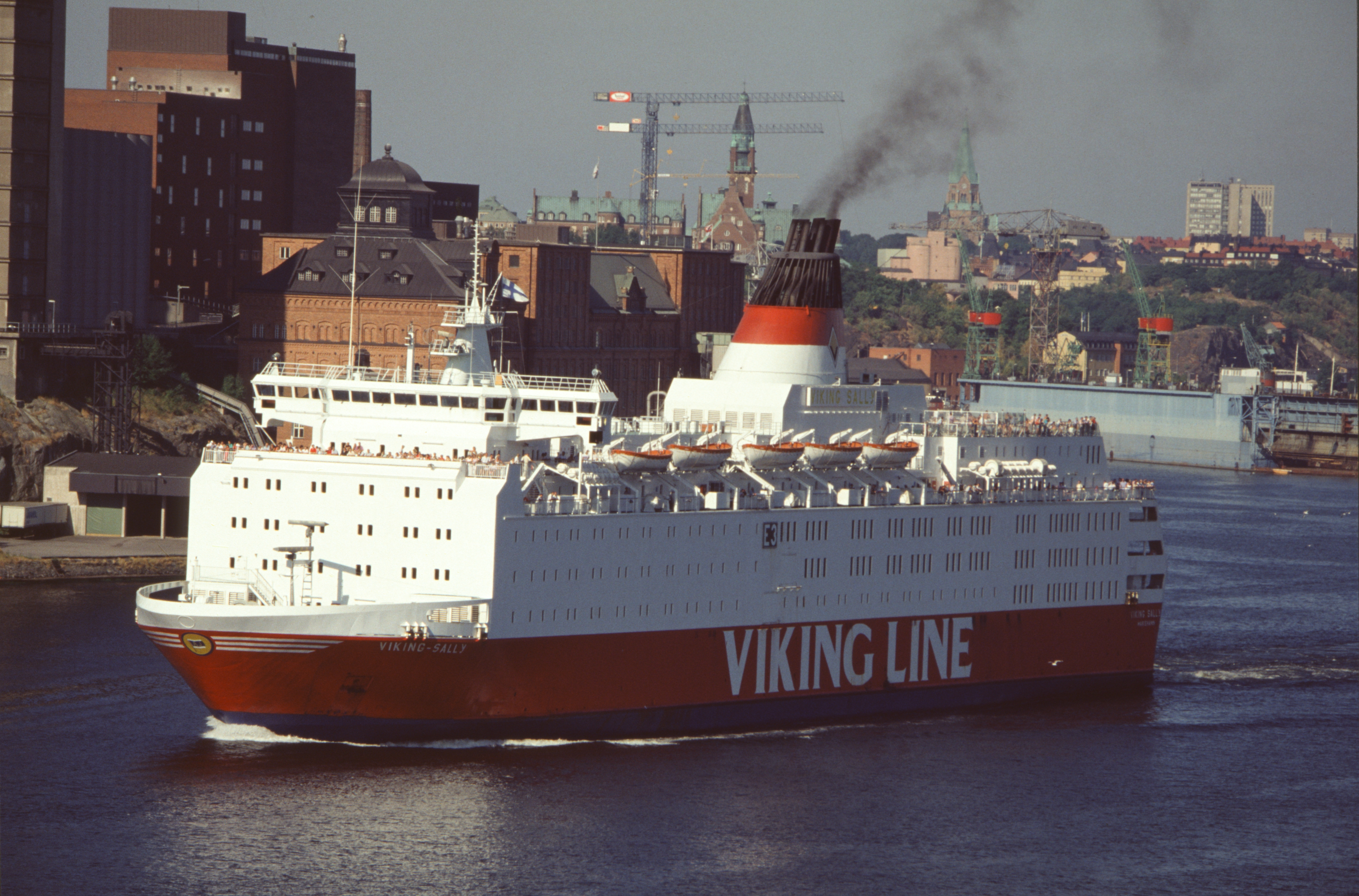
- MS Viking Sally, pictured in Stockholm harbour in the 1980s
- Date: 28 July 1987
- Time: Unknown, likely shortly before 03:45 (EEST)
- Venue: Aboard cruiseferry MS Viking Sally
- Location: Åland archipelago, Finnish territorial waters
- Deaths: 1 (Klaus Schelkle)
- Injuries: 1 (Bettina Taxis)
- Accused: 1 (Herman Himle)
- Charges: Murder and attempted murder
- Trial: May–June 2021
- Verdict: Acquitted

The 1987 Viking Sally murder was a homicide which took place on 28 July 1987 aboard the cruiseferry MS Viking Sally, en route from Stockholm, Sweden, to Turku, Finland. An assailant attacked two West German tourists, Klaus Schelkle (aged 20) and Bettina Taxis (aged 22), killing Schelkle and seriously injuring Taxis. In September 2020, Finnish police announced charges against a suspect and passed the case on to prosecutors. In June 2021, the suspect was acquitted. The crime remains unsolved.

== Background ==
Klaus Schelkle (born 1967) and Bettina Taxis (born 1965) were students from West Germany who were romantically involved. Together with Schelkle's friend, Thomas Schmid, they had decided to tour the Nordic countries on an Interrail rail pass, with the aim of travelling from West Germany to Stockholm, crossing over on a ferry to Turku, continuing up through Finland to Lapland, and returning south along the coast of Norway.

The trio sailed from Stockholm in the late evening of 27 July. They became acquainted with a number of their fellow passengers that night, including a young British man on his way to meet a Finnish woman he had met earlier, and a Finnish car parts dealer returning from a business trip in Germany. Schelkle and Taxis were social and outgoing; Schmid was more reserved. The three had limited funds, which explains why on the night of the incident they did not have cabins, instead sleeping in a public area.

Viking Sally was part of the Viking Line ferry fleet, which provides daily cruiseferry services between Sweden, Finland and Åland. It had capacity for c. 2,000 passengers and 400 vehicles, and a crew of approximately 200. The previous year, a passenger had been murdered on the same ship. In 1990, Viking Sally was sold to Silja Line and renamed Silja Star, before being sold to Wasa Line and renamed Wasa King. In 1993, she was sold to Estline and renamed Estonia, which sank in the Baltic Sea on September 28 1994, with the loss of 852 lives.

== Night of the incident ==
Around 01:00 on 28 July, Schelkle and Taxis fetched their sleeping bags from inside the ship, while Schmid was asleep in a public area with the backpacks and other belongings of all three. The couple headed for the open-air 9th deck at the rear of the ship, where they had earlier identified a sheltered spot next to the ship's helipad. Their chosen location was dimly lit due to a broken lamp.

At approximately 03:45, a group of three Danish boy scouts, on their way to a jamboree in Finland, were wandering around the ship's decks and chanced upon the victims' sleeping area. According to their witness statements, they saw two people, who they first thought were heavily intoxicated, as they seemed to struggle to stand up. The boy scouts soon realised that both had serious head injuries and were barely conscious, and that the whole area surrounding them was covered in blood. One of the boy scouts approached them, intending to provide first aid, but soon realised that their injuries were far too serious.

The boy scouts alerted the ship's front desk, which ordered the ship's on-call nurse and security operative to the site of the incident. The nurse immediately recognised the severity of the injuries and asked the ship's captain, also in attendance, to request a Finnish Coast Guard rescue helicopter to be dispatched to carry the victims to Turku University Hospital ahead of the ship's arrival in port later that morning. At 05:48, the victims reached the hospital, where Schelkle was pronounced dead on arrival despite attempts by the ship's nurse to resuscitate him during the flight. Taxis was in critical condition with similar injuries, apparently resulting from heavy blows to the head. A chief investigator later described the attack as "especially ferocious".

== Investigation ==
The crime almost certainly took place within the jurisdiction of Åland, but the Finnish Ministry of Interior decided that due to the significant investigative resources required, the Turku regional police force would investigate the matter instead, assisted by the Finnish National Bureau of Investigation (NBI).

The first police investigators and crime scene technicians arrived on the ship at 06:30, while still at sea, on the same helicopter that had transported the victims to hospital. When the ship docked in Turku at 08:10, the police had it surrounded, aiming to seal in the perpetrator who was still thought to be on board.

Police initially planned to interview and video-record all passengers as they disembarked, but soon realised this was not possible due to the sheer numbers involved, with c. 1,400 passengers on board that day, and decided to exclude families with children and the elderly. They had also detained certain persons of interest, including Schmid. The young British man they had associated with was also detained, as he was found in the morning with his clothes stained in blood, though he claimed this was the result of a nose-bleed. Schmid was soon ruled out, but the British man was interviewed repeatedly until forensic studies confirmed that the blood in his clothing was indeed almost certainly his, although due to the 1980s forensic technology this was not wholly conclusive.

1987 Viking Sally murder (Åland)

In August 1987, shortly after the incident, local fishermen discovered a plastic bag full of clothes on the uninhabited skerry of Lilla Björnholm, outside Korpo in the Turku archipelago, only some 200 metres (660 ft) from the sea lane used by ferries to and from Turku. The fishermen left it there, but upon finding it again when they returned a year later, they passed it on to the police. Investigators published the bag's contents, including the fact that a glove found in the bag was monogrammed with initials 'H.K.', and stated that some forensic evidence suggested that the clothes originated from Viking Sally, but this did not lead to a break in the case.

Over the next several years, investigators traced and interviewed as many of the video-recorded passengers as possible; some could never be identified. Investigators sailed on the same ship several times, hoping to find clues, to no avail. As forensic technology advanced, the evidence gathered provided some clues but ultimately not enough to solve the mystery. There were no eyewitnesses to the incident, no useful CCTV footage, and no apparent motive, and Taxis has no recollection of the incident, all of which made solving the crime particularly difficult. Despite the unprecedented scale of the police effort, the investigation was discontinued in the 1990s.

== Murder trial and aftermath ==
In 2019, the police revealed that they had a prime suspect in the case, but would not reveal the suspect's age, sex or nationality, confirming only that the person was alive and thought to have acted alone. They later added that the perpetrator is thought not to have known the victims.

In September 2020, Turku police finally announced that they had solved the case and were passing it on to prosecutors. In December 2020 a district prosecutor announced that homicide charges have been filed against a Danish man born in 1969, one of the former boy scouts who discovered the victims. The trial started on 24 May 2021 in the district court of Southwestern Finland.

The case had originally been investigated as a manslaughter, which has a statutory limit of twenty years; this would have meant that the case could no longer be brought to court. Instead, the charges were murder and attempted murder, which do not expire, and can be brought even after more than thirty years. The prosecutors justified the enhanced charges by noting the exceptionally cruel nature of the act.

In June 2021, the suspect was acquitted on all charges. Had the charges resulted in a conviction, they would have represented the longest offence-to-conviction lead time in Finnish judicial history.

In October 2021, it was reported that the accused had allegedly confessed the murder to two Finnish police investigators in 2016, providing details of the weapon used, although he subsequently recanted this under formal questioning. The alleged confession was made without a defence lawyer or witnesses being present, and was therefore ruled inadmissible by the court hearing the case. The prosecutors appealed this ruling, with the case due before the court of appeal of Turku in 2022, but they later withdrew their appeal, leaving the case unresolved.

== See also ==
- List of unsolved murders (1980–1999)
