= 1986 Viking Sally murder =

Murder aboard a ferry in 1986

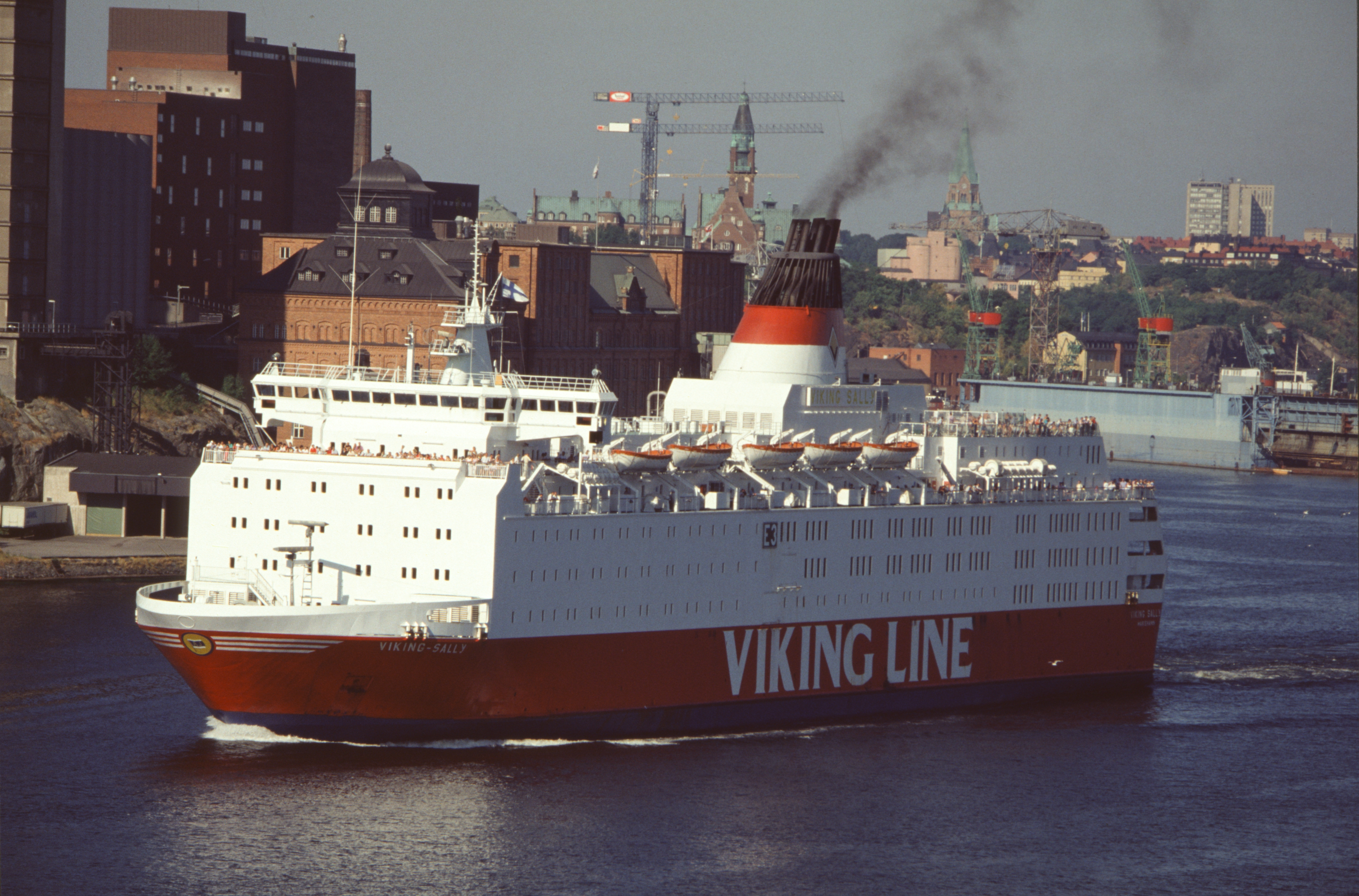
MS Viking Sally, pictured in Stockholm harbour in the 1980s

The 1986 Viking Sally murder took place in July 1986, aboard the cruiseferry MS Viking Sally en route from Turku, Finland, to Stockholm, Sweden, when Reijo Hammar (born 1953) killed businessman Antti Eljaala (born c. 1942). Hammar was later described as the most dangerous known criminal in Finland.

== Murder ==
On the morning of 10 July 1986, towards the end of their journey, Eljaala, Hammar, and an associate of the latter had gone into Eljaala's cabin, where Hammar stole money from Eljaala's wallet. Eljaala intended to report this to the police, but as he was leaving the cabin to do so, Hammar stabbed him five times in the throat with a dinner knife, followed by strangling him to death with a strip of fabric torn from the cabin's bedsheet, assisted by his accomplice.

== Reijo Hammar ==
Hammar was found guilty of murdering Eljaala and sentenced to life imprisonment. Approximately two years later, in July 1988, he escaped from prison with two other inmates, in the process shooting a prison guard in the arm with a sawn-off shotgun. The escapees went on to carry out a number of bank robberies. Hammar later killed one of the men, by hitting him on the head with an axe following an argument. Eventually Hammar was caught in Stockholm, after a few weeks on the run. Due to his record of murders, armed robberies and other serious crimes, he was considered at the time the most dangerous criminal in Finland. Nevertheless, Hammar was pardoned by President Tarja Halonen in December 2004. In 2011, now called Andreas Hammar, he was found guilty of attempted manslaughter.

== Viking Sally ==
The ship in question, MS Viking Sally, was part of the Viking Line ferry fleet, which provides daily cruise ferry services between Sweden, Finland and Åland.

A year after the Eljaala murder, another passenger was murdered on the same ship.

Viking Sally later became MS Estonia, which in 1994 sank in the Baltic Sea claiming 852 lives in one of the worst maritime disasters of the 20th century (after the sinking of the Wilhelm Gustloff in 1945).
