= Baltic Sea cruiseferries =

Ferry operations in the Baltic

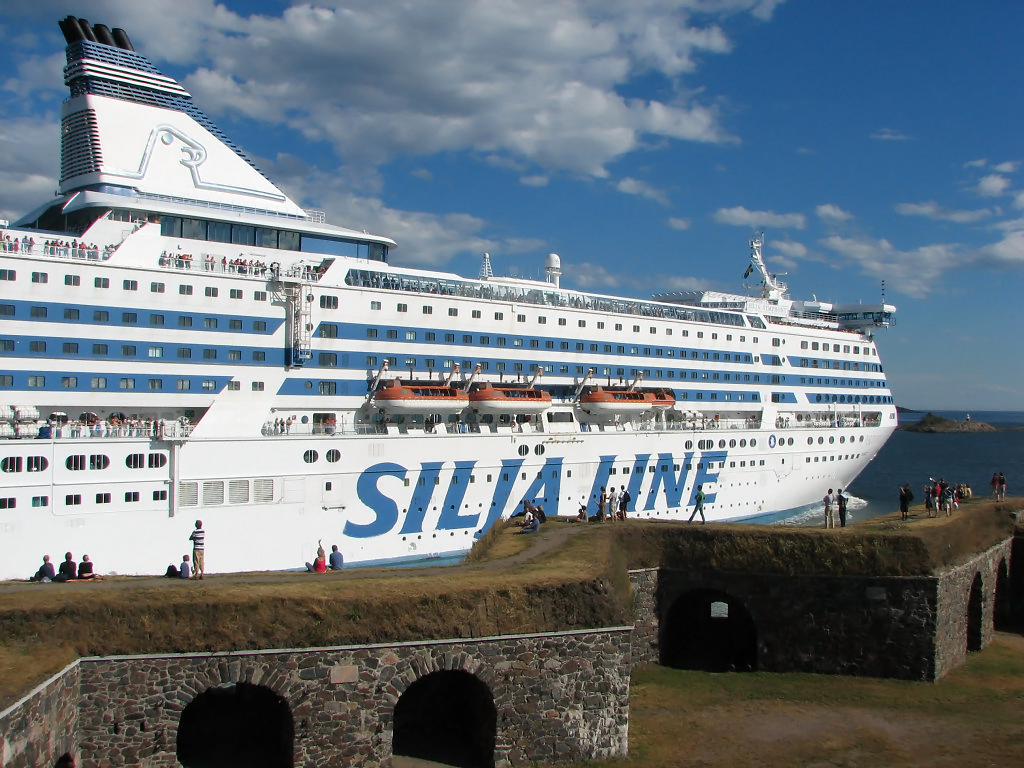
MS Silja Symphony passing through the Kustaanmiekka strait outside Helsinki, Finland on its route to Stockholm, Sweden via Mariehamn

The Baltic Sea is crossed by several cruiseferry lines. Some important shipping companies are Viking Line, Silja Line, Tallink and Eckerö Line.

== Overview ==
In the northern Baltic Sea, two major rival companies, Viking Line and Silja Line, have for decades competed on the routes between Turku and Helsinki in Finland and Sweden's capital Stockholm. Since the 1990s Tallink has also risen as a major company in the area, culminating with acquisition of Silja Line in 2006.

While superficially resembling cruise ships that operate primarily in tropical climates, Baltic cruiseferries will have windows rather than balconies for cabins/suites, plus a higher hull and promenade deck with higher positioning of lifeboats (the height above water called the freeboard), a longer bow, and for additional strength they are often designed with thicker hull plating than is found on cruise ships, as well as a deeper draft for greater stability. Cruise ferries share these above attributes with ocean liners in order to protect against the large waves and cold stormy weather, since cruise ferries are expected to ply the Baltic Sea year-round while cruise ships can only do so in the summer.

The largest Baltic cruiseferries offer many of the amenities found on contemporary cruise ships, including a wide range of restaurants, entertainment options, and health and fitness facilities. However, on cruiseferries, many of these facilities such as the pool deck and shopping arcade are fully enclosed due to the cool Baltic climate. Cruiseferry cabins are typically smaller as voyages are only one or two nights, plus food is generally not included in cruise ferry fares, whereas cruise ships usually have itineraries lasting three nights or more and fares are all inclusive.

== Eastern Baltic ==
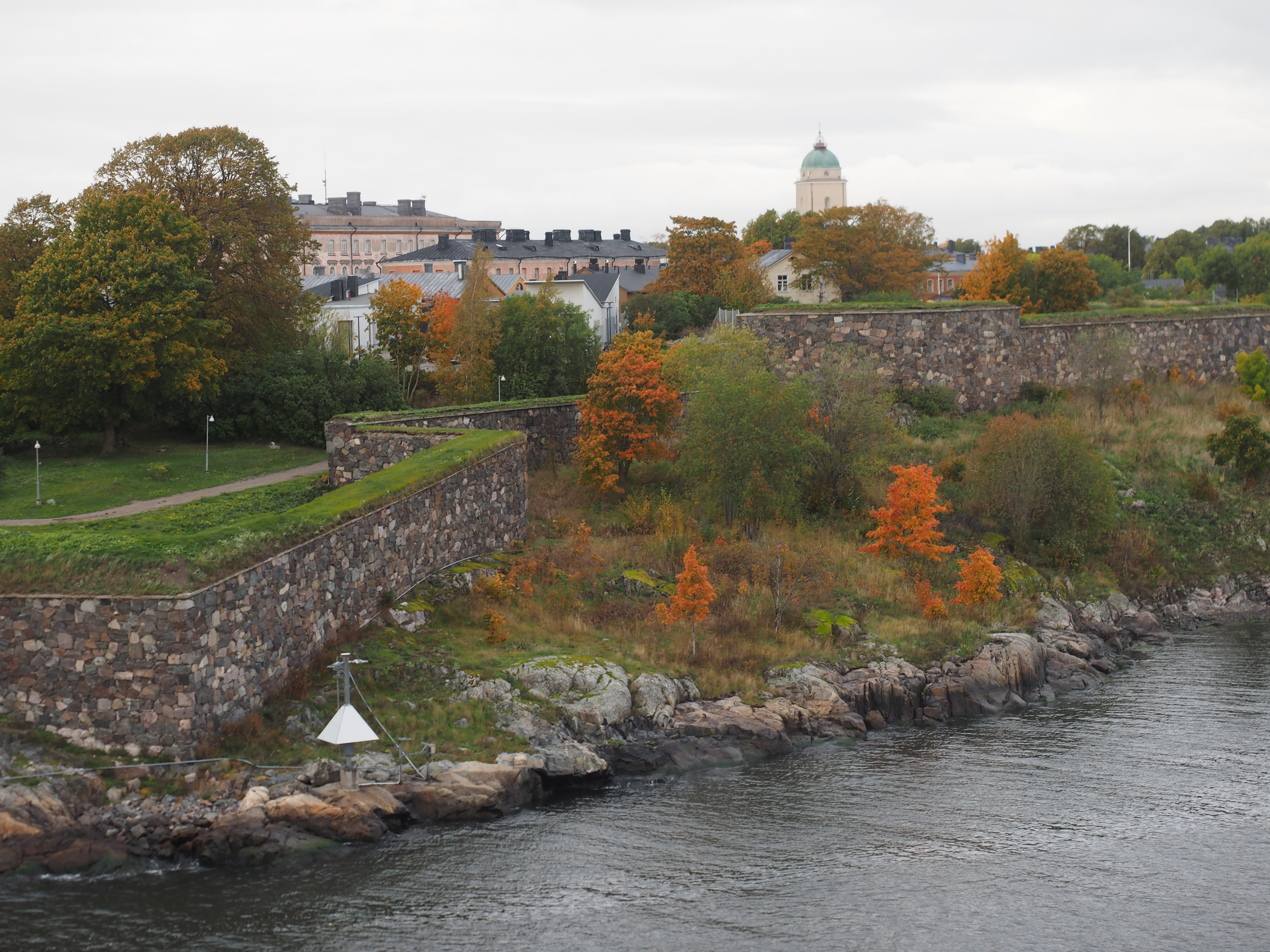
Upon departure from or arrival to Helsinki, Baltic sea cruiseferries pass the island fortress of Suomenlinna.

Tallink and Viking Line operate competing cruiseferries on the routes Stockholm - Turku and Stockholm - Helsinki, calling in Åland (Mariehamn or Långnäs). Additionally, Tallink sails Stockholm - Mariehamn - Tallinn. Tallink, Viking Line and Eckerö Line compete on the Helsinki - Tallinn route, which is also the busiest route in the Baltic Sea, travelled by over 6 million people in 2008. The fact that this route is so busy (a further 270,380 people flew between Tallinn Airport and Helsinki Airport in 2018) has led to calls for a Helsinki–Tallinn Tunnel.

Baltic routes are mostly served by new ships purpose-built for the routes. Older cruiseferries from the Baltic serve as ferries on other seas, or in some cases, as cruise ships.

Viking Line and Eckerölinjen also operate short routes from Sweden to Åland, sailing on Kapellskär - Mariehamn and Grisslehamn - Berghamn. Birka Line, owned by Eckerö, also operates short cruises out of Stockholm.

Generally, GTS Finnjet of 1977 is considered to have been the first cruiseferry, she was the first ferry to offer cruise-ship quality services and accommodations, and the first generation of cruiseferries operating from Finland to Sweden were highly influenced by Finnjet's interior and exterior designs. After the fall of the Soviet Union the route connecting Helsinki to Tallinn became highly lucrative, which led to Estonia-based company Tallink to grow and rival the two long-established companies (Viking Line and Silja Line). Eventually, Tallink purchased Silja Line in 2006.

The size of Baltic cruiseferries is limited by various narrow passages in the Stockholm, Ålandian and Turku archipelagos, meaning ships that traffic these routes can't be much larger than 200 meters. The single narrowest point is Kustaanmiekka strait outside Helsinki, although ships making port at the city's west harbour do not have to pass through the strait. Viking and Silja Line have wished to keep their terminals in the South Harbour, however, as it is located right next to the city center. The longest ships to maintain scheduled service through the Kustaanmiekka strait were MS Finnstar and her sisters with a length of 219 meters. The longest ship to have ever navigated through the narrows past Suomenlinna sea fortress was MS Oriana (260 m), but that was only possible due to extremely good weather conditions.

=== Tax-free sales ===
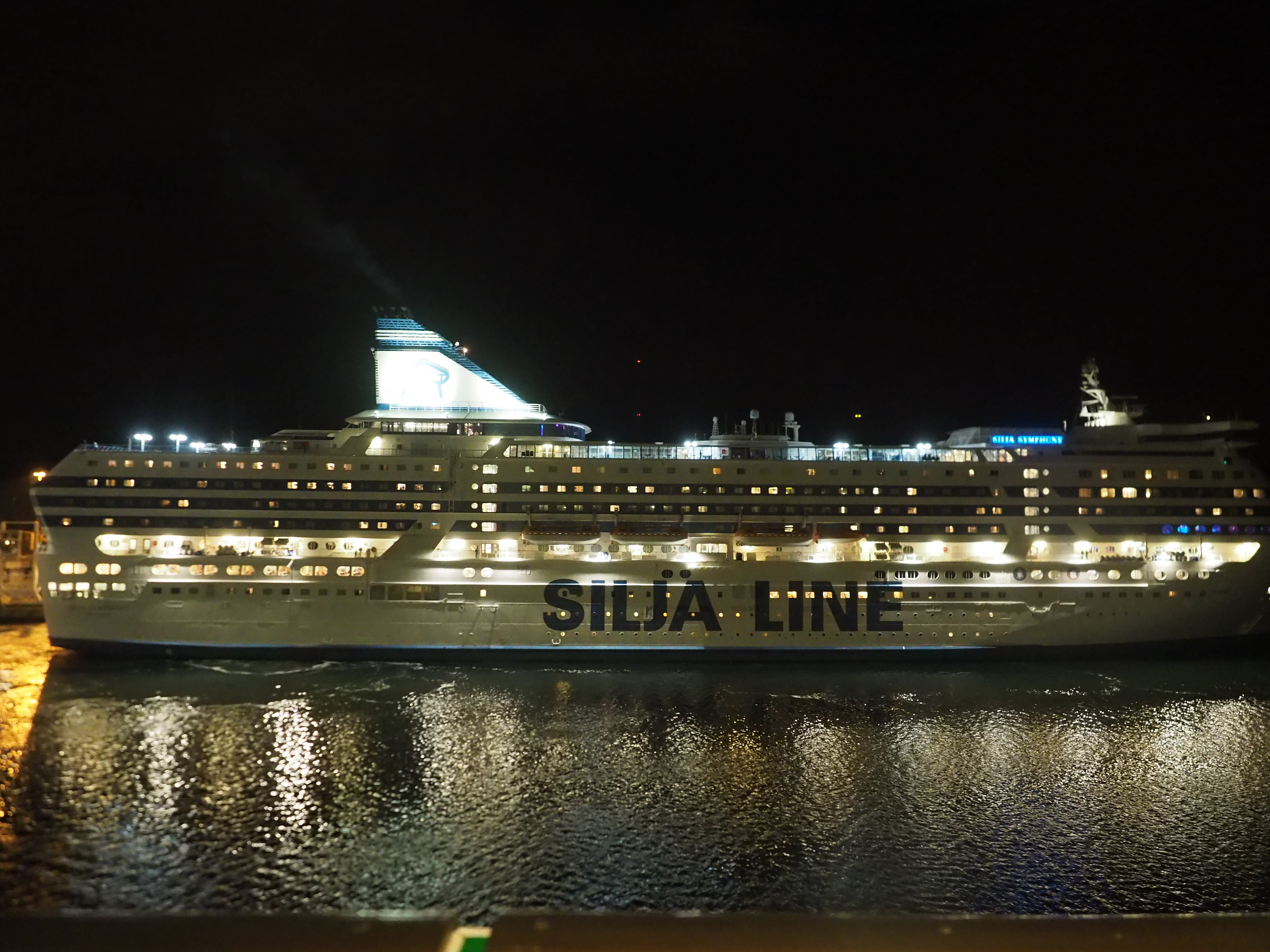
To allow for duty-free sales on routes between Finland and Sweden, Baltic Sea cruiseferries stop in Åland on the way. This often happens in the middle of the night, and the ships stay at the Åland Islands for less than an hour.

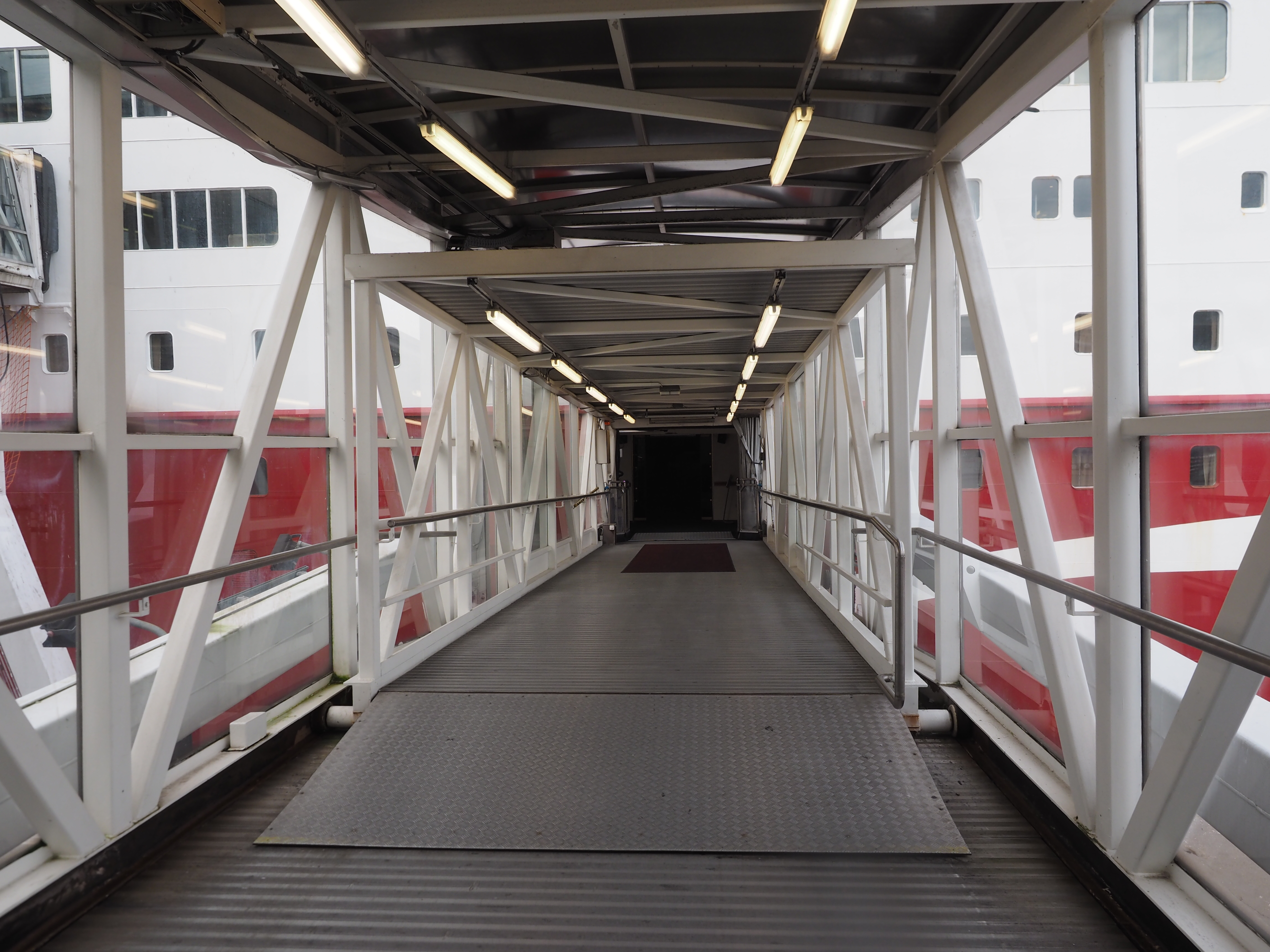
Passengers board and depart the ships via gangways connecting the ship directly to the terminal building.

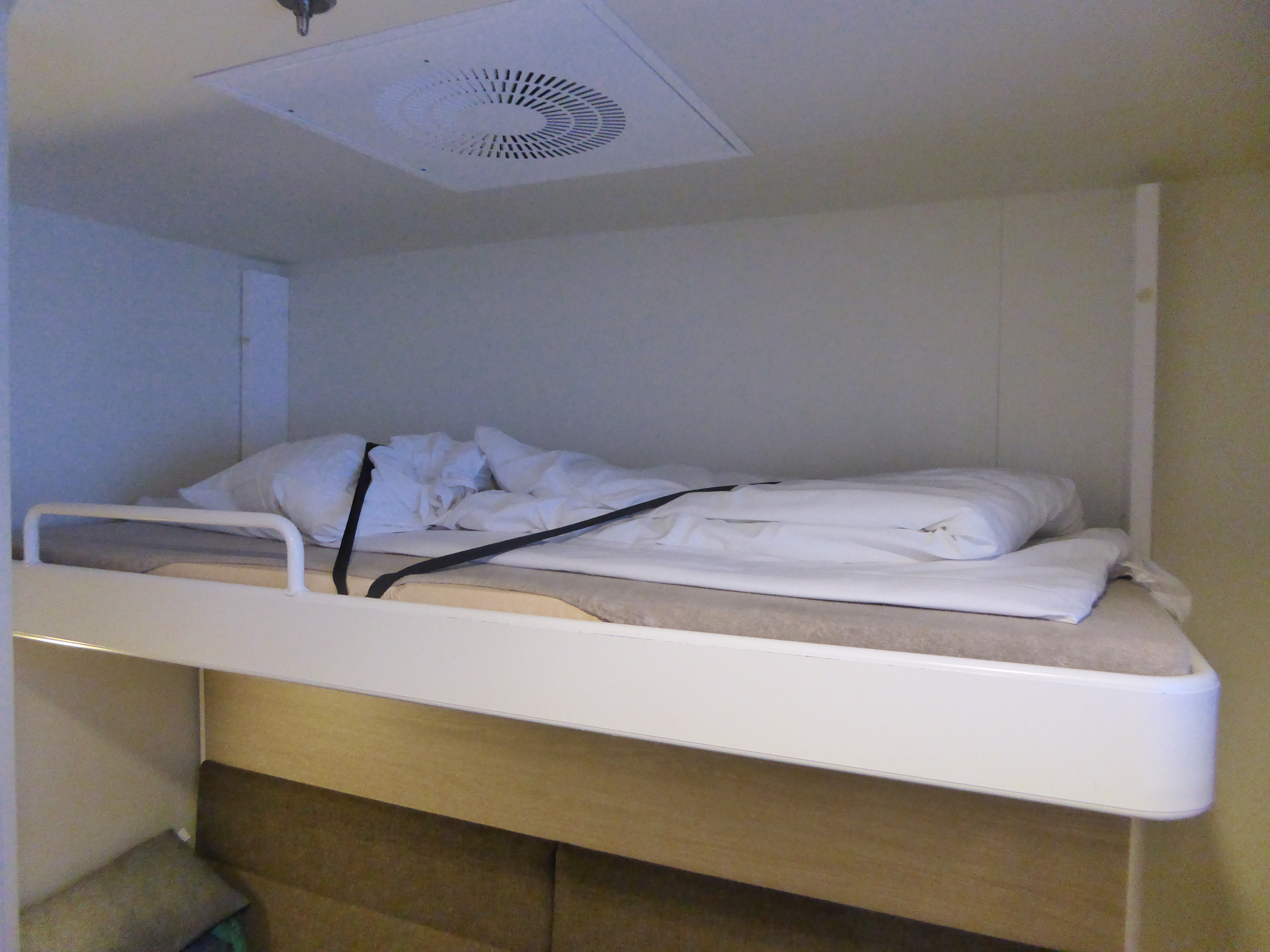
Smaller cabins on cruiseferries typically have bunk beds.

The expansion of the European Union has limited the growth of the industry as duty-free sales on intra-EU routes are no longer possible. However, as Åland is outside the EU customs zone, duty-free sales are still possible on routes making a stop at Mariehamn or other harbours on the islands. Another popular destination is Estonia with its lower taxes on alcohol.

The ferries have been criticized because of the low prices of alcoholic beverages which encourage passengers to become drunk and act irresponsibly. Due to the relatively cheap price of the cruises and availability of duty-free alcohol (which makes it considerably cheaper than on "land" as both Finland and Sweden have a relatively strict taxation of alcohol) many big parties involving vast amounts of alcohol consumption are held on the ships.

Many Finns also buy snus from ferries as its sale is illegal in Finland due to EU regulations.

== Accidents and incidents ==
- 10 July 1986, a murder took place onboard MS Viking Sally, and approximately a year after that, on 28 July 1987, another one. Viking Sally was later renamed Estonia.
- 14 January 1993, MS Jan Heweliusz sank near Rügen island, claiming 55 lives.
- 4 March 1994, MS Sally Albatros ran aground near Porkkala, causing her to partly sink.
- 28 September 1994, MS Estonia sank claiming 852 lives.
- 19 January 2009, MS Rosella had to anchor just outside Mariehamn, Åland due to water in its fuel. When weighing the anchor, she hooked the cables of internet traffic to Åland.
- 29 August 2009, a fire was extinguished on MS Finnfellow, carrying 74 passengers at the time.
- 9 October 2010, MS Lisco Gloria caught fire while travelling through Fehmarn Belt. All 204 passengers and 32 crewmembers were rescued, but the ship was deemed a constructive total loss.
- 20 September 2020 MS Amorella ran aground in the Åland Archipelago on her route from Turku to Stockholm. All 207 passengers and 25 of the 74 crew members were evacuated. The incident only caused damage to the ship, leaving the passengers unharmed.
- 21 November 2020, MS Viking Grace ran aground while attempting to dock at Mariehamn en route from Stockholm to Turku. (Note: The ship was travelling from Stockholm to Turku, not from Turku to Stockholm as it says in the cited BBC article.) The ship was towed into the harbour overnight and the 331 passengers and 98 crew, who had slept on board, were evacuated later that morning. No investigation was started about the incident.

== Cruiseferries as a cultural phenomenon ==
Many Finns have made their first trip abroad on a cruiseferry. In the first decades, when fashion phenomena arrived in Sweden significantly earlier than in Finland, Stockholm showed people what Finland would look like after a couple of years. According to journalist Riku Rantala, a cruiseferry trip is still a manifestation of Finnish culture, like a part of modern folklore: "The ferries offer escapism, glamour and a promise of adventure".

In the 1990s several organizations held seminars on the cruiseferries instead of in hotels.

== History ==
In the early 20th century it was possible to take a personal car over the Baltic Sea as cargo on a passenger of cargo ship, with about twenty cars lifted onto a ship by a container crane. Passenger ship traffic over the Baltic Sea started improving in the 1950s, when the Nordic Passport Union came into force in 1954 and the number of personal cars in Finland started increasing despite the need for import licenses. However, the Finns were averse to driving in Sweden because of the left-hand traffic until 1967 when Sweden too switched to right-hand traffic. Traffic by charter buses from Finland to Sweden and thereafter to middle and southern Europe also increased since the 1950s.

When car ferry traffic across the Øresund strait between Denmark and Sweden started, the Finnish Car Club, the Road Traffic Association and the Finnish Truck Association started pressuring shipping companies to improve car ferry traffic between Finland and Sweden. The first car ferry connection between Finland and Sweden was a route over the Kvarken, the narrowest part of the Gulf of Bothnia, from Vaasa to Umeå, where the ship Korsholm III of the shipping company Ab Vasa-Umeå started trafficking in December 1958. A group of shipping companies having cooperated for decades, the Finnish Bore and SHO-FÅA (later Effoa) and the Swedish Rederi AB Svea found each other in this regard too and founded a joint company named Oy Siljavarustamo - Ab Siljarederiet in 1957 to handle the ferry traffic. The passenger steam ship SS Silja from Turku and the cargo steam ship SS Warjo from Helsinki were not car ferries as such. Siljavarustamo ordered its first car ferry in 1959, when a competing shipping company Vikinglinjen had entered the market with its car ferry SS Viking, which first trafficked from Galtby in Korpo via Mariehamn to Gräddö in Norrtälje, until its traffic switched to Pargas in Finland to Kapellskär in Sweden.

=== The first proper car ferries ===
The ship MS Skandia was built in the Wärtsilä shipyard for Silja's Turku-Norrtälje route in 1961, which was the first ship in Finland to have a roll-through car deck with aft and bow gates. Rederi AB Slite converted its cargo ship MS Slite to a car ferry in 1959 to traffic between Mariehamn and Simpnäs in Sweden. In 1964 Slite received the recently completed car ferry MS Apollo, with its red-painted sides bearing the marketing name Ålandspilen, meaning "the Åland Arrow" in Swedish. The fourth cruiseferry company was Ålandsfärjan founded in 1963, with its first namesake ferry having been converted from the 1933 ship SS Brittany trafficking over the English Channel. It started traffic between Mariehamn and Gräddö in Sweden. In autumn 1964 and 1965 the ship Wappen von Hamburg of the Swedish Stena Line trafficked between Turku and Stockholm, first under the name Jätten Finn and then under the name MacFinn, with its highlights being a dance restaurant, bingo and roulette. Stena Line also transported passengers in summer 1966 between Kemi and Luleå with its small ship Afrodite. In 1966 Vikinglinjen, Slite and Ålandsfärjan now known as SF-Line founded a common marketing company Viking Line and adopted the red colour of Slite's Apollo as the theme colour of all their ships. Soon also Siljavarustamo was discontinued and replaced with a joint marketing company between three shipping companies called Silja Line in 1971. Before this the group's four companies had been marketing their car ferry trips under the simple name Ruotsinlaivat ("Ships to Sweden"), including "train-ship-train" packages in cooperation with the Finnish and Swedish railway companies.

=== Price contests and fun cruises ===
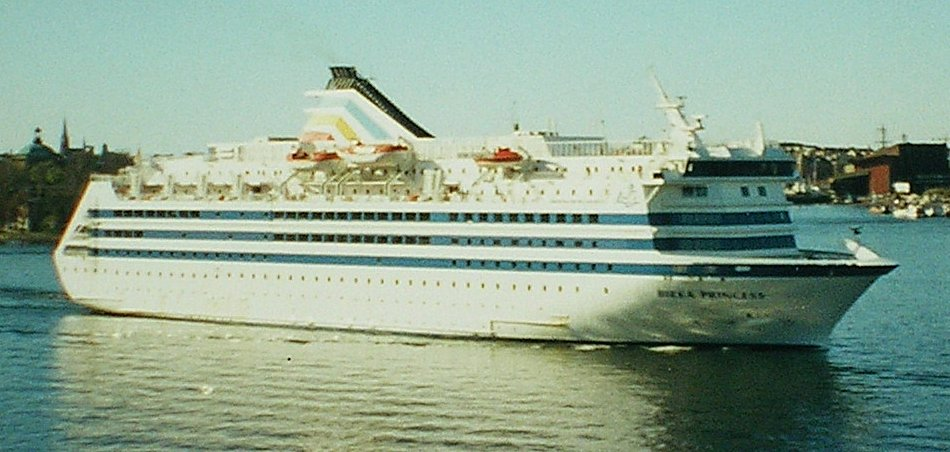
MS Birka Princess in Stockholm

The international truck traffic needed cruiseferry traffic on the Baltic Sea more and more in the 1960s, because the truck traffic had increased after the buying power of the Finns had strengthened and Finnish export trade had been directed to the western market instead of the Soviet Union after the war reparations had been paid in full. Since the national holiday law 1960, the amount of free time the Finns had had increased to 18 to 24 days per year. Also the frequent immigration to Sweden in the 1960s increased need and demand for cruiseferry travel. On national holidays and in summertime the cruiseferries were packed with Sweden Finns coming to visit their relatives. The newspaper Helsingin Sanomat described the elbow tactics of deck passengers on fully-booked night trips on cruiseferries. According to the writer, politeness on a ferry was not a good idea, because if one was polite, they were left without a seat, much less a cabin: "If you even after this acted politely, you were left without food, drink and snacks". Off-season, the ferries attracted passengers by even offering deck tickets for free to spend money on board on tax-free shopping and restaurant services. Mere deck tickets were enough for many: instead of expensive cabins, many people on night-time ferry trips either kept awake for the entire night or slept on indoor chairs or in sleeping bags on the outer deck or in the corridors. Journalist Maija Dahlgren wondered in the magazine Suomen Kuvalehti in 1971 how passengers who had come to the ferry just for the travel had to endure raging, vomiting, shouting expletives and crazy partying, while the ferry crew could do nothing more than futilely spread their arms about it.

Along with the cruiseferries, Swedish people also started to get interested about visiting continental Finland, but especially about short alcohol-infused pleasure trips to the Åland islands and back. Eckerö Linjen had transported passengers and cars to Mariehamn from Grissleholm in Sweden already since 1960, and for summer 1961 Effoa experimented with a fast passenger traffic connection from Stockholm to Mariehamn on the hydrofoil ship Sirena. After ten years, traffic between Sweden and Åland was joined by the Ålandian company Birka Line in 1971 and the Stockholmian company Ånedin-Linjen, named after the TV series The Onedin Line, in 1973. Birka Line's MS Birka Princess became known as the fictional cruiseferry Freja from the Swedish TV series Rederiet (1992–2002).

=== From ferries to entertainment centres ===
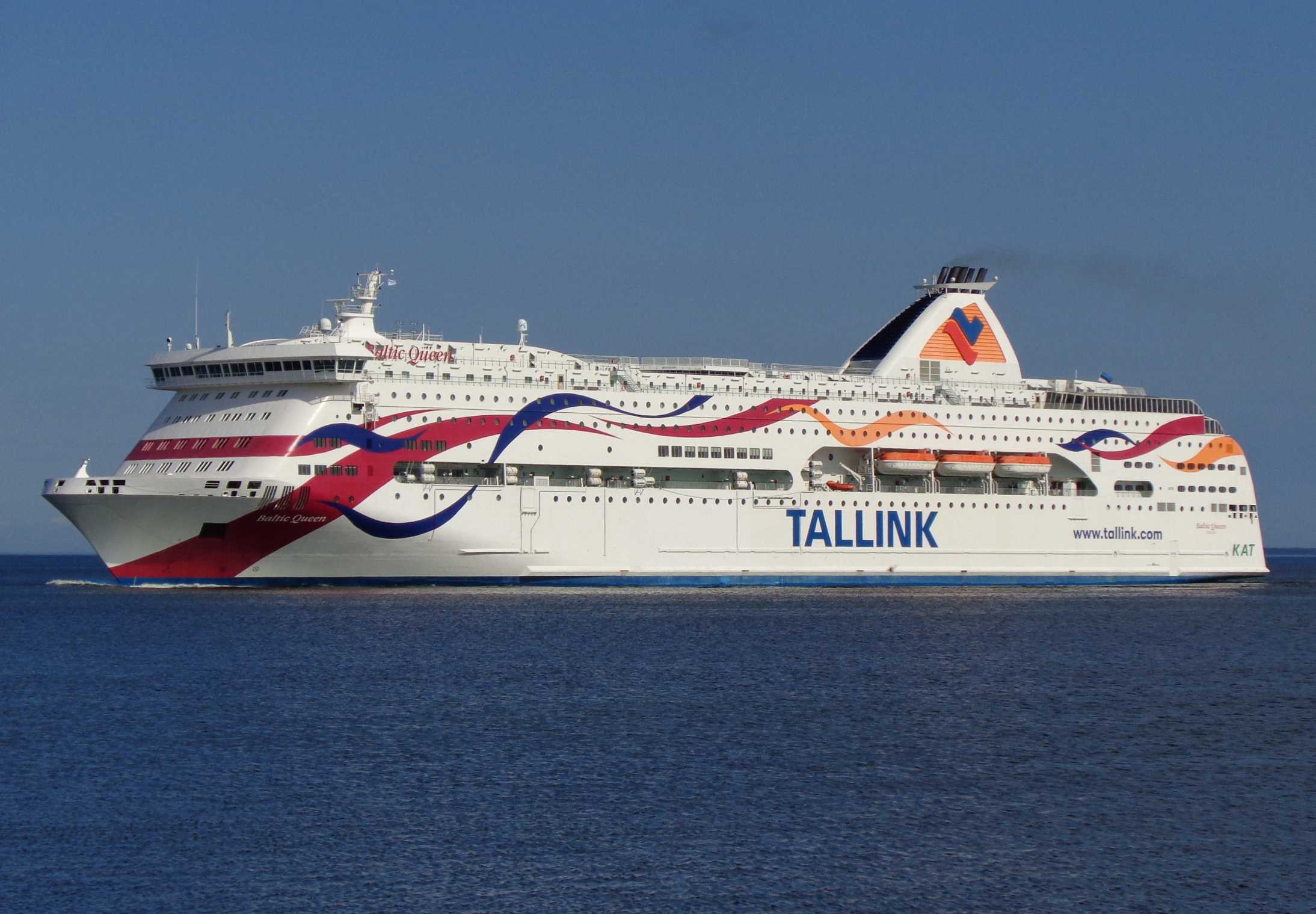
MS Baltic Queen underway

When the main selling point of the cruiseferries in the 1960s was fast and cheap passage over the sea, this was overshadowed by relaxed entertainment on board in the 1970s. This was influenced by the 24-hour rule which had come into force in Finland at the turn of the decade: a trip abroad had to last at least 24 hours before the passengers had the right to bring tax-free alcohol and tobacco bought on board to Finland. So the ferries started trafficking from Helsinki to Stockholm in 1972 to lengthen a two-way trip to over 24 hours. The first ferries to depart from Helsinki were Silja Line's MS Aallotar and MS Svea Regina, and in 1974 Viking Line brought their own ships to the route, the German-built Viking 5 and the Canadian-bought 1967 ship Viking 6. At the same time, conference trips among corporations and organisations became a new business for the ferries: the 1975 Silja Line ships MS Svea Corona and MS Wellamo on the Helsinki route had conference rooms for 150 people.

Tax-free products on ferries were sold in small on-board kiosks in the 1960, until the first tax free stores were opened on Silja's MS Fennia and Viking Line's MS Apollo in 1970. MS Fennia also had a swimming pool for the first time. At the same time the first night clubs appeared on the ferries. The first discotheque on Viking Line's ships was under the car deck of the 1979 ship MS Turella. In the 1970s the ferries also started having ball pits for children.

In the 1980s the size of the cruiseferries grew rapidly: in 1993 the total gross tonnage of the Finnish cruiseferries was over 84 percent larger than in 1980, even though the number of the ferries had diminished by 28 percent from 43 to 31. The shipping companies renovated their ships at a fast pace as it was economically feasible: after a few years of use, the ships could be sold for more money than they had originally cost, usually to foreign buyers. Also the number of passengers grew twofold during the 1980s, up to over 11 million passengers in 1990. The selection of services also grew, and the ferries became popular entertainment centres, competing more with spa hotels than with other ways of travel across the sea, with swimming pool departments and visit by top artists. In 1987 40 percent of Silja Line's revenue came from travel tickets, another 40 percent from restaurant and tax free sales and the remaining 20 percent from cargo traffic. The respective figures for Viking Line were about a third each. In contrast, one half of the revenue of Wasa Line was from tax-free sales in restaurants and shops. In 1990, Time magazine listed Viking Line as the ninth largest vendor of tax-free products in the world in a listing mostly consisting of international airports.

Cruiseferry traffic also expanded on the Gulf of Bothnia in the 1980s, where Wasa Line had to compete with Folkline trafficking from Kaskinen to Gävle (1982–1984) and its successor KG-Line (1986–1989) and Jakob Lines trafficking from Jakobstad and Kokkola to Skellefteå and Örnsköldsvik. During the early 1990s depression in Finland, Wasa Line had full control over the traffic across the Gulf of Bothnia once again after it had acquired Jakob Lines and KG-Line had gone out of business.

In the early 1990s the shipping companies suffered from the bankruptcy of Wärtsilä Marine at a time when both Viking Line and Silja Line had new ships in construction at the shipyard. Getting the bankruptcy clear took 24 years and produced a line of documents 50 metres long. The early 1990s depression hit the business after the bankruptcy of Wärtsilä Marine, and the ferries to Sweden had to compete with ferry traffic to Estonia which had become free after the country had regained independence. One of the companies within the Viking group, Rederi Ab Sally, had gone under Silja Line's ownership because of financial difficulties in 1987. In 1993 Rederi Ab Slite in the Viking group went bankrupt, and the sole company left was SF Line, which changed into Viking Line Oyj and discontinued the former marketing cooperative.

=== Difficulties and fusions in the 2000s ===
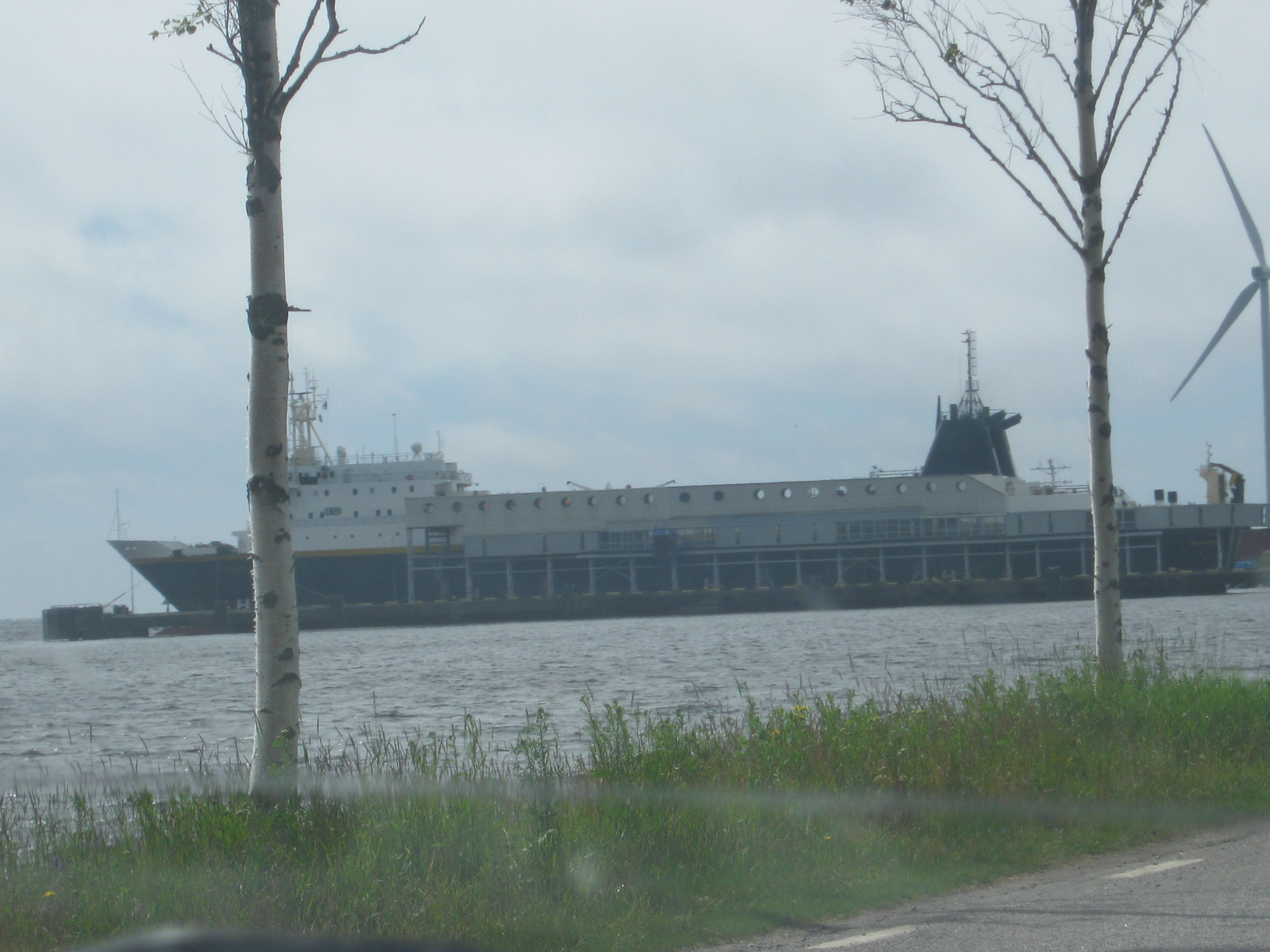
MS RG I at the Umeå harbour in July 2012

After Finland and Sweden had joined the European Union the countries had to fit in with the prohibition of tax-free sales of alcohol and tobacco products in intra-EU transport in early July 1999. The solution was found in Åland's position in travel between Finland and Sweden: the area of the autonomous region is considered a "third area" in indirect taxation, allowing for tax-free sales of products in transport between Åland and other EU member states. In practice, this meant that all cruiseferries between Finland and Sweden have since made a quick stop at Åland to fulfil the condition of the edict. For ferries on northern routes this was not possible, so tax-free sales on the northern ferries ended completely in 1999. Silja Line soon ceased all activities of Wasa Line, but this was replaced by RG Line founded by the Vaasa restaurant and hotel entrepreneur Rabbe Grönblom, which ended up going bankrupt in 2011. After this the city of Vaasa and the municipality of Umeå founded a common shipping company, NLC Ferry, to handle traffic over the Kvarken under the marketing name Wasaline on the ferry MS Wasa Express which had already trafficked the route before.

Ferries on the Turku-Stockholm and Naantali-Kapellskär routes started using the Långnäs harbour in Lumparland on 1 July 1999, which had previously been in passenger ship use in the middle 1970s and was now reopened after renovation. Stopping at Långnäs along the way saves an hour of traffic time compared to the daytime ferries stopping at Mariehamn.

At the turn of the millennium, the cruiseferry companies underwent difficulties also for other reasons than new regulations on tax-free sales. Sales profits started to diminish when Estonia joined the EU in 2004 and Finland had to lower the taxation of alcoholic beverages to avoid excessive "booze hoarding" from Estonia. Silja Line had the most difficulties and ended up sold to the British-American company Sea Containers in 2004. However, Sea Containers itself soon went bankrupt and sold Silja Line to Tallink in 2006, which was a smaller company than Silja Line but was the most financially stable along the Baltic Sea cruiseferry companies. Maritime professor Jorma Taina has estimated that the "huge hotel department stores" on the Helsinki-Stockholm route had come to the end of their life and saw the future of the Baltic Sea transport in the ropax ships that were more modest than the cruiseferries and combined passenger cabins with effective cargo spaces. In addition to Tallink and Viking Line, Finnlines also started to concentrate on ropax ships, of which it ordered five from the Italian shipyard Fincantieri and deployed some of them on the route from Finland to Sweden. The same passenger group "without need for humppa and karaoke" was sought by SeaWind Line owned by Silja Line and then by Tallink, trafficking the Turku-Stockholm route from the 1990s to 2008.

Around 2017 Estonia overtook Sweden for the first time as the most popular ship travel destination among the Finns. On the other hand, travel to Finland among the Swedes has increased.

=== The greater effect of the cruiseferries ===
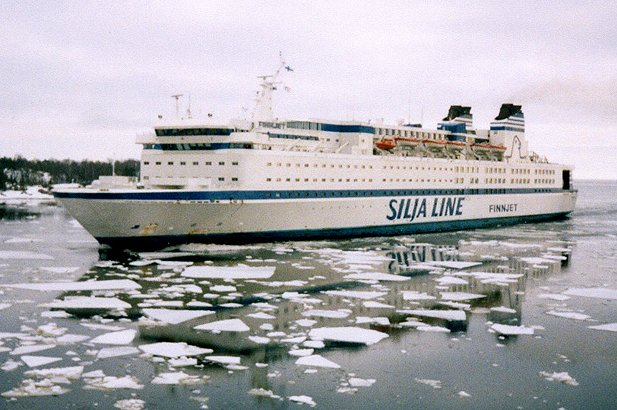
Finnjet approaching Helsinki in spring 2004

The frequent passenger and car traffic between Finland and Sweden served as an inspiration and development of cruiseferry operations worldwide, particularly from Finland and Sweden to other destinations. The largest and fastest cruiseferry in the world, GTS Finnjet was built at the Wärtsilä Helsinki shipyard in 1977, which trafficked from Helsinki to Travemünde in Germany. Already a decade before Finnlines had trafficked to Travemünde and Visby in Gotland first on the MS Hansa Express from Hanko and then on the MS Finnhansa and the MS Finnpartner from Helsinki. In the early 1990s, Hango Line tried to improve the Hanko-Visby route, and the Swedish company Jetson tried to improve the Pori-Sundsvall route previously trafficked by Wasa Line in the early 1970s, but neither of these attempts made it past the planning stage.

The Wärtsilä shipyard's experience in cruiseferry construction starting from Ilmatar, Fennia and Nordia in the early 1960s expanded to international cruiseferries in 1968, when a Norwegian shipping company ordered the MS Song of Norway from Finland.

After the Soviet Union had disbanded and the Baltic countries had regained inpendence, new ferry routes started rapidly appearing from Helsinki and Stockholm to Tallinn and other coastal cities on the Baltic Sea. After Estonia, Sweden and Finland had joined the European Union the Baltic Sea cruiseferry traffic became an important factor among free travel of tourists, goods and workforce between Finland, Sweden and Estonia. This created a need for other kinds of ships than cruiseferries along the different-length routes on the Baltic Sea, especially after tax-free sales had ended at the turn of the millennium. In addition to cruiseferries and ropax ships, other types of ships also appeared to serve the short route from Helsinki to Tallinn, such as Linda Line's hydrofoil ships and catamarans and SuperSeaCat's pump-jet express ships. Among the first cruiseferries especially designed for the Helsinki-Tallinn route as the fast 2008 ship MS Viking XPRS, which became the ferry to transport the most passengers along the route in the 2010s.

== Criticism ==
The Baltic Sea cruiseferries and travel on them are a multi-faceted phenomenon of life, which has received diverse criticism, mostly because of environmental reasons. The pollution caused by the cruiseferries was at its worst after the 1973 oil crisis when the ferries used heavy fuel oil containing even three percent sulfur. The ferries later switched to lighter fuel oil and other technical solutions were also sought. For example, from 1988 to 1990 the ferries' sulfur dioxide emissions were reduced from 300 tonnes to 50 tonnes per year. Navigating larger and larger ships through narrow straits and at tightly packed piers at city centres has been a subject of discussion both at the Stockholm Archipelago and on the Finnish coast. The large cruiseferries are said to bring the wave situations from the outer archipelago to the inner archipelago, which changes the collection of species and furthers eutrophication.

Maritime safety issues become a point for some time every time something happens to the Baltic Sea cruiseferries. The largest controversy, which led to various actions, resulted from the sinking of the MS Estonia in September 1994.

About 60 percent of the state income originally meant for cargo ships and other utilitarian ships, explained with national security, went to "entertainment maritime transit" meaning passenger ships in the middle 2010s.

Tens of people have disappeared from the cruiseferries throughout the decades, almost all of them young men. Journalist Riku Rantala has investigated the matter and has published a four-hour podcast called M/S Mystery about the matter in 2022.

== Citations ==
=== Bibliography ===
- Peter, Bruce (2009). Baltic Ferries. Ramsey, Isle of Man: Ferry Publications. ISBN 9781906608057.
