= Regina Baltica =

1980 ferry

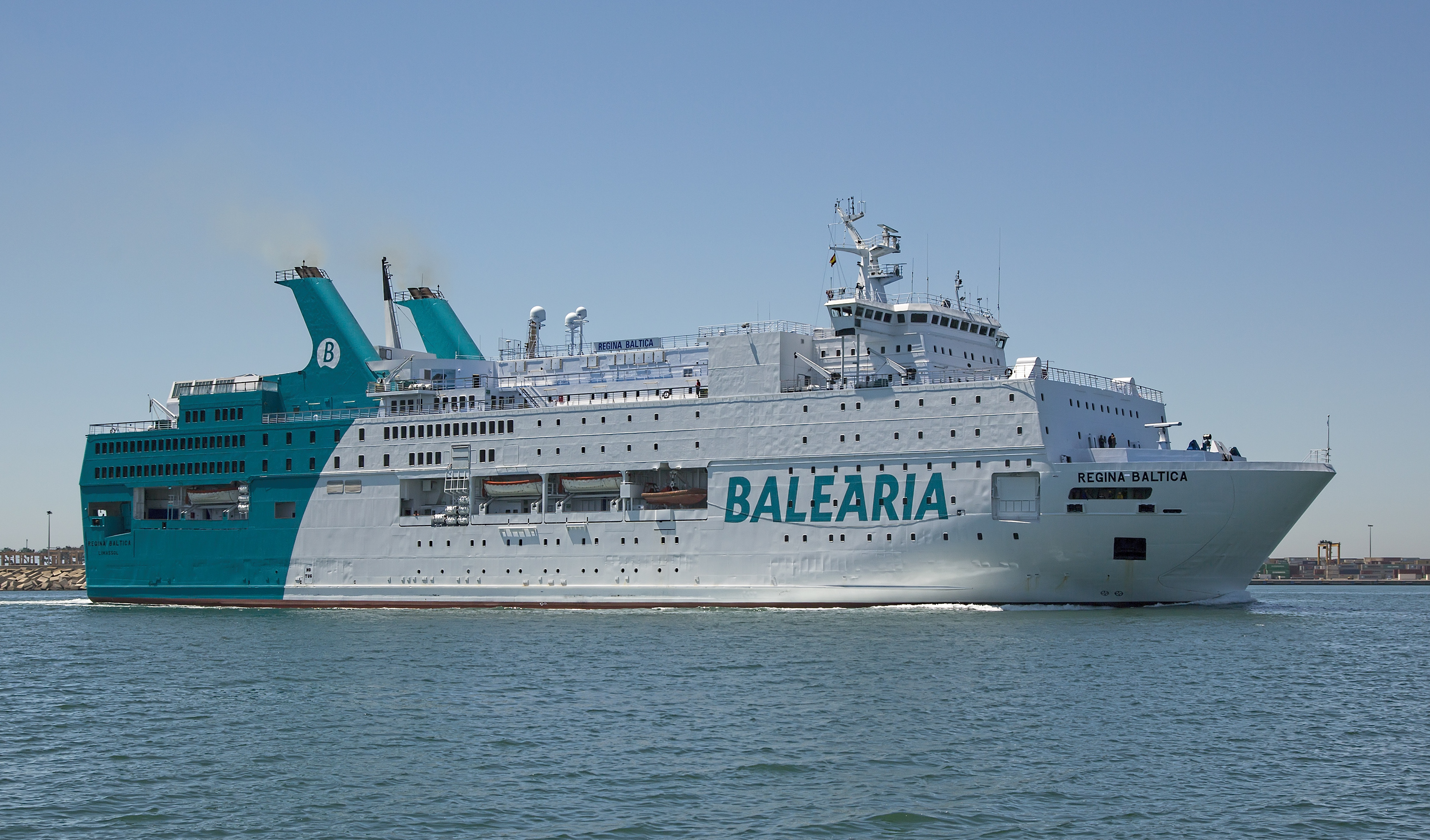
- MS Regina Baltica at Valencia in 2017

History
- Name: 1980–1985: Viking Song; 1985–1991: Braemar; 1991–1996: Anna Karenina; 1996–present: Regina Baltica
- Owner: 1980–1985: Rederi Ab Sally; 1985–1996: Fred. Olsen; 1996–1997: Nordström & Thulin; 1997–2002: Estonian Shipping Company; 2002–2015: Tallink; 2015–2017: Scandinavian Interests; 2017–present: Balearia
- Operator: 1980–1985: Rederi Ab Sally (in Viking Line traffic); 1985–1990: Fred. Olsen Lines; 1991–1996: Baltic Line; 1996–2001: Estline; 2001–2009: Tallink; 2009 (June – September): Acciona Trasmediterránea; 2010 (May -September): Acciona Trasmediterránea; 2010 (September–October): Strandfaraskip Landsins; 2011 (June–September): Acciona Trasmediterránea; 2012 (from February): Floating Hotel in Sheringham, England
- Port of registry: 1980–1985: Mariehamn, Finland; 1985–1991: Kristiansand, Norway; 1991–1996: Saint Petersburg, Russia; 1996: Limassol, Cyprus; 1996–2006: Tallinn, Estonia; 2006–2015: Riga, Latvia
- Route: Valencia–Nador
- Builder: Wärtsilä Perno shipyard, Turku, Finland
- Yard number: 1248
- Launched: 15 February 1980
- Acquired: 29 August 1980
- Maiden voyage: 1980
- In service: 30 August 1980
- Identification: Call sign: YLBP; MMSI number: 275054000; IMO number: 7827225
- Status: In service

General characteristics (as built)
- Type: Cruiseferry
- Tonnage: 13,878 GRT; 13,900 GT(current); 2,830 DWT
- Length: 145.19 m (476 ft 4 in)
- Beam: 25.51 m (83 ft 8 in)
- Draught: 5.52 m (18 ft 1 in)
- Decks: 12
- Ice class: 1 A
- Installed power: 4 × Wärtsilä-Pielstick 12 PC2SV; 19.480 kW (combined)
- Propulsion: 2 propellers; 2 bow thrusters
- Speed: 21.3 knots (39.4 km/h; 24.5 mph)
- Capacity: 2,000 passengers; 1,250 passenger berths; 462 cars

MS Regina Baltica is a cruiseferry owned by the Spanish shipping company Balearia. She was built in 1980 as Viking Song by Wärtsilä Perno shipyard, Finland for Rederi Ab Sally, one of the owners of the Viking Line consortium. She has also sailed under the names Braemar (for Fred Olsen Lines) and Anna Karenina (for Baltic Shipping Co.).

== History ==
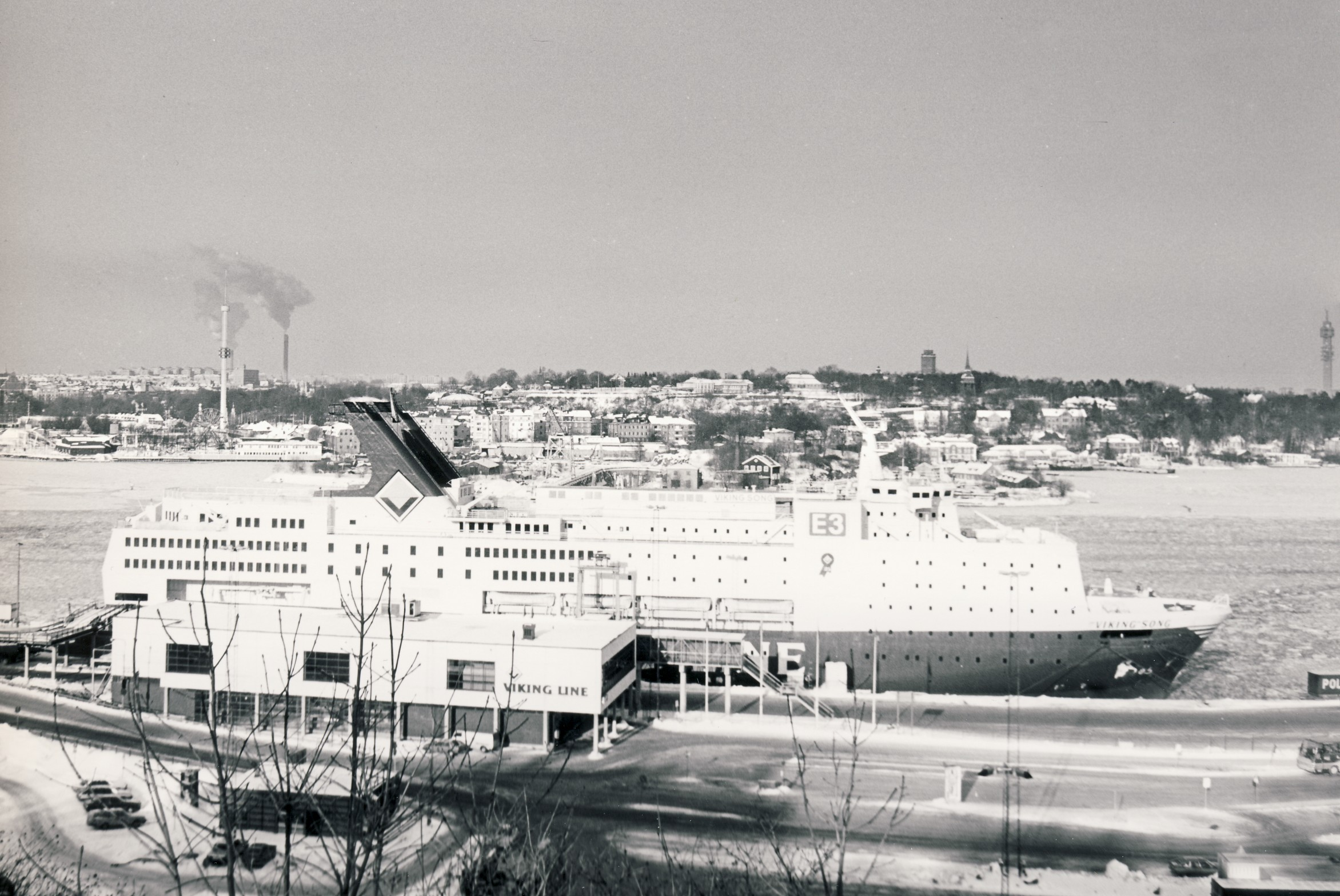
Viking Song in Stockholm, 1984

=== Viking Line and Fred. Olsen service ===
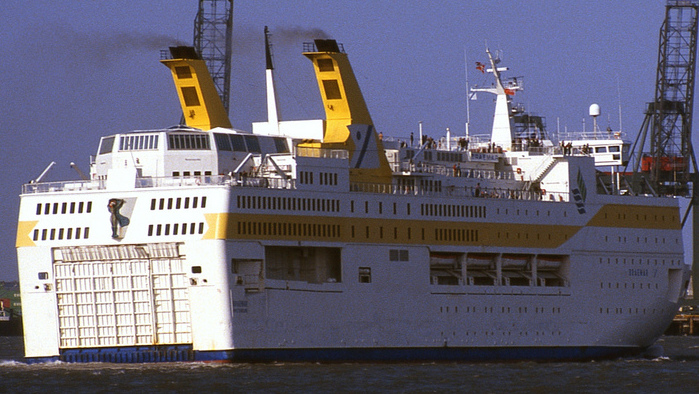
Braemar in 1986

Delivered in August 1980, Viking Song was the last newbuilding delivered to Rederi Ab Sally for use on Viking Line's routes. She served alongside her sister ship Viking Saga on the route connecting Helsinki, Finland to Stockholm. Although she was the newer of the two ships, when SF Line brought its new Mariella to the Helsinki to Stockholm service in 1985, the Viking Song was withdrawn from service and sold to Norwegian Fred. Olsen Lines.

After rebuilding at Blohm+Voss, Hamburg where a second storey was added to her nightclub, Viking Song emerged as Fred. Olsen's Braemar. She was initially set on a route connecting Oslo, Norway with Harwich, England, although her route varied a lot during the next five years, with Hirtshals, Denmark replacing or appearing alongside Harwich as the main destination. In December 1990 Fred. Olsen sold their ferry operations to the new Color Line, however Braemar was not included in the sale and she was laid up.

=== Russian Army and Baltic Line ===
In January 1991 Braemar was chartered to Baltic Shipping Company and renamed Baltica for planned service between St Petersburg, Russia and Stockholm. This service was never realised however, and for the time being the only change was moving the ship to Hamburg where she was again laid up. Later in the same month the ship was sub-chartered to the Russian army for transporting troops out of former East Germany. The ship, renamed Anna Karenina, was badly vandalised by the troops transported on board, and had to be docked in Hamburg afterwards for repairs.

March 1991 finally saw the beginning of a service out of St. Petersburg, when Anna Karenina started traffic on the St. Petersburg–Nynäshamn–Kiel route for Baltic Line. In 1995 St Petersburg was dropped from the itinerary. In January 1996 Baltic Line was declared bankrupt and Anna Karenina (soon renamed Anna K.) returned to Fred. Olsen for laying up in Germany.

=== EstLine and Tallink ===
Anna K. was sold to Estline, Sweden and ESCO, Estonia) in 1996 for service between Tallinn, Estonia and Stockholm, Sweden. She was renamed Regina Baltica. In 1997 Nordström & Thulin withdrew from Estline leaving ESCO as the sole owner of the company. ESCO later changed its name to Hansatee Shipping. At the end of 2000 the name Estline was abandoned and the Tallinn–Stockholm service became a part of Tallink. In May 2004 a call at Mariehamn was added to maintain tax-free sales on board.

In spring 2005 the ship was temporarily chartered to NATO for training exercises in Norway. On 28 September 2005 the ship ran aground in Swedish waters near Kapellskär. There were no victims in the accident, which happened on the day of the 11th anniversary of the sinking of the Estonia. In April 2006 Regina Baltica made three trips between Tallinn and Helsinki, due to the ice situation being so bad that all of Tallink's normal ships on the route could not traffic. On May of the same year Romantika replaced her on the Tallinn–Mariehamn–Stockholm route, and Regina Baltica was moved to Stockholm–Riga route, where she replaced Fantaasia. In August of the same year the Regina Baltica's homeport was changed from Tallinn to Riga.

=== Acciona Trasmediterránea ===
The Regina Baltica was withdrawn from service with Tallink in April 2009, when she was replaced by Romantika in the Stockholm–Riga service. Subsequently, she was chartered to the Spain-based Acciona Trasmediterránea and entered service their Almería–Nador route on 25 June 2009. On 20 September 2009 she was returned to Tallink and laid up in Riga. In the end of May 2010 Regina Baltica was again chartered to Acciona Trasmediterránea, serving first on their Algeciras–Tangier route and from June on the Almeria—Nador route. This charter will last until 3 September 2010.

=== Strandfaraskip Landsins ===
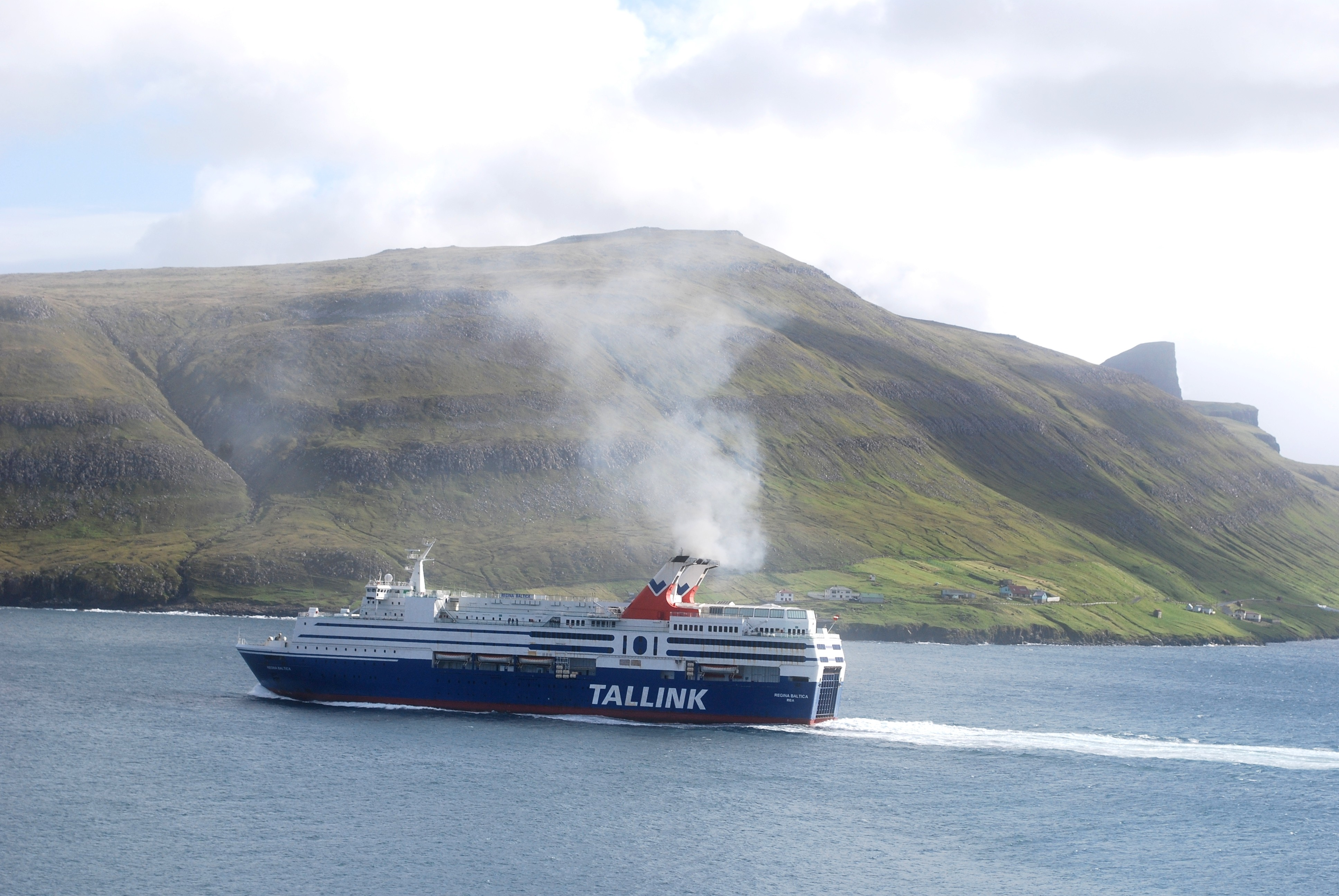
Regina Baltica en route from Vágur, Suðuroy to Tórshavn, in the Faroe Islands, on 17 September 2010

On 11 September 2010 Regina Baltica arrived in Vágur, Faroe Islands. She was chartered to Strandfaraskip Landsins for four weeks from 17 September onwards for use on the service linking Tórshavn to Tvøroyri in Suðuroy while the regular ferry on the route – the Smyril – undergoes a docking in Denmark. The first journey was from Vágur in Suðuroy, but the rest of the time Regina Baltica was embarking and disembarking from Krambatangi ferry port near Tvøroyri. The schedule had to be changed, because it takes longer time to embark with Regina Baltica, therefore the ferry can't sail 3 times daily from Tórshavn three times weekly like Smyril did, but two times daily every day. Smyril came back again on 15 October 2010, and went back on its route on the same day. Regina Baltica sailed for the last time from Tórshavn at 13:00 to Vágur. Smyril left from Krambatangi ferry port at 15:30 according to the planned schedule. Regina Baltica was lying at the port of Vágur for 6 days. The ferry left Vágur on 21 October 2010.

=== Acciona Trasmediterránea ===
From June to September in 2011 Regina Baltica sailed in the Mediterranean sea, on route Almeria (Spain) – Nador (Morocco).

=== Floating hotel ===
From February 2012 Regina Baltica served as a floating hotel in Sheringham, England. She arrived Harwich in the beginning of February.

From April 2013 Regina Baltica serves as a floating hotel for the BARD Offshore 1 windfarm, Germany.

April 2014 to 2017 she served as a floating hotel in Lerwick, Shetland. In 2017 she was bought by Balearia.
