= Reijo Hammar =

Reijo Juhani Hammar (now known as Andreas Hammar, born 1953) is a Finnish criminal. He has been called Finland's most dangerous prisoner.

On 10 July 1986 Hammar murdered Antti Johannes Eljaala, a 44-year-old businessman from Tampere, on board the ship Viking Sally on its voyage from Turku, Finland to Stockholm, Sweden. Near the end of the trip, Hammar and Eljaala had gone into Eljaala's cabin. According to the newspaper Iltalehti's report of the event, Hammar had stolen money from Eljaala's wallet and Eljaala had intended to report this to the police. As Eljaala was leaving the cabin, Hammar had struck him on the neck with a knife and strangled him with a piece of cloth he had torn from the bedcovers. An assistant of Hammar had also participated in the deed. Hammar received a life imprisonment sentence for murder.

In July 1988 Hammar escaped from the Turku Prison (known as "Kakola") with two other prisoners, Aaro Petteri Tenhunen and Martti Orajärvi. During the escape, Hammar shot a guard in the arm with a sawn-off shotgun. In Lapland the escapees got into an argument ending in Hammar killing Tenhunen by hitting him on the head with an axe. The escape ended in August 1988 when Hammar and Orajärvi got caught in Stockholm and were returned to Finland. During their escape the two prisoners made several bank robberies. The press dubbed Hammar "the escapee from Kakola".

President of Finland Tarja Halonen pardoned Hammar in December 2004. Hammar received media attention the next time on 24 February 2007 when he went to the pub Oluthuone in Vuosaari, Helsinki carrying a pistol and released his wife, who had caused a disturbance at the pub, from the grip of the bouncers. Hammar and his wife left the pub before the police arrived. Hammar was caught in the next evening from his car at a parking lot in Vuosaari. The police held Hammar and his wife until the next day when they were released. The district court of Helsinki sentenced Hammar to 360 day-fines in October 2007.

On 25 September 2011 Hammar stabbed his acquaintance at a private apartment in Helsinki because of a disagreement. The stabbed man managed to flee into another apartment, after which Hammar went to a nearby pub. The police caught Hammar at the pub and brought him to be interrogated. During the interrogation, Hammar could not produce a motive for his deed. On 7 December 2011 the Helsinki district court sentenced Hammar to four years in prison for attempted manslaughter and to pay compensation to the victim.
