= Estline =

Company based in Estonia

- Founded: 1989
- Defunct: August 2001
- Fate: Bankruptcy (2001)
- Headquarters: Tallinn, Estonia
- Area served: Baltic Sea
- Services: Passenger transportation Freight transportation
- Parent: Estonian Shipping Company
- Website: www.estline.ee

Estline (sometimes spelled EstLine) was a Swedish-Estonian shipping company, owned jointly by Nordström & Thulin and the Estonian Government via Estonian Shipping Company (ESCO). Estline was founded in 1989, and had a 10 year exclusive right to the passenger traffic between Stockholm, Sweden and Tallinn, Estonia. On 28 September 1994, the flagship of the company, MS Estonia, sank in an autumn storm. In 1998, Nordström & Thulin left the joint venture, making Estline a fully owned Estonian shipping company. By the end of 2000, Estline's ships were chartered by Tallink. Estline officially declared bankruptcy in August 2001.

== History ==
Estline was a shipping company facilitating passenger travel between Tallinn and Stockholm. It was established in 1989 and faced financial difficulties in 2001.

On August 28, 1989, the Transport Committee of the Estonian SSR and the Swedish shipping company Nordström & Thulin AB inked a comprehensive agreement to inaugurate cruise ferry services between Tallinn and Stockholm.

According to the agreement, Estline-Eesti AS, in partnership with the Swedish entity Nordström & Thulin Estline AB, was established in November 1989. A contract between the Port of Tallinn and Estline-Eesti AS was signed to construct the new terminal.

On June 16, 1990, the cruise ferry MS Nord Estonia, owned by Nordström & Thulin Estline AB, departed from Stockholm heading for Tallinn, arriving the following morning. On May 22, 1991, a new passenger terminal (B-terminal) opened at the Port of Tallinn, marking a European-style construction milestone before Estonia's restoration of independence.

Amid a Soviet military coup attempt in Moscow on August 19, 1991, with the Tallinn port blocked and military presence on Estonian roads, the Nord Estonia embarked for Tallinn. The port opened that night, and on the morning of August 20, 1991, Nord Estonia was the lone ship to arrive at the Tallinn port during that uncertain hour, as other vessels had halted in foreign ports.

In October 1992, Estonian Shipping Company (ESCO) began representing Estonia on the Tallinn-Stockholm shipping line. A new company, E-Liini AS, formed with equal ownership by ESCO and Nordström & Thulin AB. By the end of 1992, the Estonia-based enterprise was renamed E-Liini AS, with ESCO holding 50%. In February 1993, the cruise ferry MS Estonia replaced the Swedish-flagged Nord Estonia in service, jointly purchased by Estline's owners.

As a result of the sinking of the MS Estonia on September 28, 1994, the MS Mare Balticum underwent more extensive rebuilding than initially planned, and the company's logo was replaced. Sea traffic resumed on December 11, 1994. In the fall of 1997, following ESCO's privatization, the cruise ferry MS Baltic Kristina commenced limited service on the Tallinn-Stockholm line. Regular daily line traffic began on May 1, 1998, with the two ships.

In January 1998, ESCO acquired Nordström & Thulin's share, renaming E-Liini AS back to Estline. Nordström & Thulin exited the joint venture in 1998, making Estline a wholly owned Estonian shipping company. In December 2000, ESCO entered into a lease agreement with Tallink for both ships, and service resumed in January 2001. Estline, lacking vessels and income, declared bankruptcy in the summer of 2001.

== Ships ==
Not a complete list.

=== Former vessels ===
Ships that are still in use are marked in green.

Ship	Built	In service	Tonnage^{1}	Image	Notes
MS Nord Estonia	1974	1990–1994	10,002 GRT		Scrapped in Aliağa, Turkey, 2014.
MS Estonia	1980	1993–1994	15,598 GRT		Capsized and sank on 28 September 1994.
MS Mare Balticum	1979	1994–1996	11,671 GRT		Scrapped in Alang, India, 2021.
MS Nord Neptunus	1977	1995-1997	3,549 GRT		Scrapped in Aliağa, Turkey, 2007.
MS Regina Baltica	1980	1996–2000	13,878 GRT		Now sails for Balearia.
MS Baltic Kristina	1973	1997–2000	12,281 GRT		Scrapped in Alang.

=== Chartered vessels ===
Ships that are still in use are marked in green.

Ship	Built	In service	Tonnage^{1}	Image	Notes
MS Maersk Friesland	1981	1992-1993	4,476 GRT		Scrapped in Aliağa, Turkey, 2007.
MV Cap Canaille	1977	1994	5,726 GRT		Sunk as an artificial reef on 8 August 2024.
MS Donata	1971	1994	6,602 GRT		Scrapped in Aliağa, Turkey, 2000.
MV Bore Song	1977	1995	8,188 GRT		Scrapped in Aliağa, Turkey, 2011.
MV Cap Afrique	1977	1996	1,583 GRT		Scrapped in Aliağa, Turkey, 2007.
MS Parchim	1991	1996	9,953 GRT		Now sails for Sea-Cargo.
MS Bolero	1983	1997	10,243 GRT		Now sails for Alcatel Submarine Networks Marine.
MS Transest	1972	2000	2,386 GRT		Scrapped in Alang, India, 2006.
