= Reijo Linna =

Finnish former footballer (born 1963)

Personal information
- Date of birth: 28 March 1963 (age 63)
- Place of birth: Helsinki, Finland
- Height: 1.77 m (5 ft 10 in)
- Position: Midfielder

Youth career
- 1974–1980: KäPa
- 1981: HJK

Senior career*
Years	Team	Apps	(Gls)
1981–1990	HJK	109	(11)
1988	→ Kontu (loan)	4	(2)
1989	→ Jurong Town (loan)	12	(2)
1989	→ Jaro (loan)	26	(2)
1990	→ Geylang (loan)	12	(2)
1990–1998	FinnPa	204	(16)
- * Club domestic league appearances and goals

Reijo Linna (born 28 March 1963) is a Finnish former footballer who played as a midfielder. During his career, he played in his native Finland and Singapore. He won two Finnish championship titles and one Finnish Cup with HJK Helsinki, Singaporean FAS Premier League title with Geylang International and Singapore President's Cup with Jurong.

After his playing career, Linna has worked as a youth coach for his parent club Käpylän Pallo.

== Honours ==
HJK

- Mestaruussarja: 1985, 1987
- Finnish Cup: 1984

Geylang International

- FAS Premier League: 1990

Jurong Town

- Singapore President's Cup: 1989
