= MS Estonia =

Car-passenger ferry sunk in the Baltic Sea in 1994

Coordinates: 59°22.92′N 21°40.92′E

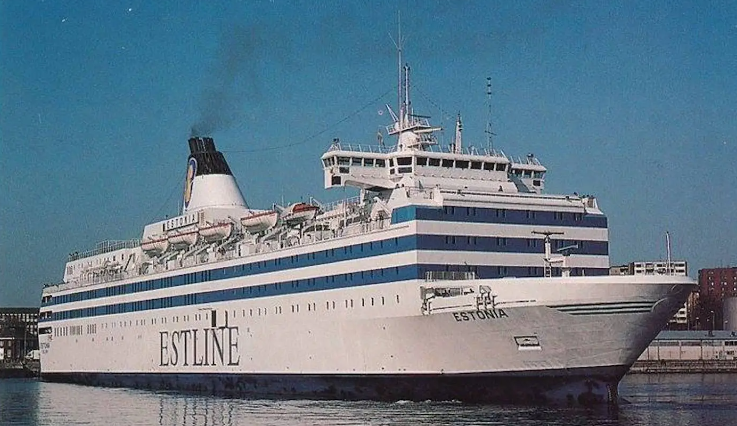
- MS Estonia in 1993/1994.

History
- Name: 1980–1990: Viking Sally; 1990–1991: Silja Star; 1991–1993: Wasa King; 1993–1994: Estonia
- Namesake: Estonia (as Estonia)
- Owner: 1980–1988: Rederi Ab Sally; 1988–1992: Effoa; 1992–1993: Effdo 3 Oy; 1993–1994: Estline Marine Co Ltd
- Operator: 1980–1987: Rederi Ab Sally (Viking Line traffic); 1987–1990: Rederi AB Slite (Viking Line traffic); 1990–1991: Silja Line; 1991–1993: Wasa Line; 1993–1994: Estline
- Port of registry: 1980–1991: Mariehamn, Finland; 1991–1993: Vaasa, Finland; 1993–1994: Tallinn, Estonia
- Ordered: 11 September 1979
- Builder: Meyer Werft, Papenburg, West Germany
- Yard number: 590
- Laid down: 18 October 1979
- Launched: 26 April 1980
- Completed: 27 April 1980
- Acquired: 29 June 1980
- In service: 5 July 1980
- Identification: Call sign: ESTE; IMO number: 7921033
- Fate: Capsized and sank on 28 September 1994

General characteristics
- Type: Car-Passenger Ferry
- Tonnage: 15,598 GT; 3,006 DWT
- Length: 155.43 m (509 ft 11 in) (as built); 157.02 m (515.16 ft) (1984 onwards)
- Beam: 24.21 m (79 ft 5 in)
- Draught: 5.60 m (18 ft 4 in)
- Decks: 9
- Ice class: 1 A
- Installed power: 4 × MAN 8L40/45; 17,625 kW (23,636 hp) (combined)
- Speed: 21.1 knots (39.1 km/h; 24.3 mph)
- Capacity: 2,000 passengers; 1,190 passenger berths; 460 cars

MS Estonia was a car-passenger ferry built in 1980 for the Finnish shipping company Rederi Ab Sally by Meyer Werft, in Papenburg, West Germany. She was deployed on ferry routes between Finland and Sweden by various companies (first Viking Line, then EffJohn) until the end of January 1993, when she was sold to Nordström & Thulin for use on Estline's Tallinn–Stockholm route. The ship's sinking on 28 September 1994, in the Baltic Sea between Sweden, Finland and Estonia, was one of the deadliest peacetime maritime disasters of the 20th century, claiming 852 lives. An official inquiry found that failure of the locks on the bow visor allowed water to flood the car deck and quickly capsize the ship. The report also noted a lack of crew action. A 2023 investigation noted additional construction flaws in the bow visor.

== Construction ==
The ship was originally ordered from the Meyer Werft shipyard in Papenburg, West Germany, by a Norwegian shipping company led by Parley Augustsen with intended traffic between Norway and Germany. At the last moment, the company withdrew their order and the contract went to Rederi Ab Sally, one of the partners in the Viking Line consortium (SF Line, another partner in Viking Line, had also been interested in the ship).

Originally the ship was conceived as a sister ship to Diana II, built in 1979 by the same shipyard for Rederi AB Slite, the third partner in Viking Line. When Sally took over the construction contract, the ship was lengthened from the original length of approximately 137 metres (449 ft) to approximately 155 metres (509 ft) and the superstructure of the ship was largely redesigned.

Viking Line received a total of four new ships in 1980 alone, three of which were built for Rederi AB Sally. In addition to the Viking Sally, the Viking Saga and her sister ship Viking Song also entered service in 1980, having been built by Wärtsilä (now Aker Finnyards) in Turku, Finland.

Meyer Werft had constructed a large number of ships for various Viking Line partner companies during the 1970s. The construction of the ship's bow consisted of an upwards-opening visor and a car ramp that was placed inside the visor when it was closed. An identical bow construction had also been used in Diana II.

== Service history ==
Estonia previously sailed as Viking Sally (1980–1990), Silja Star (1990–1991), and Wasa King (1991–1993).

=== Viking Line ===
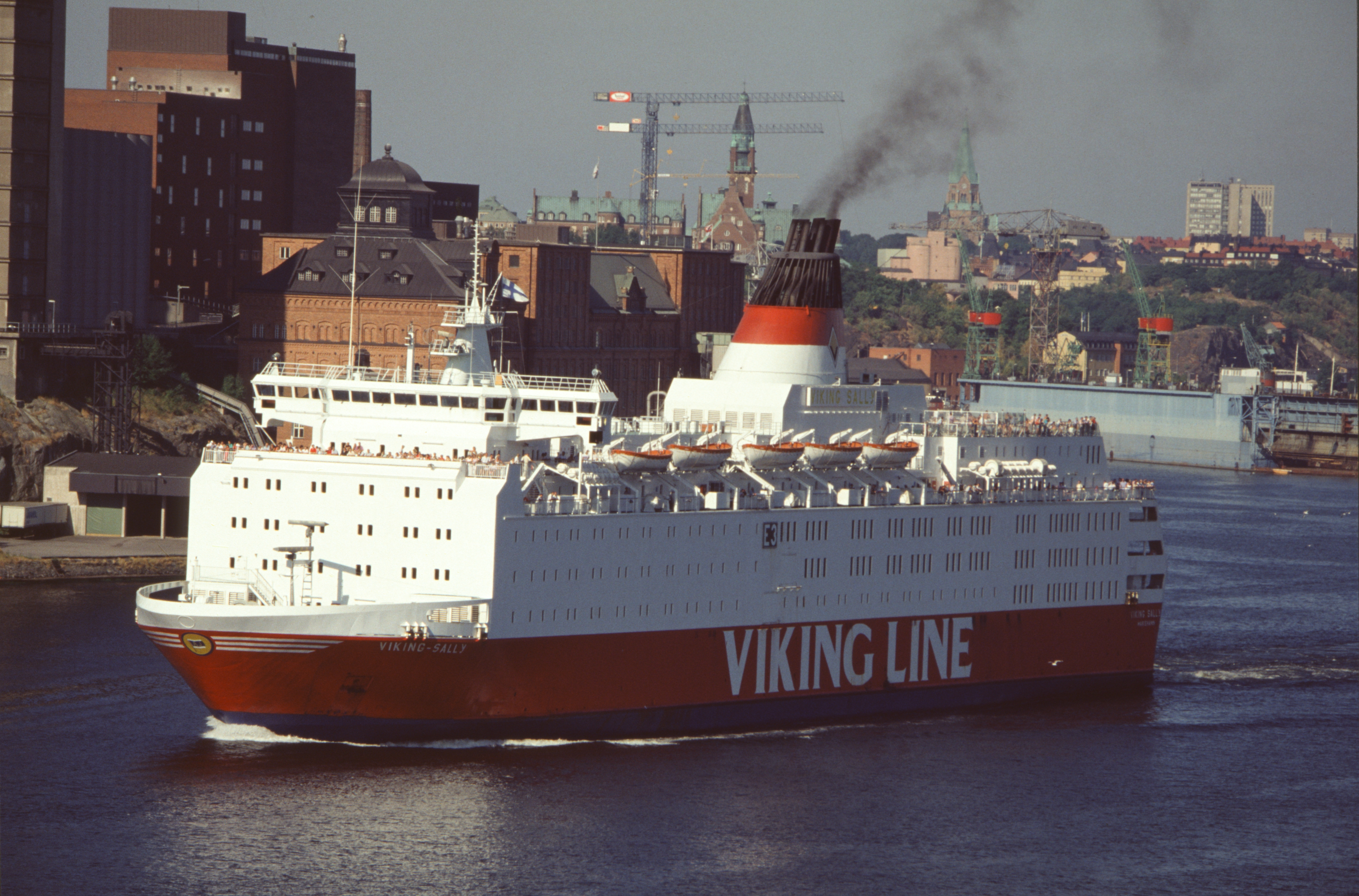
As Viking Sally at Stockholm

On 29 June 1980, Viking Sally was delivered to Rederi Ab Sally, Finland and was put into service on the route between Turku, Mariehamn and Stockholm (during summer 1982 on the Naantali–Mariehamn–Kapellskär route). She was the largest ship to serve on that route at the time. As with many ships, Viking Sally suffered some mishaps during her Viking Line service, being grounded in the Åland Archipelago in May 1984 and suffering some propeller problems in April of the following year. In 1985 she was also rebuilt with a "duck tail". In 1986, a passenger was murdered on board. In 1987, another murder and attempted murder took place. The latter remains unsolved. Rederi Ab Sally had been experiencing financial difficulties for most of the 1980s. In late 1987, Effoa and Johnson Line, the owners of Viking Line's main rivals Silja Line, bought Sally. As a result of this, SF Line and Rederi AB Slite forced Sally to withdraw from Viking Line. Viking Sally was chartered to Rederi AB Slite to continue on her current traffic for the next three years.

=== Silja Line ===
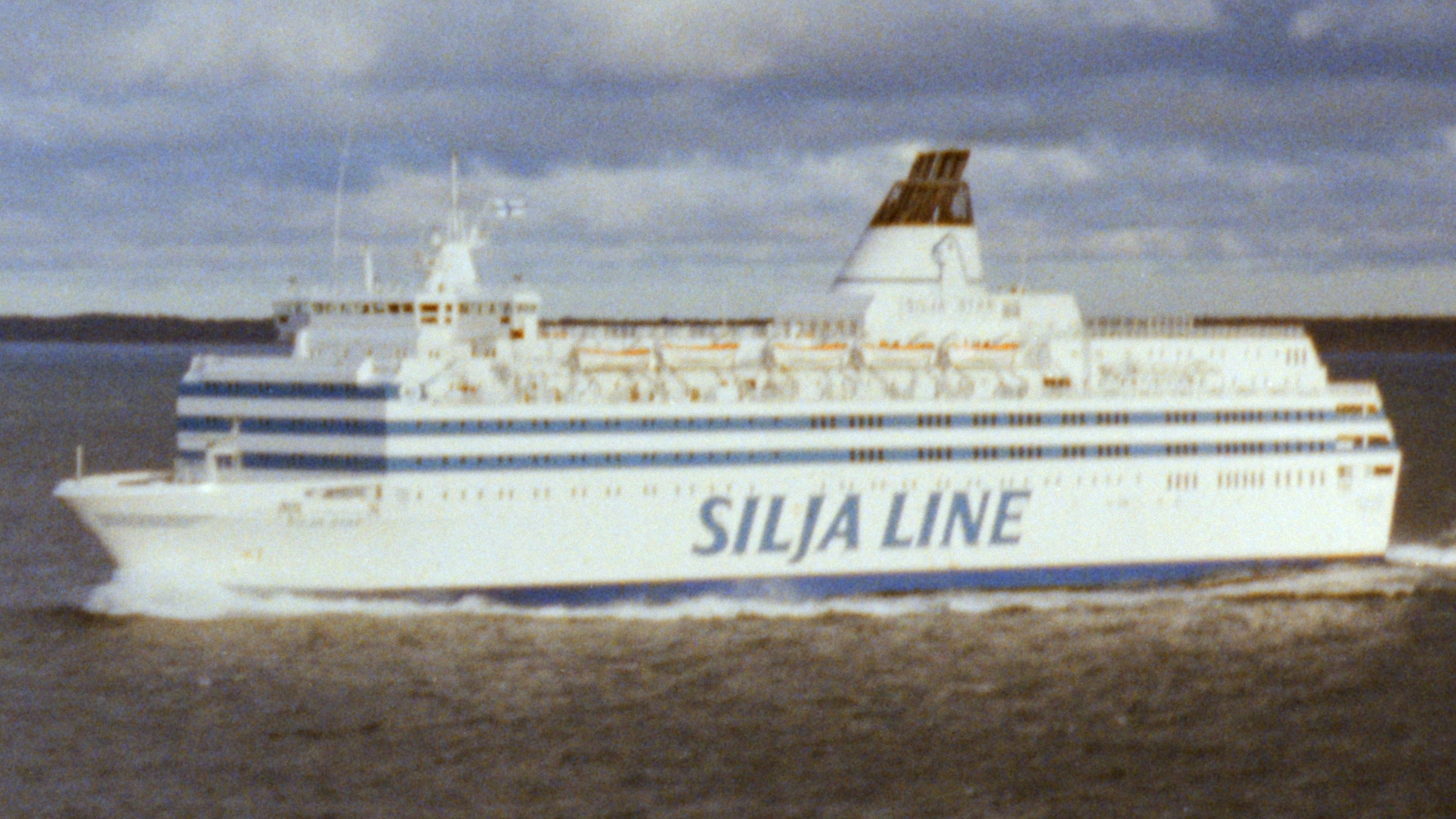
As Silja Star in 1991

When her charter ended in April 1990, Viking Sally had an unusual change of service. She was painted in Silja Line's colours, renamed Silja Star and placed on the same route that she had plied for Viking Line: Turku–Mariehamn–Stockholm. The reason for this was that Silja's new ship for Helsinki–Stockholm service was built behind schedule and one of the Turku–Stockholm ships, Wellamo, was transferred to that route until the new ship was complete in November 1990. Also in 1990 Effoa, Johnson Line and Rederi Ab Sally merged into EffJohn.

The following spring Silja Star began her service with Wasa Line, another company owned by EffJohn. Her name was changed to Wasa King and she served on routes connecting Vaasa, Finland, to Umeå and Sundsvall in Sweden. It has been reported that the Wasa King was widely considered to be the best behaving ship in rough weather to have sailed from Vaasa.

=== Estline ===
In January 1993, at the same time when EffJohn decided to merge Wasa Line's operations into Silja Line, Wasa King was sold to Nordström & Thulin for use on Estline's Tallinn–Stockholm traffic under the name Estonia. The actual ownership of the ship was rather complex, in order for Nordström & Thulin to get a loan to buy the ship. Although Nordström & Thulin was the company which bought the ship, her registered owner was Estline Marine Co Ltd, Nicosia, Cyprus, which chartered the ship to E.Liini A/S, Tallinn, Estonia (daughter company of Nordström & Thulin and ESCO), which in turn chartered the ship to Estline AB. As a result, the ship was actually registered in both Cyprus and Estonia.

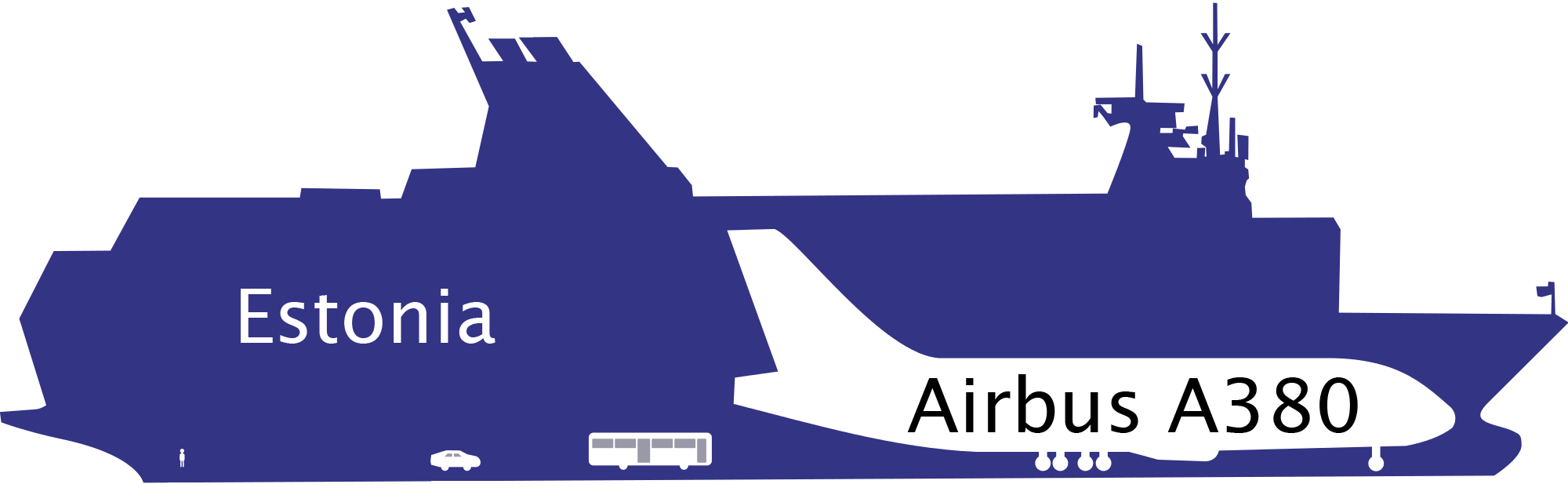
Size comparison between MS Estonia, a human, a car, a bus, and an Airbus A380

As the largest Estonian-owned ship of the time, the Estonia symbolized the independence that her namesake regained after the collapse of the Soviet Union.

== Decks and facilities ==
MS Estonia consisted of 11 decks, counting from the lowest (0) to the highest (10). Passenger facilities were located on decks 6, 5, 4, and 1, while the crew members occupied decks 8 and 7. Decks 2 and 3 were dedicated to cargo.

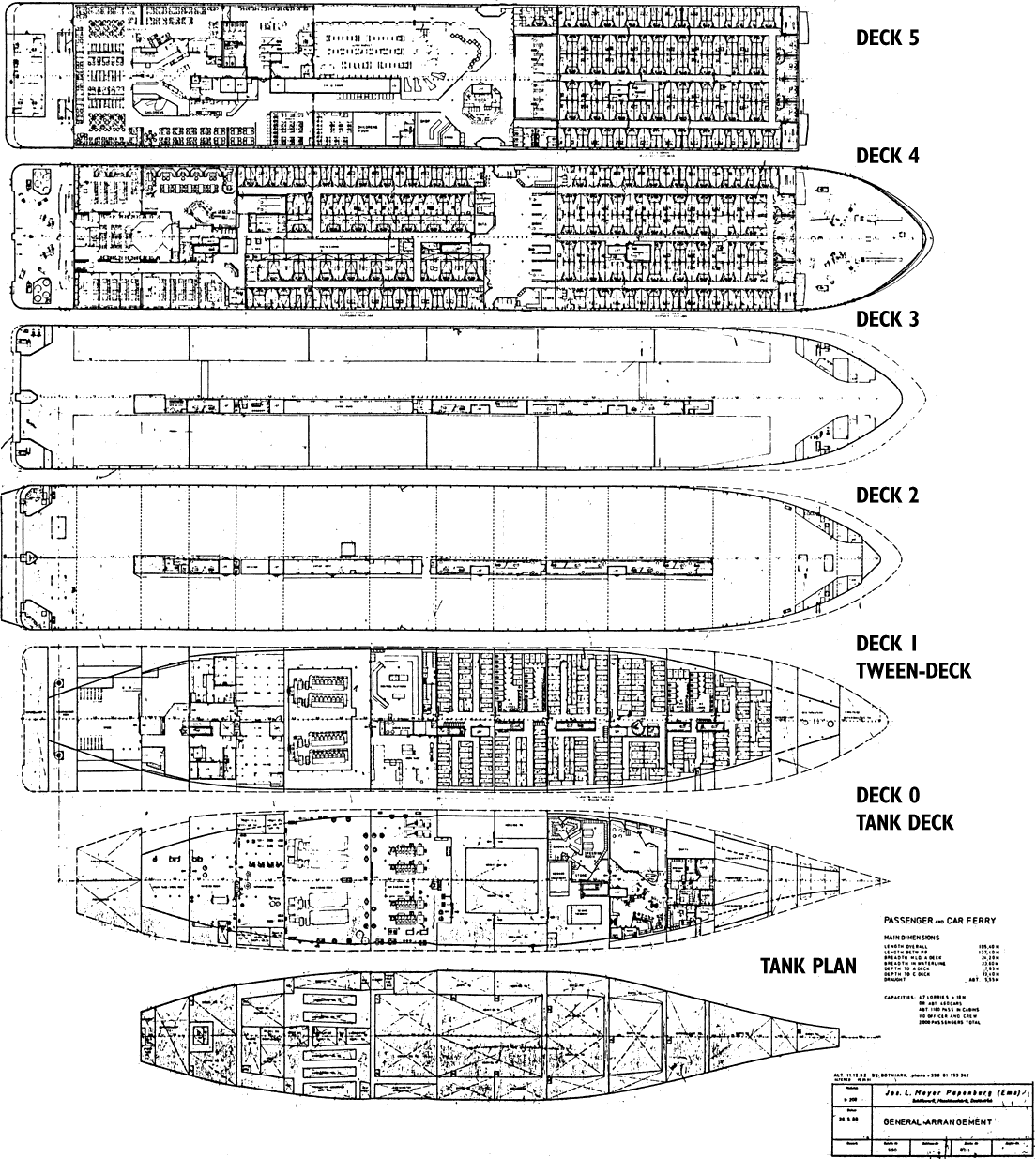
Plans of the decks 0 to 5, as the tank deck

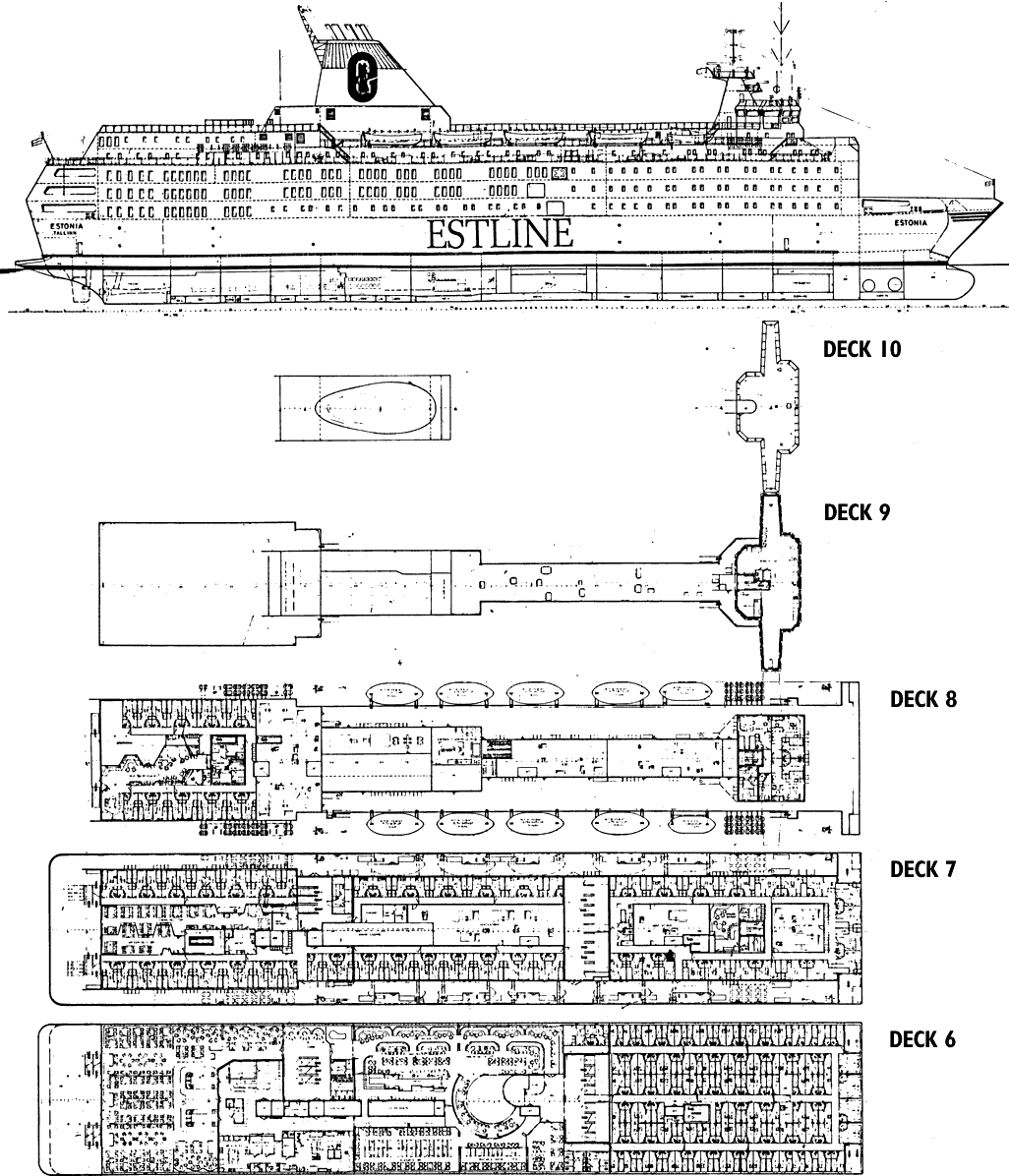
Plans of the decks 6 to 10

Deck 1 had the inexpensive staterooms, while other staterooms were on decks 4 through 6. The sauna and pool were on deck 0. Decks 4 through 6 had dining and entertainment facilities, with Deck 5 having the Pub Admiral and Deck 6 having the Baltic Bar.

=== As Viking Sally ===
9	Bridge, sundeck
8	Crew cabins, sundeck
7	Crew cabins & facilities, sundeck
6	Restaurant deck – Buffet dining room, à la carte restaurant, bar, outside and inside cabins
5	Entrance & cafeteria deck – Tax-free shops, cafeteria, snack bar, discotheque, air seats, children's playroom, outside and inside cabins
4	Conference deck – Conference rooms, nightclub, cinema, inside and outside cabins
3	Car platform
2	Car deck
1	Inside cabins, engine room
0	Sauna, swimming pool, conference rooms

== Sinking ==
Nationalities	Deaths	Survivors	Total
Sweden	501	51	552
Estonia	285	62	347
Latvia	23	6	29
Russia	11	4	15
Finland	10	3	13
Norway	6	3	9
Germany	5	3	8
Denmark	5	1	6
Lithuania	3	1	4
Morocco	2	0	2
Netherlands	1	1	2
Ukraine	1	1	2
United Kingdom	1	1	2
Belarus	1	0	1
Canada	1	0	1
France	1	0	1
Nigeria	1	0	1
Total	852	137	989

Estonia sank on Wednesday, 28 September 1994, between about 00:50 and 01:50 (UTC+2) as the ship was crossing the Baltic Sea, en route from Tallinn, Estonia, to Stockholm, Sweden.

The official report concluded that the bow door had separated from the vessel, pulling the ramp ajar. The ship was already listing because of poor cargo distribution, and the list increased rapidly due to the free surface effect, flooding the decks and the cabins. Power soon failed altogether, inhibiting search and rescue, and a full-scale emergency was not declared for 90 minutes. Of the 989 on board, 137 were rescued. The report criticised the passive attitude of the crew, failing to notice that water was entering the vehicle deck, delaying the alarm, and providing minimal guidance from the bridge. A further investigation found that the certificate of seaworthiness was incorrect since no inspection of the bow parts was done as per regulations, otherwise this would have led to the discovery of the flaws in the visor. The bow visor was under-designed before construction, as the ship's manufacturing and approval processes did not consider the visor and its attachments as critical items regarding ship safety.

The sinking was one of the deadliest maritime disasters of the 20th century. It is one of the deadliest peacetime sinkings of a European ship, after the RMS Titanic (1912) and the RMS Empress of Ireland (1914), and the deadliest peacetime shipwreck to have occurred in European waters, with 852 lives lost. There are memorials for the event in Tallinn and Stockholm.

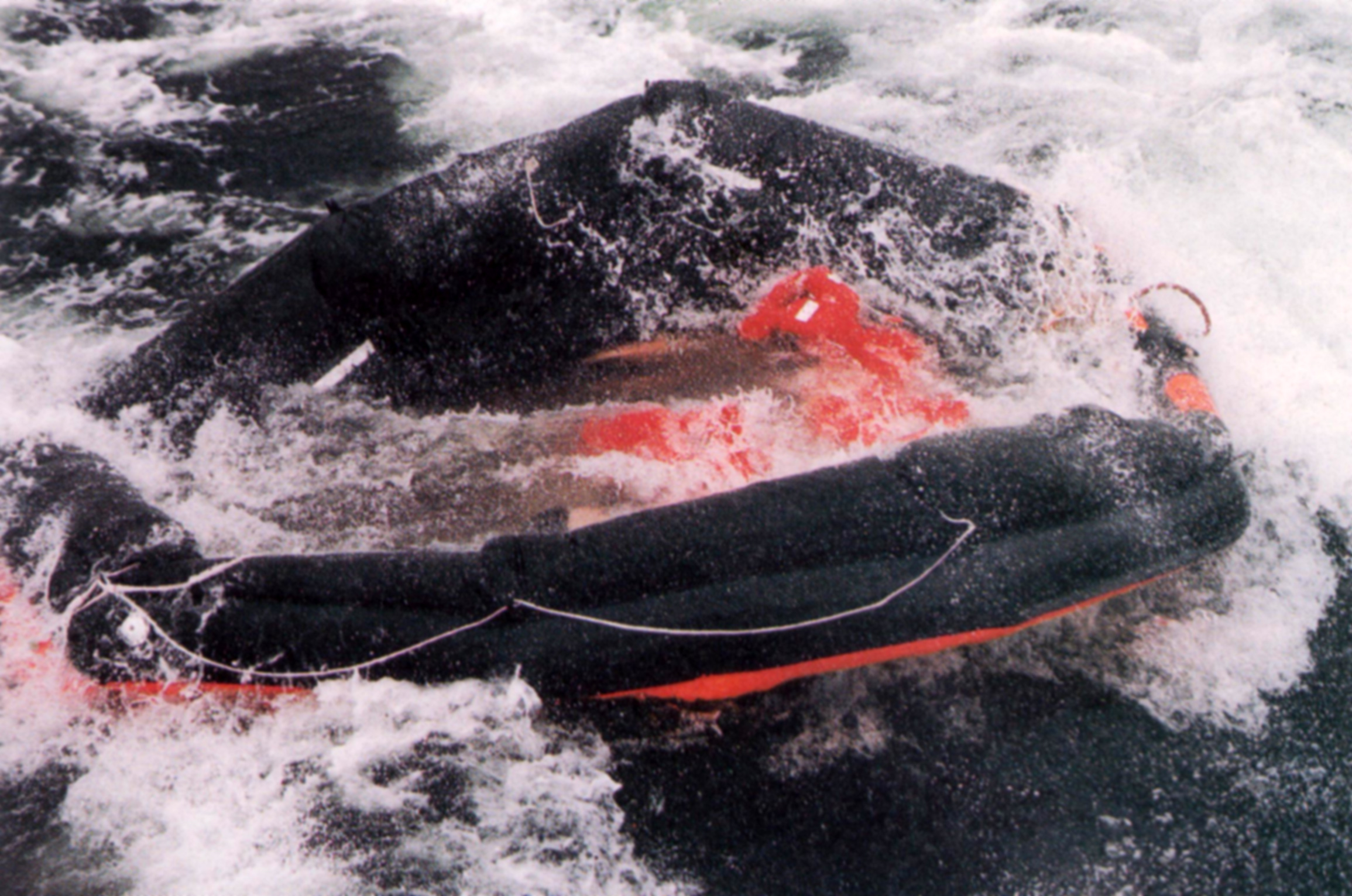
One of Estonia's inflatable life rafts, filled with water

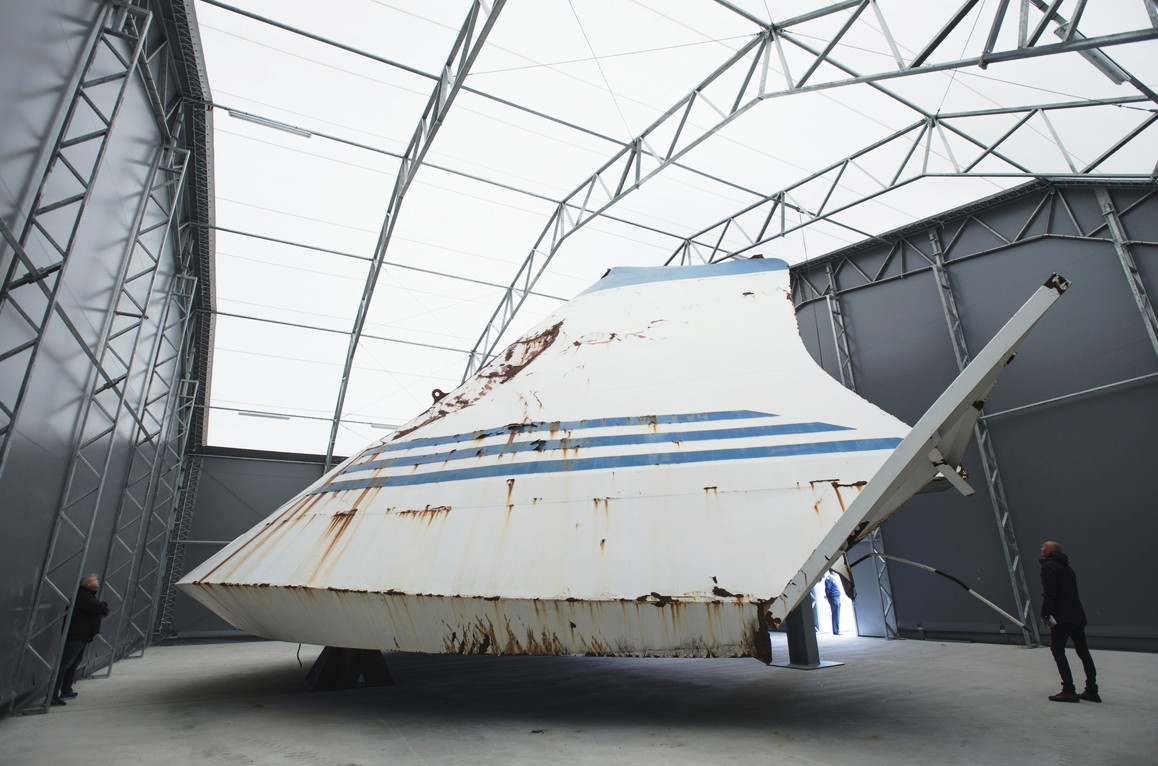
Estonia's bow visor

== See also ==
- List of RORO vessel accidents
- List of accidents and disasters by death toll
- List of shipwrecks in 1994
- Estonia (TV series), 2023 Finnish television series about the sinking of the ferry
