= Jaume I =

Jaume I (Catalan for "James I") may refer to:

- James I of Aragon, king from 1213 to 1276
- James I of Urgell, count from 1327 to 1347
- HSC Jaume I, a Spanish high-speed ferry
