= Förde Reederei Seetouristik =

German maritime transportation company

- Industry: Transport
- Founded: 1990
- Headquarters: Flensburg, Germany
- Area served: Strait of Gibraltar; Baltic Sea; North Sea; Elbe; Salish Sea
- Key people: Götz Becker; Jan Kruse; Christian Baumberger
- Services: Passenger transportation Freight transportation
- Website: frs.world

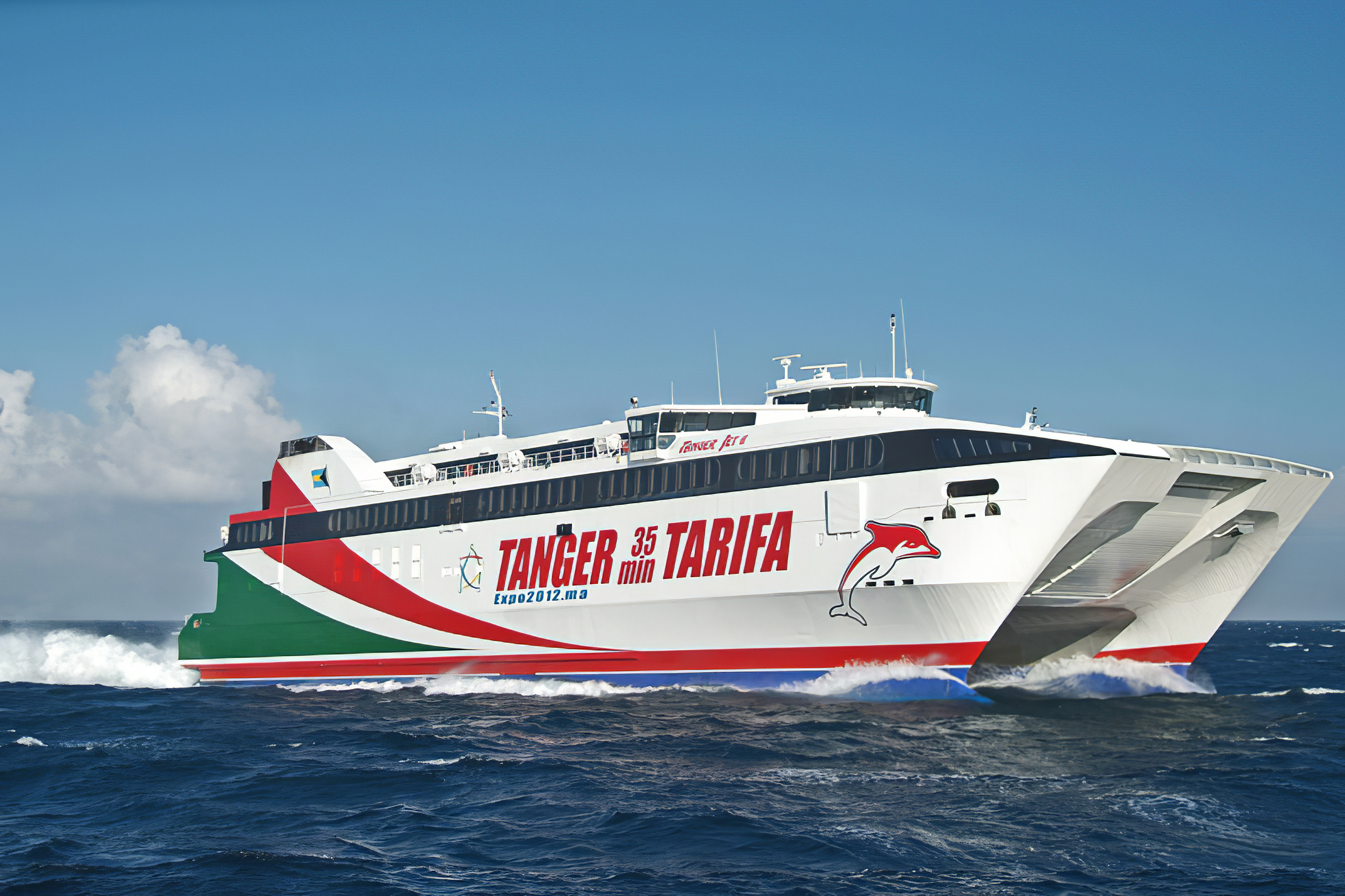
Tanger Jet II

FRS GmbH & Co KG (formerly Förde Reederei Seetouristik, also operating internationally as Fast Reliable Seaways), commonly known as FRS, is a German transportation company specializing in passenger ferry and freight transportation. It originally started as a regional passenger ferry operator founded in 1866. Since then, it has expanded in recent years to an international business group and became one of Europe's leading ferry operators. FRS provides conventional ferries, as well as high speed ferries. With 70 vessels and approximately 2,000 employees worldwide, FRS transports 7.9 million passengers and 2.1 million vehicles per year. The company group has its headquarters in Northern Germany, Flensburg and comprises 17 subsidiaries located in Europe, North Africa, Middle East and North America. Focusing on national and international ferry and catamaran operations, FRS also specializes in Offshore Logistics, Port Management, Crewing and Maritime Consulting.

== Subsidiaries ==
=== Ferry operators ===
- ÆrøXpressen, connecting the island of Ærø to the Danish mainland
- Clipper Navigation, Inc., of Seattle, Washington, acquired in 2016
- FRS Helgoline, serving Heligoland and the lower Elbe
- FRS Syltfähre, connecting the German island of Sylt and the Danish island of Rømø
- National Ferries Company, operating in Oman
- Reederei Hiddensee, a subsidiary of Weiße Flotte, serving the island of Hiddensee
- Weiße Flotte, with service in the Baltic Sea, as well as electric ferries for passengers in Berlin and Wolfsburg

=== Other services ===
- Albanian Ferry Terminal Operator, managing ports on the Adriatic Sea
- FRS Iberia/Maroc, operating in the Strait of Gibraltar, Canary Islands and Balearic Islands (sold to DFDS in September 2023).
- FRS Offshore, an operator of offshore service vessels along the north coast of Germany
- FRS Windcat Offshore Logistics, a joint venture with Windcat Workboats
- FRS Ship Management, providing crewing and software

== Fleet ==
=== Fast Ferries (vehicle and passenger) ===
- HSC Ceuta Jet, operated by FRS Iberia S.L. (since 1998)
- HSC Algeciras Jet, operated by FRS Iberia S.L. (since 1999)
- HSC Tarifa Jet, operated by FRS Iberia S.L. (since 2006)
- HSC Hormuz, operated by FRS Management (since 2008)
- MS Jawharat Masirah, operated by FRS Management (since 2013)
- MS Shannah, operated by FRS Management (since 2013)
- HSC Al Hallaniyat, operated by FRS Management (since 2013)
- HSC Sawqrah, operated by FRS Management (since 2013)
- HSC Masirah 4, operated by FRS Management (since 2013)

=== Fast Ferries (passengers only) ===
- Taxiboot Pirat, operated by Reederei Hiddensee GmbH (since 1993)
- Taxiboot Störtebeker, operated by Reederei Hiddensee GmbH (since 1993)
- HSC San Gwann, operated by FRS-Fast Reliable Seaways, LLC (since 2016)
- HSC MV Victoria Clipper V, operated by Clipper Navigation, Inc. (since 2018), prior HSC
- HSC MV San Juan Clipper, operated by Clipper Navigation, Inc. (1990-2025), prior HSC
- HSC MV Emerald Clipper, operated by Clipper Navigation, Inc. (since 2026)
- HSC Halunder Jet, operated by FRS Helgoline GmbH & Co. KG (2003–2017)
- HSC Newbuild, operated by FRS Helgoline GmbH & Co. KG (since 2018)

=== Combi-Ferries / Ro-Pax-Ferries ===
- MS Tanger Express, operated by FRS Iberia S.L. (since 2003, modernized in 2015)
- MS Kattegat, operated by FRS Iberia S.L. (since 2013, modernized 2015)
- MS Al Andalus Express, operated by FRS Iberia S.L. (since 2016)
- MS Miramar Express, operated by FRS Iberia S.L. (since 2016)

=== Conventional passenger ferries ===
- MS Gellen, operated by Reederei Hiddensee GmbH (since 1993)
- MS Schaprode, operated by Reederei Hiddensee GmbH (since 1993)
- MS Insel Hiddensee, operated by Reederei Hiddensee GmbH (since 1995)
- MS Altefähr, operated by Weiße Flotte GmbH (since 1996)
- MS Hansestadt Stralsund, operated by Reederei Hiddensee GmbH (since 1996)
- MS Bültenkieker, operated by Weiße Flote GmbH (since 1996)
- MS Hanseblick, operated by Weiße Flotte GmbH (since 2009)
- Wappen von Breege, operated by Weiße Flotte GmbH (since 2016)
- MS Kleine Freiheit, operated by FRS HanseFerry (since 2017), prior Seebad Juliusruh, operated by Weiße Flotte GmbH (since 2016)
- MS Sundevit, operated by Reederei Hiddensee GmbH (since 1992)
- MS Alfagen, operated by FRS Management (since 2015)
- MS Knipan, operated by FRS Management (since 2015)
- MS Viggen, operated by FRS Management (since 2015)
- MS Ejdern, operated by FRS Management (since 2015)
- MS Gudingen, operated by FRS Management (since 2015)
- MS Skiftet, operated by FRS Management (since 2015)

=== Double-ended car ferries ===
- MF RömöExpress|MS RömöExpress (2019–present)
- MF SyltExpress|MS SyltExpress (2005–present)
- MF Vitte (1992–present)
- MF Stahlbrode (1994–present)
- MF Glewitz (1994–present)
- MF Warnow (1995–present)
- MF Breitling (1995–present)
- MF Wittow (1996–present)
- MF Stralsund (1995–present)
- Nordic Duck

=== Solar Ferries ===
- SF Fährbär 1, operated by Weiße Flotte GmbH, used in Berlin (since 2014)
- SF Fährbär 2, operated by Weiße Flotte GmbH, used in Berlin (since 2014)
- SF Fährbär 3, operated by Weiße Flotte GmbH, used in Berlin (since 2014)
- SF Fährbär 4, operated by Weiße Flotte GmbH, used in Berlin (since 2014)
- SF Sünje, operated by Weiße Flotte GmbH, used in Wolfsburg (since 2015)
- SF Aluna, operated by Norddeutsche Binnenreederei GmbH (since 2017/2018)

=== Crew Transfer Vessels (CTV) ===
- CTV Windcat 28, operated by FRS Windcat Offshore Logistics (FWOL), used for Offshore-Windparks in the German Baltic Sea (since 2012)
- CTV Windcat 34, operated by FWOL, used in the German Baltic Sea (since 2014)
- CTV Windcat 35, operated by FWOL, used in the German Baltic Sea (since 2014)
- CTV Windcat 40, operated by FWOL, used in the German Baltic Sea (since 2016)

=== Taxiboats ===
- MY Störtebeker, operated by Reederei Hiddensee GmbH (since 1993)
- MY Pirat, operated by Reederei Hiddensee GmbH (since 1993)

=== Icebreaker ===
- Swanti, operated by Weiße Flotte GmbH

=== Hovercraft-Boat ===
- Nordic Jet, operated by Nordic Jetline

=== Rowing boat ===
- Paule III, operated by Weiße Flotte GmbH (since 2015)

=== Fleet of operated vessels ===
- MS Atlantis (2005–2014; chartered)
- HSC Tanger Jet, later Dolphin Jet (2001–2011)
- HSC Thundercat 1 (2004–2008)
- MS Kloar Kimming (2007; chartered)
- HSC Hanse Jet (1996–2004)
- HSC Baltic Jet (1997–2004)
- HSC Flying Viking (2002–2003)
- HSC Cat No. 1 (1999–2006)
- MS Wappen von Hamburg (1983–2005)
- MS Helgoland (2004–2005)
- MS Wilhemlshaven (2004–2005)
- MF Vikingland (1979–2007)
- MF Westerland (1979–2006)
- MS Baltic Star (1975–2000)
- MS Dania (1980–2001)
- MS Ostsee (1969–1986)
- MS Ostsee (1990–1998)
- MS Nordsee I (1975–1998)
- MS Poseidon (1977–2002)
- MS Wappen von Flensburg (1992–1999)
- MS Seemöwe (1993–2003)
- MS Seemöwe II (1975–2003)
- MS Mommark (1969–2003)
- MS Fritz Reuter (1990–1999)
- MS Mecklenburg (1992–1999)
- MS Fehmarn I (1975–1999)
- MS Viking (1968–1999)
- MS Kollund (1966–1998)
- MS Glücksburg (1959–1998)
- MS Afrodite (1970–1998)
- MS Jürgensby (1968–1998)
- MS Baltica I / Habicht II (1977–1995)
- MS Mürwik (1937–1945)
- MS Mürwik (1959–1990)
- MS Wappen von Heiligenhafen (1981–1988)
- MS Stadt Flensburg (1971–1987)
- MS Meierwik (1963–1987)
- MS Reiher II (1979–1986)
- MS Albatros (1935–1971)
- MS Albatros (1977–1986)
- MS Alexandra (1935–1986)
- MS Moby Dick / Moby Dick I (1970–1985)
- MS Forelle (1935–1984)
- MS Danica (1980–1983)
- MS Langballigau (1965–1977)
- MS Libelle (1935–1976)
- MS Habicht (1935–1957)

== Routes ==
| Route | Vessel(s) | Description |
|---|---|---|
| Havneby (Danmark)–Sylt (Germany) | MF SyltExpress | year-round service |
| Tallinn (Estonia)–Helsinki, (Finland) | HSC Baltic Jet, HSC Nordic Jet | year-round service (no traffic during ice period) |
| Hamburg, Wedel, Cuxhaven–Heligoland | HSC Halunder Jet (2003-2017) | summer season (March - October) |
| Stralsund, Schaprode, Zingst, Wiek–Hiddensee | MS Hansestadt Stralsund, MS Insel Hiddensee, MS Schaprode, MS Gellen | year-round service |
| Taxiboat traffic around the Island Hiddensee (Germany) | Taxiboat Störtebeker, Taxiboat Pirat | support traffic on demand |
| Port round-trips for Tourists (sightseeing) in Stralsund | MS Altefähr | during the summer time |
| Warnemünde (Germany)–Hohe Düne (Germany) | MF Breitling, MF Warnow | year-round service |
| Wittow Ferry: Wittow North (Germany)–Wittow South (Germany) | MF Wittow | year-round service |
| Stahlbrode (Germany)–Glewitz (Germany) | MF Stahlbrode, MF Glewitz | summer season (April - October) |
| Schaprode – Vitte | MF Vitte | year-round service |
| Port round-trips in Stralsund | MS Hanseblick | year-round service |
| Sassnitz-Mukran – Trelleborg, Sweden | HSC Skane Jet summer season (March - October) | |
| Turku Archipelago / Lake Saimaa, Finland | MS Vikare and Nestori | year-round service |
| Turku Archipelago, Finland | MS Nordic Duck | year-round service |
| Pargas Route, Finland | Hovercraft Nordic Jet | winter season |
| Algeciras, Spain – Tanger-Med, Morocco | MF Tanger Express | year-round service |
| Tarifa, Spain – Tanger, Morocco | HSC Tarifa Jet | year-round service |
| Algeciras, Spain – Ceuta, Spain (enclave in Morocco) | HSC Ceuta Jet | year-round service |
| Gibraltar – Tanger Med, Morocco | MF Kattegat | year-round service |
| Motril, Spain – Tanger Med, Morocco | Al Andalus Express | year-round service |
| Alcudia, Spain – Ciutadella, Spain | Tarifa Jet | year-round service |
| Ibiza, Spain – Formentera, Spain | San Gwann | year-round service |
| Muscat – Khasab | HSC Jawharat Masirah and Shannah | year-round service |
| Muscat – Khasab | HSC Hormuz and Shinas | year-round service |
| Muscat – Khasab | HSC Al Hallaniyat, Sawqrah and Masirah 4 | year-round service |
| Seattle, Washington, United States – Victoria, BC, Canada | HSC MV Victoria Clipper V, and HSC MV San Juan Clipper | year-round service |
| Victoria, BC, Canada – Vancouver, BC, Canada | HSC MV Victoria Clipper V | year-round service |
| Miami, USA – Bimini, Bahamas | HSC San Gwann | year-round service (discontinued 2019) |
