= Baleària =

Spanish passenger ferry company

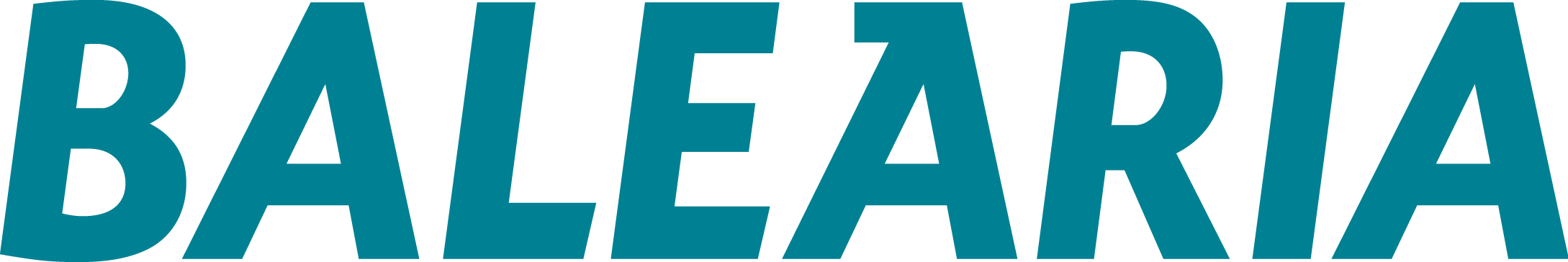
- Type: Private
- Industry: Shipping, transportation
- Founded: June 1998; 28 years ago
- Headquarters: Dénia, Alicante, Spain
- Area served: Balearic Islands, Canary Islands, Spain, Morocco, Grand Bahama, Florida (USA)
- Key people: Adolfo Utor, CEO
- Services: Passenger transportation, Freight transportation
- Revenue: 652,000,000 euro (2023)
- Number of employees: ▲2,500 (2023)
- Parent: Baleària Eurolíneas Marítimas S.A.
- Website: www.balearia.com

Baleària is the trading name of the Spanish shipping company Baleària Eurolíneas Marítimas S.A. The company operates passenger ferry services in the Mediterranean and Caribbean.

== History ==
In August 2025, Baleària reached an agreement with Naviera Armas to take over its and Trasmediterranea's operations in the Canary Islands and the Alboran Sea, as well as some across the Strait of Gibraltar. The company would receive control of 15 ferries, several routes, and staff. This was subject to approval from the National Commission on Markets and Competition (CNMC) of Spain.

In March 2026, the CNMC approved the deal, but highlighted competition risks in the Canary Islands. Baleària was forced to both end a joint ownership agreement with Fred Olsen Express for the route between Huelva and the Canary Islands and reopen the route between Morro Jable and Las Palmas.

In May 2026, Baleària took over the operations in the Canary Islands under the Baleària Canarias brand.

== Routes ==
In the Mediterranean region, Baleària provides domestic ferry services within Spain to the Balearic Islands from the ports of Dénia, Valencia and Barcelona. The company also operates international services across the Strait of Gibraltar, connecting Algeciras with Ceuta and Tangier.

In North America, Baleària operates regular international ferry services between Fort Lauderdale, Florida, United States, Freeport, Grand Bahama Island, and Bimini in the Bahamas. The company operates in the U.S. under the name Baleària Caribbean.

== Fleet ==
=== Current vessels ===
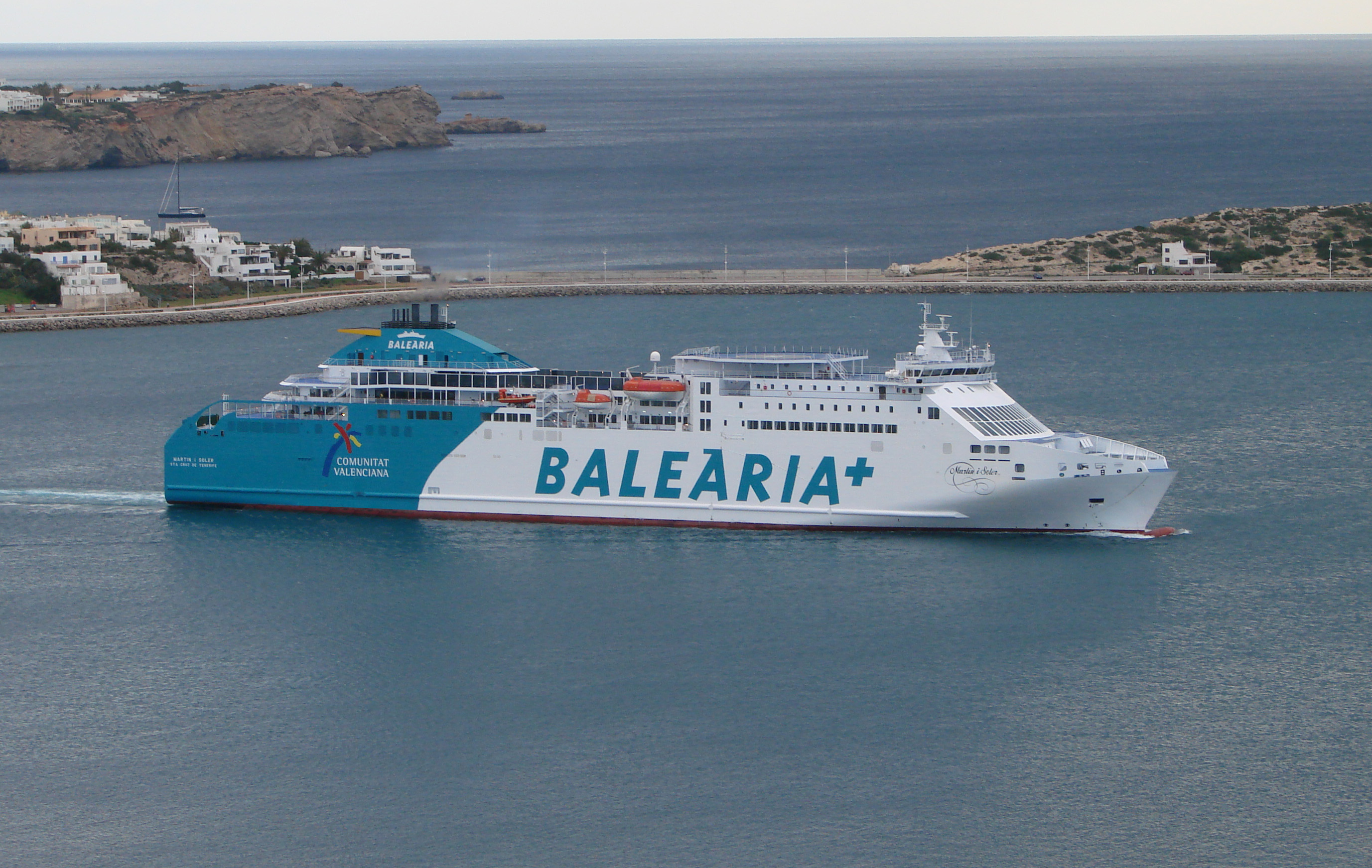
Martin i Soler

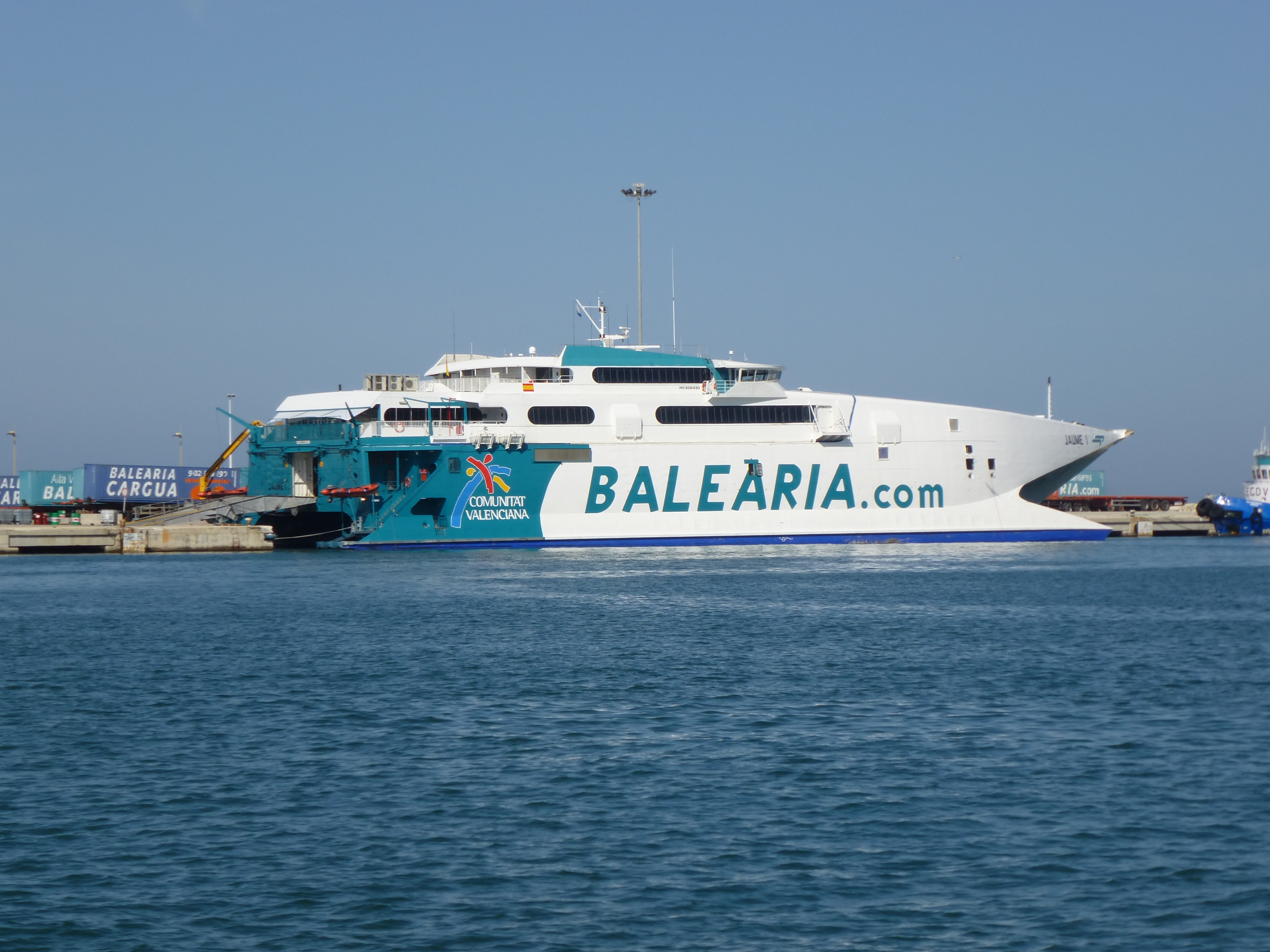
Jaume I

Rusadir

As of December 2024, Baleària operates a fleet of 34 vessels:

Name	Built	Entered service	Notes
Abel Matutes	2010	2010	Named after politician Abel Matutes
Avemar Dos	1997	2008	
Bahama Mama	2010	2010	ex. SF Alhucemas; sister ship of Ciudad de Mahón
Cap de Barbaria	2023	2023	
Cecilia Payne	1999	2018	Named after astronomer Cecilia Payne
Ciudad de Mahón	2008	2024	On charter from Trasmed; sister ship to Bahama Mama
Dénia Ciutat Creativa	1992	2016	
Eco Aire	2018	2018	
Eco Aqua	2018	2018	
Eco Lux	2018	2018	
Eco Terra	2018	2018	
Eleanor Roosevelt	2021	2021	Named after Eleanor Roosevelt
Formentera Direct	1987	2014	
Hedy Lamarr	2010	2011	Named after actress/inventor Hedy Lamarr.
Hypatia de Alejandría	2019	2019	Named after scientist Hypatia; sister ship to Marie Curie
Jaume I	1994	2005	Named after King James I of Majorca
Jaume II	1996	2006	Operated under Baleària Caribbean. Named after King James II of Majorca
Jaume III	1996	2007	Named after King James III of Majorca
Josefina de la Torre	2023	2026	Named after poet Josefina de la Torre
Kerry	2001	2019	
Margarita Salas	2023	2024	€126m. 460 miles range on LNG. Named after scientist Margarita Salas
Marie Curie	2019	2019	Named after physicist Marie Curie; sister ship to Hypatia de Alejandría
Martín i Soler	2008	2008	Named after composer Martín y Soler
Mercedes Pinto	2025	2026	Operated under Baleària Canarias. Named after writer Mercedes Pinto
Nápoles	2002	2015	Sister ship to Sicilia
Nixe	2004	2004	
Passió Per Formentera	2009	2009	
Pepita Castellví	2010	2026	Operated under Baleària Canarias. Named after oceanographer Josefina Castellví
Poeta López Anglada	1984	2012	
Ramón Llull	2003	2003	Named after humanist Ramon Llull
Regina Baltica	1980	2015	
Rosalind Franklin	1989	2025	Named after scientist Rosalind Franklin
Rusadir	2018	2023	
Sicilia	2002	2015	Sister ship to Nápoles
Tom Sawyer	2001	2023	
Volcán de Tagoro	2019	2026	Operated under Baleària Canarias.
Volcán de Taidía	2021	2026	Operated under Baleària Canarias.
Volcán de Tamadaba	2007	2026	Operated under Baleària Canarias.
Volcán de Teno	2000	2026	
Volcán de Tinamar	2011	2026	Operated under Baleària Canarias.
Volcán de Tindaya	2003	2026	Operated under Baleària Canarias.
Volcán de Tirajana	2006	2026	Operated under Baleària Canarias.
Virot	1973	2016	
Visborg	2000	2023	On charter from Destination Gotland
Wasa Express	1981	2022	On charter from United Marine Egypt (UME)

In 2025, Baleària launched the fast ferry Mercedes Pinto, its third vessel equipped with dual-fuel natural gas engines.

=== Past vessels ===
- HSC Al Sabini
- MS Bahia de Malaga - Sold to Kada Denizcilik Turism, renamed Med Dream
- MS Bahia de Ceuta - Sold to Nova Ferries, renamed Ilha Azul
- MS Borja
- MS Borja Dos
- MS Breant
- MS Clipper Racer
- MS Espalmador
- HSC Federico Garía Lorca - Sold to Conferry, renamed San Francisco de Asís
- MS Guido
- MS Hoburgen
- MS Isla de Botafoc - Sold to Ventouris Ferries, renamed Bari
- MS Isla de Ibiza
- MS Meloodia
- HSC Nixe 2 - Sold to Excalibur International Marine, renamed Ocean Lala
- MS Pau Casals
- MS Posidonia - Sold to Caremar, renamed "Nereide"
- MS Rólon Sur
- MS Sonia
- HSC Maverick Dos
- HSC Pinar del Rio - crashed in Denia in August 2019, scrapped.
- MS Posidonia sold to Medmar in 2023

== Incidents ==
On 16 February 2012, the high-speed ferry Maverick Dos ran aground while on passage from Ibiza Town to Formentera. The vessel was carrying 21 passengers and 6 crew members at the time. There was one injury, but all passengers and crew were safely evacuated.
