= HSC Mega Jet =

High-speed catamaran

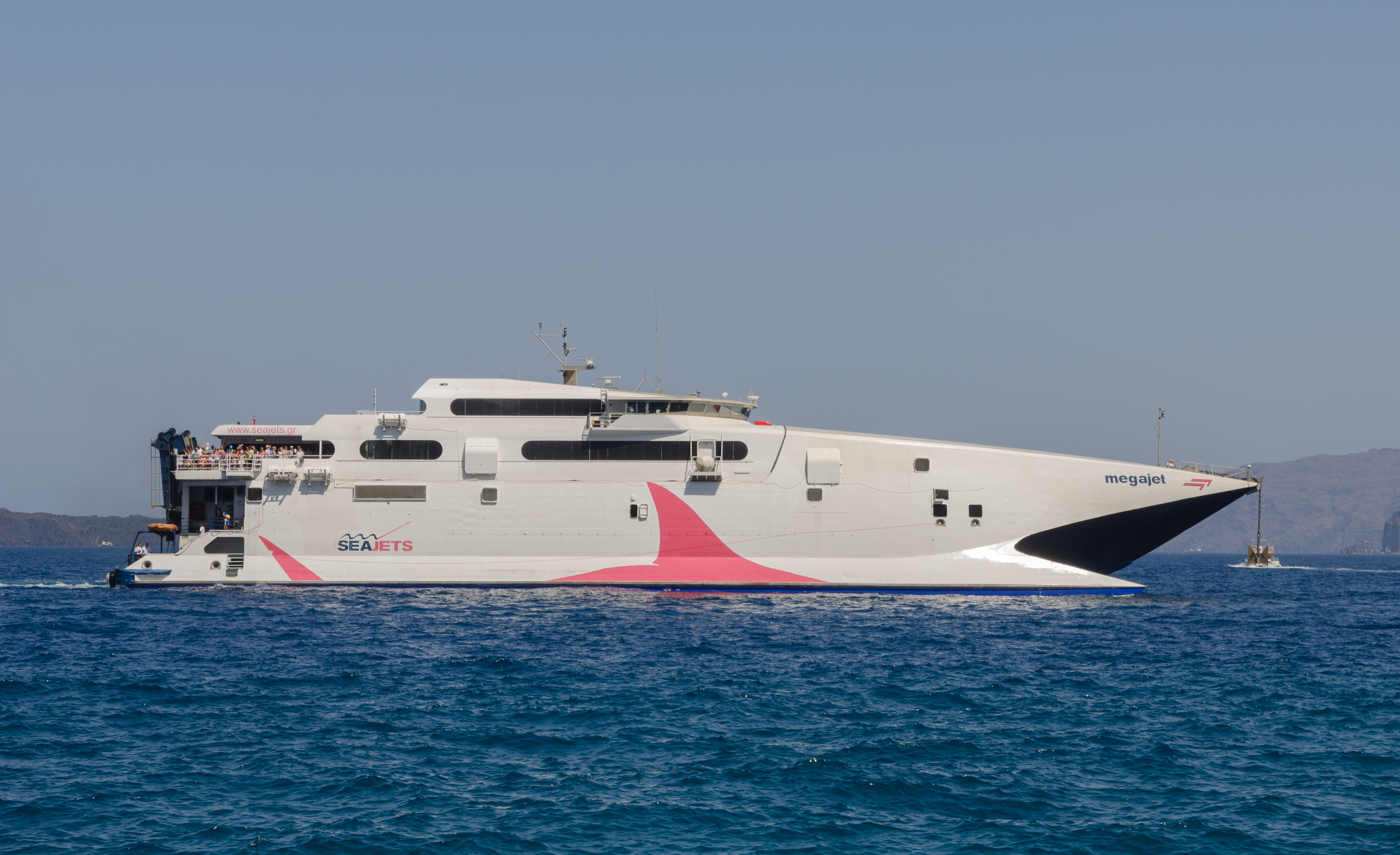
- Mega Jet at Santorini.

History
- Name: 1995–1999: Cat-Link I; 1999–2001: Incat 035; 2001–2004: Thundercat I; 2004–2006: Tarifa Jet; 2006–2008: Thundercat I; 2008–present: Mega Jet
- Operator: 1995–2000: Savory Industries Inc.; 2000–2003: Incat Denmark ApS; 2003–2008: Adriatic Fast Ferries Ltd.; 2008–present: Seajets; 2017/2018/2019: chartered to Alanticolines (seasonal)
- Port of registry: 2008–present: Piraeus, Greece
- Builder: Incat; Hobart, Australia
- Yard number: 035
- Launched: 1995-02-28
- Completed: 1995
- Maiden voyage: 1995
- In service: 1995
- Identification: IMO number: 9106106
- Status: Laid up

General characteristics (as built)
- Tonnage: 3,989 gt
- Length: 77.46 m (254.1 ft)
- Beam: 26.0 m (85.3 ft)
- Draft: 3.5 m (11.5 ft)
- Installed power: 4 x Ruston 16K270 diesel engines
- Propulsion: 4 x Lips 115DLX waterjets
- Speed: 36 knots (67 km/h; 41 mph)
- Capacity: 600 passengers; 50 cars
- Crew: 17

Mega Jet is a prominent high-speed catamaran ferry owned and operated by the Greek shipping company Seajets. Built in 1995, it was a landmark acquisition for the company, serving as their very first large vehicle-carrying high-speed ferry when they purchased it in 2008. It has been laid up in Chalcis since 2020.

== Service ==
The catamaran, the last of a series of three fast sister ships built by the specialist shipyard Incat of Hobart, was launched on 28 February 1995 with the name Cat-Link I and delivered on 1 July to the Danish Cat-Link, from which it was transferred on 28 July to Weymouth, then on 18 August it was put into service between Aarhus and Kalundborg, between the two banks of the Skagerrak, where it was joined in December by the first sister ship Cat-Link II. For the next three years the fast ferry continued to serve the route, until July 1998, when it was replaced by the Cat-Link V and laid up in Portland, where it remained until August 1999, when it was renamed Incat 035 and chartered to Bay Ferries, who placed it on the Miami, Freeport and Nassau routes, where it operated until the end of the summer, when it was again laid up, this time in the Bahamian capital, finally being transferred in 2000 to Charleston.

In May 2001, after almost two years of lay-up in South Carolina, the catamaran was chartered together with its sister ship Incat 033 to the Greek company Ventouris Ferries, by which it was renamed Thundercat I and introduced on the routes between Igoumenitsa, Paxos, Corfu and Brindisi. However, the service soon proved to be a failure and in October, at the end of the summer season, the two units were laid up in Valletta, where, in the case of Thundercat I, it remained in lay-up until August 2004, when it was chartered to FRS Iberia, which changed its name to Tarifa Jet and inserted it on 28 August on the routes between Tarifa and Tangier, between the two shores of the Strait of Gibraltar. On 7 March 2005, while under charter, the catamaran was again renamed Thundercat I, continuing to operate between Spain and Morocco until October 2007, when it was replaced by the Tanger Jet II and laid up in Gibraltar. In March 2008, after six months of lay-up, the fast ferry was sold to the Greek Seajets, by which it was renamed Mega Jet and introduced on 30 April in the connections between Piraeus, Fira and Heraklion, extended the following year, despite the numerous mechanical problems reported during the summer season, to Rethymno, and in 2014, with the addition of the Tera Jet on the line, to Ios, Naxos and Mykonos, to the detriment of the stopover in Attica, already suppressed in 2010. In the two following summers, the Mega Jet continued to serve the inter-Cycladic connection, operating mainly between Crete and Santorini, until 2017, when it was chartered together with the Master Jet to the Portuguese Atlântico Line, by which it was introduced in the connections between Vila do Porto, Ponta Delgada, Praia da Vitória, Velas, Pico and Horta, in the Azores. This charter was repeated in the following two years, and, on 29 April 2020, at the end of the employment, the unit, deemed superfluous, was disarmed in Chalkida, where it is still located today.

== Sister ships ==
- Fares 2
- Jaume I
