= Destination Gotland =

Swedish ferry line

Destination Gotland AB
- Founded: 1998
- Headquarters: Visby, Gotland
- Area served: Gotland, Sweden
- Services: Passenger transportation, Freight transportation
- Parent: Rederi AB Gotland
- Website: www.destinationgotland.se

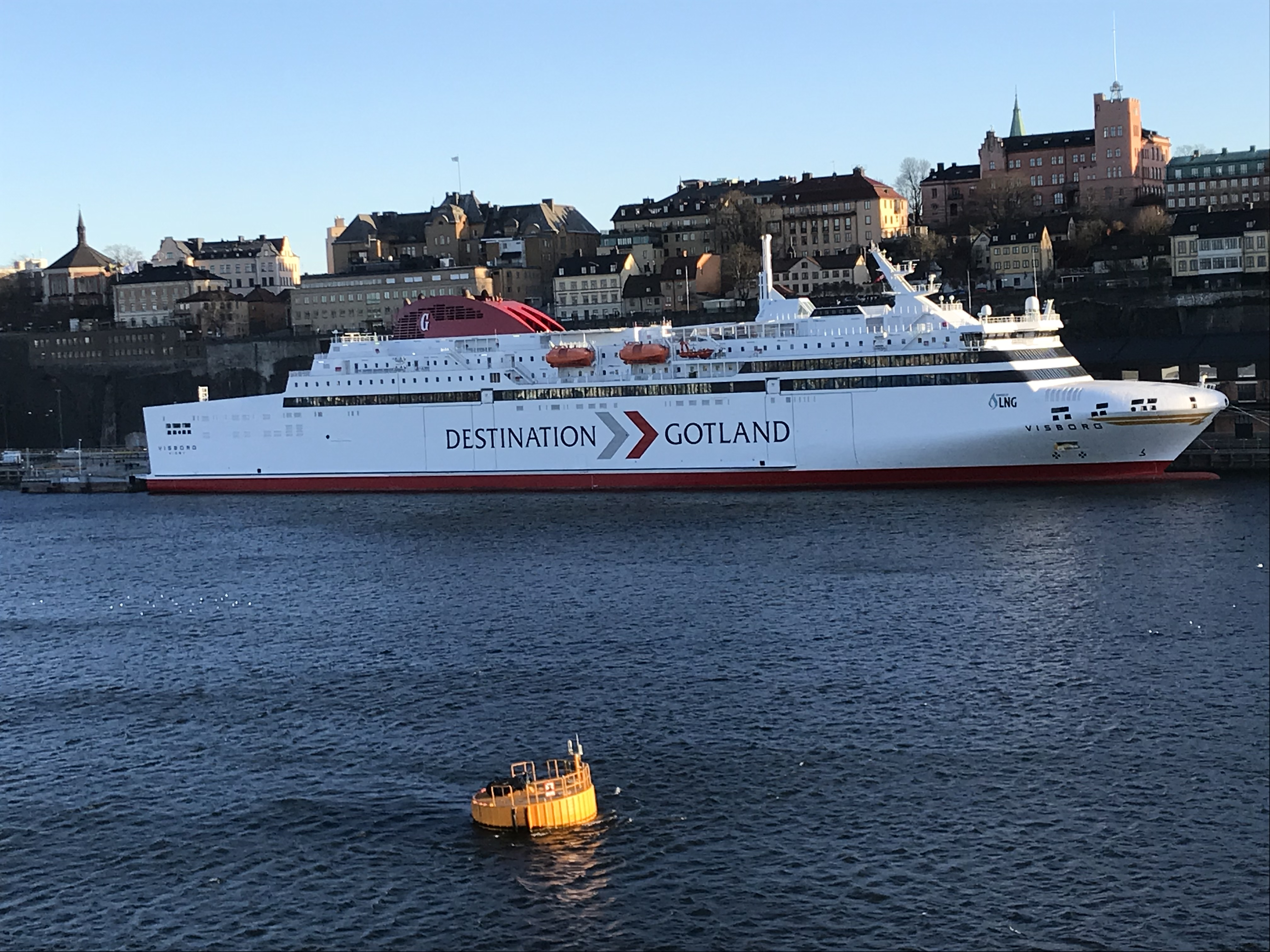
Visby, built in 2019, as Visborg in Stockholm on 23 March 2019.

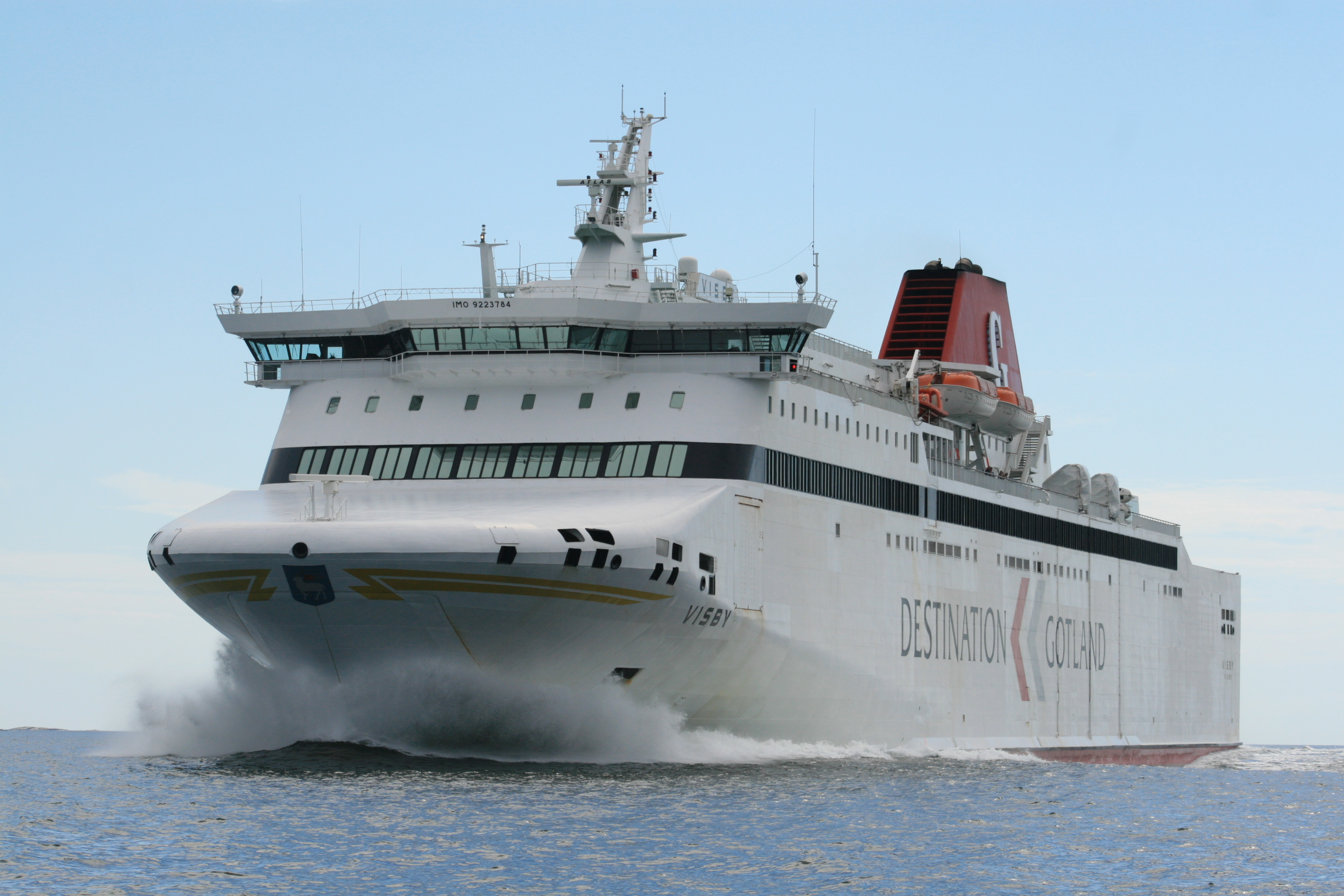
Visborg, built in 2000, as Visby in 2008.

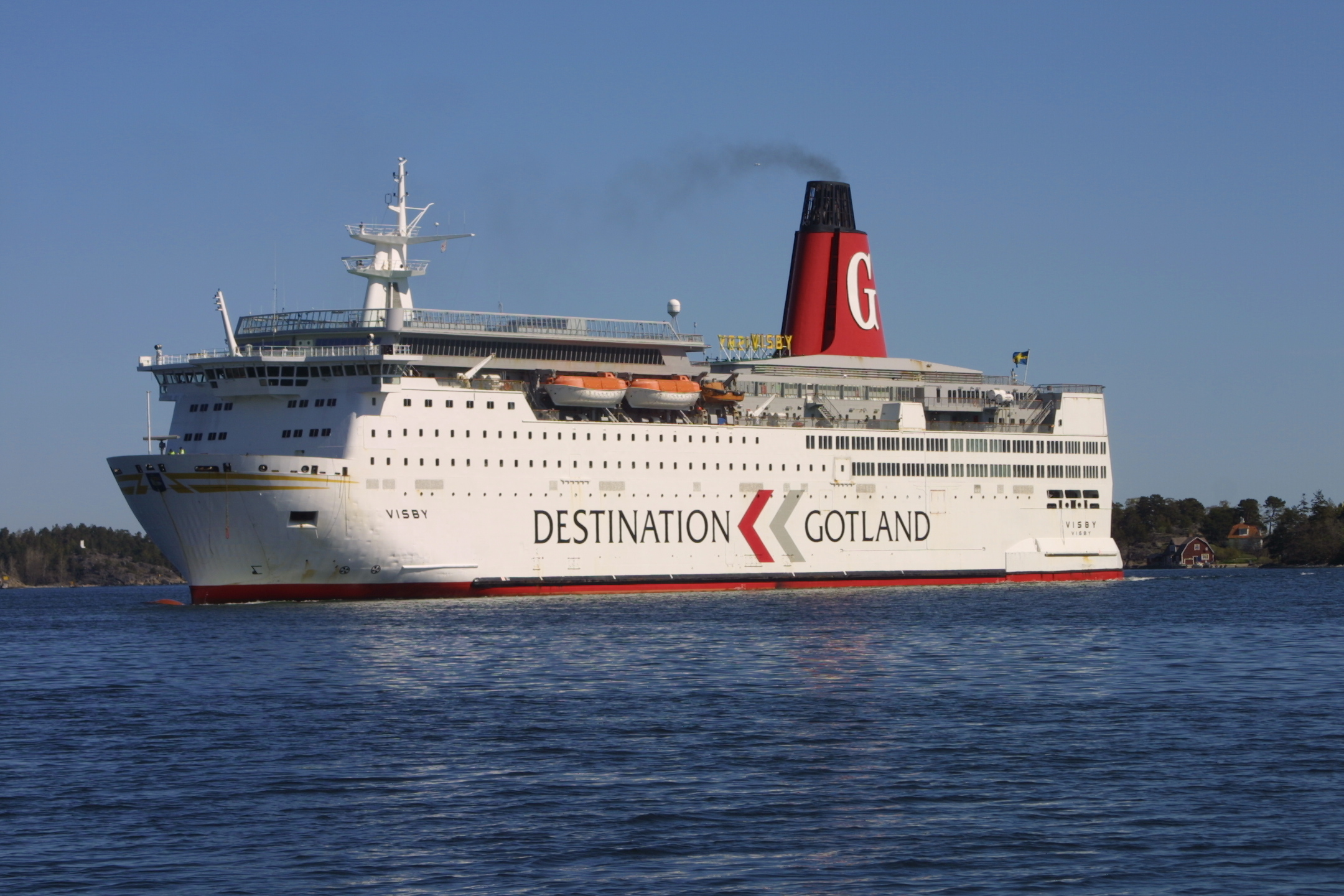
Visby, built in 1980 in Nynashamn on 5 May 2002.

Destination Gotland is a Swedish ferry-line that runs state-subsidised domestic ferries from Nynäshamn and Oskarshamn to Visby on the island of Gotland. It is a wholly owned subsidiary of Rederi AB Gotland, also known as Gotlandsbolaget. The fleet consists of four high-speed Ro-Pax ferries. The transport volumes to the island of Gotland is more than 1.4 million passengers and 640,000 lane meters of freight per year. During the high season the frequency is up to 16 departures per day to between the mainland of Sweden and the island of Gotland.

== History ==
Destination Gotland was founded in 1998 and has since that served the routes Visby to Nynäshamn and Oskarshamn. Originally 75% of the company was owned by Rederi AB Gotland and 25% by Silja Line. In January 1999 Silja Line sold its share in the company to Rederi AB Gotland, who from then has been the sole owner of the company. At the same time Destination Gotland changed from using Silja Lines reservations system to the BOOKIT reservations system, which is now used for all their ferry reservations and ticketing.

In the summer of 2007 Destination Gotland begun to run a service between the island of Gotland and the island of Öland. This service ceased in 2009.

In August 2021 a new ferry company, Hansa Destinations, was launched as a sister company to Destination Gotland within the Rederi AB Gotland group. The new company operates between Nynäshamn and Rostock in Germany, with some sailings stopping additionally in Visby. However, due to high fuel costs, Hansa Destinations have cancelled their services for 2023. In November 2024, the company bought the Oslo-Copenhagen ferry line with 2 ferries from DFDS. In 2026, the company bought 30% of Nordic Ferry Infrastructure, the owner of Molslinjen and Torghatten.

== Fleet ==
=== Current fleet ===
- Drotten (2001) ex Gotland
- Visby (2018) ex Visborg
- Gotland (2019) ex Thjelvar
- Nordic Pearl (1989)
- Nordic Crown (1994)

=== Past fleet ===
- Gute (1979)
- Visby (1980)
- Thjelvar (1981)
- SuperRunner Jet II ex Gotland
- Gotlandia II (2006)

=== On charter ===
- Visborg (2000) ex Visby. On charter to Baleària.

=== Coming ships ===
Gotland Horizon X, catamaran for Gotland in 2028
