= Baja Ferries =

Mexican ferry company

Baja Ferries bajaferries S.A de C.V
- A Baja Ferries vessel docked in La Paz.
- Type: Private company
- Industry: Transportation
- Founded: 2003; 23 years ago
- Headquarters: Prof. Marcelo Rubio Ruiz 1025, Zona Central 23000, La Paz, Baja California Sur, Mexico
- Area served: Sea of Cortes
- Key people: Ruano Brinqueiro (President)
- Services: Ferry transportation Ro-on/Ro-off transportation
- Owner: Mariano Ruano Boza (Chairman)
- Parent: Baja Ferries S.A de C.V
- Divisions: Geos
- Website: www.bajaferries.com.mx

Baja Ferries (also known as: bajaferries S.A de C.V) is a Mexican shipping company dedicated to ferry transportation across the Sea of Cortes. Its headquarters are located in La Paz, Baja California Sur.

The company was founded in 2003 by Mariano Ruano Boza to transport passengers between the Mexican States of Sinaloa and Baja California Sur. The company included the subsidiary dedicated to trucking transportation company Transportadora GEOS.

== History ==
The origins of Baja Ferries date back to 1991 when the French shipowner Daniel Berrebi obtained import/export contracts for Mexico from Alstom. In 1994 following the entry into force of the North American Free Trade Agreement (NAFTA), Berrebi opened a first freight line between Mexico and the US initially then on the Western Mexican Coast from 1996. In 2001 the shipowner began its passenger transport activities by commissioning a high-speed ship between La Paz and Topolobampo, Sinaloa.

In 2003, Berrebi chartered a mixed vessel with a rolling capacity of 2,100 linear meters from the Italian shipyard Visentini. Becoming the California Star, it inaugurated the activities of the company Baja Ferries, created for the occasion. The following year a second ship joined the fleet, the car ferry Coromuel, renamed Sinaloa Star.

In 2007, Baja Ferries bought the car ferry Victory from the Italian company Grandi Navi Veloci and put it into service under the name Chihuahua Star, replacing the Sinaloa Star, which was leaving the fleet.

In 2010, a new mixed vessel was integrated into the fleet, the Monte Cinto, bought from SNCM, which took the name of Mazatlan Star. His arrival allows the transfer in 2011 of the Chihuahua Star within the company America Cruise Ferries, another company owned by Daniel Berrebi operating lines in the Caribbean between Puerto Rico and the Dominican Republic.

A new Ro-Ro carrier was put into service in 2013, the ex-Strada Corsa, bought in Italy after the bankruptcy of its owner and put into service under the name La Paz Star.

In November 2014, the company embarked on the race to take over SNCM, placed in receivership by the Commercial Court of Marseille. Based on a plan to reduce the company's scope of activity to Marseille-Corsica lines alone, subsidized under the public service delegation, and the development of lines with the Maghreb, with in particular the opening of a line to Morocco, its offer will be modified several times as the deadline is pushed back. Baja Ferries will in particular try to form a common front with the STEF Group before the latter decides to withdraw. Its offer will finally be discarded in favor of that of the Corsican transporter Rocca.

It is for this reason that, from January 2016, Baja Ferries joined the consortium of Corsican companies Corsica Maritima, also a candidate for the takeover of SNCM, and participated in the launch of the company Corsica Linea by chartering the ro-ro ship to it. Stena Carrier, intended to compete with the new company succeeding SNCM between Marseille and Corsica. However, the two companies merging in April 2016, Baja Ferries will withdraw from the project. The Stena Carrier will join the company's fleet in 2018 under the name of México Star, as will another chartered ro-ro to serve Ajaccio. which would eventually join Baja Ferries in 2016 as Cabo Star before being chartered overseas.

That same year, 2016 his ship, the former Chihuahua Star, chartered by ACF under the name Caribbean Fantasy, suffered a fire in the Caribbean in August. The extent of the damage led to her being sold for scrap the following year.

This vessel was then replaced within the fleet by the Baja Star, a 170-metre car ferry purchased from the Chinese company Rizhao Ferries. First placed on the charter market, she joined the lines of Baja Ferries at the end of 2019 after the sale of the California Star.

== Fleet ==
=== Current fleet ===
Ship	Flag	Type	In service	Entry with fleet	tonnage	Length	Width	Capacity			Knots	Status	Image
Ship	Flag	Type	In service	Entry with fleet	tonnage	Length	Width	Passengers	Vehicles	Trailers	Knots	Status	Image
México Star	Mexico	Ro-Ro	2004	2018	21,089 UMS	182.60 m	25.50 m	12	–	2775 m	22 knots	In service	
Balandra Star	Panama	Ro-Ro	1990	2016	5,925 UMS	91,50 m	¿? m		–				

=== Old Fleet ===
Ship	Flag	Type	In service	Period	tonnage	Length	Width	Passengers	Vehicles	Knots	Status	Image
California Star	Mexico	Mixed vessel	2001	2003–2019	25,000 UMS	186.49 m	25.60 m	1000	75	22,5 knots	Sold to Adria Ferries, currently in service in the Mediterranean under name of AF Claudia.	
Caribbean Fantasy	Panama	Ferry	1989	2008–2017	27,362 UMS	187.13 m	27 m	950	550	23,5 knots	Service from 2011 to 2016 and sold to America Cruise Ferries. Caught fire in 2016, Scrapped in Aliağa in 2017.	
La Paz Star	Mexico	Ro-Ro	1978	2013–2016	16,776 UMS	151.94 m	23.50 m	12	1650 m linéaires	17 knots	Resold to Fabrilo Holdings, finally Scrapped in 2017.	
Mazatlan Star	Mexico	Mixed vessel	1984	2010–2014	14,798 UMS	136.04 m	22.52 m	111	35	18 knots	Sold to Chilean company Navimag renamed Eden. Scrapped in 2019.	
Sinaloa Star	Mexico	Ferry	1973	2004–2008	7,234 UMS	108.70 m	17.20 m	650	220	16 knots	Scrapped in Alang.	
Cabo Star	Panama	Ro-Ro	1988	2016	19,963 UMS	157.51 m	25.32 m	12	2100	20,5 knots	Sold to Trinidad and Tobago. Now belongs to Seajets	
Baja Star	Mexico	Fast Ferry	1992	2016	24,946 UMS	170 m	25 m	705	90	26 knots	Sold to Ventouris Ferries in 2024	
