= HSC Jaume I =

Incat HSC catamaran

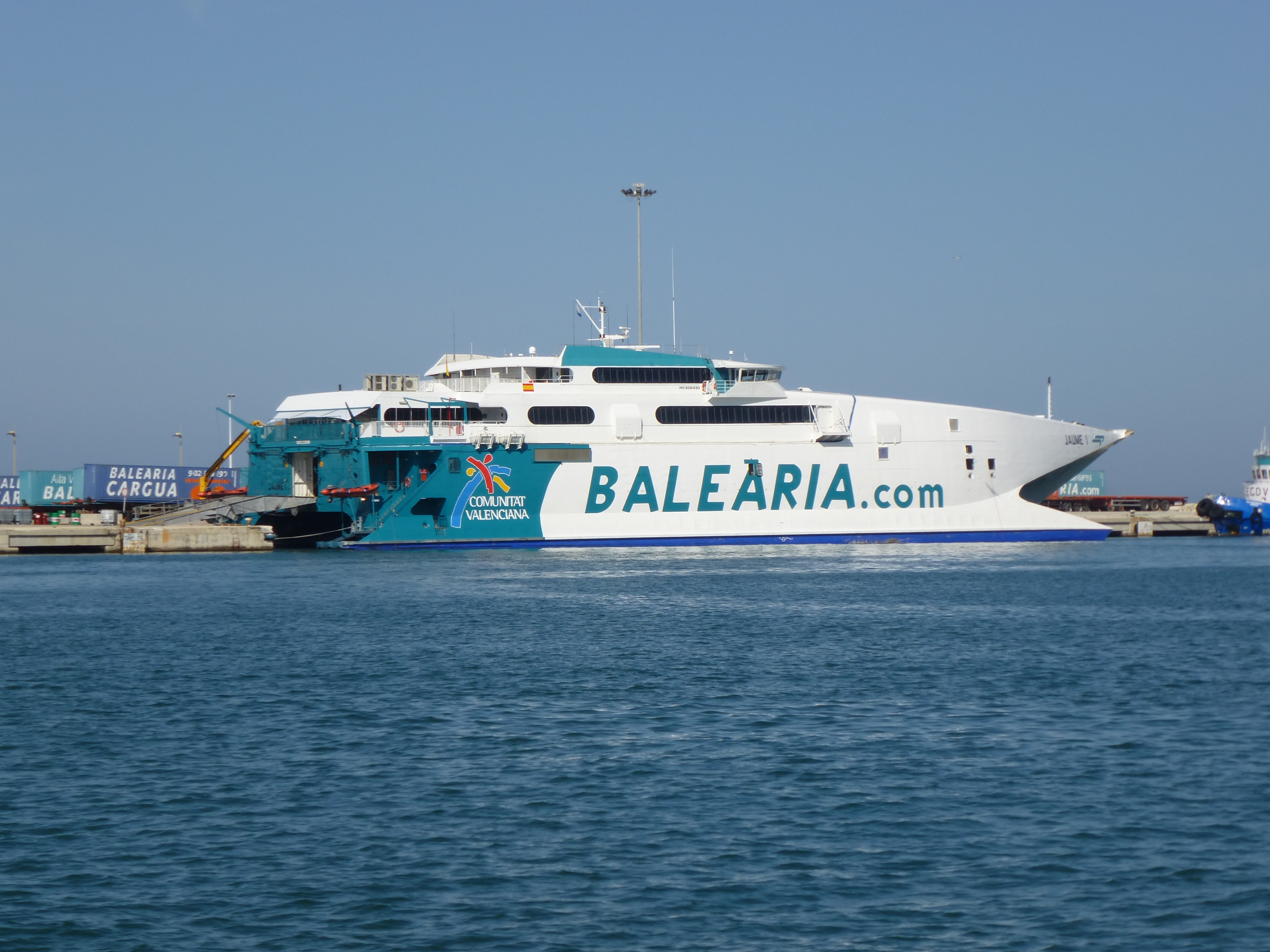
- Jaume I in Denia

History
- Name: 1994–1996: Stena Sea Lynx II; 1996–1998: Stena Lynx II; 1998–1999: Ronda Marina; 1999–2000: Incat 033; 2000: Fast Ceuta; 2000–2001: Incat 033; 2001–2005: Thundercat II; 2005–present: Jaume I
- Owner: 1994–1998: Stena Line/Stena Sealink Line; 1998–1999: Buquebus; 1999–2001: Incat Chartering/International Catamarans; 2001–2005: Ventouris Ferries; 2005–present: Baleària (Baleària Eurolineas Marítimas)
- Operator: 1994–1996: Stena Sealink Line; 1996–1998: Stena Line; 1998–1999: Buquebus; 1999: Líneas Fred. Olsen; 2000: Trasmediterránea; 2001–2005: Ventouris Ferries; 2005–present: Baleària; 2025: Trasmediterránea/DFDS
- Port of registry: 1994–2000: Nassau, Bahamas; 2000–2005: Valletta, Malta; 2005–2008: Santa Cruz de Tenerife, Spain; 2008–2013: Valletta, Malta; 2013–2015: Santa Cruz de Tenerife, Spain; 2015–2020: Valletta, Malta; 2020–present: Limassol, Cyprus
- Route: Alcúdia-Ciutadella de Menorca
- Ordered: 1993
- Builder: Incat Tasmania; Hobart, Tasmania, Australia
- Yard number: 033
- Completed: May 1994
- Acquired: June 2005
- In service: 1994
- Identification: IMO number: 9081693; Call sign: 5BKY5; MMSI number: 209873000
- Status: In service

General characteristics
- Class & type: Incat 78m wave-piercing catamaran
- Tonnage: 3,989 GT; 250 DWT
- Length: 77.46 m (254 ft 2 in)
- Beam: 26.00 m (85 ft 4 in)
- Draft: 2.72 m (8 ft 11 in)
- Decks: 3
- Ramps: Stern loading ramps
- Installed power: 4 × Caterpillar 3616 V16 diesel engines
- Propulsion: 4 × Lips waterjets
- Speed: 36.0 knots (66.7 km/h; 41.4 mph) (service) 40.0 knots (74.1 km/h; 46.0 mph) (max)
- Capacity: 655 passengers; 144 vehicles

Jaume I is a 78-metre high-speed wave-piercing catamaran passenger and vehicle ferry built in 1994 by Incat Tasmania (Hull 033). Originally entering service on the Irish Sea as Stena Sea Lynx II (later Stena Lynx II), she subsequently operated under several names—including Ronda Marina, Fast Ceuta, and Thundercat II—across South America, the English Channel, and Greece. Acquired by Spanish operator Baleària in 2005 and renamed Jaume I (in honor of King James I of Aragon), the vessel has since operated key Mediterranean and Strait of Gibraltar routes, connecting mainland Spain with the Balearic Islands and North Africa.

== Service ==
The catamaran, the first of a series of three sister vessels built by the specialist shipyard Incat of Hobart, was launched on 8 February 1994 on a speculative basis under the name Incat 033, corresponding to her construction number, and delivered on 1 May to the Uruguayan company Buquebus, from which she was bareboat chartered to Stena Line, who renamed her Stena Sea Lynx II and transferred her to Holyhead on 18 June, where she was christened two days later, starting on 22 June to link the Welsh port of Holyhead with Dún Laoghaire. On 13 February 1996, less than a year after entering service, the service was cancelled and the catamaran was transferred to the Dover - Calais service, across the English Channel, with the name changed to Stena Lynx II, operating there until 15 June, when, with the imminent entry into service of the new Stena Lynx III, it was moved to the Gothenburg - Frederikshavn service, operating again for only a few months, until 11 August, when it was laid up in Sweden, before returning to service in 1997, this time between Newhaven and Dieppe. In September of the same year, upon completion of the charter, the catamaran returned to Buquebus, by which it was renamed Ronda Marina and put on the routes between Algeciras and Ceuta, under the banner of the Spanish branch, for which it operated until July 1999, when it was bought back by Incat, which laid it up in Portland on 19 July, renaming it for the second time Incat 033, but nevertheless renting it shortly after to Fred. Olsen Express, who used it for some months on the routes between the Canary Islands.

On 15 May 2000, after several months of lay-up, the catamaran was again chartered in Spain, this time to Trasmediterránea, by which it was renamed Fast Ceuta and reintroduced eight days later on the routes between Algeciras and Ceuta, which it served until the following October, when it was laid up in Valletta, remaining there until April 2001, when it was chartered together with its sister ship Incat 035 to the Greek company Ventouris Ferries, by which it was renamed Thundercat II and introduced on the routes between Igoumenitsa, Paxos, Corfu and Brindisi. However, the service soon proved to be a failure and in October, at the end of the summer season, the two units were laid up in Valletta, where, in the case of Thundercat II, it remained in dock until May 2005, when it was purchased by Baleària, from which it was transferred to the shipyards of Cadiz, where it was renamed Jaume I and prepared for entry into service on the routes between Barcelona and Palma de Mallorca, which took place on 22 June. On 12 October, at the end of the first season, the catamaran was then moved to the routes between Algeciras and Tangier Med, where it operated until December 2007, when it was moved permanently to those between the Andalusian port and Ceuta. In the following years, the catamaran continued to operate regularly between the two shores of the Strait of Gibraltar, until the first months of 2016, when it set sail for Freeport, in the Bahamas, which on 15 March began connecting to Port Everglades, in Florida, under the banner of Baleària Caribbean. Also in this case, for the following two years the fast ferry operated the route, until January 2019, when it was replaced by its almost twin Jaume II and transferred back to Spain, where on 29 June it resumed service on the connections between Andalusia and Morocco, after being refitted and re-engined in the San Giorgio del Porto shipyards in Genoa. Subsequently, on 20 August of the same year, the catamaran was moved to the connections between Dénia, Ibiza and Palma de Mallorca, where it also operated in the 2020 and 2022 summer seasons, returning instead from February 2021 to service on the connections between Spain and Morocco, occasionally extended to Ceuta, such as from 3 March to 1 April 2025, on behalf, first of Trasmediterránea, and then of DFDS, in the first case replacing the Villa de Agaete, in the second replacing the Ramon Llull. On 24 May 2025, the catamaran was finally placed on the Tarifa - Tangier route, where it operated until 3 April 2026, when it was replaced by the Cecilia Payne, and, after a short two-day deployment between Algeciras and Tangier Med, transferred permanently on 7 April to the Alcúdia - Ciutadella de Menorca route, replacing the Jaume III.

== Sister ships ==
- Fares 2
- Mega Jet
