= MS Roger =

Scrapped ferry

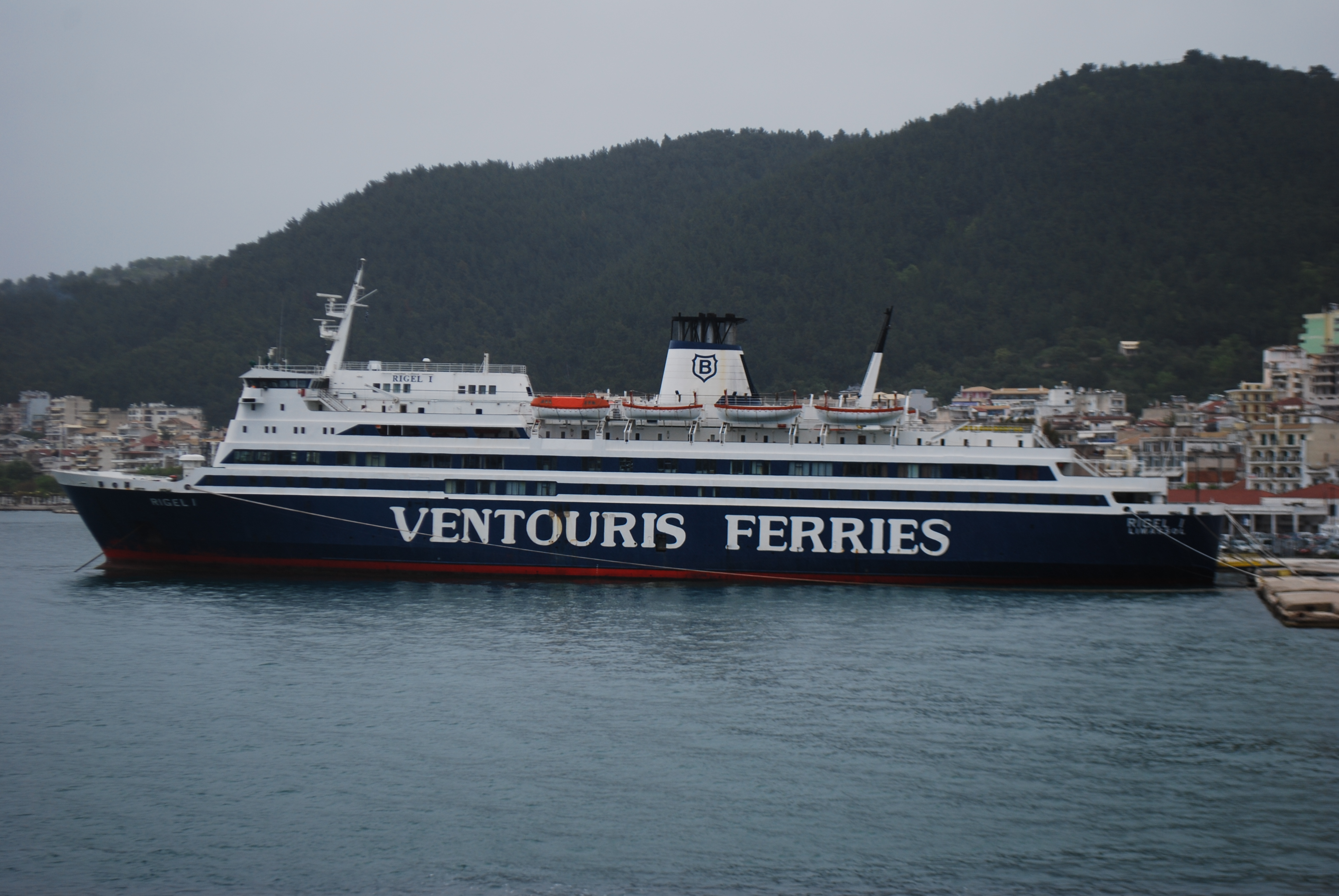
- Rigel I in Igoumenitsa

History
- Name: 1973–1980: Bore 1; 1980–1983: Skandia; 1983: Stena Baltica; 1983–1997: Ilich; 1997: Anastasia V; 1997: Windward Pride; 1997–2007: Baltic Kristina; 2007: Atlas 1; 2007: Badis; 2007–2013: Rigel; 2013–2021: Rigel I; 2021: Roger
- Owner: 1973–1980: Silja Line (Bore Line); 1980–1983: Effoa; 1983–1997: Baltic Shipping Company; 1997–2007: Tallink / Euroscandic; 2007–2021: Ventouris Ferries
- Operator: 1973–1980: Silja Line; 1983–1997: Baltic Shipping Company; 1997–2007: Tallink; 2007–2021: Ventouris Ferries
- Port of registry: Helsinki, Finland (1973–1983); Nassau, Bahamas (1983); Leningrad / Saint Petersburg, Russia (1983–1996); Kingstown, Saint Vincent and the Grenadines (1997); Tallinn, Estonia (1997–2005); Riga, Latvia (2005–2007); Panama City, Panama (2007–2013); Limassol, Cyprus (2013–2021); Moroni, Comoros (2021)
- Route: Bari ↔ Durrës
- Ordered: 28 August 1969
- Builder: Wärtsilä Åbo; Turku, Finland
- Yard number: 1199
- Laid down: 27 April 1972
- Launched: 11 July 1972
- Completed: 15 March 1973
- Acquired: 2007
- Maiden voyage: 17 March 1973
- In service: 1973
- Out of service: August 2021
- Identification: IMO number: 7224459; Call sign: P3JC7
- Fate: Sold for scrap in August 2021; beached at Alang, India, on 9 October 2021.
- Status: Scrapped

General characteristics
- Class & type: Ro-Pax Ferry
- Tonnage: 12,281 GT
- Length: 128.02 m (420 ft 0 in)
- Beam: 22.05 m (72 ft 4 in)
- Draft: 5.9 m (19 ft 4 in)
- Ramps: Bow and stern loading ramps
- Installed power: 4 × Sulzer-Wärtsilä 9ZH40/48 diesel engines (total 13,240 kW)
- Propulsion: 2 × controllable pitch propellers
- Speed: 19.0 knots (35.2 km/h; 21.9 mph) (service) / 22.0 knots (40.7 km/h; 25.3 mph) (max)
- Capacity: 1,200 passengers; 359 cars
- Crew: ~140

Roger was a Finnish-built Ro-Pax cruise ferry operated predominantly by Greek carrier Ventouris Ferries on Adriatic routes connecting Italy and Albania. Launched in 1973 as Bore 1 for Silja Line, the 128-meter vessel spent nearly three decades in the Baltic and Caribbean seas under various names, including Skandia, Ilich, and Baltic Kristina, before being acquired by Ventouris Ferries in 2007 as Rigel (later Rigel I), serving the Bari–Durrës route for 14 years until she was sold for scrap in August 2021 and beached at Alang under the transfer name Roger.

== Service ==
The Bore I was ordered on 28 August 1969 and laid down on 27 April 1972 at the Wärtsilä shipyard in Turku under hull number 1199. After being launched on 11 July 1973 and handed over to the shipping company Ångfartygs Ab Bore in Turku on 15 March 1973, the ship commenced ferry service between Stockholm and Mariehamn on 17 March under the management of Silja Line. A distinctive feature of the Bore I was its two funnels, which were later replaced by a single funnel.

In 1980, the ship was acquired by Finska Ångfartygs Ab and renamed Skandia. It remained in service until November 1982, was then laid up for six months, and resumed service in May 1983 on the Larvik to Frederikshavn route under charter from Larvik-Frederikshavnferjen. That same year, it also briefly called at Stockholm and Mariehamn. In October 1983, it was initially transferred to Stena Line as Stena Baltica, but never entered service for them and was instead sold later that month to the Baltic Shipping Company in Leningrad as Ilich. Before entering service on the Leningrad-Stockholm route in May 1984, it underwent extensive refitting, including the installation of its new, single funnel.

From March 1995, the Ilich, under the management of Baltic Line, called at the ports of Nynäshamn and Riga, before this service ended in December of the same year when the ship was impounded in Stockholm due to outstanding debts. The ferry was auctioned off in August 1996 and shortly thereafter renamed Anastasia V. In February 1997, the ship was impounded a second time, this time in Turku. It wasn't until July 1997 that it was able to resume service under the name Windward Pride for the Kingstown- based company Windward Venture, operating between St. Lucia, Barbados, St. Vincent and Trinidad to Venezuela. However, this service was also short-lived and ended the following month.

In October 1997, the ferry was transferred to Estline as the Baltic Kristina and began operating a scheduled service between Tallinn and Stockholm – initially as a cargo ship, and from 1998 also carrying passengers. In 2000, the shipping company Tallink took over this service. Except for several charter trips in 2002, the ship remained on this route until October 2005. It was auctioned off in December 2005 but did not initially return to service. In March 2007, it was renamed Atlas 1, but a planned deployment under this name never materialized. A month later, the ferry, now called Badis, began service for Comarit between Al Hoceima and Almería, as well as from Algeciras to Tangier. The last crossing for Comarit ended on September 7, 2007.

Ventouris Ferries operated the ship from December 2007, initially as Rigel, then from April 2013 as Rigel I between Bari and Durrës. In 2011, it also assisted in the evacuation of refugees from Libya during the Arab Spring. After a total of 48 years of service, Rigel I was sold for scrapping to India in August 2021 and given the temporary name Roger, the ferry's twelfth and final name. Flying the Comorian flag, Roger arrived at the Alang shipbreaking yards on October 5, 2021, and was beached for scrapping four days later.
