= MS Rigel II =

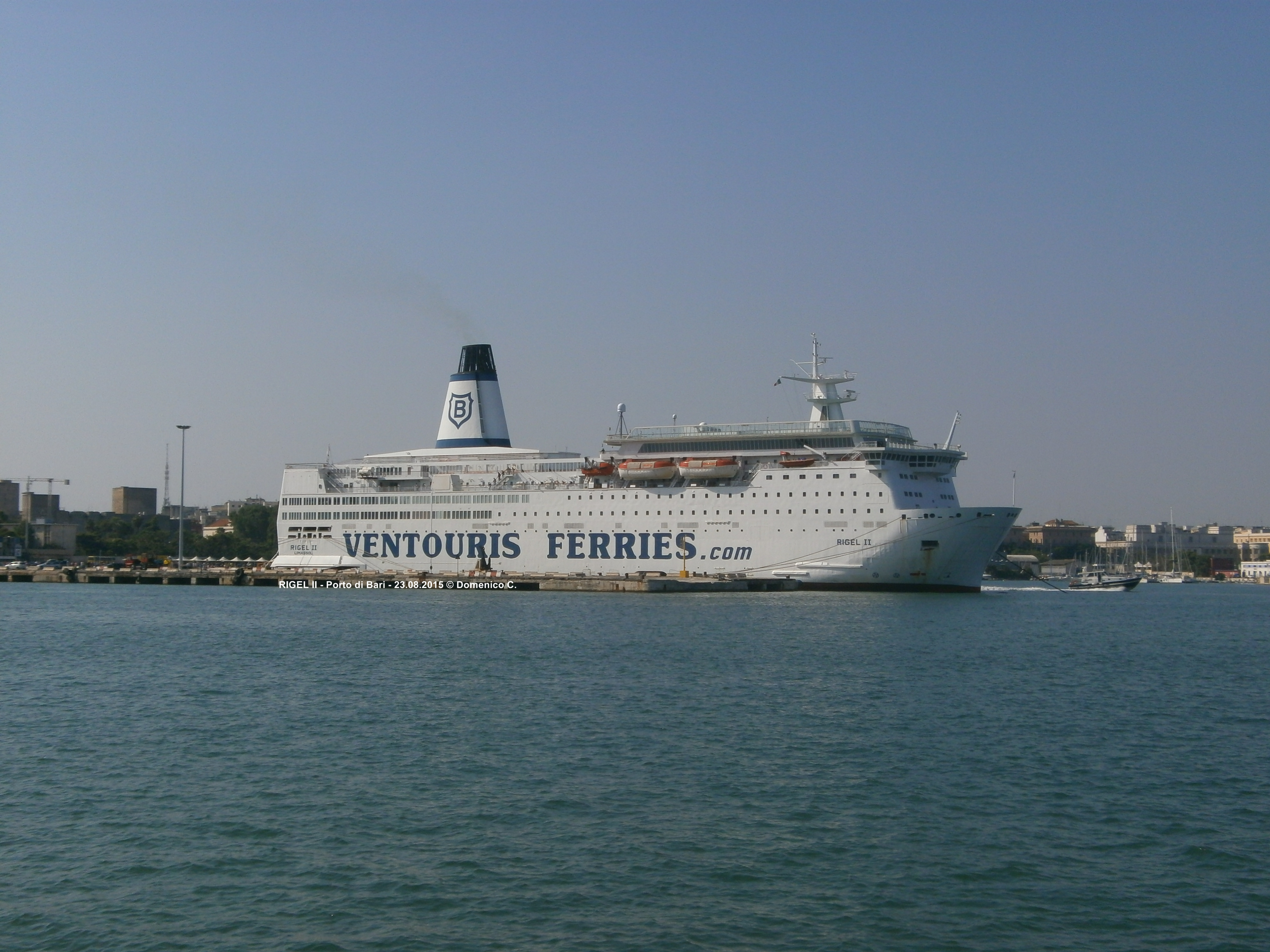
- Rigel II in Bari

History
- Name: 1980–1990: Visby; 1990–1990: Felicity; 1990–1997: Stena Felicity; 1997–2003: Visby; 2003–2003: Visborg; 2003–2015: Scandinavia; 2015–present: Rigel II
- Owner: Ventouris Ferries
- Operator: 1980–1988: Rederi AB Gotland; 1988–1990: Gotlandslinjen; 1990–1991: Sealink British Ferries; 1991–1993: Sealink Stena Line; 1993–1996: Stena Sealink Line; 1996–1997: Stena Line; 1997–2003: Destination Gotland; 2003–2015: Polferries; 2015–present: Ventouris Ferries
- Port of registry: 1980–2003: Visby, Sweden; 2003–2015: Nassau, Bahamas; 2015–present: Limassol, Cyprus
- Builder: Öresundsvarvet, Landskrona, Sweden
- Yard number: 278
- Launched: 25 January 1980
- Identification: Call sign: 5BGR4; IMO number: 7826788; MMSI number: 209077000
- Status: Laid up

General characteristics (after 1997 rebuild)
- Class & type: Visby-class cruiseferry
- Tonnage: 23,842 GT
- Length: 146.10 m (479 ft 4 in)
- Beam: 25.90 m (85 ft 0 in)
- Draught: 5.71 m (18 ft 9 in)
- Installed power: 4 × B&W 8K45 GUC diesel engines
- Propulsion: 2 × controllable pitch propellers; 2 × bow thrusters
- Speed: 18 knots (33 km/h; 21 mph)
- Capacity: 2,072 passengers; 515 cars

Rigel II is a cruiseferry owned and operated by the Greek shipping company Ventouris Ferries. The vessel operates between Bari and Durrës.

== Sister Ship ==
Rigel II is the first of two sister ships built. The second vessel currently operates for Grandi Navi Veloci as GNV Azzurra.

== History ==
The vessel was launched in January 1980 as Visby for Rederi AB Gotland. She was the first of two identical ships built by Öresundsvarvet in Landskrona.

Visby entered service between Gotland and the Swedish mainland ports of Nynäshamn and Oskarshamn. In 1987, the contract to run ferry services to Gotland was awarded to Gotlandslinjen. Visby was chartered to the new operator until replaced by Nord Gotlandia in 1990.

In 1990, Visby was chartered to United Kingdom-based ferry operator Sealink British Ferries for service between Fishguard and Rosslare. Following a major refit in Tilbury, the vessel entered service in March 1990 as Felicity. She remained the largest ferry on the Irish Sea until the arrival of Isle of Innisfree in 1995. Felicity was renamed Stena Felicity in 1991 following the acquisition of Sealink British Ferries by Stena Line.

Stena Felicity's cinema was on one of the lowest deck, and close to the centre of the vessel between port and starboard, fore and aft. Adjacent were separate male and female saunas with Jacuzzis. Either was an ideal place to cross the St George's Channel in stormy weather because, being so low down and close to the centre of the ship, the rough sea state had very little effect.

In 1997, the charter of Stena Felicity ended. Her place on the Fishguard route was taken by Koningin Beatrix. Following a rebuild in Germany, the vessel re-entered Gotland service in 1998 under her original name of Visby. In 2003 Visby was renamed Visborg to release her name for a new vessel under construction in China.

In 2003, she was sold to Polferries and renamed Scandinavia for service between Gdańsk and Nynäshamn. The vessel's last trip between Nynäshamn and Gdańsk took place on 8 May 2015. The ship was sold to Ventouris Ferries and renamed to Rigel II.
