= MV Rusadir =

Spanish ferry

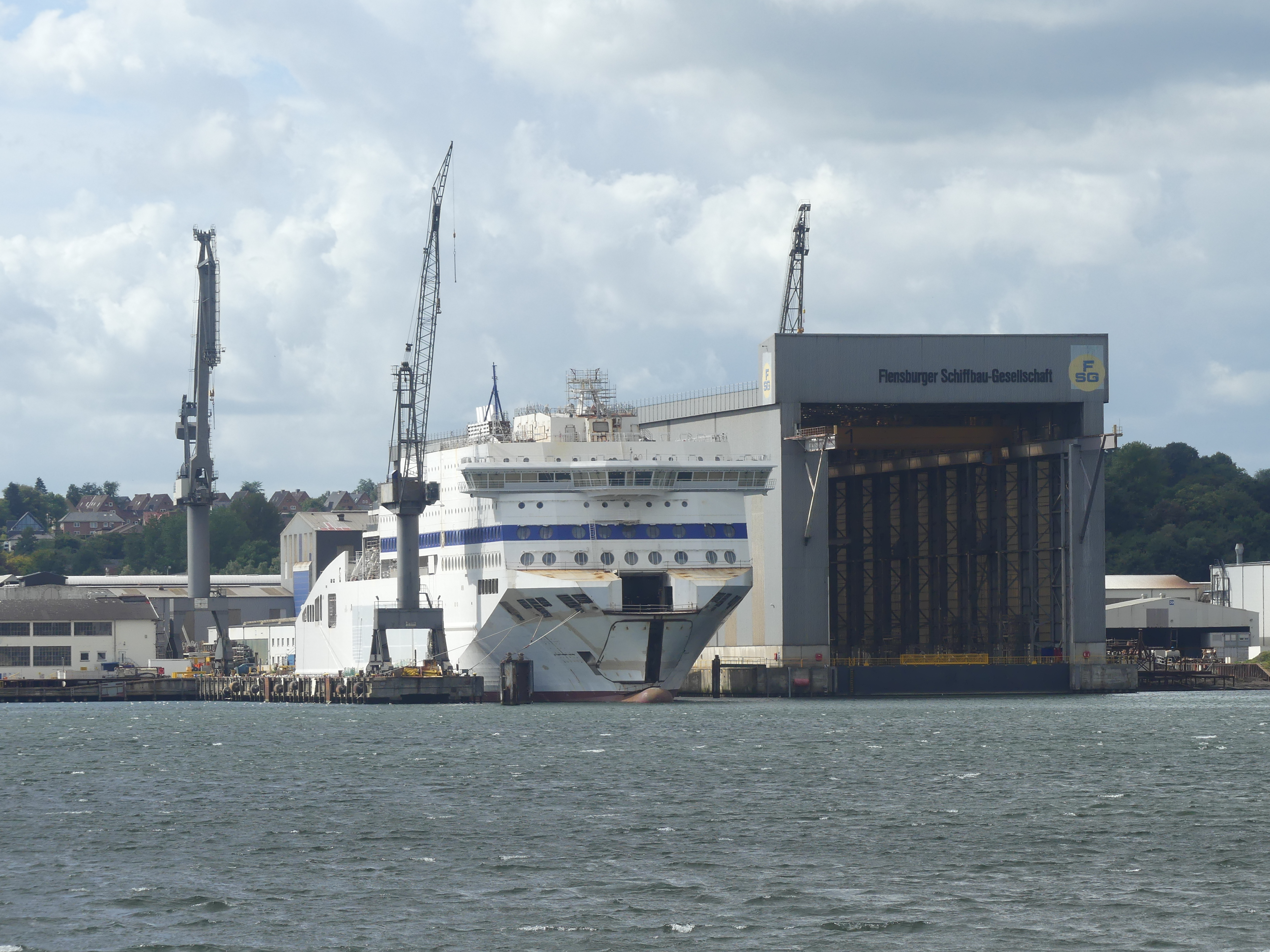
- Honfleur at FSG shipyard

History

Cyprus
- Name: Honfleur (intended); 2023 Rusadir
- Operator: Brittany Ferries (cancelled 2020); Baleària (2023)
- Port of registry: Limassol
- Ordered: 2017
- Builder: Flensburger Schiffbau-Gesellschaft, Flensburg, Germany; Fosen Yards, Trondheim, Norway (completion)
- Cost: Approx. €200 million (2017) (equivalent to €213.92 million in 2021)
- Yard number: 774 (Flensburger)
- Laid down: August 2018
- Launched: 14 December 2018
- In service: May 2023
- Identification: IMO number: 9832119

General characteristics
- Class & type: Roll on/roll off-passenger
- Tonnage: 42,400 GT
- Length: 187.4 m (615 ft)
- Beam: 31 m (102 ft)
- Draught: 6.6 m (22 ft) (maximum)
- Installed power: Total shaft power 30,000 kW.
- Propulsion: 4 x LNG powered engines
- Speed: 22 kn
- Capacity: 1,680 passengers
- Crew: Approx 130

The Rusadir is a roll on/roll off passenger vessel launched in 2018 by Flensburger Schiffbau Gesellschaft in Germany. She was to have been operated by Brittany Ferries as Honfleur, but they cancelled the contract in 2020 after extended delays. The incomplete vessel was then taken to Fosen Yard at Trondheim, Norway for completion. In March 2023 she was renamed Rusadir for a six-month charter to Baleària of Spain.

== History ==
Rusadir in Málaga, Spain

Brittany Ferries ordered the vessel, originally named Honfleur, in June 2017 from German shipbuilder Flensburger Schiffbau-Gesellschaft (FSG) at a cost of about €200 million. Construction began in March 2018 when the first steel was cut, followed by the laying of the keel several months later. She was launched in December 2018, and following fitting out was scheduled to be delivered in May 2019 before entering service the following winter season. Once in service, she was to sail between Portsmouth, England and Caen, France.

The completion of construction and fitting out of Honfleur was delayed by several years, and she was still unfinished, with up to a year estimated to remain until delivery, when Brittany Ferries canceled their order for the ship in June 2020. According to FSG, the incomplete vessel was under the shipyard's ownership at the time, leaving her fate unclear. Subsequently it was reported that, as part of the restructuring of the shipyard, the unfinished ferry would be acquired by the former owner of FSG, Siem Industries, possibly for completion elsewhere. On 25 October 2020, the former Honfleur (now simply known as FSG 774 after the cancellation) was towed out of the FSG shipyard by two tugs, the Svitzer Thor and Carlo Martello. She was taken to the Fosen Yard near Trondheim, Norway, which was tasked with finishing the cancelled vessel, after which she was to either be chartered or sold on to another operator. Upon completion, she was laid up in Poland awaiting an operator.

In late February 2023, the Spanish ferry company Baleària chartered the ship for six months, with options to purchase, for their Málaga–Melilla route, and on 1 March she was renamed Rusadir, the Phoenician name for Melilla. In May, Rusadir commenced service.

== Design ==
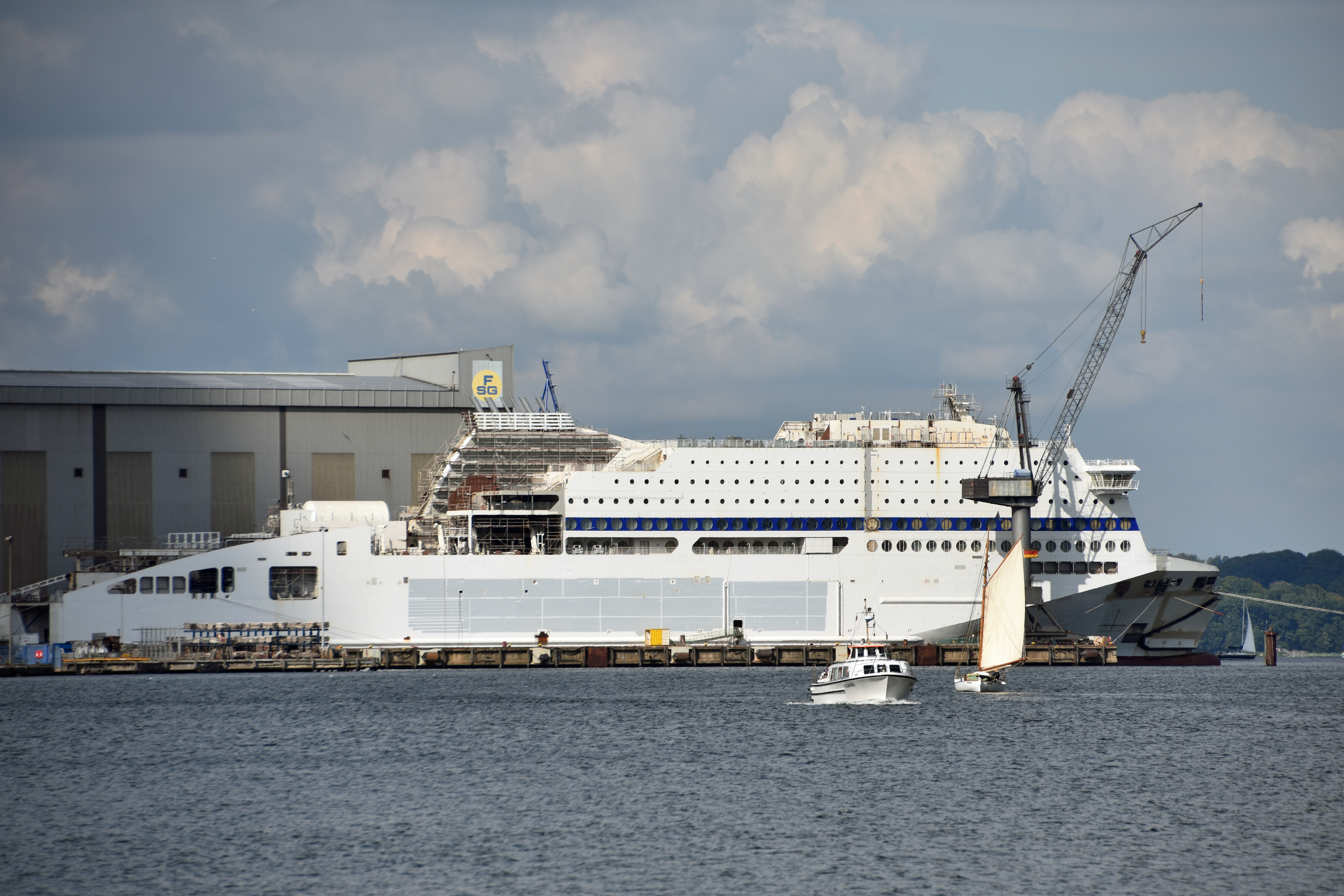
Rusadir under construction at FSG, wearing the blue stripe of former intended operator Brittany Ferries

Rusadir measures 42,400 GT, with a length of 187.4 metres (615 ft), a beam of 31 metres (102 ft), and a draft of 6.6 metres (22 ft). She can carry up to 1,680 passengers, with 261 individual cabins, and has a 2,600 lane meter freight deck, with a capacity of 130 freight trucks, or 550 passenger cars and 64 trucks. The ship is fitted with integrated electric propulsion, with four liquefied natural gas engines, with an output of about 30,000 kilowatts (40,000 hp), driving electrical generators that power two propellers, giving her a 22 knots (25 mph) service speed.
