= SuperRunner Jet II =

Greek owned HSC

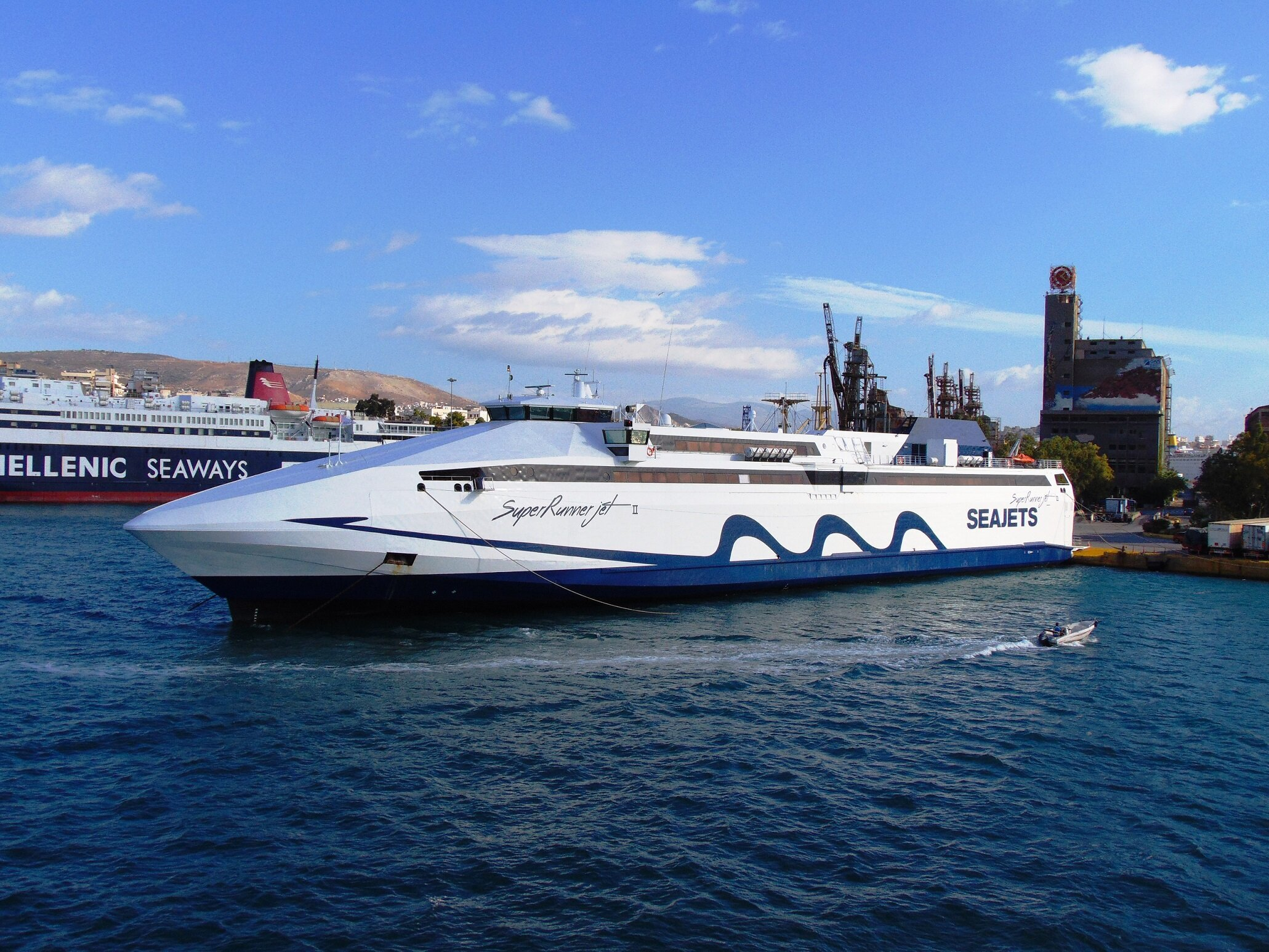
- SuperRunner Jet II in Piraeus

History
- Name: Gotland (1999–2003); HSC Gotlandia (2003–2006); Gotlandia (2006–2023); SuperRunner Jet II (2023–present)
- Owner: Rederi AB Gotland (1999–2023); Seajets (2023–present)
- Operator: Destination Gotland (1999–2023); Seajets (2023–present)
- Port of registry: Limassol, Cyprus
- Builder: Alstom Leroux Naval, France
- Yard number: 822
- Launched: 1999
- Completed: 1999
- Identification: IMO number: 9171163; MMSI: 210423000; Call sign: 5BEM6
- Status: In service

General characteristics
- Type: HSC monohull ferry
- Tonnage: 5,632 GT
- Length: 112.1 m (367 ft 9 in)
- Beam: 16.1 m (52 ft 10 in)
- Draft: 2.7 m (8 ft 10 in)
- Propulsion: 4 × Ruston 20RK270 diesel engines
- Speed: 35 knots (65 km/h; 40 mph) (max)
- Capacity: 700 passengers; 140 cars

SuperRunner Jet II is a ferry belonging to the Greek shipping company Seajets. The fast ferry, the first ordered by Rederi AB Gotland, was built at the Chantiers Alstom Leroux Nava shipyard in Saint-Malo, France, under the name Gotland and delivered on 21 February 1999 to the subsidiary Destination Gotland in the port of Visby.

== Service ==
On 1 April it then began service on the connections between the Gotlandic port and Nynäshamn, operating also between the island and Oskarshamn in the summer period. Over the years, the ferry continued to regularly serve the two routes, but began to operate exclusively in the summer period from 2003, following the entry into service of the new Visby. Finally, on 7 October 2003, with the delivery of the new Gotland, which took place the following day, it was renamed Gotlandia.

On 6 July 2006, with the entry into service of the new Gotlandia II, Gotlandia was placed in reserve, returning to service only during the high season or as a replacement for other units of the fleet during their maintenance periods. However, on 15 January 2007, during a lay-up period in Fårösund, the ferry suffered serious structural damage during a storm, including a hole in the hull, which was later repaired in the Falkenberg shipyards, where she remained until 18 April. A few weeks later, on 20 June, the ferry was then put on the new connections between Visby and Grankullavik, Finland, active only in the summer period, continuing however to operate occasionally as a replacement or support for Gotlandia II. In the 2017 and 2018 summer seasons she operated instead on the connections between Visby and Västervik, in competition with Viking FSTR.

On 21 June 2018, with the cancellation of the connection between the island of Gotland and Finland, the ferry was laid up in Visby and put up for sale, remaining there for the following four years, interrupted only by a stopover between April and April 2018 in Västervik. However, after almost five years of layup, on 25 February 2023 it was purchased by Seajets, from which it was taken over on 8 March and renamed SuperRunner Jet II. Following this, on 3 April the ferry left Sweden for the shipyards of Chalkida, where it underwent major renovation and refitting works, after which on 13 July it initially started service on the routes between Piraeus, Mykonos, Paros, and Naxos, being transferred shortly afterwards to the routes between Lavrion, Ceos, Kythnos, Syros, Tinos, Andros, Paros, Naxos, Ios, Sikinos, Folegandros, Kimolos, Milos, Sifnos, and Seriphos, replacing Sporades Star, which was under repair following its grounding at Syros.

In 2024 the ferry was transferred to the connections between Piraeus, Milos, and Chania, before being moved again to the Cyclades in 2025, between Piraeus, Kythnos, Serifos, Sifnos, and Milos.
