= Kerry (ship) =

Ship built in Italy

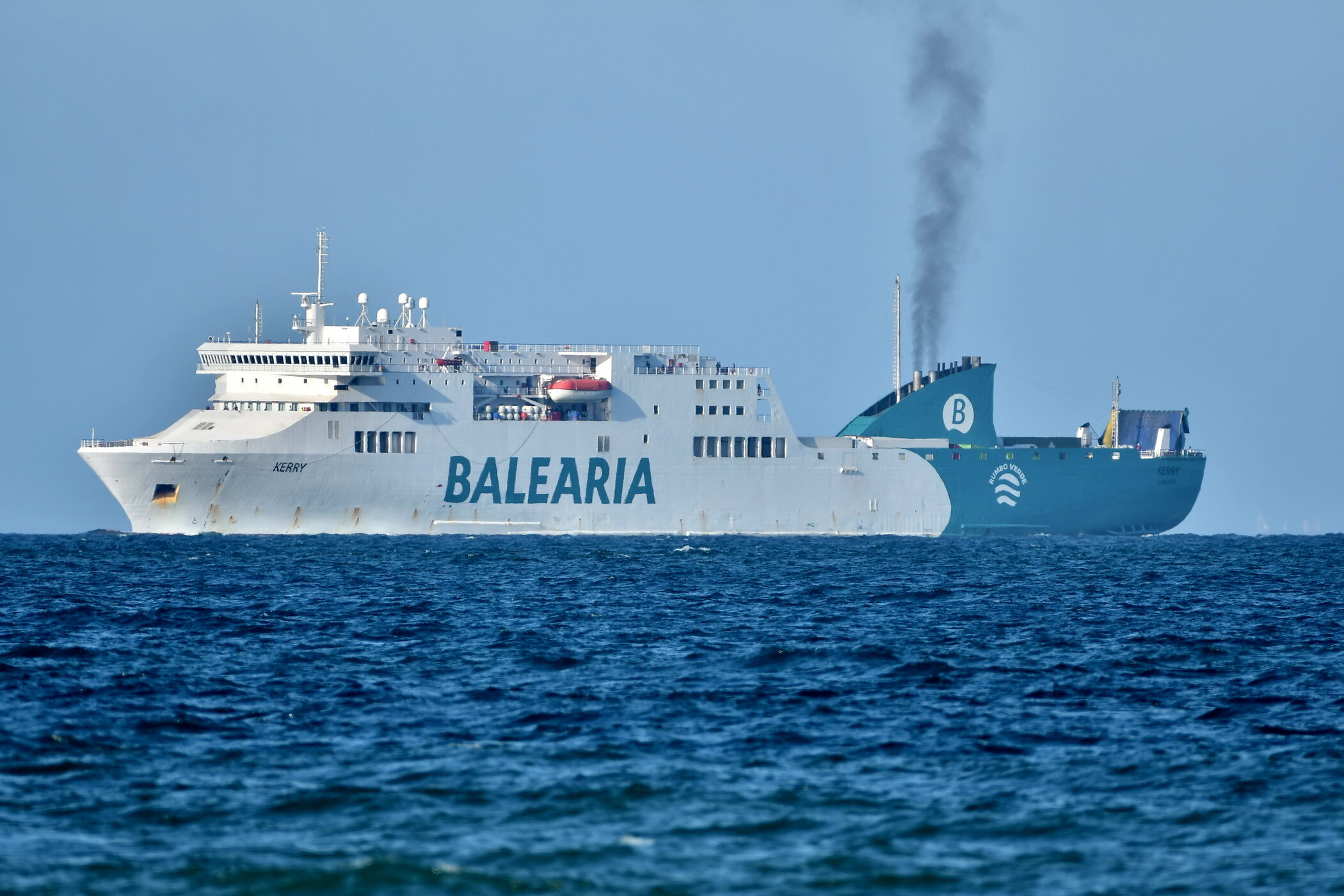
- Kerry in Valencia

History
- Name: 2001–2007: Cartour; 2007: Vinashin Prince; 2007–2014: Hoa Sen; 2014–2017: Stena Egeria; 2017–2019: AF Michela; 2019–present: Kerry
- Owner: 2001–2007: Levantina Trasporti; 2007–2014: Vinashinlines; 2014–present: Stena RoRo
- Operator: 2001–2007: Caronte & Tourist (charter); 2007–2014: Vinashinlines; 2017–2019: Adria Ferries (charter); 2019–2020: Brittany Ferries (charter); 2020–2021: DFDS (charter); 2022–present: Baleària (charter)
- Port of registry: 2001–2007: Reggio Calabria, Italy; 2007–2014: Vietnam; 2014–present: Limassol, Cyprus
- Route: Valencia / Barcelona – Ibiza / Palma de Mallorca; Former: Rosslare – Dunkirk (DFDS); Former: Cork / Rosslare – Santander / Bilbao (Brittany Ferries); Former: Kiel / Karlshamn – Klaipėda (DFDS); Former: Ancona – Durrës (Adria Ferries)
- Ordered: 2000
- Builder: Cantiere Navale Visentini; Porto Viro, Italy
- Yard number: 196
- Laid down: 21 July 2000
- Launched: 8 April 2001
- Completed: 28 September 2001
- Acquired: 2014 (by Stena RoRo)
- Maiden voyage: October 2001
- In service: 2001
- Identification: IMO number: 9243447; Call sign: 5BZF3; MMSI number: 210772000
- Status: in service

General characteristics
- Class & type: Visentini Class Ro-Pax (NAOS 172)
- Tonnage: 24,418 GT; 7,325 NT; 7,380 DWT
- Length: 186.50 m (611 ft 11 in)
- Beam: 25.60 m (84 ft 0 in)
- Draft: 6.50 m (21 ft 4 in)
- Decks: 7
- Ramps: Stern vehicle loading ramp
- Installed power: 2 × MAN-B&W 9L48/60 main diesel engines (total 18,900 kW)
- Propulsion: 2 × controllable pitch propellers
- Speed: 22.0 knots (40.7 km/h; 25.3 mph)
- Capacity: 1,000 passengers; 2,040 lane metres for vehicles (~120 trailers)
- Crew: 35–50

Kerry is a 186.5-metre Ro-Pax ferry built in 2001 by Cantiere Navale Visentini in Porto Viro, Italy. Constructed to the NAOS 172 design, she is owned by Stena RoRo and has operated on long-term charters for several major European operators, including Caronte & Tourist, Brittany Ferries, DFDS, and Baleària. Notably, in January 2021, she was one of the primary vessels deployed by DFDS to launch their direct freight route between Rosslare, Ireland, and Dunkirk, France, bypassing post-Brexit customs corridors.

== Characteristics ==
The ferry, purpose-built to transport a large number of heavy vehicles, is approximately 186 meters long and 24 meters wide and can carry a maximum of 350 passengers, 75 cars, and 156 trailers, or alternatively, 2,030 linear meters of cargo. Powered by two MAN -B&W diesel engines, generating a maximum power of 18,900kW, it can reach a top speed of 24 knots .

== Service ==
The ferry, the first of a series of four sister units, was launched on 8 April 2001 at the Visentini shipyard in Porto Viro with the name Cartour for the Sicilian company Caronte Spa, to which it was transferred on charter for delivery on 28 September of the following year, through its subsidiary Levantina Trasporti. On 7 October, the new ferry began service on the new connections between Messina and Salerno, inaugurating the new brand "Cartour", which still operates the route today.

On 9 October 2007 the ferry was sold to the Vietnamese Ocean Shipping and, renamed Vinashin Prince, was transferred to South-East Asia, being replaced in the connections between Campania and Sicily by the Maria Grazia On., at the same time chartered by Moby Lines. Once in Asia, in December it was renamed Hoa Sen and took service on the connections between Ho Chi Minh and Haiphong. However, the connection proved to be a failure due to mismanagement by the company and, faced with a large deficit, it was cancelled after just 39 crossings.

In May 2014, after a long period of lay-up, it was sold to Stena RoRo and, renamed Stena Egeria, in July, after a series of works necessary to make the ferry operational again, it was chartered to the Chinese Yantai Bohai International Ferry, for which it took service on the connections between Yantai and Pyeongtaek, where it operated until June 2017. Once the Chinese charter ended, on 15 August the ferry arrived in Perama, where it was laid up awaiting further employment. In the same month it was chartered to Adria Ferriesand, renamed AF Michela for the occasion, it took service for the Italian company on the connections between Ancona and Durazzo replacing the Bridge, which at the same time returned to the European Seaways fleet at the end of the charter.

On 1 October 2019, in view of the entry into service of the new AF Claudia, the ferry, having completed its two-year charter to Adria Ferries, was transferred to the Viktor Lenac shipyard in Rijeka, where, in the same month, it was transferred under the Brittany Ferries flag, in view of a new charter deployment, this time between France and Ireland. Renamed Kerry, it entered service on 31 October on the Santander - Cork connections replacing the Connemara. Subsequently, the Spanish port was moved to Bilbao and a further port was added in France, in Roscoff.

In October 2020, at the end of the charter to the French company, the ferry returned to the Stena RoRo fleet for about a month, until, the following month, it was chartered to the Danish DFDS, being used on the connections between Klaipėda and Kiel and, for a few days in December, on those between the Lithuanian port and Karlshamn. In January it was transferred to the new connections between Dunkirk and Rosslare, where it operated in pair with the Visborg until 29 September, when it returned to serve the route between Lithuania and Germany.

On 24 January 2022, after approximately a year and a half of service for DFDS, the ferry returned to its owner company, being laid up in Setubal, again awaiting deployment. In February it was then chartered to the Spanish Baleària, for which it entered service on 16 February on the connections between Barcelona, Ibiza and Palma de Mallorca.

== Sister ships ==
- Napoles
- Sicilia
- AF Claudia
