= AF Claudia =

Ferry built in Italy

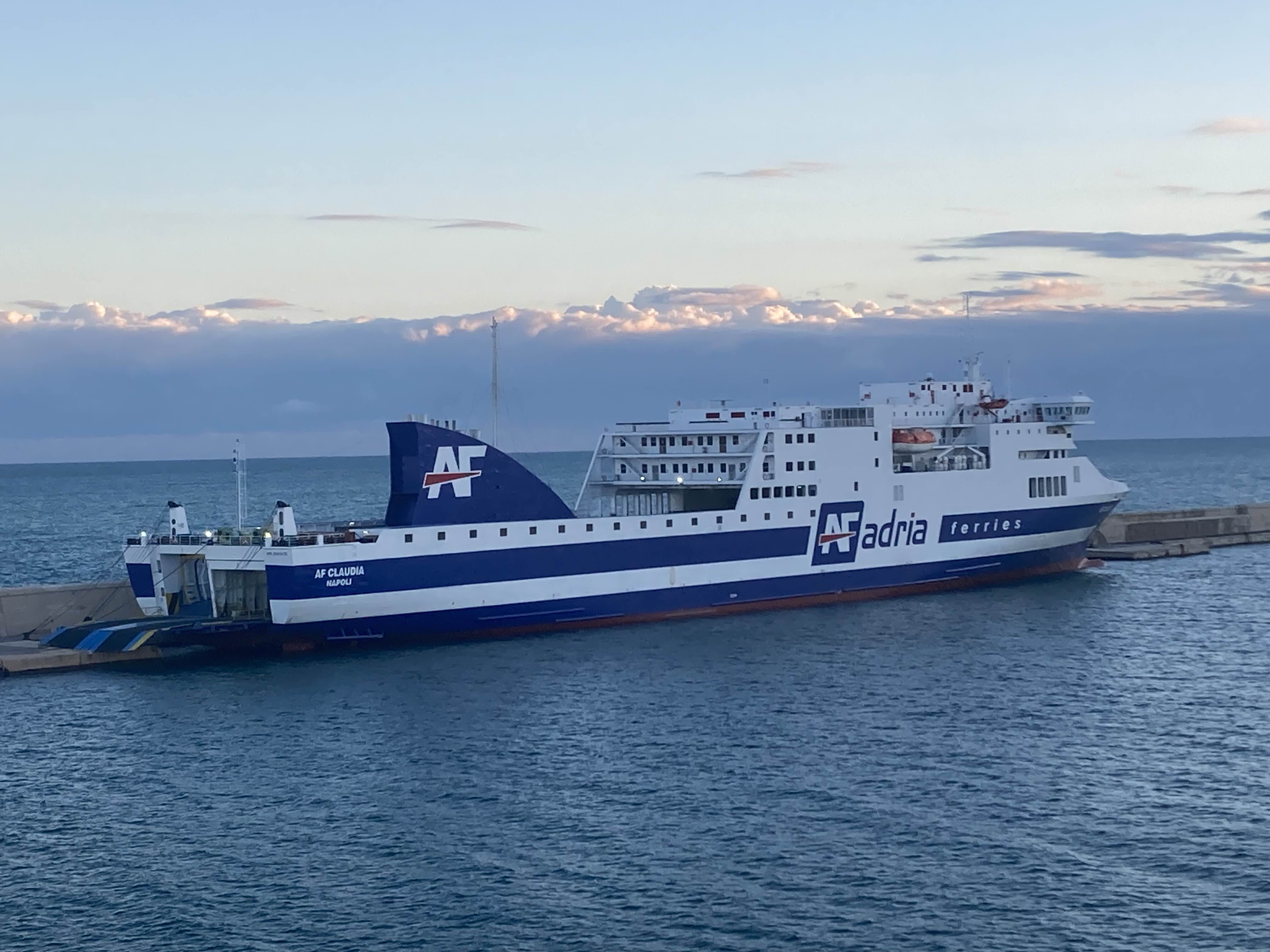
- AF Claudia in Bari

History
- Name: 2001–2003: Stena Forwarder; 2003–2019: California Star; 2019–present: AF Claudia
- Owner: 2001–2003: Stena Line; 2003–2019: Baja Ferries; 2019–present: Adria Ferries
- Operator: 2001–2003: Stena Line; 2003–2019: Baja Ferries; 2019–present: Adria Ferries; 2019: Grimaldi Lines (charter); 2020: Grandi Navi Veloci (charter); 2024: DFDS (charter); 2024–2025: Superfast Ferries / Attica Group (charter); 2025: Africa Morocco Link (charter)
- Port of registry: 2001–2003: London, United Kingdom; 2003–2019: La Paz, Mexico; 2019–present: Bari / Naples, Italy
- Route: Ancona / Bari – Durrës; Former: Patras / Igoumenitsa – Venice (Superfast); Former: Algeciras – Tangier Med (AML); Former: Civitavecchia – Olbia (Grimaldi); Former: La Paz – Topolobampo / Mazatlán; Former: Holyhead – Dublin
- Ordered: 2000
- Builder: Cantiere Navale Visentini; Porto Viro, Italy
- Yard number: 197
- Laid down: 2000
- Launched: 2001
- Completed: October 2001
- Acquired: 2019 (by Adria Ferries)
- Maiden voyage: October 2001
- In service: 2001
- Identification: IMO number: 9243435; Call sign: IBAC; MMSI number: 247391700
- Status: in service

General characteristics
- Class & type: Visentini Class Ro-Pax (NAOS 172)
- Tonnage: 24,418 GT; 7,325 NT; 7,380 DWT
- Length: 186.49 m (611 ft 10 in)
- Beam: 25.60 m (84 ft 0 in)
- Draft: 6.50 m (21 ft 4 in)
- Decks: 7
- Ramps: Stern vehicle loading ramp
- Installed power: 2 × MAN-B&W 9L48/60 main diesel engines (total 18,900 kW)
- Propulsion: 2 × controllable pitch propellers
- Speed: 22.0 knots (40.7 km/h; 25.3 mph)
- Capacity: 950 passengers; 2,044 lane metres for vehicles
- Crew: 30–45

AF Claudia is a 186.49-metre Ro-Pax ferry built in 2001 by Cantiere Navale Visentini in Porto Viro, Italy. Built as Stena Forwarder, she was operated under names like California Star for Baja Ferries before being acquired by Adria Ferries. Currently operating under the Italian flag, she mainly connects Italy and Albania on routes such as Ancona–Durrës and Bari–Durrës.

== Service ==
The ferry, launched on 28 October 2000 at the Visentini shipyard in Porto Viro with the name Stena Forwarder, was delivered in April 2001 to the subsidiary Visemar di Navigazione, from which it was immediately chartered to Stena Line, for which it entered service on 27 April on the routes between Dublin and Holyhead as a replacement for the Stena Challenger. On 24 April 2002, while mooring in Dublin, she collided with the quay. As a result, the ferry was taken out of service for necessary repairs.

On 14 April 2003, following the termination of the charter contract by Stena Line the previous day, she was chartered to the newly formed Baja Ferries, by which she was renamed California Star. Transferred to Mexico, she subsequently took service on the Topolobampo to La Paz routes. In April 2007, after four years of charter, she was purchased outright by the Mexican company. On 6 June 2019, with the return of the Baja Star to the fleet, it was sold to Adria Ferries, from which it was renamed AF Claudia. However, the ferry did not initially take service for the Ancona-based company, but rather, from 7 July to 22 September, it was chartered to Grimaldi Lines, operating on behalf of the latter on the connections between Civitavecchia and Olbia.

Once the charter ended, it was transferred to the shipyard in Rijeka, where it wore the Adria Ferries livery. Once the works were completed, on 18 November it then took service on the connections between Ancona and Durrës replacing the AF Michela, which at the same time returned to the Stena Line fleet at the end of the charter.

On 6 March 2024, following the commissioning of the AF Mia, she was laid up awaiting deployment. A few days later, on 15 March, she was chartered to DFDS, for which she operated until 7 May on the Dunkirk - Rosslare routes as a replacement for the Optima Seaways. After the charter ended, on 14 May she was transferred to Durrës. On 31 May 2024 she was chartered to Superfast Ferries, for which she took service on the connections between Venice, Igoumenitsa and Patras. On 24 April 2025, a 47-year-old Greek seafarer was hit and killed by a truck while disembarking in Patras.

In June 2025 it was chartered to Africa Morocco Link, for which it took service on the connections between Algeciras and Tangier Med. Once the charter ended, on 10 September it was then transferred to the shipyard in Yalova. At the end of the Turkish stopover it then returned to Italy, where it resumed service on the connections between Bari and Durazzo as a replacement for the AF Francesca, laid up in Albania during the winter period.

== Sister ships ==
- Napoles
- Sicilia
- Kerry
