= Clipper Navigation =

Ferry operator in Washington, United States and British Columbia, Canada

FRS Clipper Navigation Inc.
- Type: Private
- Founded: 1986
- Headquarters: Seattle, Washington
- Parent: FRS Group
- Website: clippervacations.com

Clipper Navigation, Inc., is an American ferry operator and subsidiary of Förde Reederei Seetouristik based in Seattle, Washington. They provide multiple transportation and vacation packages—many of which are offered under the name Clipper Vacations—including hotel and tour packages in Seattle and in Victoria, British Columbia, and Vancouver, British Columbia.

The company operates the Victoria Clipper, a passenger ferry service between downtown Seattle and the Inner Harbour in downtown Victoria.

== History ==
Clipper Navigation, Inc., was founded in 1986 with the original MV Victoria Clipper I on the Seattle/Victoria route. The MV Clipper II was actually two different boats that ran to the San Juan Islands. Then the MV Victoria Clipper III (now MV San Juan Clipper) was purchased. The service between Seattle and Friday Harbor, Washington provides orca and gray whale watching out of that port and has been in operation since 1991 daily from mid-May through September. As Clipper Navigation grew, it launched Clipper Vacations.

In 2009, Clipper Navigation partnered with the state of Washington and allowed the installation of oceanographic sensors on the passenger ferry Victoria Clipper IV to gather data about the Puget Sound.

German navigation company Förde Reederei Seetouristik (FRS) acquired Clipper Vacations in 2016. FRS announced plans to expand the company's service to include routes between Victoria and Vancouver, and between Florida and Cuba.

== Fleet ==
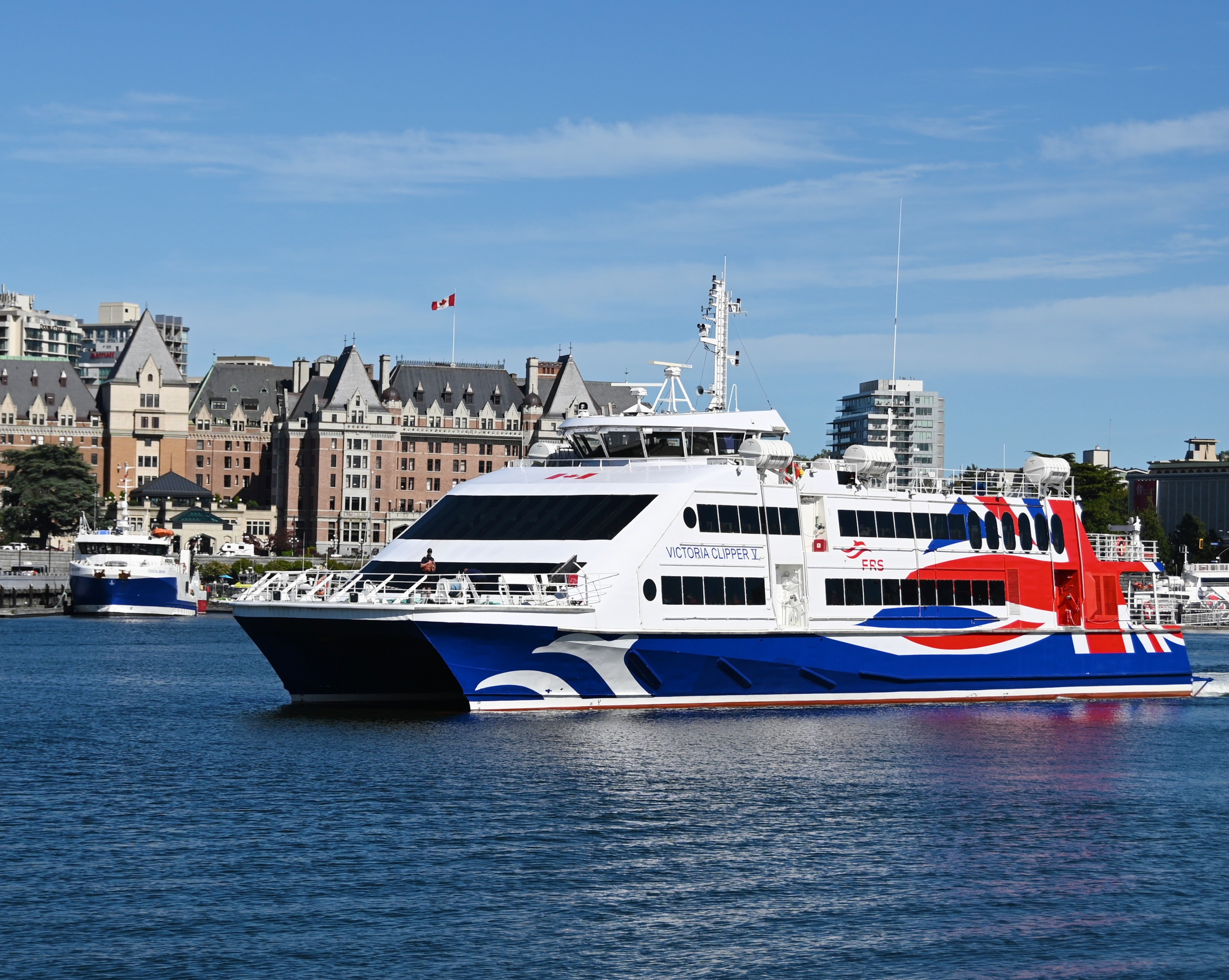
MV Victoria Clipper V.

The Clipper fleet currently consists of two high-speed catamarans, the MV Victoria Clipper V and the MV Emerald Clipper that serve Seattle, Victoria, and Friday Harbor. FRS Clipper Navigation introduced a new whale watching vessel to replace the MV San Juan Clipper. The new vessel was christened on April 16, 2026 and is currently in service. The Emerald Clipper was designed by One2Three Naval Architects in Sydney, Australia, and built by Mavrik Manrine Inc, in La Conner, Washington. The Clipper fleet includes one of the fastest passenger vessels in the western hemisphere.

Clipper Navigation was also responsible for operating the MV Princess Marguerite III, a car ferry between Seattle and Victoria. Its operation was ended in 1999 due to the extremely high costs associated with the six-hour trip between ports. Currently, there is no car service between Seattle and Victoria. The primary choice for passengers with cars is the MV Coho ferry out of Port Angeles. The Washington State Ferry from Anacortes, Washington to Sidney, British Columbia to Victoria was discontinued. The WSF announced that they don't anticipate being able to return the Sidney run to service until 2030. Clipper Vacations can book passengers who wish to take the Coho in conjunction with a hotel stay. The Clipper also ran the MV Victoria Clipper I, and the MV Victoria Clipper IV.

== Operations ==
The Clipper has one daily round-trip ferry service that travels between Pier 69 in downtown Seattle and downtown Victoria, taking approximately 2 hours and 45 minutes. The MV Victoria Clipper carries 525 passengers.

Clipper Vacations provides hotel and tour packages in Victoria, Seattle and Vancouver.

In 2025, CEO Mark Collins reported that ridership was decreasing due to tensions between Canada and the US, causing the company to decrease the number of roundtrip ferries per week.
