= Hansa Destinations =

Swedish ferry-line

Hansa Destinations AB
- Headquarters: Sweden
- Area served: Sweden and Germany
- Services: Passenger transportation, Freight transportation
- Parent: Rederi AB Gotland
- Website: www.hansadestinations.com

Hansa Destinations is a Swedish ferry line that runs ferries from Nynäshamn and Visby in Sweden to Rostock in Germany. It is a wholly owned daughter company of Rederi AB Gotland. The fleet consists of one ferry.

== Destinations ==
- Gotland, Sweden
- Nynäshamn, Sweden,
- Rostock, Germany
