= Fares 2 =

Catamaran launched in 1996

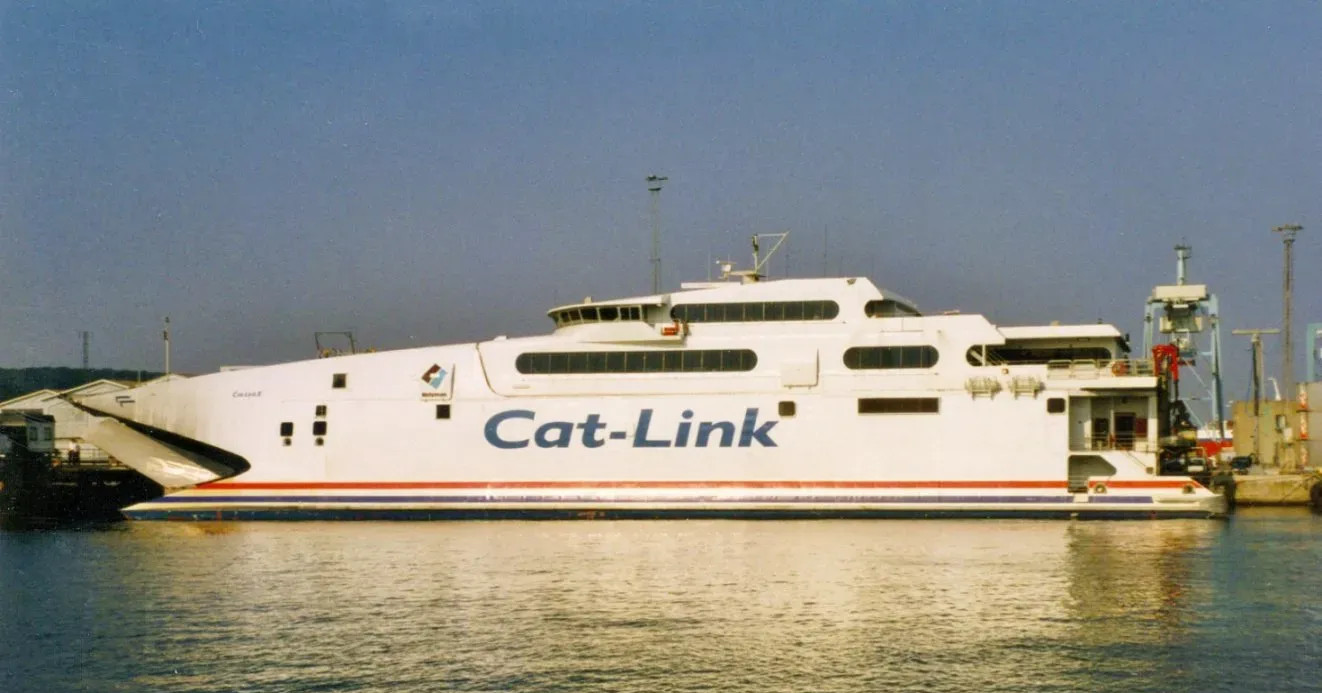
- Fares 2 as Cat-Link II in Aarhus

History
- Name: 1994–1995: Condor 11; 1995–1998: Cat-Link II; 1998–1999: Euroferrys I; 1999–2002: Euroferrys Primero; 2002: CatlinkII; 2002: Cat-Link II; 2002–2005: Elanora; 2005 onwards: Fares 2
- Owner: 1994–2002: Holyman; 2002–2005: CBA Asia; 2005–2007: El Salam Maritime Transport; 2007-present: Maritime Company for Navigation (MACNA)
- Operator: 1995: Condor Ferries; 1995–1998: Cat-Link; 1998–2002: Euroferrys; 2004–2005: Jetlink; 2005–2007: El Salam Maritime; 2007-present: Maritime Company for Navigation (MACNA)
- Builder: Incat, Tasmania
- Yard number: 034
- Launched: 21 July 1994
- Identification: IMO number: 9106091
- Status: In service

General characteristics
- Length: 77.46 m (254 ft 2 in)
- Beam: 26.00 m (85 ft 4 in)
- Draught: 3.50 m (11 ft 6 in)
- Installed power: 4 × Ruston 16-cylinder 16RK270 High Efficiency Marine Diesel Engines
- Propulsion: 4 × Lips 115DLX waterjets
- Speed: 36 knots (67 km/h; 41 mph)
- Capacity: 600 passengers; 50 vehicles

Fares 2 is a high-speed catamaran operated by Saudi Arabian ferry operator Maritime Company for Navigation (MACNA). She was launched on 21 July 1994.

== Construction ==
Fares 2 was built in 1994 by Incat in Australia as Condor 11, and is one of a series of wave-piercing catamarans to be constructed by the company.

== Service ==
=== 1995: Condor Ferries ===
Following a period of repairs after a crash during sea trials, Condor 11 entered service in May 1995 operating between England and the Channel Islands. Condor Ferries was at this time 50% owned by Holyman whose 50% shareholding had been acquired by predecessor company; Thomas Nationwide Transport in 1992. Her time in operation with Condor was short lived, coming to an end in October 1995.

=== 1995–1998: Cat-Link ===
Renamed Cat-Link II she was quickly transferred into the operations of another Holyman subsidiary; Cat-Link in which they held 75%. During her Cat-Link service, she operated on the Aarhus - Kalundborg route.

=== 1998–2002: Euroferrys ===
In 1998 Holyman chartered the vessel on a four-year charter to Spanish operator; Euroferrys. She was firstly renamed Euroferrys I, on entry into service, though was later renamed again as Euroferrys Primero. After the charter ended in 2002 Holyman sold her to CBA Asia and she was laid up awaiting future service, during which time she was renamed again as Elanora.

=== 2004–2005: Jetlink ===
Whilst chartered to Norwegian startup company; Jetlink in 2004, with a proposed renaming to Jetlink Express, her proposed entry into service originally planned for September 2004 was delayed firstly to November, then December and then again until March 2005. Ultimately even this date was missed for unknown reasons and she never entered service for the company, and indeed the company never commenced operations.

=== 2005–2007: El Salam Maritime ===
After the failure to launch of Jetlink, the vessel was purchased by Egyptian ferry operator El Salam Maritime. El Salam at that time transported over one million passengers a year and was one of the largest private shipping companies in the Middle East. They renamed the vessel Fares 2, however El Salam gained considerable unwanted media attention shortly after, in 2006 after the sinking of the al-Salam Boccaccio 98 in the Red Sea, with the loss of over 1000 lives.

=== 2007–present: Maritime Company for Navigation (MACNA) ===
Fares 2 came under the ownership of the Saudi Arabian company; Maritime Company for Navigation, also known by its initials MACNA, in February 2007.

== Accidents and incidents ==
- On 9 October 1994 Condor 11 was on sea trials off Tasmania and travelling at 36 knots (67 km/h; 41 mph) under the command of Incat managing director Bob Clifford when she struck Black Jack Reef some 12 miles (19 km) off Hobart.
- On 13 March 1997 Cat-Link II collided in Kalundborg Fjord with a fishing boat, Lissi, sinking her, with the crew being rescued and brought aboard Cat-Link II.
