= Ventouris Ferries =

Ferry companies of Greece

- Founded: 1978
- Headquarters: Piraeus, Greece
- Area served: Adriatic Sea
- Services: Passenger transportation, Freight transportation
- Website: ventourisferries.com

Ventouris Ferries is a Greek company that operates ferry services from Italy to Greece and Albania.

== Routes ==
Ventouris Ferries operates four routes across the Adriatic Sea.

- Bari - Durrës (Rigel II & Rigel III, Rigel V & Rigel VII)
- Bari - Igoumenitsa (Rigel VII) *summer season*
- Bari - Corfu - Igoumenitsa (Rigel V & Rigel VII) *summer season*
- Bari - Corfu - Igoumenitsa - Sami (Rigel VII) *summer season*

== Fleet ==
Ventouris Ferries currently operates a fleet of four RORO ferries.

Ship	Flag	Built	Entered service	Gross Tonnage	Length	Breadth	Passengers	Vehicles	Speed	Image
Rigel II	Cyprus	1980	2015	23.842 GRT	146,1 m	25,5 m	1.800	500	20 knots	
Rigel III	Cyprus	1979	2017	16.405 GRT	136,1 m	24,2 m	1.550	450	19 knots	
Rigel VII	Cyprus	1994	2020	21.646 GRT	163,5 m	25,6 m	1.500	450	22,5 knots	
Rigel V	Cyprus	1992	2025	25.323 GRT	174,8 m	25 m	1.030	500	27 knots	

=== Former ships ===
Ship	Years of service
Captain Constantinos	1978–1981
Georgios B	1983–1984
Patra Express	1984–1990
Grecia Express	1987–1993
Italia Express	1987
Venus	1989–2003
Ydra	1990–1993
Saturnus	1990–2003
Vega	1990–2004
Pollux	1994–1995
Athens	2003–2010
Siren	2003–2010
Polaris	1991–2011
Seatrade	2008–2011
Rigel I	2008–2021
Bari	2010–2021
