= Paraguana I =

High-speed monohull

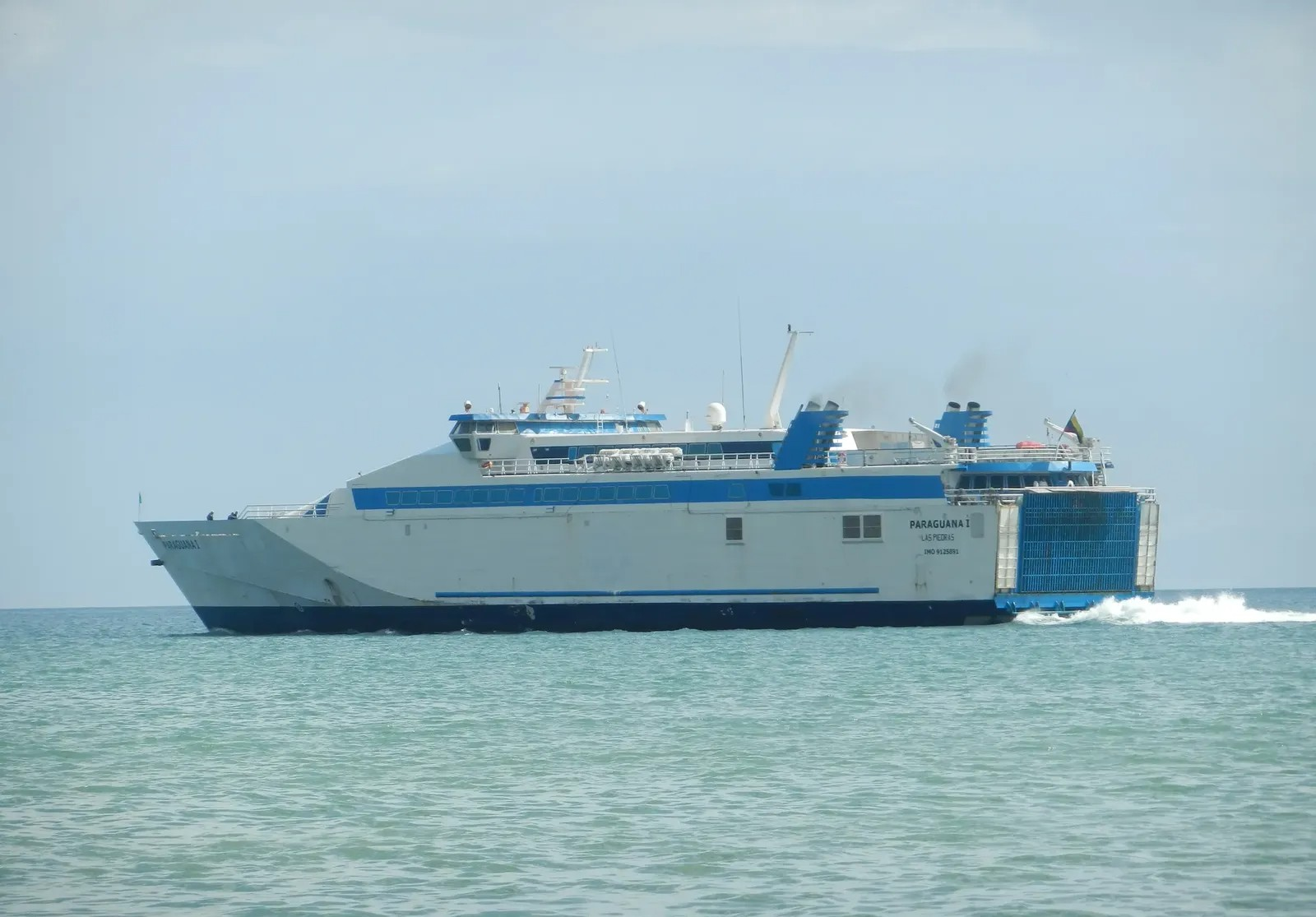
- Paraguana I in Punta de Piedras

History
- Name: (1996): Pegasus One; (1996): Stena Pegasus; (1996–2002): Pegasus One; (2002–2004): St. Matthew; (2004–2007): Tallink Autoexpress 4; (2007–2015): Speedrunner II; (2015–present): Paraguana I
- Owner: (1996–2004): Ocean Bridge Developments S.A.; (2004–2007): Tallink; (2007–2015): Aegean Speed Lines; (2015–present): Naviera Paraguana C.A.
- Operator: (1996): Stena Line (chartered); (1997–1999): Conferry (chartered); (2004–2007): Tallink; (2007–2015): Aegean Speed Lines; (2015–present): Naviera Paraguana / Conferry
- Port of registry: (1996–2002): Brindisi, Italy; (2002–2004): Gibraltar; (2004–2007): Tallinn, Estonia; (2007–2008): Limassol, Cyprus; (2008–2015): Piraeus, Greece; (2015–present): Belize City, Belize / Venezuela
- Route: Puerto La Cruz – Punta de Piedras (Venezuela)
- Builder: Fincantieri; Riva Trigoso, Italy
- Yard number: 5965
- Laid down: 27 June 1995
- Launched: 23 February 1996
- Completed: 29 May 1996
- Maiden voyage: June 1996
- In service: June 1996
- Identification: IMO number: 9125891; Call sign: YYOH; MMSI number: 775992160
- Status: In service

General characteristics
- Class & type: Fincantieri MDV 1200
- Tonnage: 3,971 GT; 405 DWT
- Length: 94.86 m (311 ft 3 in)
- Beam: 16.0 m (52 ft 6 in)
- Draft: 2.89 m (9 ft 6 in)
- Depth: 4.60 m (15 ft 1 in)
- Decks: 5 (2 passenger decks, 2 cargo decks)
- Installed power: 4 × MTU 20V1163 TB73L diesel engines (24,000 kW / 32,630 bhp total)
- Propulsion: 2 × KaMeWa waterjets
- Speed: 36.0 knots (66.7 km/h; 41.4 mph) (service) 40.0 knots (74.1 km/h; 46.0 mph) (max)
- Capacity: 580 passengers; 173 cars
- Crew: 22
- Notes: Sister ship to Fertiti

Paraguana I is a high-speed passenger and vehicle roll-on/roll-off ferry owned by the Venezuelan operator Naviera Paraguana. Built in 1996 by Fincantieri as the pioneering MDV 1200-class fast ferry Pegasus One, she operated on charter across northern Europe and South America. Between 2007 and 2015, the vessel served as a mainstay of Greek island transport under the name Speedrunner II, before returning permanently to Caribbean service.

== Service ==
The ferry, the first of a class of two sister ships and part of a series of six high-speed vessels built by Fincantieri, was launched on 23 February 1996 at the Riva Trigoso shipyard as Pegasus One and delivered on 29 May to the Brindisi-based company Ocean Bridge Developments. From there, she was immediately chartered out on a bareboat basis to Stena Line, changing her name to Stena Pegasus and taking service on the Newhaven - Dieppe route in the English Channel. At the end of her charter, the ferry was laid up in Le Havre on 27 October and renamed Pegasus One again. She remained in France until May 1997, when, chartered by the Venezuelan company Conferry, she set sail for South America, where she took service on 15 July on the Puerto La Cruz -Punta de Piedras route on the island of Margarita. At the end of this second charter, on 31 July 1999, after two years in service in Venezuela, the ferry returned to Europe, being laid up in Eleusis Bay, Greece, due to financial difficulties with the banks. In 2002, again due to financial difficulties, she was registered in Gibraltar and renamed St Matthew and transferred under tow to Gibraltar in December.

In March 2004, after five years of layup, the ferry was purchased by Tallink, by which it was renamed Tallink AutoExpress 4 and towed on 28 March to Estonia, where, after the necessary renovations for its return to service, it was put into service on 5 May 2005 on the Tallinn - Helsinki routes, where it operated alongside its sister ship Tallink AutoExpress 3, Tallink AutoExpress and Tallink AutoExpress 2. However, just two years after her first service in the Gulf of Finland, with the entry into service of the new Star, on 26 March Tallink AutoExpress 4 was sold for eight million euros to the Greek company Aegean Speed Lines, by which she was renamed Speedrunner II and transferred on 26 May to Piraeus, which she started serving in July to the islands of Paros, Naxos, Ios and Santorini and to those of Serifos, Sifnos, Sikinos, Folegandros and Milos. In 2008, due to the sale of her fleetmate Speedrunner I, services were limited to the Western Cyclades, which she operated until the summer of 2009, when following the purchase of her sister ships Speedrunner III and Speedrunner IV, the ferry returned to service again on the routes between Piraeus, Sifnos, Sikinos, Ios and Santorini. At the end of September 2010 it was then chartered to NEL Lines, but never took service for the latter, despite official communications from the Lesbos company, remaining laid up for the whole winter, as usual, with the exception of a trip between Benghazi and Alexandria in Egypt to evacuate refugees from the civil war in Libya in the first months of 2011, which was also the last year in which the ferry operated in Greece, on this occasion on the connections between Santorini and Heraklion.

In December 2015, after three years of decommissioning, which began at the end of the 2011 summer season due to the crisis that hit Greece in those years, the ferry was purchased by Naviera Paraguaná, to which it was delivered in January 2016. Renamed Paraguana I, the ferry did not initially enter service for the South American company, being instead chartered on 13 May to Atlânticoline on behalf of Hellenic Shipping for the summer season, for which it operated from 9 June to September on the routes between Ponta Delgada, Praia da Vitória, Graciosa, Vila do Porto, in the Azores. After the charter ended, the Paraguana I was transferred to Venezuela, where it was supposed to enter service on the routes between Puerto Cabello and Aruba. However, the ferry never entered service for the company, until the latter's acquisition by Conferry, from which it was introduced on the connections between La Guaira and Punta de Piedras on August 23, 2019, as announced by then President Nicolás Maduro on August 2.
