= SuperRunner Jet =

1998 ship

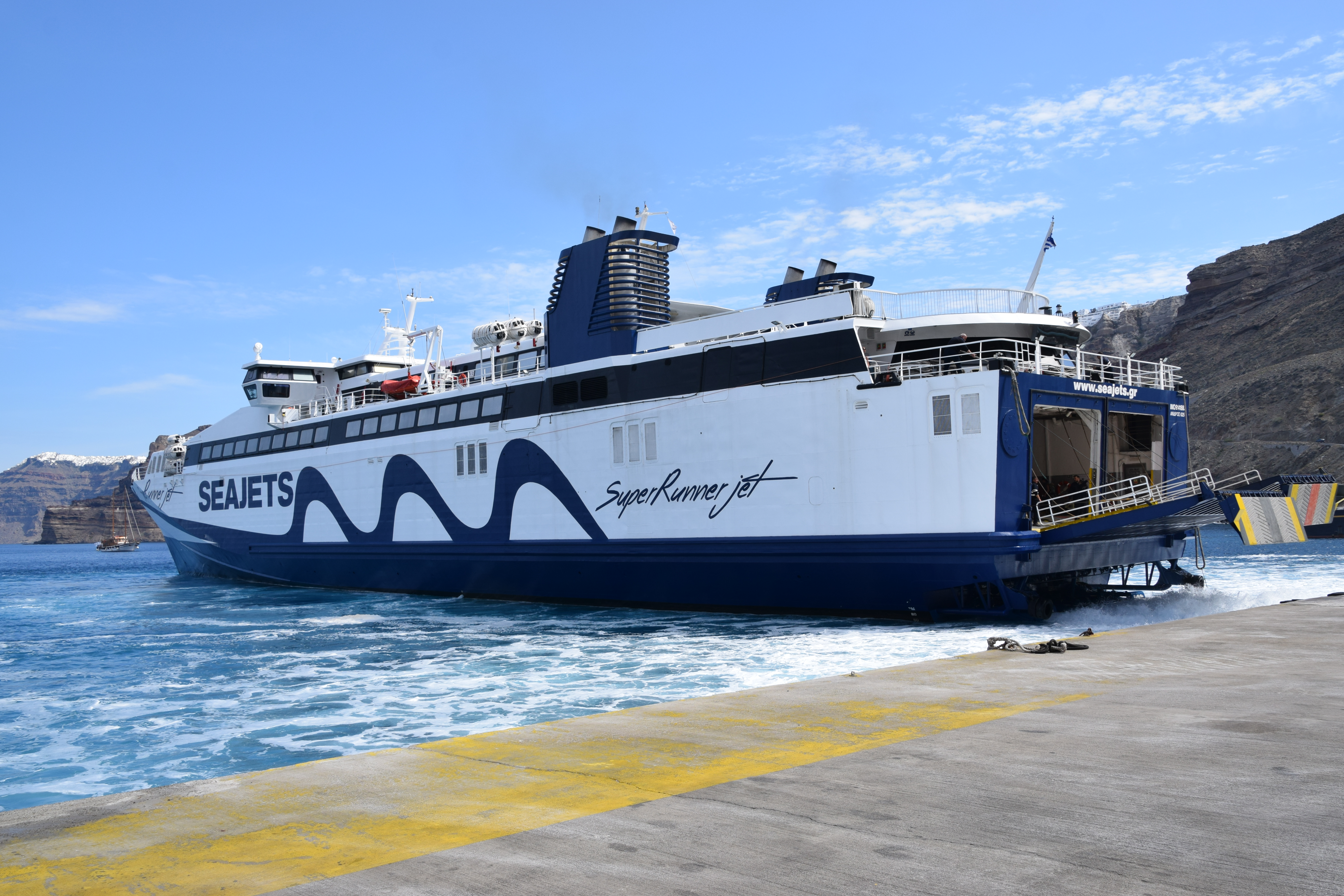
- SuperRunner Jet in Santorini in May 2023

History
- Name: 1999–2009: SuperSeaCat Four; 2009–2016: Speedrunner IV; 2016–2021 Super Runner; 2021–Present: SuperRunner Jet
- Operator: 1999–2000: Laid up; 2000–2006: Silja Line; 2006–2008: SuperSeaCat; 2008–2016: Aegean Speed Lines; 2016–2021: Golden Star Ferries; 2021–Present: Seajets
- Port of registry: 1999–2008: La Spezia, Italy; 2008–Present: Piraeus, Greece
- Builder: Fincantieri, Riva Trigoso, Italy
- Yard number: 6004
- Launched: 16 October 1998
- Acquired: May 1999
- Maiden voyage: 1999
- In service: 17 April 2000
- Identification: IMO number: 9141883
- Status: In service

General characteristics
- Class & type: MDV1200 class fast ferry
- Tonnage: 4,465 GT; 340 DWT
- Length: 100.30 m (329.07 ft)
- Beam: 17.10 m (56.10 ft)
- Draught: 2.60 m (8.53 ft)
- Depth: 10.70 m (35.10 ft)
- Decks: 4 (passenger accessible)
- Installed power: 4 × Ruston V20RK 270
- Propulsion: 4 × KaMeWa 112F11 waterjets; combined 27,500 kW
- Speed: 35 knots (65 km/h) service speed; 40 knots (74 km/h) maximum speed
- Capacity: 710 passengers; 120 cars; 4 busses

SuperRunner Jet is a fast ferry owned and operated by Seajets. She was built in 1999 at Fincantieri, Riva Trigoso, Italy, for Sea Containers, but entered service only in 2000 for Sea Container's subsidiary Silja Line. In 2006 she was transferred to another Sea Containers subsidiary, SuperSeaCat. In 2009 she began service with Aegean Speed Lines between Piraeus, Serifos, Sifnos, Milos, Kimolos, Folegandros and Sikinos, as well as Paros and Naxos. In 2016, she was sold to Golden Star Ferries and renamed it Super Runner. In June 2021 Golden Star Ferries sold to Seajets her ships Superferry II, Superspeed, Supercat and Super Runner. Seajets renamed it Super Runner Jet.

== History ==
SuperSeaCat Four was the fourth and last mono-hulled fast ferry to be built for Sea Containers. Originally it was planned that she would be set in traffic between Brindisi, Italy and Çeşme, Turkey. The plan was abandoned however, and after delivery in May 1999 SuperSeaCat Four was laid up in La Spezia, Italy.

In 1999 Sea Containers acquired the majority of shares in classic Finnish shipping company Silja Line. Silja were at the time operating traditional ferries on the highly lucrative route between Helsinki and Tallinn, the capitals of Finland and Estonia respectively, but had no fast ferries operating on the route. Sea Containers decided to set their extra SuperSeaCat on that route, and from 17 April 2000 onwards SuperSeaCat Four sailed on the route under Silja Line SuperSeaCat brand. Due to the Baltic Sea freezing during winter, the service could not be operated between January and April each year. The ship spent those months laid up. In 2003 Sea Containers added a second SuperSeaCat to the route, SuperSeaCat Three. For the summer season of 2005 a third ship, SuperSeaCat One was added to the service.

In late 2005 Sea Containers decided to sell all of its ferry operations, including the profitable Silja Line. Silja Line was sold to the Estonian ferry operator Tallink, who already operated several fast and conventional ferries between Helsinki and Tallinn. Taking over the SuperSeaCats would have given them a dominant market position on the route. Because of this the SuperSeaCats were branched off from Silja to form a separate company, SuperSeaCat.

In 2008, SuperSeaCat Four was sold to Greek company Aegean Speed Lines, along with her sister ship SuperSeaCat Three. Both ships remained in service between Helsinki and Tallinn. However, in 2009, the company decided to bring both ships to Greek service. The SuperSeaCat Four arrived on June 17, 2009, was renamed Speedrunner IV and began service on her owner's main service: the Piraeus-Serifos-Sifnos-Milos-Kimolos-Folegandros line, which she also served in 2010 and 2011. In 2012, her service was only limited to Serifos, Sifnos and Milos, and in 2013 she was laid-up in Eleusis Bay due to her company's economic difficulties. She returned to service the following year, operating on the Piraeus-Paros-Naxos line for the summer. In 2015 she returned to service in Serifos, Sifnos and Milos, while in 2016 her service was extended to Kimolos, Folegandros and Sikinos.

After the summer of 2016, the Speedrunner IV was sold to Greek company Golden Star Ferries. She is due to enter service with them in 2017, operating from Rafina to the Cyclades islands under her new name, Superrunner. In June 2021 Super Runner sold to Seajets and renamed it Super Runner Jet.

== Gallery ==
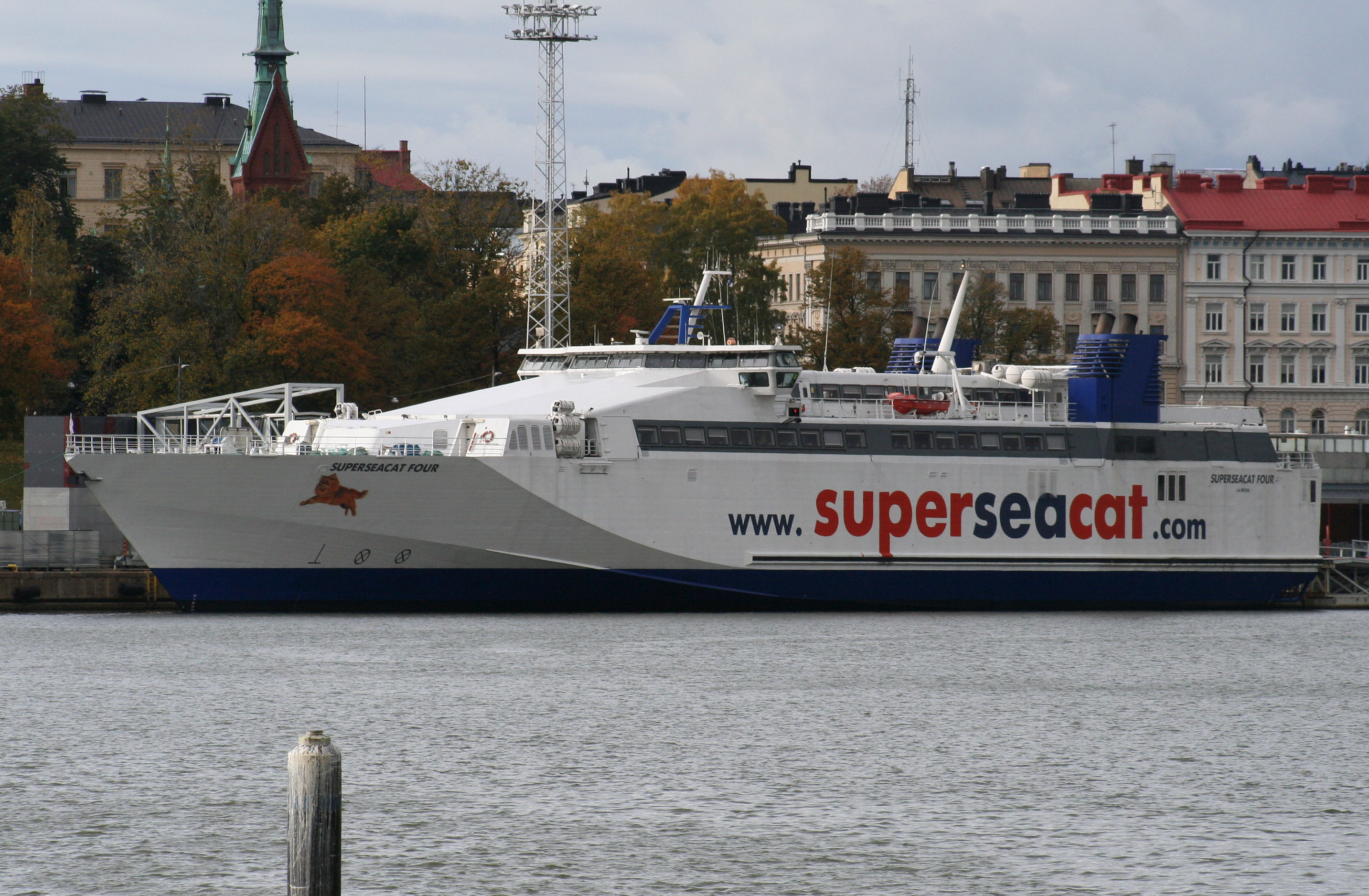
Superseacat Four in Helsinki.

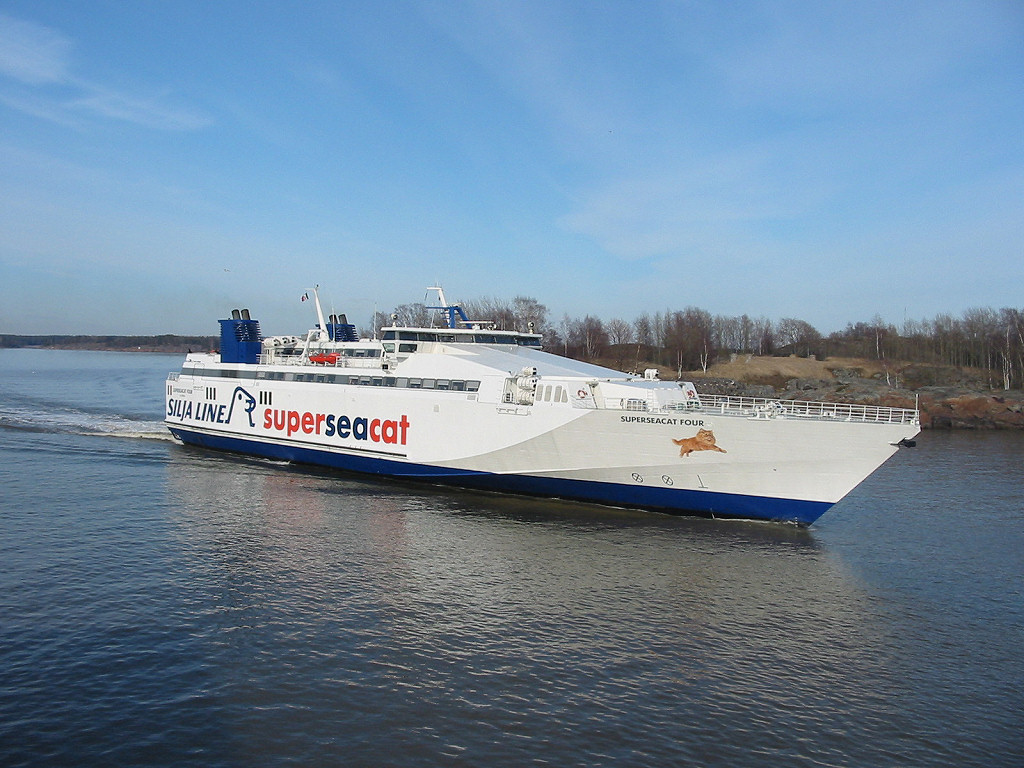
Superseacat Four in the Kustaamiekka Strait.

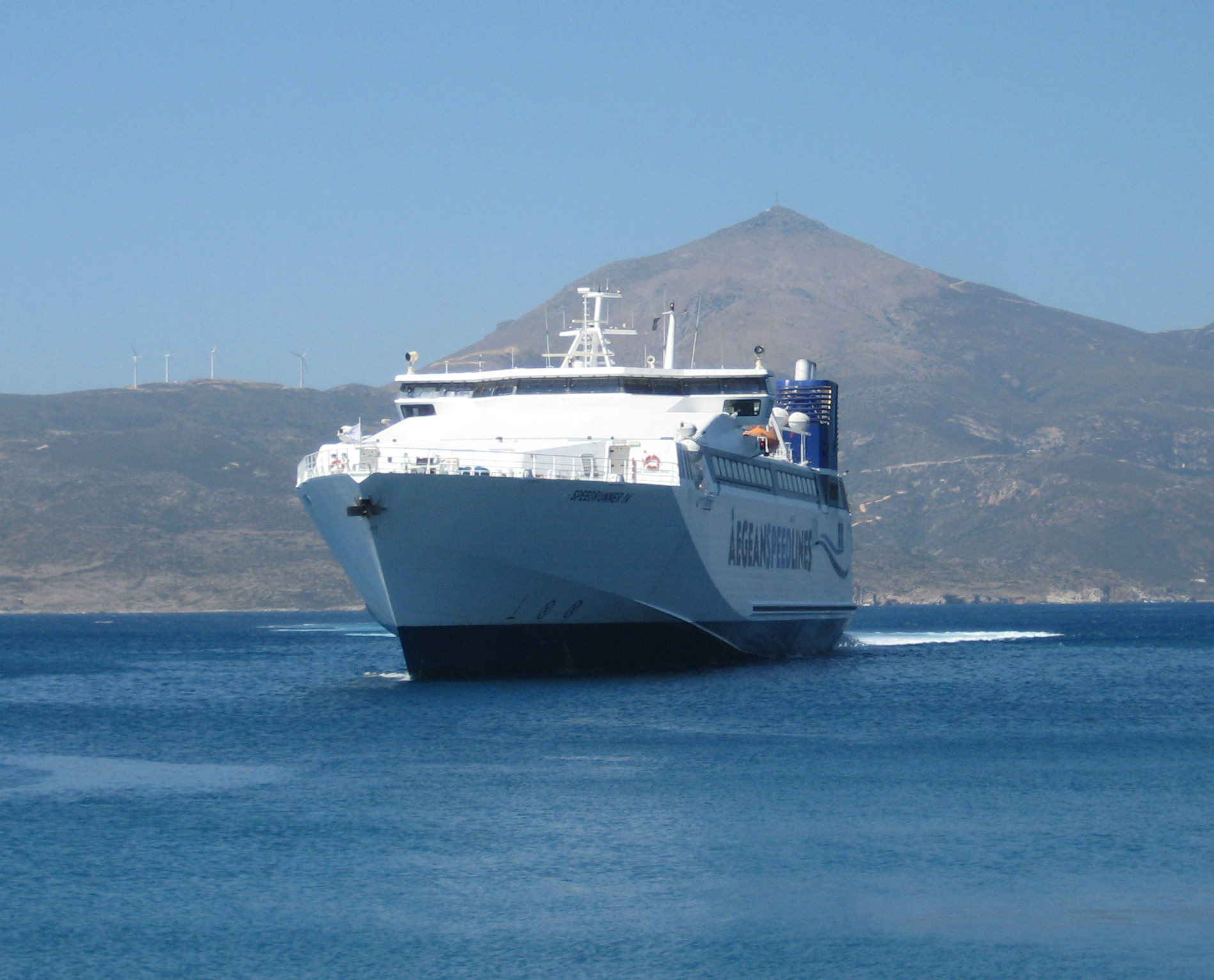
Speedrunner IV at Milos.

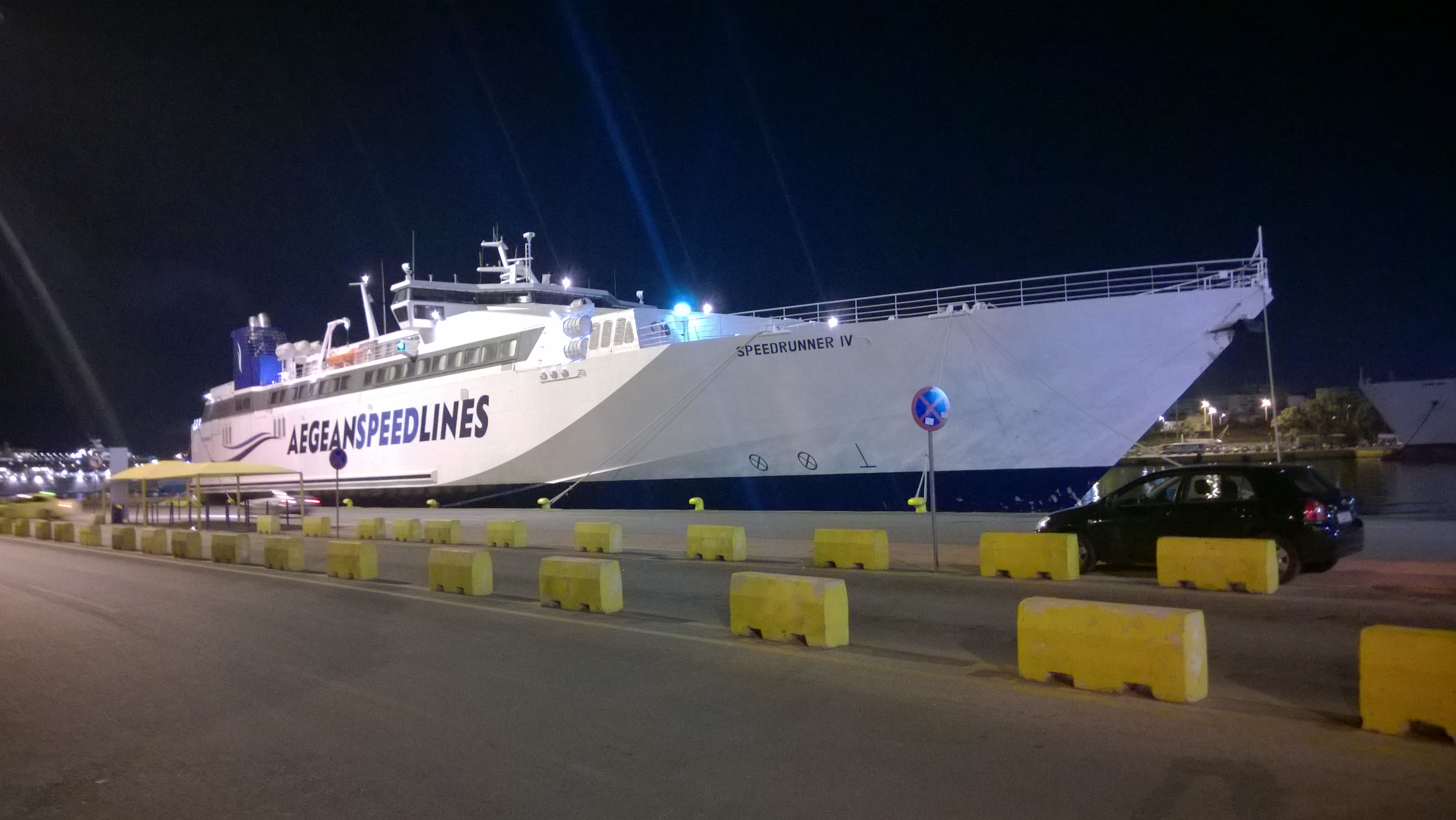
Speedrunner IV at Piraeus.

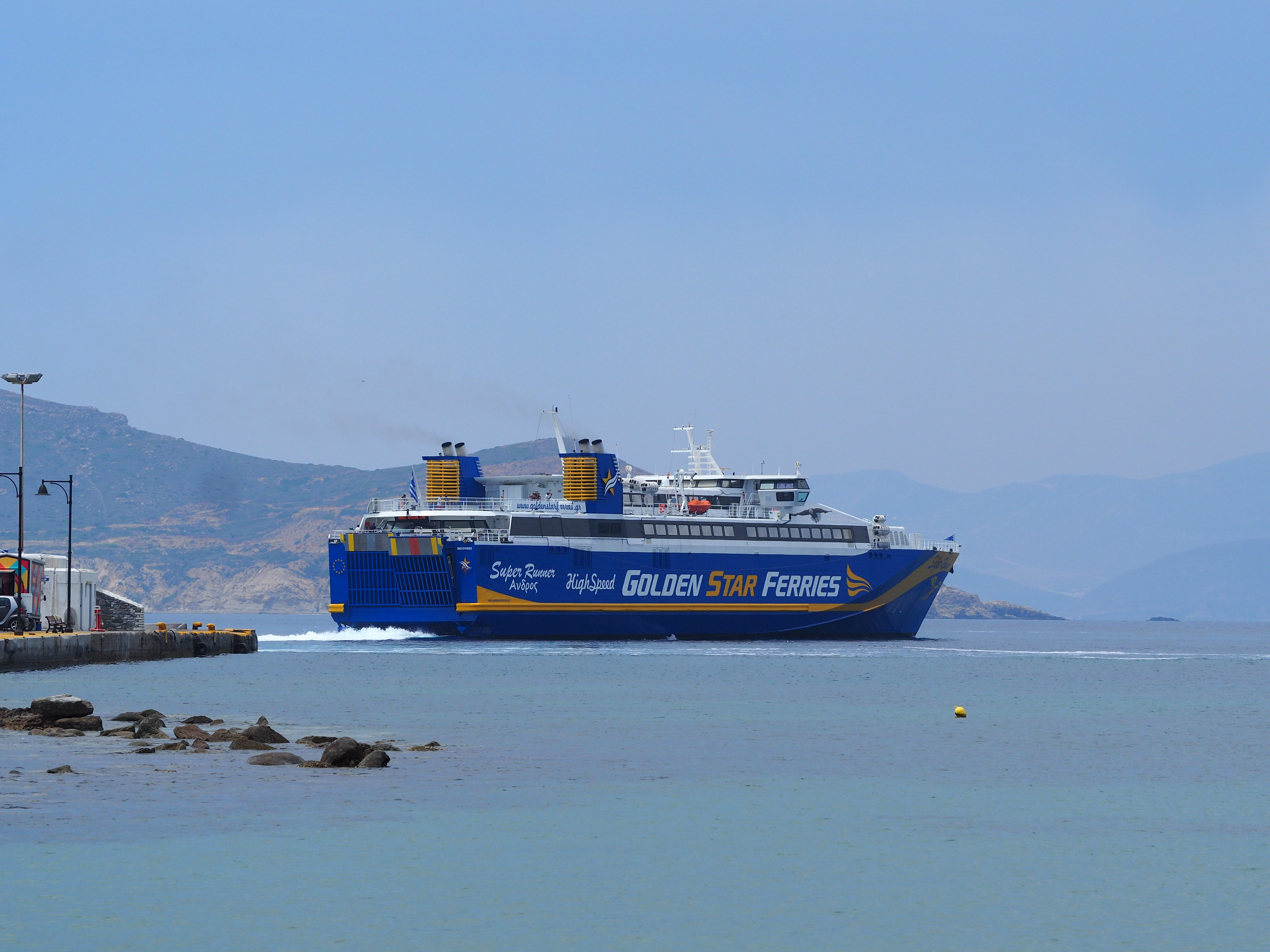
Super Runner at Naxos.
