= High Speed Jet =

Ocean-going catamaran

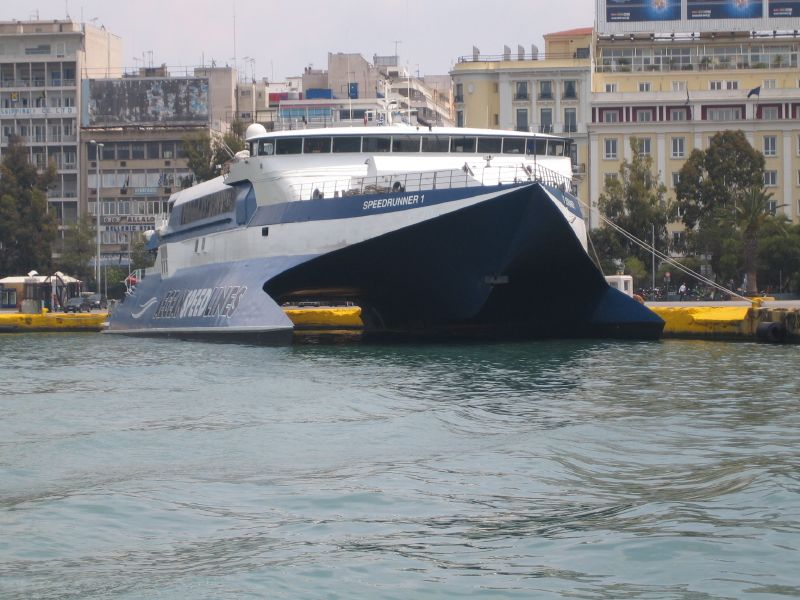
- Speedrunner 1 in 2006

History
- Name: 1990: Christopher Columbus; 1990–2004: Hoverspeed Great Britain; 2004–2005: Emeraude GB; 2005–2008: Speedrunner 1; 2008–2011: Sea Runner; 2011–2015: Cosmos Jet; 2015–Present: High Speed Jet
- Owner: Seajets (2010–Present)
- Operator: 1990–1992: Hoverspeed; 1992–1993 :Ferry Lineas; 1993–2003: Hoverspeed; 2003–2005: Emeraude Ferries; 2005–2008: Aegean Speed Lines; 2008–2011: Idomeneas Lines; 2011–Present: Seajets
- Port of registry: United Kingdom 1990–2008; Piraeus, Greece 2008–Present
- Builder: Incat, Hobart, Australia
- Yard number: 025
- Launched: 27 January 1990
- Maiden voyage: 1990
- In service: 12 July 1990
- Out of service: 2015
- Identification: Call sign: SVAD3; IMO number: 8900000; MMSI number: 239305900
- Honours and awards: Hales Trophy (eastbound)
- Status: Laid up in Avlida, Greece since 2015

General characteristics
- Type: Wave piercing catamaran
- Tonnage: 3,000 GT
- Length: 73.6 m (241 ft)
- Beam: 26.3 m (86 ft)
- Draught: 2.5 m (8 ft 2 in)
- Ramps: 2 × stern; 1 × bow
- Installed power: 4 x Ruston 16RK 270 medium speed diesel engines (4 x 3,600kW at 750 rpm)
- Propulsion: Four Riva Calzoni IRC115DX steering water-jets
- Speed: Cruise: 35 knots (65 km/h; 40 mph); Maximum: 42 knots (78 km/h; 48 mph)
- Capacity: 450 passengers; 80 cars

High Speed Jet is a 74 m (243 ft) catamaran built in 1990 for Hoverspeed. In 1990, as Hoverspeed Great Britain (Note: Briefly named and launched as Christopher Columbus, but she was renamed upon launch.), she took the Hales Trophy from the United States for the fastest eastbound transatlantic journey, making the run without passengers, in three days, seven hours and fifty-four minutes, averaging 36.6 knots (67.8 km/h; 42.1 mph). As of 2026, she is owned by Seajets.

== History ==
Hoverspeed Great Britain was built by International Catamarans (Incat) in Hobart, Australia and was launched as Christopher Columbus on 27 January 1990. However, after delivery, action was taken to rename the catamaran to Hoverspeed Great Britain.

The ship's previous names were: Christopher Columbus (1990), Hoverspeed Great Britain (1990–2004), Emeraude GB (2004–2005), and Speedrunner 1 (2005–2008, when she sailed the Mediterranean Sea for Sea Containers and Aegean Speed Lines.) Sea Runner (2008–2011) and Cosmos Jet (2011–2015, when she first began operating for Seajets).

She entered service on the Portsmouth to Cherbourg route on 12 July 1990 operating three round trips per day. Hoverspeed Great Britain was replaced on the cross-channel route by MDV 1200 class ferries Superseacat One and Superseacat Two.

== Specifications ==
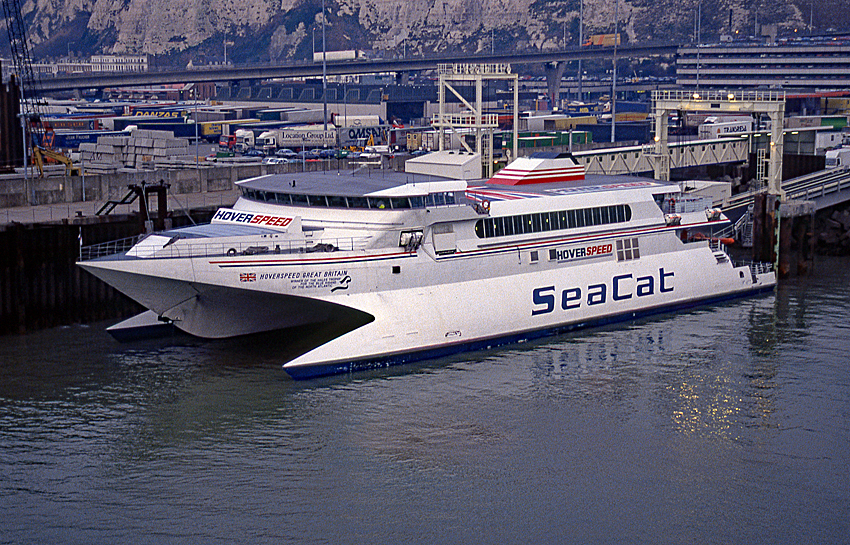
Hoverspeed Great Britain at Dover, 1992

Power is supplied by four Ruston 16RK270 V-16 marine diesel engines each with a 3600 kW (4825 hp) at 100% maximum continuous rating (MCR).

The 16RK270 engine has 16 cylinders, a 270 mm bore and a 305mm stroke, for a per cylinder displacement of 17.46L and a total displacement of 279.408L. The vessel in trials attained over 48 knots (89 km/h; 55 mph) on a 5-minute run; at full displacement she achieved 45.20 knots (83.71 km/h; 52.02 mph) maximum and 44.08 knots (81.64 km/h; 50.73 mph) for a two-way average.

Records
Preceded by United States	Atlantic Eastbound Record; 1990–1998	Succeeded by Catalonia
Preceded by United States	Hales Trophy; 1990–1998	Succeeded by Catalonia
