= Bob Mackenzie (businessman) =

British businessman

- Born: Robert David Mackenzie; December 4, 1952 (age 73); United Kingdom
- Education: Nottingham Trent University
- Occupations: Businessman, chartered accountant
- Known for: Former Chairman of Northgate plc and The Automobile Association
- Spouse: Jane Mackenzie
- Children: 5

Robert David Mackenzie (born 4 December 1952) is a British businessman who has held leadership roles at consumer services businesses. He was the Executive Chairman of The AA (Automobile Association) from 2014 to 2017. He was the Chairman of Northgate plc until his retirement in 2015.

== Early life ==
He attended Bablake School in Coventry, then in Warwickshire. He attended Trent Polytechnic (now NTU). He qualified as a Chartered Accountant with KPMG in 1978.

== Career ==
His previous experience includes having been Chairman and CEO of National Car Parks and Green Flag, CEO of Sea Containers, Chairman of PHS Group plc and senior executive board positions with a number of other companies.

=== The AA ===
In June 2014 AA was taken public, in a management buy-in, for £1.18bn. Mackenzie became the company's Executive Chairman on 26 June 2014, on a salary of £750,000, and also sat on the AA's Nomination Committee. At the time the AA had around £3bn in debt.

He was sacked as Executive Chairman of The AA on 1 August 2017, for "gross misconduct" after a fight in a hotel bar, although his son Peter said his father had "tendered his resignation" due to a "mental health issue... He is very unwell and has been admitted to hospital."

== Personal life ==
Mackenzie is married to Jane, and has two daughters and three sons. He lives in Warwickshire, and enjoys fishing on the River Test.

Business positions
Preceded by Chris Jansen (Chief Executive)	Executive Chairman of The Automobile Association; August 2014 - August 2017	Succeeded by John Leach
Preceded by James Sherwood	Chief Executive of Sea Containers; January 2006 - October 2006	Succeeded by Company defunct
