= MDV 1200-class fast ferry =

Class of Italian vessels

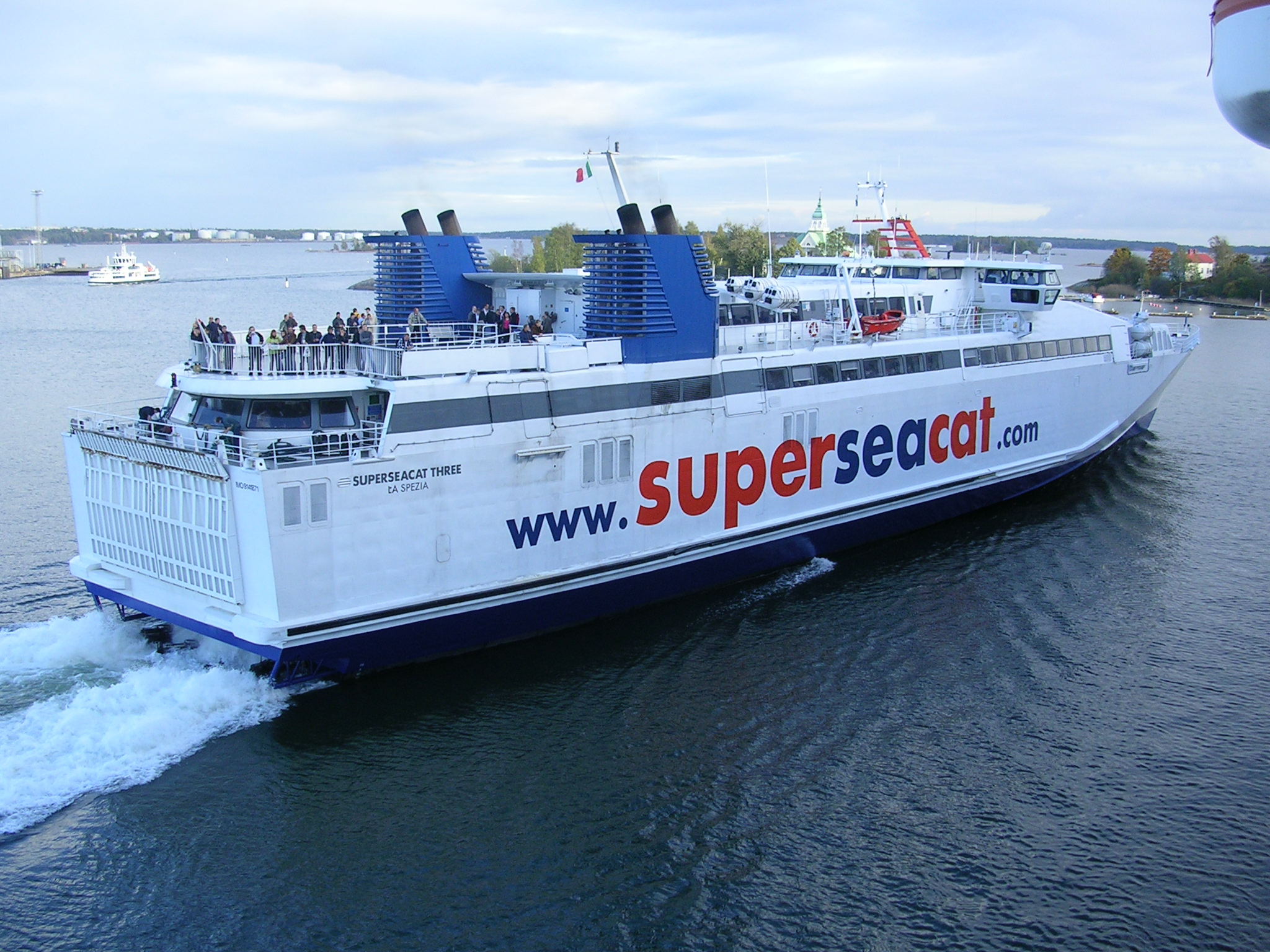
- HSC SuperSeaCat Three

Class overview
- Builders: Fincantieri
- Operators: Sea Containers (former); Aegean Speed Lines (former); Arab Bridge Maritime (former); Trasmediterránea (former); Hellenic Seaways (2007–); Naviera Paraguana (2014–); Golden Star Ferries (former); Seajets (2021–); Horizon Sea Lines (former)
- In service: 1997–present
- Completed: 6
- Active: 6

General characteristics
- Type: Fast ferry
- Tonnage: 3,971 GT (MDV1200); 4,463 GT (MDV1200II)
- Length: 100 m (328 ft 1 in)
- Beam: 17.1 m (56 ft 1 in)
- Draft: 2.6 m (8 ft 6 in)
- Propulsion: 4 × MTU 8V183 (Paraguana I/Fertiti); 4 × Ruston 20RK270 (Speedrunner Jet 2/Hellenic Highspeed); 4 × Ruston V20RK270 (Speedrunner Jet/Superrunner Jet)
- Speed: 37 knots (69 km/h; 43 mph) (Paraguana I/Fertiti); 40 knots (74 km/h; 46 mph) (Speedrunner Jet 2/Hellenic Highspeed); 42 knots (78 km/h; 48 mph) (Speedrunner Jet/Superrunner jet)
- Capacity: Passengers: 600–690; Cars: 147–175
- Crew: 29

The MDV 1200-class fast ferry is a class of six high-speed craft built by Fincantieri in Italy. Four of these vessels were for Sea Containers, with the other two vessels being for Ocean Bridge Investments.

== History ==
The MDV1200 craft were built for Ocean Bridge Investments, and were delivered in 1996 (Pegasus One) and 1997 (Pegasus Two) respectively. Pegasus One was sold to Tallink, and later to Stena Line. In 2007 she was sold to Aegean Speed Lines and was renamed Speedrunner II. In 2014, Speedrunner II was sold to Naviera Paraguana and was renamed Paraguana I. Pegasus Two operates at Arab Bridge Marinetime, under the name Queen Nefertiti.

The MDV1200II craft were built for Sea Containers. The first two craft (SuperSeaCat One and SuperSeaCat Two) were delivered in 1997, the third and fourth craft (SuperSeaCat Three and SuperSeaCat Four) followed in 1999. Originally built for operating on the English Channel, the venture was operated by Hoverspeed. The "SuperSeaCat"' operation did not last on the Channel, as in 1998 SuperSeaCat Two went on operations with the Isle of Man Steam Packet Company for a year. The following year SuperSeaCat Three operated for the Steam Packet, undertaking her initial voyage with the company between Liverpool and Douglas.

Since then, SuperSeaCat One, SuperSeaCat Three and SuperSeaCat Four operated for Silja Line. In 2003, SuperSeaCat Two went on a long-term charter to the Isle of Man Steam Packet Company. In 2005, the first of the quartet, SuperSeaCat One, was sold to Trasmediterránea, and renamed Almudaina Dos. In 2021, Almudaina Dos was sold to Greek ferry company Horizon Sea Lines and renamed HSC Santa Irini.

It was revealed in 2008 that Sea Containers had sold SuperSeaCat Three and SuperSeaCat Four to Aegean Speed Lines, which operate the two ships on their usual Helsinki-Tallinn route. SuperSeaCat 3 was renamed Speedrunner 3 and SuperSeaCat 4 was renamed Speedrunner IV. It was also revealed in 2008 that SuperSeaCat Two would operate as Viking for the remainder of her charter to the Steam Packet. In 2009, Viking was sold to Hellenic Seaways and renamed Hellenic Wind. In 2016, Hellenic Wind was renamed Hellenic Highspeed by Hellenic Seaways. In 2022, she was chartered to AML (Africa Morocco Link).

In 2016, Speedrunner IV was sold to Greek ferry company Golden Star Ferries and was renamed Super Runner. In 2021, Super Runner was sold to Seajets and was renamed HSC Super Runner Jet. In 2022, Speedrunner 3 was sold to Seajets and was renamed HSC Speedrunner Jet.

== Vessels ==
Name	Built	Tonnage	Yard No.	History
Paraguana I (Pegasus One)	1996	3,971 GT	5965	Sold to Naviera Paraguana in 2014
Fertiti (Pegasus Two)	1997	4,662 GT	6005	Sold to Seajets in 2026
Speedrunner Jet 2 (SSC1)	1997	4,662 GT	5999	Sold to Seajets in 2023
Hellenic Highspeed (SSC2)	1997	4,662 GT	6000	Sold to Hellenic Seaways in 2009
Speedrunner Jet (SSC3)	1999	4,662 GT	6003	Sold to Seajets in 2022
Super Runner Jet (SSC4)	1999	4,662 GT	6004	Sold to Seajets in 2021

== Layout ==
- Deck 1: Bridge
- Deck 2: Upper passenger deck, open deck
- Deck 3: Lower passenger deck, retail facilities
- Deck 4: Car deck
- Deck 5: Engine room, fuel tanks
