= Hellenic Highspeed =

High-speed craft owned by Hellenic Seaways

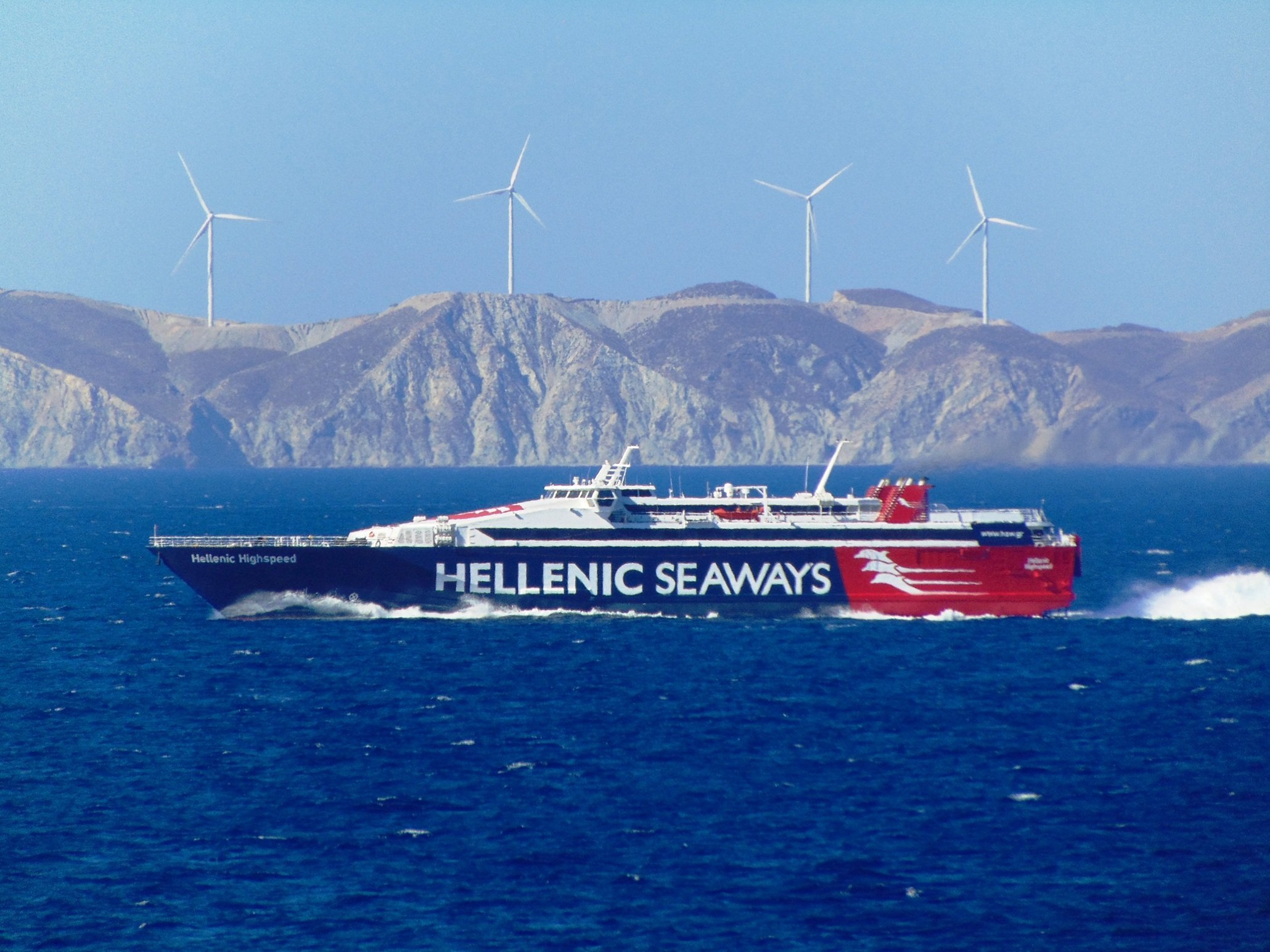
- Hellenic Highspeed off Piraeus

History
- Name: 1997–2008: Superseacat Two; 2008–2010: Viking; 2010–2016: Hellenic Wind; 2016–present: Hellenic Highspeed
- Owner: Hellenic Seaways
- Operator: 1997–1998, 1999–2000: Hoverspeed; 1998–1999, 2000–2001: SeaCat; 2003–2009: Isle of Man Steam Packet Company; 2009–2015: Atlantico Line; 2015–present: Hellenic Seaways
- Port of registry: 1997–2003: La Spezia Italy; 2003–2010: Liverpool UK; 2010–2016: Valletta Malta; 2016–present: Piraeus Greece
- Ordered: 1996
- Builder: Fincantieri, La Spezia
- Cost: GB£20,000,000
- Yard number: 6000
- Laid down: 1996
- Launched: March 1997
- Acquired: June 1997
- In service: 26 June 1997
- Identification: IMO number: 9141845
- Status: In service

General characteristics
- Class & type: MDV1200 class fast ferry
- Tonnage: 4,463 GT
- Length: 100 m (330 ft)
- Beam: 17.1 m (56 ft)
- Draught: 2.6 m (8.5 ft)
- Installed power: 4 × GEC Alsthom Ruston 20RK270 diesel engines
- Propulsion: 4 × Kamewa Waterjets; 1 × Bow thruster
- Speed: Service: 38 knots (70 km/h; 44 mph); Maximum: 40 knots (74 km/h; 46 mph)
- Capacity: Passengers: 690; Cars: 147
- Crew: 26

Hellenic Highspeed is a high-speed craft owned by Hellenic Seaways, having previously being owned by Sea Containers.

== Isle of Man Steam Packet Company ==
SuperSeaCat Two in previous SPC livery, 2007

She first entered services between Dover and Calais for Sea Containers subsidiary Hoverspeed in 1997, named HSC SuperSeaCat Two before moving to the Irish Sea in 1998 primarily for service between Liverpool and Dublin but also for Isle of Man Steam Packet Company services between Liverpool and Douglas. The vessel returned to Hoverspeed in 1999 to reopen the Newhaven-Dieppe route which had been closed by P&O Stena Line earlier that year. Her place on the Irish Sea was taken by her sister, SuperSeaCat Three.

In 2000, she once again sailed on the Irish Sea, this time between Heysham and Belfast but again returned to Hoverspeed this time for service between Dover and Calais or Ostend operating alongside 2 of her 3 sisters. After spending some time laid up in Portsmouth she returned to service on the Newhaven-Dieppe run before being chartered to the Isle of Man Steam Packet Company, which had by then been sold by Sea Containers.

In May 2008, it was announced that the Isle of Man Steam Packet Company had purchased Incat 050 (now Manannan), and it would replace Viking from the 2009 season. At the end of the 2008 season, Viking sailed to Alexandra Dock, Liverpool to lay-up for the winter. In January 2009, Viking left drydock to cover the passenger sailings of Ben-my-Chree, which had gone into drydock for propeller repairs. After Ben-my-Chree returned to service, Viking returned to lay-up in Liverpool.

== Atlânticoline ==
Viking was expected to depart from Liverpool for her Azores charter to Atlânticoline around 5–6 July. A side-loading door that was fabricated in Portsmouth was fitted. She did not leave until 23 July due to a leak that was found when her fuel tanks were being filled for her long voyage. The port side of Viking has lost the web address, "steam-packet.com", due to re-painting following the insertion of the side-loading vehicle door. During the voyage her hull was damaged due to weather and docked at Falmouth for repairs. She finally arrived in the Azores and began service on the morning of 5 August. Steam Packet masters were believed to be accompanying the ship for training purposes and then to act as the representatives.

== Hellenic Seaways ==
Viking was sold to Hellenic Seaways and was renamed Hellenic Wind in September 2009. In early 2016, Hellenic Wind was renamed Hellenic Highspeed. Starting from April 2016, it operates on the Rafina - Cyclades line, calling at the ports of Tinos, Mykonos, Paros, Ios, Santorini.
