= SuperSeaCat =

Shipping company

- Company type: Limited company
- Industry: Passenger transportation
- Founded: 2006
- Defunct: 2008
- Fate: Dissolved
- Headquarters: Helsinki, Finland
- Area served: Finland, Tallinn
- Owner: Sea Containers

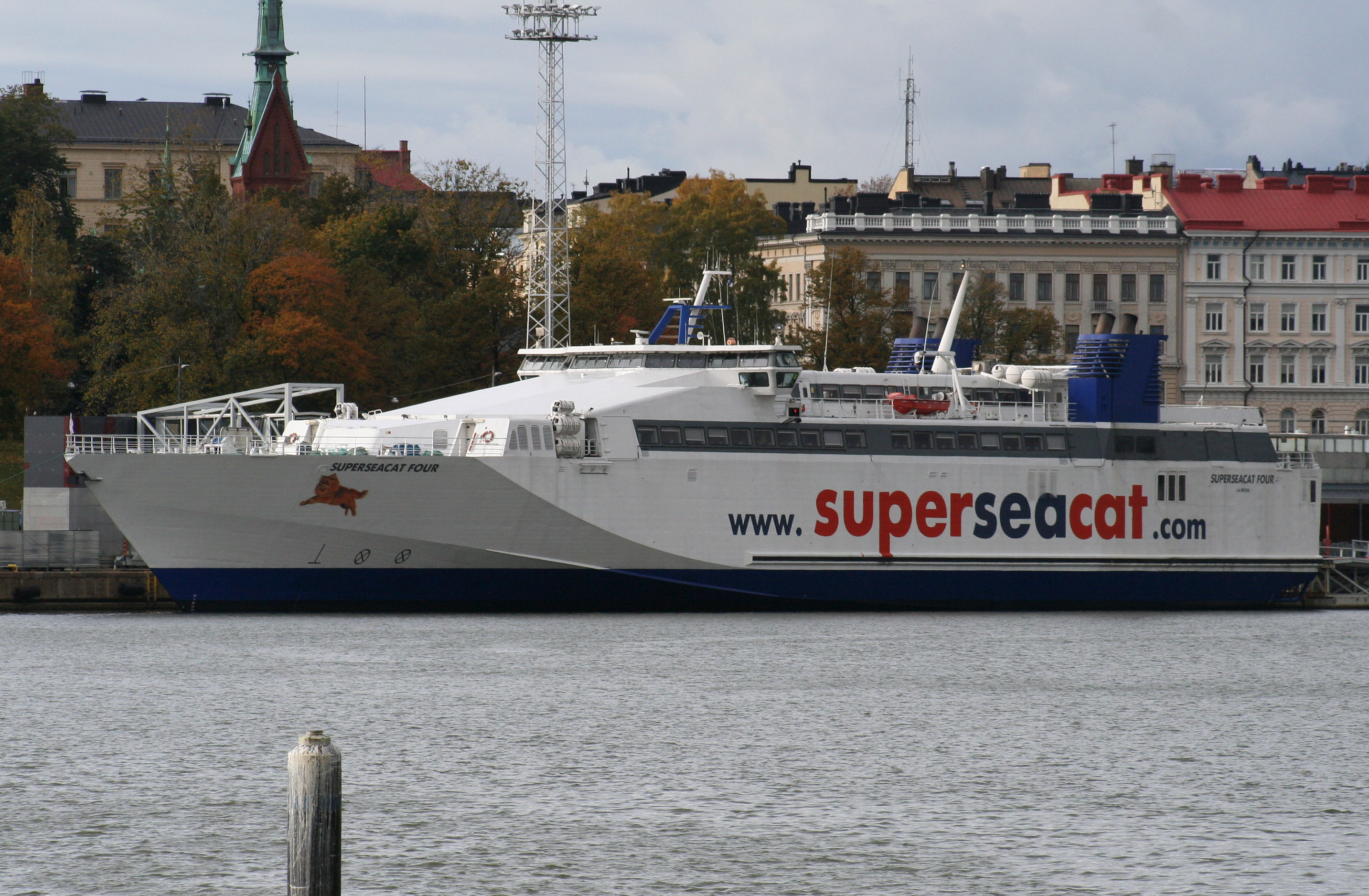
HSC SuperSeaCat Four in Helsinki, 2007

SuperSeaCat was a shipping company operating fast ferries between Helsinki, Finland and Tallinn, Estonia during the years 2000–2008. It was jointly owned by Sea Containers and the Greece-based Aegean Speed Lines.

The term SuperSeaCat had been used as name for Sea Containers' non-catamaran fast ferries since 1997. From the year 2000 onwards the company operated one SuperSeaCat (later three) under Silja Line brand between Helsinki and Tallinn. In 2006 Sea Containers sold Silja Line to Tallink, a competing Baltic Sea ferry operator. However, the Silja Line SuperSeaCat's could not be included in the sale as by acquiring them Tallink would have had a dominant market position in Helsinki—Tallinn fast ferry traffic. As a result, Sea Containers established SuperSeaCat as a new subsidiary to continue traffic on the route. In January 2008 SeaContainers sold 50% of the SuperSeaCat operations to the Greece-based Aegean Speed Lines.

On 15 October 2008 SuperSeaCat ceased operations due lack of funding and increased competition on the service, and on 20 October 2008 SuperSeaCat went bankrupt.

== Ships ==
- HSC Speedrunner three
- HSC SuperSeaCat Four

== See also ==
- MDV1200 class fast ferry
