= MS Anemos =

Cruiseferry built in 1980

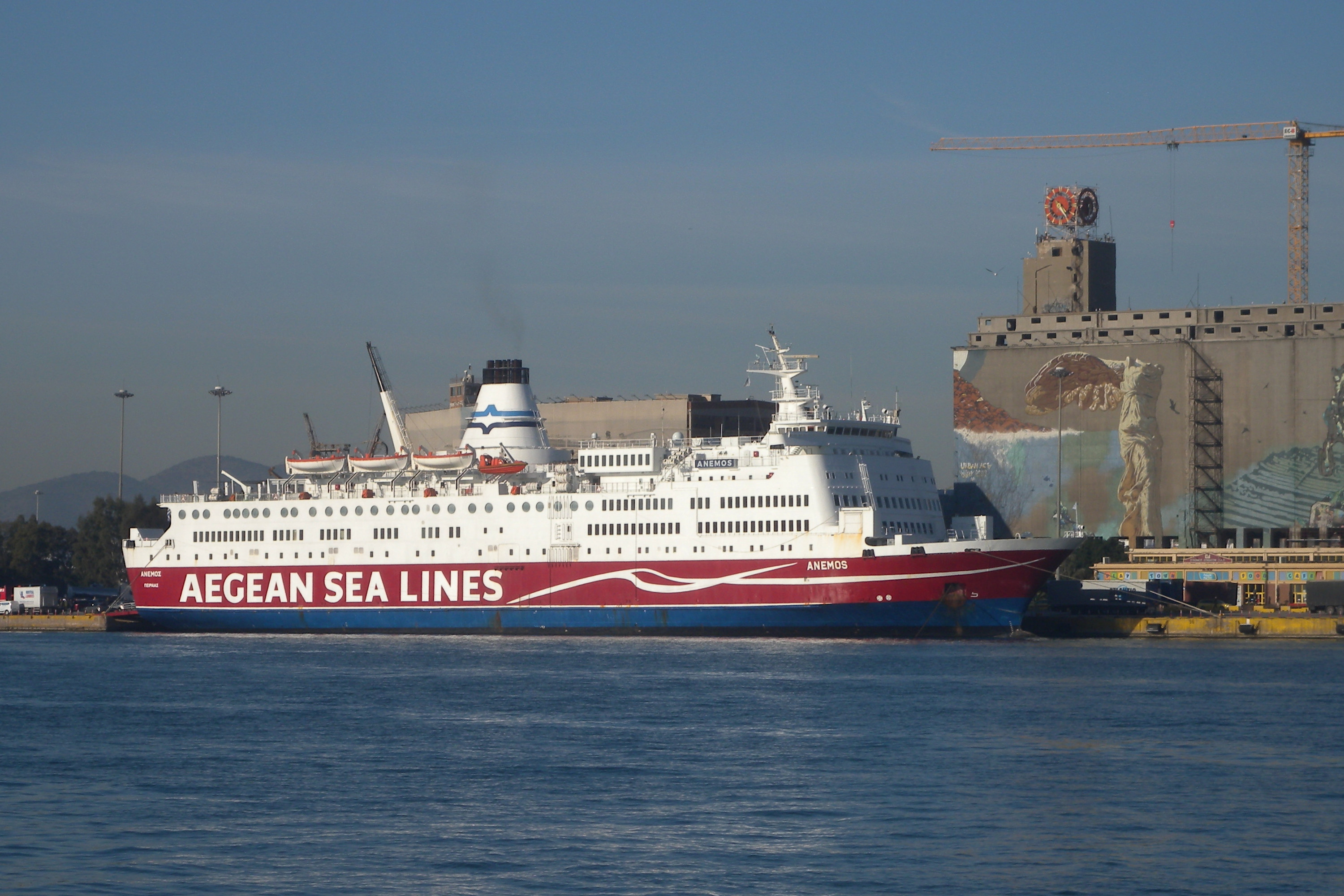
- Anemos at Piraeus.

History

Greece
- Name: Rosella (1980–2023); Anemos (2023–Present)
- Owner: Aegean Sea Lines (2023–2026)
- Operator: Viking Line (1980–2023); Aegean Sea Lines (2023–2026)
- Port of registry: (1980–2008): Mariehamn, Finland; (2008–2014): Norrtälje, Sweden; (2014–2023): Mariehamn, Åland; (2023–Present): Piraeus, Greece
- Ordered: 18 January 1979
- Builder: Wärtsilä Turku Shipyard, Turku, Finland
- Laid down: 27 April 1979
- Launched: 14 August 1979
- Completed: 1980
- Acquired: 25 April 1980
- Maiden voyage: 23 May 1980
- In service: 1980
- Identification: Call sign: SVCW2; IMO number: 7901265; MMSI number: 230180000; DNV ID: 12434
- Status: In service
- Notes: 'Anemos' means 'wind' in Greek

General characteristics
- Type: Cruiseferry
- Tonnage: 16,850 GT
- Length: 136.11 m (446 ft 7 in)
- Beam: 24.24 m (79 ft 6 in)
- Draft: 5.4 m (17 ft 9 in)
- Ice class: 1 A
- Propulsion: 4 × Wärtsilä-Pielstick 12PC2-2V; 17,652 kW (combined)
- Speed: 20.2 knots (37.4 km/h; 23.2 mph)
- Capacity: 1,700 passengers; 1,184 passenger beds; 350 vehicles; 720 lanemeters

MS Anemos is a cruiseferry owned and operated by the Greek ferry company Seajets. She was built in 1980 as Rosella by Wärtsilä Turku shipyard, in Turku, Finland, for SF Line, one of the owners of the Viking Line consortium. She served on Viking Line's Kapellskär–Mariehamn route before being sold to Aegean Sea Lines in January 2023.

== Background ==
=== New vessels for SF Line ===
The market for transporting passengers, cars and cargo trucks across the Baltic Sea between Finland and Sweden grew steadily during the 1960s and the early 1970s. During these years, two major carriers on these services emerged: Viking Line and Silja Line. By the time of the mid-1970s, the Ålandian based shipping company SF Line operated three ships as a part of Viking Line. Although not more than ten years old, these ships was already beginning to be too small and held too few passenger cabins to meet the growing demand from passengers. In response to this, as well as the newbuilings recently added to the Silja Line fleet, SF Line decided to order two new and bigger ships. These ships would later be known as the MS Turella and the Rosella.

=== Ordering ===
The lowest bid for building the two new vessels came from Mitsubishi Heavy Industries. In order to save job opportunities in Finland, the Finnish state subsidised the construction of the new ships with 17 million Finnish markka. Thus, the order for the ships eventually went to Wärtsilä and both ships were to be built at their shipyard in Turku, Finland.

=== Design ===
SF Line's latest newbuilding was the Aurella, delivered to the company in 1973. The Aurella was of a new breed of ferries crossing the Baltic, she had two decks of public spaces along with two separate car decks. Inspired by the success of the Aurella, the newbuildings' design resembled her closely although more cabins and larger public spaces were added.

=== Naming ===
SF Line's earlier ships were all named with the suffix -ella with the prefix taken from names of the regions where the ships sailed. Thus the MS Kapella had her name taken from the port of Kapellskär, the MS Marella's from Mariehamn and the MS Aurella's from the Aura River in Turku. In this manner, the first of the newly built ships was named the Turella, the name deriving from the city of Turku. The second ship got her name, Rosella, from the region of Roslagen (the coastal areas north of Stockholm).

=== Building and Delivery ===
The Turella was put into Viking Line traffic between Turku and Stockholm on June 15, 1979. The Rosella was laid down on April 27, 1979, and was launched on August 14, 1979. Nine months later, on April 25, 1980, the Rosella was delivered to SF Line. Due to a seaman's strike in Finland, the Rosella wasn't put into service until May 23 when she started sailing on the Naantali-Kapellskär route.

== Service history ==
During almost her entire career, the Rosella has been a part of the fleet of Viking Line. She has served on the longest time and on more routes than any other Viking Line ship.

=== Naantali–Mariehamn–Kapellskär (1980–1981) ===
When delivered, the Rosella was put in service on Viking Line's route between Naantali and Kapellskär together with her sister Turella and SF-Line's Aurella.

=== Turku–Mariehamn–Stockholm (1981–1988) ===
After one year of service, Rosella was transferred to the Turku–Stockholm route, switching routes with Slite's Diana II. The Rosella continued on this route until the delivery of the Amorella on October 14, 1988.

=== Naantali–Mariehamn–Kapellskär (1988–1993) ===
In 1987 SF Line made an agreement with Stena Line to sell the Rosella to them once the Amorella was delivered in March 1988. However, the Amorella's delivery was delayed by seven months, meaning the Rosella could not be delivered to Stena in time for the summer season 1988, and SF Line had to pay them compensations. In the end Stena and SF Line reached an agreement where the Turella, which was in better condition and easier to convert for the traffic Stena planned her for, was sold instead of Rosella. As a result, the Rosella took over the Turella's role on the Naantali–Mariehamn–Kapellskär route, replacing her sister for the second time.

=== Turku–Mariehamn–Stockholm (1994–1997) ===
After the collapse of Rederi AB Slite, the other Viking Line partner, in 1993, SF Line was forced to reorganise its operations. After construction of additional cabins in place of the cardeck on deck 4, Rosella returned to the Turku–Mariehamn–Stockholm route in January 1994. During the summer seasons of 1995 and 1996 MS Cinderella replaced Rosella on the Turku route, freeing her to operate car-passenger friendly Naantali route during the high season.

=== Stockholm–Mariehamn cruises (1997–2003) ===
When Viking acquired MS Gabriella in 1997, the Rosella was replaced on the Turku–Stockholm service by MS Isabella. In the new situation the Rosella started making 24 (later 20/22) hour cruises from Stockholm to Mariehamn under the marketing name Dancing Queen during the winter season, but still returned to the Naantali–Mariehamn–Kapellskär route for the summer months. In 1999 the summer route's eastern terminus was changed to Turku, allowing Viking to give up the terminal at Naantali completely.

=== Helsinki–Tallinn (2003–2008) ===
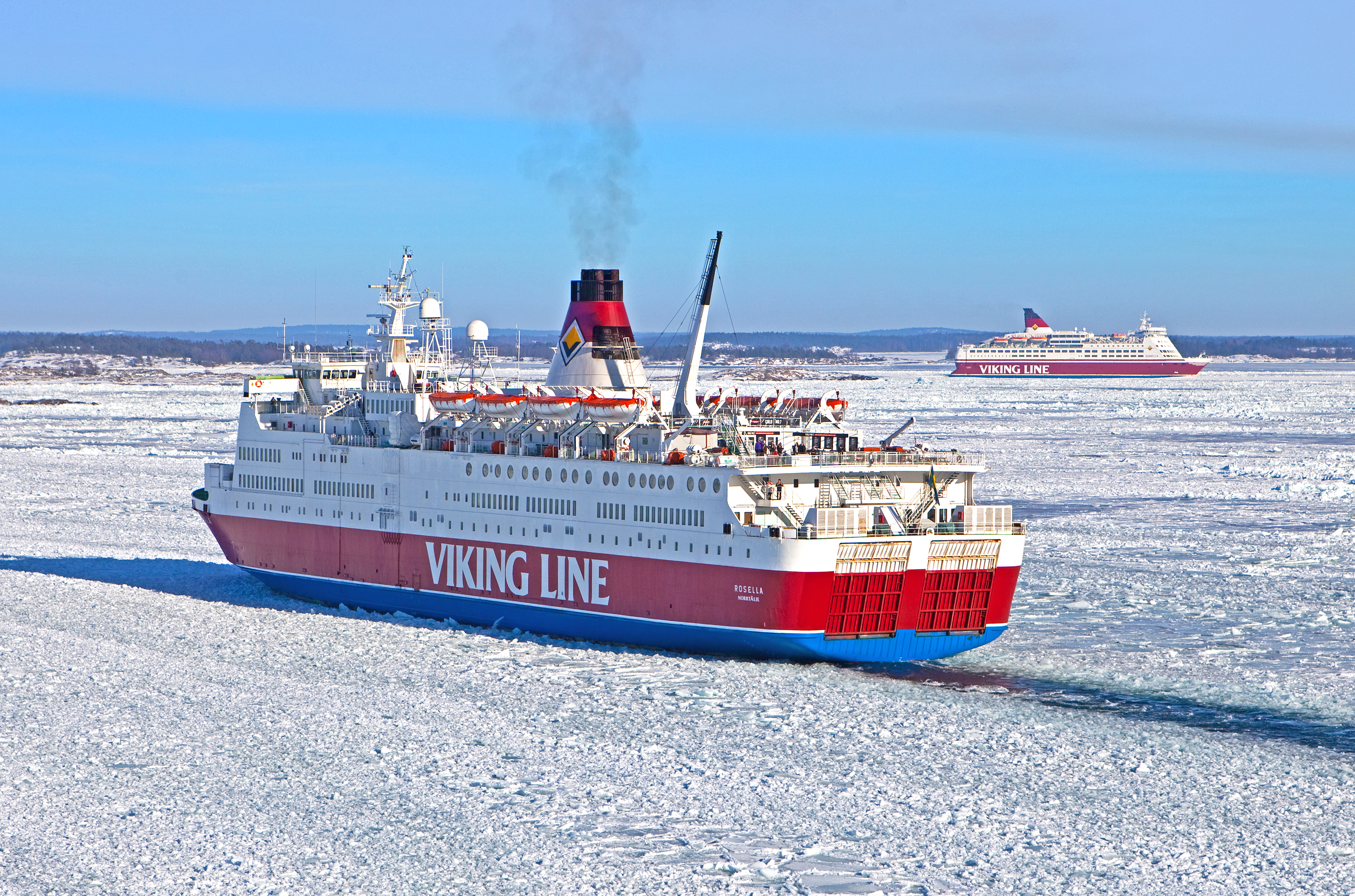
Rosella at the Baltic Sea

Fearing losses after the termination of tax-free sales between Finland and Estonia after Estonia joined the EU in 2004, Viking Line decided to swap the routes of Rosella and Cinderella in autumn 2003. Rosella began a ferry-service between Helsinki and Tallinn with two daily departures from both ports, while the Cinderella (now renamed Viking Cinderella) took over Rosella's Stockholm–Mariehamn cruise itinerary. Due to high prices the Rosella's new route was extremely unpopular during the first year and the company strongly considered selling the ship. However, after prices were lowered the ship's popularity increased, to the extent that in 2006 Viking Line decided to order a new fast ferry for the Helsinki-Tallinn route, the MS Viking XPRS. The Viking XPRS replaced Rosella on the route on April 28, 2008.

=== Kapellskär–Mariehamn (2008-2023) ===
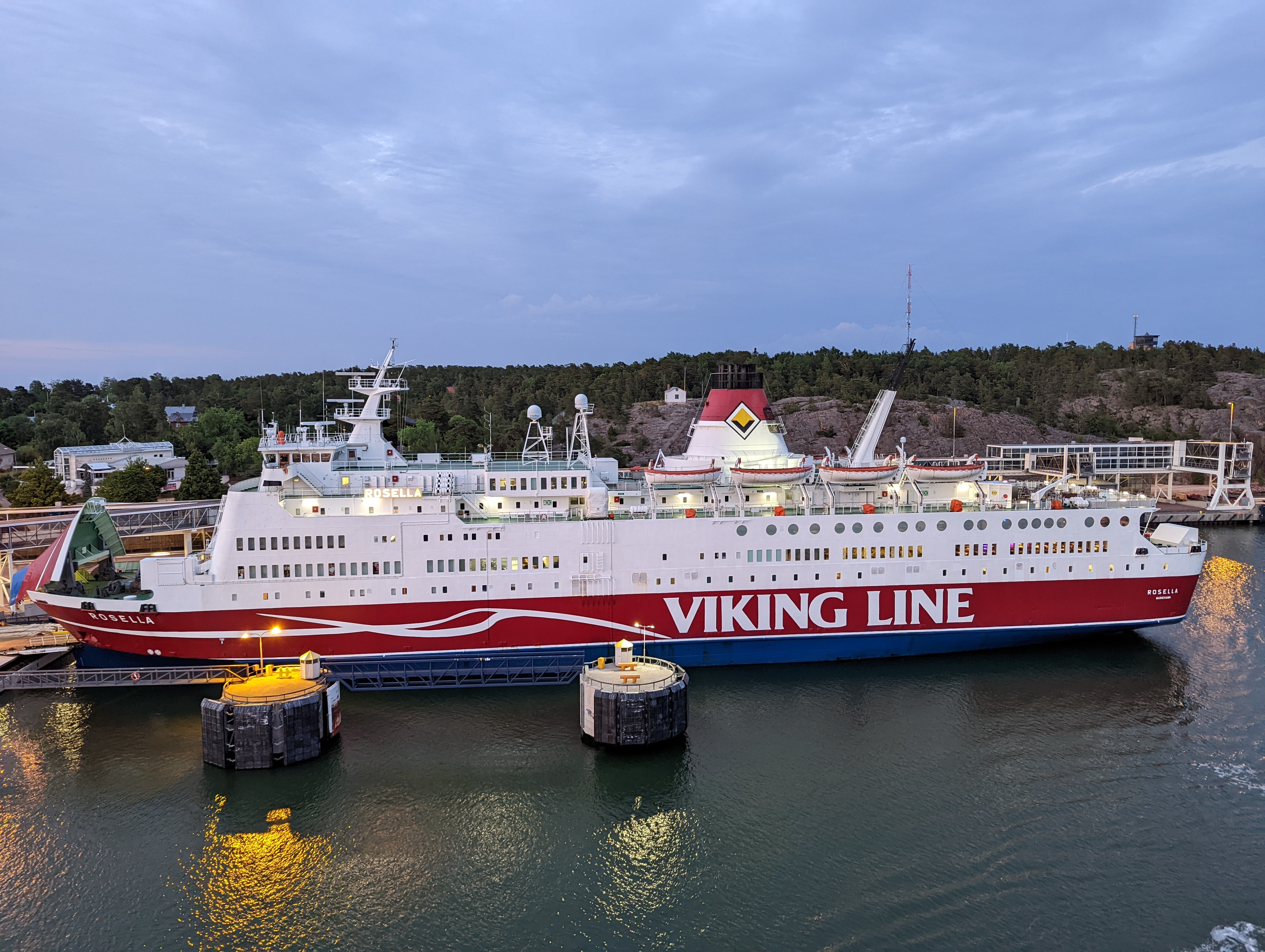
Rosella at Mariehamn in June 2022

On 30 May 2008, the Rosella replaced the Ålandsfärjan on the Kapellskär–Mariehamn route. She was supposed to be a temporary ship and then replaced by the newbuilding Viking ADCC in 2010. However, when the building project was cancelled due to big delays at the shipyard Rosella became the permanent ship to sail on the route. In early 2011 MS Rosella underwent a major refurbishment where the public areas were extensively rebuilt and enlarged.

In February 2013, Viking Line announced that Rosella will be re-flagged to Finland.

=== Greece (2023-present) ===
Viking Line's MS Rosella is sold to the Greek shipping company Aegean Sealines Maritime Co. for 11 million Euros. Rosella will be deployed there in the Aegean. Viking Line has been working hard to modernize its fleet. Alternative solutions for the short routes between Sweden and Åland are being examined.

The ship finished its services for Viking Line on 8 January 2023. Delivery was scheduled for the second half of January 2023. Rosella had been part of Viking Line's fleet since 1980. Although the ship is of a good standard, it no longer meets Viking Line's strict sustainability requirements.

Renamed as “Anemos”, she left Mariehamn for the last time on 24 January 2023. Anemos arrived at Greece on February 7, 2023, and moored at Perama for renovation and repairs.
