= Speedrunner Jet 2 =

1997 monohull ferry

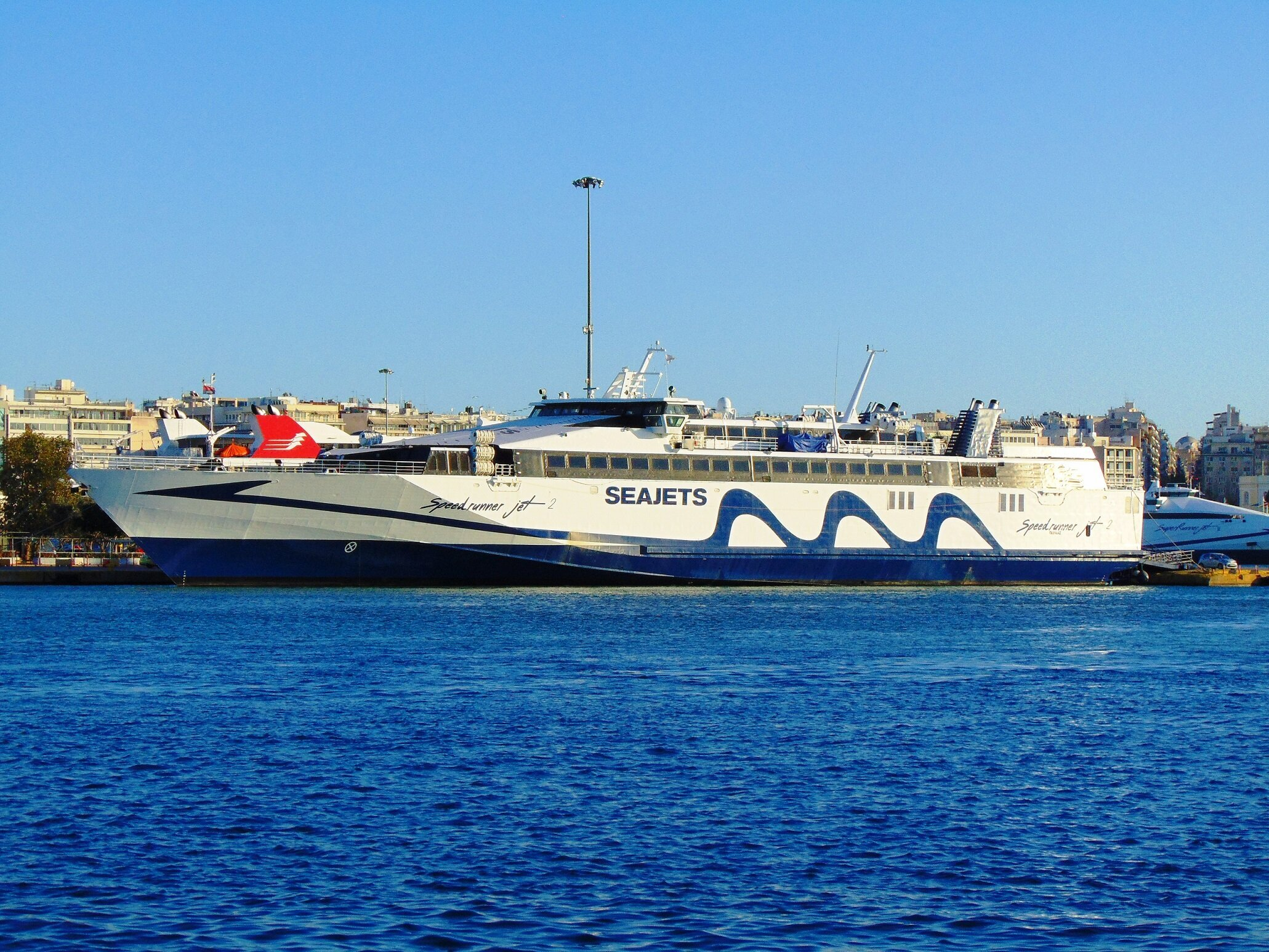
- Speedrunner Jet 2 in Piraeus

History
- Name: SuperSeaCat One (1997–2006); Almudaina Dos (2006–2022); Santa Irini (2022–2023); Speedrunner Jet 2 (2023–Present)
- Owner: Seajets (2023–Present)
- Operator: Hoverspeed (1997–2004); Silja Line (2004–2005); Acciona Trasmediterránea (2005–2022); Panellenic Lines (2022–2023); Seajets (2023–Present)
- Port of registry: Piraeus, Greece (2023–Present)
- Ordered: 1996
- Builder: Fincantieri
- Yard number: 5999
- Launched: 15 February 1997
- Completed: 1997
- Maiden voyage: 1997
- In service: 1997
- Identification: IMO number: 9141833
- Status: In service

General characteristics
- Class & type: MDV1200 class fast ferry
- Tonnage: 4,662 GT
- Length: 100 m (330 ft)
- Beam: 17.1 m (56 ft)
- Draught: 2.68 m (8.8 ft)
- Propulsion: 4 × Ruston 20RK 270 medium speed diesel engines; 4 × KaMeWa water-jets
- Speed: Service: 38 knots (44 mph); Maximum: 40 knots (46 mph)
- Capacity: Passenger: 800; Cars: 175
- Crew: 26

Speedrunner Jet 2 is one of four high speed monohull ferries built by Fincantieri for Sea Containers. She is currently owned and operated by Seajets.

== Service History ==
The vessel was delivered in May 1997 as Superseacat One and put into service on the Gothenburg - Frederikshavn route. In 1999 Seacat Danmark returned to the Gothenburg - Frederikshavn route allowing Superseacat One to move to the English Channel to open a new Hoverspeed route between Newhaven and Dieppe. After four years of operation, Hoverspeed closed the Newhaven - Dieppe route in 2004. Superseacat One was laid up in Sunderland. In 2005 she returned to Scandinavia, this time joining Superseacat Three and Superseacat Four on Silja Line's Helsinki - Tallinn route. Following the sale of Silja Line to Tallink in 2006, Superseacat One was chartered to Acciona Trasmediterránea and renamed Almudaina Dos. The vessel operates between Las Palmas de Gran Canaria and Santa Cruz De Tenerife.

In 2022, the vessel was sold to Greek ferry company Horizon Sea Lines and she was renamed Santa Irini. Since August 1, 2022 she sails daily between Heraklion and Santorini. In 2023 Santa Irini was sold to Seajets and renamed Speedrunner Jet 2.
