= Shirley Sherwood =

British writer and botanist

- Born: Shirley Angela Cross; 1 July 1933; St Albans, England
- Education: University of Oxford
- Occupation: Author
- Known for: Interest in botanical illustration
- Notable work: See Bibliography
- Spouse: James Sherwood (m. 1977; died 2020)
- Children: 2 sons

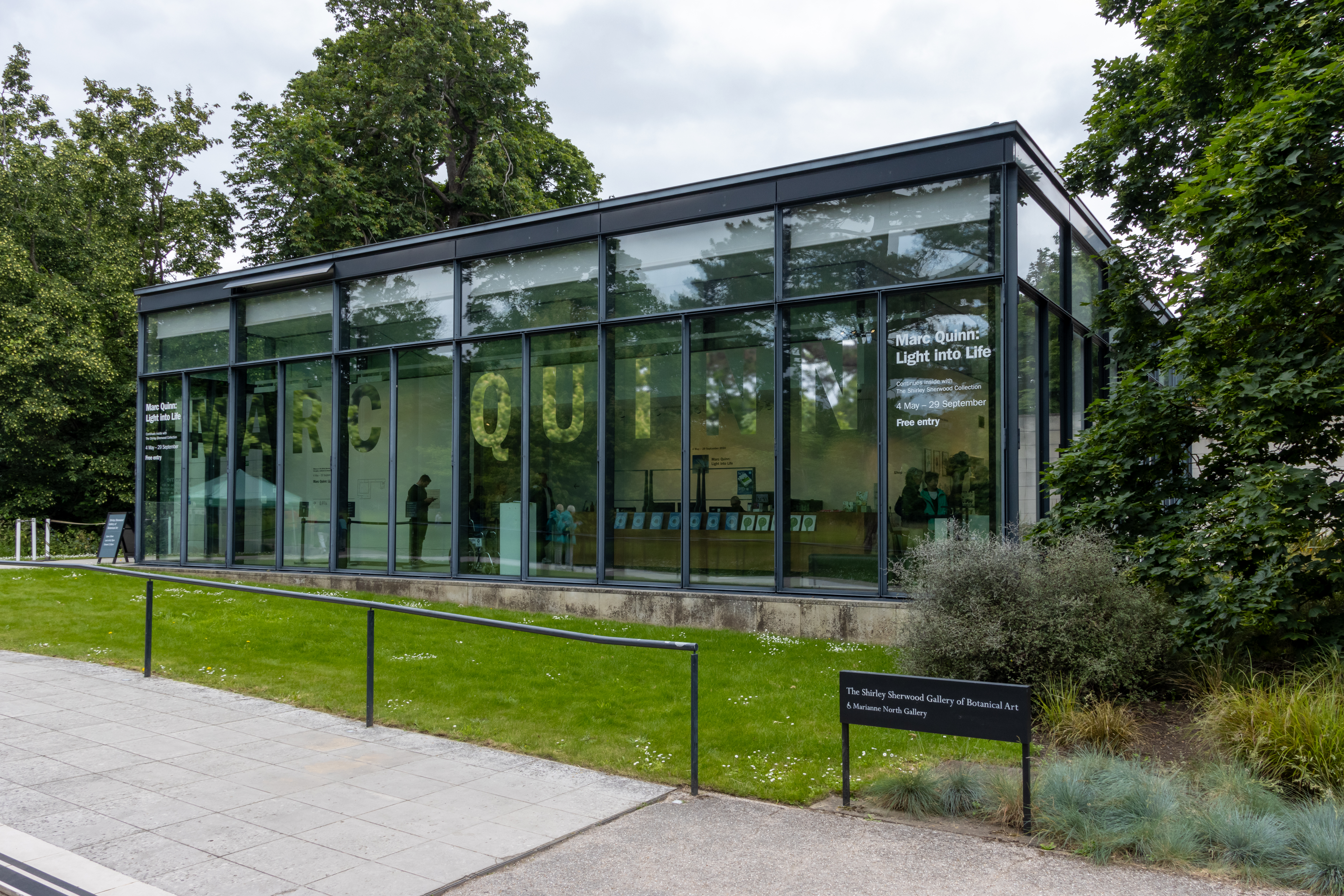
The Shirley Sherwood Gallery of Botanic Art

Shirley Angela Sherwood OBE (née Cross; born 1 July 1933) is a British writer, botanist and philanthropist.

== Early life ==
She was born Shirley Cross. Sherwood was educated at St Anne's College, Oxford. She took a bachelor's degree in botany and a D.Phil. working on a project that led to tagamet.

== Career ==
She is primarily a collector of, and author of books about, botanical illustrations. The Shirley Sherwood Gallery of Botanical Art, opened on 19 April 2008, at Kew Gardens is named after her. It was the first gallery in the world dedicated solely to botanical art. Sherwood has been described as a "driving force behind a revival of interest in botanical art".

She is a vice-president of the Nature in Art Trust.

== Honours ==
Sherwood was appointed Officer of the Order of the British Empire (OBE) in the 2012 New Year Honours for services to botanical art.

== Personal life ==
In 1977, Sherwood married the businessman James Sherwood, who appeared in the 2004 Sunday Times Rich List. Her sons, Simon and Charles, from her previous marriage adopted his surname.

== Bibliography ==
- The Art of Plant Evolution (2009), by Dr Shirley Sherwood and Dr W John Kress
- Contemporary Botanical Artists: The Shirley Sherwood Collection (1996); 2nd edition 2003
- A New Flowering: 1000 Years of Botanical Art (2005), by Shirley Sherwood, Stephen Harris & Barrie Edward Juniper
- Treasures of Botanical Art: Icons from the Shirley Sherwood and Kew Collections (2008), by Shirley Sherwood and Martyn Rix
- A Passion For Plants: Contemporary Botanical Masterworks from the Shirley Sherwood Collection (2001)
- Venice Simplon Orient-Express: The Return of the World's Most Celebrated Train (1983); 2nd edition 1985; 3rd edition 1990; 4th edition 1996
- Shirley A. M. Cross (1977) Localization of histamine and histamine H2-receptor antagonists in the gastric mucosa The Histochemical Journal 9 pages 619–644

== See also ==
- Florilegium
