= Zigup =

British van rental company

Zigup plc
- Formerly: Goode Durrant & Murray, Northgate plc, Redde Northgate plc
- Type: Public
- Traded as: LSE: ZIG; FTSE 250 component
- Industry: Vehicle rental
- Founded: 2 July 1897; 129 years ago (the legal entity); 1981 (the Northgate business); entity) 2020 (Redde Northgate)
- Headquarters: Darlington, County Durham, England, United Kingdom
- Key people: Avril Palmer-Baunack, chairman; Martin Ward, chief executive
- Revenue: ▲£1,858.9 million (2026)
- Operating income: ▲£141.8 million (2026)
- Net income: ▼£76.2 million (2026)
- Website: www.zigup.com

Zigup plc is a large commercial vehicle rental provider and of accident management and repair services, operating in the UK, Ireland and Spain. It is headquartered in Darlington, County Durham with over 130,000 vehicles, mainly light commercial vehicles. The company is listed on the London Stock Exchange and is a constituent of the FTSE 250 Index.

== History ==
=== Goode Durrant plc ===
Goode Durrant plc was incorporated on 2 July 1897.

In January 1987, Goode Durrant & Murray Group plc was acquired by an Australia-listed company Ariadne Australia via its Hong Kong-listed company Impala Pacific, which renamed the UK company to Goode Durrant plc.

In July 1987, Goode Durrant acquired Northgate Motor Holdings, a company established by Alan Noble in 1981 as Noble Self Drive in Darlington.

In 1997, Goode Durrant bought Transport Development Group (TDG) Vehicle Rental.

=== Northgate plc ===
In 1999, Goode Durrant plc was renamed into Northgate plc. In 2002 the company acquired 40% of Furgonetas de Alquiler SA, a Spanish vehicle rental business, and subsequently exercised an option to buy the remainder. In 2005, Arriva sold its UK-wide vehicle rental business to Northgate for £129 million.

Kevin Bradshaw replaced Bob Contreras as chief executive in 2017.

=== Redde Northgate plc ===
In 2020, Northgate plc merged with Redde plc, a provider of replacement vehicle, incident and accident management services, to form Redde Northgate plc.

Martin Ward replaced Kevin Bradshaw as chief executive as part of the merger.

=== Zigup Plc ===
In 2024, Redde Northgate plc announced a change of name to become Zigup plc.

== Operations ==
The company offers vehicle rental, fleet management, electric charging installation, vehicle disposal, vehicle ancillary services, replacement vehicle, repairs, incident & claims management, vehicle data and EV fleet consulting.
