= James Sherwood =

American businessman

- Born: James Blair Sherwood; August 8, 1933; Newcastle, Pennsylvania, US
- Died: May 18, 2020 (aged 86); London, England
- Education: Yale University
- Known for: Founder, Sea Containers
- Spouse: Shirley Cross (m. 1977)
- Children: 2 sons (adopted)

James Blair Sherwood (August 8, 1933 – May 18, 2020) was an American-born, British-based businessman, and the founder of Belmond Limited and Sea Containers.

== Early life ==
James Blair Sherwood was born in Newcastle, Pennsylvania, the son of William Sherwood, a patent attorney, and Florence. He grew up in Lexington, Kentucky, and earned a degree in economics from Yale University. Sherwood learned about shipping first in the United States Navy, spending three years as a cargo officer, and then working for United States Lines and CTI for six years.

== Business career ==
In 1965, Sherwood founded Bermuda-based, New York Stock Exchange listed, London-headquartered shipping company Sea Containers with initial capital of $100,000. Over forty years Sherwood expanded Sea Containers from a supplier of leased cargo containers, into various shipping companies, as well as expanding the company into luxury hotels and railway trains, including the Venice-Simplon Orient Express and Great North Eastern Railway that operated the InterCity East Coast franchise.

Although valued with a net worth of £60million in the 2004 Sunday Times Rich List, as Sea Containers hit financial troubles, he resigned as Co-Chief Executive Officer from each of his companies in 2006. He continued as a Director of Orient Express Hotels Ltd until retiring on 9 June 2011. He was later designated as Founder and Chairman Emeritus.

== Personal life ==
In 1977, Sherwood married the writer and botanist Shirley Cross. Her sons, Simon and Charles, from her previous marriage adopted his surname.

He died on May 18, 2020, of complications after abdominal surgery, aged 86.
