= Aegean Sea Lines =

Greek ferry company

- Founded: 2005
- Founder: Leonidas Demetriades-Eugenides
- Fate: Ceased all operations in 2026
- Headquarters: Glyfada, Athens, Greece
- Area served: Greece, Cyclades
- Services: Passenger transportation
- Parent: Eugenides Group
- Website: www.aegean-sealines.gr

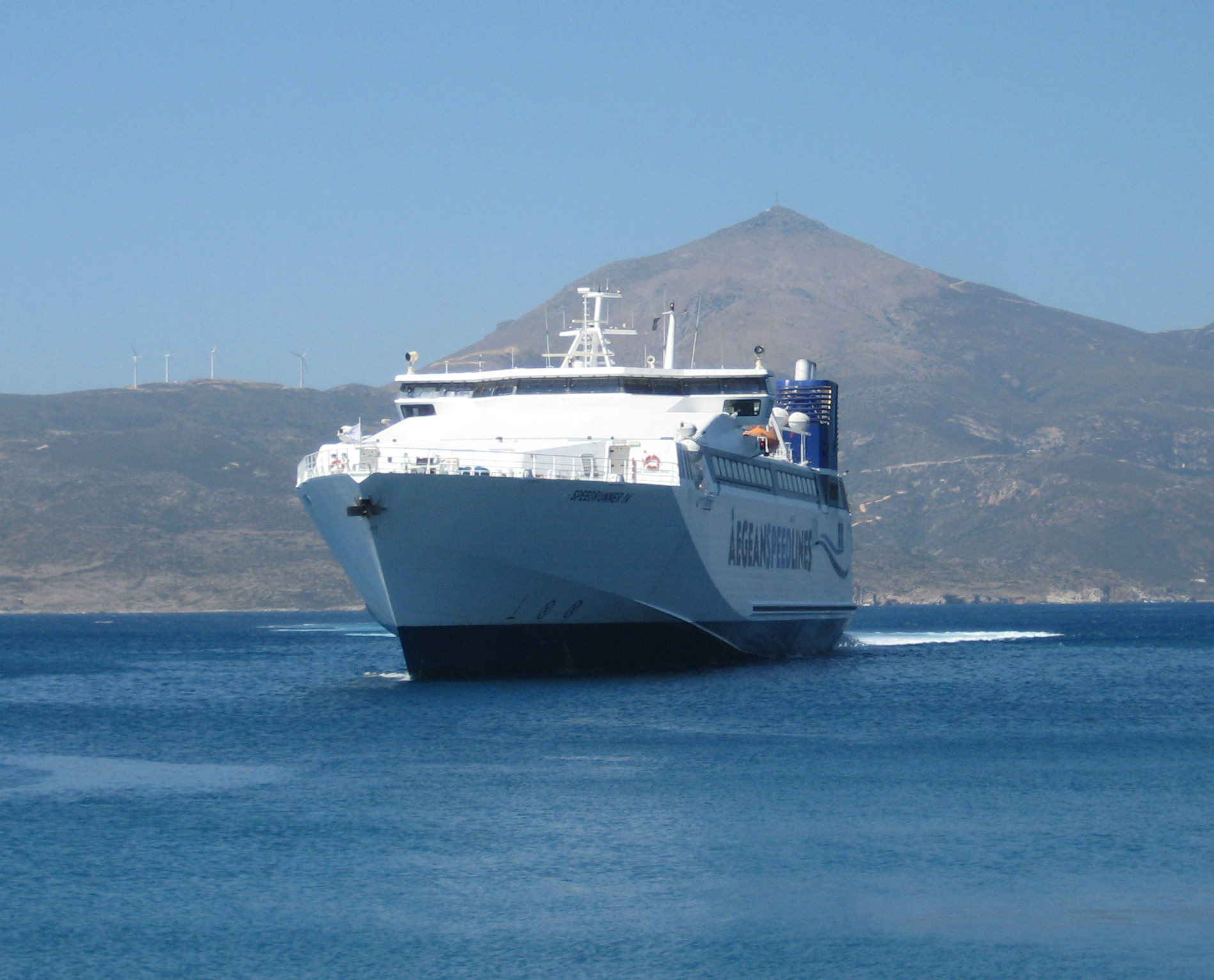
Speedrunner IV arriving at Milos

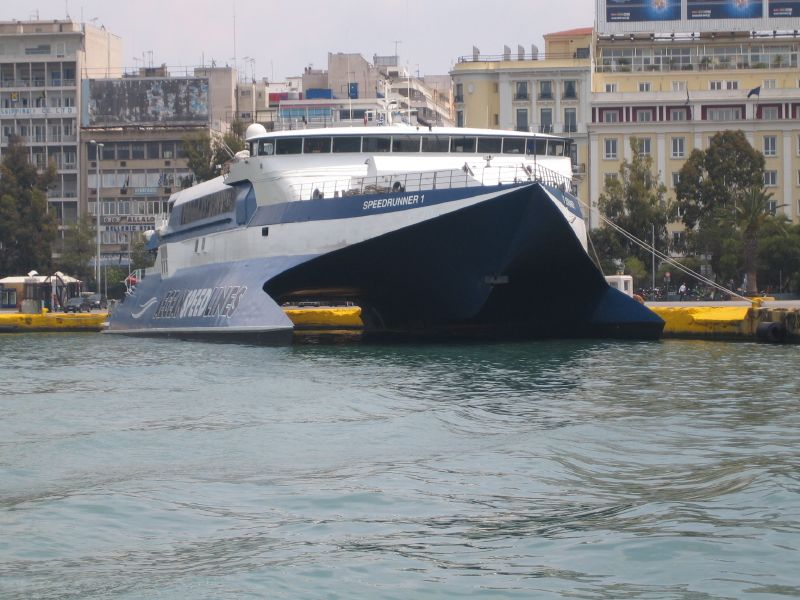
Speedrunner I in Piraeus

Aegean Sea Lines (former Aegean Speed Lines) was a Greek ferry company that was operating ferry services between Piraeus and the Cyclades. Prior to 2022 it was operating high-speed ferries. Company's operations ended in 2026 when its last ferry Anemos was sold.

== History ==
Aegean Speed Lines were formed in 2005 as a joint venture between Sea Containers and the Eugenides Group. Aegean Speed Lines were the first ferry company in Greece to use a European Union flag vessel on a domestic route following deregulation of ferry services in Greece. Sea Containers sold its share in 2006 leaving the Eugenides Group as the major shareholder.

== Fleet ==
Aegean Sea Lines began operations using a single high speed catamaran Speedrunner I. Following two successful seasons a Fincantieri built monohull Speedrunner II joined the fleet in 2007. On 2008, the company sold Speedrunner I. In 2009 two more monohulls Speedrunner III and Speedrunner IV joined the fleet. In 2015 and 2016 respectively, the company sold the Speedrunner II and the Speedrunner IV. In 2022 the company decided to stop the operations with its only remaining ship in its fleet Speedrunner III and Aegean Speed Lines sold its ship to Seajets. In 2023 Aegean Speed Lines rebranded as Aegean Sea Lines and decided to return in action with a conventional ferry. It bought the ex-Viking Line ship Rosella and renamed her Anemos. Anemos was sold to Seajets in 2026 ending the company's operations.

Former fleet:

- Speedrunner I (2005–2008)
- Speedrunner II (2007–2015)
- Speedrunner IV (2009–2016)
- Speedrunner III (2009–2022)
- Anemos (2023–2026)

== Awards ==
In 2009 Aegean Speed Lines was awarded by "Lloyd's List Greek Shipping Awards" as "The Best Passenger Line of the Year 2009".
