= Sea Containers =

1965–2009 Bermudan-registered shipping company

Sea Containers Ltd.
- Industry: Passenger transport Leisure; Marine container leasing
- Founded: 1965
- Defunct: 2009
- Fate: liquidated
- Headquarters: Hamilton, Bermuda; London, England
- Key people: Bob Mackenzie (CEO & President); James Sherwood (Founder)
- Website: www.seacontainers.com

Sea Containers was a Bermudan registered company which operated two primary business areas: transport and container leasing.

It was founded in 1965 by James Sherwood and was initially focused on the leasing of cargo containers. During 1974, Sea Containers was floated on the New York Stock Exchange. Over the next three decades, the company branched into various other markets, leading to the creation of the Orient-Express Hotels chain, hovercraft, and the Venice-Simplon Orient Express train service. In May 1989, the British-based transport company Tiphook launched a $824 million bid to take over Sea Containers, which was successfully opposed by Sherwood. Sherwood maintained his leadership of the company into the twenty-first century, during which time he become fairly wealthy, something for which he was criticised following the collapse of the company.

During the 1990s, Sea Containers successfully bid for the InterCity East Coast franchise amid the privatisation of British Rail; it was awarded a seven-year franchise which it operated via a newly created subsidiary Great North Eastern Railway (GNER). In March 2005, the Strategic Rail Authority awarded the franchise to GNER for a further seven years; however, this newer arrangement lacked subsidies, instead requiring payments from GNER, contributing to the company's future financial hardship. During March 2006, amid several financial setbacks, Sherwood resigned from Sea Containers and many of his other companies. On 16 October, the company filed for Chapter 11 bankruptcy protection. While the remainder of the group was being wound down and liquidated, the remaining maritime container interests were transferred to the newly created SeaCo Ltd in 2009.

== History ==
=== Founding and diversification ===
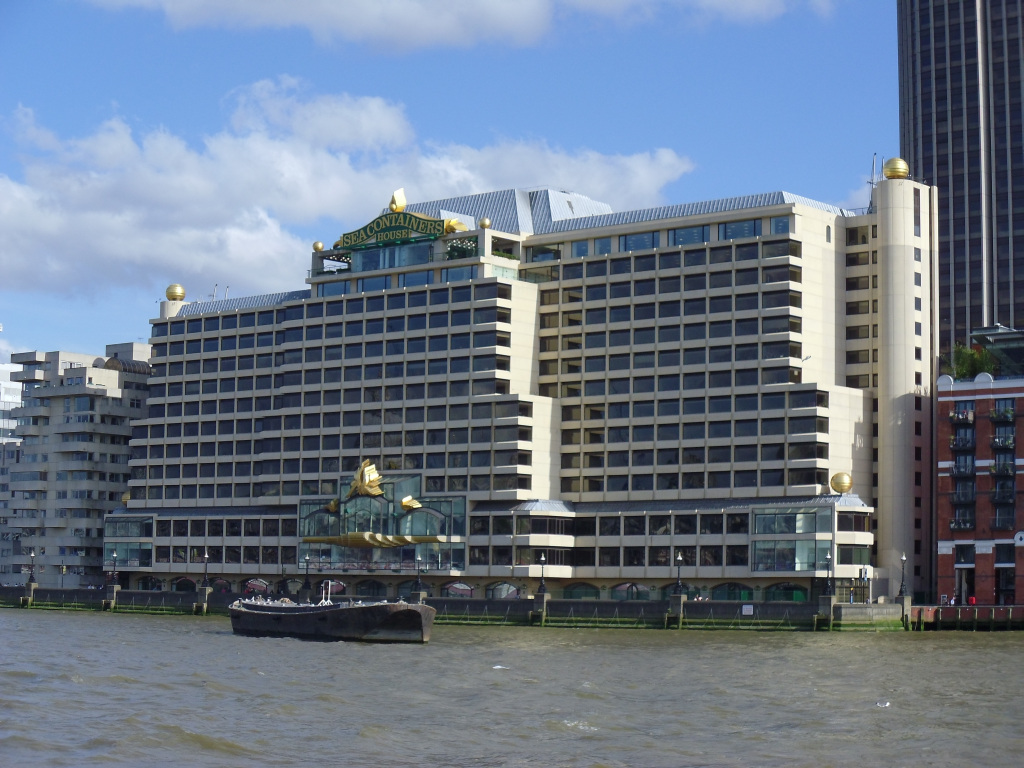
Sea Containers House on the River Thames in London

Sea Containers was established in 1965 by Yale University graduate and retired United States Navy officer James Sherwood; it had an initial capital of $100,000. The company's initial activities were centered upon the leasing of cargo containers to various shipping companies. However, under Sherwood's leadership, Sea Containers expanded over a 40-year period into numerous other markets, including luxury hotels and railways, many of these sectors being those that Sherwood had taken a personal interest in.

During 1968, Sea Containers became a public company; it was floated on the New York Stock Exchange in 1974.

After enjoying a stay at the Hotel Cipriani of Venice, Sherwood purchased the luxury hotel. Subsequent similar purchased led to the creation of the Orient-Express Hotels chain, which the Sea Containers held a stake in up until 2005. Another personal project was the prestigious Venice-Simplon Orient Express train service. Sherwood acquired thirty old 1920s carriages from across Europe and had them restored from often dilapidated conditions to facilitate the service's relaunch during 1982.

During February 1986, the British ferry company Hoverspeed was purchased for £5 million by British Ferries, a holding company for Sealink UK, which was in turn owned by Sea Containers.

=== Foiled takeover and GNER ===
In May 1989, the British-based transport company Tiphook launched a $824 million bid to take over Sea Containers, which was vigorously opposed by Sherwood. Amid this process, Tiphook's management alleged that Sherwood had an authoritarian management style, while Sherwood issued his own allegations of irregularities in filings with the Securities and Exchange Commission. Shareholders ultimately backed Sherwood's position, who had proposed asset sales and a restructuring to win favour, leading to Tiphook failing to acquire the company.

During the privatisation of British Rail of the mid-1990s; Sea Containers was one of various private sector companies that sought to obtain one of the newly created franchises. Over time, it would place bids for multiple franchises, including the South Western franchise in 2001 and the South Eastern franchise in 2006. However, its first bid was for the InterCity East Coast franchise, which was viewed as a particularly desirable one to obtain, the East Coast Main Line (ECML) having been recently electrified while also being worked by the newest intercity stock in British Rail's inventory, the InterCity 225, and thus had a well-established reputation for its high-speed services. In March 1996, Sea Containers was announced as the winner, being awarded a seven-year franchise upon the ECML via a newly created subsidiary Great North Eastern Railway (GNER).

During January 1997, Sherwood announced that GNER intended to procure a pair of two new-build tilting trains which were claimed to enable the London-Edinburgh journey to be reduced to only 3 hours and 30 minutes. While an order having been reportedly placed during October 1997, no such tilting trains were ever introduced. Despite this, GNER would successfully increase service speeds and run the fastest scheduled service in Great Britain at that time. In March 2005, the Strategic Rail Authority awarded the franchise to GNER for a further seven years, starting on 1 May 2005. The new franchise's terms were quite different from that of the original period; instead of GNER receiving subsidies, it would be instead paying the British state for the privilege of operating; there was reportedly concerns over the financial viability of such an arrangement from the onset. In order to meet these payments, GNER assumed passenger numbers would increase by around 30 per cent across the life of the franchise, reaching around 20 million by 2015.

During his leadership of Sea Containers, Sherwood accumulated substantial personal wealth; his net worth was estimated at £60million in the 2004 Sunday Times Rich List.

=== Financial hardship and collapse ===
In March 2006, Sea Containers announced that it was in the process of exiting from ferry operations, which had been one of the company's primary area of business; efforts were promptly launched to sell these operations onto third parties. Shortly thereafter, it was announced that the company lost a lucrative contract to provide back-up services to its container leasing operations, which by then it had been running as a joint venture with GE Capital. These two negative headlines were seen as serious blows to the future of Sea Containers, which reportedly had accumulated debts adding up to $1.3 billion by May of that year.

In response to these negative events, Sherwood promptly resigned from many of his companies, including Sea Containers. He was replaced by turnaround specialist Bob Mackenzie, while Ian Durant became senior vice-president of finance. MacKenzie sought to reduce the business' high debt burden via further sales, which he viewed as critical to any prospective rebuilding of the core enterprise; these efforts led to the rapid divestiture of 14,000 containers amongst other company assets. By July 2006, rumours were circulating that Sea Containers was preparing to sell GNER in an effort to avoid declaring bankruptcy.

Despite these activities, in early October 2006, Sea Containers announced that it was unlikely to be able to pay a $115 million (£62 million) bond that was due on 15 October. On 16 October, the company filed for Chapter 11 bankruptcy protection, at which point it reportedly had outstanding debts of $650 million with only $67 million of free cash remaining. Following this filing, Sherwood's role in the collapse, particularly his $2 million (£1 million) severance payment and $250,000 annual payout from his Sea Containers pension, was criticised; in response, he denied personal responsibility and attributed Sea Containers' fate to several factors, including elevated fuel prices, the 7 July 2005 London bombings, and incorrect assumptions in contract terms stipulated by the British government.

On 6 November 2006, the Department for Work and Pensions informed Sea Containers that it must pay £143 million into its two UK pension schemes if it wanted to wind them up.

On 11 February 2009, the remaining maritime container interests of Sea Containers were transferred to a new company, SeaCo Ltd, while the remainder of the group proceeded to be wound down and liquidated. The major shareholders in the new company were the bondholders of the former Sea Containers Ltd and two of the group's UK pension funds.

== Operations ==
=== Ferry services and related businesses ===
- Sealink British Ferries: ferry services around the United Kingdom and Ireland. Acquired in 1984, most Sealink operations were sold to Stena Line in 1990.
- Isle of Man Steam Packet Company: fast and conventional services in the Irish Sea. Acquired in 1996, sold in 2003.
- Silja Line: fast and conventional services in the Baltic Sea. In June 2006, Silja Line was purchased by Tallink, a ferry company from Estonia. The fast catamaran service SuperSeaCat was separated from Silja Line and operated until 2008 when it went bankrupt.
- Orient-Express Hotels: (25% shareholding) sold in 2005
- SeaStreak: following the Sea Containers bankruptcy of 2006, this operation was sold to New England Fast Ferry
- SNAV-Hoverspeed: a joint venture with Italian ferry operator SNAV. Used the former Seacat Danmark as Zara Jet.
- Aegean Speed Lines: a joint venture in Greece with the Eugenides Group. The service uses the former Hoverspeed Great Britain as Speedrunner 1, which operated in the English Channel and held the Hales Trophy and Blue Riband for the fastest crossing of the North Atlantic.
- Hoverspeed: English Channel services ceased in 2005
- SeaCat: (Belfast & Troon).

=== Other maritime ===
- Hart Fenton: a naval architecture and marine engineering company, sold to Houlder in 2006
- Sea Containers Chartering

=== Railways ===
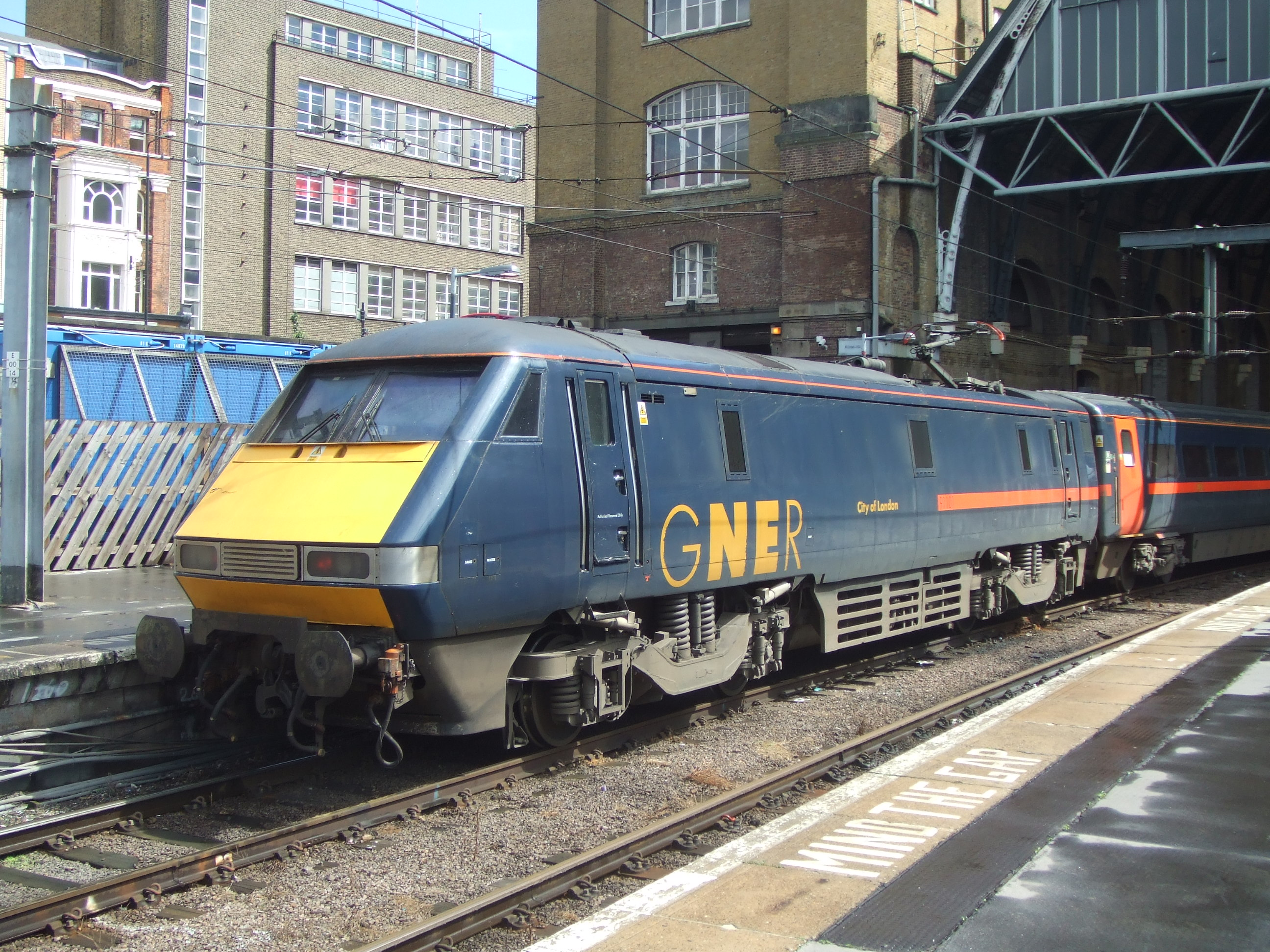
GNER InterCity 225 at London King's Cross in July 2007

- Venice-Simplon Orient Express: Luxury train service
- Great North Eastern Railway (GNER): a train operating company that commenced operating the InterCity East Coast franchise in April 1996. After winning a further 10-year extension when re-tendered in 2005, GNER ran into financial difficulties with Sea Containers handing back the franchise in December 2007.

=== Containers ===
The company's container leasing business was conducted mainly through GE SeaCo, a joint venture with GE Capital formed in 1998. GE SeaCo was sold to the HNA Group for approximately $1 billion on 15 December 2011 and now operates as Seaco.

=== Other former activities ===
- Sea Containers Property Services Ltd – property development, property asset management.
- The Illustrated London News Group (ILNG) – publishing
- Fruit farming – Sea Containers owned plantations in West Africa and South America
- Fairways & Swinford – UK-based business travel agency
