= Champion Jet 1 =

Fast catamaran ferry

- Seajets' ChampionJet 1 between Santorini and Ios

History
- Name: 1997: Hull 044; 1997–2015: Condor Vitesse; 2015–present: Champion Jet 1
- Owner: 1997–2002: Sovereign Business Finance Ltd; 2002–2014: Condor Ferries; 2015–present: Seajets
- Operator: 1998–1999: Condor Ferries; 1999–2000: Tranz Rail; 2000–2014: Condor Ferries; 2015–2018: Seajets; 2018–2020: Naviera Armas Chartered; 2020–present: Seajets
- Port of registry: Limassol, Cyprus, Cyprus
- Route: Santorini-Ios-Naxos-Paros-Syros-Pireaus-Syros-Mykonos-Paros-Naxos-Ios-Santorini*
- Builder: Incat, Tasmania, Australia
- Yard number: 044
- Laid down: 1 November 1996
- Launched: 7 May 1997
- Completed: 1997
- Identification: IMO number: 9151008

General characteristics
- Tonnage: 5,007 gt
- Length: 86.62 m (284.2 ft)
- Beam: 26 m (85.3 ft)
- Draft: 3.5 m (11.5 ft)
- Installed power: 4x Ruston 20RK270
- Propulsion: 4x Lips LJ145D waterjet
- Speed: up to 40 knots (74 km/h; 46 mph)
- Capacity: 741 passengers; 200 vehicles

Champion Jet 1 is a high-speed catamaran ferry owned and operated by Seajets. Launched in 1997, she was initially chartered to Condor Ferries as Condor Vitesse for services between Weymouth, the Channel Islands and St Malo. Between 1999 and 2000, she was chartered to Tranz Rail in New Zealand for its Interislander service, marketed as The Lynx, whilst maintaining her Condor name. She returned to Condor Ferries in 2000, which later purchased the ferry outright in 2002. She once again saw use on Channel Island services, as well as summer operations for Brittany Ferries. In 2015, she was sold to Seajets as Champion Jet 1. She was chartered to Naviera Armas between 2018 and 2020, returning to Seajets shortly after. She currently operates in the Aegean Sea.

== History ==
Champion Jet 1 was built in 1997 by Incat, in Hobart, Australia as Incat 044 as a speculative order. She was sent to Europe and arrived in July 1997 at Portland and was later moved to Århus, Denmark. By moving the vessel to Europe, Incat hoped that she would attract a buyer. In late 1997, Condor Ferries announced it would again run services from Weymouth in 1998. The service was to operate to Guernsey and St Malo using the Condor 10 but in March 1998 Condor Ferries announced it would charter the Incat 044 and rename her Condor Vitesse for the new service. The charter had the option to purchase, which was later taken up.

== Routes ==
2026:

14 Sept - 5th Oct.

- Thira-Ios-Naxos-Paros-Syros-Pireaus-Syros-Paros-Mykonos-Naxos-Ios-Thira

25 July – 14 Sept

- Milos-Kimolos-Sifnos-Serifos-Kythnos-Pireaus-Kythnos-Serifos-Sifnos-Kimolos-Milos

28 May - 25 July

- Thira-Ios-Naxos-Paros-Syros-Pireaus-Syros-Paros-Mykonos-Naxos-Ios-Thira

8 April – 22 May & 25 - 27 May 2026

- Rafina-Andros-Tinos-Mykonos-Paros-Mykonos-Tinos-Andros-Rafina

2025:

28 Oct 2025

- Pireaus-Paros-Naxos-Paros-Tinos-Syros-Piraeus

25 Oct 2025

- Pireaus-Tinos-Paros-Naxos-Paros-Piraeus

3 - 19 Oct 2025

- Pireaus-Syros-Mykonos-Naxos-Ios-Santorini-Ios-Naxos-Mykonos-Tinos-Syros-Pireaus (Tinos Sat&Sun only)

30 Sep – 1 Oct 2025

- Pireaus-Serifos-Sifnos-Milos-Sifnos-Serifos-Pireaus

27 Sep 2025

- Milos-Sifnos-Paros-Mykonos-Naxos-Koufonisi-Katapola-Santorini-Naxos -Mykonos-Paros-Sifnos-Milos

18 – 21 Sep 2025

- Milos-Sifnos-Serifos-Pireaus-Serifos-Sifnos-Milos

18 July – 15 Sep 2025

- Milos-Sifnos-Serifos-Kythnos-Pireaus-Kythnos-Serifos-Sifnos-Milos

6 June – 17 July 2025

- Pireaus-Serifos-Sifnos-Milos-Sifnos-Serifos-Pireaus (Double run on Fridays & Sundays 6–22 June)

5 June 2025

- Pireaus-Syros-Mykonos-Naxos-Ios-Santorini-Ios-Naxos-Mykonos-Syros-Tinos-Pireaus

30 May 2025

- Piraeus-Serifos-Sifnos-Milos-Folegandros-Thira-Milos-Sifnos-Serifos-Piraeus

30 April – 16 May 2025

- Pireaus-Syros-Mykonos-Naxos-Ios-Santorini-Ios-Naxos-Mykonos-Syros-Pireaus

4–29 April 2025

- Pireaus-Serifos-Sifnos-Milos-Sifnos-Serifos-Pireaus

2024:

Oct 2024

- Pireaus-Serifos-Sifnos-Milos-Sifnos-Serifos-Pireaus

Sep 2024

- Pireaus-Syros-Tinos-Mykonos-Paros-Naxos-Paros-Pireaus

June – Sep 2024

- Thira-Paros-Mykonos-Syros-Pireaus-Syros-Mykonos-Paros-Naxos-Thira (Monday, Wednesday, Thursday, Saturday)
- Thira-Ios-Naxos-Mykonos-Syros-Pireaus-Syros-Mykonos-Paros-Naxos-Thira (Tuesday, Friday, Sunday)

June 2024

- Pireaus-Paros-Naxos-Thira-Naxos-Paros-Pireaus

May – June 2024

- Thira-Paros-Mykonos-Syros-Pireaus-Syros-Mykonos-Paros-Naxos-Thira (Monday, Wednesday, Thursday, Saturday)
- Thira-Ios-Naxos-Mykonos-Syros-Pireaus-Syros-Mykonos-Paros-Naxos-Thira (Tuesday, Friday, Sunday)

Apr – May 2024

- Pireaus-Serifos-Sifnos-Milos-Sifnos-Serifos-Pireaus

2023:

Oct 2023

- Pireaus-Serifos-Sifnos-Milos-Sifnos-Serifos-Pireaus
- Pireaus-Rhodes-Limassol

Sep 2023 – Oct 2023

- Naxos-Paros-Mykonos-Tinos-Andros-Rafina-Andros-Tinos-Mykonos-Paros-Naxos

June 2023 – Sep 2023

- Pireaus-Paros-Mykonos-Tinos-Andros-Rafina-Andros-Tinos-Mykonos-Naxos-Paros-Pireaus

May 2023 – June 2023

- Pireaus-Mykonos-Paros-Naxos-Paros-Pireaus

Apr 2023 – May 2023

- Pireaus-Serifos-Sifnos-Milos-Sifnos-Serifos-Pireaus (Monday, Wednesday, Thursday & Saturday)
- Pireaus-Syros-Mykonos-Naxos-Santorini-Naxos-Mykonos-Syros-Pireaus (Tuesday, Friday & Sunday)

2022:

Oct 2022

- Pireaus-Serifos-Sifnos-Milos-Sifnos-Serifos-Pireaus

July 2022 – Sep 2022

- Thessaloniki-Lemnos-Mytilini-Lemnos-Thessaloniki (Tuesdays)

June 2022 – Sep 2022

- Thessaloniki-Skiathos-Skopelos-Alonnisos-Mantoudi-Alonnisos-Skopelos-Skiathos-Thessaloniki (Monday, Wednesday, Friday, Saturday & Sunday)

Apr 2022 – June 2022

- Pireaus-Serifos-Sifnos-Milos-Sifnos-Serifos-Pireaus (Daily)

2021:

Oct 2021

- Pireaus-Serifos-Sifnos-Milos-Sifnos-Serifos-Pireaus

From Sep 2021 to Oct 2021

- Heraklion-santorini-Naxos-Mykonos-Paros-Naxos-Ios-Santorini-Heraklion

route from July 2021 to Sep 2021

- Thessaloniki-Skiathos-Skopelos-Alonnisos-Mantoudi-Alonnisos-Skopelos-Skiathos-Thessaloniki

(Mondays, Wednesdays, Friday, Saturday & Sunday)

=== Condor Ferries ===
She operated in 1998 at a reduced passenger capacity of 500 passengers and 90 cars in order to provide space to transfer passengers from the Condor Express Poole-Channel Islands service should the need arise. Condor Express had suffered several mechanical problems during her first year in service in 1997 and also during 1998. These problems meant that the Condor Vitesse had to move to the Poole-Channel Islands service a number of times during that year.

=== Charter to Tranz Rail ===
From December 1999 until April 2000, Condor Vitesse was chartered to Tranz Rail for the Interislander service and carried the marketing name of The Lynx. She returned to Europe for the summer to continue operating for Condor Ferries.

=== Return to Condor Ferries ===
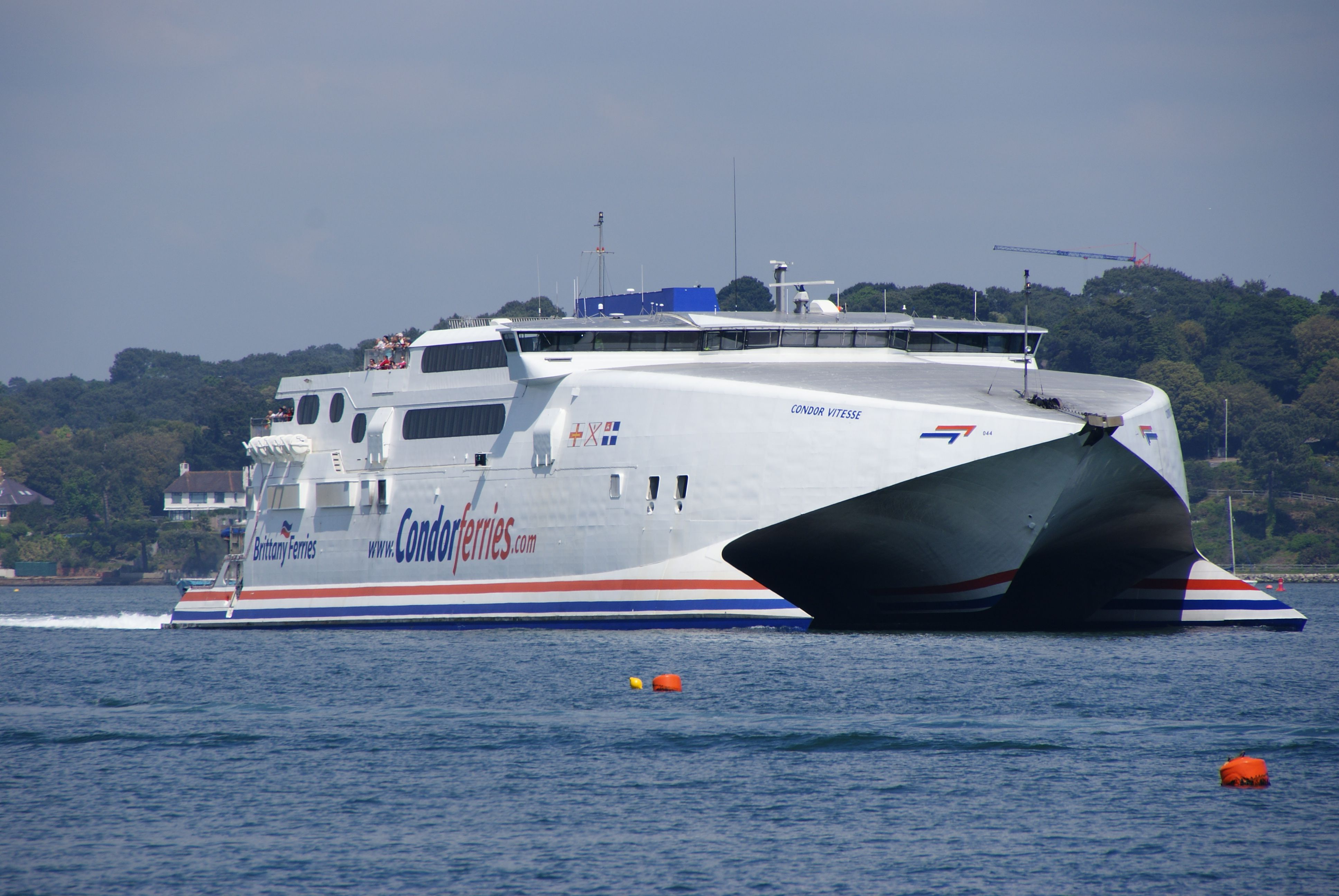
Condor Vitesse approaching Poole Harbour in 2010

In 2001, Condor Ferries and Brittany Ferries entered into an agreement to run a Poole-Cherbourg fastcraft service. Condor Vitesse was chosen for this service, possibly because of her French sounding name, and she began sailing on the route in May 2001, as well as operating for Condor Ferries in the afternoon between Poole and St Malo, calling at one of the Channel Islands on the way. The fastcraft service was a great success, carrying double what was predicted. The summer operation pattern was a morning round trip between Poole and Cherbourg, then an afternoon round trip to St Malo. In 2003, her livery was modified with the application of the new Condor Ferries and Brittany Ferries logos. It was altered again in 2007 when three flags were painted on the ship's side forward of the bridge. The flags are those of Jersey, Guernsey, and St Malo.

=== Seajets ===
On 14 January 2015, it was announced that she would be sold to Greek firm Seajets with her sister-ship Condor Express, owing to her replacement by Condor Liberation. She was delivered to her new owner in late-February 2015, and renamed Champion Jet 1.

== Condor Vitesse in Brittany Ferries marketing ==
Brittany Ferries used a variety of marketing names for the vessel in its publicity and ticketing. The ship has been advertised as Brittany Ferries Condor Vitesse and Vitesse. From 2005 she was referred to as Normandie Vitesse except in the Brittany Ferries information leaflet for the ship which referred to her as Vitesse.

Condor Vitesse carried small Brittany Ferries branding on both sides towards the stern. In Brittany Ferries publicity, the positioning of the Condor and Brittany branding was either reversed, or the Condor branding was removed altogether. Condor Vitesse was the first vessel to carry the current Brittany Ferries logo.

== Accidents and Incidents ==
Condor Vitesse was holed after colliding with the jetty in St Malo on 22 March 2008.

At approximately 0645 UTC on 28 March 2011, she was involved in a collision with a Granville fishing boat, the 9.3 m (31 ft) Les Marquises near the Minquiers whilst en route from St Malo in foggy conditions. Two of the French fishermen were rescued from the water by the ferry's safety boats. The skipper of Les Marquises, 42-year-old Philippe Claude Lesaulnier, was rescued by another fishing boat Joker and transferred to Jersey's lifeboat, but died later the same day in Jersey's hospital. An inquest in Jersey revealed that Lesaulnier died of crush injuries to the upper abdomen, and drowning. He was married with four children.

An investigation began. The French investigator, Renauld Gaudeul, procureur de la République de Coutances said that the speed of the ferry would be of key importance to the investigation. On 19 October 2011, the BEAmer released its report. In summary;

"Condor Vitesse sailed from Saint-Malo in thick fog conditions; the fog horn had been inactivated very early and the visual lookout had not been strengthened. The speed had progressively reached 37 knots. In the wheelhouse almost continuous talks without any link with the watchkeeping, maintained an atmosphere not compatible with the necessary concentration to conduct a HSC in the fog. This behavior, as well as the visibility are the causal factors of the accident. When Condor Vitesse approached the Minquiers waters, both officers did not detect 2 vessel echoes ahead on starboard, the first was a ship that would be passing at a hundred of meters on starboard, the second was Les Marquises. The potter was fishing, with her radar on, without emitting any sound signals. A hand saw the HSC at the last moment but too late to alert the skipper. The collision cut the fishing vessel in two parts, while on board the HSC there was a leak in the starboard bow compartment. The aft part of the potter kept afloat for a time, allowing the two hands to stay on it until they have been rescued by the HSC crew."

On 11 September 2013 the court in Coutances found the Vitesse captain Paul Le Romancer and first officer Yves Tournon (both of whom no longer work for Condor) guilty of manslaughter, involuntary injury and failure to respect maritime regulations. Tournon was later exonerated by the Caen appeal court, which quashed his conviction.

=== 2015 collision with FD Athina ===
While departing the port of Piraeus, the vessel collided with the hydrofoil Flying Dolphin Athina. The ship was en route to Sifnos, Milos, and Santorini carrying 307 passengers, while the Flying Dolphin Athina was bound for Agistri and Aegina with 60 passengers on board.

No injuries were reported on either vessel, though one of the ferries sustained minor damage. Following the incident, maritime authorities launched an investigation to assess the damage and determine the cause of the collision.

==== 2023 collision with Ekaterini P. ====
On 2 June 2023, during the midday hours,the vessel made minor contact with the moored ferry Ekaterini P. while performing docking maneuvers at the port of Tinos. At the time of the incident, the ship was executing a scheduled itinerary from Rafina to Andros, Tinos, Mykonos, Naxos, Paros,and Piraeus, carrying 686 passengers. The Ekaterini P. was operating a route from Naxos to Mykonos, Tinos, and Rafina with 217 passengers on board.

The vessel safely completed its mooring operations following the contact, and no injuries or marine pollution were reported. The Tinos Port Authority conducted a preliminary investigation and cleared both ships to resume their scheduled voyages after their respective classification societies issued certificates maintaining their class.

== Sister ships ==
- Champion Jet 2
- Champion Jet 3
- Tarifa Jet
