= Seajets =

Ferry company of Greece

- Trade name: SEAJETS
- Type: Private
- Industry: Shipping; Tourism; Hospitality; Transportation
- Founded: 1989
- Founder: Panagiotis & Marios Iliopoulos
- Headquarters: Piraeus, Greece
- Area served: Aegean Sea
- Key people: Marios Iliopoulos (owner)
- Products: Ferries
- Services: Passenger transportation, Freight transportation
- Website: www.seajets.gr

Seajets is a Greek ferry company that operates a fleet of passenger and freight ferry services in the Aegean Sea. Operating a fleet of 29 vessels, Seajets sails to 17 islands and offers 140 connections among them, primarily between April and October each year.

== History ==
Seajets was founded in 1989 as Dolphin Sea Lines by Panagiotis ("Takis") Iliopoulos and his son Marios Iliopoulos.

In 2018 Seajets received the ”Passenger Line of the Year” award in the 15th “Lloyd's List Greek Shipping Awards 2018” and in 2019 the WorldChampion Jet was awarded “ship of the year” during the Lloyd's List Greek Shipping Awards 2019 ceremony.

In 2020 the company bought seven cruise ships, two of which were soon resold for demolition.

In November 2025, the Goddess of the Night was sold for €140 million to Chinese cruise line operator, Tianjin Orient International Cruises.

== Fleet ==
As of March 2026, the Seajets fleet consists of the following vessels:

=== Multi-hull ===
Name	Flag	Built	Gross tonnage	Length/Width	Pax/Cars	Knots	Notes
Worldchampion Jet	Cyprus	2000	6,402 GT	84 m / 25 m	1,055/215	50	Austal, Australia. Hull 096.
Tera Jet 2	Cyprus	2007	10,841 GT	112 m / 30.5 m	1350/280	40	Incat, Australia, Hull 064.
Tera Jet 3	Cyprus	2008	10,841 GT	112 m / 30.5 m	1350/280	40	Incat, Australia, Hull 065. Stopped in Salamina.
Champions League Jet 1	Cyprus	2007	6,133 GT	88 m / 24 m	1,200/225	45	Austal, Australia. Hull 294.
Champions League Jet 2	Cyprus	2007	6,133 GT	88 m / 24 m	1,200/225	45	Austal, Australia. Hull 294.
Eurochampion Jet	Cyprus	1998	5,617 GT	91 m / 26 m	1,000/200	43	Incat, Australia. Hull 048.
Eurochampion Jet 2	Cyprus	1998	5,617 GT	91 m / 26 m	1,000/200	43	Incat, Australia. Hull 049.
Olympic Champion Jet	Greece	2005	4,913 GT	85 m / 21 m	1,160/117	43	Austal, Australia. Hull 285. On long-term charter from Minoan Lines.
Hyperspeed Jet 4	Greece	2000	4,913 GT	92.5 m / 24 m	1,050/188	40	Austal, Australia. Hull 97.
Champion Jet 1	Cyprus	1997	5,005 GT	87 m / 26 m	1,000/200	40	Incat, Australia. Hull 044.
Champion Jet 2	Cyprus	1996	5,005 GT	87 m / 26 m	1,000/200	40	Incat, Australia. Hull 042.
Champion Jet 3	Cyprus	1997	5,005 GT	87 m / 26 m	1,000/200	40	Incat, Australia. Hull 045.
Power Jet	Cyprus	1996	5,541 GT	82.3 m / 23 m	800/175	40	Austal, Australia. Hull 046.
Elite Jet	Cyprus	1996	4,114 GT	81.2 m / 26.5 m	670/150	35	Incat, Tasmania. Hull 040.
Speedlink Jet	Cyprus	2003	3,424 GT	72 m / 18 m	400/65	40	Derecktor Shipyard, Connecticut. Refitting in Salamina.
Giga Jet	Cyprus	1999	5,528 GT	96 m / 27 m	750/230	43	Incat, Australia. Hull 051. Laid up in Agios Konstantinos.
Super Jet	Greece	1995	493 GT	42 m / 10 m	394/0	38	Oskarshamn, Sweden.
Super Jet 2	Greece	1998	499 GT	42 m / 10 m	386/0	38	Båtservice, Norway. Originally Sea Jet 2.
Express Jet	Cyprus	1999	908 GT	52 m / 26 m	366/0	38	Austal, USA. Hull 079. Former Sifnos Jet.
Supercat Jet	Greece	2000	636 GT	45.5 m / 12 m	400/0	38	Former Super Cat for Golden Star Ferries.
Superspeed Jet 1	Cyprus	2009	700 GT	47 m / 12 m	417/0	42	Austal, Australia. Hull 350. Former Marco Polo for Cotai Jet.
Superspeed Jet 2	Cyprus	2009	700 GT	47 m / 12 m	417/0	42	Austal, Australia. Hull 351. Former St. Mark for Cotai Jet.
Superspeed Jet 3	Greece	1998	613 GT	47.7 m / 11.8 m	340/0	45	Former Flying Cat 3. Refitting in Salamina.
Superspeed Jet 4	Greece	1999	794 GT	55.1 m / 13 m	440/0	45	Former Flying Cat 4.
Eagle Jet 1	Greece	1996	496 GT	40 m / 10 m	340/0	30	Former Flying Cat 5. Laid up in Salamina.
Eagle Jet 2	Greece	1997	496 GT	40 m / 10 m	340/0	30	Former Flying Cat 6.
Notre Dame	Cyprus	2001	850 GT	52 m / 15 m	400/0	35	Former Super Speed for Golden Star Ferries. Laid up in Salamina.
Mega Jet	Greece	1995	3,989 GT	77.5 m / 26 m	845/100	30	Incat, Australia. Hull 035. Laid up in Chalkis.
Naxos Jet	Greece	1991	3,003 GT	74 m / 26 m	700/75	32	Incat, Tasmania. Hull 028. Laid up in Kalamata.
Speed Jet	Cyprus	1996	5,541 GT	82.3 m / 23 m	650/175	35	Austal, Australia. Hull 052. Former Croazia Jet. Laid up in Chalkis.
Andros Jet	Cyprus	1997	2,695 GT	60 m / 17.5 m	450/94	30	Austal, Australia. Hull 055. Laid up in Chalkis.
Caldera Vista	Greece	1991	3,003 GT	74 m / 26 m	700/75	30	Incat, Australia. Hull 026. Laid up in Kalamata.
Cat	Greece	1990	3,003 GT	74 m / 26 m	700/75	30	Incat, Australia. Hull 023. Laid up in Chalkis.
High Speed Jet	Greece	1990	3,003 GT	74 m / 26 m	700/75	30	Incat, Australia. Hull 025. Laid up in Chalkis.

=== Monohull ===
Name	Flag	Built	Gross tonnage	Length/Width	Pax/Cars	Knots	Notes
Speedrunner Jet	Greece	1999	4,465 GT	100.4 m / 17.1 m	800/160	40	Fincantieri Riva Trigoso. Italy Hull 6003.
Speedrunner Jet 2	Greece	1998	4,465 GT	100.4 m / 17.1 m	800/175	40	Fincantieri Riva Trigoso. Italy Hull 5999.
SuperRunner Jet	Greece	1999	4,465 GT	100.4 m / 17.1 m	800/160	40	Fincantieri Riva Trigoso. Italy Hull 6004.
SuperRunner Jet II	Cyprus	1999	5,632 GT	112.5 m / 16.1 m	700/140	35	Alstom Leroux Naval - France - Hull 822. Stopped at Drapetsona as reserve.
Tera Jet	Cyprus	1999	11,347 GT	145 m / 22 m	1,750/350	45	Fincantieri Riva Trigoso, Italy. Laid up in Perama.
Paros Jet	Cyprus	1996	3,560 GT	103 m / 14.5 m	850/150	35	Industrie Navali Meccaniche Affini, TMV 103 Aquastrada class, Italy. Laid up in Salamina.
Express	Cyprus	1997	3,560 GT	103 m / 14.5 m	850/150	35	Industrie Navali Meccaniche Affini, TMV 103 Aquastrada class, Italy. Laid up in Astakos.
Fertiti	Antigua and Barbuda	1997	3,560 GT	95 m / 16 m	600/170	35	Fincantieri Riva Trigoso. Italy Hull 6005. Laid up in Agios Kostantinos.
Apri	Comoros	1999	11,347 GT	145 m / 22 m	1,750/350	45	Fincantieri Riva Trigoso, Italy. Former Capricorn. Laid up in Avlida.

=== Conventional ferries ===
Name	Flag	Built	Gross tonnage	Length	Width	Passengers	Cars	Knots	Notes
Aqua Blue	Greece	1975	12,891 GT	137 m	22 m	1,300	400	20	Kanda Shipbuilding, Japan, Hull 197. Former Green Arch.
Aqua Jewel	Greece	2003	3,934 GT	109 m	16.8 m	795	155	18	Hellas, Greece, Hull 533.
Iolkos	Greece	1996	1,996 GT	77.9 m	22 m	1,225	175	18.5	Former Express Skiathos. Acquired from Hellenic Seaways in 2024.
Sporades Star	Greece	1975	7,657 GT	114.55 m	18.61 m	1,200	220	19	Former Moby Love. Acquired in 2021.
SuperStar	Greece	1974	4,986 GT	122 m	19 m	1,630	250	20	Former Superferry II. Bought from Golden Star Ferries in 2021.
SuperStar II	Cyprus	1985	19,763 GT	137 m	24 m	1,460	340	18	Former Color Viking. Bought from Color Line in 2022.

== Routes ==
Summer 2026 scheduled routes operated by conventional ferry and high-speed ferries are:

Conventional ferries:

- Volos ↔ Skiathos ↔ Skopelos ↔ Alonnisos: SuperStar II
- Rafina ↔ Andros ↔ Tinos ↔ Mykonos: SuperStar
- Lavrio ↔ Agios Efstratios ↔ Mirina ↔ Kavala: Aqua Blue
- Piraeus ↔ Kythira ↔ Antikythira ↔ Kissamos - Antikythira ↔ Kythira ↔ Gythion: Aqua Jewel

High-speed ferries:

- Piraeus ↔ Syros ↔ Tinos ↔ Mykonos ↔ Paros ↔ Naxos ↔ Santorini ↔ Heraklion: Champions League Jet 1 & Champions League Jet 2 (Alternatively)
- Rafina ↔ Andros ↔ Tinos ↔ Mykonos: Eurochampion Jet
- Piraeus ↔ Paros ↔ Naxos ↔ Koufonisi ↔ Katapola: Finished For 2026
- Santorini - Ios - Naxos - Paros - Syros - Piraeus - Syros - Mykonos - Paros - Naxos - Ios - Santorini: Finished for 2026
- Piraeus - Syros - Mykonos - Naxos - Ios - Santorini - Ios - Naxos - Mykonos - Tinos - Syros - Piraeus: Eurochampion Jet 2
- Piraeus - Milos - Folegandros - Sikinos - Ios - Santorini - Folegandros - Milos - Sifnos - Serifos - Piraeus: Finished for 2026
- Piraeus ↔ Serifos ↔ Sifnos ↔ Milos: Champion Jet 2
- Milos ↔ Kimolos ↔ Sifnos ↔ Serifos ↔ Kythnos ↔ Piraeus: Finished for 2026

(Weekends only)

- Rafina ↔ Andros ↔ Tinos ↔ Mykonos: Finished For 2026
- Piraeus ↔ Paros ↔ Naxos ↔ Koufonisi: Finished For 2026
- Thessaloniki ↔ Skiathos ↔ Skopelos ↔ Alonnisos ↔ Glossa (Skopelos) ↔ Skiathos ↔ Mantoudi: Finished For 2026
- Mantoudi - Glossa (Skopelos) - Skiathos - Volos - Skiathos - Glossa (Skopelos) - Skopelos - Alonnisos - Glossa (Skopelos) - Skiathos - Mantoudi: Finished For 2026
- Naxos ↔ Paros ↔ Mykonos ↔ Tinos ↔ Andros ↔ Rafina: Champion Jet 3
- Rethymno ↔ Santorini: Elite Jet (tue, sat)
- Paros - Mykonos - Paros - Santorini - Katapola - Koufonisi - Naxos - Paros - Mykonos - Paros - Sifnos - Milos: Super Jet & Super Jet 2 (Alternatively)
- Milos - Sifnos - Paros - Sifnos - Milos - Sifnos - Paros - Mykonos - Naxos - Koufonisi - Katapola - Santorini - Ios - Naxos - Paros: Super Jet & Super Jet 2 (Alternatively)
- Heraklion ↔ Santorini:↔ Naxos ↔ Paros ↔ Mykonos ↔ Syros ↔ Tinos ↔ Piraeus Athens From 03 APRIL 2027
- Paros - Ios - Santorini - Mykonos - Naxos - Santorini - Ios - Paros: Finished For 2026
- Alonnisos ↔ Skopelos ↔ Glossa (Skopelos) ↔ Skiathos ↔ Volos: Eagle Jet 2

=== Cruise ships ===
Seajets currently has three ships with an unknown future, as all three are in cold lay-up.

Ship name	Flag	Built	Gross tonnage	IMO	Length	Width	Passengers	Knots	Notes	Image
Aegean Majesty	Bermuda	1996	57,092 GT	9102992	219.4 m	30.80 m	1,350	21	Fincantieri, Italy. In cold lay-up at Aigio.	MS Aegean Majesty as Veendam
Queen of the Oceans	Bermuda	2000	77,499 GT	9169550	261.3 m	32.25 m	2,016	21	Fincantieri, Italy. In cold lay-up at Platygiali, Astakos.	MV Queen Of The Oceans as Oceana
Majesty of the Oceans	Bahamas	1992	73,941 GT	8819512	270 m	32.00 m	2,767	22.0	Chantiers de l'Atlantique, France. In cold lay-up at Elefsina bay.	Majesty of the Seas (For RCCL)

=== Former cruise ships ===
In 2020, Seajets also acquired the following cruise ships, two of which were resold for scrapping and three for further service.

Ship name	Flag	Built	Gross tonnage	IMO	Length	Width	Passengers	Knots	Notes	Photo Of The Ships
Goddess of the Night	Bermuda	2004	102,784 GT	9239795	272 m	35.50 m	2,718	20.0	Fincantieri, Italy. Previously with Costa Cruises (2004–2023). After drydocking at İÇDAŞ, was to enter service as Goddess of the Night for Neonyx Cruises in 2024. Eventually it was sold to Tianjin Orient International Cruise Line in November 2025 and renamed Vision.	Mykonos Magic in Eleusis, 2024
Aegean Goddess	Bermuda	1994	55,819 GT	8919269	219.4 m	30.80 m	1,258	22	Fincantieri, Italy. In February 2023, it was sold to Celestyal Cruises and will sail under the name Celestyal Journey.	Aegean Goddess as Ryndam
Aegean Myth	Bermuda	1993	55,575 GT	9102992	219.4 m	30.80 m	1,258	22	Fincantieri, Italy. In August 2022, it was sold to a new French start up, Compagnie Française De Croisières and will sail under the name Renaissance.	Aegean Myth as Maasdam
Magellan	Comoros	1985	46,052 GT	8217881	222 m	32.20 m	1,452	21.0	Previously with Cruise & Maritime Voyages. Arrived in Alang, India for scrap in January 2021.	Magellan
Columbus	Comoros	1988	63,500 GT	8611398	247 m	32.00 m	1,856	21.5	Chantiers de l'Atlantique, France. Sold for scrap.	Columbus

== Gallery ==
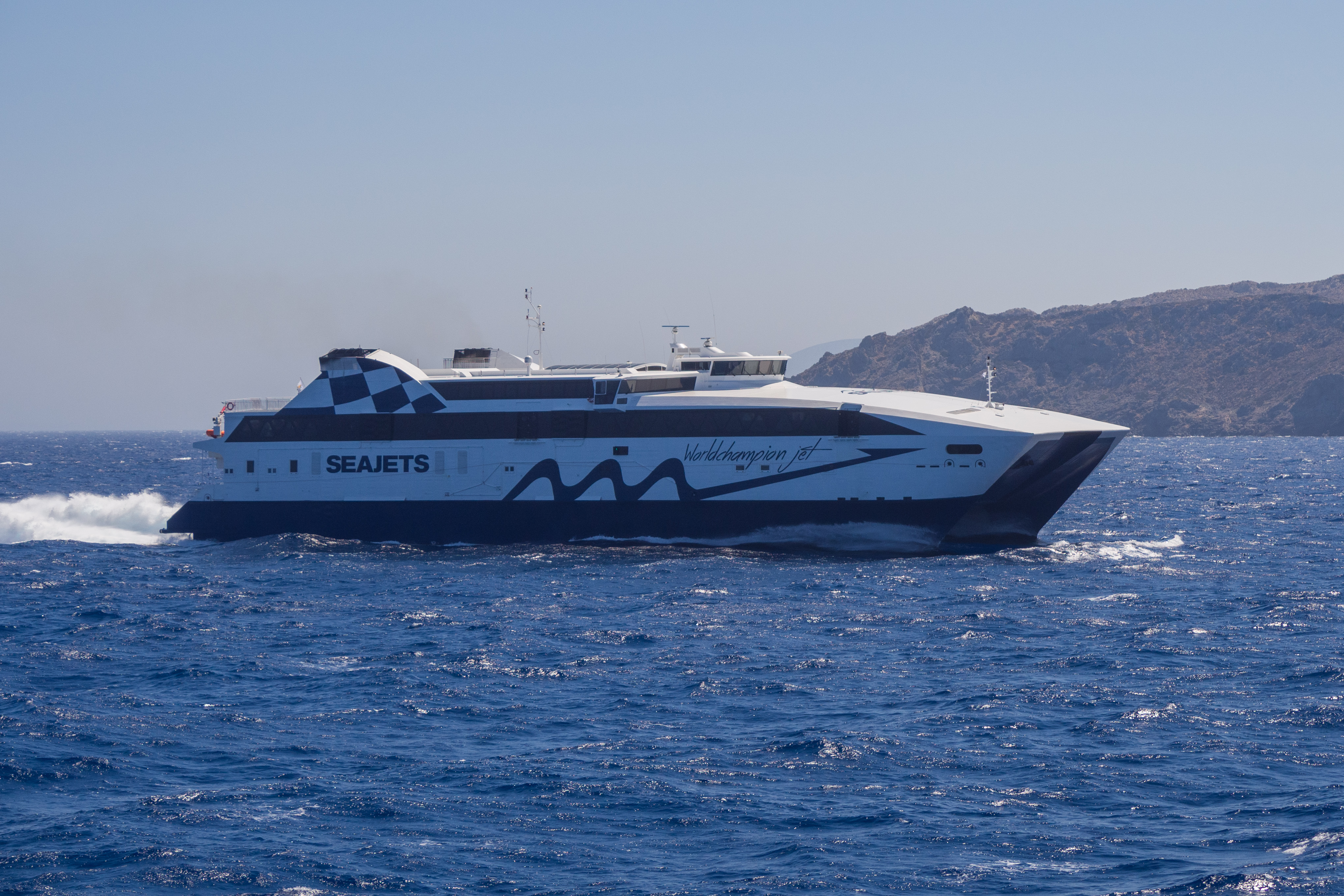
WorldChampion Jet

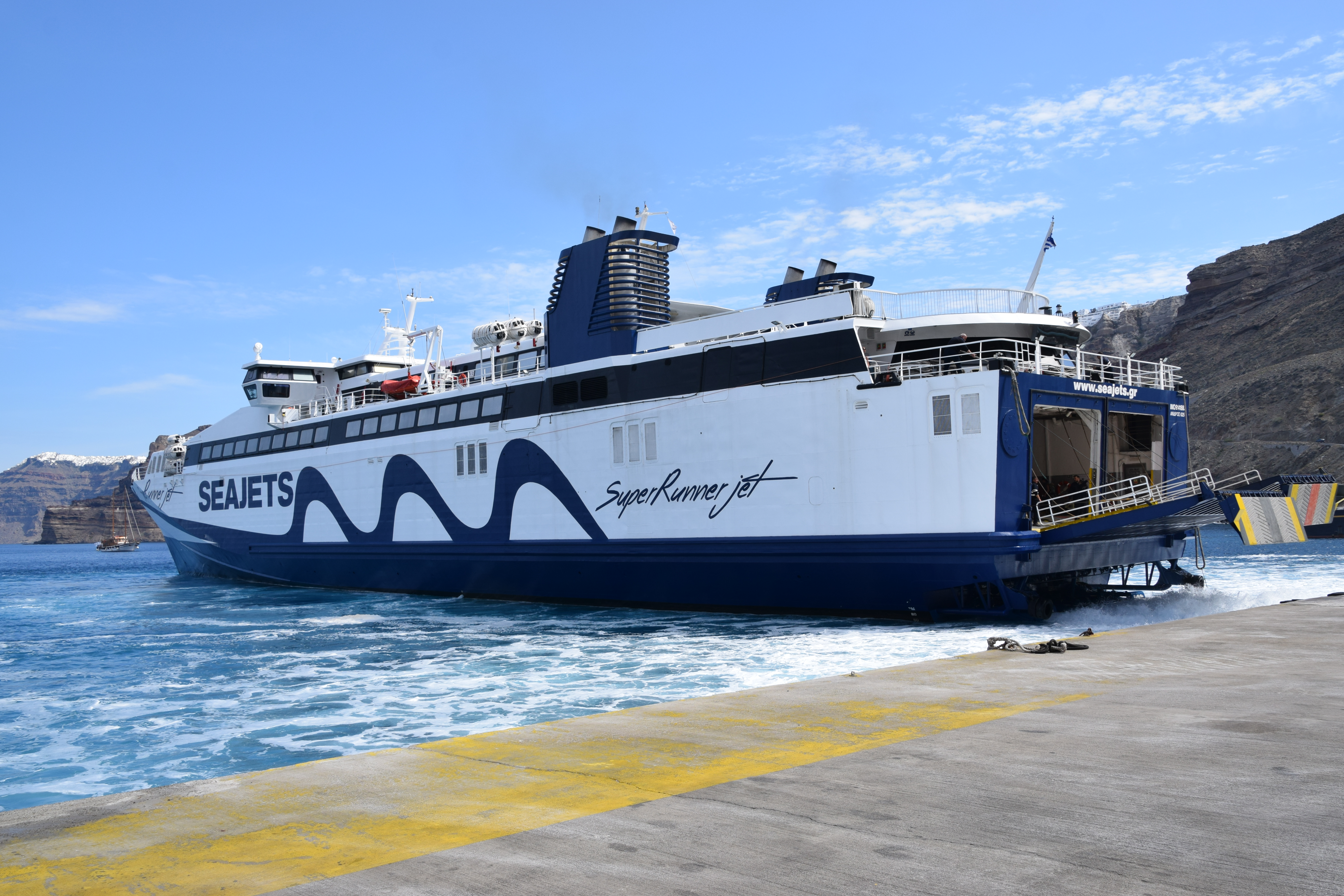
SuperRunner Jet

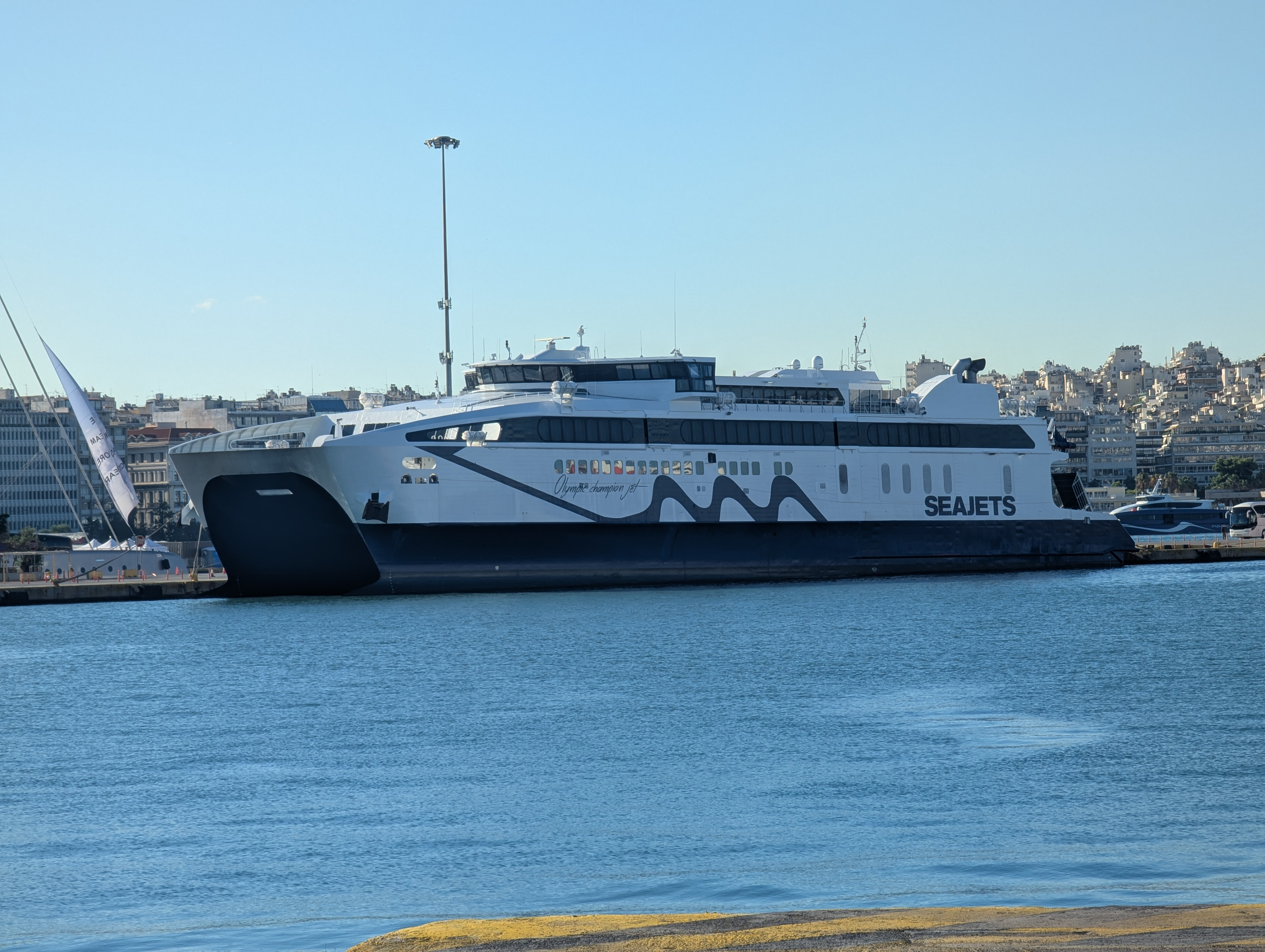
Olympic Champion Jet

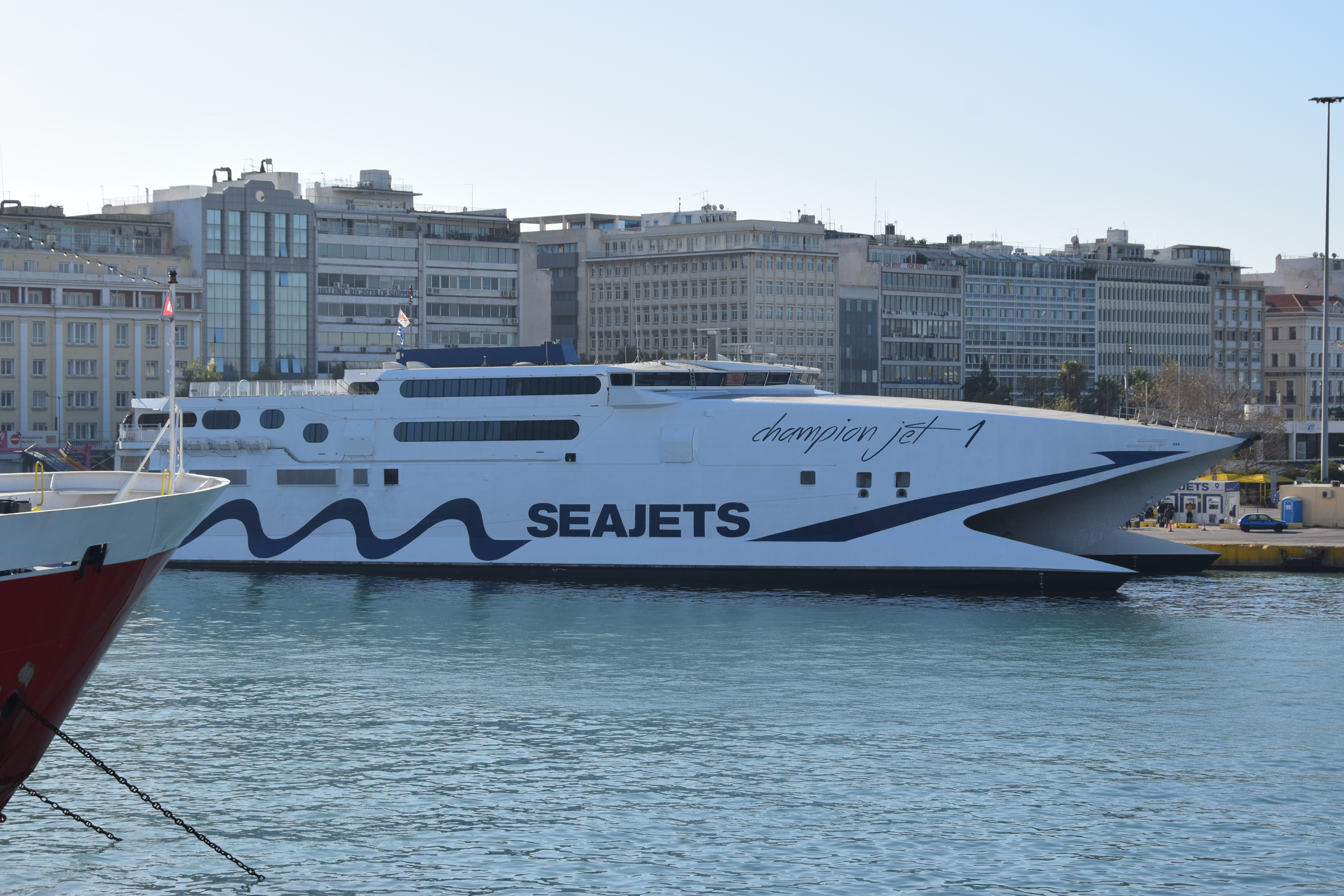
Champion Jet 1

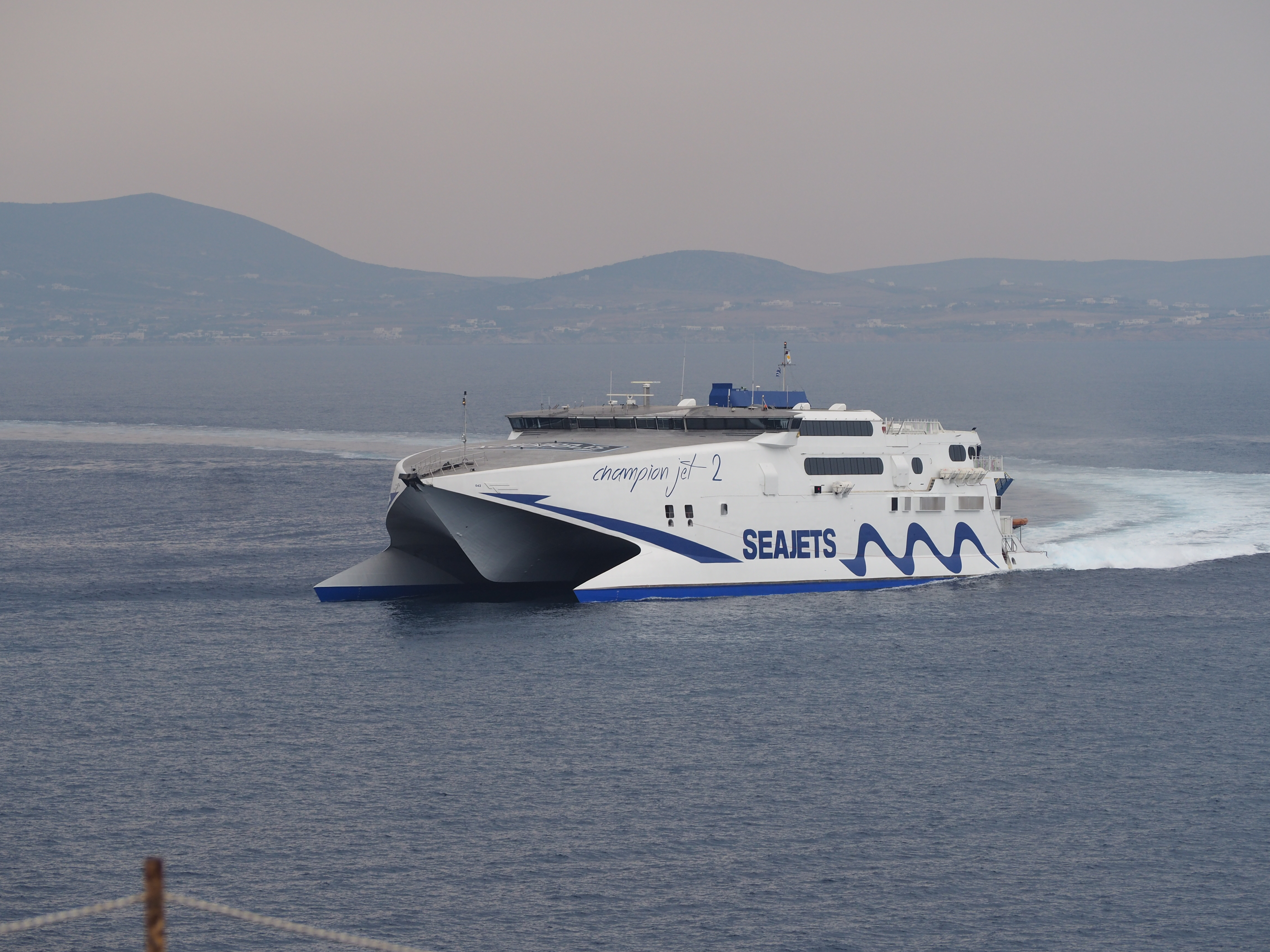
Champion Jet 2

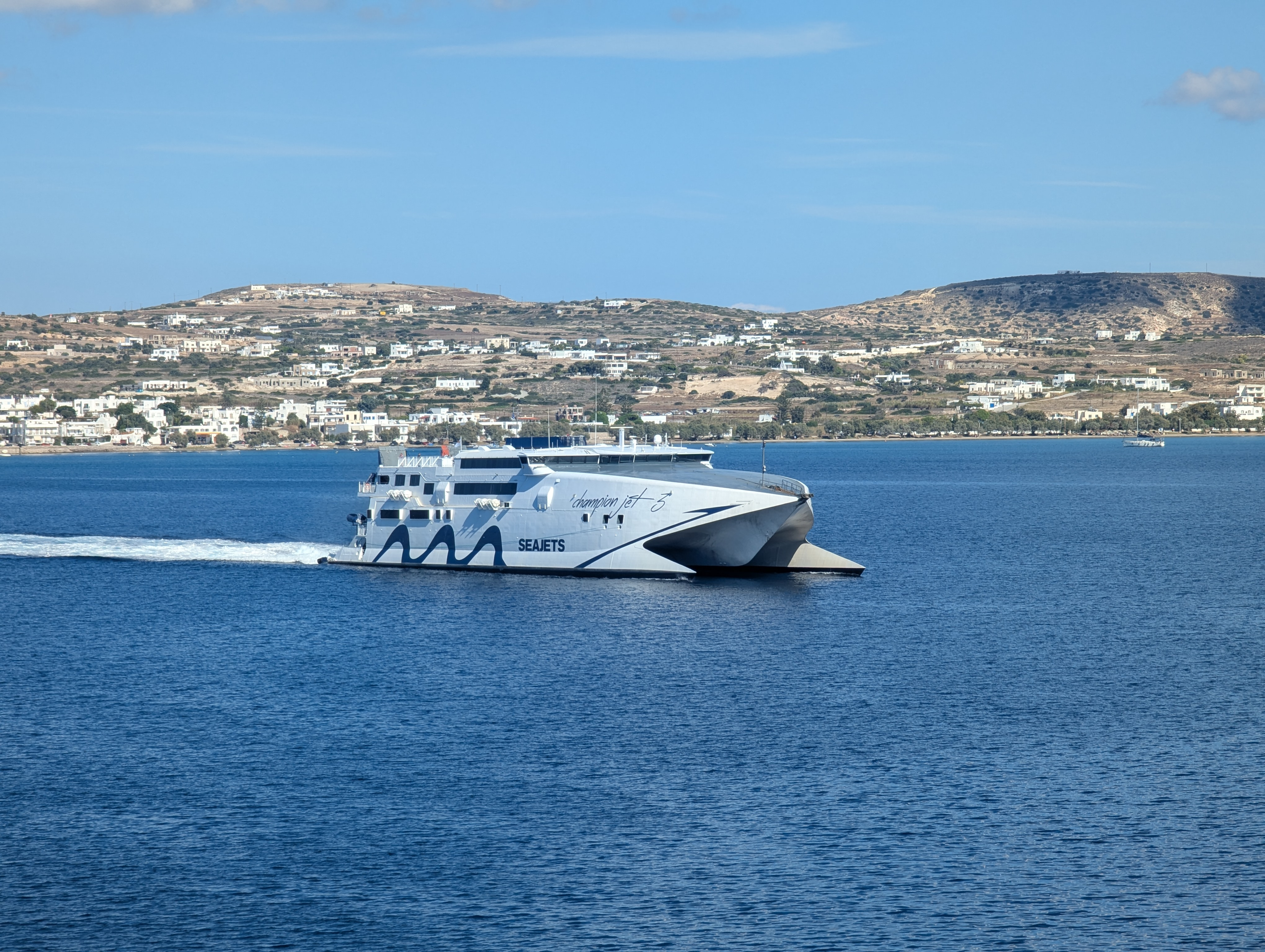
Champion Jet 3

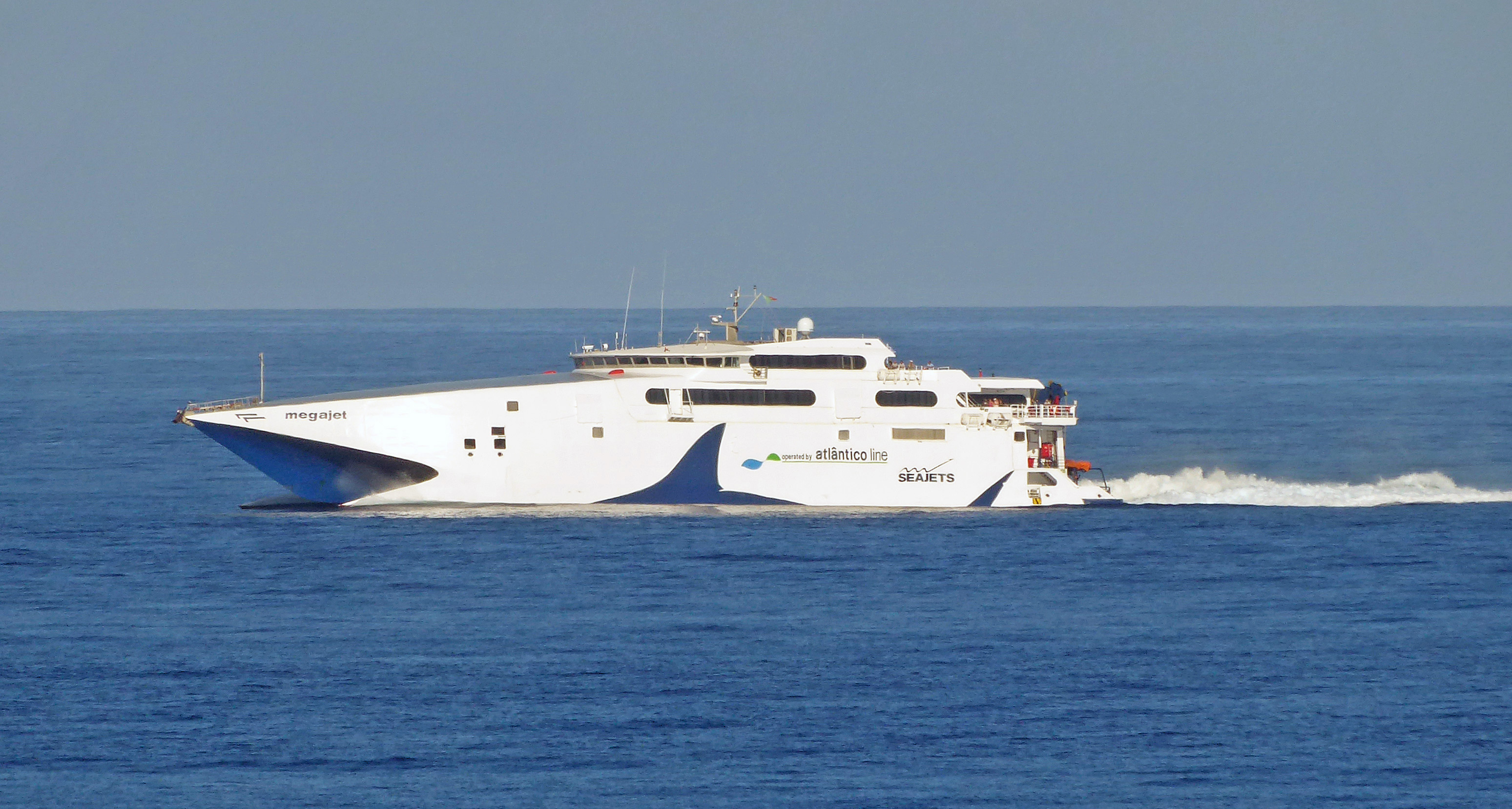
Mega Jet

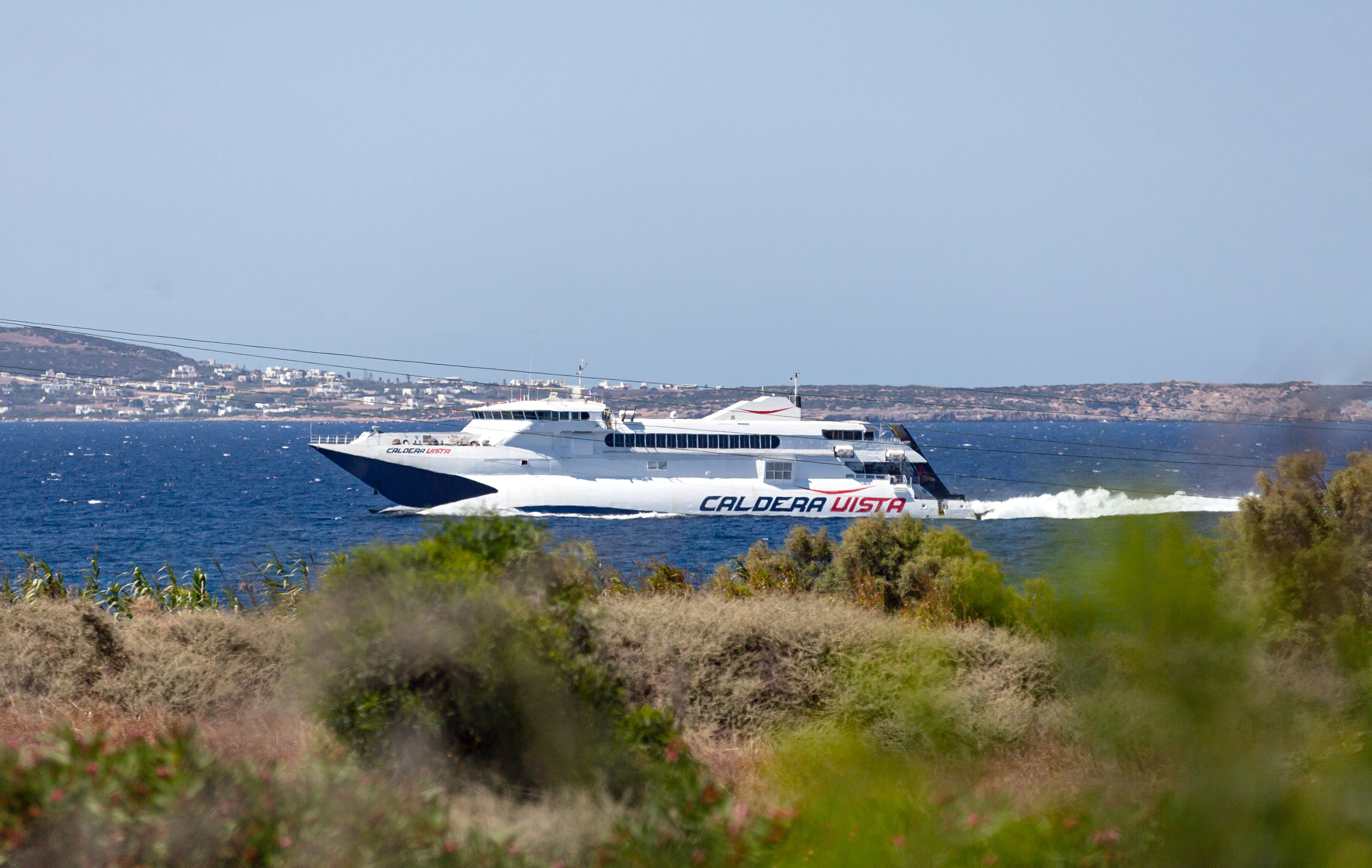
Caldera Vista

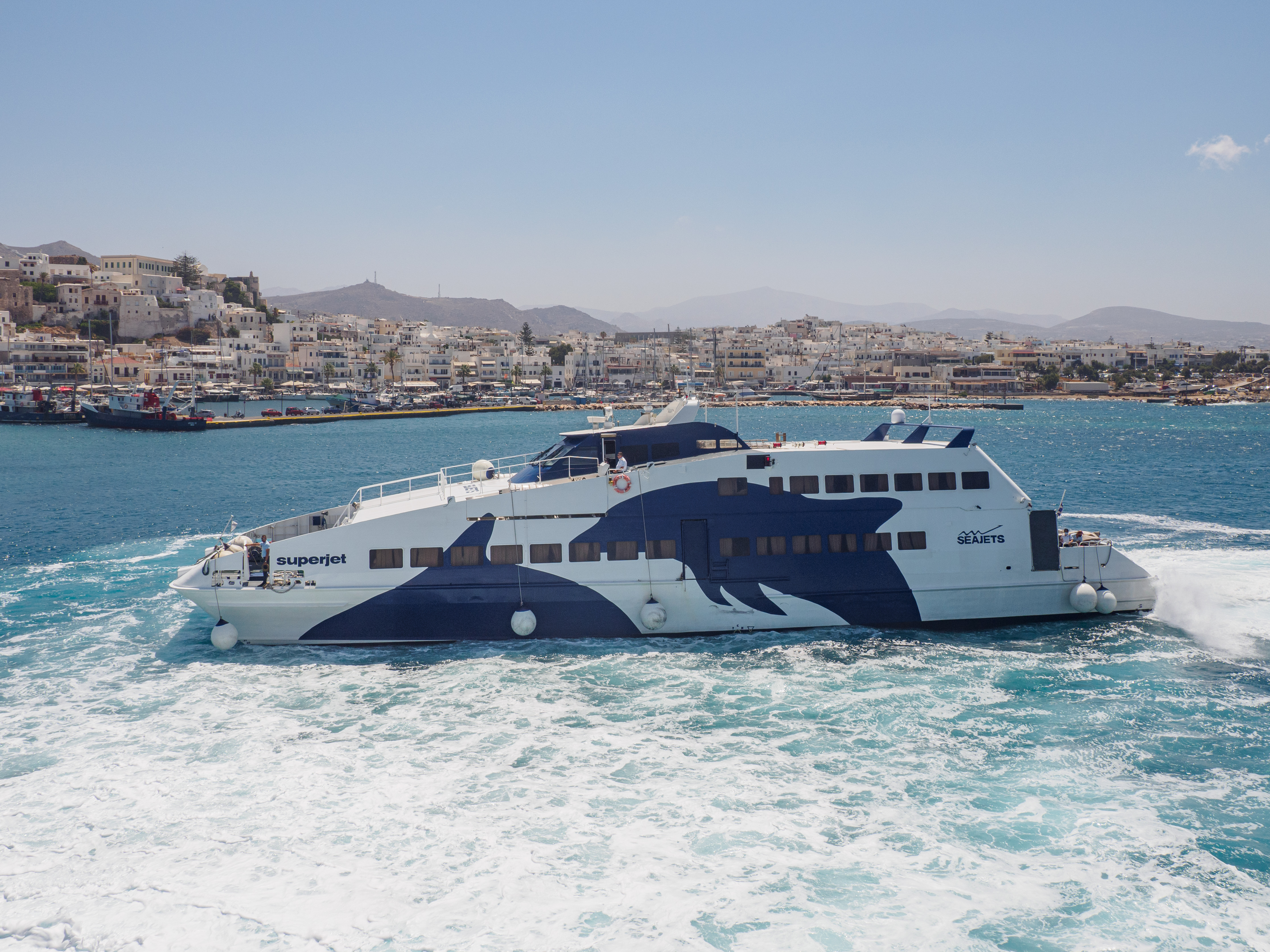
Super Jet

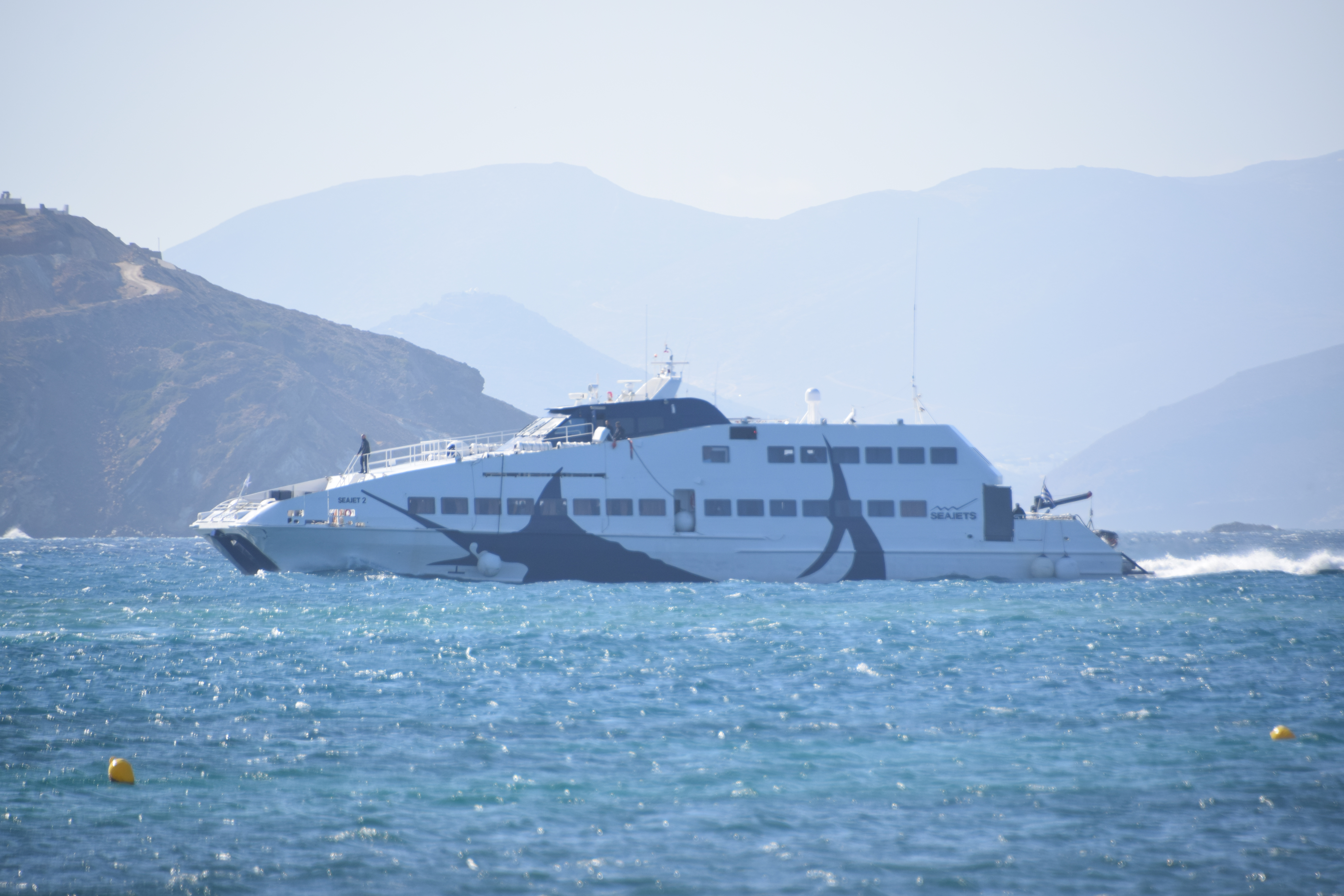
Super Jet 2 as Seajet 2
