= HSC Aries =

Scrapped Fast Ferry

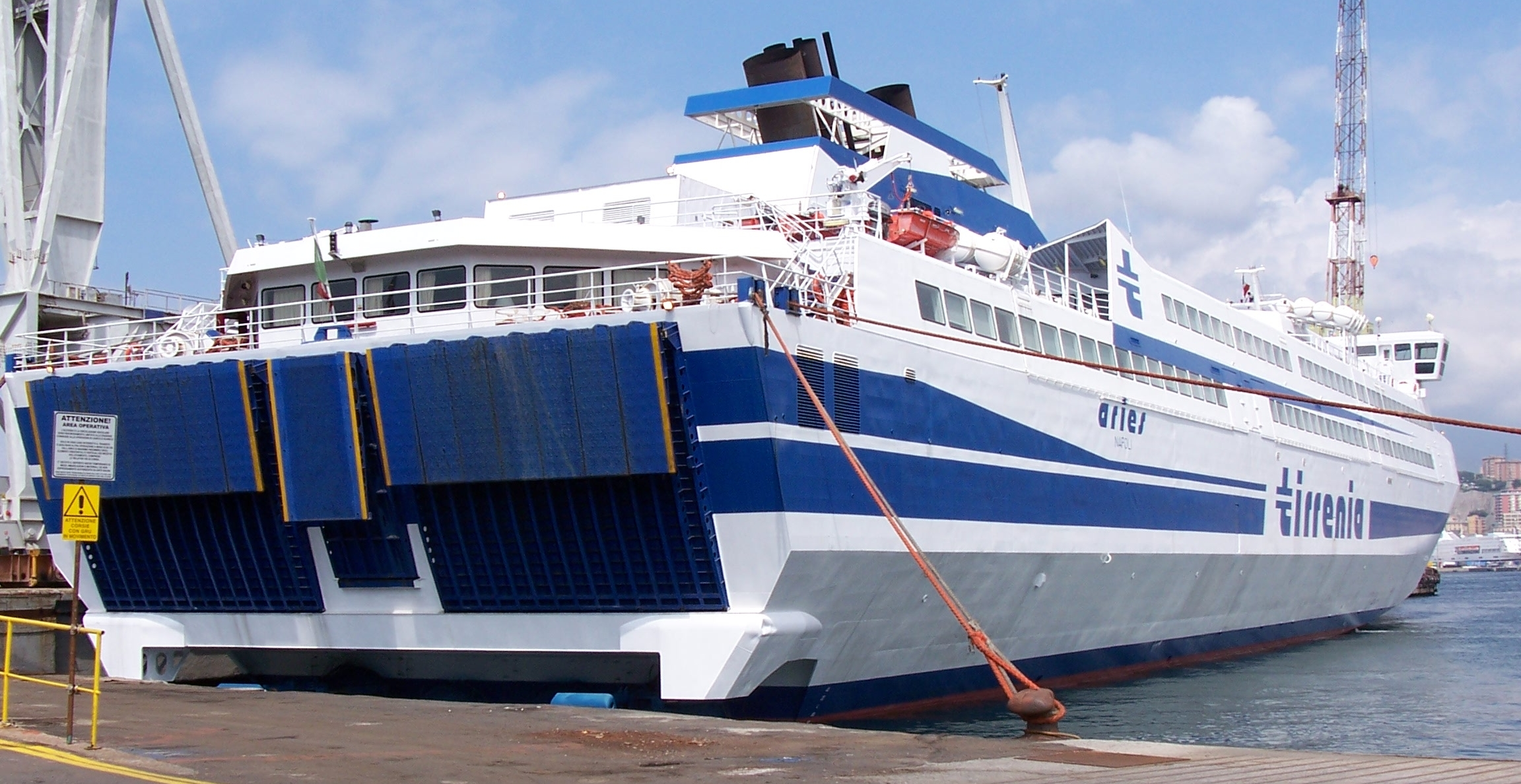
- Aries in Genoa

History
- Name: Aries
- Owner: (1998–2011): Tirrenia di Navigazione; (2011): Karina Shipping Ltd
- Operator: Tirrenia di Navigazione
- Port of registry: (1998–2011): Naples, Italy; (2011): Togo, Togo
- Route: Civitavecchia – Olbia (1998, 2003); Genoa – Olbia / Porto Torres (1999–2002)
- Ordered: September 1996
- Builder: Fincantieri; Riva Trigoso, Genoa, Italy
- Yard number: 6008
- Laid down: September 1996
- Launched: January 1998
- Completed: 29 May 1998
- Maiden voyage: 16 June 1998
- In service: June 1998
- Out of service: 2003
- Identification: IMO number: 9144275; Call sign: IBGU
- Fate: Sold for demolition in May 2011; arrived at Aliağa, Turkey, for scrapping on 18 August 2011.
- Status: Scrapped

General characteristics
- Class & type: Jupiter MDV 3000 (Monohull)
- Tonnage: 11,347 GT; 1,200 DWT
- Length: 145.6 m (477 ft 8 in)
- Beam: 22.0 m (72 ft 2 in)
- Draft: 3.99 m (13 ft 1 in)
- Decks: 6 (3 passenger decks, 3 vehicle decks)
- Ramps: 2 Rear Ro-Ro stern loading ramps
- Installed power: 4 × MTU 20V 1163 diesel engines; 2 × General Electric/Fiat LM2500 gas turbines (total 68,000 kW)
- Propulsion: 4 × KaMeWa waterjets (2 steering side-jets, 2 fixed center-boosters)
- Speed: 40.0 knots (74.1 km/h; 46.0 mph) (service) 42.0 knots (77.8 km/h; 48.3 mph) (max)
- Capacity: 1,800 passengers; 460 cars
- Crew: 34
- Notes: Constructed with a deep-V aluminum alloy hull and equipped with an active fin stabilization system.

Aries was a ferry, owned from 1998 to 2011 by the Italian shipping company Tirrenia di Navigazione, as well as the first single-hull in the world, together with its twins, capable of reaching 40 knots and exceeding 1,000 tons of deadweight.

== Design details ==
Aries was a monohull constructed almost entirely of aluminum alloy, with only the parts subjected to high mechanical stress made of special steels. To give the ship excellent seaworthiness, the hull profile was of the deep V type. Two pairs of active stabilizing fins, controlled by onboard software, kept the ship's roll and yaw under control.

The ferry was organized on six decks. Three (the main deck, the upper deck, and the observation deck) were used for passenger transport, and three (the lower garage, the main garage, and the upper garage) were used for vehicle transport. The upper garage deck was liftable.

1. The main deck housed: Reception, Bar and 1208 second class seats.
2. The upper deck housed: 576 first class seats
3. The belvedere bridge housed a bar

Passengers boarded via a special ramp at the stern to reach the main garage. The garage was then connected to the passenger decks by stairs and two elevators, each with a capacity of 12 passengers. There were 34 crew spaces.

The ship was capable of carrying 460 motor vehicles. The three garage decks were loaded simultaneously. When carrying trucks, the capacity was 30 trucks plus 100 cars (mainly housed in the lower garage). The two stern ramps were designed to load and unload 45-ton trucks (15 per axle). Hydraulic lifting systems allowed the garage's upper bulkhead to be raised to 4.4 meters. The ships in this series do not have bow doors, and all loading and unloading operations are carried out through the two stern doors, requiring a U-turn when exiting. Furthermore, the ferry was designed to be completely evacuated in less than 15 minutes.

== Engine details ==
The ferry's propulsion system consisted of two Ford General Electric / Fiat Avio LM2500 gas turbines (21,000 kW) and four MTU 20V1163TB 73-liter diesel engines (6,500 kW), for a total power output of 67,000 kW. The LM2500 series gas turbines are a derivative of the Ford General Electric CF6-6 aircraft turbine and are frequently used in warships, hydrofoils, hovercraft, and other vessels of this class. The LM2500 gas turbines drive the center waterjet boosters, two KaMeWa 180 SII, while twin diesel engines drive the port and starboard waterjets, two KaMeWa 140 SII. The pairs of boosters are fixed, while the side waterjets can rotate to act as rudders. The twin waterjet engines with directional control were, at the time of construction, the largest ever built in the world. The flexible configuration of the propulsion system allows the vessel to operate at three speeds. The system is capable of propelling the vessel to over 40 knots, although it is typically used to provide 90% of the total power.

== Service ==
Launched in January 1998 by Fincantieri of Riva Trigoso and deployed on the Civitavecchia - Olbia route that summer (along with her sister ship Taurus), her top speed of 42 knots allowed her to cover the route in just over three hours. In 2003, the vessel was decommissioned after only five years of service, as this type of ferry proved uneconomical due to its extremely high fuel consumption (approximately 290 kg of diesel per minute), its lack of versatility, and, above all, growing competition in the maritime sector.

Selling them also proved difficult. Catamarans, which were more stable and had lower operating costs, were preferred to this type of ferry. One interested buyer was the U.S. Navy, but the parties could not agree on a price. The vessel was eventually sold for scrapping in Turkey, arriving in Aliağa in August 2011.

== Sister ships ==
- Tera Jet
- Apri
- Taurus
