= Andros Jet =

High speed craft

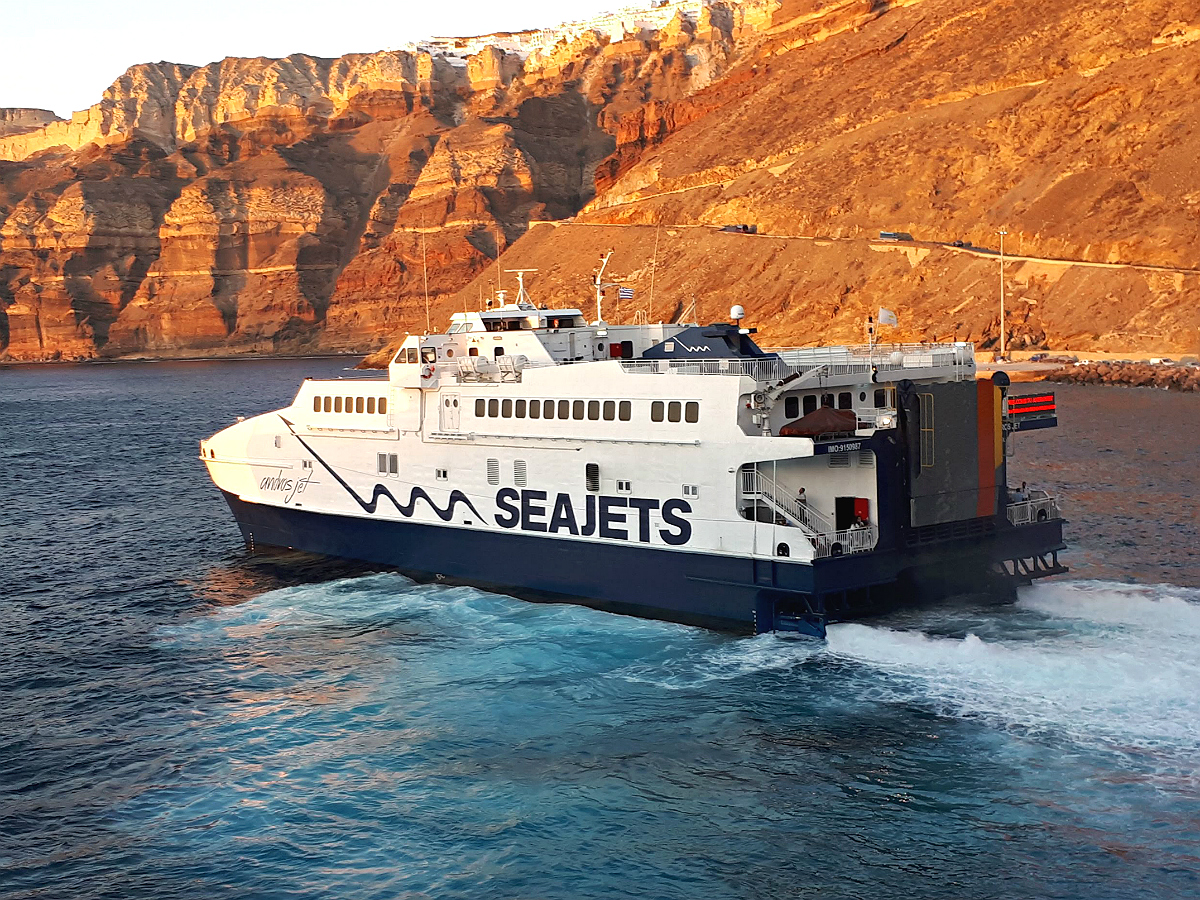
- Andros Jet in Santorini

History
- Name: (1997–2017): Cezayirli Hasan Paşa 1; (2017–present): Andros Jet
- Owner: (1997–2017): İDO; (2017–present): Seajets
- Operator: (1997–2017): İDO; (2017–present): Seajets
- Port of registry: (1997–2017): Istanbul, Turkey; (2017–present): Limassol, Cyprus
- Builder: Austal; Henderson, Western Australia
- Yard number: 55
- Laid down: 1 July 1996
- Launched: 10 June 1997
- Completed: 11 July 1997
- Maiden voyage: 1997
- In service: 1 August 1997
- Identification: IMO number: 9150987; Call sign: SVAJ2; MMSI number: 209252000
- Status: laid up

General characteristics
- Class & type: Auto Express 60-class catamaran
- Tonnage: 2,695 GT
- Length: 59.90 m (196 ft 6 in)
- Beam: 17.50 m (57 ft 5 in)
- Draft: 3.17 m (10 ft 5 in)
- Propulsion: 2 × MTU 20V1163TB73L diesel engines; Waterjets
- Speed: 34 knots
- Capacity: 600 passengers; 90 cars

Andros Jet is a catamaran belonging to the Greek shipping company Seajets. It was built by Austal in 1997, for Turkish shipping company IDO.

== Service ==
The catamaran, the second of a series of two sister units, was launched on 10 June 1997 at the Austalspecialist shipyard in Fremantle with the name of Cezayirli Hasan Pasa 1 and delivered on 11 July to the Turkish company İstanbul Deniz Otobüsleri, for which it entered service in August on the routes between Yalova and Pendik, where it was alongside its sister ship Turgut Reis 1. In September 2017, after approximately twenty years of service in the Bosphorus, the catamaran was sold for two million dollars to the Greek company Seajets, by which it was renamed Andros Jet and transferred on 11 September to the Perama shipyards, where it underwent a series of renovation works, later completed in Chalkida. In 2018 it finally started service on the inter-Cycladic connections between the islands of Lavrion, Kea, Kythnos, Andros, Tinos, Syros, Paros, Naxos, Donoussa, Amorgos, Koufonisia, Schoinoussa, Irakleia, Folegandros, Sikinos, Ios, Therasia, Santorini, Anafi, which it served with no small problems, due to repeated engine failures.

In 2019 the catamaran was transferred to the Rafina, Andros, Tinos, Mykonos, Paros and Naxos routes, returning to service the following year on the inter-Cycladic route. However, during this third season for Seajets, Andros Jet suffered another serious engine failure, which forced the company to lay her up in Chalkida, where she remains today.

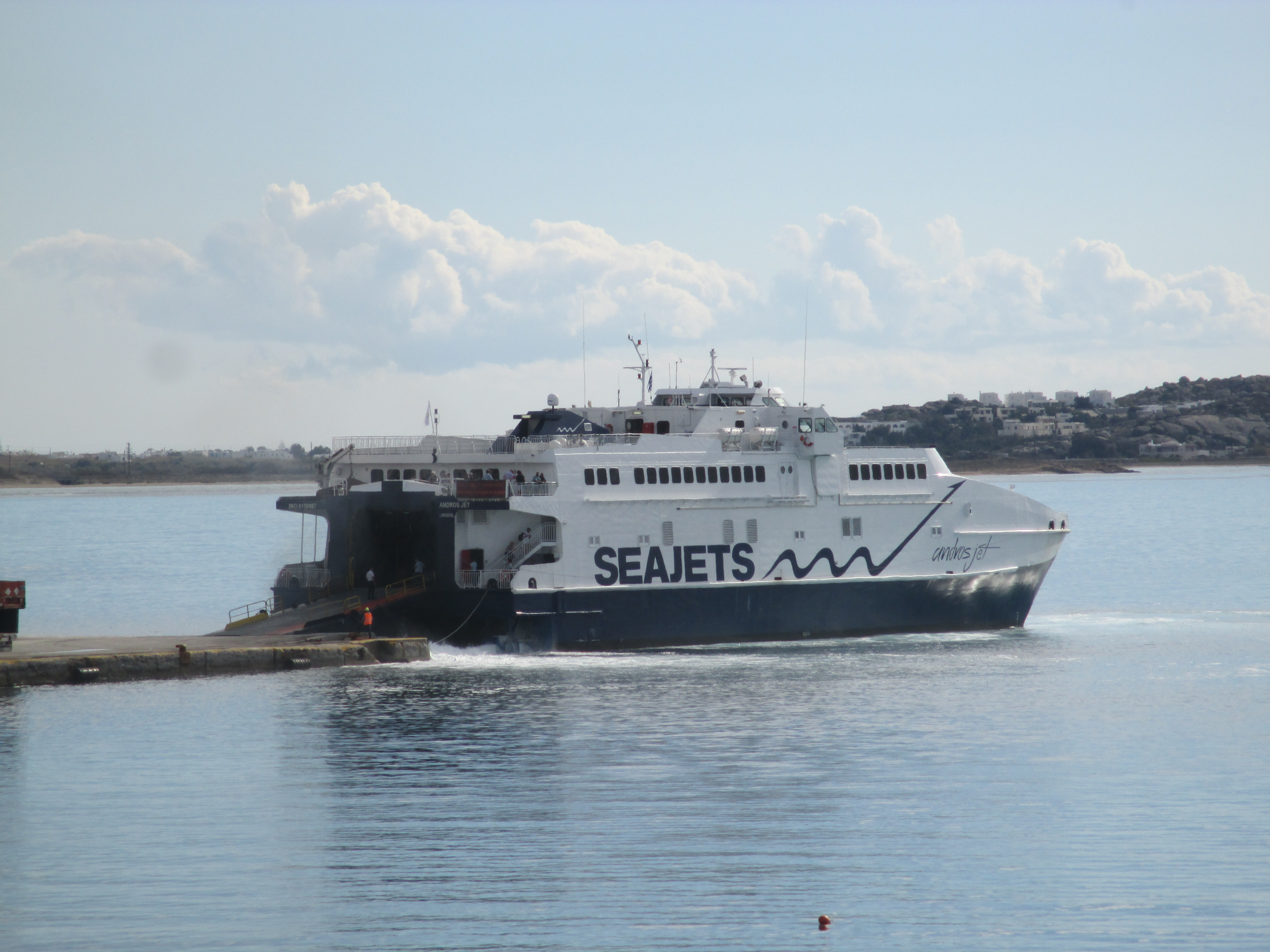
Andros Jet in Naxos

== Sister ships ==
- Castavi Jet
