= HSC Taurus =

Scrapped fast ferry

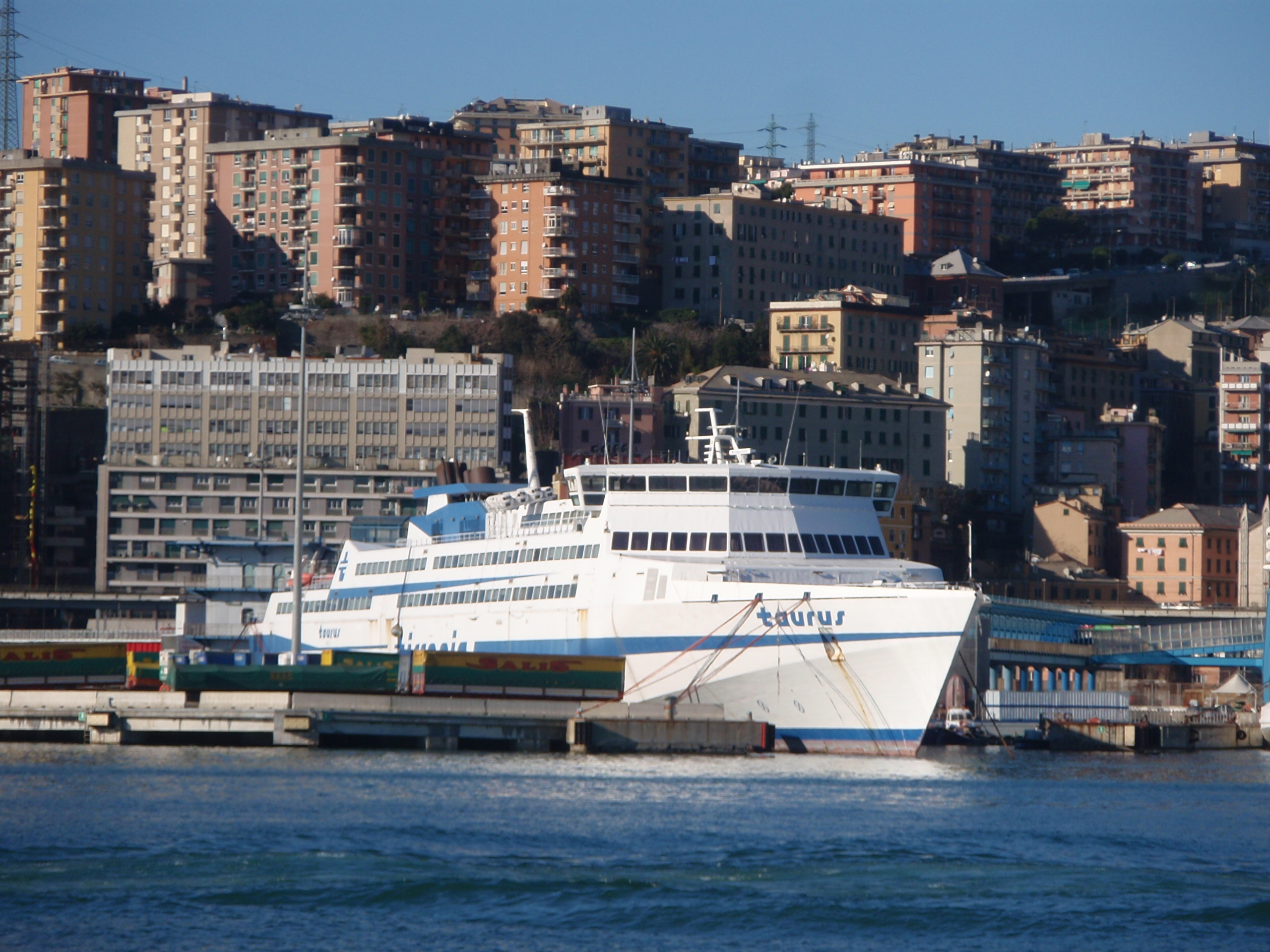
- Taurus in Genoa

History
- Name: Taurus (1998–2011)
- Owner: (1998–2011): Tirrenia di Navigazione; (2011): Karina Shipping Ltd.
- Operator: Tirrenia di Navigazione
- Port of registry: Naples, Italy (1998–2011); Sierra Leone (2011)
- Route: Civitavecchia – Olbia / Arbatax
- Ordered: 1996
- Builder: Fincantieri (Cantieri Navali Italiani S.p.A.); Genoa, Italy
- Yard number: 6009
- Launched: 1998
- Completed: June 1998
- Acquired: 1998
- Maiden voyage: 1998
- In service: 1998
- Out of service: 2003
- Identification: IMO number: 9144287; Call sign: IBLX
- Fate: Broken up at Aliağa, Turkey (2011)
- Status: Scrapped

General characteristics
- Class & type: Fincantieri MDV 3000 (Jupiter class)
- Tonnage: 11,347 GT; 1,200 DWT
- Length: 145.94 m (478 ft 10 in)
- Beam: 22.00 m (72 ft 2 in)
- Draft: 3.90 m (12 ft 10 in)
- Decks: 4
- Ramps: Stern loading ramps
- Installed power: 2 × General Electric/Fiat LM2500 gas turbines (total 42,000 kW); 4 × MTU 20V 1163 TB73L diesel engines (total 26,000 kW); Total output: 68,000 kW (91,200 hp)
- Propulsion: 4 × KaMeWa waterjets (2 steering, 2 booster)
- Speed: 40.0 knots (74.1 km/h; 46.0 mph) (service) 42.0 knots (77.8 km/h; 48.3 mph) (max)
- Capacity: 1,800 passengers; 460 cars (or 30 buses)
- Crew: 29

Taurus was a ferry, owned from 1998 to 2011 by the Italian shipping company Tirrenia di Navigazione, as well as the first single-hull in the world, together with its twins, capable of reaching 40 knots and exceeding 1,000 tons of deadweight.

== Design Details ==
The Taurus was a single-hull craft constructed almost entirely of aluminum alloy, except for parts subjected to high mechanical stress, which were made of special steels. To ensure the vessel's excellent seaworthiness, the hull profile was a deep V. Two pairs of active stabilizer fins, controlled by onboard software, kept the ship's roll and yaw under control.

The ship was organized into six decks: three (the main deck, the upper deck, and the observation deck) were used for passenger transport, while the other three (the lower garage, the main garage, and the upper garage) were used for vehicle transport. The upper garage deck was liftable.

1. The main deck housed the reception, bar and 1208 second class seats.
2. The upper deck housed 576 first class seats
3. The belvedere bridge housed a bar

Passengers boarded via a special ramp at the stern to reach the main garage. The garage was then connected to the passenger decks by stairs and two elevators, each capable of holding up to 12 people. There were 34 crew spaces.

The ship could carry 460 motor vehicles, and her three garage decks could be loaded simultaneously. When carrying trucks, however, the capacity was 30 vehicles plus 100 cars (mainly housed in the lower garage). The two stern ramps were designed to load and unload 45-ton trucks (15 tons per axle). Hydraulic lifting systems allowed for a garage roof height of 4.4 meters. The ships in this series did not have bow doors, and all loading and unloading operations were carried out through the two stern doors, requiring a U-turn when exiting. Furthermore, the ferry was designed to be completely evacuated in less than 15 minutes.

== Engine details ==
The ferry's propulsion system consisted of two General Electric/Fiat Avio LM2500 gas turbines(21,000 kW) and four MTU 20V1163TB 73-liter diesel engines (6,500 kW), for a total power output of 67,000 kW. The LM2500 series gas turbines are a derivative of the General Electric CF6-6 aircraft turbine and are frequently used in warships, hydrofoils, hovercraft, and other vessels. The LM2500 gas turbines drove the center waterjet boosters, two KaMeWa 180 SII units, while twin diesel engines drove the port and starboard waterjets, two KaMeWa 140 SII units. The pairs of boosters were fixed, while the side waterjets could pivot and act as rudders; the latter were, at the time of construction, the largest ever built in the world. The flexible configuration of the propulsion system allowed the ship to operate at three speeds. The system was capable of pushing the ship to over 40 knots, although it was typically used to provide 90% of the total power.

== Service ==
Inserted in the summer of 1998 on the Civitavecchia - Olbia route together with its twin Aries, it allowed the journey to be completed in just over three hours. In 2003, the shipping company decommissioned the vessel after only five years of operation. This type of ferry proved uneconomical due to its extremely high fuel consumption (approximately 290 kg of diesel per minute), its limited versatility, and, above all, growing competition in the maritime sector.

Selling them also proved difficult. Catamarans, which were more stable and had lower operating costs, were preferred to this type of ferry. One interested buyer was the U.S. Navy, but the parties could not agree on a price.

== Sister ships ==
- Aries
- Tera Jet
- Apri
