= Castavi Jet =

Austal catamaran

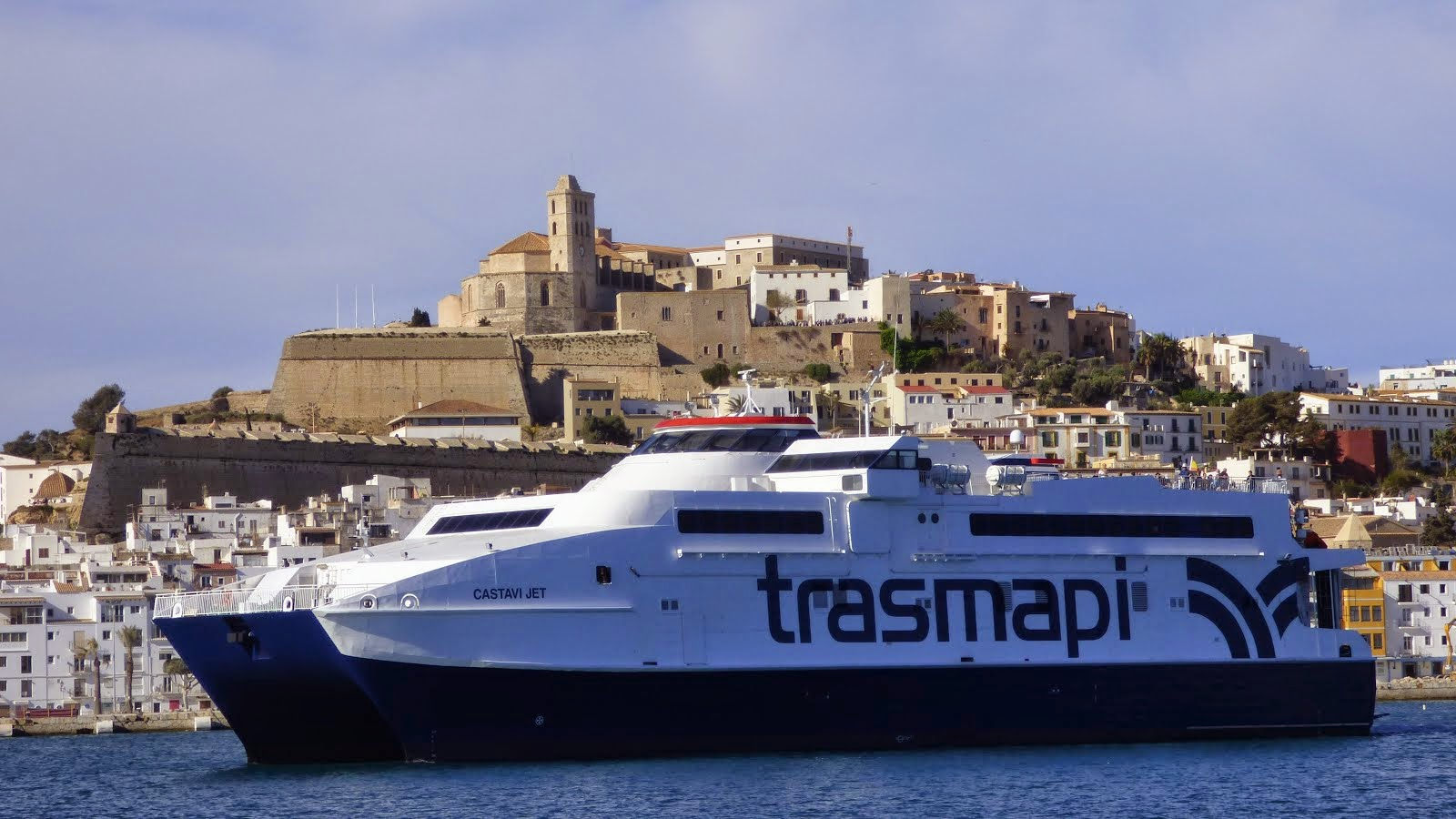
- Castavi Jet

History
- Name: (1997–2014): Turgut Reis I; (2014–present): Castavi Jet
- Owner: (1997–2013): İDO; (2013–present): Sercomisa SA
- Operator: (1997–2013): İDO; (2014–present): Trasmapi
- Port of registry: (1997–2013): Istanbul, Turkey; (2014–present): Santa Cruz de Tenerife, Spain
- Route: Ibiza – Formentera
- Builder: Austal Ships Pty Ltd; Fremantle, Western Australia
- Yard number: 54
- Laid down: 27 June 1996
- Launched: 19 April 1997
- Completed: 30 May 1997
- Acquired: July 2014
- In service: May 1997
- Identification: IMO number: 9150975; Call sign: EABP; MMSI number: 224008000
- Status: In service
- Notes: Sister ship to Andros Jet

General characteristics
- Class & type: Austal Auto Express 60
- Tonnage: 2,743 GT; 184 DWT
- Length: 59.90 m (196 ft 6 in)
- Beam: 17.50 m (57 ft 5 in)
- Draft: 2.70 m (8 ft 10 in)
- Depth: 6.65 m (21 ft 10 in)
- Ramps: Stern ramp (6.00 m x 5.40 m)
- Installed power: 4 × Mitsubishi S16R MPTAW2 diesel engines (total 5,520 kW) (2015–present); Former : 2 × MTU 20V 1163 TB73L diesel engines (total 13,000 kW) (1997–2015)
- Propulsion: 2 × KaMeWa 125 SII waterjets
- Speed: 22.0 knots (40.7 km/h; 25.3 mph) (service) 33.0 knots (61.1 km/h; 38.0 mph) (max)
- Capacity: 450 passengers; 94 cars
- Crew: 16

Castavi Jet is a 60-metre (200 ft) high-speed catamaran ferry operated by the Spanish shipping line Trasmapi. Built in Australia by Austal in 1997, the vessel spent the first seventeen years of her career operating in Turkey for Istanbul Deniz Otobüsleri (İDO) under the name Turgut Reis I. In 2014, she was acquired by Trasmapi, renamed, and has since been deployed on the busy inter-island route between Ibiza and Formentera in the Balearic Islands.

== Service ==
The catamaran, the second of a series of two twin units commissioned by İstanbul Deniz Otobüsleri to the specialist shipyard Austal in Fremantle, was launched on 19 April 1997 with the name of Turgut Reis 1 and delivered on 30 May to the Turkish company, for which it began service in July on the routes between Yalova and Pendik, where it was joined shortly after by its twin Cezayirli Hasan Pasa 1. In December 2013, after about sixteen years of service in the Bosphorus, the catamaran was sold to the Spanish company Trasmapi, which renamed it Castavi Jet and introduced it in the first months of 2014 on the routes between Ibiza and La Savina, the latter on the island of Formentera.
