= Kireas =

Kireas Κηρέας
- Municipal unit
- Location within Euboea regional unit

- Location within Greece
- Coordinates: 38°48′N 23°31′E
- Country: Greece
- Administrative region: Central Greece
- Regional unit: Euboea
- Municipality: Mantoudi-Limni-Agia Anna

Area
  - Municipal unit: 294.665 km^{2} (113.771 sq mi)

Population (2021)
  - Municipal unit: 5,845
  - Municipal unit density: 19.84/km^{2} (51.38/sq mi)
- Time zone: UTC+2 (EET)
  - Summer (DST): UTC+3 (EEST)
- Vehicle registration: ΧΑ

Kireas (Greek: Κηρέας) is a former municipality in Euboea, Greece. Since the 2011 local government reform it is part of the municipality Mantoudi-Limni-Agia Anna, of which it is a municipal unit. The municipal unit has an area of 294.665 km^{2}. Population 5,845 (2021). The seat of the municipality was in Mantoudi.

The name comes from Kireas River which flows from the mountains of Fteritsa, Pyxaria and Mavrovouni, joins with Neleus River finally flowing into the Aegean near the sea shore of Krya Vrysi in North Euboia. Strabo mentions a legend according to which sheep drinking from Kireas gave birth to white offspring while those drinking from Neleus gave birth to black. The sycamore forest in this Kireas' banks hosts the oldest and greatest in size tree in the Balkans, the "Μέγας Πλάτανος" (Great Sycamore).

== Twin towns ==
Kireas is twinned with:

- Ürgüp, Turkey (since 2004)
