= Tera Jet =

Greek fast ferry

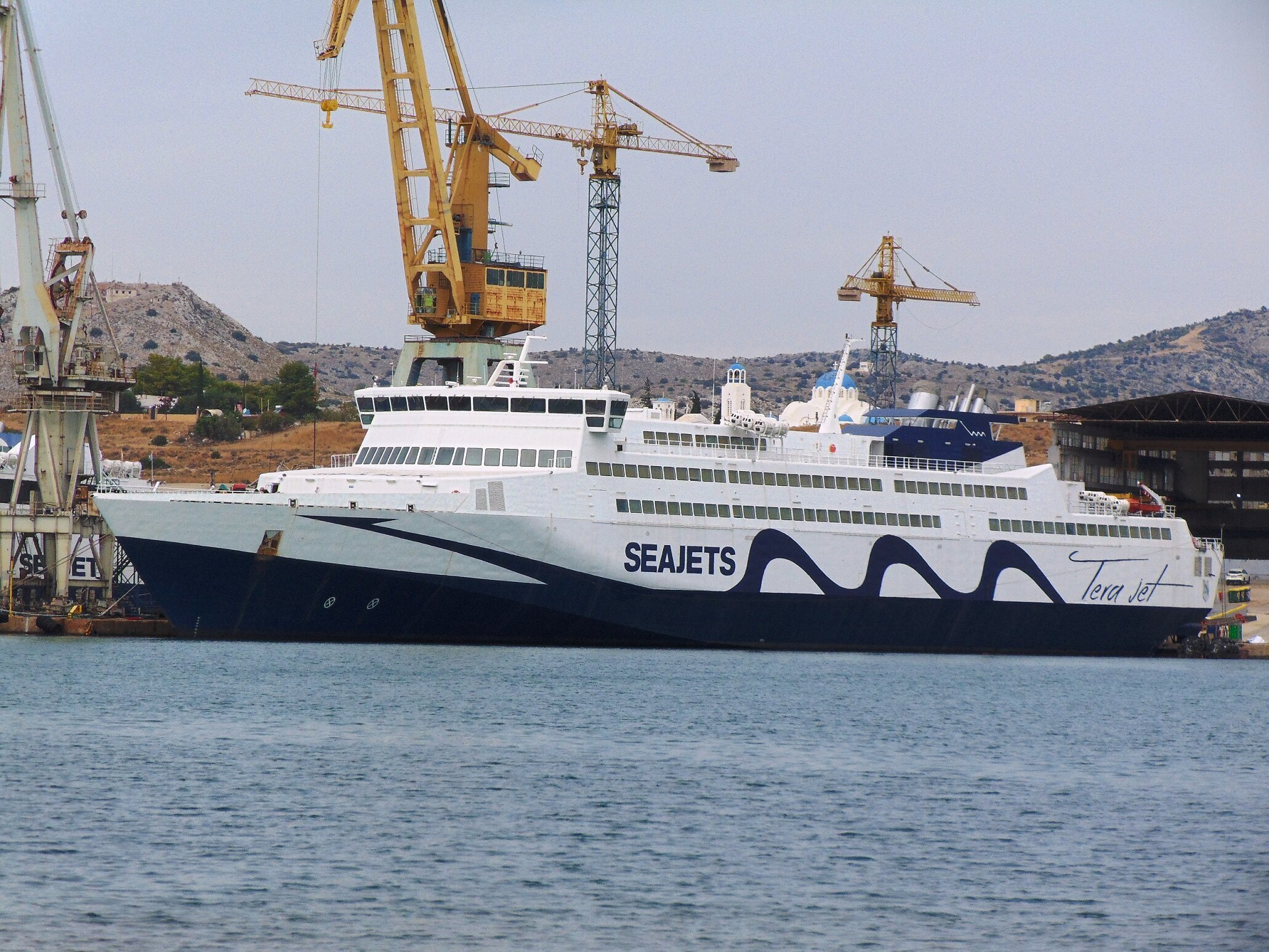
- Tera Jet laid up in Salamis

History
- Name: Scorpio (1999–2012); Sea Breeze III (2012–2014); Tera Jet (2014-present)
- Owner: Tirrenia di Navigazione (1999–2011); Karina Shipping Ltd (2011–2012); Sea Breeze Navigation Co. S.A. (2012–2014); Seajets (2014-present)
- Port of registry: Limassol, Cyprus
- Route: Piraeus–Cyclades (seasonal)
- Builder: Fincantieri, Italy
- Yard number: 6047
- Launched: 17 March 1999
- Completed: June 1999
- Maiden voyage: 1999
- In service: In service / Seasonal lay-up
- Identification: IMO number: 9179660; Call sign: 5BBY4; MMSI number: 212260000

General characteristics
- Type: HSC Ro-Pax Ferry
- Tonnage: 11,347 GT
- Length: 145.94 m (478.8 ft)
- Beam: 22 m (72 ft)
- Draft: 3.9 m (13 ft)
- Propulsion: 2 × GE/Fiat LM2500 gas turbines; 4 × MTU 20V1163 diesel engines; 4 × KaMeWa waterjets
- Speed: 40 knots (service); 42 knots (max)
- Capacity: 2,100 passengers; 600 cars

Tera Jet is a ferry belonging to the Greek shipping company Seajets. Tera Jet and its twins are the first single-hulls exceeding 1,000 tonnes of deadweight capable of reaching 40 knots.

== Characteristics ==
=== Design details ===
The ferry is a single-hull craft made almost entirely of aluminum alloy, with parts subjected to high mechanical stress made of special steels. To give the vessel excellent seaworthiness, the hull profile is of the deep V type. Two pairs of active stabilizing fins, controlled by on-board software, keep the vessel's roll and yaw under control.

The ship is organized across six decks. Three (the main deck, the upper deck, and the observation deck) are used for passenger transport, while the other three (the lower garage, the main garage, and the upper garage) are used for vehicle transport. The upper garage deck can be raised.

- The Main Deck houses: Reception, Bar and 1208 second class seats
- The Upper Deck houses: 576 First Class seats
- The Belvedere Bridge (so called during the Italian service) hosts a bar

Passengers board via a dedicated ramp at the stern to reach the main garage. The garage is then connected to the passenger decks by stairs and two elevators, each with a capacity of 12 passengers. There are 34 crew spaces. The vessel can carry 460 vehicles, and its three garage decks can be loaded simultaneously. When transporting trucks, the capacity is 30 vehicles plus 100 cars (mainly housed in the lower garage). The two stern ramps are designed to load and unload 45-ton trucks (15 per axle). Hydraulic lifting systems allow the garage roof to be 4.4 meters high. Scorpio has no bow doors, and all loading and unloading operations are carried out through the two stern doors, requiring a U-turn when exiting. Furthermore, the ferry is designed to be completely evacuated in less than 15 minutes.

=== Engine details ===
The vessel's propulsion system consists of two General Electric/Fiat Avio LM2500 gas turbines (21 MW) and four MTU 20V1163TB 73-liter diesel engines (6.5 MW) for a total of 67 MW. The LM2500 series gas turbines are a derivative of the General Electric CF6-6 aircraft turbine and are frequently used in warships, hydrofoils, hovercraft, and other vessels of this class. The LM2500 gas turbines drive the center waterjet boosters, two KaMeWa 180 SII, while twin diesel engines drive the port and starboard waterjets, two KaMeWa 140 SII. The booster pairs are fixed, while the side waterjets can pivot to act as rudders. The steerable waterjet pairs were, at the time of construction, the largest ever built in the world. The flexible propulsion system configuration allows the vessel to operate at three speeds. The system is capable of propelling the vessel to over 40 knots, although it is typically used to provide 90% of the total power.

== Service ==
The ferry, the last of a series of four sister ships, was launched on 17 March 1999 at the Fincantieri shipyard in Riva Trigoso under the name Scorpio and delivered on 4 June to the Italian state-owned shipping company Tirrenia di Navigazione, for which it entered service on the Genoa - Porto Torres route, together with its sister ship Capricorn, which entered service on the same days. The two ferries, thanks to their very high speed, allowed them to cover the route in just over five hours compared to the twelve hours of conventional ferries. However, just six years later, in 2005, with the entry into service of the brand new Sharden, Scorpio was chartered to Siremar, a Sicilian subsidiary of Tirrenia, which placed it on the routes between Milazzo, the Aeolian Islands and Naples, where it operated until the end of the 2006 summer season, when it was replaced by the Capricorn, returning to the main fleet as a reserve unit. In the 2007 summer season, following the Capricorn's decommissioning at the end of its Sicilian experience, the ferry, now the last of its class still in operation, operated on the connections between Fiumicino, Golfo Aranci and Arbatax.

On 3 April 2008, with the certainty that the unit would not return to service under the Tirrenia flag, Scorpio was chartered to Corsica Ferries - Sardinia Ferries, from which it was introduced on 13 June on the connections between Livorno and Golfo Aranci, where it operated until 6 September as Mega Express Five, which had suffered delays in delivery by the shipyard after extensive restructuring works. At the end of the charter, the ferry was laid up in Olbia, then transferred to Arbatax and finally to Cagliari in the autumn of 2010, still waiting for buyers. In September 2011, after three years of lay up, the ferry was sold together with the twins Capricorn, Aries and Taurus for demolition to the Tuvalian company Karina Shipping, changing its name to Scorpio I. However, the ferry, along with the Capricorn, never set sail for Turkey unlike the other two sister ships, but instead remained laid up in Sardinia until 4 May 2012, when, after being sold in April to the Dominican company Millenia Shipping, it was transferred to the Elefsina shipyards under tow under the name Ronke, thus renamed the day before its departure from Italy. A few days later, on 3 July, it was transferred to Drapetsona. After approximately two further years of lay-up in Greece, where it was renamed, first Amor and then Sea Breeze III, the ferry was purchased in March 2014 by Seajets, which subjected it to major renovation works in the Perama shipyards, after which it entered service on 25 July following on the connections between Heraklion and Santorini with the name of Tera Jet, achieving great success, despite the aggressive competition of Hellenic Seaways, active on the route with the '5. The following year, the route of the new flagship of the company, a title taken from Mega Jet, was joined by Io, Naxos and Mykonos. At the end of the 2015 summer season, it was used to transfer Syrian refugees from the north-eastern Aegean Islands to Piraeus.

In the 2017 summer season, it was transferred to the Rafina, Tinos, Mykonos, Paros and Naxos routes, where it operated alongside the Paros Jet, an old competitor in the fast connections to and from Sardinia. On this route too, the Paros Jet was very successful, prompting the company to add an intermediate stop in Andros the following year. In 2019, it returned to service on the Piraeus, Paros, Ios and Santorini routes, which was the last season it operated regularly. In fact, the following year the ferry did not operate, remaining laid up in Attica until the summer of 2022, when it returned to service on the Piraeus, Serifos, Sifnos and Milos routes, at the end of which it was laid up again in Elefsina due to increasing operating costs.

== Sister ships ==
- Aries
- Taurus
- Apri
