= Champions League Jet 2 =

High-speed catamaran

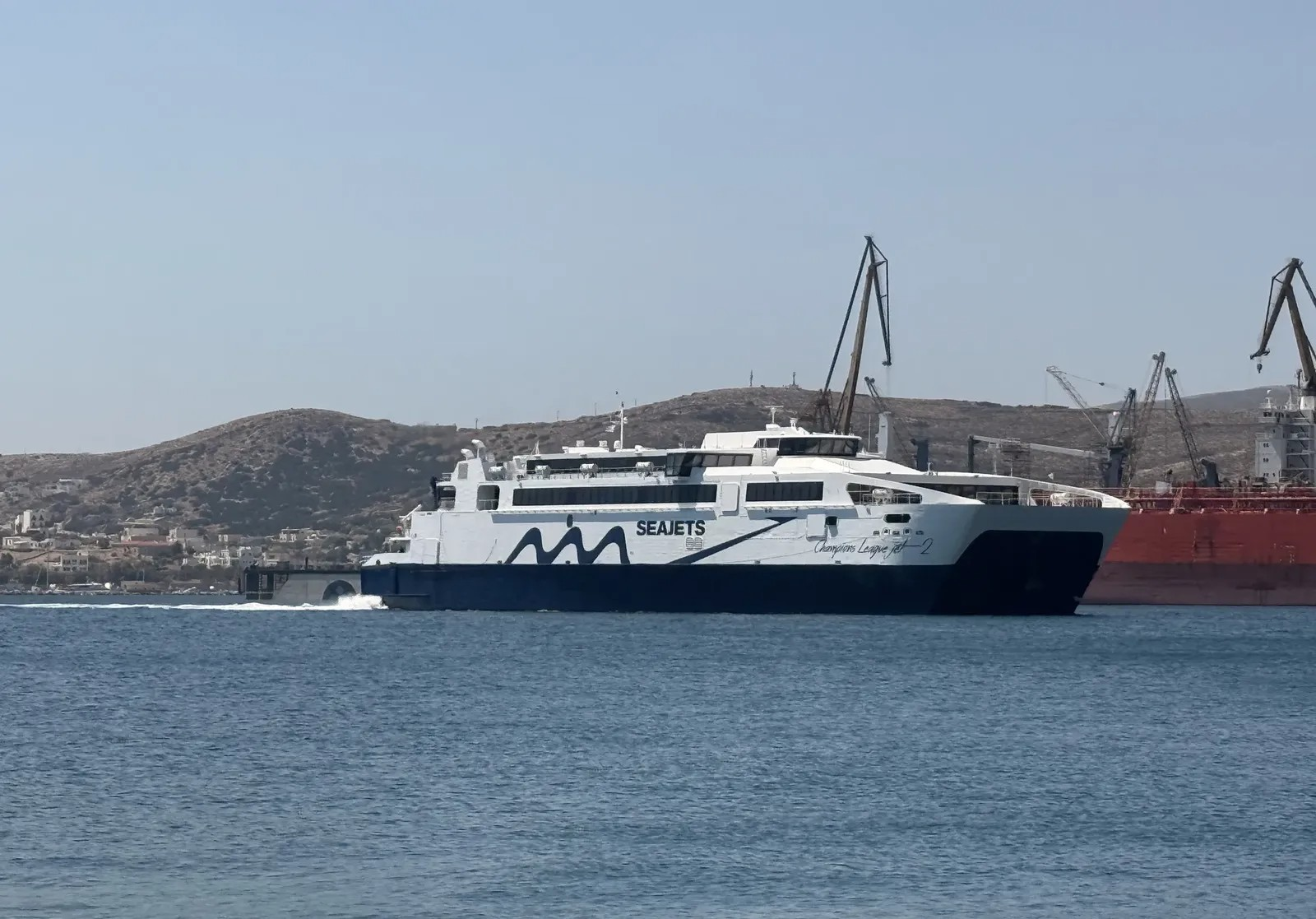
- Champions League Jet 2 in Syros

History
- Name: (2007–2024): Orhan Gazi-1; (2024): Jumbo Jet 2; (2024–present): Champions League Jet 2
- Owner: (2007–2024): İstanbul Deniz Otobüsleri; (2024–present): Seajets
- Operator: (2007–2024): İstanbul Deniz Otobüsleri; (2024–present): Seajets
- Port of registry: (2007–2024): Istanbul, Turkey; (2024): Bissau, Guinea-Bissau; (2024–present): Limassol, Cyprus
- Route: Cyclades (Seasonal)
- Builder: Austal; Fremantle, Australia
- Yard number: 295
- Launched: 2007
- Completed: July 2007
- Acquired: 30 January 2024
- Maiden voyage: 2007
- In service: 2007
- Identification: IMO number: 9378072; Call sign: 5BNE6; MMSI number: 210965000
- Status: In service

General characteristics
- Class & type: Austal Auto Express 88 catamaran
- Tonnage: 6,133 GT; 520 DWT
- Length: 87.85 m (288 ft 3 in)
- Beam: 24.0 m (78 ft 9 in)
- Draft: 3.63 m (11 ft 11 in)
- Installed power: 4 × MTU 20V8000 M71R diesel engines (28,800 kW total)
- Propulsion: 4 × waterjets
- Speed: 37.4 knots (69.3 km/h; 43.0 mph) (service) 40.0 knots (74.1 km/h; 46.0 mph) (max)
- Capacity: 1,200 passengers; 225 cars

Champions League Jet 2 is a high-speed catamaran car-ferry operated by the Greek shipping company Seajets. Built in 2007 by Austal in Australia, the vessel was originally named Orhan Gazi-1 and operated in Turkey for İstanbul Deniz Otobüsleri (İDO). Following its acquisition by Seajets in 2024, it underwent a refit in Greece in order to be deployed on seasonal passenger routes in the Aegean Sea.

== Service ==
The catamaran, the second of a series of two sister units, was built at the Austal specialist shipyard in Fremantle as Orhan Gazi-1 and delivered in July 2007 to the Turkish company İstanbul Deniz Otobüsleri, which put it on the routes between Istanbul and Mudanya, where it served alongside its sister ship Osman Gazi-1. Over the years, the two catamarans continued to serve the route regularly, until 2023, when they were both laid up, in the case of Orhan Gazi-1 in Alexandretta, and put up for sale pending buyers. On 30 January 2024, after about a year out of service, both fast ferries were finally purchased by the Greek company Seajets and transferred to the Spanopoulos shipyards in Ampelakia, in the case of Orhan Gazi-1 setting sail on 5 April from Istanbul under tow by the tug Tedy with the provisional name of Jumbo Jet 2, arriving two days later in Greece to undergo preparatory works to adapt to the new service in the Aegean. In June, during the dry dock works, the catamaran was then renamed Champions League Jet 2. In the first months of 2026 it was transferred to the shipyards of Eleusis, to be prepared for entering service on the connections to the Cyclades in the summer season, which subsequently took place on 25 July on those between Piraeus, Syros, Tinos, Mykonos, Paros, Naxos, Santorini and Herakleion.
