= HSC Express Jet =

High-speed passenger ferry

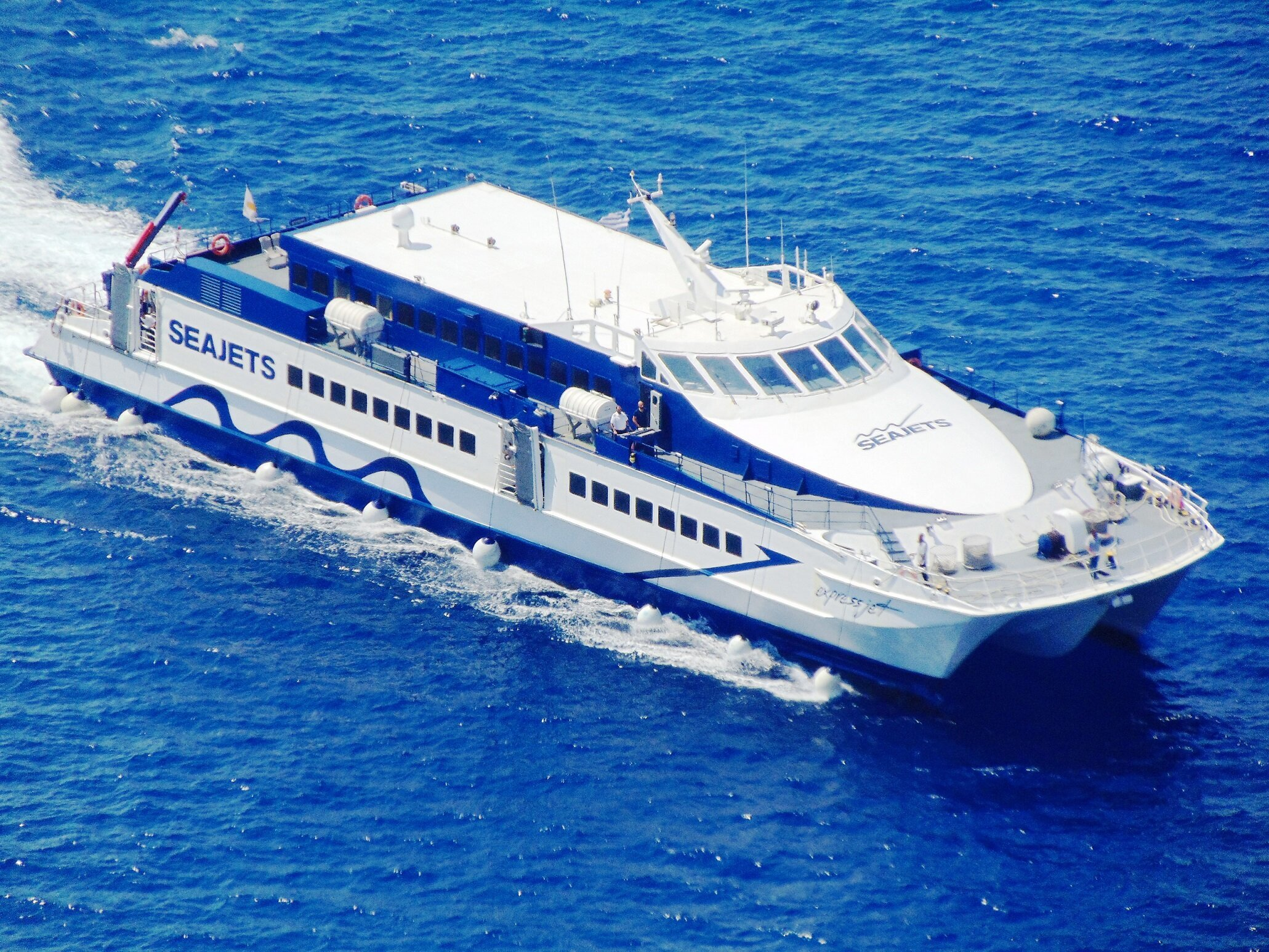
- Express Jet in Santorini

History
- Name: 1999–2016: Betico; 2016–2023: Sifnos Jet; 2023–present: Express Jet
- Owner: 1999–2016: Compagnie Maritime Des Îles; 2016–present: Seajets
- Operator: 1999–2009: Compagnie Maritime Des Îles; 2016–present: Seajets
- Port of registry: 1999–2016: Mata Utu, Wallis and Futuna; 2016–present: Limassol, Cyprus
- Route: Piraeus / Heraklion – Cyclades / Sporades; Former: Nouméa – Loyalty Islands
- Ordered: 1998
- Builder: Austal; Fremantle, Western Australia
- Yard number: 079
- Laid down: 1998
- Launched: 1999
- Completed: 9 August 1999
- Acquired: October 2016 (by Seajets)
- Maiden voyage: August 1999
- In service: 1999
- Identification: IMO number: 9204324; Call sign: 5BLV4; MMSI number: 210205000
- Status: in service

General characteristics
- Class & type: Austal 52m High-Speed Passenger Catamaran
- Tonnage: 906 GT; 120 DWT
- Length: 52.40 m (171 ft 11 in) (overall)
- Beam: 13.00 m (42 ft 8 in)
- Draught: 3.00 m (9 ft 10 in)
- Decks: 2
- Ramps: Side passenger loading doors
- Installed power: 4 × MTU main diesel engines
- Propulsion: 4 × KaMeWa waterjets
- Speed: 34.0 knots (63.0 km/h; 39.1 mph) (service) / 38.0 knots (70.4 km/h; 43.7 mph) (max)
- Capacity: 500 passengers; Passenger-only (0 vehicle capacity)
- Crew: 15–20

Express Jet is a catamaran belonging to the Greek shipping company Seajets. Originally built as Betico for Compagnie Maritime Des Îles, it was laid up until 2016 when it was brought in Greece for Seajets.

== Service ==
The catamaran, built at the Austal specialist shipyard in Fremantle under the name Betico, was delivered on 9 July 1999 to the New Caledonian company Compagnie Maritime Des Îles, which put it on the routes between Nouméa, Île des Pins, Maré, Lifou and Ouvéa. Over the years, Betico continued to operate regularly on the route, until 2009, when, replaced by the new Betico 2, it was laid up in Nouméa and put up for sale pending buyers. On 3 October 2016, after seven years of lay-up, the catamaran was purchased by the Greek company Seajets, by which it was renamed Sifnos Jet and transferred to Eleusis, where it underwent the necessary restructuring work after the long period of inactivity, which was then completed in the shipyards of Chalkida and Perama. In 2019, after completion of the works, it then began service on the connections between Piraeus, Serifos, Sifnos, Milos, Kimolos, Folegandros, Therasia, Santorini and Ios .

In 2021, the catamaran was used on the routes between Heraklion, Rethymno, Santorini and Naxos, being then moved the following year to the routes between Paros and Mykonos, to which calls at Rafina, Tinos and Naxos were added the following year .

In April 2023, it was then renamed Express Jet and reintroduced on the routes between Santorini, Ios, Paros and Naxos, to then return in 2024 to those between Santorini, Rethymno and Heraklion, limited to the ports of Santorini and Heraklion in 2025.

In 2026, it was finally transferred to the routes between Piraeus, Serifos, Sifnos, Milos, Folegandros, Santorini, Naxos, Paros and Mykonos. Since June 8, 2026, Express Jet was put in the Heraklio - Thira and back route, sailing two times per week.
