= HSC Apri =

Italian monohull HSC

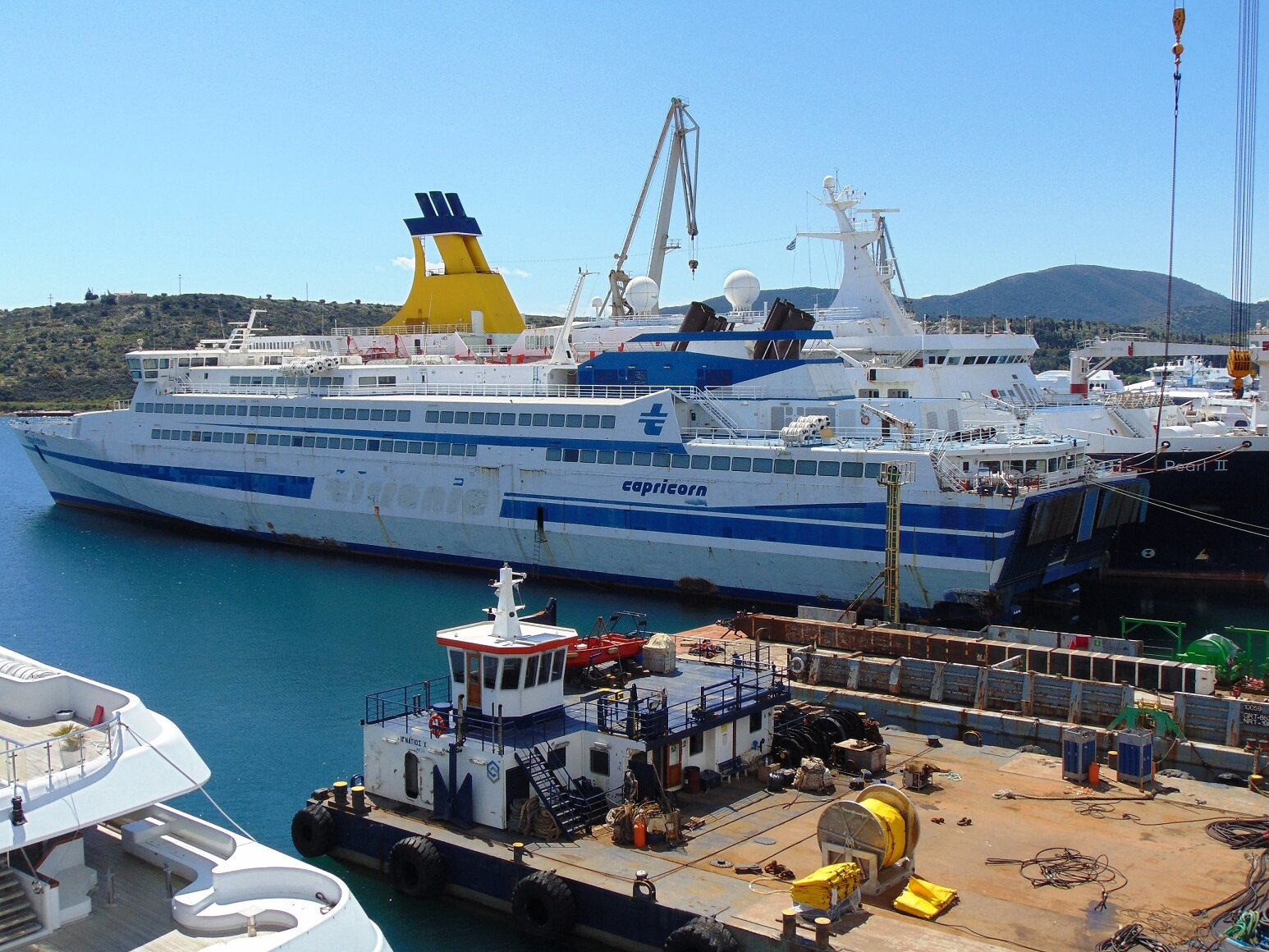
- Apri in Salamis

History
- Name: (1999–2019): Capricorn; (2019–present): Apri
- Owner: (1999–2011): Tirrenia di Navigazione; (2011): Karina Shipping Ltd; (2011–2019): Avid Ltd; (2019–present): Seajets (Quadrantilo Co.)
- Operator: (1999–2007): Tirrenia di Navigazione; (2019–present): Seajets
- Port of registry: (1999–2011): Naples, Italy; (2011–2013): Freetown, Sierra Leone; (2013–2019): George Town, Cayman Islands; (2019–present): Moroni, Comoros
- Route: Former: Genoa – Porto Torres / Olbia; Currently none (laid up)
- Builder: Fincantieri; Riva Trigoso, Italy
- Yard number: 6046
- Launched: 12 December 1998
- Completed: June 1999
- Acquired: June 2019
- Maiden voyage: 15 June 1999
- In service: 1999
- Out of service: 2007
- Identification: IMO number: 9179658; Call sign: D6A2885; MMSI number: 616000000
- Status: Laid up at Chalkis shipyards

General characteristics
- Class & type: Jupiter MDV 3000 (Monohull)
- Tonnage: 11,347 GT; 1,200 DWT
- Length: 145.6 m (477 ft 8 in)
- Beam: 22.0 m (72 ft 2 in)
- Draft: 3.99 m (13 ft 1 in)
- Decks: 4
- Ramps: Rear Ro-Ro ramps
- Installed power: 4 × MTU 20V 1163 diesel engines; 2 × General Electric/Fiat LM2500 gas turbines (total 68,000 kW)
- Propulsion: 4 × KaMeWa waterjets (2 fixed, 2 steering)
- Speed: 40.0 knots (74.1 km/h; 46.0 mph) (service) 42.0 knots (77.8 km/h; 48.3 mph) (max)
- Capacity: 1,800 passengers; 460 cars
- Crew: 34

Apri, originally Capricorn, is a 146-metre high-speed monohull passenger and vehicle ferry built by Fincantieri in 1999. Part of the pioneering Jupiter MDV 3000 class, she was originally operated by Italian shipping company Tirrenia on high-speed routes across the Tyrrhenian Sea. Following her withdrawal from active service in 2007 due to skyrocketing fuel costs, the vessel faced a turbulent decade—including an aborted attempt to convert her into a luxury mega-yacht in Croatia. She was purchased by the Greek fast-ferry operator Seajets in 2019, at which point her name was officially shortened to Apri.

== Design Data ==
Apri is a monohull made almost entirely of aluminum alloy, with the exception of parts subjected to high mechanical stress, which are made of special steels. To give the vessel excellent seaworthiness, the hull has a deep-V profile. Two pairs of active stabilizing fins, controlled by onboard software, keep the vessel's roll and yaw under control.

The ship isorganized into six decks: three (main, upper, and belvedere) are used for passenger transport, while the other three (lower garage, main garage, and upper garage) are used for vehicle transport. The upper garage deck is liftable.

1. The Main Deck houses: reception, bar and 1208 second class seats.
2. The Upper Deck houses: 576 first class seats
3. The Belvedere Bridge hosts a bar

Passengers board via a dedicated ramp at the stern to reach the main garage, which is connected to the passenger decks by stairs and two elevators, each with a capacity of 12 passengers. There are 34 crew spaces.

The vessel can carry 460 vehicles, and its three garage decks can be loaded simultaneously. When transporting trucks, however, the capacity is 30 vehicles plus 100 cars (mainly housed in the lower garage). The two stern ramps are designed to load and unload 45-ton trucks (15 per axle). Hydraulic lifting systems allow for a garage roof height of 4.4 meters. Vessels in this series do not have any access to the bow, so all loading and unloading operations are carried out through the two stern doors, requiring a U-turn when exiting. Furthermore, the ferry is designed to be completely evacuated in less than 15 minutes.

== Engine details ==
The ferry's propulsion system consists of two General Electric / Fiat Avio LM2500 gas turbines (21,000 kW) and four MTU 20V1163TB 73-liter diesel engines (6,500 kW), for a total power of 67,000 kW. The LM2500 series gas turbines are a derivative of the General Electric CF6-6 aircraft turbine and are frequently used in warships, hydrofoils, hovercraft, and other vessels of this class. The LM2500 gas turbines drive the center waterjet boosters, two KaMeWa 180 SII, while twin diesel engines drive the port and starboard waterjets, two KaMeWa 140 SII. The booster pairs are fixed, while the side waterjets can rotate to act as rudders. The steerable waterjet pairs were, at the time of construction, the largest ever built in the world. The flexible propulsion system configuration allows the vessel to operate at three speeds. The system is capable of propelling the vessel to over 40 knots, although it is typically used to provide 90% of the total power.

== Service ==
Launched in the summer of 1999 on the Genoa - Porto Torres route (along with her sister ship, Scorpio), the ferry could cover the route in just over five hours, compared to the 12 hours required by traditional ferries. The Capricorn served several routes, including the Fiumicino - Golfo Aranci route (which was discontinued at the end of 2008 ). In 2006, the ferry was chartered to its subsidiary Siremar to serve the Naples - Aeolian Islands route. The vessel was also used as a reserve, replacing the company's other ferries in the event of breakdowns.

This type of ferry, which proved to be uneconomical due to its very high fuel consumption, its lack of versatility and above all the growing competition in the maritime sector, was sold for demolition at an estimated price lower than its actual value (despite the poor conditions in which it was found).

The Capricorn was towed to Aliağa on 21 July 2011, at the end of October of the same year it was recovered by the Turkish shipyards to be converted into a luxury yacht and was moored for a period in Turkey (at the Tuzla shipyards) in an Italian basin (called Superbacino for its notable capacity) purchased for the price of one dollar by the port authority of Genoa.

After being transferred to the shipyard in Lamiane, a bay near Calle, on the island of Ugliano (in front of Zadar), where it remained stationary for three years, the Capricorn finally arrived on 24 September 2014 for dry dock work at the Viktor Lenac shipyard in Costrena, not far from Rijeka. As of 2018 it was reported to have been transferred to the Nauta Lamjana shipyards in Ugliano, near Zadar.

On 19 June 2019, following its acquisition by Seajets, already the owner of the sister vessel Tera Jet, the ferry arrived, under tow and with its lights off, towed by the tug Diavlos Force, at the Ampelakia shipyards on the island of Salamina, where it was supposedly to be refurbished. on the island of Salamina. On 14 May 2021, after two further years of lay-up in Greece, where no work was carried out on board, the ferry was then transferred under tow to the Avlis shipyards in Chalkida with its name truncated to Apri.

== Sister ships ==
- Aries
- Taurus
- Tera Jet
