= Champions League Jet 1 =

High speed craft

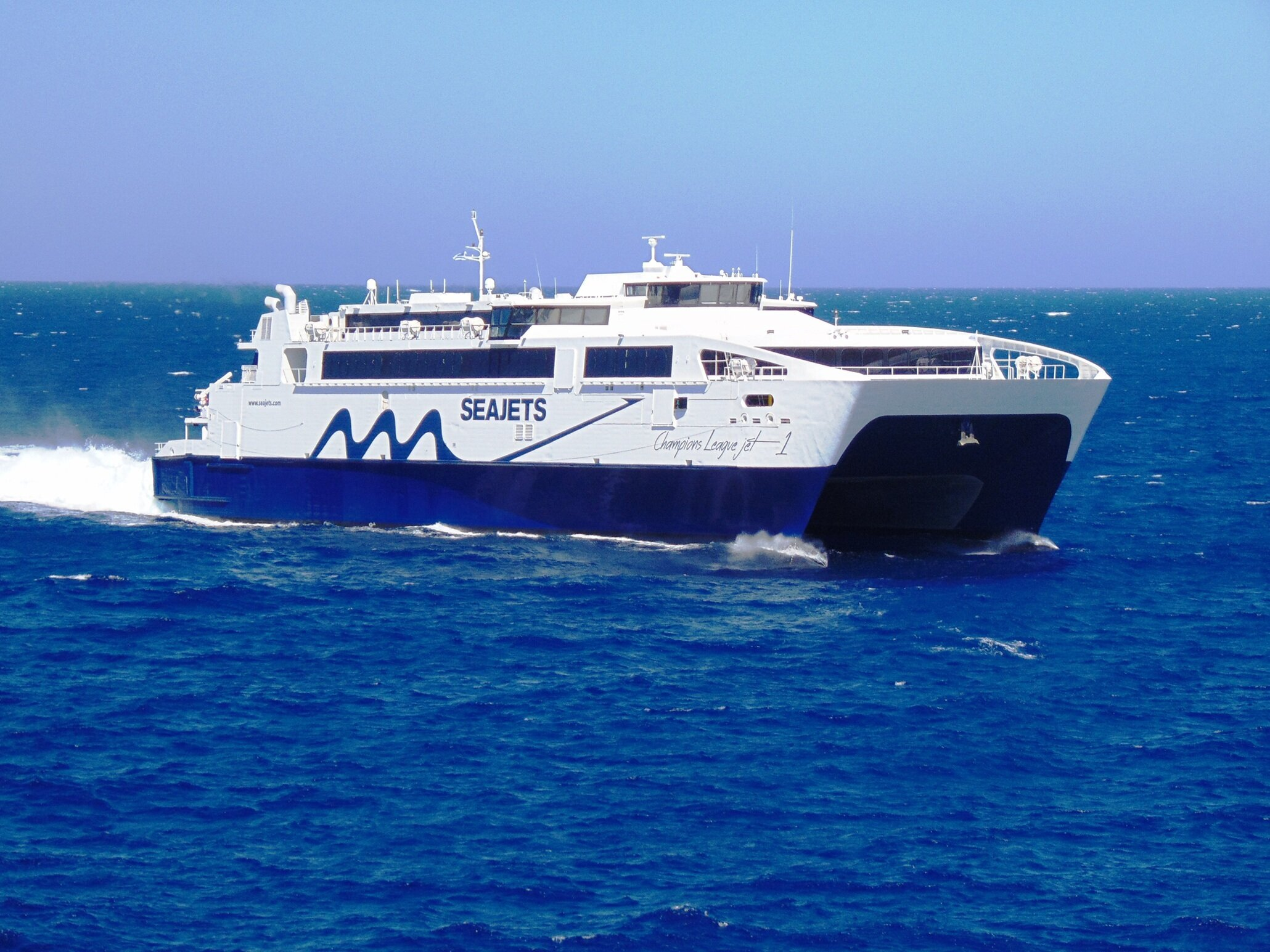
- Champions League Jet 1 in Mykonos

History
- Name: 2007–2024: Osman Gazi-1; 2024: Jambo Jet 2; 2024–2025: Jumbo Jet; 2025–present: Champions League Jet 1
- Owner: 2007–2024: İstanbul Deniz Otobüsleri; 2024–present: Seajets
- Operator: 2007–2023: İstanbul Deniz Otobüsleri; 2024–present: Seajets
- Port of registry: 2007–2024: Istanbul, Turkey; 2024: Bissau, Guinea-Bissau; 2024–present: Limassol, Cyprus
- Route: Piraeus – Syros – Mykonos – Paros – Naxos – Santorini – Heraklion; Former: Istanbul – Mudanya
- Ordered: 2005
- Builder: Austal; Fremantle, Australia
- Yard number: 294
- Laid down: 28 October 2005
- Launched: 12 December 2006
- Completed: 28 March 2007
- Acquired: 30 January 2024
- Maiden voyage: April 2007
- In service: 2007
- Identification: IMO number: 9372171; Call sign: 5BND6; MMSI number: 210967000
- Status: in service

General characteristics
- Class & type: Austal Auto Express 88
- Tonnage: 6,133 GT; 520 DWT
- Length: 88.0 m (288 ft 9 in)
- Beam: 24.0 m (78 ft 9 in)
- Draft: 3.90 m (12 ft 10 in)
- Decks: 4
- Ramps: Stern vehicle loading ramp
- Installed power: 4 × MTU 20V 8000 M71 main diesel engines
- Propulsion: 4 × waterjets
- Speed: 37.0 knots (68.5 km/h; 42.6 mph) (service) / 45.0 knots (83.3 km/h; 51.8 mph) (max)
- Capacity: 1,172 passengers; 140 cars
- Crew: 25–35
- Notes: Sister ship to Champions League Jet 2

Champions League Jet 1 is a catamaran belonging to the Greek shipping company Seajets. Built in 2007, she originally operated in Turkey with IDO under the name Osman Gazi-1. She currently operates in the Cyclades.

== Service ==
The catamaran, the first of a series of two sister units, was built at the Austal specialist shipyard in Fremantle as Osman Gazi-1 and delivered on 28 March 2007 to the Turkish company İstanbul Deniz Otobüsleri, which put it on the routes between Istanbul and Mudanya, where it was joined shortly after by its sister ship Orhan Gazi-1.Over the years, the two catamarans continued to serve the route regularly, until 2023, when they were both laid up, in the case of Osman Gazi-1 in Çeşme, and put up for sale pending buyers. On 30 January 2024, after approximately a year out of service, both fast ferries were finally purchased by the Greek company Seajetsand transferred to the Spanopoulos shipyards in Ampelakia, in the case of the Osman Gazi-1 setting sail on 5 April from Istanbulunder tow by the tug Haktan 1 with the provisional name of Jumbo Jet, arriving three days later in Greece to undergo preparatory works to adapt to the new service in the Aegean. In June, during the dry dock works, the catamaran was then renamed Jumbo Jet and on 2 August it was put on the routes between Piraeus, Syros, Tinos, Mykonos, Paros, Naxos, Santorini and Heraklion, where it also operated in the following two years, this time with the new name of Champions League Jet 1.

== Accidents and incidents ==
=== Collision in Marmara Sea (2011) ===
On 26 December 2011, the 193-meter ro-ro ferry Und Ege collided with the 88-meter high-speed catamaran ferry Osman Gazi 1 in the Sea of Marmara near the island of Sivriada, Turkey. The Und Ege scraped past the starboard bow and port superstructure of the Osman Gazi 1, causing minor structural damage to both vessels. While the impact caused brief panic among those on board, no injuries were reported among the 830 passengers and crew, or the drivers of the 150 vehicles aboard the Osman Gazi 1. The Und Ege similarly reported no casualties. The Turkish Accident Investigation Board subsequently launched an investigation into the circumstances surrounding the collision.

==== Allision (2015) ====
On October 24, 2015, the 88 meter long, 520 dwt high speed ro-ro passenger ferry Osman Gazi 1 allided with a pier near Mudanya, Turkey. The Osman Gazi 1 was approaching Mudanya from Istanbul with 786 passengers and 178 vehicles when it suffered engine failure near the piers. The ferry struck near its starboard aft section resulting in hull damage. No reports of injuries. All passengers and vehicles were unloaded. Reports state the vessel was able to proceed under its own power to Istanbul for repairs.

===== Ramp water incident (2024) =====
On 12 September 2024, while operating under its previous name Jumbo Jet, the vessel was involved in an incident during passenger disembarkation at the port of Mykonos. The ship surged forward unexpectedly, causing the front section of its ramp to tilt toward the water, which endangered passengers and resulted in three pieces of luggage and a stroller falling into the sea. According to the captain, the incident was caused by an operational error. The ship had arrived from Piraeus, Syros, and Tinos with 946 passengers.

Following the presentation of a certificate maintaining its class by the monitoring classification society, the Mykonos Port Authority cleared the vessel to depart with 705 passengers for Paros, Naxos, and its final destination of Piraeus, where it arrived safely. The captain was later arrested by port officials in Piraeus for dangerous interference with maritime transit under Article 291, Paragraph 3 of the Greek Penal Code, and was subsequently released on oral order from the Syros Public Prosecutor.
