= Mantoudi =

Mantoudi Μαντούδι
- Community
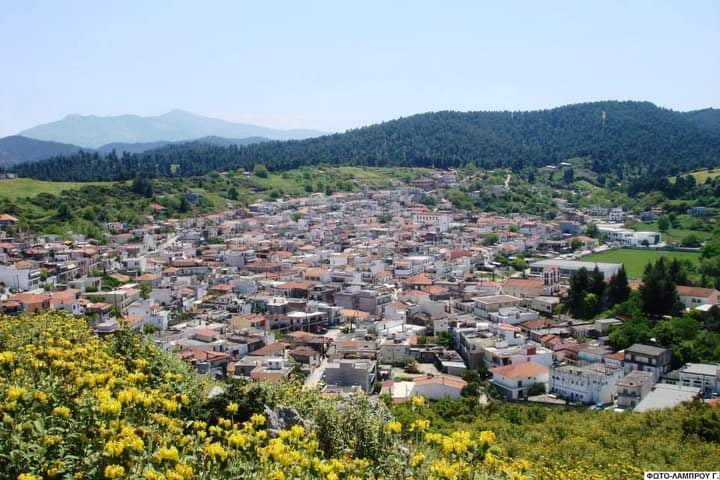
- Aerial view

- Location within Greece
- Coordinates: 38°47.9′N 23°28.7′E
- Country: Greece
- Administrative region: Central Greece
- Regional unit: Euboea
- Municipality: Mantoudi-Limni-Agia Anna
- Municipal unit: Kireas

Population (2021)
  - Community: 2,245
- Time zone: UTC+2 (EET)
  - Summer (DST): UTC+3 (EEST)

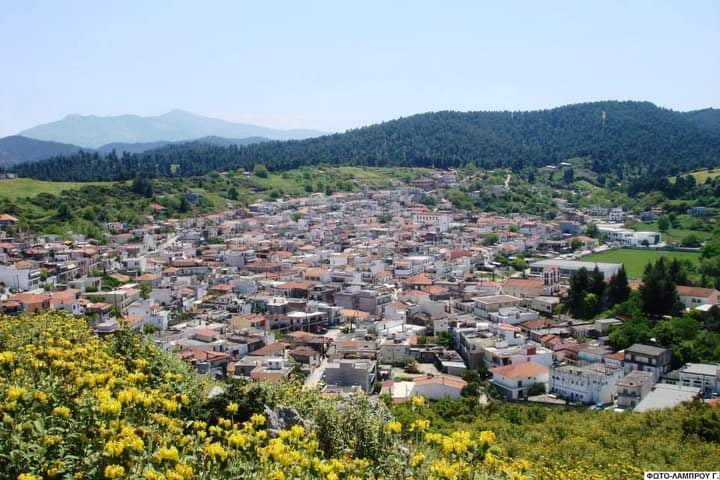
Aerial view of Mantoudi

Mantoudi (Greek: Μαντούδι) is a village in the municipal unit of Kireas, Euboea, Greece. Since the 2010 local government reform, it is part of the municipality Mantoudi-Limni-Agia Anna. It was the seat of the former municipality Kireas between 1997 and 2010. In 2021, its population was 2,245. It is situated 4 km from the northeast coast of Euboea, on the river Kireas.

== Navegation ==
There are ferries from Mantoudi to Skopelos.

== See also ==
- List of settlements in the Euboea regional unit
