= Champion Jet 2 =

Catamaran ferry owned by Seajets

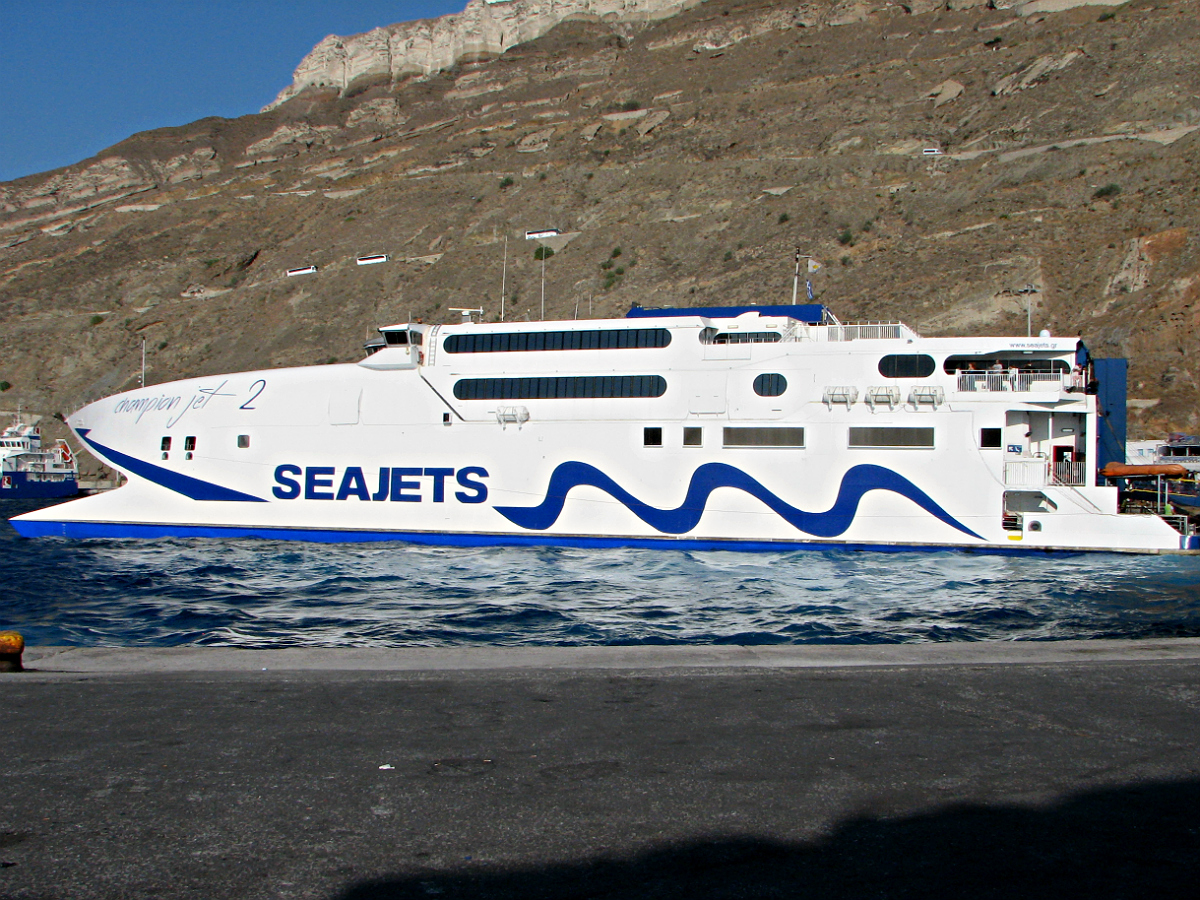
- Champion Jet 2 in Santorini

History
- Name: 1996-1997: Incat 042; 1997-2015: Condor Express; 2015-present: Champion Jet 2
- Owner: 1997-2014: Condor Ferries; 2015-present: Seajets
- Operator: 1997-2015: Condor Ferries; 2015-present: Seajets
- Port of registry: Limassol, Cyprus
- Route: 1997-2015 Poole/Weymouth - Channel Islands 2015 onwards - Santorini - Rethymno
- Builder: Incat, Tasmania, Australia
- Cost: £27 million
- Yard number: 042
- Laid down: 18 March 1996
- Launched: 24 November 1996
- Completed: 1996
- Maiden voyage: 31 January 1997
- Identification: IMO number: 9135896

General characteristics
- Tonnage: 5,007 gt
- Length: 86.62 m (284.2 ft)
- Beam: 26 m (85.3 ft)
- Draft: 3.5 m (11.5 ft)
- Installed power: 4 × 9,490bhp (7,080kw) Ruston 20RK270 diesel engines
- Propulsion: 4x Lips LJ145D waterjets
- Speed: up to 40 knots (74 km/h; 46 mph)
- Capacity: 800 passengers; 200 vehicles

Champion Jet 2 is a high-speed catamaran ferry owned and operarted by Seajets. Launched in 1996, she previously ran services between the United Kingdom and the Channel Islands for Condor Ferries as Condor Express. She was sold to Seajets in 2015 and currently operates in the Aegean Sea as Champion Jet 2.

== History ==
Champion Jet 2 was built in 1996 by Incat in Hobart, Australia originally for use by Condor Ferries then joint owned by Commodore Shipping of Guernsey and Holyman. The vessel known then as Condor Express, was the first of a series of four 86 metre catamarans.

=== Condor Ferries ===
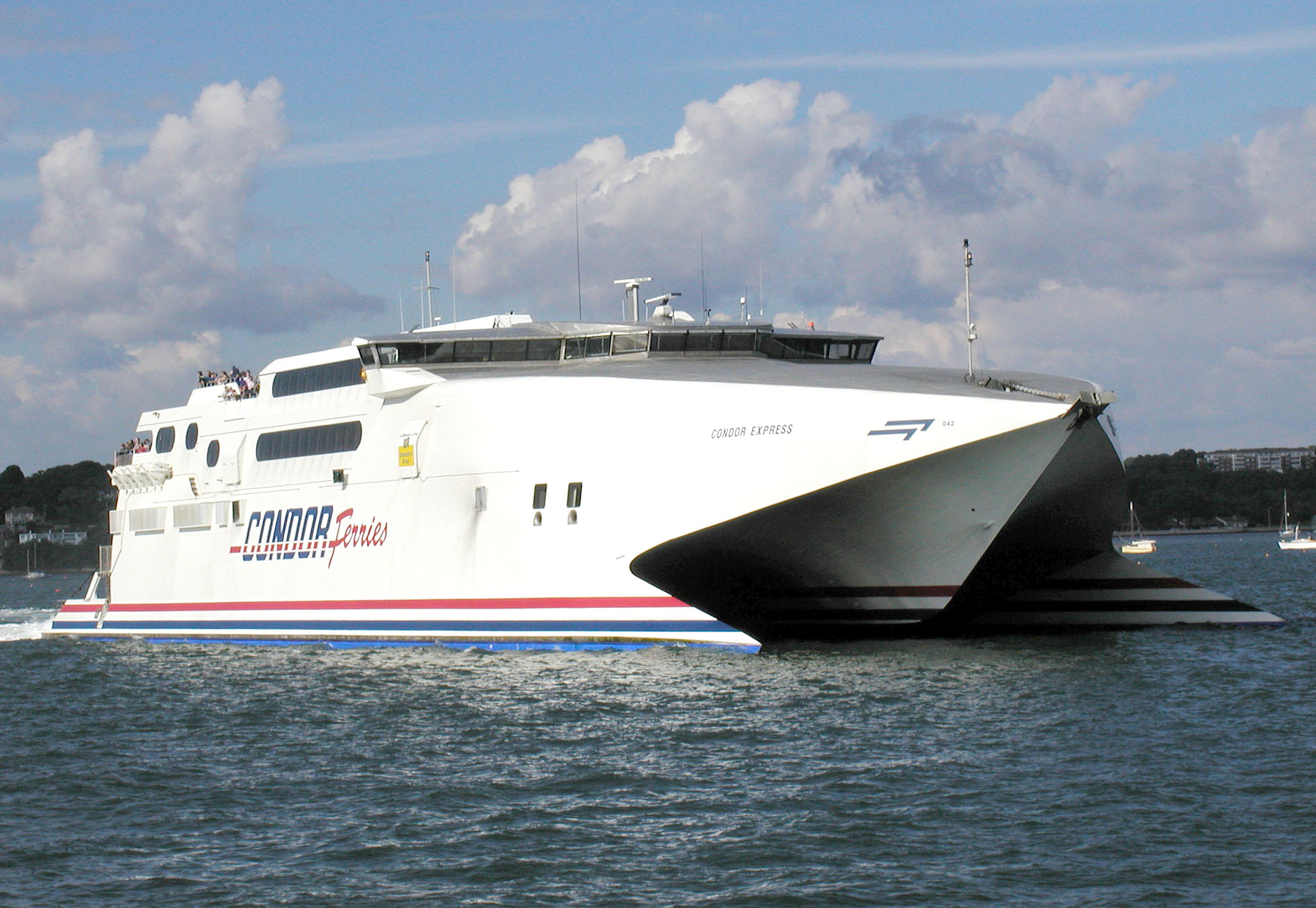
Condor Express in Poole Harbour, 2002

Condor Express arrived in her home waters from her builders in January 1997 and was opened to the public in Poole before taking up service between Weymouth and the Channel Islands later that month replacing Condor 12. On 1 March 1997, Condor Express opened the Poole-Channel Islands service for Condor Ferries after operating what was planned to be the last sailing from Weymouth for the company the day before. Condor Express' first year in service was marred by a series of technical problems resulting in delays and cancellation of what was now the only car and passenger ferry service to the Channel Islands. As a result of these problems the governments of Guernsey and Jersey put the licence to operate the service to England out to tender. Condor Express' engines were subsequently modified along with those of her sister ships and she provided a more reliable service based in Weymouth year round with seasonal services from Poole. As part of a bid to improve service as part of the tender agreement Condor Express and her sister Condor Vitesse were fitted with a Club Lounge and an area of reclining seats.

Condor Express received an updated version of the Condor Ferries livery in 2003.

In August 2005 Condor Express briefly ran on the Brittany Ferries Poole-Cherbourg service. She had been experiencing technical problems and so Condor Vitesse was transferred to the more taxing Channel Islands service. During this time Condor Express did not sail to St Malo, instead running an afternoon round trip to Cherbourg to ensure she would return to Poole in time for the 07:30 Brittany Ferries departure time. Condor Express ran once again for Brittany Ferries on 19 May 2008.

=== Seajets ===
On 14 January 2015, it was announced that she would be sold to Greek firm Seajets with her sister ship HSC Condor Vitesse, owing to her replacement by Condor Liberation. Seajets renamed it Champion Jet 2.

== Accidents and incidents ==
A serious incident occurred on 28 July 2007 when HD1 of HD Ferries, while manoeuvring in Jersey Harbour, collided with Condor Express which was berthed at the time. HD1 was holed above the waterline while Condor Express suffered only minor damage to its paintwork. Condor issued a press release on 3 August 2007 condemning HD Ferries, which HD responded to with its own press release. HD1 later had its wave height limit reduced from 2.5 metres to 2m (Condor being able to operate its larger fastcraft in seas up to 3.5 metres), and on 19 August 2007 the HD Ferries ramp permit for Jersey and Guernsey was withdrawn, preventing the company from operating. It recommenced operations on 25 August 2007. In a press release issued on 2 October 2007, HD Ferries stated that it was preparing to take legal action against Condor concerning the statement published by the company on 3 August 2007, but this was not done. Following HD Ferries' decision to withdraw its service early in September 2008 and not operate a winter service, the States of Jersey indicated that HD Ferries was unlikely to be allowed a ramp licence again.

== Sister ships ==
- Champion Jet 1
- Champion Jet 3
- Tarifa Jet
