= Pepita Castellví =

Fast ferry built in 2010

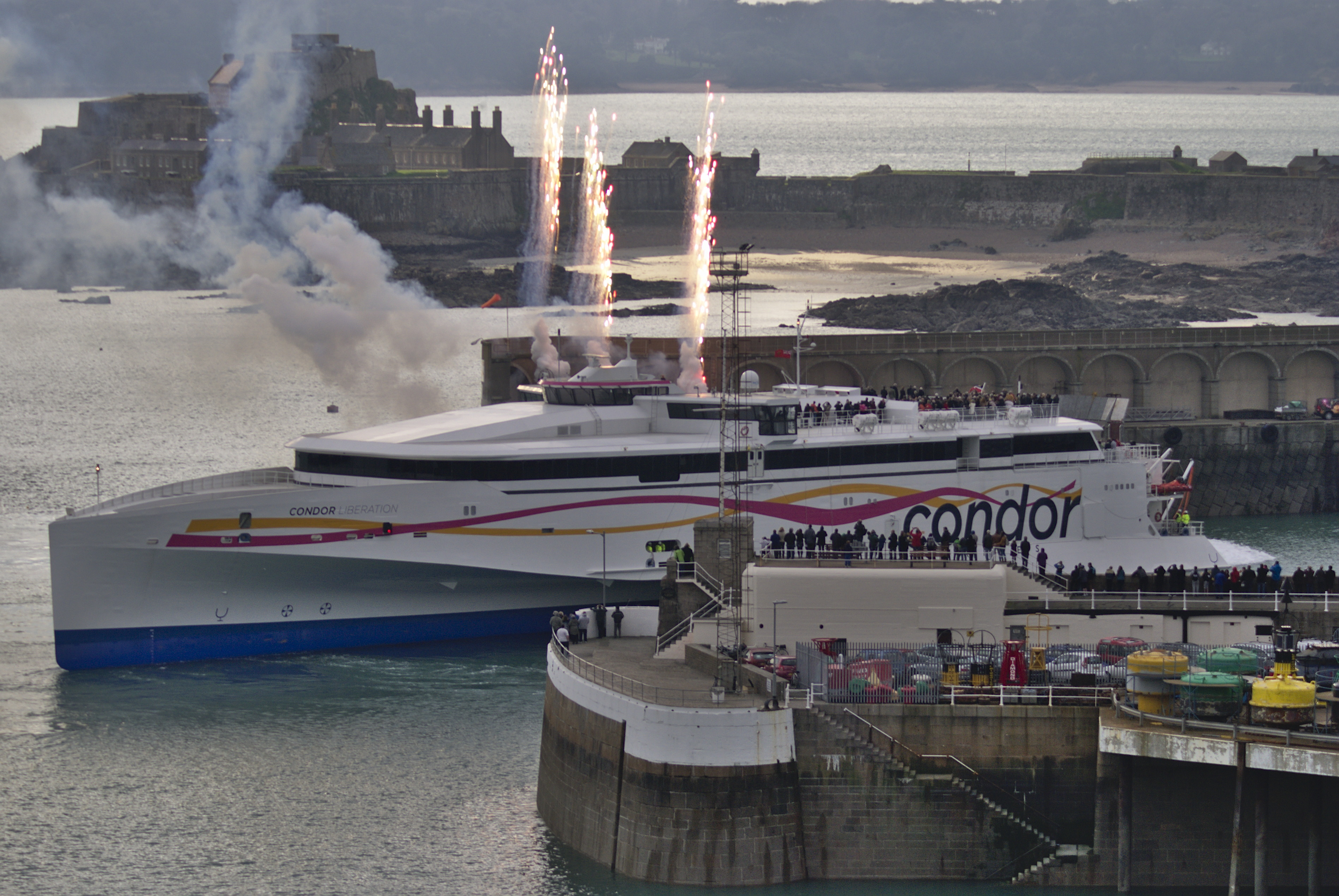
- Pepita Castellvi as Condor Liberation in 2015

History
- Name: 2010–2014: Austal 270; 2014–2015: Condor 102; 2015–2025: Condor Liberation; 2025–2026: Overview; 2026–present: Pepita Castellví
- Namesake: Josefina Castellví
- Owner: 2014–2025: Condor Ferries; 2025–2026: Overview Shipping; 2026–present: Baleària
- Operator: 2015–2025: Condor Ferries; 2026–present: Baleària
- Port of registry: Cyprus
- Route: Los Cristianos–La Gomera–La Palma
- Builder: Austal, Henderson, Western Australia
- Yard number: 270
- Launched: 15 December 2009
- In service: 27 March 2015
- Identification: IMO number: 9551363

General characteristics
- Type: High Speed Vessel (Trimaran)
- Tonnage: 6,307 GT
- Length: 102 m (335 ft)
- Beam: 27.95 m (91.7 ft)
- Propulsion: 3 x 20 cyl MTU 20V8000M71L, 12,203bhp each at 1150rpm. Each engine 347.4 litres.
- Speed: 39 knots (72 km/h; 45 mph)
- Capacity: 800 passengers + crew

Pepita Castellví is a high-speed trimaran ferry owned by Baleària and operated under its Baleària Canarias division between Los Cristianos, La Gomera and La Palma. Built by Austal in Henderson, Western Australia as Austal 270, she was purchased by Condor Ferries as Condor 102, and entered service with the company as Condor Liberation in 2015, operating between Poole and the Channel Islands. Following her purchase by Overview Shipping as Overview in late 2025, she was eventually sold on to Baleària in 2026, later being renamed as Pepita Castellvi.

She is named after the Spanish oceanographer, Josefina Castellví.

== Concept and Construction ==
Originally named Austal 270, it was built by Austal at its shipyard in Henderson, Western Australia as a speculative order. It was launched in January 2010 and was laid up at the shipyard for four years before an owner was found.

In 2012, Austal entered into a charter agreement with the company Euroferries for the Austal 102. The ferry was planned to operate between Ramsgate and Boulogne from 2013, but this never materialised.

== Service ==
=== 2014–2025: Condor Ferries ===
In 2012, Condor Ferries had its operational permit to run Channel Island services extended until 2019. Subsequently, it purchased Austal 270, renaming it to Condor Liberation following a public competition, in homage of the Liberation of the Channel Islands from German occupation. After being modified at Austal's Philippines yard, it entered service with Condor on 27 March 2015 operating out of Poole, replacing both the Condor Express and Condor Vitesse.

Between 2022 and 2023, Condor operated fast-ferry services between Poole, Portsmouth, and Cherbourg using the Condor Liberation during the summer months for the French operator Brittany Ferries. Services from Cherbourg to Guernsey were also offered, but were pulled from the timetable in 2024.

On 10 February 2025, it was announced that Condor Ferries had put the ship up for sale.

On 25 March 2025, Condor Liberation operated her last commercial fast ferry sailing with Condor Ferries from Poole to both Jersey and Guernsey, shortly before Condor was absorbed into Brittany Ferries. The vessel departed Poole for the final time on 28 March 2025 and sailed to Le Havre, where she was laid up awaiting sale.

In late 2025, the ferry was sold to Overview Shipping Inc and renamed as Overview.

=== 2026–present: Baleària ===
In 2026, it was reported that the vessel had been sold to Spanish operator Baleària. She was renamed Pepita Castellví after the Spanish oceanographer. Following her sale, the ferry left Le Harve under tow to Algericas for a refit.

She entered service later in June and currently operates in a triangular route between Los Cristianos, La Gomera, and La Palma, under the Baleària Canarias division

== Accidents and issues in service ==
On 28 March 2015, the day after she entered official commercial service, Condor Liberation hit the quayside in Guernsey in strong winds. The collision caused damage to her hull which prevented further use of the vessel until repaired. She was taken out of service and was transferred to Poole where the damage was repaired. Passengers had to wait for Commodore Clipper to take them back to the UK, albeit to Portsmouth instead of Poole.

A report on the collision was published on 27 May 2015 and concluded that the fendering on the berth was insufficient for high speed craft and ruled out any wrongdoing of the ship's crew.

Condor Liberation has received numerous reports from passengers about the vessel's rolling characteristics. Notably an incident on 18 May 2015 prompted in excess of 50 reports of "Corkscrewing" in two metre seas on her evening sailing from Guernsey to Poole. This included a video filmed on board at the time of the incident clearly showing Condor Liberation rolling heavily. Condor later reiterated the safety of the vessel noting the important difference between safety (and stability) and ride comfort.

Amid reports of ride problems and procedures for passenger embarkation (involving embarking via car decks for foot passengers), it was reported that the Maritime & Coastguard Agency (MCA) would launch an investigation into the vessel's suitability to operate in the waters of the English Channel. It was later claimed by Condor that the MCA would not be launching an investigation, and would instead "follow up this matter with the flag state and the owners, to address the concerns being raised". In the end, the MCA investigated the vessel.

Condor remained mainly quiet on the issues surrounding Condor Liberation. The Guernsey External Transport Group requested a meeting with Condor to discuss the ongoing safety concerns and punctuality of the new vessel, which concluded with the Head of the Transport Group, Deputy Kevin Stewart, advising the public to "stop putting the boot in on Condor". Public outcry for this followed.

Guernsey's harbourmaster, noted as a former Condor Ferries employee by the local media, suggested in a media interview that members of the public "retrain their stomachs" for the vessel's ride. He later confirmed that his remark was taken out of context, and was, in fact, referring to the difference in riding behaviour between the older catamaran HSCs to which the public were accustomed and those of the new trimaran vessel.

Doug Bannister, Ports of Jersey chief executive, said they had been inundated with complaints about Condor, adding that they were currently reviewing parts of the operating agreement. He commented "What is important to make certain is that the travelling public in Jersey feel safe and it is a service that the Island wants".
