= HD Ferries =

Ferry service between Jersey and Brittany

- Industry: Passenger transportation Freight transportation
- Founded: 2007
- Defunct: 2009
- Fate: Dissolved
- Headquarters: St Helier, Jersey
- Area served: Channel Islands

HD Ferries was a short-lived fast catamaran ferry company based in St Helier, Jersey. The company had daily departures (six crossings per day; average crossing time per leg of just one hour) from Jersey to Guernsey and initially onwards to Cherbourg and later St Malo.

== History ==
HD Ferries was established in January 2007 following the cessation of Emeraude Lines in November 2005. Earlier, Condor Ferries and Emeraude Lines were the only two services operating in the region. The States of Jersey, States of Guernsey and Regional Council of Brittany required an additional ferry service to meet the demand for passenger and freight travel between the Channel Islands and France. The Jersey authorities had been attempting to encourage other companies to start a rival service to Condor, to maintain a competitive environment.

In June 2007, HD Ferries announced that it planned to incorporate Alderney and Cherbourg into the route. Following a berthing trial in Alderney, harbourmaster Steve Shaw gave HD Ferries the go-ahead subject to certain conditions. The Alderney service never started.

=== Operations ===
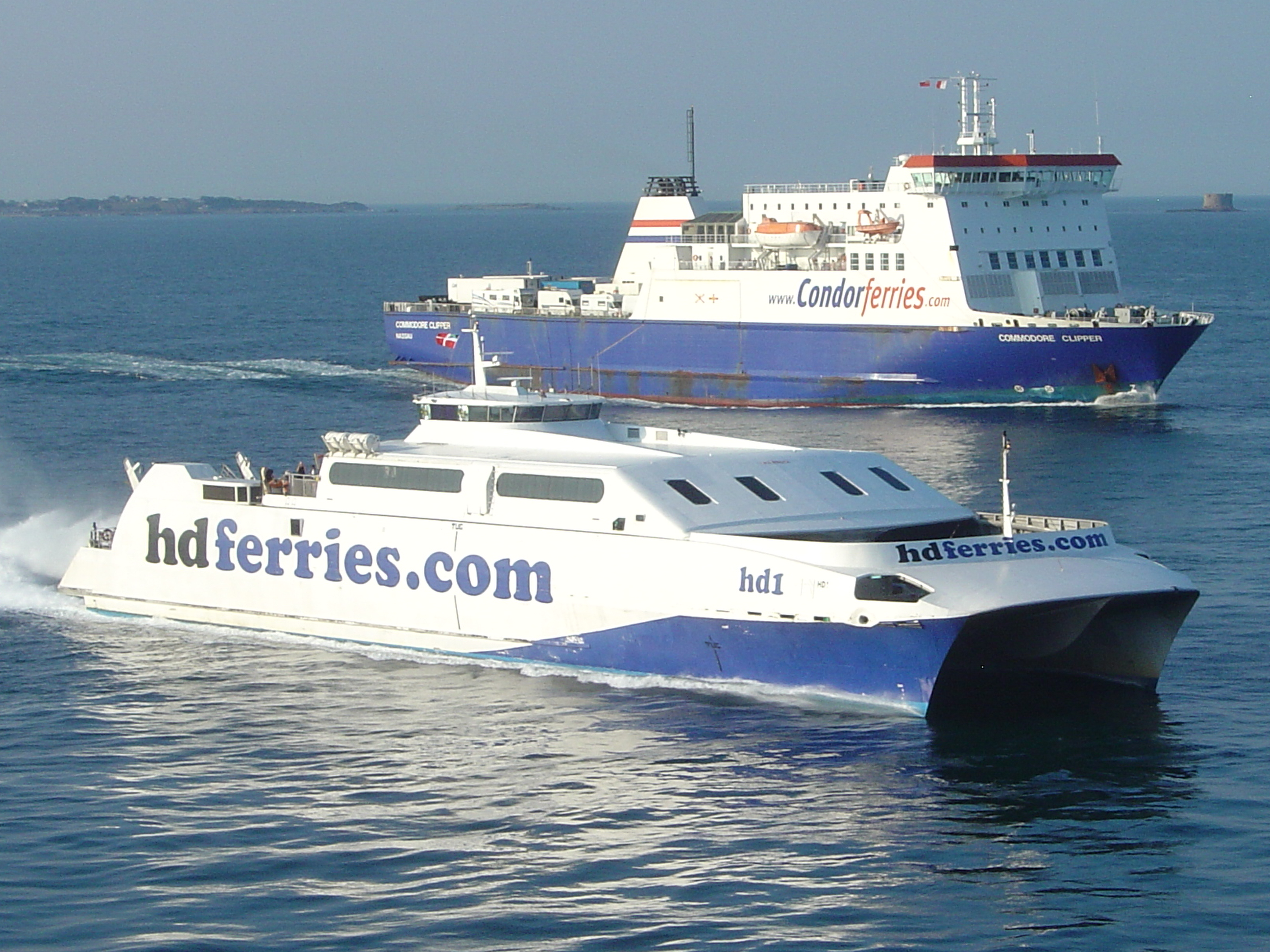
HD1 passing the Commodore Clipper

HD Ferries made its first successful sailing to Cherbourg on 6 August 2007, marking the start of its new twice-weekly service between Jersey/Guernsey and Cherbourg. The HD Ferries service grew its presence within the Channel Islands with an increasing number of local residents, holiday makers and freight drivers using the service on a daily basis.

During its short history, HD Ferries was involved in two collision incidents with Condor Ferries whilst the competitors' ships were alongside.

Due to a lack of customers, the Cherbourg link was soon dropped in favour of a direct link with Guernsey to St Malo. The direct St Malo to Guernsey link was dropped in mid-August 2008 after about two months operating.

HD Ferries proposed plans to operate a service alongside Condor Ferries on the northern routes to the UK mainland, but this was another failure and never happened. The company would have had to secure at least one additional vessel to enable this.

=== Demise ===
HD Ferries ceased all services from 7 September 2008, after giving customers who had booked tickets four days' notice. The company claimed that it would return in 2009.

HD Ferries said on 12 February 2009 that "there are currently no sailings scheduled for 2009" - although they advised customers to check for updates regularly on the company's website.

On 16 February 2009, HD Ferries officially announced that they would not be returning, leaving a parting blast at the Jersey authorities, claiming a lack of support.

== Fleet ==
HD1 is a high-speed catamaran with top speeds of 45 knots. Belonging to the Incat K class, she has a capacity of 400 passengers and 100 cars, or 70 cars and 10 freight vehicles.

HD1 was sold in 2009 to the Korean company Dae A Express Shipping and was renamed Moon Flower. In 2013, she was renamed HSC Orange and later Harmony Flower. She operates in the Yellow Sea.
