= Champion Jet 3 =

Catamaran type fast ferry

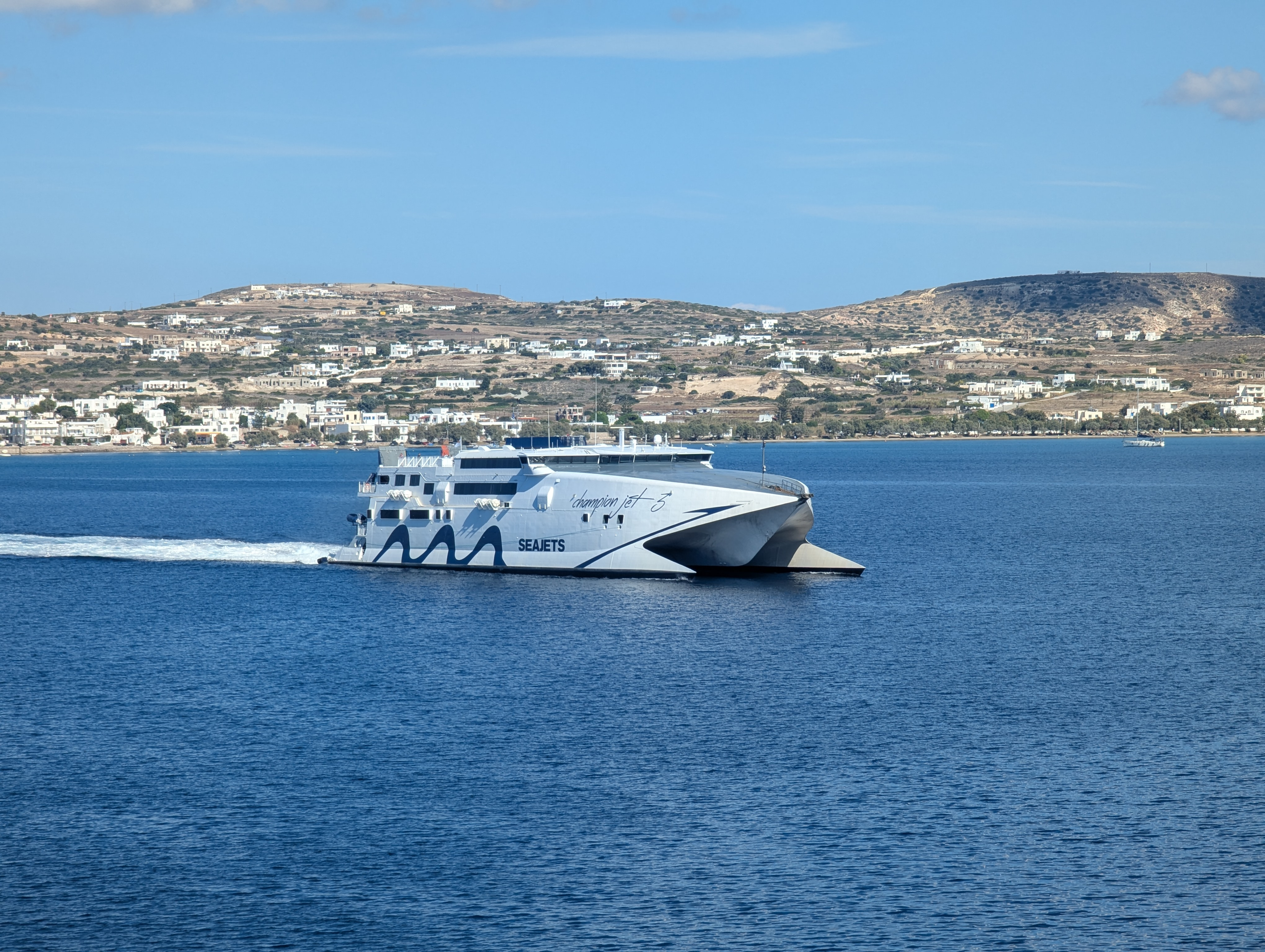
- Champion Jet 3 near Milos

History
- Name: 1997-1999: Incat 045; 1999-2002: HMAS Jervis Bay; 2002-2004: Incat 045; 2004-2009: SpeedOne; 2009-2010: Sea Leopard; 2010-2021: Condor Rapide; 2021-2023: Incat 045; 2023-present: Champion Jet 3
- Owner: 1997-2008: Incat; 2008-2009: SpeedFerries; 2009-2010: Epic Shipping; 2010-2021: Condor Ferries; 2021-2023: Trasmapi; 2023-present: Seajets
- Operator: 1997-1999: Transport Tasmania; 1999-2001: Royal Australian Navy; 2001-2002: Laid up; 2002-2002: TRIS; 2002-2004: Laid up; 2004-2008: SpeedFerries; 2008-2010: Laid up; 2010-2021: Condor Ferries; 2021-2023: Trasmapi; 2023-present: Seajets
- Port of registry: Cyprus
- Builder: Incat, Tasmania, Australia
- Yard number: 045
- Launched: November 1997
- Identification: IMO number: 9161560

General characteristics
- Type: High-speed catamaran
- Tonnage: 5,007 GT
- Displacement: 1,250 tons
- Length: 86.62 m (284.2 ft)
- Beam: 26 m (85 ft)
- Draught: 3.6 m (12 ft)
- Speed: 48 knots (89 km/h; 55 mph)
- Capacity: 900 passengers (later reduced to 670); 200 cars

Champion Jet 3 is a high-speed catamaran ferry owned and operated by Seajets. Launched in 1997, she was initially chartered out as a civilian ferry, then became the first large catamaran to enter military service when she was commissioned into the Royal Australian Navy as HMAS Jervis Bay from 1999 to 2001.

In 2002, she returned to civilian use, chartered to the Italian company TRIS. From 2004, she was chartered by SpeedFerries for its Dover to Boulogne-sur-Mer service. Renamed SpeedOne and later purchased outright by the company, she operated on this route until French authorities impounded her in late 2008, as the SpeedFerries had failed to pay taxes. SpeedFerries was placed into administration shortly after, and the ferry was laid up until 2010, when she was purchased by Condor Ferries for operations between the Channel Islands and St Malo as Condor Rapide. She was then sold in 2021 to Spanish operator Trasmapi as Incat 045. Having failed to enter service with Trasmapi, she was sold to Seajets in 2023, and currently operates in the Aegean Sea as Champion Jet 3.

== History ==
Constructed by Incat in Hobart, Australia and named Incat 045, the 86-metre (282 ft) catamaran was launched in November 1997. She was chartered out to Spirit of Tasmania between 14–27 July 1997 as a ferry across Bass Strait, then was returned to the shipyard. In May 1999, the catamaran was chartered by the Australian government for logistics and transport operations. The ship was commissioned into the Royal Australian Navy as HMAS Jervis Bay, becoming the first large catamaran in military service.

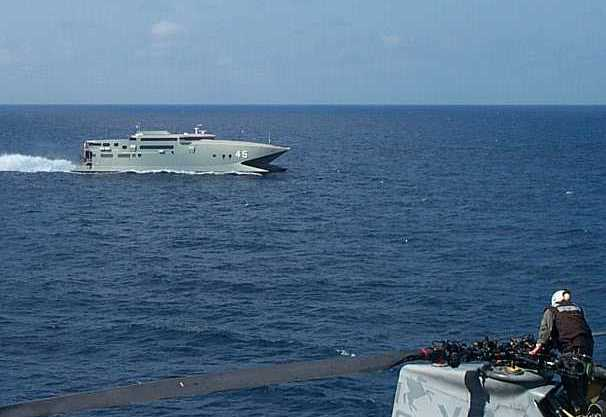
Incat 045 operating as HMAS Jervis Bay in 2000

The ship was primarily used as a troop and equipment transport between Darwin and Dili in support of the International Force for East Timor peacekeeping operation. Jervis Bay was decommissioned on 11 May 2001, resuming her original name. In 2002, Incat 045 was chartered to Italian ferry company TRIS and sailed between Genoa and Palau, Italy under the marketing name of Winner until the collapse of the company later that year.

=== SpeedFerries ===
Following the collapse of TRIS, the ferry was laid up in Portland, England until 2004. The ferry was chartered by SpeedFerries, renamed SpeedOne, and registered in Dover, England. The ferry was assigned to operate between Dover and Boulogne-sur-Mer in France.

On 28 December 2007, SpeedOne collided with the Prince of Wales Pier in Dover, ripping a hole in the side of the ferry. No passengers were aboard at the time, and the damage was repaired for the ship to resume operations on 31 December.

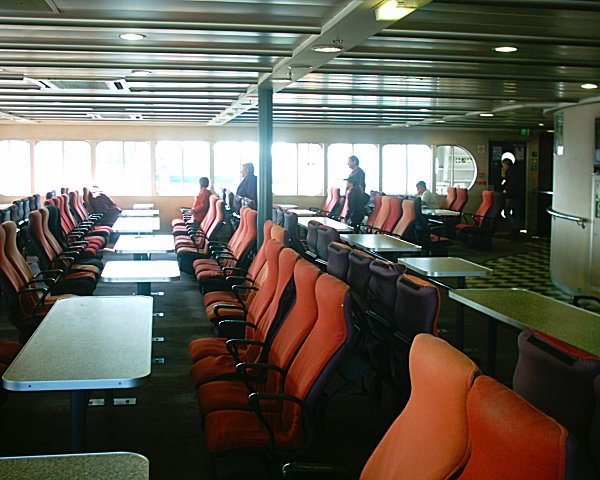
The passenger lounge onboard SpeedOne

On 6 November 2008, SpeedOne was detained in Boulogne-sur-Mer in a dispute over non-paid harbour duties and taxes. SpeedFerries was placed into administration on 13 November, and services were cancelled. The ferry was detained until 20 November, when she left France and sailed to Tilbury, where she was laid up awaiting charter.

On 11 May 2009, SpeedOne was renamed Sea Leopard. In the early summer of 2009 the vessel was given a single voyage dispensation and moved from Tilbury to A&P. Falmouth to undergo repairs and reactivation, where she remained for around three months. On completion of works, including a full overhaul on all four main engines, she returned to Tilbury in September 2009 to await sale.

=== Condor Ferries ===
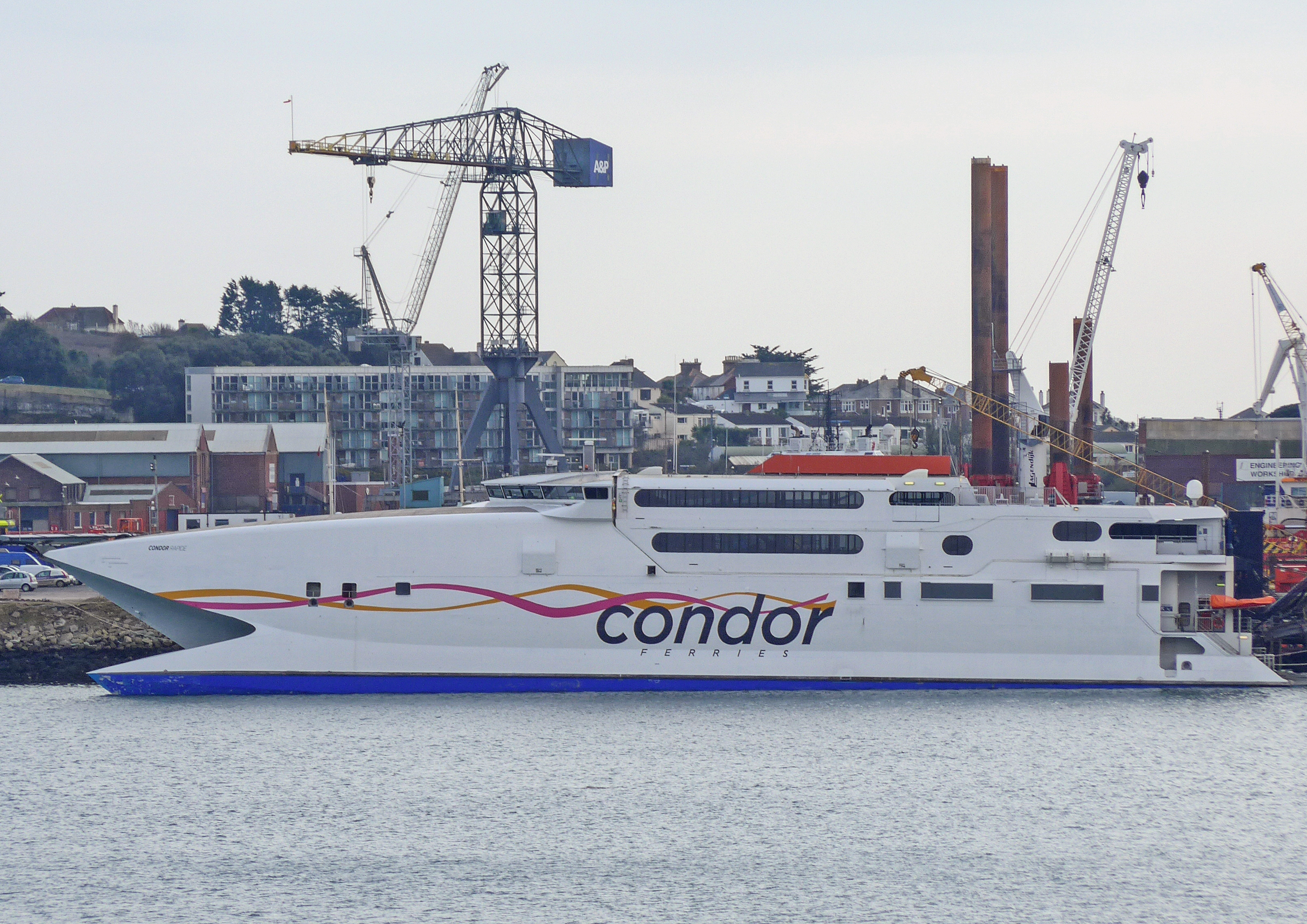
Condor Rapide in 2016

In March 2010 the vessel was purchased by Condor Ferries and renamed Condor Rapide, replacing Condor 10 on the Guernsey / Jersey to St Malo route.

Condor Rapide transported both vehicles and foot passengers between the Channel Islands and France and due to the higher ramp capacity, larger freight vehicles are able to use ro-ro services that were previously unavailable on a daily scheduled basis.

=== Trasmapi ===
Upon Condor's announcement of the introduction of the larger Condor Voyager, Condor Rapide was sold to Spanish ferry operator Trasmapi in 2021. After departing Poole in July 2021, the vessel sailed to Vigo to be laid up, and was renamed Incat 045.

However, the Port Authority in Algericas refused docking permission for the vessel and it remained laid up for many months. The vessel never entered service throughout its ownership under Trasmapi.

=== Seajets ===
In August 2023, Seajets purchased the vessel to operate services on its fast ferry network in Greece, with it renamed Champion Jet 3.

== Accidents and Incidents ==
On 28 June 2025, while docking at the port of Paroikia in Paros, the vessel's bow made contact with pier 2. The ship was operating a scheduled itinerary from Piraeus to Naxos, Koufonisia, Schinoussa, and Irakleia, carrying 1,012 passengers, 34 crew members, and 92 vehicles.

It successfully tied up at the pier to safely disembark its passengers and vehickles. A portion of the passengers were transferred to alternative vessels arranged by the operating company to complete their journeys. No injuries or marine pollution resulted from the incident. Local port authorities initially detained the ship, but it was permitted to resume its voyage with the remaining passengers after a technical inspection and the submission of a certificate maintaining its class.

== Sister ships ==
- Champion Jet 1
- Champion Jet 2
- Tarifa Jet
