= Condor Ferries =

Former ferry company in the Channel Islands

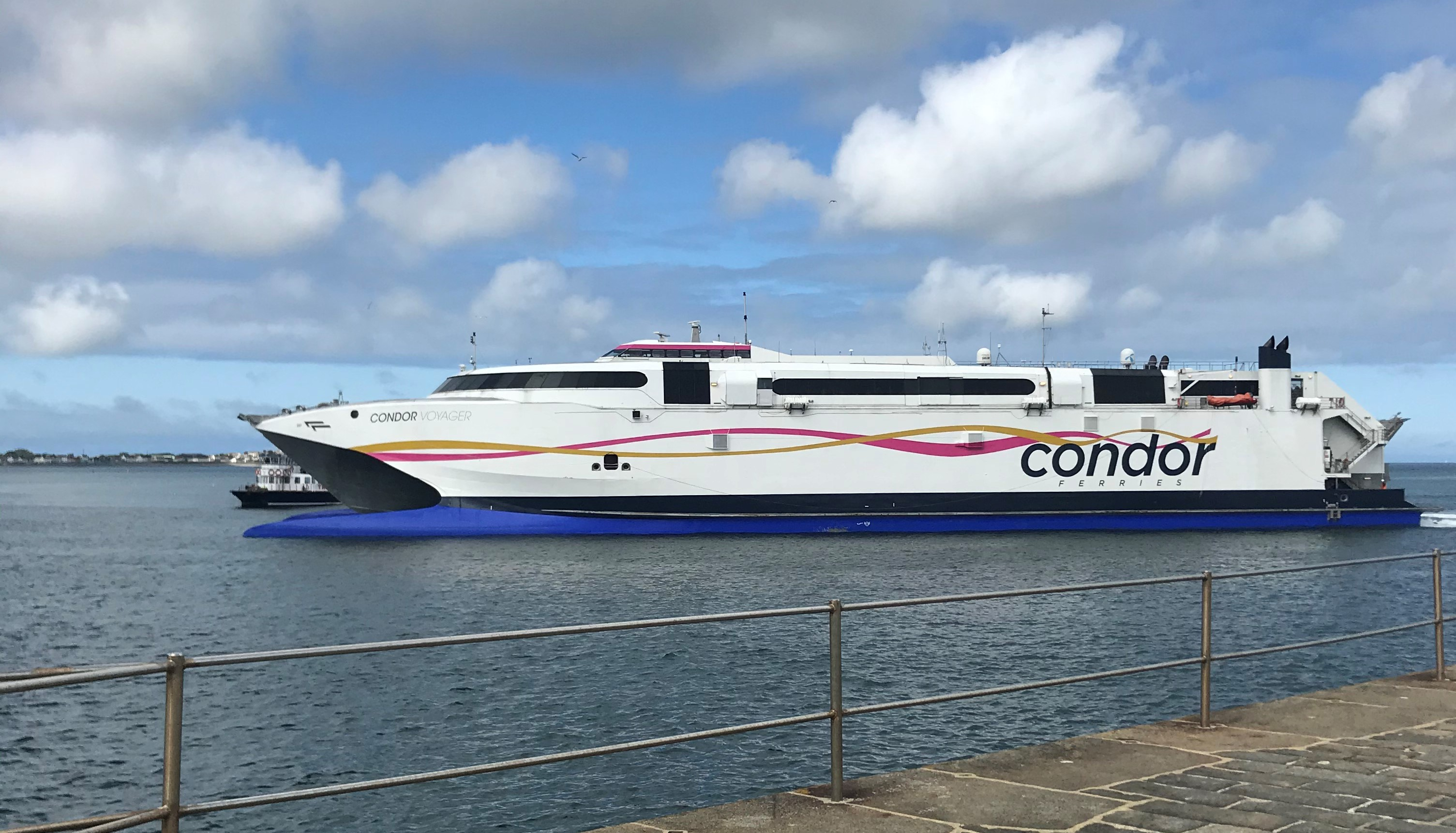
- Condor Voyager arriving into Guernsey in 2021
- Type: Limited
- Founded: 1964
- Founder: Peter Dorey; Jack Norman
- Defunct: 2025
- Fate: Absorbed into Brittany Ferries
- Successor: Brittany Ferries; DFDS Seaways
- Headquarters: St. Peter Port, Guernsey
- Area served: Channel Islands; Southern England; Brittany
- Key people: Russell Kew (Executive Chairman); Christophe Mathieu (CEO)
- Services: Passenger and freight transportation
- Parent: 1964-1983: Onesimus Dorey & Sons and Commodore Shipping; 1983-1992: Commodore Shipping; 1992-1994: Commodore Shipping and Thomas Nationwide Transport; 1994-1998: Commodore Shipping and Holyman; 1998-2002: Commodore Group; 2004-2008: Royal Bank of Scotland; 2008-2019: Macquarie Group; 2019-2025: Brittany Ferries and Columbia Threadneedle Investments
- Website: condorferries.co.uk

Condor Ferries Limited, commonly known as Condor, was a Channel Island shipping company based in St. Peter Port, Guernsey. Founded in 1964, it operated a variety of passenger and freight services between France, Guernsey, Jersey and Southern England.

Condor Ferries had several owners during its operational history before being taken over by Brittany Ferries in 2025.

== History ==
Condor Ltd was formed in 1964 by Channel Island businessmen Peter Dorey and Jack Norman. Condor was two-thirds owned by Onesimus Dorey & Sons, led by Dorey, with the remaining third largely held by Jack Norman of Commodore Shipping, linking the two companies. The company originally operated services only between the Channel Islands and Saint-Malo, which commenced on 1 May 1964. The formation of the company was in response to the uncertainty in the islands created by the withdrawal from this route of SS Brittany by British Railways in November 1962.

In a 2014 interview with the Guernsey Press, Dorey's son, Rupert, recalled "it was a ballsy, risky thing to do to start the business in the first place in 1964, with no guarantees of success. It was very innovative at the time, but it wasn't even clear whether the local waters would suit the hydrofoil boat, and there were problems to overcome. It made losses for two or three years, but then they rolled the dice, decided to double up the service and buy another boat, it was one huge risk, but it paid off."

The initial series of Condor vessels were all hydrofoil passenger ferries, with the exception of Condor 6 which was a passenger only catamaran.

Peter Dorey was lost at sea in a sailing accident whilst competing in the 1979 Fastnet Race, with his interest passing to his wife, Tattie. Four years later, in July 1983, Commodore Shipping acquired all remaining shares in Condor, which it did not own, with David Norman being appointed managing director. In the same month, Condor carried their four millionth passenger.

The failure of the joint venture between Sealink British Ferries and Channel Island Ferries in September 1986 and the resulting strike provided Condor with an opportunity to introduce an already mooted service between the Channel Islands and Weymouth. As preparations were already under consideration for a service to the Dorset port for the 1987 season, the set up was swift and took advantage of the limited capacity available due to the strikes. During the first 18-day period of operation, 18,000 passengers were carried, proving the viability of the route. Further success on the route saw the announcement of a larger vessel to be introduced in June 1988, although ultimately this was delayed, resulting in a change of tack; Condor announced in 1990 their intention to purchase their first car-carrying vessel from Incat in 1992.

In 1992, the Australian logistics and transport company, TNT, acquired a 50% shareholding in Condor Ferries.

=== Expansion ===
Condor established the first high-speed car ferry service to the Channel Islands from Weymouth on 1 April 1993 using the 74m Incat catamaran Condor 10. The original delivery date had been 1992, but the order was delayed by Condor due to technical issues with Condor 9.

The success of the Condor 10 service saw the announcement in January 1994 that, due to their substantial losses the previous season, British Channel Island Ferries (BCIF), which operated conventional ferry services to the Channel Islands from Poole, had been taken over by one of Condor's parent companies, Commodore Shipping. Upon the BCIF takeover, Condor moved all passenger services to Weymouth and the BCIF freight service was transferred to Commodore Shipping. The BCIF vessel Havelet ran a conventional ferry service from Weymouth from 1994, on a three year charter, alongside the Condor 10. Operations of under the BCIF name would cease on 22 January 1994, with around 100 staff being made redundant from that date.

TNT's 50% share in Condor was spun-off just two years after their purchase with the rest of TNT's Shipping and Development Division and floated on the Australian Securities Exchange. to become part of Holyman.

Société Nouvelle d'Armement Transmanche (SNAT), which ran SNCF's shipping division, entered into a pooling agreement in 1994 with Condor Ferries to fill capacity on SNAT's Channiland Ferries services, launched in 1992. Channiland's ship Saint Malo carried the logos of both companies. The pooling agreement and Channiland services came to a swift end after an April 1995 incident when Saint Malo struck a rock known as La Frouquie, 900 metres north of La Corbière. At least 65 of the 307 passengers were injured and the craft was severely damaged. It eventually entered services with Condor themselves as Condor France.

In 1995, private equity firm 3i took a one-third stake in Condor and the company formally adopted the trading name Condor Ferries and a new red and blue livery, and the following year an application to run a high-speed service between Jersey and St Malo was refused by the Jersey Harbours and Airport Committee, leaving Emeraude Lines as the only vehicle ferry operator on that route.

=== New UK bases, purchase of the Havelet and Condor Vitesse ===
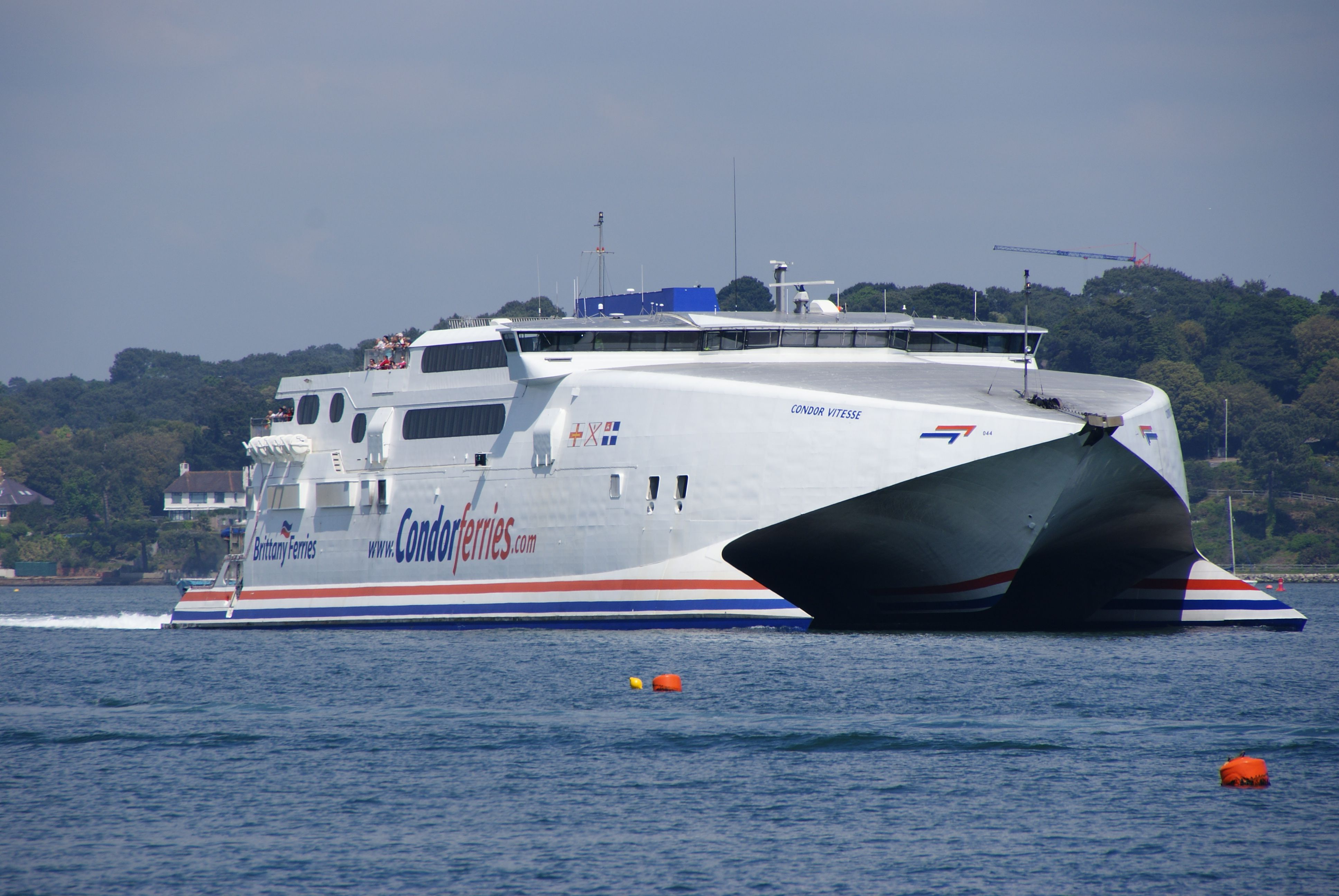
Condor Vitesse near Poole in 2010

In March 1997, Condor moved its UK port from Weymouth to Poole. The Condor Express suffered technical problems that led to late-running services. As a result, the Channel Island governments put the licence to operate ferry services to the UK out to tender, announcing this on 15 October 1997.

The Jersey Transport Authority and Guernsey Transport Board advertised for an operator to provide year-round services from 1 January 1999, initially attracting nine expressions of interest. Ultimately, the only three firms to submit proposals were Condor, P&O European Ferries and Hoverspeed. Condor's bid proposed using Condor Express and Condor Vitesse with Condor 9 as a back-up vessel, Hoverspeed proposed a service using SuperSeaCat One, a conventional ferry and if demand required it; a second fast ferry, and P&O proposed a service using Superstar Express and Pride of Bruges on their services. By June of 1998, it had become clear that Guernsey favoured the P&O bid, with Jersey favouring Condor, something which would leave the then deemed impractical situation of the two islands being served by different operations, and in any case, neither bid had been based on this scenario. Eventually, after a meeting between both island authorities, it was resolved to award Condor the tender for a three-year period from the following January. During these negotiations, Holyman's 50% stake in Condor was sold back to Commodore Shipping, giving them, once again, full ownership of Condor Ferries.

One of the conditions of Condor retaining its service agreement was the need to provide a conventional backup vessel from October 1998. Condor was therefore forced to purchase the Havelet in September to act as an all-weather back-up until the delivery of a new conventional vessel in 1999. It also purchased the Condor Vitesse for a new service to St. Malo via Guernsey and made Weymouth its primary UK port, though retaining summer sailings from Poole. The new conventional ferry Commodore Clipper was delivered on 25 September 1999, replacing Havelet, and the Island Commodore of Commodore Ferries. Both Condor and Commodore branding were worn by the ferry. The introduction of Commodore Clipper was the first new-build conventional ferry for Channel Islands services since the Caesarea and Sarnia introduced by British Railways between 1960 and 1961.

Starting in 2001, Condor announced a joint service with Brittany Ferries to run Condor Vitesse on a fast route between Poole and Cherbourg. The Brittany Ferries logo was added to the vessel, and Brittany Ferries marketed her under the name Vitesse.

=== Re-introduction of Condor 10, management buy-out, rebranding and sale ===
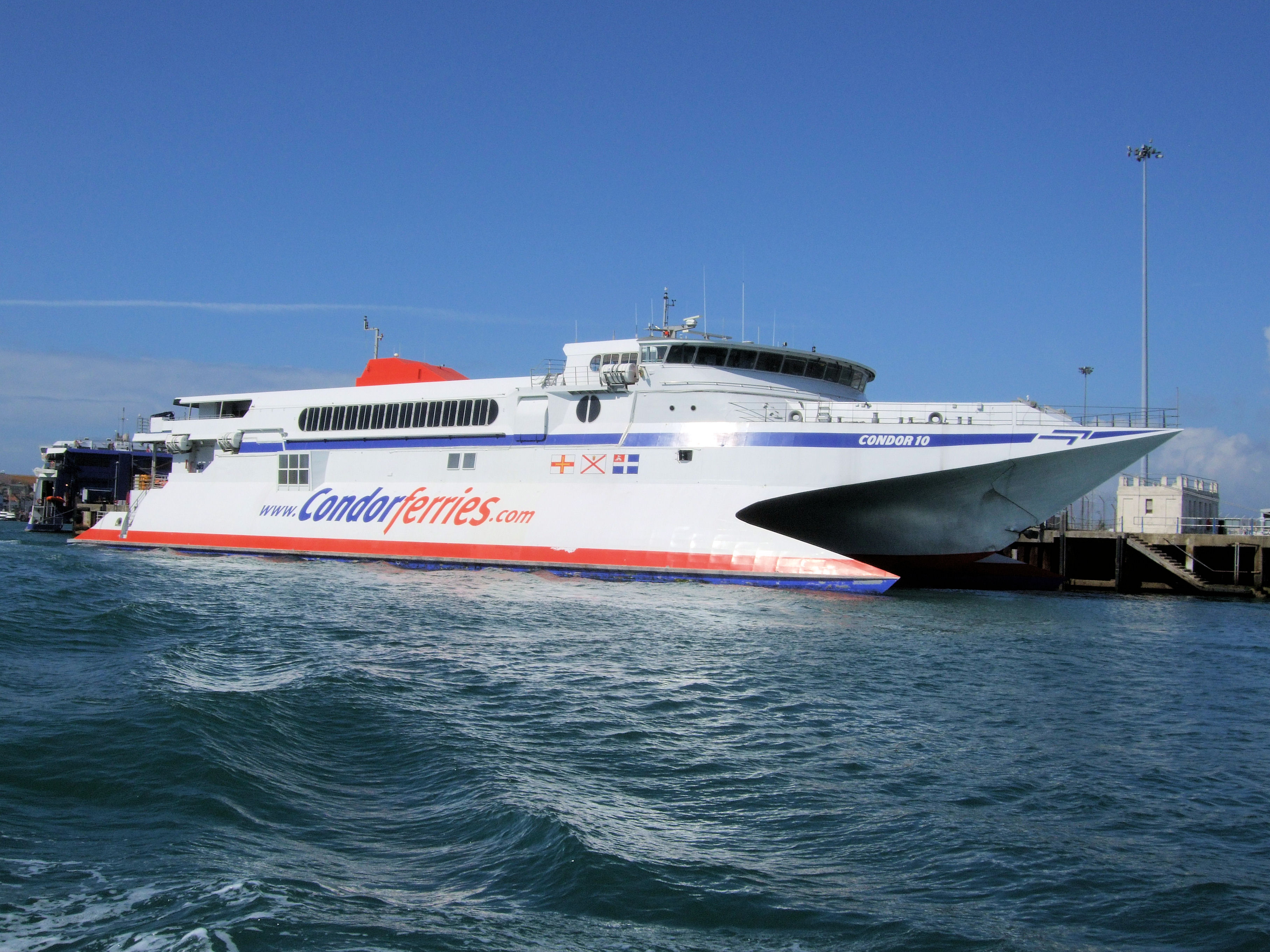
Condor 10 alongside Weymouth in 2010

Condor 10 returned to the fleet in March 2002 to replace the Condor 9 on the Saint-Malo – Channel Island service and would go on to fully compete with the existing fast car ferry service of Emeraude Lines from March 2003. Later that year, the Commodore Group, which included Condor Ferries, Commodore Ferries and Commodore Express, was sold to a management buy-out team for a reported £150 million deal, backed by ABN AMRO. This, ironically, saw the cessation of Channel Islands control of the firm, something which had been championed during the 1998 service agreement negotiations. Shortly after, the Condor Ferries logo was redesigned for the start of the 2003 season using the same font as the logo Brittany Ferries had adopted in 2002.

The commencement of Condor car carrying services to France from Jersey had an immediate effect on the incumbent operator, Emeraude Lines, with the decision by the States of Jersey seeing Emeraude in financial difficulties by October 2003. Emeraude would go on to file for protection from bankruptcy in France with debts of €4,000,000, be purchased by the Sogestran Group, and finally collapse in 2005 after a price war with Condor.

In 2004, the Commodore Group operations were rebranded, with Commodore Ferries coming under the Condor Ferries name and Commodore Express becoming Condor Logistics. The group was sold once again in 2004 to the Royal Bank of Scotland's venture capital arm for £240 million.

In August 2005, Condor Express briefly ran on the Poole – Cherbourg service. The Condor Express had been experiencing technical problems, and so the Condor Vitesse was transferred to the more taxing Channel Islands service. Condor Express also operated the Poole-Cherbourg route in 2008.

=== Acquisition by the Macquarie Group and closure of Condor Logistics ===
In 2008, the Macquarie European Infrastructure Fund II acquired the Condor Group. The deal was worth a reported €390 million and saw Condor join Isle of Man Steam Packet Company and Wightlink under common ownership of Macquarie.

By 2010 the company had started to cut costs by replacing French and British on-board staff with those from Eastern Europe.

Services from Weymouth were temporarily suspended in February 2012 after large cracks appeared in their berth at the port.

It was announced on 4 October 2012 that Condor Logistics would close its operations with the loss of about 180 jobs (110 in the UK, 50 in Jersey and 20 in Guernsey). The move was blamed on changes to low-value consignment relief affecting the Channel Islands.

In December of 2012, Condor had its operational permit to run Channel Island services extended until 2019. Shortly afterwards, Condor began to seek a suitable replacement for both Condor Express and Condor Vitesse. The reconstruction works to the berth at Weymouth were completed, and Condor returned in July 2013 after a hiatus of 18 months. The reported cost of the temporary switch to Poole was £1 million in extra fuel costs, to cover the extra thirty minutes sailing time.

It was decided by Brittany Ferries in 2013 not to renew the joint Poole-Cherbourg service.

=== Purchase and introduction of Condor Liberation ===
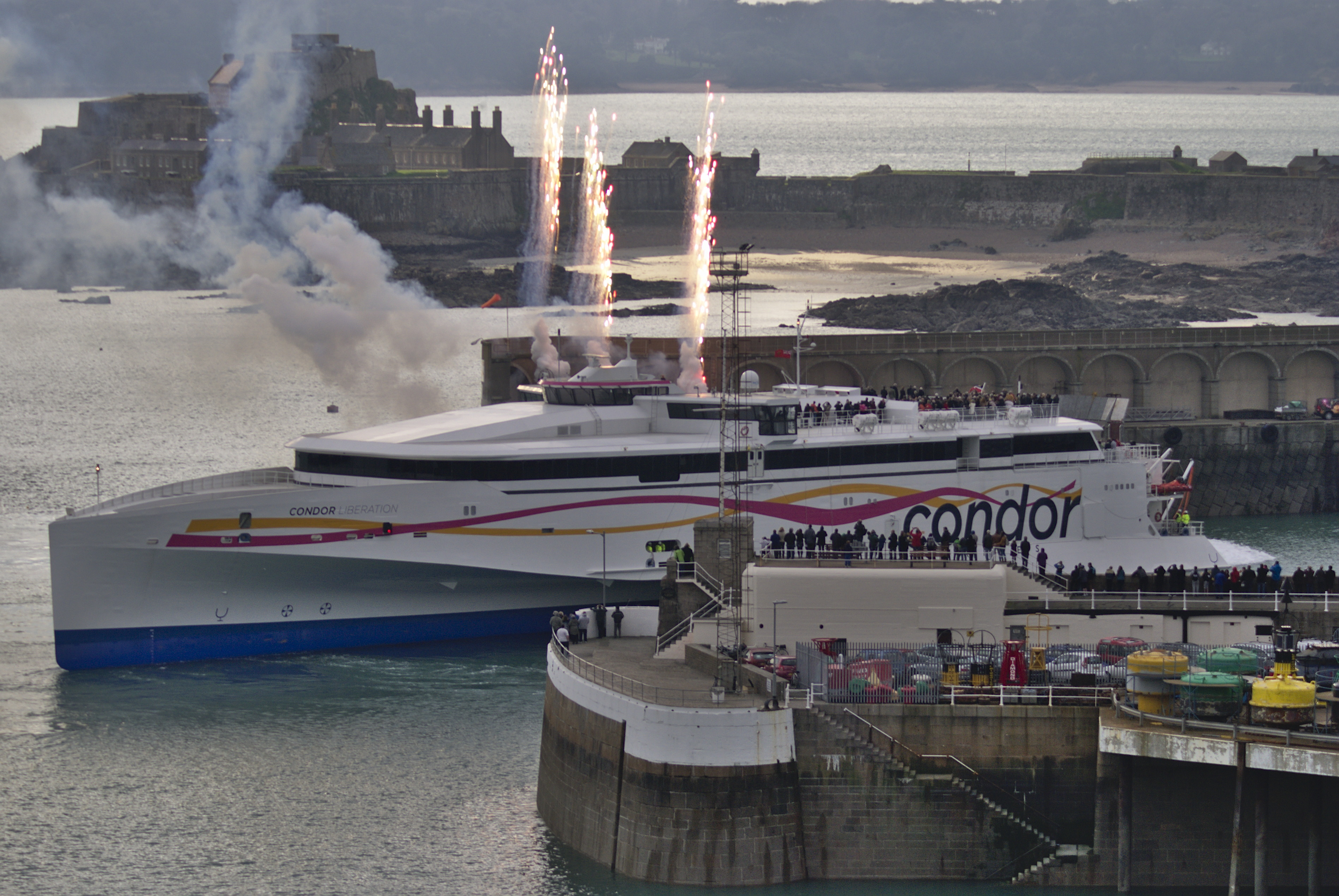
Condor Liberation on her maiden arrival into Jersey in 2015

By 2014 the firm found that Condor Express and Condor Vitesse were reaching the end of their operational lives, but there was a reluctance to purchase new tonnage without security of service. Thus a protracted process was undertaken to agree a new ten-year operating license to the Channel Islands, which was finally agreed on 31 July 2014, running until 2024.

It was announced in 2015 that both Condor Express and Condor Vitesse were to be sold and replaced by the much larger Condor Liberation, then known as Condor 102. This would ultimately result the cessation of services from Weymouth as a larger berth was required, and the further reconstruction, estimated at £10 million was unsuccessful at attracting government funding despite pleas by Weymouth and Portland Borough Council and South Dorset MP Richard Drax. After being modified at Austal's Philippines yard, Condor Liberation entered service with Condor Ferries on 27 March 2015 operating from Poole.

On 28 March 2015, the ship struck the quayside while attempting to dock in Guernsey on its second day in service, although damage was minor. Since then, Condor Liberation had a difficult period of operation with Condor Ferries, continuing into 2016, encountering numerous technical problems, weather cancellations and sustaining further damage to its hull whilst docked in Poole during Storm Frank in December 2015.

=== Sale to Columbia Threadneedle Investments and Brittany Ferries ===
In June 2019, the UK-based financial website This is Money reported that Macquarie Group was looking to wind down Condor's then-owner, the Macquarie European Infrastructure Fund 2. Rumours had surfaced for a few years beforehand when Deputy Peter Febrache, formerly the President of Guernsey's Committee for Economic Development, said in a Scrutiny hearing that the company was on the market.

It was announced on 14 November 2019 that the European Sustainable Infrastructure Fund managed by Columbia Threadneedle Investments had purchased Condor, forming a consortium with Brittany Ferries, which also bought a minority stake in the company.

Between 2022 and 2023, Condor operated summer fast-ferry services between Poole, Portsmouth, and Cherbourg for Brittany Ferries using the Condor Liberation.

=== Joint purchase of Condor Islander with the States of Guernsey ===
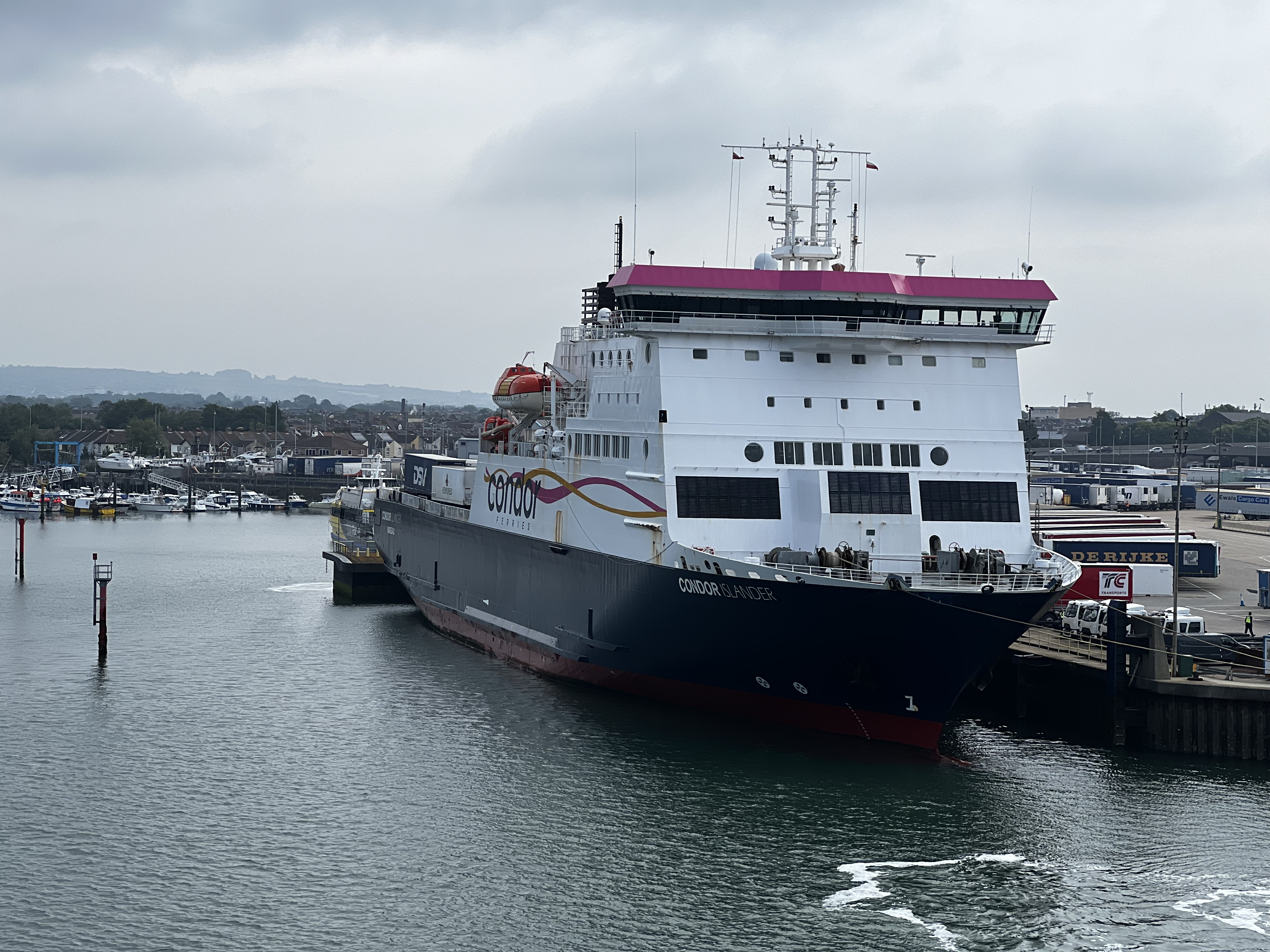
Condor Islander in 2024

In September 2022, it was revealed that plans developed by the States of Guernsey to directly purchase another conventional vessel for Condor Ferries earlier in the year were called off. Instead, an investment board began to look into whether or not a vessel could be owned by an investment fund.

In April 2023, the States of Guernsey loaned Condor Ferries £26 million in a joint venture to purchase the Straitsman, which was operating across the Cook Strait at the time. Renamed Condor Islander, the purchase of the vessel to operate between Portsmouth and the Channel Islands was deemed "essential" by the Civil Contingencies Authority of Guernsey.

The purchase of the Condor Islander was questioned by Deputy Gavin St Pier to Deputy Peter Febrache after a Guernsey Press interview with Condor CEO John Napton revealed that Condor had other funding options for the ship, with Napton also detailing his confusion to why the States had invoked emergency powers to complete the deal, and why the States were keen on helping to buy a ferry after discussing his desire to improve resilience in the Condor fleet. Deputy Febrache revealed that he "thought the decision of the States to allow Condor to reduce its fleet from five vessels to four was a mistake" and "had the States of Guernsey not become involved in the funding, the vessel would not have been secured" due to time constraints.

Condor Islander's entry to service in October 2023 was marred by weather disruption caused by Storm Babet and technical difficulties not long after.

=== Financial issues, ferry tender and Brittany Ferries' take-over ===
In December 2023, Condor Ferries announced it was facing financial issues and would increase freight charges by nearly 19% from January 2024. The States of Guernsey and the Government of Jersey began forming contingency plans, which included the trial of DFDS Seaways' Finlandia Seaways in both islands.

In March 2024, Christophe Mathieu, CEO of Brittany Ferries, who had recently become CEO of Condor Ferries, announced that Brittany Ferries had loaned Condor £10 million to cover unpaid port fees, and that he believed the low usage of Condor Islander had led to the financial issues experienced by the company.

A joint ferry tender process between Guernsey and Jersey began on 14 May 2024. Applicants included Condor Ferries, DFDS, and Irish Ferries. In June 2024, it was revealed that Stena Line had also applied, but chose to withdraw from the process.

In August 2024, it was announced that Brittany Ferries was set to become the majority owner of Condor Ferries, pending the approval of regulators in Guernsey and Jersey. The proposed deal would see Brittany increase their stake from 29% to 51% with Columbia Threadneedle European Sustainable Infrastructure Fund retaining a minority shareholding.

After many months, both islands could not reach a shared agreement. On 31 October 2024, Guernsey chose to appoint Brittany Ferries as its preferred company to operate a 15-year service contract. Jersey announced on 3 December 2024 that it had selected DFDS as its preferred operator for the next 15 years from spring 2025, ending Condor's 60 years of lifeline operations in Jersey.

On 28 March 2025, the Guernsey-only operation was taken over by Brittany Ferries, using the Condor Islander and Condor Voyager, and the Commodore Clipper as a back-up vessel. This marked the end of the 60-year history of the Condor Ferries brand.

On 7 April 2025, Brittany Ferries became the sole owner of Condor.

== Routes ==
=== Hydrofoils ===
- Saint-Malo–Jersey–Guernsey: 1964–1994
- Cherbourg–Jersey–Guernsey: 1964
- Granville–Jersey–Guernsey: 1964
- Poole–Guernsey–Jersey: September 1986
- Saint-Malo–Jersey–Guernsey–Weymouth: 1987–1990

=== High-speed passenger craft ===
- Saint-Malo–Jersey–Guernsey: 1994–2001
- Torquay–Guernsey: 1995

=== Ro-ro and High-speed vehicle craft ===
- Weymouth–Guernsey–Jersey: 1993–1997, 1998–2012, 2013–2015
- Poole–Guernsey–Jersey: 1997–2025
- Saint-Malo–Jersey–Guernsey: 2002–2025
- Portsmouth–Guernsey–Jersey: 2004–2025
- Cherbourg–Guernsey: 2022–2024

== Fleet ==
Ship	Built	In service	Tonnage	History
Condor 1	1964 (Cantieri Navali L. Rodriguez, Messina, Italy)	1964-1976	127 GT	Scrapped in Italy in 2004
Condor 2	1965 (Cantieri Navali L. Rodriguez, Messina, Italy)	1969-1970, 1981	127 GT	Scrapped in Italy in 2003
Condor 3	1971 (Cantieri Navali L. Rodriguez, Messina, Italy)	1971-1980	129 GT	Sank in Colonia del Sacramento in 1987 (Note: Some sources say 1990), scrapped in 2001
Condor 4	1974 (Cantiere Navaltecnia, Messina, Italy)	1974-1990	129 GT	Last known to be operating as Iptamenos Hermes 1 with Hermes Ferries Shipping
Condor 5	1976 (Cantiere Navaltecnia, Messina, Italy	1976-1992	174 GT	Scrapped in Perama in 2004
Condor 6	1980 (Westermoen Hydrofoil, Mandal, Norway)	1980	322 GT	Last known to be operating as Jet Cruise 1 with Fast Ferries
Condor 7	1985 (Cantieri Navali L. Rodriguez, Messina, Italy)	1985-1993	208 GT	Scrapped in 2009
Condor 8	1988 (Fairey Marinteknik, Singapore)	1988-1997	387 GRT	Now SNAV Aries with SNAV
Condor 9	1990 (Aluminium Shipbuilders Ltd., Fareham, England)	1990-2002	752 GRT	Now Jessica W with Block Island Express.
Condor 10	1993 (Incat, Tasmania, Australia)	1993-1994, 2002-2010	3,240 GT	Now Tiger with Tiger Shipping Co
Havelet	1977 (Trondhjems mekaniske Værksted, Trondheim, Norway)	1994-2000	6,918 GT	Scrapped at Aliağa Ship Breaking Yard in 2013
Condor 11	1995 (Incat, Tasmania, Australia)	1995	3,989 GT	Now Fares 2 with Maritime Company for Navigation (MACNA)
Condor France	1993 (Fairey Marinteknik, Singapore, completed by Marineteknik Verkstads, Öregrund, Sweden)	1996-1999	585 GT	Now Lovely I with Lovely Fast Ferries
Condor 12	1996 (Incat, Tasmania, Australia)	1996-1997	4,112 GT	Now Jaume II with Baleària Caribbean
Condor Express	1996 (Incat, Tasmania, Australia)	1996-2015	5,005 GT	Now Champion Jet 2 with Seajets
Condor Vitesse	1997 (Incat, Tasmania, Australia)	1997-2015	5,007 GT	Now Champion Jet 1 with Seajets
Commodore Clipper	1999 (Van der Giessen de Noord, Netherlands)	2004 (Note: Entered service for Commodore Shipping in 1999)-2025	13,460 GT	Now with Brittany Ferries
Commodore Goodwill	1996 (Royal Schelde Group, Vlissingen, Netherlands)	2004 (Note: Entered service for Commodore Shipping in 1996)-2025	11,166 GT	Now Caesarea Trader with DFDS Seaways
Arrow	1998 (Astilleros de Huelva, Huelva, Spain)	2005-2006; 2010, 2013, 2014	7,606 GT	Chartered
Condor Rapide	1997 (Incat, Tasmania, Australia)	2010-2021	5,007 GT	Now Champion Jet 3 with Seajets
Condor Liberation	2010 (Austal, Henderson, Western Australia	2015-2025	6,307 GRT	Now Pepita Castellví with Baleària
Condor Voyager	2000 (Incat Tasmania, Tasmania, Australia)	2021-2025	6,581 GT	Now Voyager with Brittany Ferries
Condor Islander	2005 (Royal Bodewes Scheepwerf Volharding, Foxhol, Netherlands)	2023-2025	13,906 GT	Now Islander with Brittany Ferries

== Accidents and incidents ==
Since its founding in 1964, Condor Ferries have been involved in numerous accidents, with some becoming high-profile.

=== Condor 11 grounding ===
On 9 October 1994 Condor 11 was on sea trials off Tasmania and travelling at 36 knots under the command of Incat managing director Robert Clifford when she struck Black Jack Reef some 12 miles off Hobart.

=== Incidents with HD Ferries ===
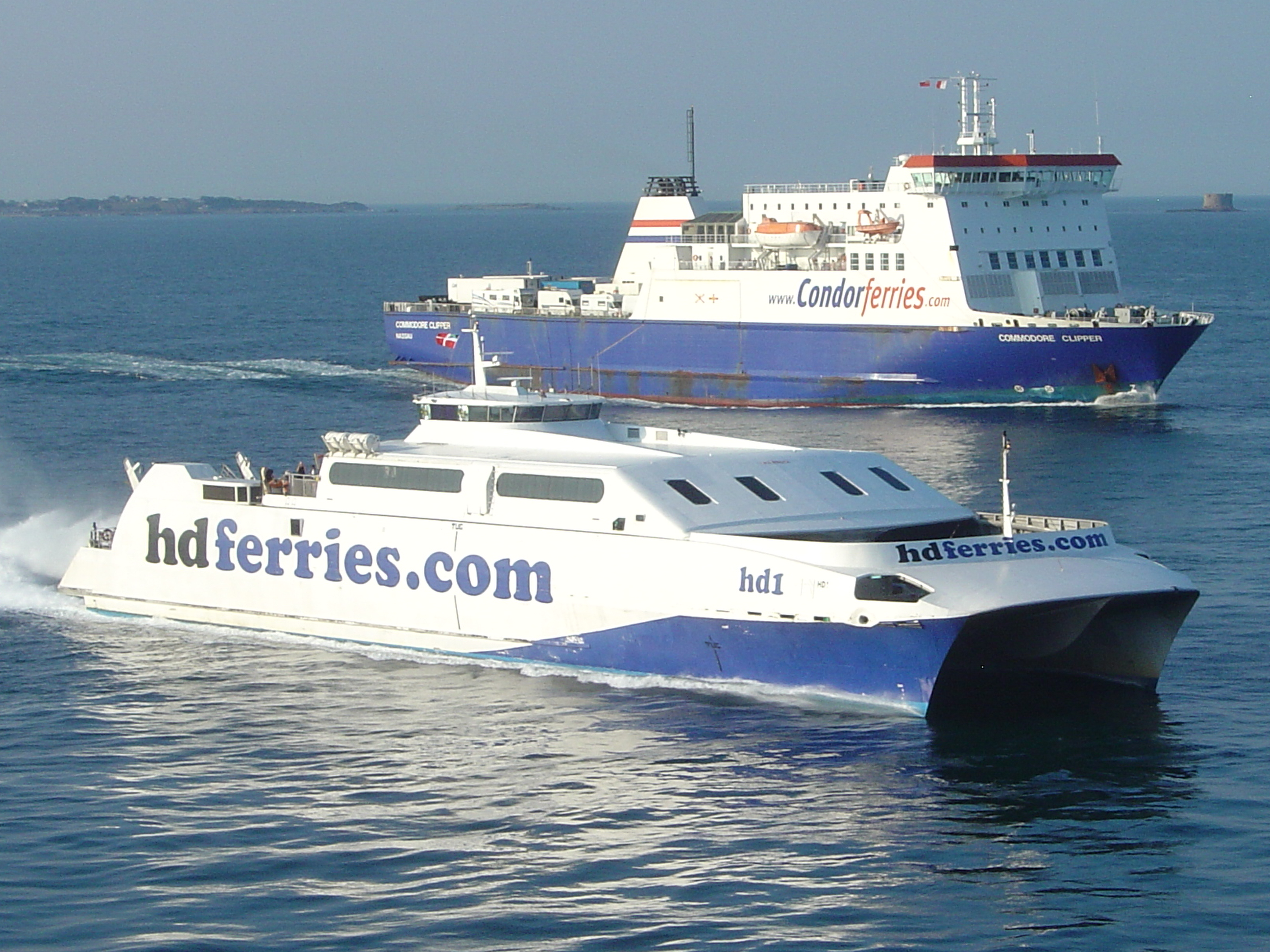
HD1 passing the Commodore Clipper

On 11 May 2007 HD Ferries' ship HD1 had collided with the Commodore Goodwill in Jersey Harbour.

A more serious incident occurred on 28 July 2007 when HD1, while manoeuvring in Jersey Harbour, collided with Condor Express which was berthed at the time. HD1 was holed above the waterline while Condor Express suffered only minor damage to its paintwork.

Condor issued a press release on 3 August 2007 condemning HD Ferries, which HD responded to with its own press release. HD1 later had its wave height limit reduced from 2.5 metres to 2m (Condor being able to operate its larger fastcraft in seas up to 3.5 metres), and on 19 August 2007 the HD Ferries ramp permit for Jersey and Guernsey was withdrawn, preventing the company from operating. It recommenced operations on 25 August 2007.

In a press release issued on 2 October 2007, HD Ferries stated that it was preparing to take legal action against Condor concerning the statement published by the company on 3 August 2007, but this was not done.

Following HD Ferries' decision to withdraw its service early in September 2008 and not operate a winter service, the States of Jersey indicated that HD Ferries was unlikely to be allowed a ramp licence again.

=== Commodore Goodwill collision with harbour wall ===
On 10 December 2007, bad weather caused the Commodore Goodwill to strike the entrance to La Collette yacht basin in St Helier harbour. One of the vessel's propellers was damaged and the ship was sent to Falmouth for the damaged part to be removed to return the ship to service as soon as possible in the run-up to Christmas. On 13 December 2007, the Brittany Ferries freight vessel Coutances was chartered to temporarily take the Commodore Goodwill's place.

=== Commodore Clipper Fire 2010 ===
A fire broke out on the Commodore Clipper's lower vehicle deck in the early hours of 16 June 2010 whilst it was travelling from Jersey to Portsmouth. The fire was the result of an electrical fault in a freight truck loaded with potatoes. Combining factors including potatoes from the damaged freight truck blocking onboard drains, preventing water from the drench system from draining, resulted in the ferry listing to its port side for an extended period of time. 62 passengers were stranded on board the ferry for around 20 hours. Eventually, all passengers safely disembarked the ferry once it arrived in Portsmouth, with the truck pulled out of the ferry and the fire was shortly put out. Significant damage was done to the truck and other freight trailers, as well as heat damage to a small area of the lower vehicle deck and also the failure of some onboard systems.

=== Condor Vitesse collision with a French fishing boat ===
At approximately 0645 UTC on 28 March 2011 the Condor Vitesse was in collision with a Granville fishing boat, the 9.3m Les Marquises, in the vicinity of the Minquiers reef south of Jersey while en route from Saint-Malo in foggy conditions. Two of the French fishermen were rescued from the water by the ferry's safety boats. The skipper of Les Marquises, 42-year-old Philippe Claude Lesaulnier, was rescued by another fishing boat Joker and transferred to Jersey's lifeboat, but died later the same day in Jersey's hospital. An inquest in Jersey revealed that Lesaulnier died of crush injuries to the upper abdomen, and drowning. He was married with four children.

An investigation began. The French investigator, Renauld Gaudeul, procureur de la République de Coutances said that the speed of the ferry would be of key importance to the investigation. On 19 October 2011, the BEAmer released its report. In summary, "Condor Vitesse sailed from Saint-Malo in thick fog conditions; the fog horn had been inactivated very early and the visual lookout had not been strengthened. The speed had progressively reached 37 knots. In the wheelhouse almost continuous talks without any link with the watchkeeping, maintained an atmosphere not compatible with the necessary concentration to conduct a HSC in the fog. This behavior, as well as the visibility are the causal factors of the accident. When Condor Vitesse approached the Minquiers waters, both officers did not detect 2 vessel echoes ahead on starboard, the first was a ship that would be passing at a hundred of meters on starboard, the second was Les Marquises. The potter was fishing, with her radar on, without emitting any sound signals. A hand saw the HSC at the last moment but too late to alert the skipper. The collision cut the fishing vessel in two parts, while on board the HSC there was a leak in the starboard bow compartment. The aft part of the potter kept afloat for a time, allowing the two hands to stay on it until they have been rescued by the HSC crew."

On 11 September 2013 the court in Coutances found the Vitesse captain Paul Le Romancer and first officer Yves Tournon (both of whom no longer work for Condor) guilty of manslaughter, involuntary injury and failure to respect maritime regulations. Tournon was later exonerated by the Caen appeal court, which quashed his conviction.

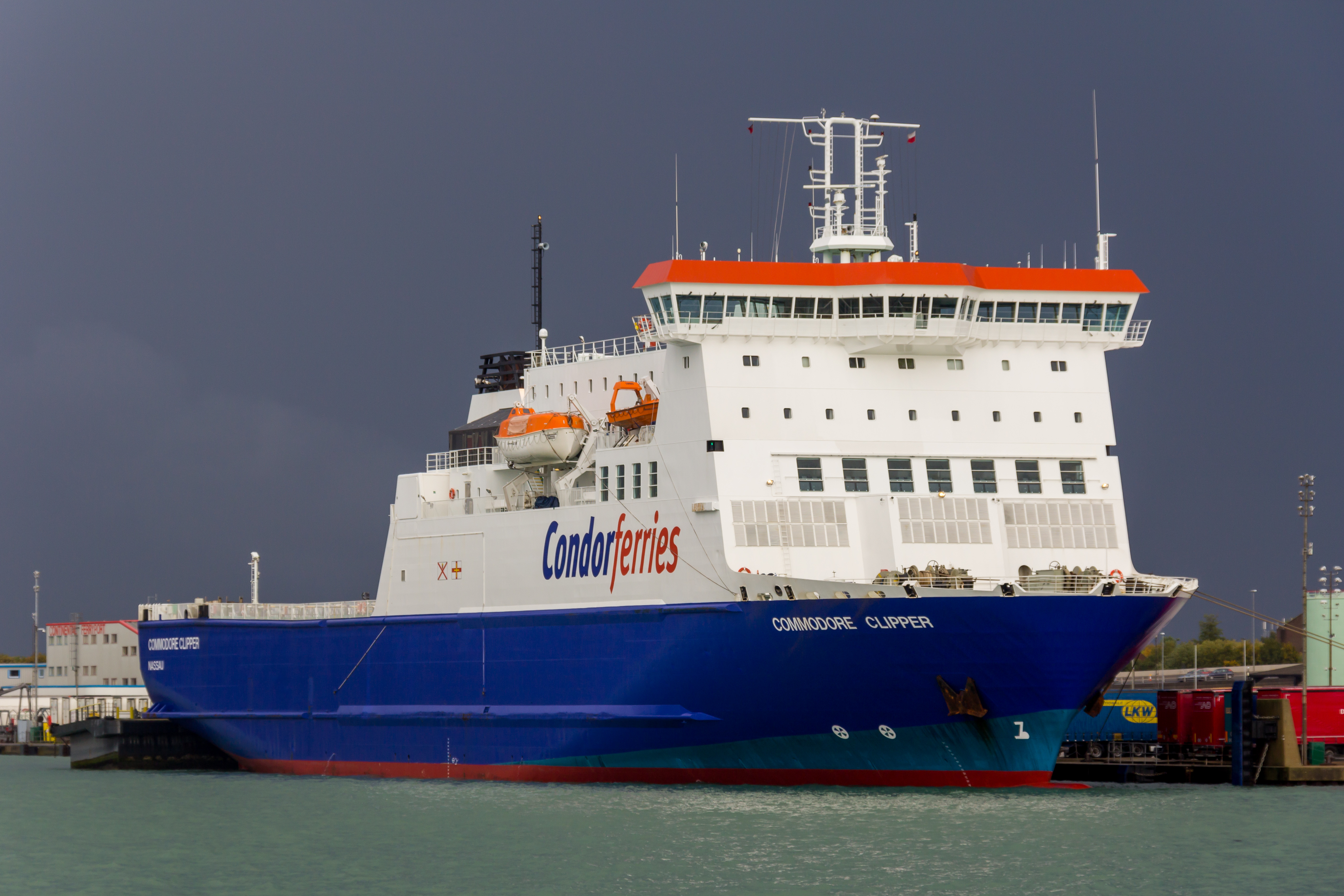
Commodore Clipper in 2013

=== Commodore Clipper grounding ===
On 14 July 2014, Commodore Clipper accidentally grounded off Guernsey. The key findings of an investigation by Marine Accident Investigation Branch were:

- There had not been enough planning for the trip – in part because the repetitive nature of the schedule had led to "complacency".
- The crew refused to acknowledge that the ship might have grounded, partly because the alarms that could have told them it had been disabled
- Insufficient passage planning meant that the bridge team headed into danger without appreciation of the navigational risk. The planning issues not properly considered were: the very low tide, the effect of the ship 'squatting' in shallow water at high speed and the accuracy of the chart data.
- The possibility that the vessel had grounded was denied. In the circumstances of a shuddering vibration, it is important that the crew establish the state of their vessel by searching for damage.
- The repetitive nature of ferry operations can induce a degree of complacency when planning.
- The electronic navigation system was not being utilised effectively because safety settings were not appropriate to the local conditions, warnings were ignored and the audible alarm was disabled.
- As the responsible authority, Guernsey Harbours did not have an effective risk assessment or safety management plan for the conduct of navigation in its statutory pilotage area.

Condor Ferries says it entirely accepts the findings of its detailed and thorough report.

=== Condor Liberation berthing collision ===
On 28 March 2015, the day after Condor Liberation entered service, she was blown onto the quayside in Guernsey and had to be taken out of service and returned to Poole for repairs. All passengers had to wait in Guernsey for the Commodore Clipper to arrive to take them to Portsmouth instead of Poole.

=== Commodore Goodwill collision with the L'Ecume II trawler ===
On 8 December 2022, the Commodore Goodwill had departed from Guernsey at 04:41 bound for Jersey when at around 05:30 it collided with the L'Ecume II, an 18-metre (59 ft) fishing trawler. The Jersey registered trawler sank in 40 metres (130 ft) of water, 5.6 kilometres (3.5 miles) west of St. Ouen's bay with three fishermen on board. The skipper of the L'Ecume II Michael Michieli and his two Filipino crewmen Larry Simyunn and Jervis Baligat were searched for, unsuccessfully; by 13 December two bodies had been found and were later brought ashore, with the search continuing. After inspection by divers the Commodore Goodwill was cleared to re-enter service. An investigation was started, with a remotely operated underwater vehicle used to survey the shipwreck. As the Commodore Goodwill is registered in the Bahamas, the Bahamas Maritime Authority is responsible for conducting a safety focused investigation. Plans were made to raise the fishing boat from the seabed to help advance the investigation, however the skipper's body was recovered from the wreck while it was still on the seabed and only part of the wreckage was lifted onto land for investigative purposes. The file from the investigation by the States of Jersey Police, known as Operation Nectar, has been passed to Jersey's Law Officers' Department for review.

== Gallery ==
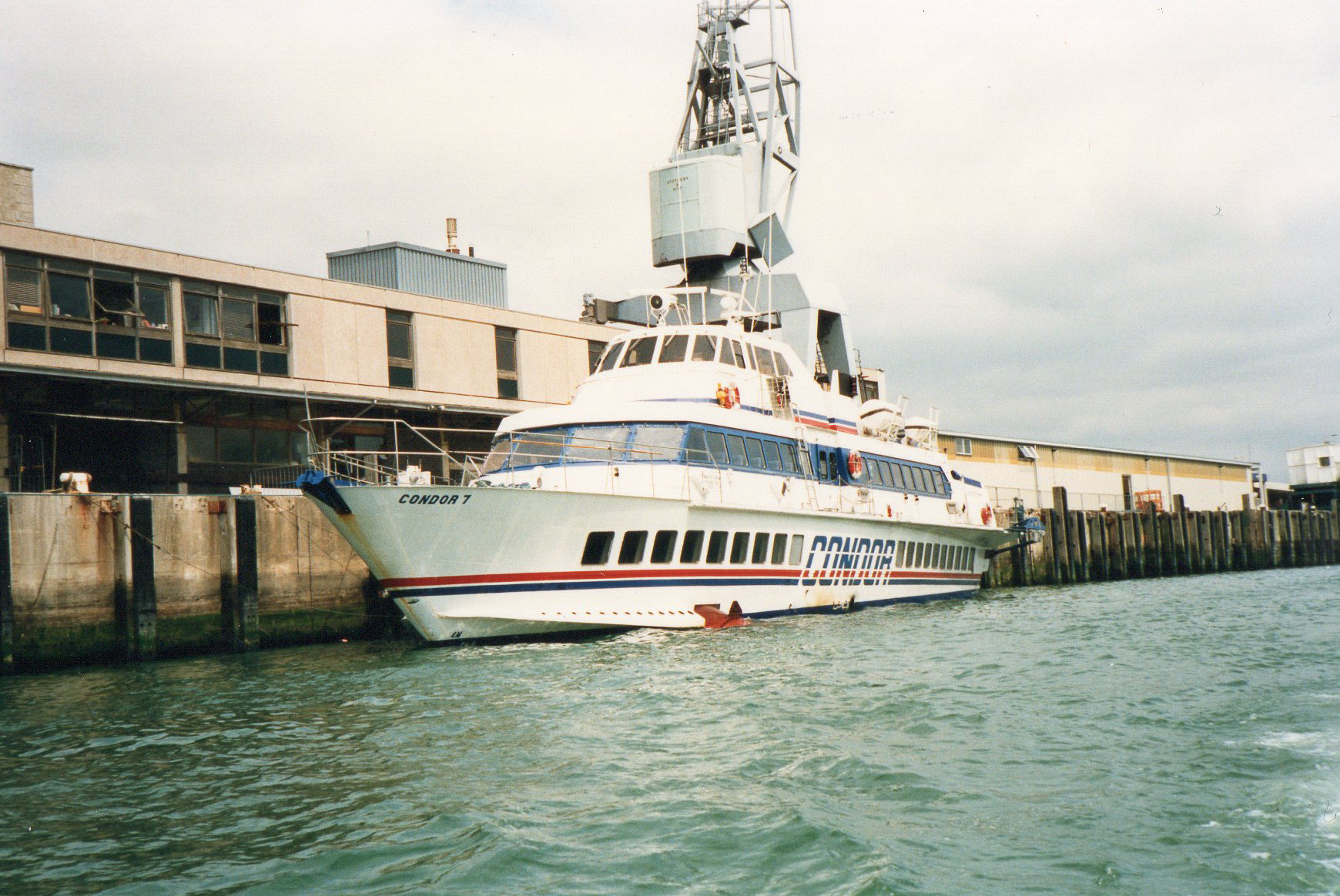
Condor 7 alongside Weymouth, 1987

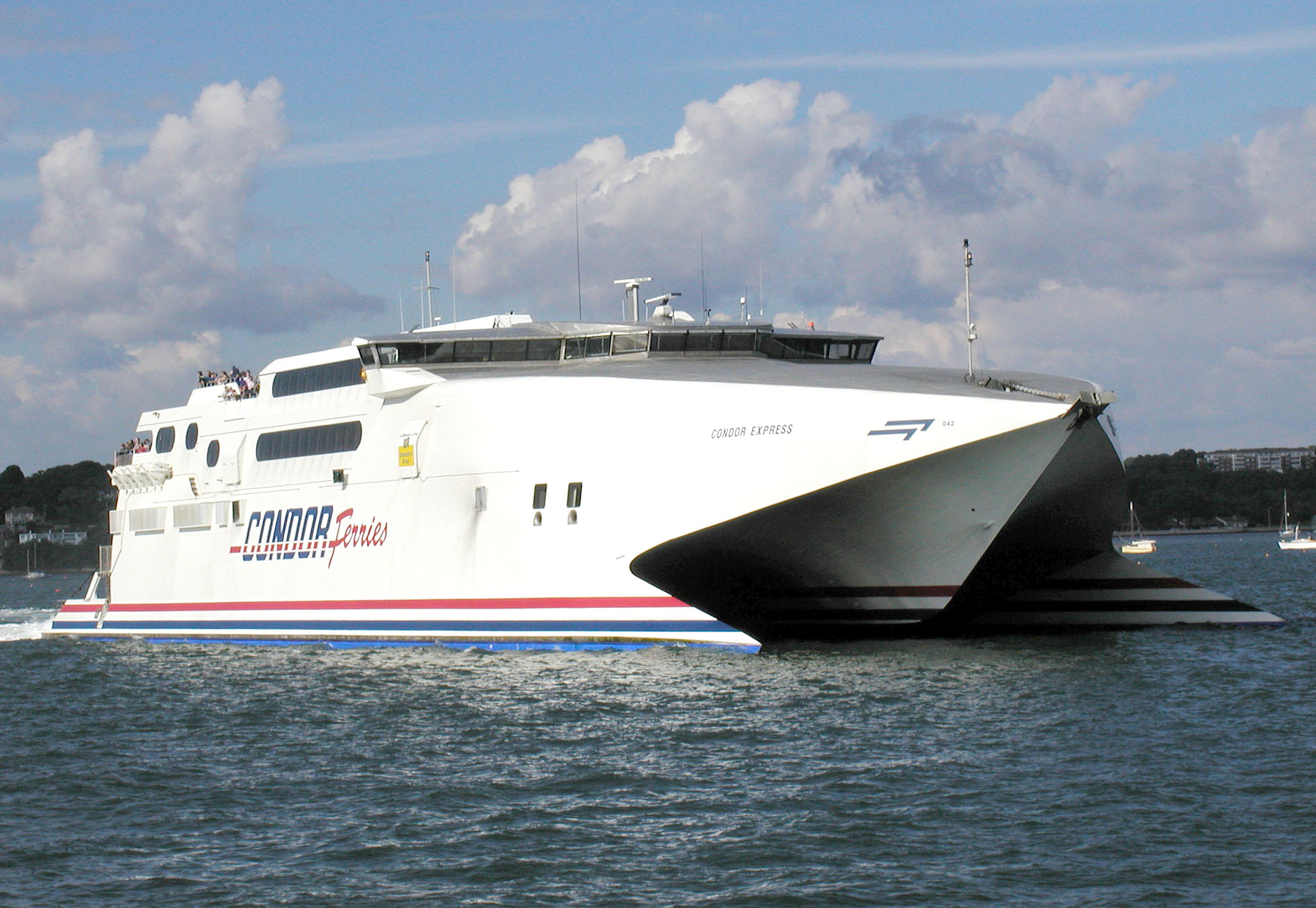
Condor Express passing through Poole Harbour, 2002

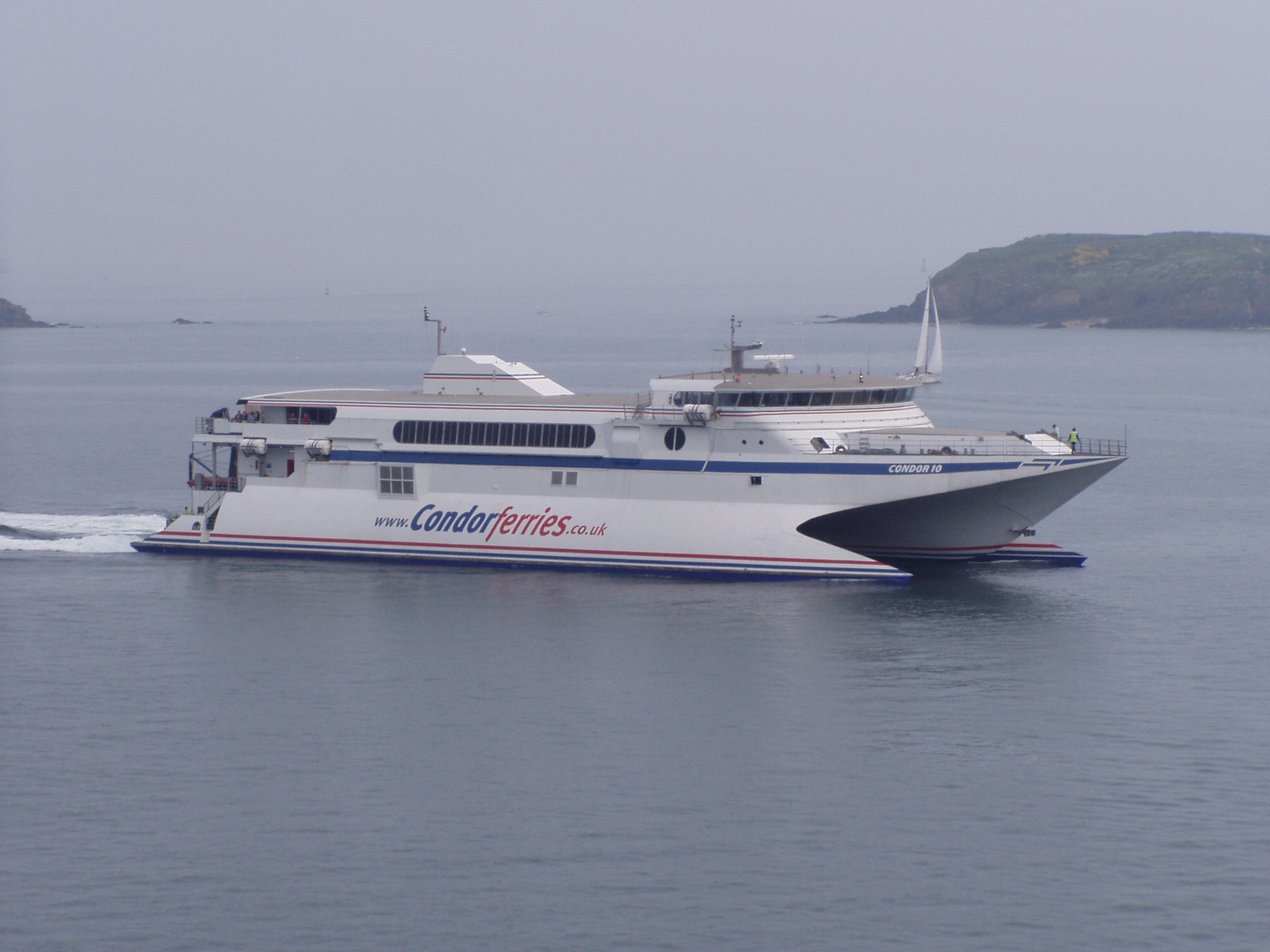
Condor 10 arriving in Saint-Malo, 2003

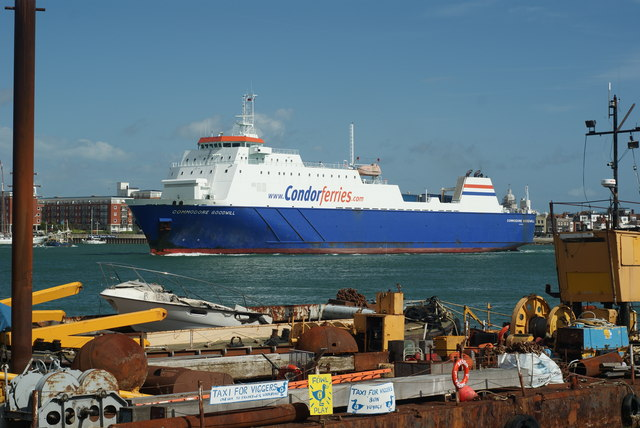
Commodore Goodwill arriving into Portsmouth, 2009

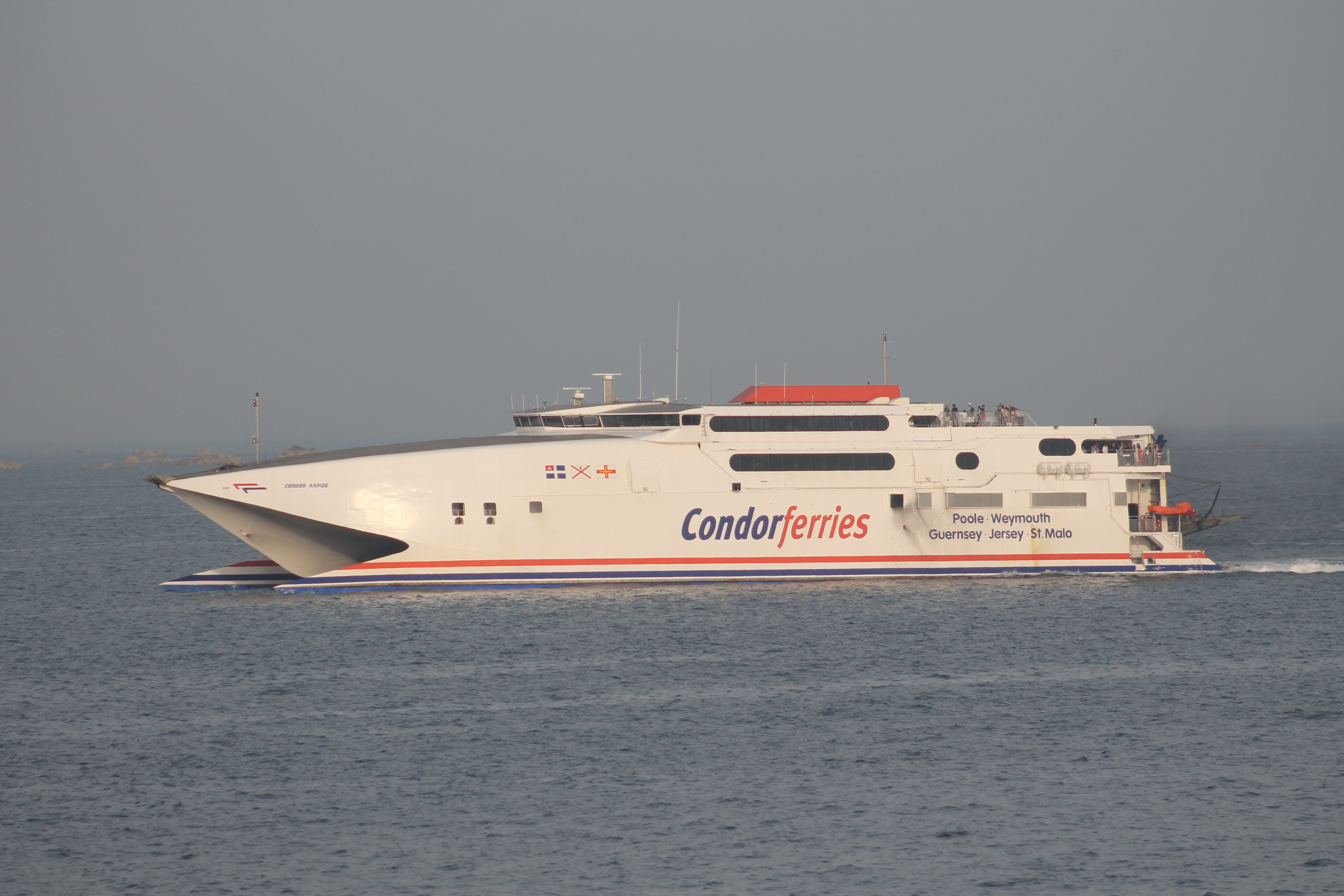
Condor Rapide near Guernsey, 2010

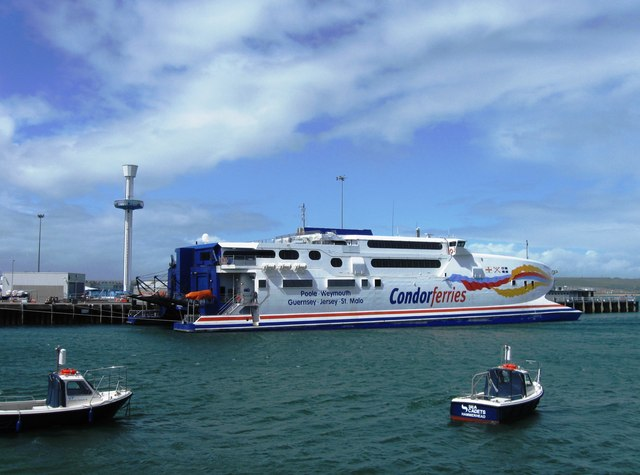
Condor Vitesse alongside Weymouth, 2014

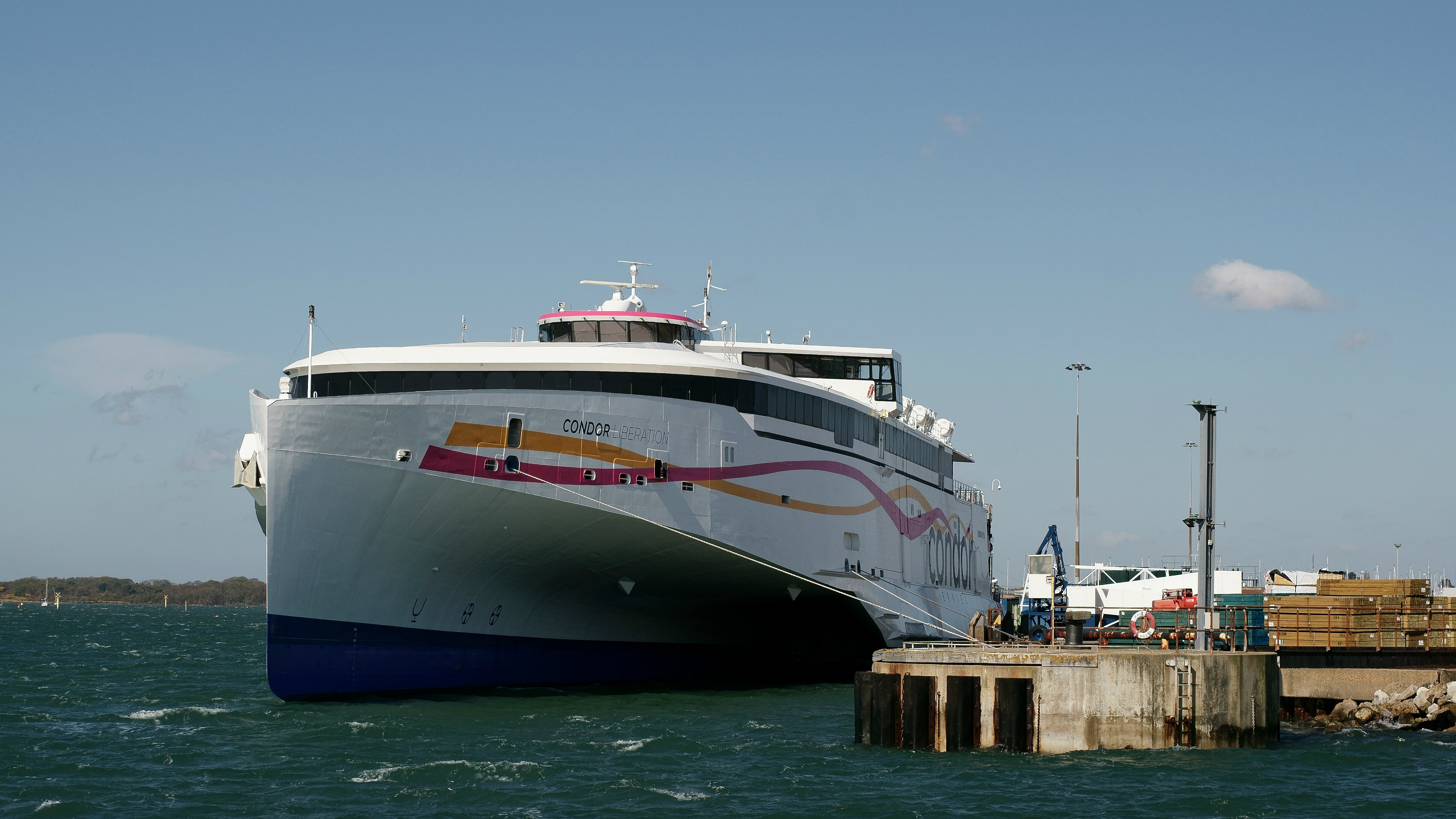
Condor Liberation alongside the Port of Poole, 2015

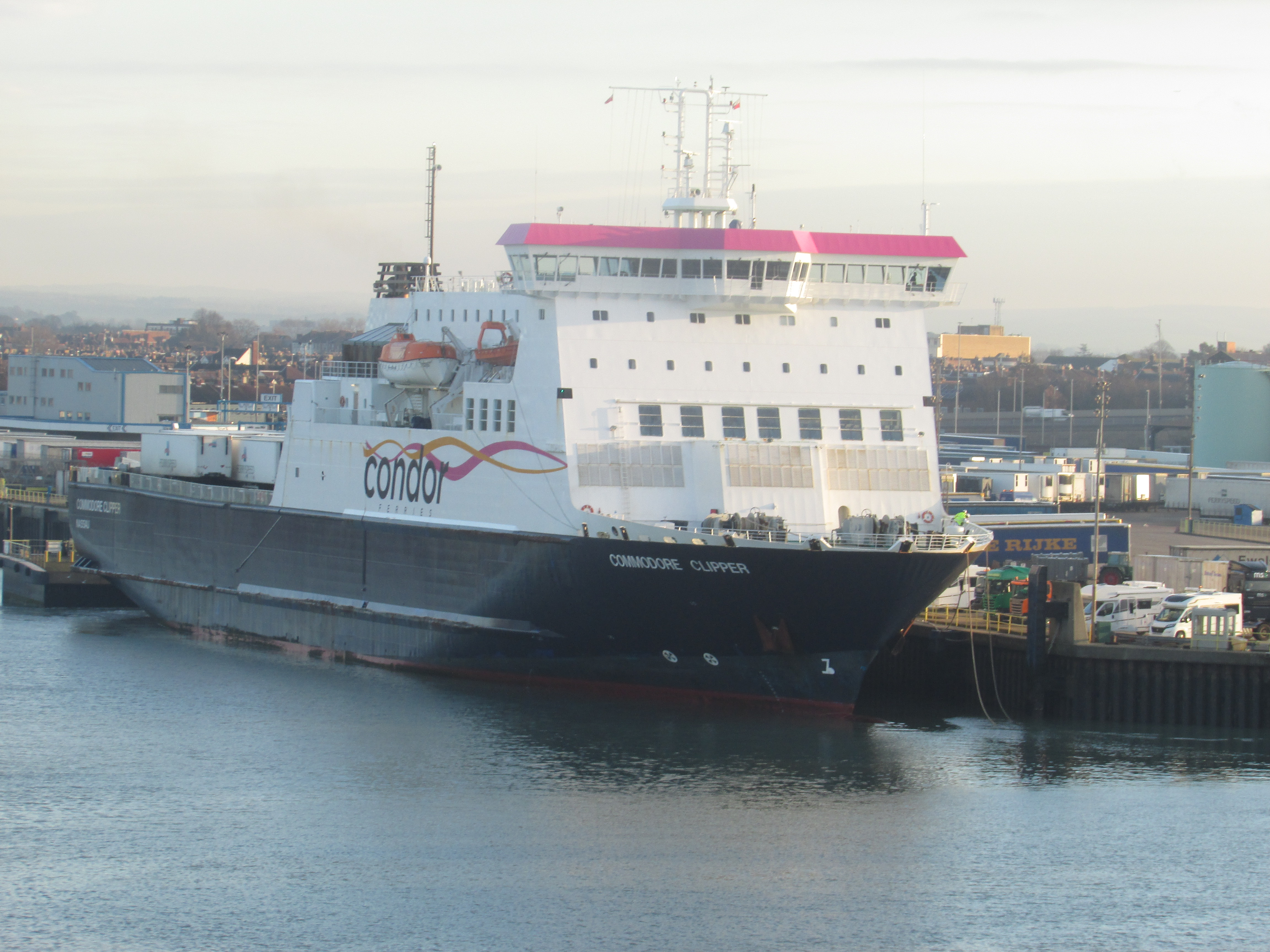
Commodore Clipper alongside Portsmouth International Port, 2016

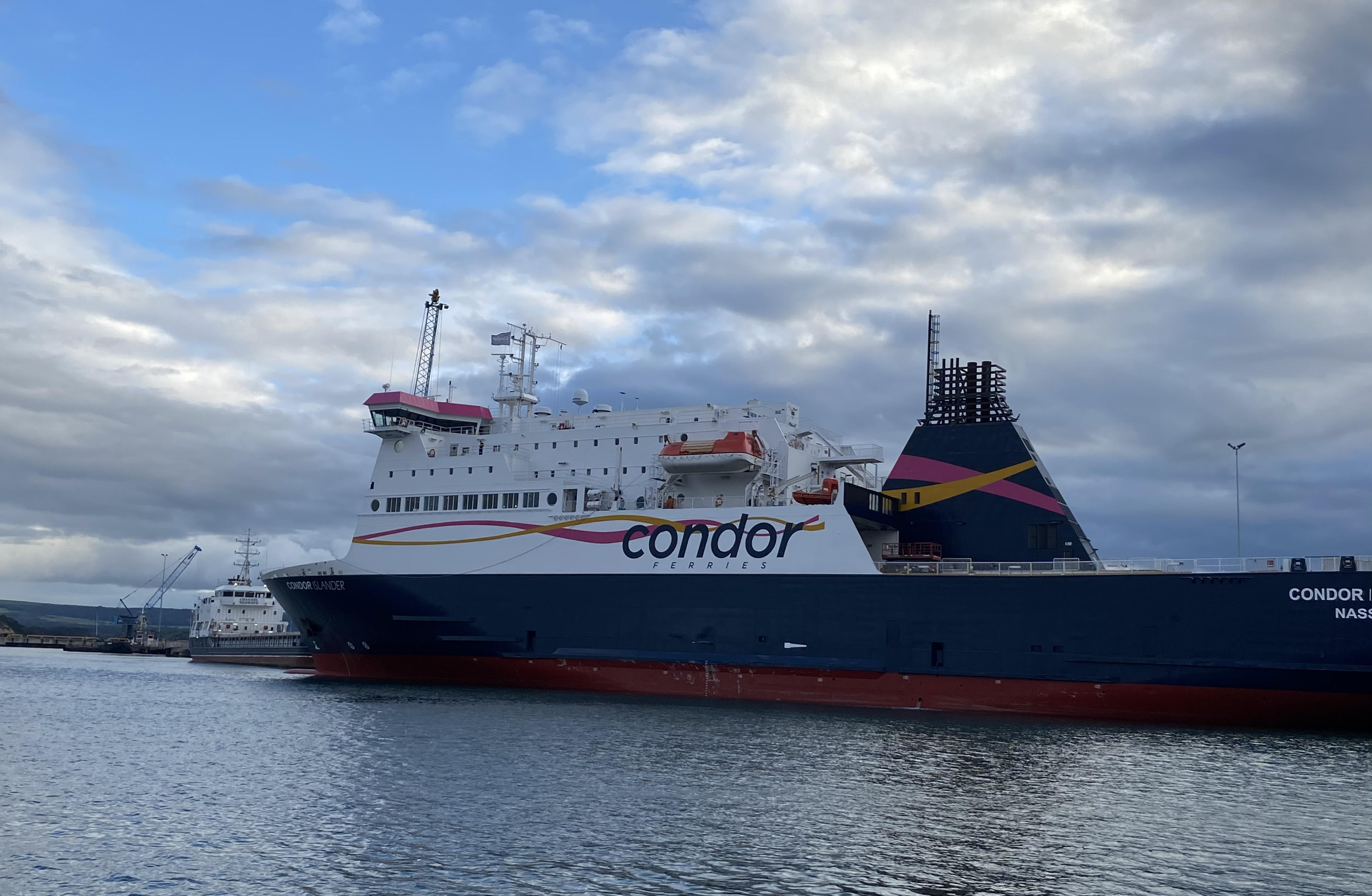
Condor Islander alongside the Port of Poole, 2023

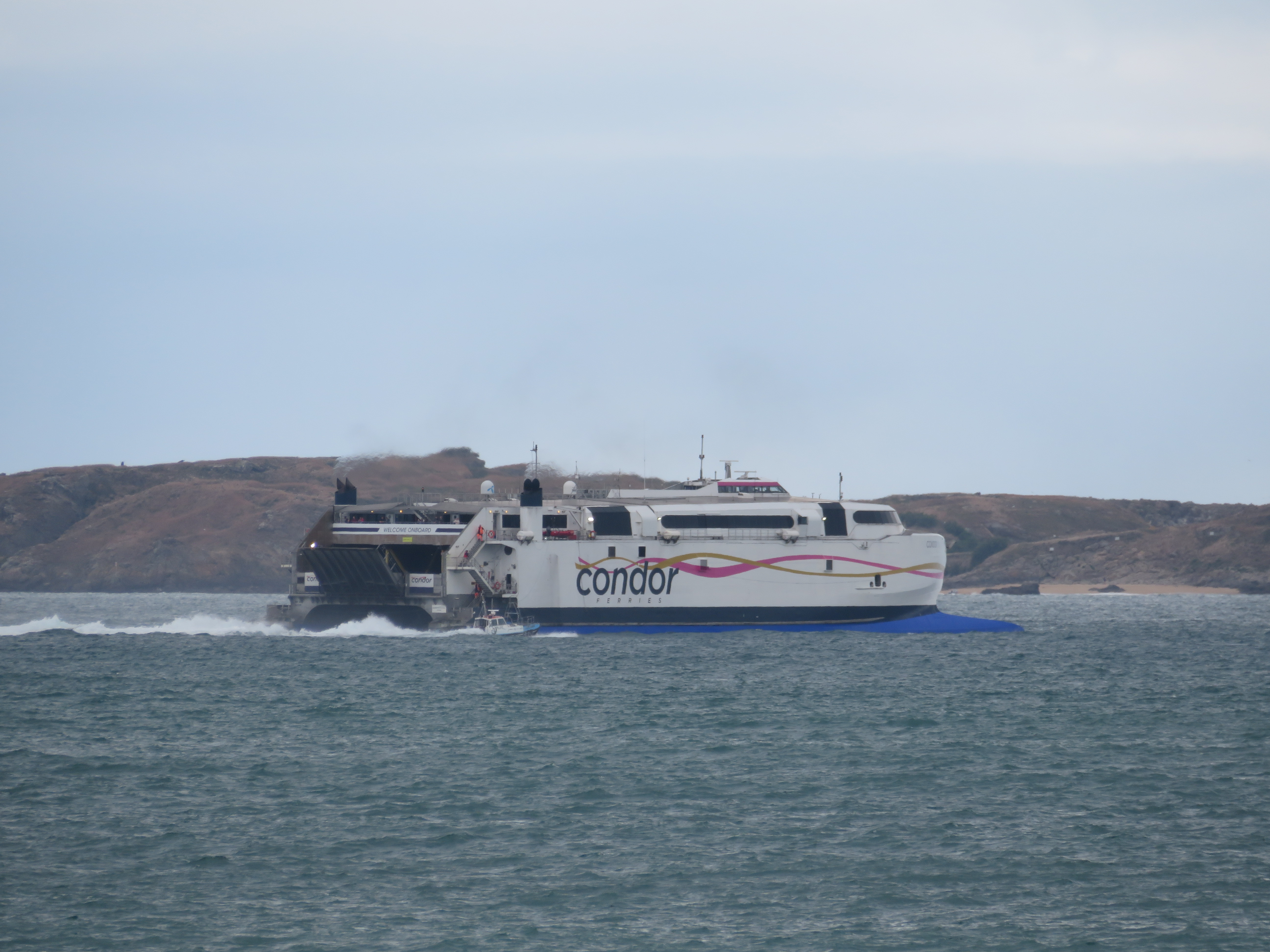
Condor Voyager leaving Saint-Malo, 2024
