= Lovely I =

Passenger ferry

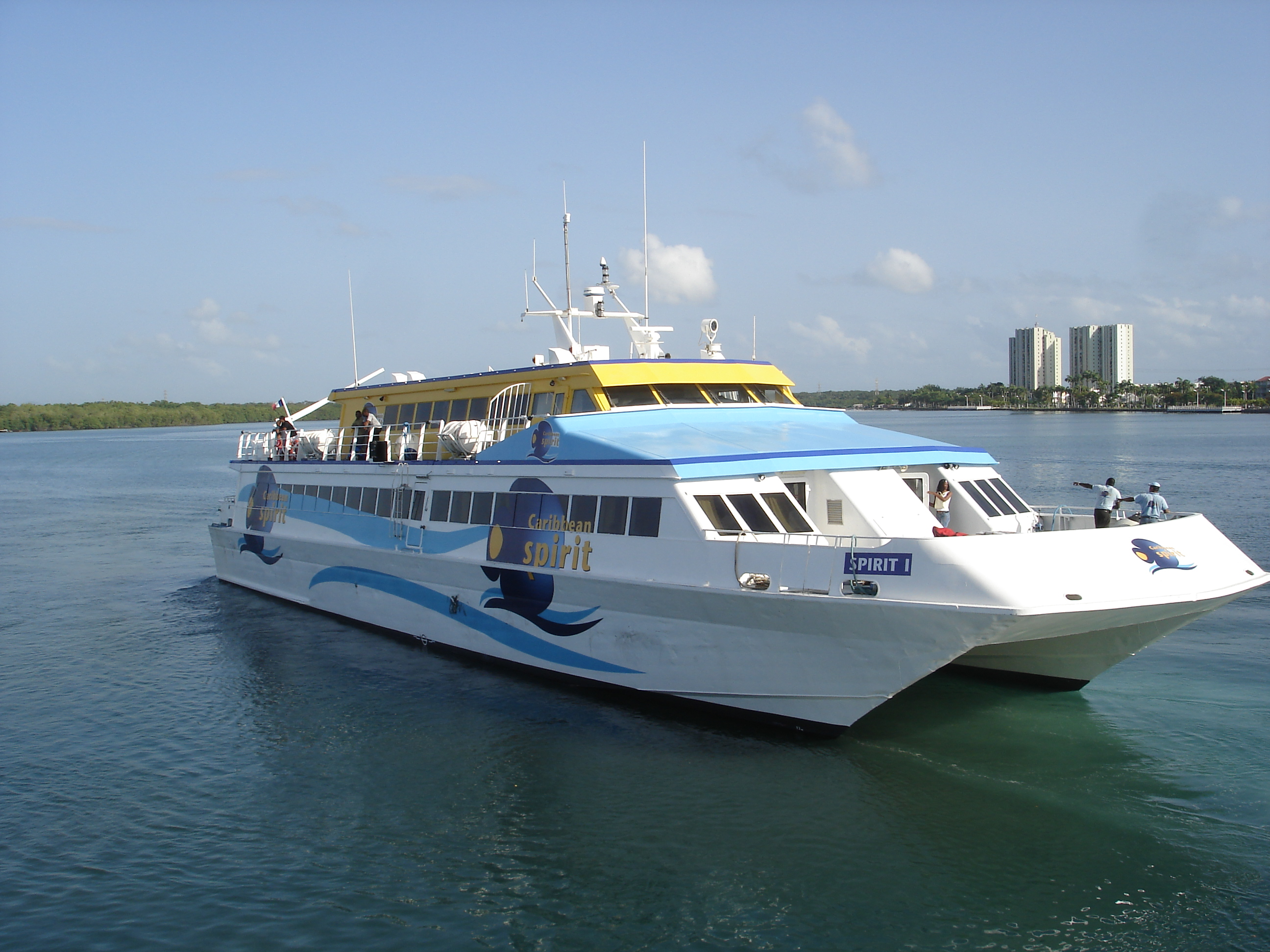
- The ship as Spirit I

History
- Name: 1993–1996: Saint Malo; 1996–1999: Condor France; 1999–2008: Acacia; 2008–2010: Spirit I; 2010–present: Lovely I
- Owner: 1993–1999: Société Nouvelle d'Armement Transmanche (SNAT); 1999–2008: Brudey Freres; 2008–2010: Auto Guadeloupe Investments; 2010–present: Lovely Fast Ferries
- Operator: 1993–1996: Channiland Ferries (SNAT); 1996–1999: Condor Ferries; 1999–2008: Brudey Freres; 2008–2010: Gerant Cie Mme de la Calaibe; 2010–present: Lovely Fast Ferries
- Builder: Fairey Marinteknik, completed by Marineteknik Verkstads
- Identification: IMO number: 9038555

General characteristics
- Tonnage: 585 GT
- Length: 41.57 m (136 ft 5 in)
- Beam: 11 m (36 ft 1 in)
- Draft: 1.3 m (4 ft 3 in)
- Installed power: 2 x MTU 16V396; 3,900 kW (combined)

Lovely I is a catamaran operated by Lovely Fast Ferries. She was built in 1993 by Fairey Marinteknik, Singapore, and completed by Marineteknik Verkstads, Öregrund, Sweden. She first entered services as Saint Malo for Channiland Ferries, and she has also served under the names Condor France, Acacia, and Spirit I.

== Accidents and incidents ==
In April 1995, she was involved in Jersey's biggest maritime disaster, a multi-agency rescue of 307 people when she was holed and starting to sink after hitting an object off La Corbière and starting to take on water, whilst travelling from Jersey to Sark. The passengers were evacuated to life rafts, with around 50 suffering injuries. The vessel was recovered and initially beached in St Aubin's bay, before being refitted and returned to service.

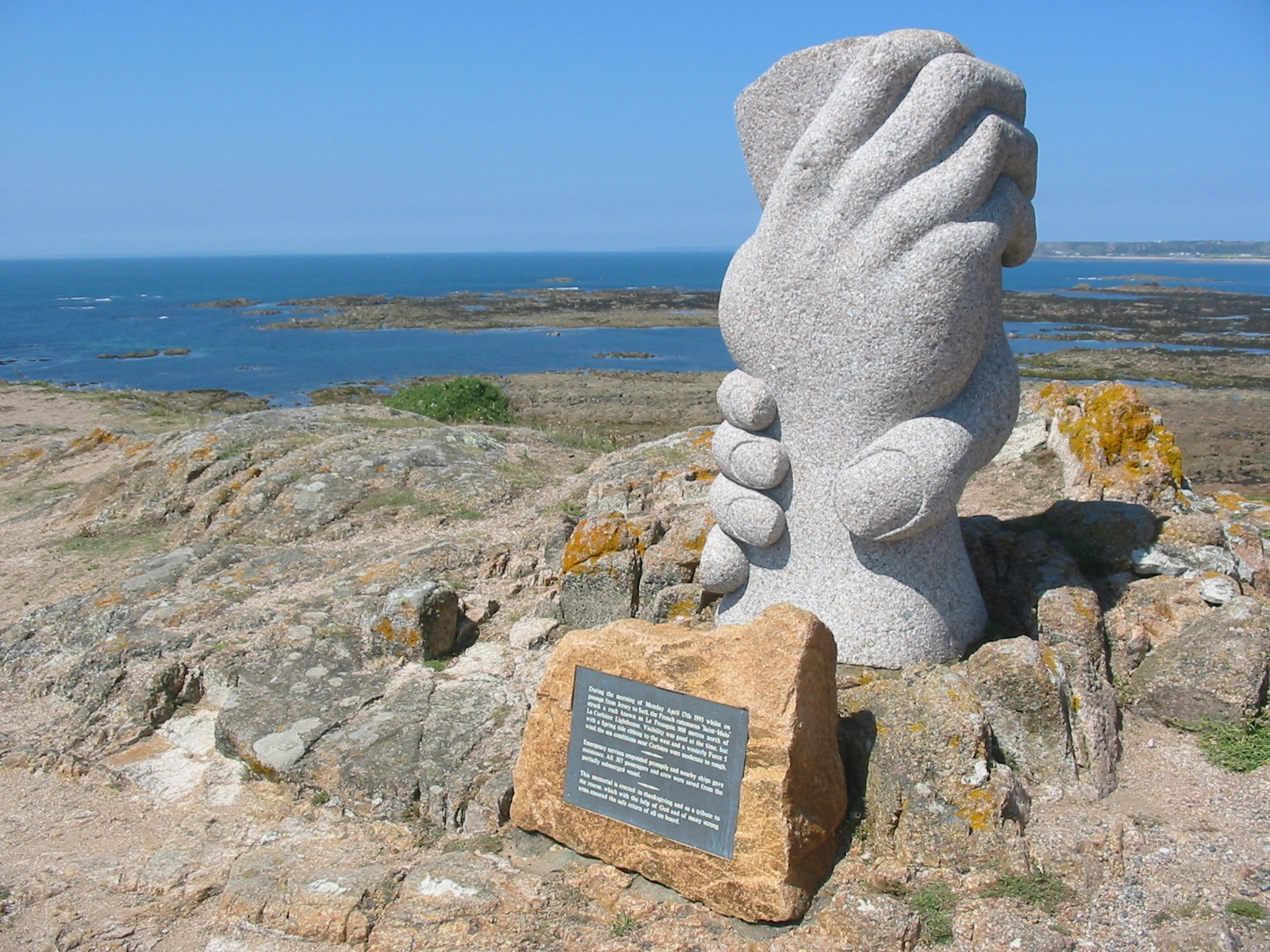
Saint-Malo sculpture commemorating the maritime rescue in 1995

The rescue effort was commemorated by a sculpture overlooking the lighthouse, sculpted by Derek Tristram, and unveiled in April 1997. The sculptor had searched for three months to locate a suitable piece of stone without flaws to produce the sculpture from. Eventually, a suitable piece of Jersey granite was located which had previously been part of the wall of Saint Helier Harbour. The accompanying plaque reads:

"During the morning of Monday April 17th 1995 whilst on passage from Jersey to Sark, the French catamaran Saint-Malo struck a rock known as La Frouquie, 900 metres north of La Corbière Lighthouse. Visibility was good at the time, but with a spring tide ebbing to the west and a westerly Force 5 wind, the sea conditions near Corbière were moderate to rough."

"Emergency services responded promptly and nearby ships gave assistance. All 307 passengers and crew were saved from the partially submerged vessel."

"This memorial is erected in thanksgiving and as a tribute to the rescue, which with the help of God and of many strong arms, ensured the safe return of all on board."
