= Commodore Clipper =

Car Ferry

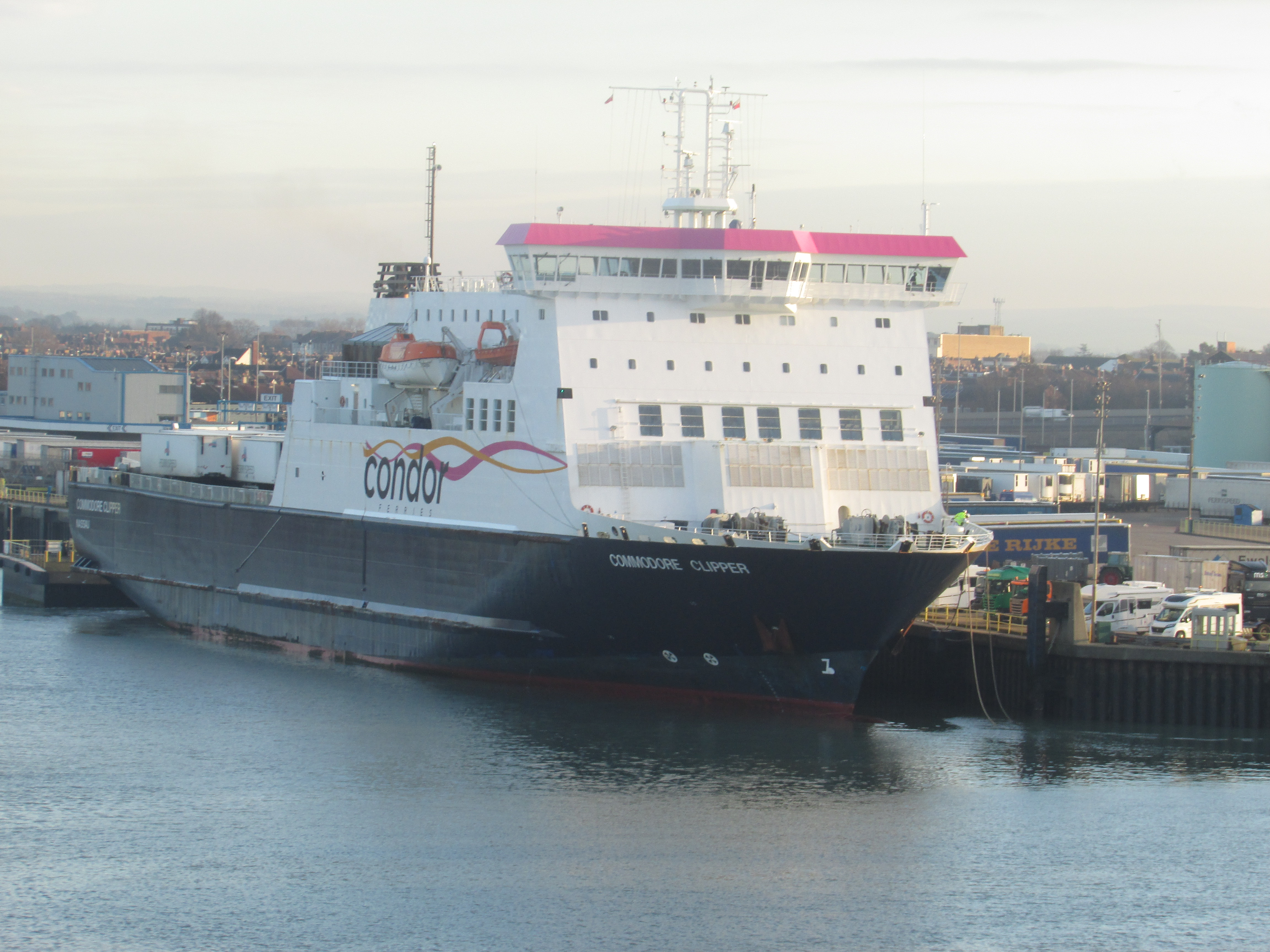
- Commodore Clipper in Portsmouth

History
- Name: Commodore Clipper
- Owner: 1999-2004: Commodore Shipping; 2004-2025: Condor Ferries; 2025-present: Brittany Ferries
- Operator: 1999-2004: Commodore Shipping; 2004-2025: Condor Ferries; 2025-present: Brittany Ferries
- Port of registry: Nassau, Bahamas
- Route: Portsmouth⇄Le Havre
- Builder: Van der Giessen de Noord, Netherlands
- Maiden voyage: 1999
- In service: 1999
- Identification: IMO number: 9201750; MMSI number: 308094000; Callsign: C6QQ3
- Status: in active service

General characteristics
- Type: ROPAX ferry
- Tonnage: 13,456 GT
- Length: 129.19 m (423 ft 10 in)
- Beam: 23.4 m (76 ft 9 in)
- Draft: 5.8 m (19 ft 0 in)
- Installed power: 2 × MaK 9M32 diesel engines; 4,320 kW each at 600 rpm; 3x Caterpillar 1MW diesel generators
- Speed: 18.8 knots (34.8 km/h; 21.6 mph)
- Capacity: 500 passengers; 1,265 m (4,150 ft) lane for vehicles
- Crew: 38

Commodore Clipper is a ROPAX ferry operated by Brittany Ferries. Launched in 1999, she saw service between Portsmouth and the Channel Islands under the ownership of Commodore Shipping and later Condor Ferries, until she was transferred to Brittany Ferries for other operations following its acquisition of Condor Ferries in 2024.

== History ==
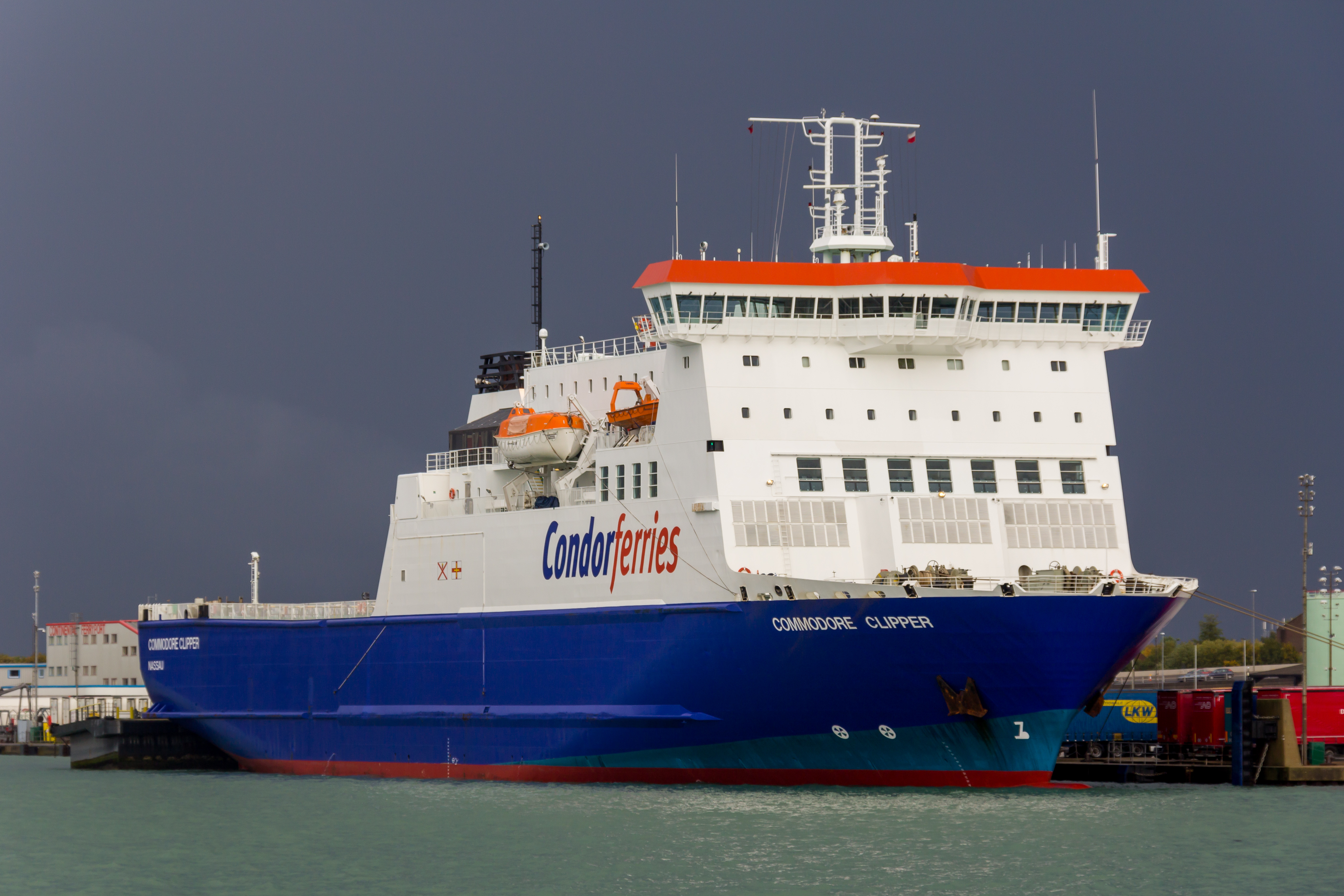
Commodore Clipper in 2013

Commodore Clipper was delivered to Commodore Shipping in 1999 for services between Portsmouth and the Channel Islands, replacing the Havelet and Island Commodore. Major work was needed to accommodate her at the Portsmouth International Port, which involved dredging and the construction of new infrastructure.

In April 2024, it was announced that the vessel would to be chartered from Condor Ferries to Brittany Ferries for operations between Rosslare and Cherbourg, establishing a third weekly-return sailing.

Brittany Ferries acquired Condor Ferries in 2024.

In December 2025, Commodore Clipper was placed on a winter service between Poole and Cherbourg. This was the first time in five years that there has been year-round passenger and freight service between the two ports, following the opening of Brittany Ferries's new Bayonne to Cherbourg rail link. Whilst this initially replaced the Poole to Bilbao service, that service was shortly restarted by redeploying the ferry following a derailment on the line.

In April 2026, the Commodore Clipper was transferred to operate between Portsmouth and Le Havre.

In October 2026 it will move to the Cherbourg to Rosslare route

== Accidents and incidents ==
A fire broke out on the Commodore Clipper's lower vehicle deck in the early hours of 16 June 2010 whilst it was travelling from Jersey to Portsmouth. The fire was the result of an electrical fault in a freight truck loaded with potatoes. A combination of factors, including potatoes from the damaged freight truck blocking onboard drains, prevented water from the drench system from draining. This resulted in the ferry listing to its port side for an extended period of time. 62 passengers were stranded on board the ferry for around 20 hours. Eventually, all passengers safely disembarked the ferry once it arrived in Portsmouth, with the truck pulled out of the ferry, and the fire was put out shortly after. Significant damage was done to the truck and other freight trailers, as well as heat damage to a small area of the lower vehicle deck, and the failure of some onboard systems. It was said that the severity of the fire was increased by the electrical breakers not tripping when they should have.

On 14 July 2014, the Commodore Clipper became grounded on the Little Roussel, a channel between Herm and Guernsey. The cause of the incident was found to be poor planning by the crew on board, who had failed to take an unusually low tide into consideration.

The key findings of an investigation by Marine Accident Investigation Branch were:

- There had not been enough planning for the trip – in part because the repetitive nature of the schedule had led to "complacency".
- The crew refused to acknowledge that the ship might have grounded, partly because the alarms that could have warned them had been disabled
- Insufficient passage planning meant that the bridge team headed into danger without appreciation of the navigational risk. The planning issues not properly considered were: the very low tide, the effect of the ship 'squatting' in shallow water at high speed and the accuracy of the chart data.
- The possibility that the vessel had grounded was denied. In the circumstances of a shuddering vibration, it is important that the crew establish the state of their vessel by searching for damage.
- The repetitive nature of ferry operations can induce a degree of complacency when planning.
- The electronic navigation system was not being utilised effectively because safety settings were not appropriate to the local conditions, warnings were ignored and the audible alarm was disabled.
- As the responsible authority, Guernsey Harbours did not have an effective risk assessment or safety management plan for the conduct of navigation in its statutory pilotage area.

Condor Ferries said it entirely accepted the findings of the detailed and thorough report.

The vessel was taken out of service for several weeks and was repaired in Falmouth. It returned to service on 27 August of the same year.
