= Poseidonas (ship) =

Greek ferry

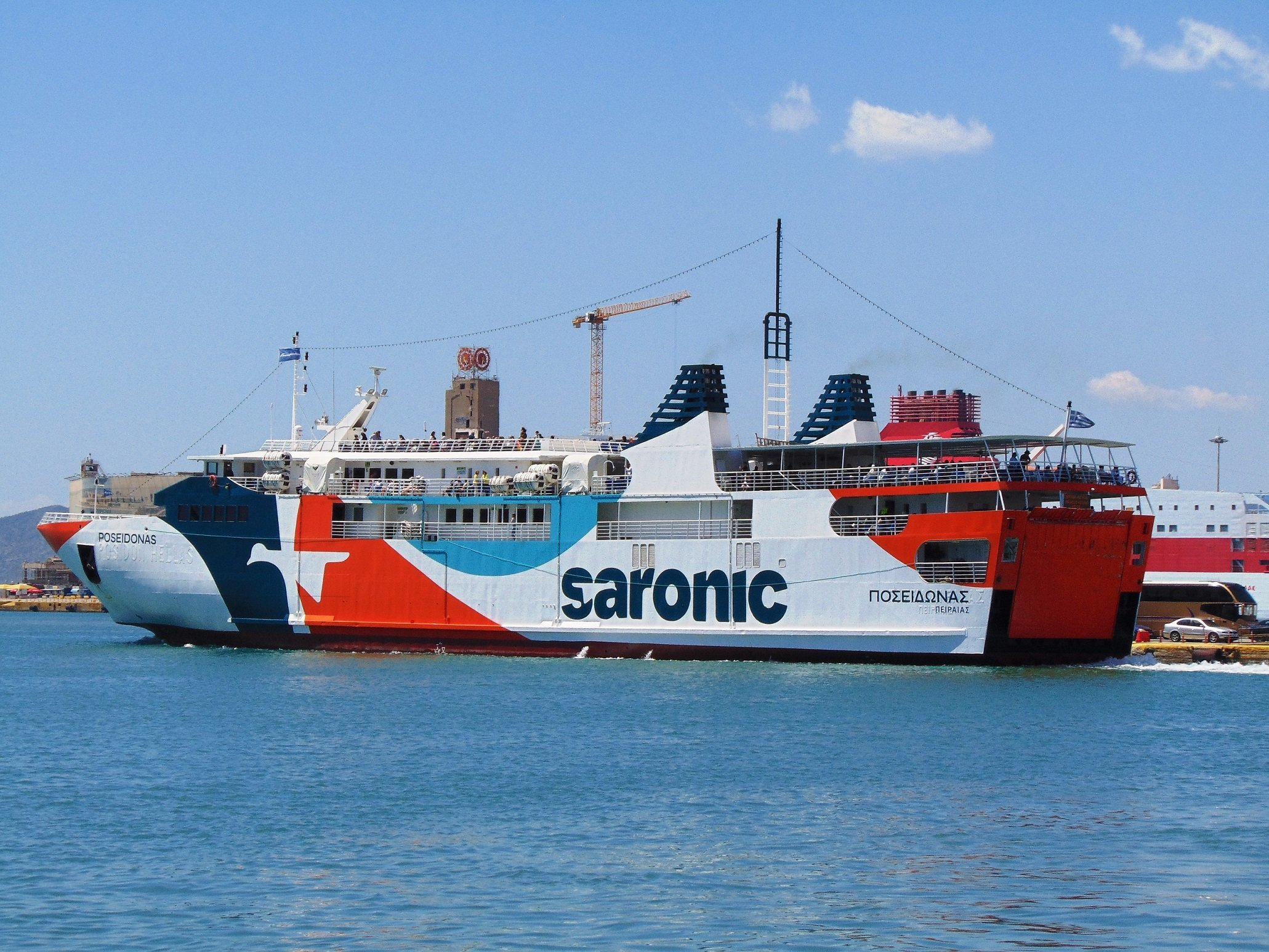
- Poseidonas in Piraeus

History
- Name: (1998–2025): Posidon Hellas; (2025–present): Poseidonas
- Owner: (1998–1999): Saronic Gulf Lines; (1999–2005): Minoan Flying Dolphins / Saronikos Ferries; (2005–2014): Hellenic Seaways; (2014–present): Poseidon Ferries Maritime Co.
- Operator: (1998–1999): Saronic Gulf Lines; (1999–2005): Saronikos Ferries; (2005–2014): Hellenic Seaways; (2014–present): Saronic Ferries
- Port of registry: Piraeus, Greece
- Route: Piraeus – Aegina; Piraeus – Agistri; Piraeus – Methana – Poros
- Builder: Kanellos Shipyards; Perama, Greece
- Launched: 1998
- Completed: 1998
- Acquired: 1998
- Maiden voyage: 1998
- In service: 1998
- Identification: IMO number: 8966963; Call sign: SYJY; MMSI number: 237008100
- Status: In service

General characteristics
- Class & type: Conventional Ro-Ro Passenger Ferry
- Tonnage: 1,802 GT; 891 DWT
- Length: 87.30 m (286 ft 5 in)
- Beam: 13.70 m (44 ft 11 in)
- Draft: 4.20 m (13 ft 9 in)
- Decks: 3 passenger decks
- Ramps: Stern vehicle and passenger ramp
- Installed power: 2 × Wärtsilä 12V200 diesel engines
- Propulsion: 2 × controllable pitch propellers
- Speed: 16.0 knots (29.6 km/h; 18.4 mph) (service) / 18.0 knots (33.3 km/h; 20.7 mph) (max)
- Capacity: 1,100 passengers; 80 cars

Poseidonas (formerly Posidon Hellas) is an 87.3-metre conventional passenger and vehicle ferry built in 1998 by the Kanellos Shipyards in Perama, Greece. Operating under the Saronic Ferries joint venture, the vessel serves key domestic routes in the Saronic Gulf, connecting the port of Piraeus with Aegina, Agistri, Methana, and Poros.

== Service ==
The ferry, initially ordered in January 1992 by the Greek company OTE under the name Thalis o Milisios II, was not built, however, until the construction contract was acquired by Poseidon Consortium Shipping, and was then completed at the Kanellos shipyard in Perama under the name Posidon Hellas and delivered to the company on 5 August 1998, immediately being introduced on the routes between Piraeus, Aegina, Poros, Hydra and Spetses. On 12 November 1999, after about a year of service, the ferry was then sold to Minoan Flying Dolphins, which became Hellenic Seaways in 2005, continuing to operate the previous route, extended to the islands of Methana and Angistri, and limited in 2008 to the ports of Piraeus, Aegina, Angistri, Methana and Poros.

On 26 June 2015 the ferry was sold to 2way Ferries, with which Hellenic Seaways was in partnership through its subsidiary Saronikos Ferries in the joint venture Saronic Ferries, continuing to operate in the Saronic Gulf. In April 2025, with the transfer of the entire fleet of the companies participating in the joint venture under the ownership of Saronic Ferries, the ferry was renamed Poseidonas.
