= MV Panagia Tinou =

A number of motor vessels have been named Panagia Tinou, including –

- MV Panagia Tinou (1969), a 6,228 GRT ferry in service 1981–90
- MV Panagia Tinou (1972), a 5,596 GT ferry in service 2015–16
- MV Panagia Tinou (1976), a 1,787 GT ferry in service 2002–09

See also

- MV Panagia Tinou 2, a 5,643 GT ferry in service 1992–96
