= Hellenic Seaways =

Greek ferry operator

Hellenic Seaways Maritime SA
- Trade name: Hellenic Seaways
- Native name: ΧΕΛΛΕΝΙΚ ΣΗΓΟΥΕΪΣ ΜΟΝΟΠΡΟΣΩΠΗ ΑΝΩΝΥΜΗ ΝΑΥΤΙΛΙΑΚΗ ΕΤΑΙΡΕΙΑ
- Formerly: Ceres Hellenic Shipping Enterprises; Minoan Flying Dolphins; Hellas Flying Dolphins
- Type: Private
- Predecessor: Hellas Ferries
- Founded: February 6, 1984; 42 years ago
- Headquarters: Kallithea, Athens, Greece
- Area served: Greece
- Key people: Konstantinos Klironomos (Chairman); Antonios Agapitos (CEO)
- Products: Shipping
- Services: Passenger transportation Freight transportation
- Revenue: ▲€704.3 million (2014)
- Operating income: ▲€50.1 million (2014)
- Net income: ▲€29.9 million (2014)
- Total assets: ▼€895.7 million (2014)
- Total equity: ▲€678.5 million (2014)
- Number of employees: 1,008 (2015)
- Parent: Attica Group
- Website: www.hellenicseaways.gr

Hellenic Seaways is a Greece-based ferry company founded in 1984. Hellenic Seaways is a subsidiary of Attica Group along with Blue Star Ferries, Superfast Ferries and ANEK Lines.

== History ==
Ceres Hellenic Shipping Enterprises owned by the Livanos family, a hydrofoils company active in the Argo-Saronic Gulf and the Sporades islands was established in 1984. It was renamed Minoan Flying Dolphins (MFD) in 1999. Pantelis Sfinias (Greek: Παντελής Σφηνιάς) had convinced many prominent Greek businessmen to purchase stakes in MFD. His plan was to use the raised capital for purchasing small traditional ferry companies and eventually consolidate the Greek ferry industry. Within a few months, MFD grew rapidly through a barrage of vessel purchases from companies such as Agapitos, Agoudimos, Nomikos Lines, Ventouris Ferries, Goutos, etc. Soon, MFD controlled a market share exceeding 90% in several routes. In addition to its fleet of conventional vessels, MFD operated a number of high-speed craft ordered from Austal.

However, plans of taking the company public collapsed after the Greek stock market crash in the fall of 1999 and the sinking of MFD's Express Samina on 26 September 2000, in which 82 people perished. Two months later, under strong pressure from the stockholders and the media, Sfinias committed suicide by throwing himself out of his sixth floor office window.

MFD was renamed to Hellas Flying Dolphins in the summer of 2001 and Hellenic Seaways in 2005, following the consolidation of its subsidiaries Hellas Ferries, Saronikos Ferries, and Sporades Ferries. Minoan Lines continued to own a large stake exceeding 30% in Hellenic Seaways until 2018, when it was sold to Attica Group.

In August 2009, Hellenic Seaways purchased the single-ship, budget cruise line easyCruise from founder Stelios Haji-Ioannou.

In 2011, it operated more than 35 vessels, servicing more than 35 ports in the Cyclades, North East Aegean, South East Aegean, Crete, Argosaronikos, and Sporades.

In January 2011, Minoan Lines (Heraklion) cancelled the sale of its 33.35% stake in Hellenic Seaways to ANEK and tried to find a new buyer for it.

In June 2018, Minoan Lines (Heraklion) sold its 48.53% stake in Hellenic Seaways to Attica Group for €78.5 million.

== Current fleet ==
Hellenic Seaways operate a large fleet of high-speed craft and conventional ferries.

=== Conventional ferries ===
Ship	Flag	Built	Gross tonnage	Length	Width	Passengers	Cars	Knots	Image
Artemis	(Greece)	1997	1,612 GT	89.8 m	14 m	512	58	19.2	
Nissos Rodos	(Greece)	1987	29,733 GT	192.5 m	27 m	2,210	748	22	
Nissos Samos	(Greece)	1988	30,435 GT	192.9 m	29.4 m	2,202	656	20.5	

=== Highspeed series ===
Ship	Flag	Built	Gross tonnage	Length	Width	Passengers	Cars	Knots	Image
Hellenic Highspeed	(Greece)	1997	4.463 GT	100 m	17 m	724	165	35	
Highspeed 3	(Greece)	1998	5.992 GT	86.6 m	24 m	1.068	215	42	

=== AERO Highspeed series ===
Ship	Flag	Built	Gross tonnage	Length	Width	Passengers	Knots	Image
AERO 1 Highspeed	(Greece)	2022	347 GT	36 m	9.7 m	150	32.2	
AERO 2 Highspeed	(Greece)	2022	347 GT	36 m	9.7 m	150	32.2	
AERO 3 Highspeed	(Greece)	2022	347 GT	36 m	9.7 m	150	32.2	
AERO 4 Highspeed	(Greece)	2017	499 GT	40.5 m	10.8 m	270	32	
AERO 5 Highspeed	(Greece)	2018	499 GT	40.5 m	10.8 m	270	32	

== Current routes ==
Cyclades

- Lavrio–Kea–Kythnos–Andros–Tinos–Syros–Paros–Naxos–Ios–Sikinos–Folegandros–Kimolos–Milos–Kimolos–Sifnos–Serifos (Artemis)

North Aegean

- Piraeus–Chios–Mytilene (Nissos Samos)

Crete

- Piraeus–Heraklion (Nissos Rodos)

Argosaronikos

- Piraeus–Aegina–Agistri (Aero 1, Aero 2, & Aero 3)
- Piraeus–Poros–Hydra–Ermioni–Spetses–Porto Heli (Aero 1, Aero 2, & Aero 3)

== Terminated routes ==
Hellenic Seaways covered itineraries to Chania in Crete island in the summer periods from 2004–2006 with the high-speed vessel Highspeed 4 in 4 hours and 30 minutes, and in summer 2007 with the passenger ferry Ariadne. The company also launched routes from Piraeus to Rethymno port, in Crete with Highspeed 5 in summer 2008. In the summer season of 2010, Hellenic Seaways launched for the first time itineraries from Piraeus to Dodecanese islands, Kos and Rhodes, (through Paros) with the passenger ferry Nissos Rodos, but after an unsuccessful period they were cancelled.

Until early summer 2018, Hellenic Seaways sailed from Heraklion in Crete to Mykonos with calls at the ports of Santorini, Ios and Paros with Highspeed 7. Then, Hellenic Seaways withdrew from the route, due to Highspeed 7 being transferred to Minoan Lines as part of the deal for the sale of Minoan's stake in Hellenic Seaways to Attica Group. The vessel, however, remained in the route under the flag of its new owner and the new name Santorini Palace.

== Saronic Ferries joint venture ==
In late 2013, Hellenic Seaways formed a joint venture with Saronic Gulf rivals Nova Ferries and 2way Ferries. Created to offer better schedules and better prices for the consumers, the joint venture marketed as Saronic Ferries, using four vessels and covering a total of four destinations. After selling the ferries Posidon Hellas and Apollon Hellas to 2way Ferries in 2015 and 2016 respectively, Hellenic Seaways left the joint venture.

== Awards and nominations ==
In 2007, Hellenic Seaways was awarded by Lloyd's List Greek Shipping Awards as "The Best Passenger Line of the Year 2007", and their then new-building vessel, Nissos Chios, was awarded with the prize of "The Best Ship of the Year 2007". Her sister ship, the Nissos Mykonos, had also won the same award in 2006. In 2014, Hellenic Seaways was again awarded by Lloyd's List Greek Shipping Awards as "The Best Passenger Line of the Year 2014".

== Former fleet ==
The following list includes former vessels of the current company and of its predecessors and subsidiaries.

- Express Skiathos (sold to Seajets in 2024)
- Highspeed 1 (IMO: 9125932)
- Highspeed 2 (IMO: 9216169)
- Highspeed 3 (IMO: 9216171)
- Highspeed 4 (IMO: 9216183)
- Highspeed 5/7 (IMO: 9329095)
- Highspeed 6 (IMO: 9221346)
- Flyingcat 1 (IMO: 8916865)
- Flyingcat 2 (IMO: 9185683)
- Flyingcat 3
- Flyingcat 4
- Flyingcat 5
- Flyingcat 6
- Nissos Mykonos
- Nissos Chios
- Hellenic Carrier (scrapped)
- Hellenic Sailor (scrapped)
- Hellenic Trader (scrapped)
- Hellenic Master (scrapped)
- Express Apollon (scrapped) (IMO: 7235915)
- Express Poseidon (scrapped) (IMO: 7302885)
- Express Adonis (scrapped)
- Express Samina (sunk) (IMO: 6613548)
- Express Aphrodite (scrapped)
- Express Hermes (scrapped)
- Express Aris (scrapped)
- Express Athina (scrapped)
- Express Danae (scrapped)
- Express Santorini
- Express Athina (scrapped)
- Express Anemos
- Express Milos (scrapped)
- Express Naias (scrapped)
- Express Olympia (scrapped)
- Express Pegasus (scrapped)
- Panagia Ekatodapiliani (scrapped)
- Eutichia
- Saronikos
- Limnos (scrapped)
- Faidra (scrapped)
- Papadiamantis (sank)
- Makedon
- Erotokritos (scrapped) (IMO: 7394747)
- Aias
- Nefeli (IMO: 8911140)
- Poseidon Hellas (IMO: 8966963)
- Apollon Hellas (IMO: 8807105)
- Aegina (scrapped)
- Ellas
- Afaia
- Apostolos (sank)
- Flying Dolphin I
- Flying Dolphin II
- Flying Dolphin III
- Flying Dolphin IV (IMO: 7933385)
- Flying Dolphin V
- Flying Dolphin VI (scrapped)
- Flying Dolphin VII
- Flying Dolphin VIII
- Flying Dolphin IX
- Flying Dolphin X (IMO: 7939004)
- Flying Dolphin XI
- Flying Dolphin XII (IMO: 7942312)
- Flying Dolphin XIV
- Flying Dolphin XV (IMO: 8132043)
- Flying Dolphin XVI (IMO: 8038637)
- Flying Dolphin XVIII (scrapped)
- Flying Dolphin XIX
- Flying Dolphin XX (IMO: 7937226)
- Flying Dolphin XXI (scrapped)
- Flying Dolphin XXII (IMO: 7729928)
- Flying Dolphin XXIII
- Flying Dolphin XXIV (scrapped)
- Flying Dolphin XXV (scrapped)
- Flying Dolphin XXVI
- Flying Dolphin XXVII (scrapped)
- Flying Dolphin XXVIII (scrapped)
- Mega Dolphin XXX (scrapped)
- Mega Dolphin XXXI (scrapped)
- Mega Dolphin XXXII (scrapped)
- Star Trailer (scrapped)
- Sea Trailer (scrapped)
