= Apollon Hellas =

Greek ferry operating in the Saronic Gulf

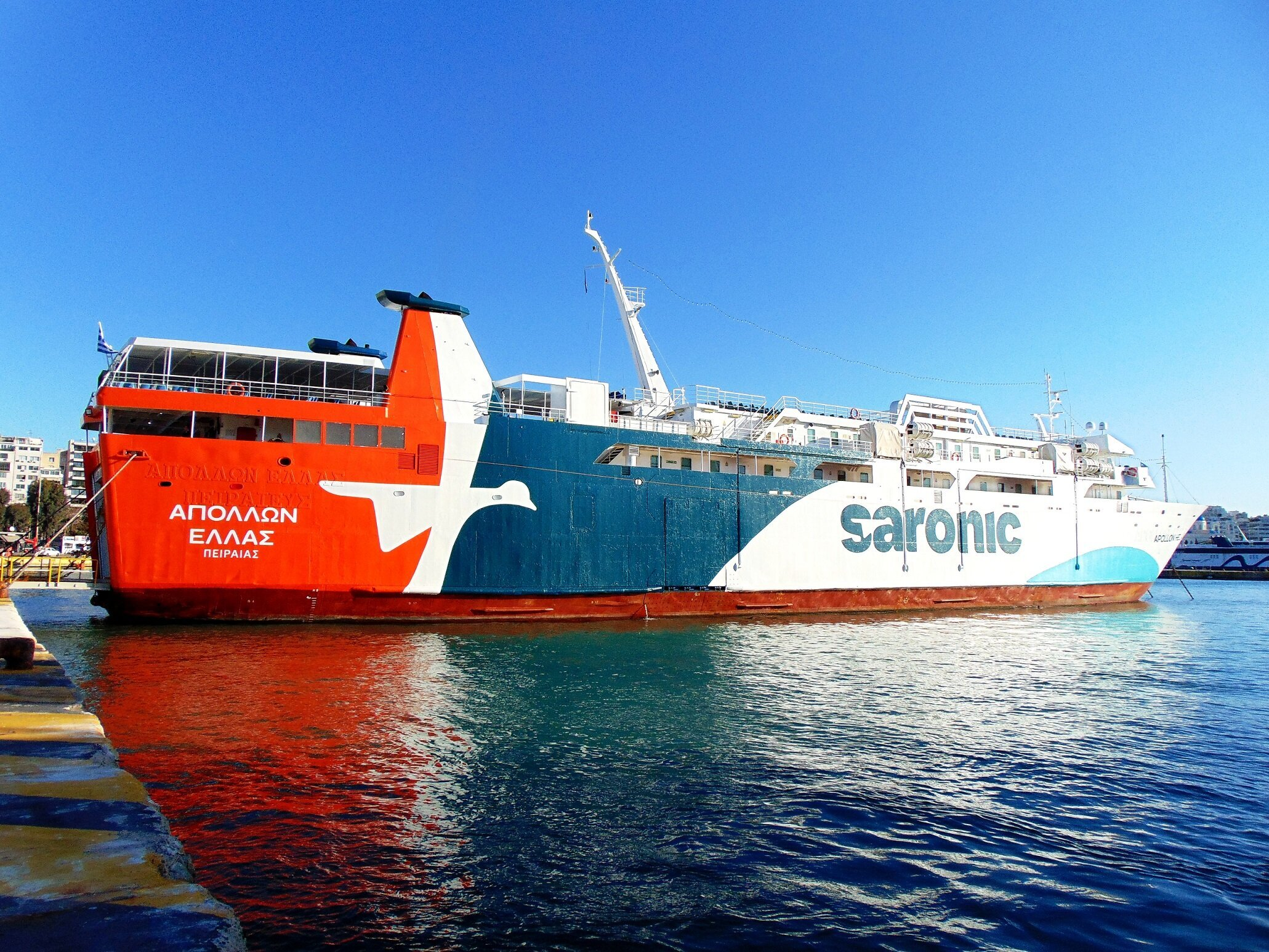
- Apollon Hellas in Piraeus

History
- Name: (1990–1995): Georgios; (1995–1999): Sun Beach; (1999–present): Apollon Hellas
- Owner: (1990–1995): Akouriki Naftiki Eteria; (1995–1999): Han II Leasing Co. Ltd.; (1999): Lepanto Express Naftiki Eteria; (1999–2005): Minoan Flying Dolphins / Saronikos Ferries; (2005–2016): Hellenic Seaways; (2016–present): Apollon Ferries Maritime Co. / 2wayferries
- Operator: (1990–1995): Akouriki Naftiki Eteria; (1995–1999): Han II Leasing Co. Ltd.; (1999–2005): Saronikos Ferries; (2005–2016): Hellenic Seaways; (2016–present): Saronic Ferries
- Port of registry: Piraeus, Greece
- Route: Piraeus – Aegina; Piraeus – Agistri; Piraeus – Methana – Poros
- Builder: Proteus Z. Vassiliadis Bros. Nafpigiki Ltd.; Ampelakia, Salamina, Greece
- Yard number: 44
- Laid down: January 1990
- Launched: 1990
- Completed: 1 December 1990
- Acquired: 1999
- Maiden voyage: 1990
- In service: 1990
- Identification: IMO number: 8807105; Call sign: SWFP; MMSI number: 237002600
- Status: In service

General characteristics
- Class & type: Conventional Ro-Ro Passenger Ferry
- Tonnage: 1,821 GT; 1,032 DWT
- Length: 91.80 m (301 ft 2 in)
- Beam: 14.52 m (47 ft 8 in)
- Draft: 3.80 m (12 ft 6 in)
- Depth: 4.50 m (14 ft 9 in)
- Decks: 4
- Ramps: Stern vehicle and passenger ramp
- Installed power: 2 × MAN-B&W 16U28L 16-cylinder diesel engines (total ~4,158–5,655 kW)
- Propulsion: 2 × controllable pitch propellers
- Speed: 16.0 knots (29.6 km/h; 18.4 mph) (service / max)
- Capacity: 1,380 passengers; 100–120 cars

Apollon Hellas is a 91.8-metre conventional passenger and vehicle ferry built in 1990 by Proteus Z. Vassiliadis Bros. Nafpigiki Ltd. in Ampelakia, Greece. Originally named Georgios and later Sun Beach, she was acquired by Minoan Flying Dolphins / Saronikos Ferries in 1999 and renamed Apollon Hellas. She currently operates under the Saronic Ferries joint venture, serving high-frequency coastal ferry routes connecting Piraeus with Aegina, Agistri, Methana, and Poros.

== Service ==
The ferry, commissioned by Akouriki Shipping Company from the "Proteus" shipyard Z. Vassiliadis Bros. Nafpigiki Ltd of Ampelakia, on the island of Salamina, was launched on 15 March 1990 with the name Georgios and delivered the following December to the Greek company, which placed it on the routes between Piraeus, Aegina, Angistri, Methana, Poros, Hydra, Ermioni and Spetses. In the following years, the ferry was used regularly in the Saronic gulf, until 1995, when, with the imminent entry into service of the new Georgios 2, it was sold to the South Korean company, which renamed it Sun Beach and placed it on the routes between Nokdong and Jeju, where it operated however for only two years, since in 1997, with the bankruptcy of the company, it was laid up on the island. It remained there for another two years, until 1999, when it was bought back in Greece by Poseidon Shipping, which changed its name to Apollon Hellas and reintroduced it in the connections between Piraeus, Aegina, Methana, Poros, Hydra and Spetses, which it continued to serve even after the acquisition of the company by Minoan Flying Dolphins, which took place on 18 November of the same year, which transferred it in 2000 under the banner of Saronikos Ferries, and from 2005 under that of the newly formed Hellenic Seaways, continuing also in this last case to serve the connection in the Saronic Gulf, without however carrying out the last two calls.

In 2014, after about fifteen years of uninterrupted service in the Saronic Gulf, the ferry was moved to the Sporades, on the connections between Volos, Skiathos, Skopelos and Alonnisos, while continuing to operate on the previous route during the winter, under the banner of the newly formed joint venture with 2wayFerries, Saronic Ferries. In 2015 the Volos port was then moved to Agios Konstantinos. The following year the ferry was sold, this time to the partner 2wayFerries, who, after having used it for the summer in the Sporades, reintroduced it in 2017 on a permanent basis on the connections between Piraeus, Aegina, Methana and Poros, being finally transferred in 2024 under the ownership of the joint venture.
