= Hyperspeed Jet 4 =

Greek Flagged HSC

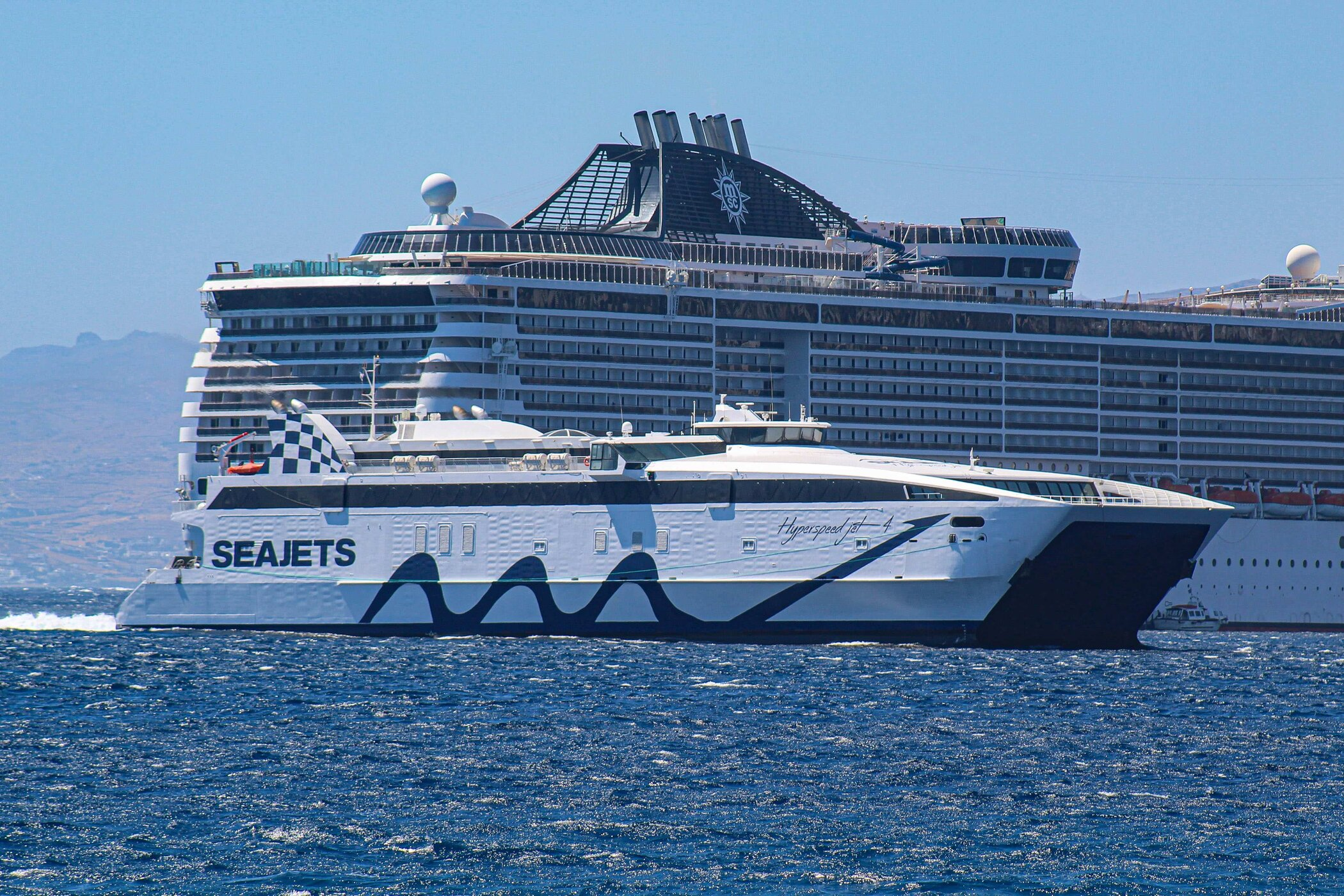
- Hyperspeed Jet 4 in Mykonos

History
- Name: 2000–2026: Highspeed 4; 2026–present: Hyperspeed Jet 4
- Operator: 2000–2004: Minoan Flying Dolphins; 2004–2026: Hellenic Seaways; 2026–present: Seajets
- Port of registry: 2000–present: Piraeus, Greece
- Builder: Austal; Henderson, Australia
- Yard number: 97
- Launched: 2000
- Completed: 2000
- Maiden voyage: 2000
- In service: 2000
- Identification: IMO number: 9216183
- Status: In service

General characteristics (as built)
- Tonnage: 4,156 GT, 470 DWT
- Length: 96.2 m (315 ft 7 in)
- Beam: 24.0 m (78 ft 9 in)
- Draft: 3.9 m (12 ft 10 in)
- Depth: 7.8 m (25 ft 7 in)
- Installed power: 4 x Caterpillar 3618 diesel engines
- Propulsion: 4 x KaMeWa 112 sII waterjets
- Speed: 40.5 knots (75.0 km/h; 46.6 mph)
- Capacity: 1,050 passengers excluding crew; 188 cars
- Crew: 36

Hyperspeed Jet 4 is a 92.5 m (303 ft 6 in) high speed catamaran operated by Seajets. Since its launching in 2000, it was operating for Hellenic Seaways (Attica Group) under the name Highspeed 4. In early 2026 it was sold to Seajets.

== Service ==
The catamaran, part of a series of fast ferries commissioned by Minoan Flying Dolphins to the specialist shipyard Austal, was launched on 30 April 2000 at the Fremantle shipyard as Highspeed 4 and delivered on 10 July to the Greek company, for which it began service on 1 August on the route between Piraeus, Paros, Naxos, to which intermediate calls at Syros, Tinos and Mykonos were added in 2003. In 2005, following the transfer to the newly formed Hellenic Seaways, the catamaran was then used on the connections between Piraeus and Chania, which the following year was added as the final call to the previous route, which resumed operations. In the following years, the catamaran continued to operate the connections between the Athenian port and the Cyclades, occasionally calling at Ios and operating in tandem with the '5. In 2014 it was then transferred to the connections between Piraeus, Paros, Naxos, Koufonissia and Amorgos, where it remained for only one season, since in 2015 it was immediately moved to the connections between Heraklion,Santorini, Ios, Paros and Mykonos as a replacement for the '5, finally returning to its own route the following year.

In 2025, after nine years of service on the route, the catamaran was again transferred to the summer connections between Piraeus, Mykonos, Naxos, Ios, Santorini and Heraklion.On 17 March 2026, after approximately twenty-six years of service for the Greek company, the catamaran was sold together with four other units of the fleet to the compatriot Seajets, for a total of approximately 25 million dollars. Following this, the catamaran was transferred to the Eleusis shipyards, where it was renamed Hyperspeed Jet 4 and transferred under the new company's flag. Following this, on 28 May, at the end of the technical stop, the catamaran was placed on the connections between Piraeus, Naxos, Koufonissia and Amorgos. On 19 June it was then moved to the connections between Rafina, Andros, Tinos and Mykonos.

== Accidents and Incidents ==
On 16 June 2024, the high-speed ro-ro passenger ferry Hyperspeed Jet 4 sustained minor material damage when its starboard stern section contacted the pier during a docking maneuver at the port of Rafina. The vessel had arrived without passengers from the port of Lavrio, carrying a crew of 42. No other vessels were present in the harbor at the time of the minor collision.

The ship was scheduled to depart Rafina on a multi-destination itinerary to Andros, Tinos, and Mykonos with 215 passengers and 33 vehicles on board. Although the Central Port Authority of Rafina initially issued a detention order, the vessel was cleared to resume its scheduled routes after its monitoring classification society inspected the damage and issued a certificate maintaining its class. No injuries or marine environmental pollution were reported from the incident.
