= Vortigern (disambiguation) =

Vortigern was a legendary 5th-century British ruler.

Vortigern can also refer to:

- HMS Vortigern (D37), a British Royal Navy V class destroyer
- Wyrtgeorn, King of the Wends (born circa 980) sometimes Westernised as "Vortigern"
- MV Vortigern, a Sealink Cross Channel Ferry
- Vortigern and Rowena, a forged Shakespeare play actually written by William Henry Ireland
