= Nissos Samos =

Greek ferry

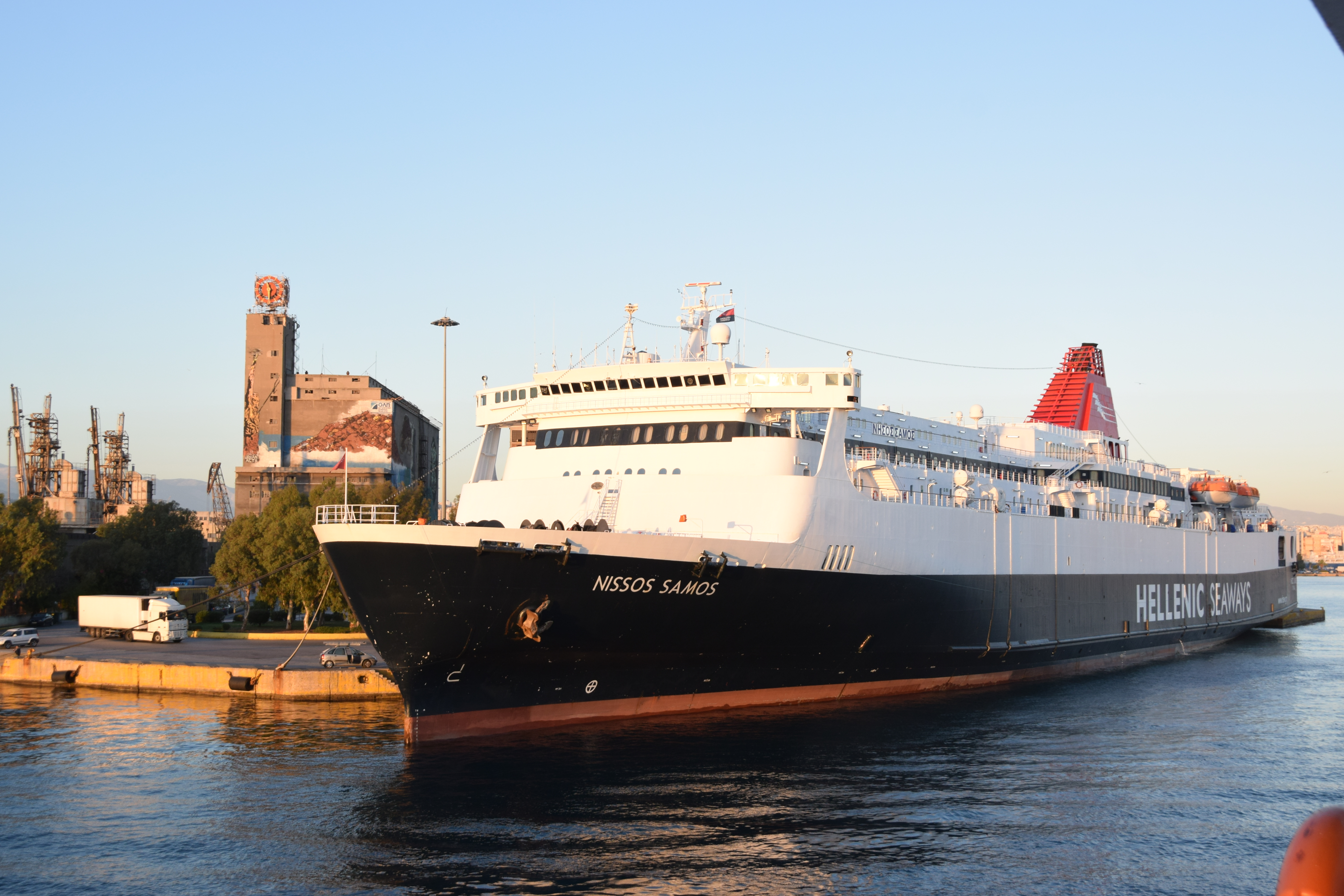
- Nissos Samos in Piraeus.

History

Greece
- Name: New Akashia (1988–2004) Ionian Glory (2004–2005) Ionian Queen (2005–2015) Nissos Samos (2015-Present)
- Namesake: Island of Samos
- Owner: Shin Nihonkai Ferry (1988–2004); Endeavor Lines (2004–2015); Hellenic Seaways (2015–2018); Attica Group (2018-Present)
- Operator: Shin Nihonkai Ferry (1988–2004); Endeavor Lines (2005–2012); Hellenic Seaways (2016–present)
- Port of registry: Piraeus, Greece
- Ordered: 1987
- Builder: Ishikawajima-Harima Heavy Industries (IHI), Tokyo, Japan
- Yard number: 2972
- Launched: 1988
- Completed: June 1988
- Identification: IMO number: 8712635; MMSI: 241470000; Call sign: SVAI7
- Status: In service

General characteristics
- Type: Ro-pax ferry
- Tonnage: 30,435 GT
- Length: 192.91 m (632.9 ft)
- Beam: 29.40 m (96.5 ft)
- Draft: 6.74 m (22.1 ft)
- Installed power: 26,100 kW (Total)
- Propulsion: 2 × Pielstick 9PC40L diesel engines
- Speed: 20.5 knots (service); 22 knots (max)
- Capacity: 2,213 passengers; 750 cars (2,400 lane meters)

Nissos Samos (Νήσος Σάμος , Nísos Sámos ) is a ferry operated by the Greek company Hellenic Seaways. Built in 1988 at the IHI shipyard in Kure for the Japanese company Shin Nihonkai Ferry, it originally operated between the islands of Honshu and Hokkaido under the name New Akashia (ニューあかしあ, Nyū Akashia ) ^{.} Sold in 2004 to the Greek company Endeavor Lines, it was initially renamed Ionian Glory and then finally Ionian Queen, sailing on routes between Greece and Italy until 2012, when its owner went bankrupt. Laid up for approximately three years in Patras, it was eventually bought by the Hellenic Seaways company, which renamed it Nissos Samos. It currently sails in the Aegean Sea and serves the North Aegean.

== History ==
=== Origins and construction ===
In the late 1980s, the Shin Nihonkai Ferry company gradually renewed its fleet operating between Honshū and Hokkaidō. After the introduction in 1984 of the imposing Ferry Lilac on the direct route between Maizuru and Otaru, the Japanese shipping company considered deploying a second new vessel on this route to replace the Ferry Akashia.

The future vessel is designed similarly to the Lilac Ferry, with a length of 192 meters. Intended to carry 800 passengers and 80 vehicles, its passenger capacity is greater than its predecessor, as is its rolling capacity. Passenger conditions are also significantly improved compared to other vessels, with larger and more comfortable spaces. These still include a restaurant, a grill, a café, and lounges, but now also several corridors with sea views and an outdoor swimming pool.

Intended to replace the ferry Akashia, the new vessel, named New Akashia, was built by the IHI shipyard. The keel was laid in Kure on February 5, 1988, and the ship was launched on April 27. After two and a half months of finishing work, it was delivered to Shin Nihonkai on July 8, 1988.

=== Service ===
==== Shin Nihonkai Ferry (1988–2004) ====
The New Akashia entered service on July 16, 1988, between Maizuru and Otaru, and was then the largest car ferry in Japan. It operated in tandem with the Ferry Lilac, whose hull shape served as the basis for its design. In 1991, this duo was joined by the Ferry Lavender, sister ship of the New Akashia.

In 1997, the ship was repainted in Shin Nihonkai's new colors with the logo inscribed in blue on its hull, replacing the traditional green stripe.

In July 2004, the New Akashia was replaced on its route by the new Hamanasu. In November, it was sold to Althea Int, a subsidiary of the Greek company Endeavor Lines.

==== Endeavor Lines (2004–2012) ====
Delivered to its new owner in December 2004, the ship was renamed Ionian Glory. It left Japan on December 20 for Greece. Arriving in Perama on January 13, 2005, it underwent some modifications and then began its service between Greece and Italy on August 20 under the name Ionian Queen.

In February 2011, the ship was chartered to evacuate the Libyan population due to the civil war. It made two trips between Benghazi and Heraklion for this purpose, from February 28 to March 6.

On September 11, 2012, the Ionian Queen was laid up in Patras due to its owner's financial difficulties. With Endeavor Lines having gone into liquidation, the ship was decommissioned and left in port awaiting a potential buyer. It was finally acquired on December 12, 2015, by Hellenic Seaways for €3 million.

==== Hellenic Seaways (since 2015) ====
Taken over by Hellenic Seaways, the ship became the Nissos Samos. After some renovation work and being painted in the colors of its new owner, the ship entered service on July 29, 2016, between Piraeus and various islands in the Aegean Sea in the Cyclades and Dodecanese archipelagos.

== Facilities ==
The Nissos Samos has eight decks. While the ship actually spans ten decks, two are absent at the car deck level to allow the ship to carry cargo. During the ship's Japanese ownership, deck numbering began with the lowest car deck (corresponding to deck 1). Passenger quarters occupied decks 3, 4, and 5, while the aft section of deck 3 was reserved for the crew. Decks 1, 2, and 3 housed the car decks. Currently, the commercial numbering corresponds to the total number of decks, even including the two decks that were previously absent at the car deck level. The passenger quarters remain in the same location, while the crew quarters have been moved to the forward section of deck 8.

=== Common areas ===
During the New Akashia era, most of the facilities were located at the rear of deck 4. Passengers had access to a restaurant, a grill, a café, two lounges, and an outdoor area with a swimming pool. In addition to these main amenities, the ship also offered a telecine room on deck 5, two public baths (called sentō ) on deck 4—one for men and one for women—a shop, a video game room, and a gym.

Now, most of these facilities have been removed and replaced with lounge chairs. The swimming pool has also been removed.

=== Cabins ===
On board the New Akashia, the cabins were divided into two categories according to the level of comfort. Thus, the ship was equipped in 1st class with four double cabins, 31 four-person cabins and two Japanese-style double cabins, as well as twelve Western-style dormitories and eight Japanese-style dormitories in 2nd class.

Since its sale in Greece, the type and distribution of cabins have undergone significant changes with the removal of 2nd class dormitories and the addition of four-berth cabins with private sanitary facilities including shower, toilet and sink.

== Features ==
The Nissos Samos is 192.90 meters long and 29.40 meters wide. Its original tonnage was 19,796 GT (which is not entirely accurate, as the tonnage of Japanese car ferries is defined using different criteria), then increased to 30,694 GT in 2004. It could originally carry 800 passengers, 80 vehicles, and 186 trailers in its garage, accessible via two aft ramp doors—one axial and the other on the starboard side—as well as a forward ramp door. The ship now has a capacity of 2,202 passengers and 750 vehicles, and access to its garage is now via two aft axial ramp doors. The Nissos Samos is powered by two Pielstick 8PC40L diesel engines, producing 17,480 kW of power, driving two variable-pitch propellers that propel the vessel at a speed of 21.5 knots. It is also equipped with a bow thruster, a stern thruster, and a roll stabilizer. At the time, safety equipment consisted primarily of life rafts and a rigid inflatable rescue boat. Since 2004, the ship has been equipped with four large, enclosed lifeboats.

=== Routes served ===
For Shin Nihonkai Ferry, from 1988 to 2004, the New Akashia was mainly used between the islands of Honshū and Hokkaidō on the Maizuru - Otaru line.

From July 2005, the ship was assigned to the Adriatic Sea under the colors of the Endeavor Lines company between Greece and Italy on the Patras - Igoumenitsa - Bari route and then from 2008 on Patras - Igoumenitsa - Corfu - Brindisi.

As of 2026, the ferry has been assigned to Hellenic Seaways routes in the Aegean Sea between Piraeus, Chios and Mytilene.

== Accidents and Incidents ==
=== 2021 colliision (Chios) ===
On 9 November 2021, during the evening hours, the vessel struck the pier at the port of Chios during docking maneuvers, causing material damage to a large section of the wharf. The ship was executing a scheduled itinerary from Mytilene to Chios, Psara, and Piraeus, carrying 299 passengers, 72 trucks, 46 cars, and 18 motorcycles.

The Local Ship Inspection Team of the Central Port Authority of Chios immediately boarded the vessel and confirmed that there was no engine malfunction or water ingress. No injuries or marine pollution were reported. Although the port authority initially issued a detention order, the restriction was lifted after the ship's classification society presented a certificate maintaining its class. The vessel was then cleared to depart for the port of Piraeus via Psara with its passengers and cargo.

==== 2022 grounding and collision (Chios) ====
On 19 May 2022, during the morning hours, the ship encountered docking difficulties at the northern pier of the port of Chios due to adverse weather conditions, prompting the captain to request tugboat assistance. The tug Michalis S. along with two pilot launches, Nikolaos L. and Isidoros S., deployed to assist. After confirming that the ship suffered no mechanical failures or water ingress, the captain initiated a new docking attempt at the western side of the port. During this maneuver, the vessel made minor, negligible contact with the wharf.

Passengers bound for Chios were safely disembarked with the Fire Service and National Emergency Aid Centre (EKAB) standby on site, and the ship subsequently shifted to the northern pier to discharge vehicles. The ferry was operating its scheduled itinerary from Piraeus to Psara, Chios, and Mytilene, carrying 332 passengers, 83 cars, 104 trucks, 18 motorcycles, and 86 crew members. No injuries or marine pollution were reported. The Central Port Authority of Chios initially detained the vessel, but cleared it to depart for Mytilene with its remaining passengers and cargo after its classification society issued a certificate of seaworthiness.

===== 2023 collision (Chios) =====
On 8 July 2023, during the midday hours, the vessel struck the red-light breakwater on its port side at the waterline while entering the port of Chios, causing structural damage to the pier. The ship was operating its scheduled itinerary from Mytilene to Chios and Piraeus, carrying 141 passengers, 38 vehicles, and 88 crew members.

The vessel safely completed its docking maneuver in Chios, and no injuries, marine pollution, or damage to onboard vehicles were reported. The Central Port Authority of Chios initially issued a detention order. Following an inspection by the Local Ship Inspection Team accompanied by divers, and the presentation of a seaworthiness certificate from its classification society, the vessel was cleared for a single transit without passengers or cargo to the port of Piraeus. The operating company arranged alternative transport for the passengers via another vessel departing from the port of Mesta.

== See also ==
=== References ===
==== External links ====
- Official Hellenic Seaways: Nissos Samos Deck Plans
- VesselFinder: NISSOS SAMOS AIS
