= Iolkos (ship) =

Greek catamaran

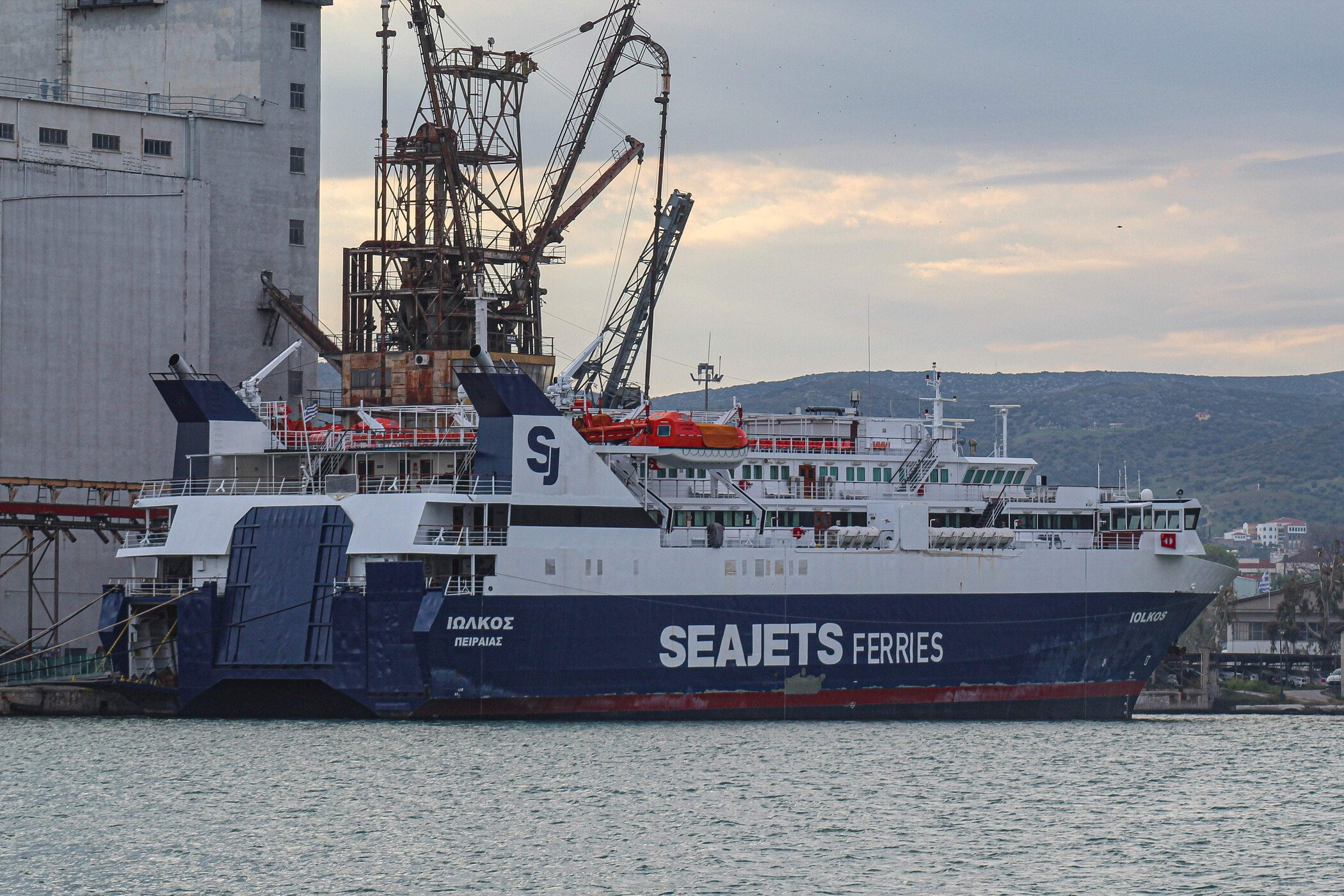
- Iolkos laid up in Volos

History
- Name: 1996: Haroula; 1996–2000: Supercat Haroula; 2000–2005: Express Haroula; 2005–2024: Express Skiathos; 2024–present: Iolkos
- Owner: 1996–1999: Valtetsi Shipping Corp.; 1999–2005: Minoan Flying Dolphins Maritime SA; 2005–2024: Hellenic Seaways (Attica Group); 2024–present: 4Naver Shipholding Ltd / Seajets
- Operator: 1996–2000: Goutos Lines; 2000–2005: Minoan Flying Dolphins; 2005–2024: Hellenic Seaways; 2024–present: Seajets
- Port of registry: Piraeus, Greece
- Route: Volos ↔ Skiathos – Skopelos – Alonissos
- Builder: Vernicos Shipyard; Perama, Greece
- Yard number: 1
- Laid down: 30 September 1992
- Launched: 1996
- Completed: 1 June 1996
- Acquired: April 2024
- Maiden voyage: June 1996
- In service: 1996
- Identification: IMO number: 9064803; Call sign: SWHM; MMSI number: 237066000
- Status: in service

General characteristics
- Class & type: Ro-Pax Ferry
- Tonnage: 4,885 GT; 529 DWT
- Length: 77.85 m (255 ft 5 in)
- Beam: 22.00 m (72 ft 2 in)
- Draft: 4.50 m (14 ft 9 in)
- Ramps: Stern vehicle loading ramp
- Installed power: 2 × Mirrlees 16MB275 diesel engines (total 8,973 kW)
- Propulsion: 2 × controllable pitch propellers
- Speed: 19.0 knots (35.2 km/h; 21.9 mph) (service) / 21.0 knots (38.9 km/h; 24.2 mph) (max)
- Capacity: 1,220–1,403 passengers; 150–250 cars
- Crew: 36

Iolkos is a ferry belonging to the Greek shipping company Seajets. Built between 1995 and 1996 by Vernicos Shipyard in Greece, it has been sailing mainly on the Volos - Sporades route.

== Service ==
The ferry, delivered in June 1996 to the Greek company Valtetsi Shipping Corp. with the name Haroula, was however immediately renamed Supercat Haroula , later taking service in the same year on the routes between Piraeus and the Greek islands of the Aegean Sea under the banner of Goutos Lines.

On 12 November 1999 she was sold to Minoan Flying Dolphins Maritime SA and, renamed Express Haroula in 2000, she began service on the routes between Volos,Skiathos, Skopelos and Alonissos.

On 11 April 2005, with the acquisition of the shipping company by Hellenic Seaways, it was renamed Express Skiathos. On 30 September 2023 it collided with the quay during mooring maneuvers in Skiathos, suffering minor damage to the stern on the starboard side. On 1 April 2024 it was sold for approximately nine million euros to the Greek company 4Naver Shipholding Ltd and, renamed Iolkos , returned on 1 May to operate on its route under the banner of the new shipping company, Seajets.
