= Panagia Tinou (ship) =

British roll on roll off ferry

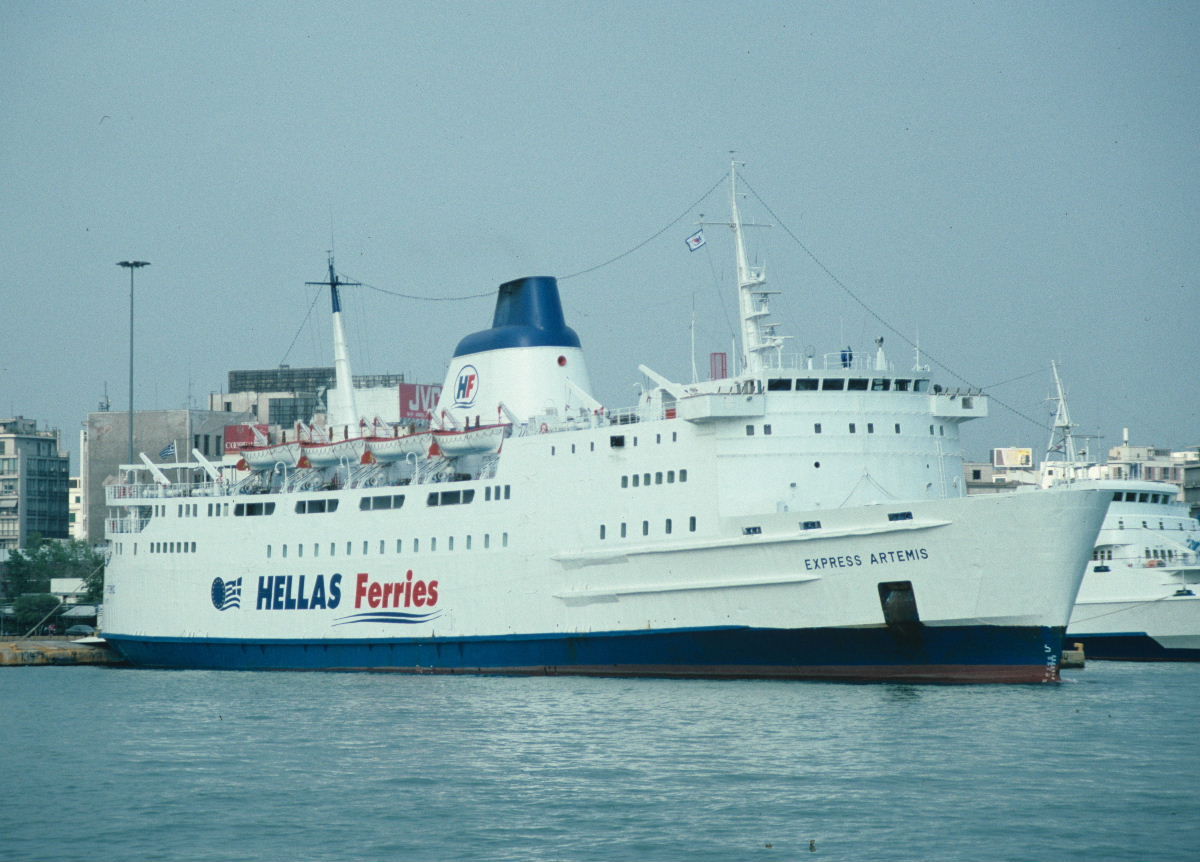
- Express Artemis at Piraeus in 2000.

History
- Name: Hengist (1972–1991); Stena Hengist (1991–1992); Romilda (1992–1993); Apollo Express 2 (1993–1996); Panagia Ekatontapiliani (1996–1999); Express Artemis (1999–2001); Panagia Ekatontapiliani (2001–2004); Agios Georgios (2004–2015); Panagia Tinou (2015–2017)
- Namesake: Hengist; Panagia Ekatontapiliani; Saint George (Agios Georgios); Panagia Tinou
- Owner: Sealink (1972–1992); GA Ferries (1992–1993); Ventouris Sea Lines (1993–1996); Agapitos Lines (1996–1999); Hellas Ferries (1999–2004); Ventouris Sea Lines (2004–2017)
- Operator: Sealink (1972–1992); GA Ferries (1992–1993); Ventouris Sea Lines (1993–1996); Agapitos Lines (1996–1999); Hellas Ferries (1999–2004); Ventouris Sea Lines (2004–2017)
- Port of registry: 1972–1992: London, United Kingdom; 1992–2016: Piraeus, Greece
- Builder: DCNS Arsenal de la Marine Shipyards
- Yard number: CF1
- Launched: 29 April 1972
- Completed: 1972
- Acquired: 6 June 1972
- Maiden voyage: 1972
- In service: 16 June 1972
- Out of service: 2015
- Identification: Call sign: SWXF; IMO number: 7205063; MMSI number: 237014500
- Fate: Sunk in Piraeus in 2016, scrapped in Aliağa, Turkey in 2017.

General characteristics
- Tonnage: 5,590 GRT
- Length: 110m
- Draught: 11.23m
- Speed: 19.5 knots

Panagia Tinou, also known as Agios Georgios, was a historic roll on roll off ferry launched in 1972 as MV Hengist. She was designed to operate across the English Channel and served the Folkestone-Boulogne route until 1991. In 1987, she was beached as a result of the great storm of 1987. She served with several operators before being sold to Vaggelis Ventouris in 2004 to serve the Greek islands.

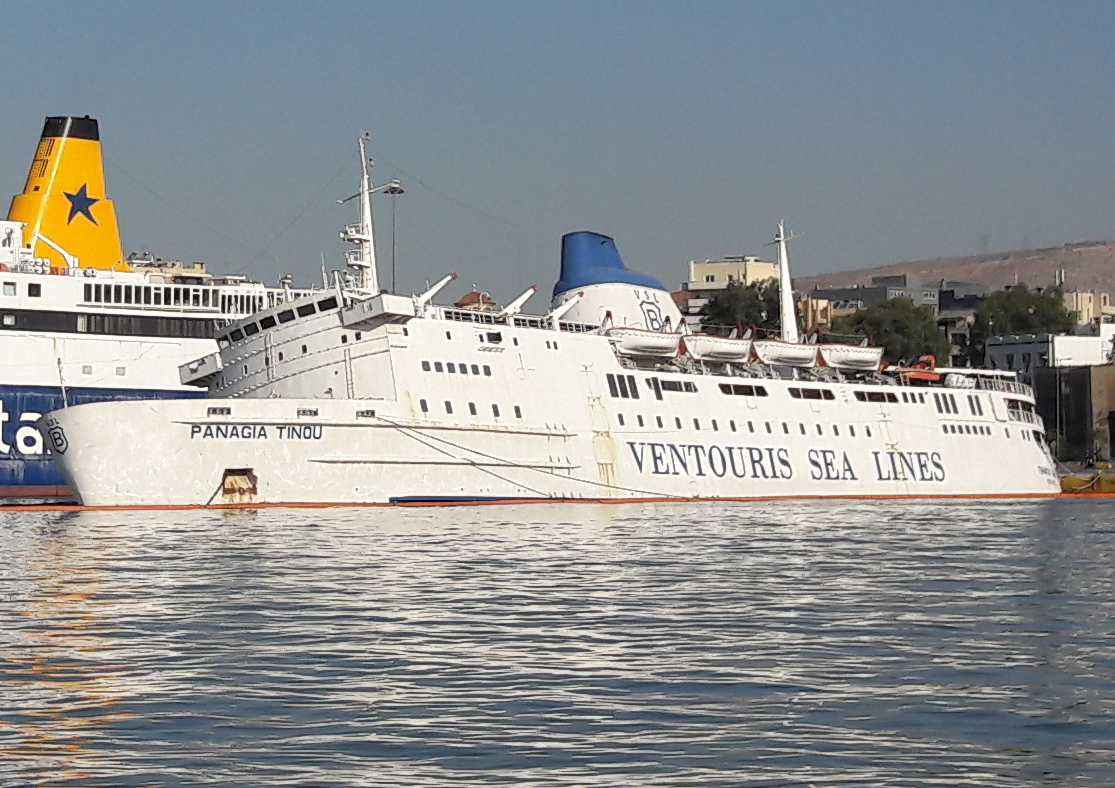
Panagia Tinou sunk in Piraeus.

In April 2016, she sank while docked in Piraeus. The ship was refloated in February 2017 and was scrapped in the same year.
