= Olympic Champion Jet =

High speed catamaran

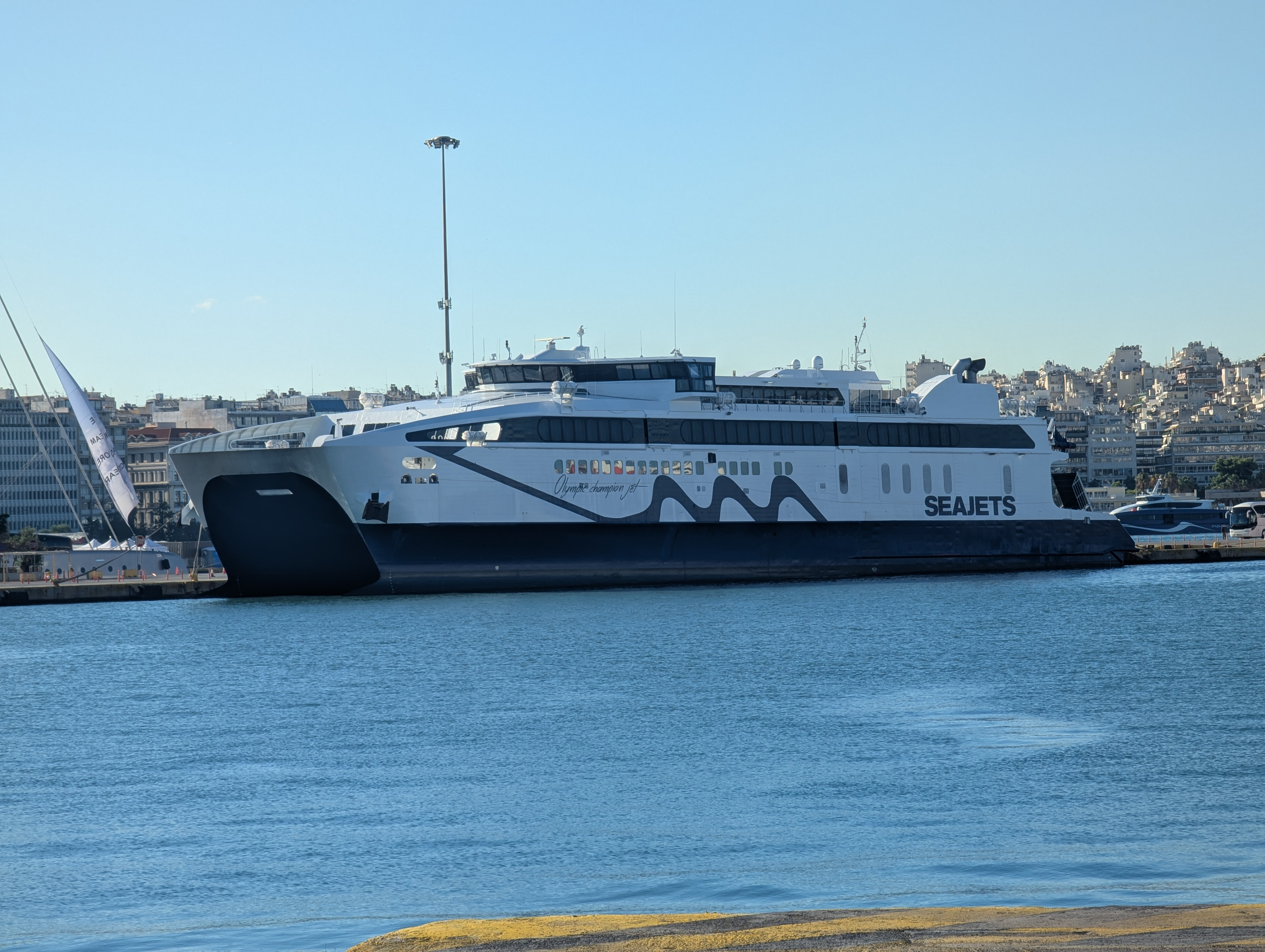
- Olympic Champion Jet at Piraeus

History
- Name: 2005–2015: Highspeed 5; 2016–2018: Highspeed 7; 2018–2024: Santorini Palace; 2024–present: Olympic Champion Jet
- Owner: 2018–present Minoan Lines
- Operator: 2005–2018: Hellenic Seaways; 2018–2024: Minoan Lines; 2024–present: Seajets
- Port of registry: 2005–2018: Piraeus, Greece; 2018–present: Heraklion, Greece
- Builder: Austal; Henderson, Western Australia
- Yard number: 285
- Launched: 20 March 2005
- Completed: 2005
- Maiden voyage: 2005
- In service: 2005
- Identification: IMO number: 9329095; Call sign: SYDM; MMSI number: 240348000
- Status: in service

General characteristics (as built)
- Class & type: Auto Express 85-class catamaran
- Tonnage: 4,913 GT
- Length: 85.0 m (278 ft 10 in)
- Beam: 21.2 m (69 ft 7 in)
- Draft: 3 m (9 ft 10 in)
- Depth: 6 m (19 ft 8 in)
- Installed power: 4 x Caterpillar 3618 diesel engines
- Propulsion: 4 × KaMeWa 112 s11 waterjets
- Speed: 39 knots (72 km/h; 45 mph)
- Capacity: 1,160 / 810 passengers (HS7 / HS5); 105 / 154 cars (HS7 / HS5)
- Crew: 26 / 24 (HS7 / HS5)

Olympic Champion Jet is an 85-metre (278 ft 10 in) high speed catamaran, built as Highspeed 5, later Highspeed 7, for Hellenic Seaways. She is now owned by Minoan Lines and ran for them as Santorini Palace. In 2024 she was chartered to Seajets and renamed Olympic Champion Jet.

== History ==
The vessel was launched on 20 March 2005 as Highspeed 5 by Austal at Henderson, Australia and completed later that year for the Greek ferry operator Hellenic Seaways. She entered service with Hellenic Seaways in July, initially sailing between Piraeus and the Cyclades, and subsequently between Heraklion and central Cyclades.

=== Fire incident ===
On 23 March 2015, while Highspeed 5 was docked at Drapetsona for modification works and inspections, a fire broke out on board that resulted in the death of the chief electrician and the destruction of her bridge and upper decks. In September 2015, the vessel was towed to Fincantieri shipyards in Trieste, where she underwent extensive repairs. During them, the upper car deck was substituted with a passenger lounge, increasing her capacity to 1,160 passengers. After being repaired, she was renamed Highspeed 7 and resumed her Heraklion – Cyclades service in mid-June 2016.

=== Continued service ===
In early summer 2018, Highspeed 7 was transferred to Minoan Lines as part of the arrangements in the sale of Minoan's stake in Hellenic Seaways to Attica Group. She was renamed Santorini Palace and painted in Minoan's colors on 13 June. It was reported in January 2024 that the ferry has been taken on charter by Seajets on their Heraklion – Santorini – Naxos – Mykonos – Syros – Piraeus routes, and was renamed Olympic Champion Jet.

== Gallery ==
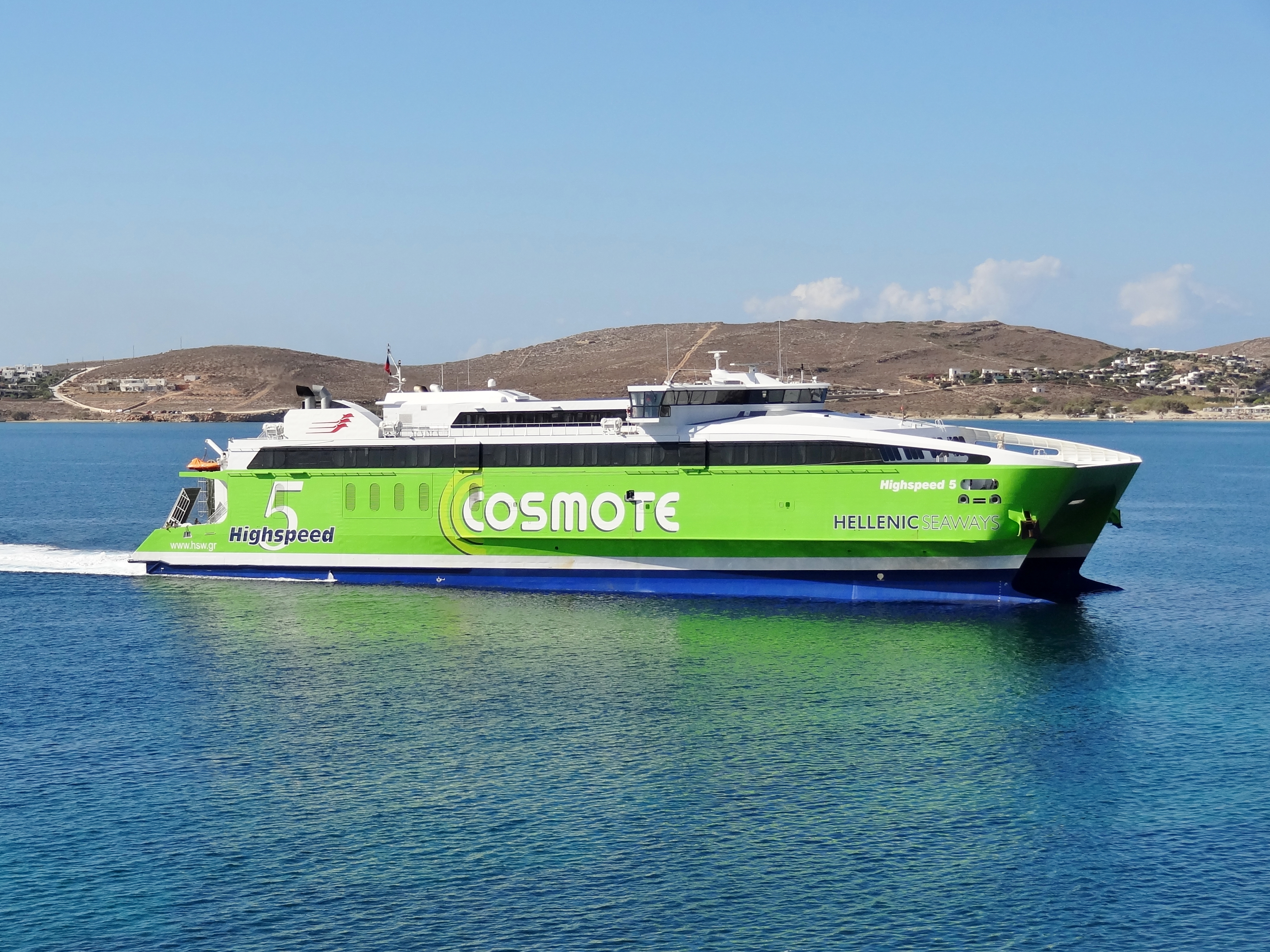
Highspeed 5 during a docking maneuver at Paros.

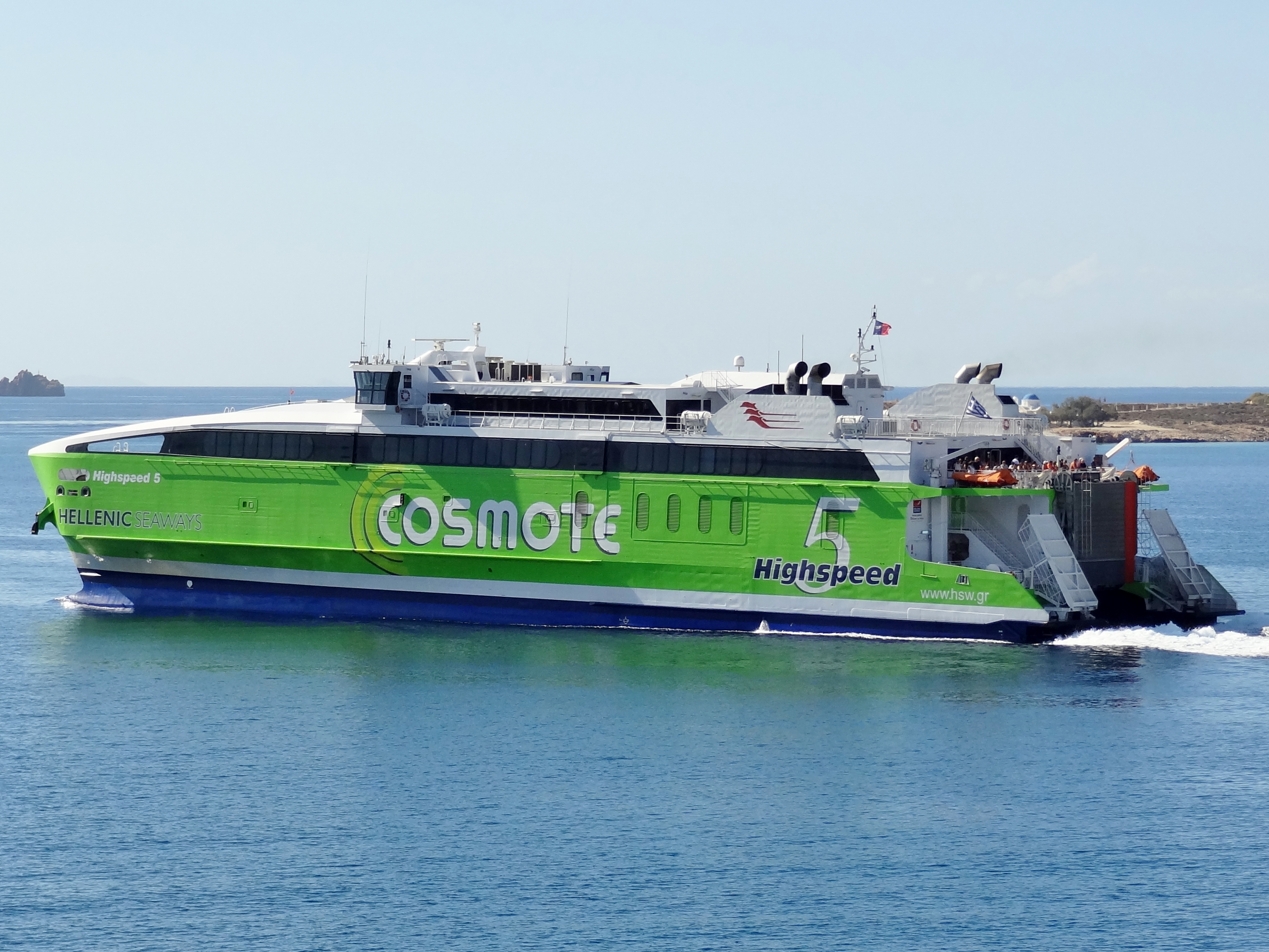
Highspeed 5 at Paros in 2009.

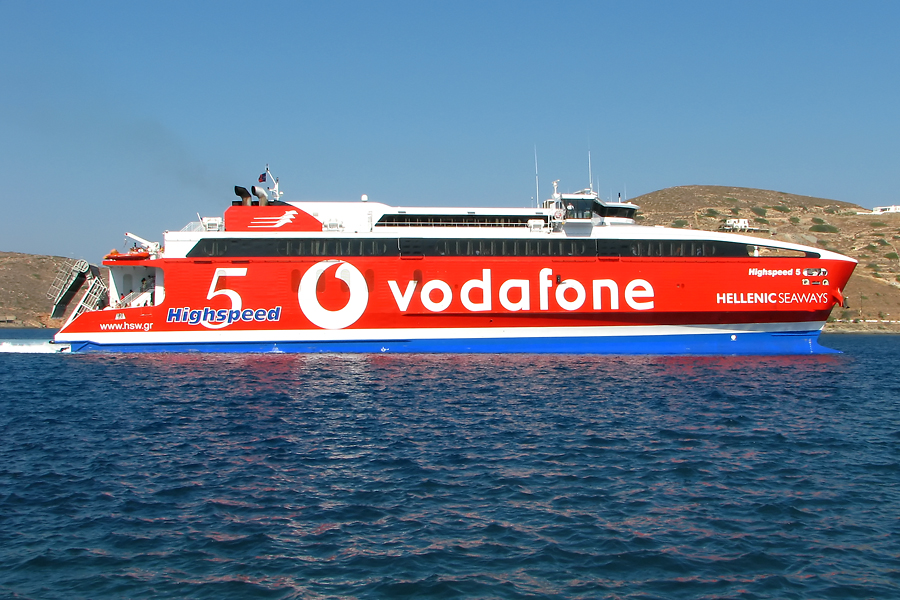
Highspeed 5 in older colors at Ios.

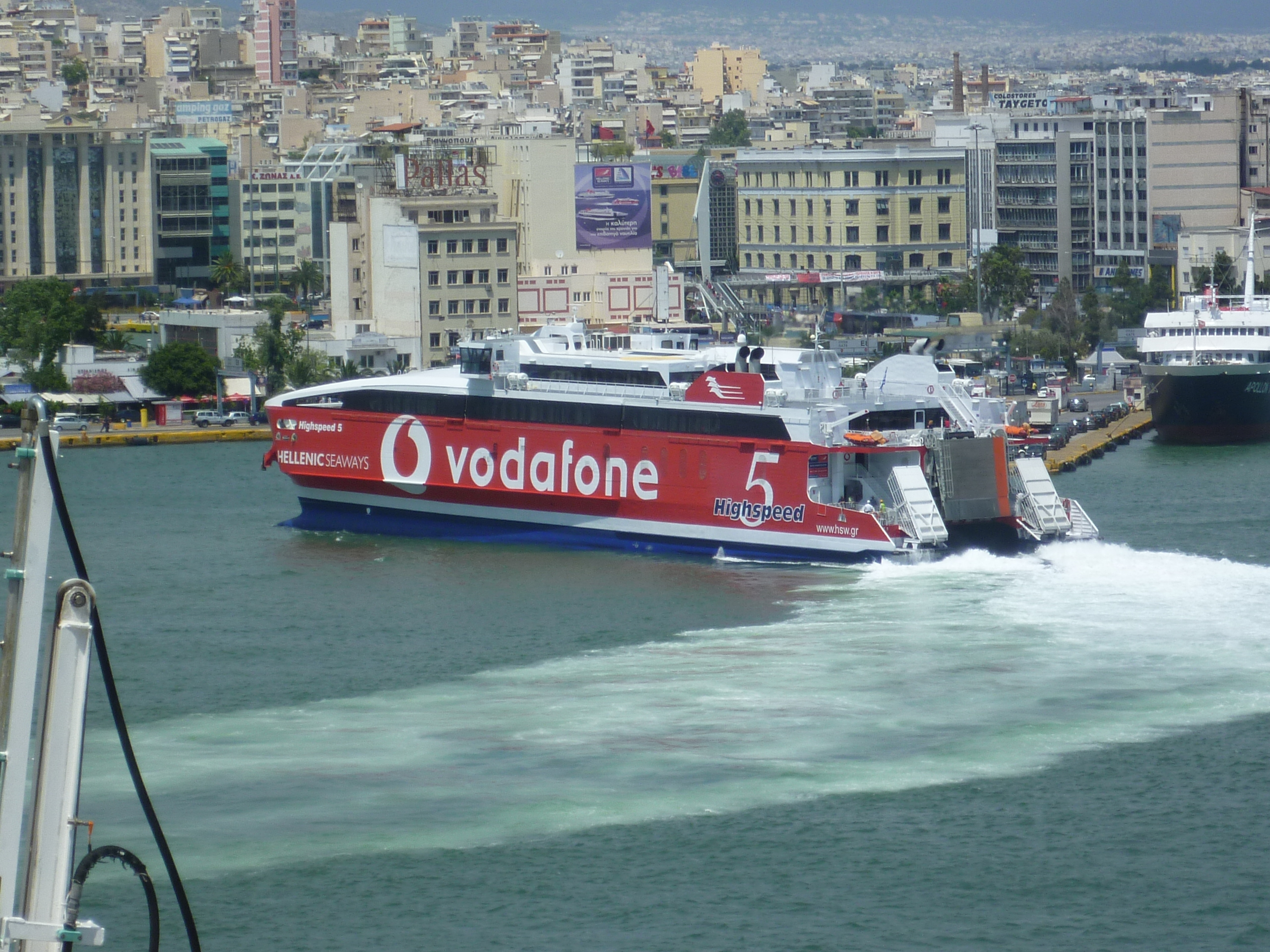
Highspeed 5 at Piraeus.

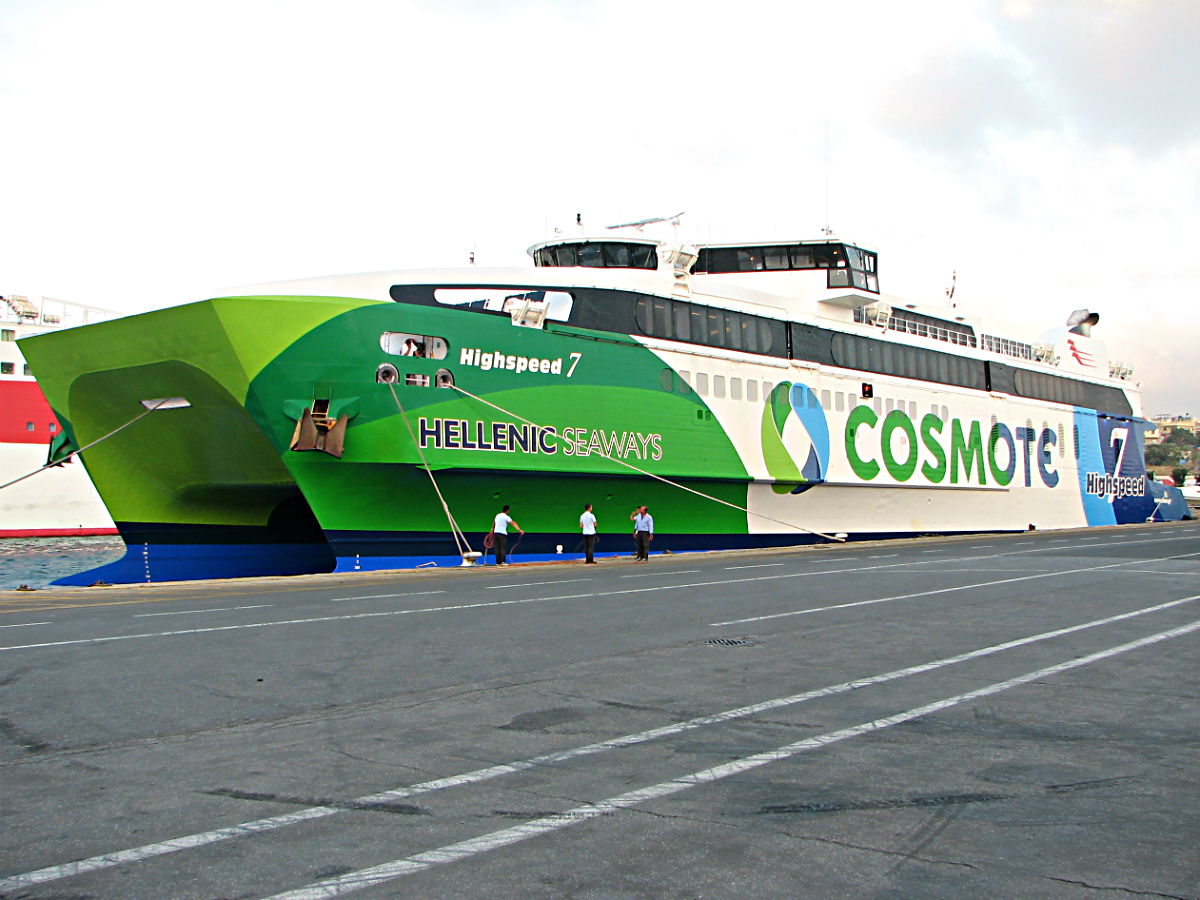
Highspeed 7 at Heraklion.

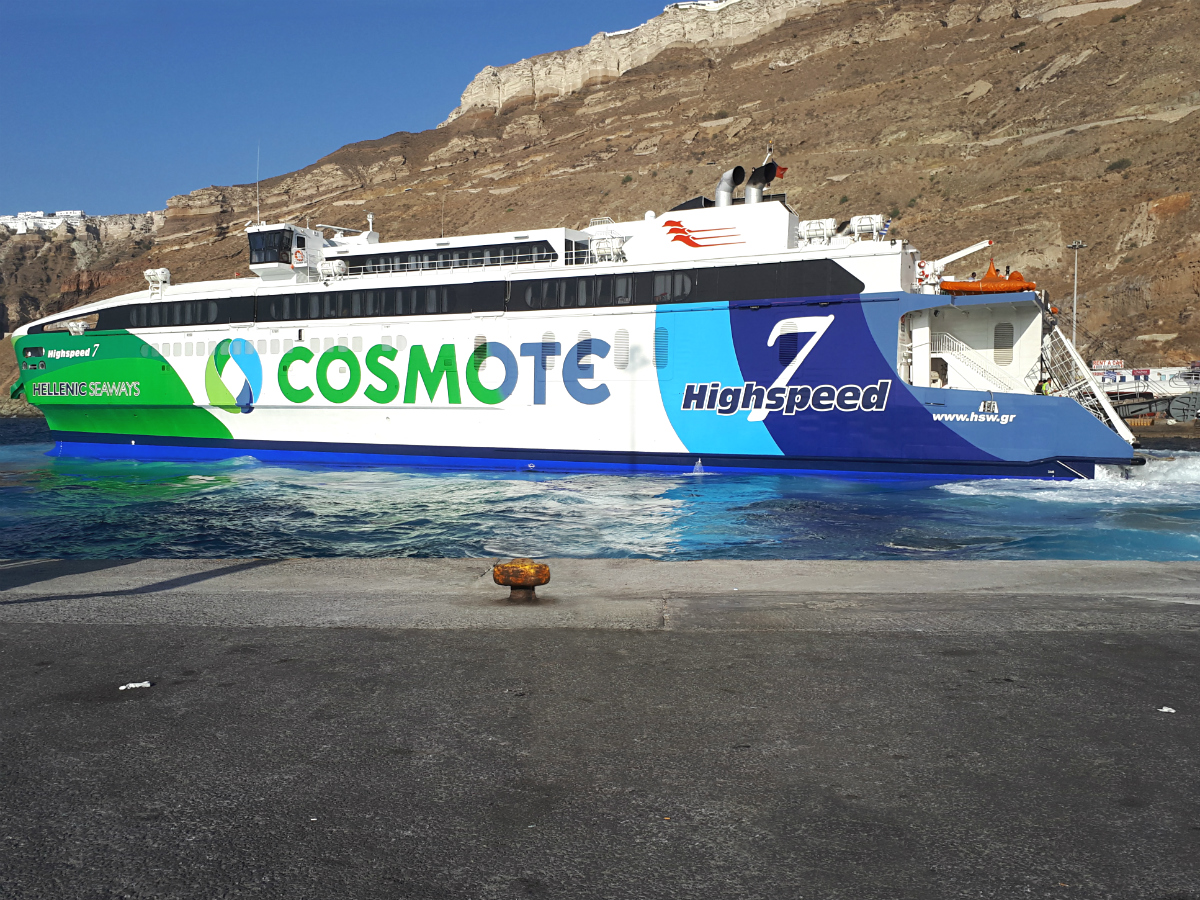
Highspeed 7 at Santorini.

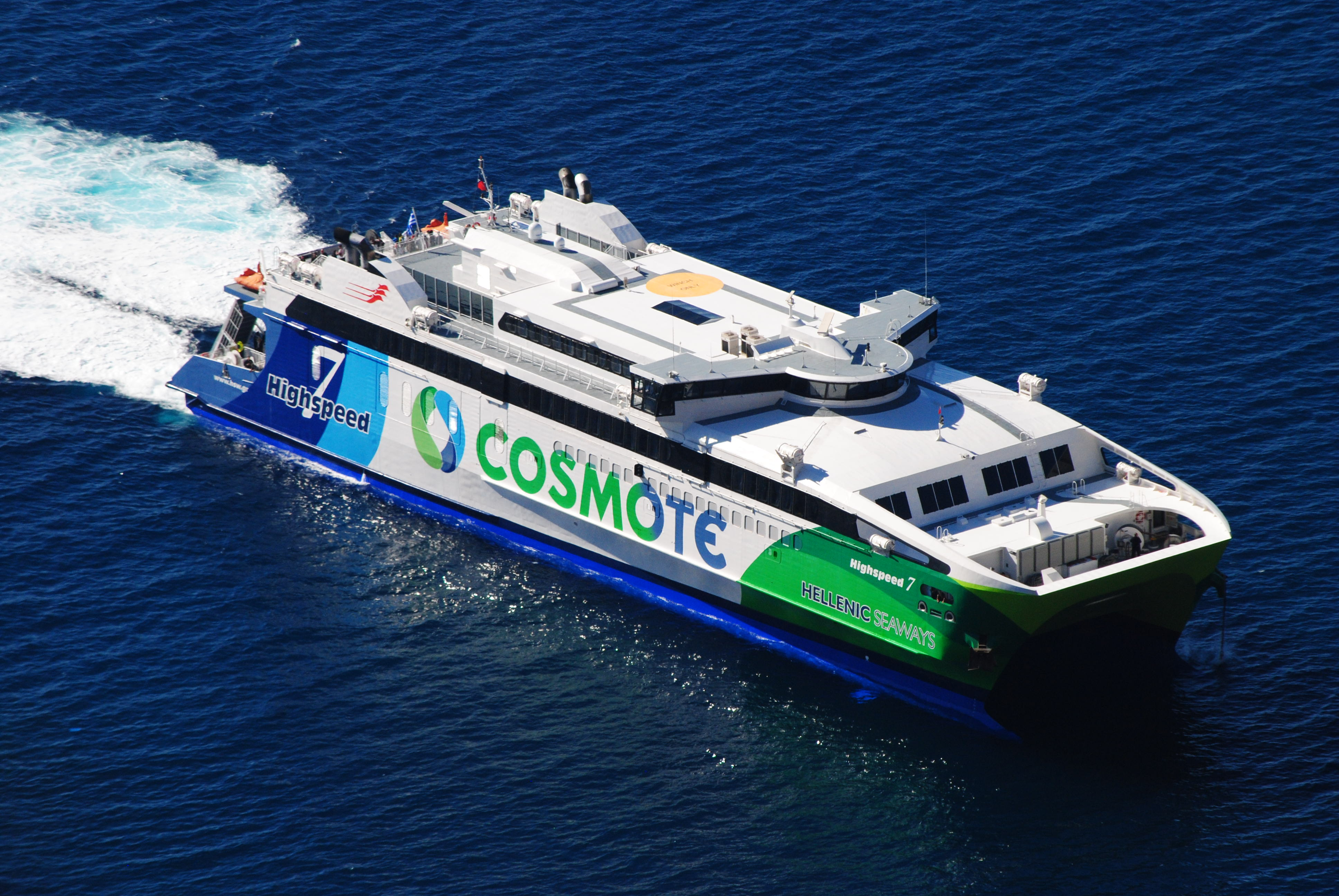
Highspeed 7

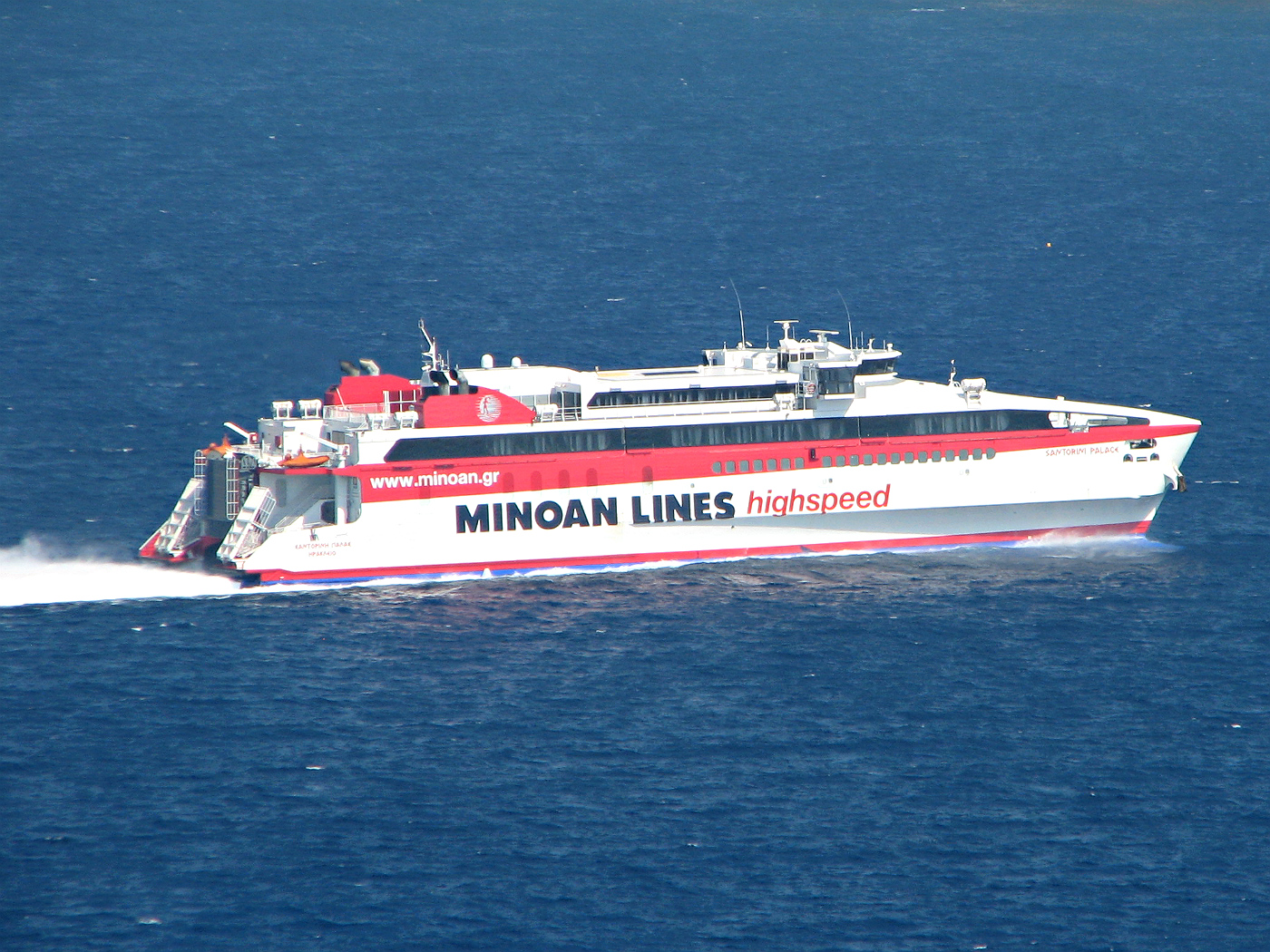
Santorini Palace at Santorini.
