= Agistri =

Greek island

Agistri Αγκίστρι
- Municipality
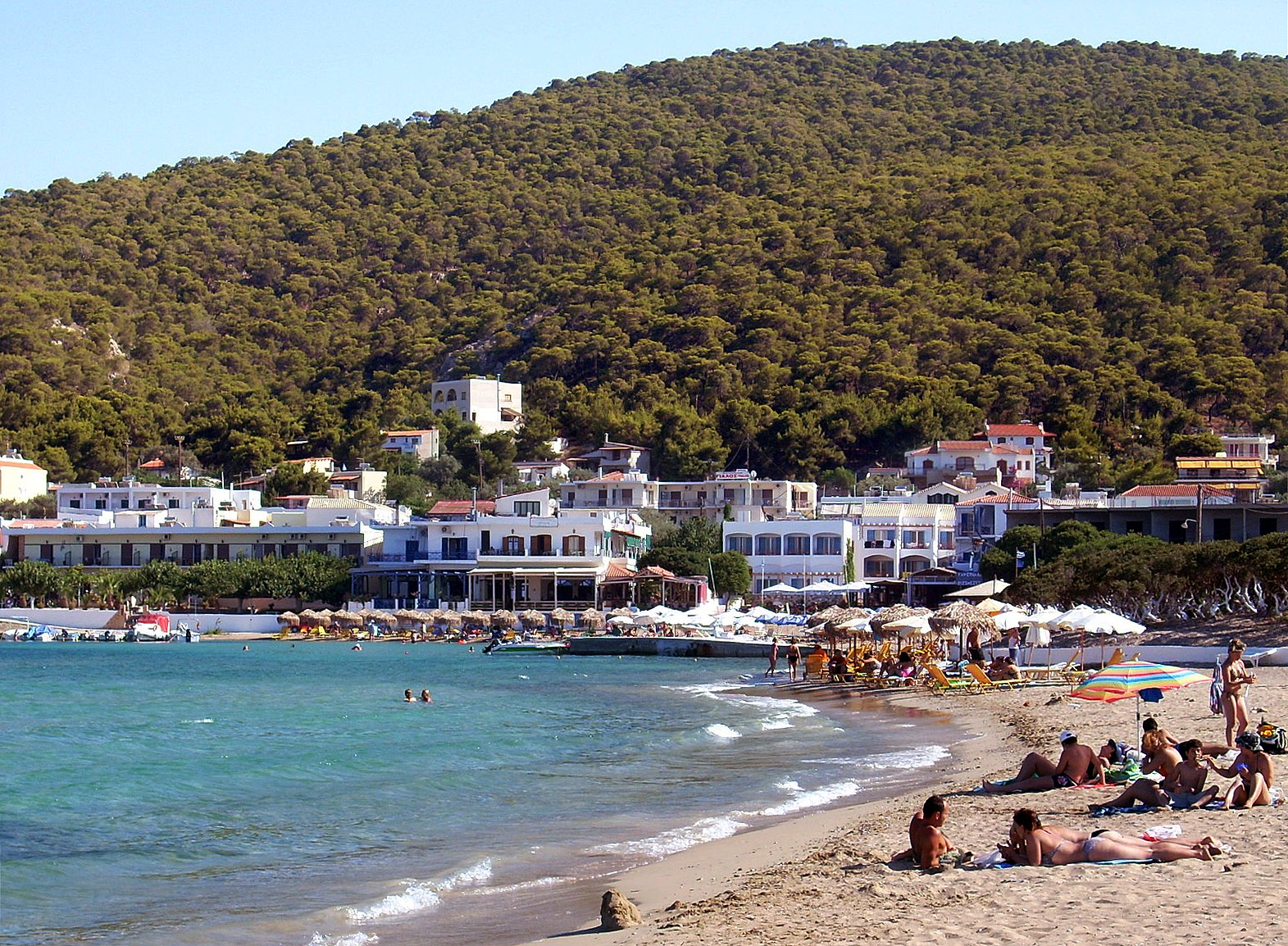
- Beach of Skala

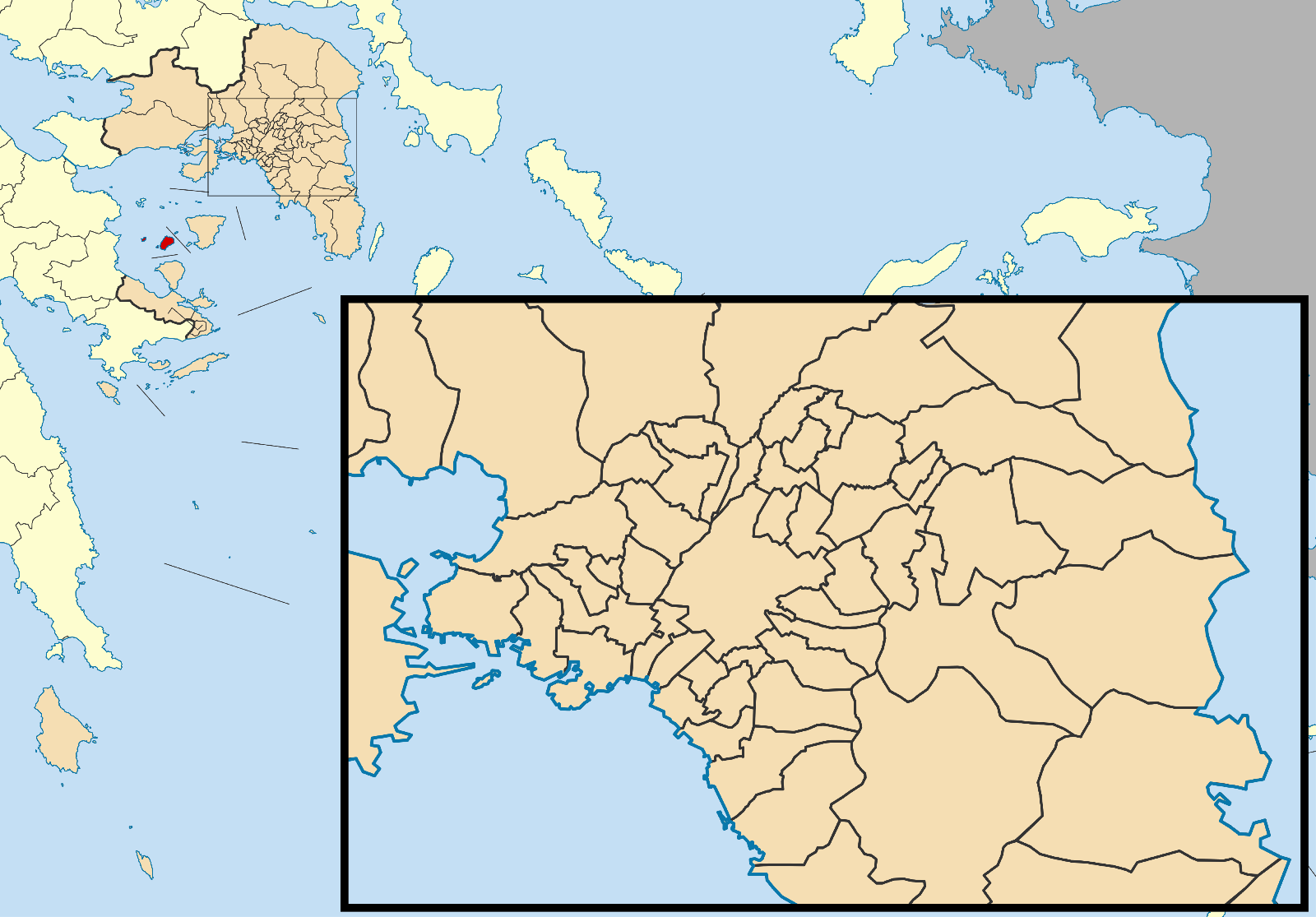

- Location within Greece
- Coordinates: 37.695°N 23.350°E
- Country: Greece
- Administrative region: Attica
- Regional unit: Islands

Government
  - Mayor: Dimitrios Anastasiou (since 2023)

Area
  - Municipality: 13.37 km^{2} (5.16 sq mi)

Population (2021)
  - Municipality: 1,131
  - Density: 84.59/km^{2} (219.1/sq mi)
- Time zone: UTC+2 (EET)
  - Summer (DST): UTC+3 (EEST)
- Postal code: 180 11
- Area code: 22970
- Vehicle registration: Z
- Website: agistri-island.gr (EN)

Agistri, also Angistri or Agkistri (Greek: Αγκίστρι [aɲˈɟistɾi ~ aˈɟistɾi], English: "fishing hook"), is a small populated island and municipality in the Saronic Gulf in the Islands regional unit, Greece.

== Settlements ==
On this island with a land area of 13.367 km^{2} (5.161 sq mi), there are only three settlements—Milos (Megalochori), Skala and Limenaria. Milos is the main village where the majority of the population of the island lives. Skala is a twenty-minute walk from Milos along the coastal road. Skala is where most of the tourist facilities and hotels are. Limenaria is a very small village on the other side of the island with very little tourism. The island's population is 1,131 inhabitants according to the 2021 Greek census.

== History ==
The island was settled by Arvanites likely starting in the late 17th century. The community still inhabits the island.

== Geography ==
Agistri is a pine-covered island in the Saronic Islands group.

Agistri is very close to the larger Saronic island of Aegina. The island can be reached from Aegina by a number of boats in just ten minutes. These boats include the Agistri Express and a number of small "water taxis". The island is also an hour's boat ride from the large Athenian port of Piraeus. In 2011 it was recognized as a "green island" by the Prefecture of Piraeus and the National Technical University of Athens.

== Flora and fauna ==
Agistri is home to a wide variety of plants such as wild cyclamen, thyme, caper bushes, and thistles. The center of the island is covered in Pine forest. It hosts a population of chukar partridges. The rocky eastern coast is used as a breeding place by swifts. Noteworthy is a population of peafowls, which have been introduced to the island and since become feral.

== Local economies ==
Agistri's primary industry is tourism. Both in Skala and Megalochori there are numerous hotels and restaurants. Local transport includes a bus and taxis. Popular beaches are Aponissos and Dragonera on the western coast, the beaches of Megalochori and Skala in the north, Mariza in the south, and Skliri and Halikiada in the east. Halikiada is popular for naturism. The island also has a long history of free camping, though it is no longer allowed to erect tents in the forest due to fire hazard. Agriculture also forms part of the island's economy.

On 18 September 2015, Wall Street investor Brian Kelly announced he would be investing in the Nxt-based platform Drachmae, which has as its aim the revitalisation of the local economy of the Greek Island Agistri.

== Gallery ==
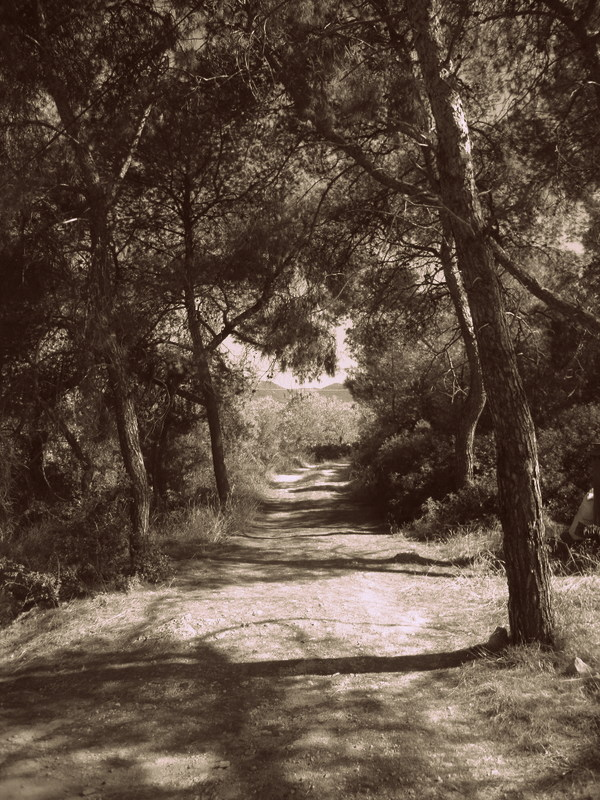
Pine forest with hiking trail

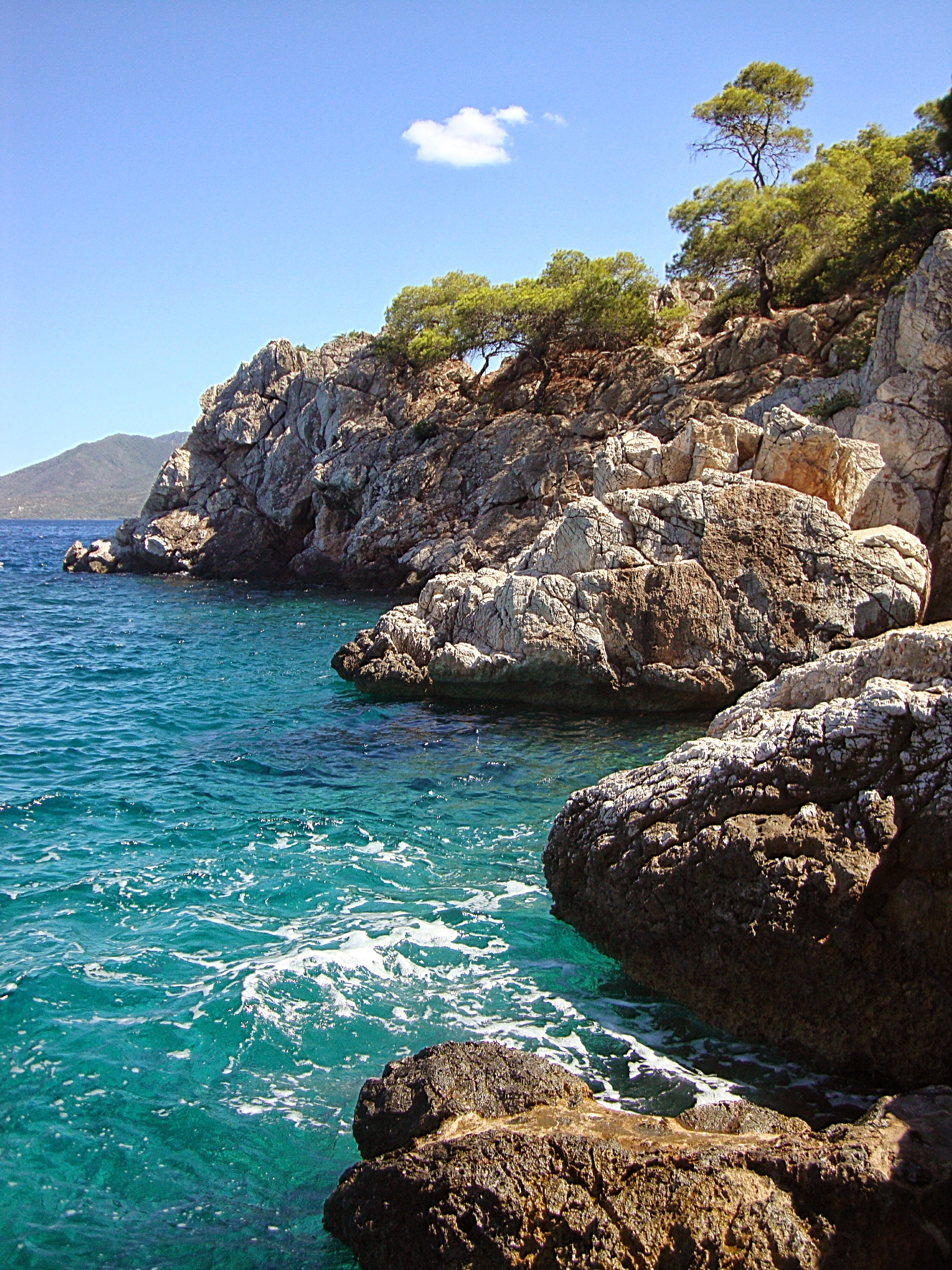
Near Mariza beach at the south eastern coast

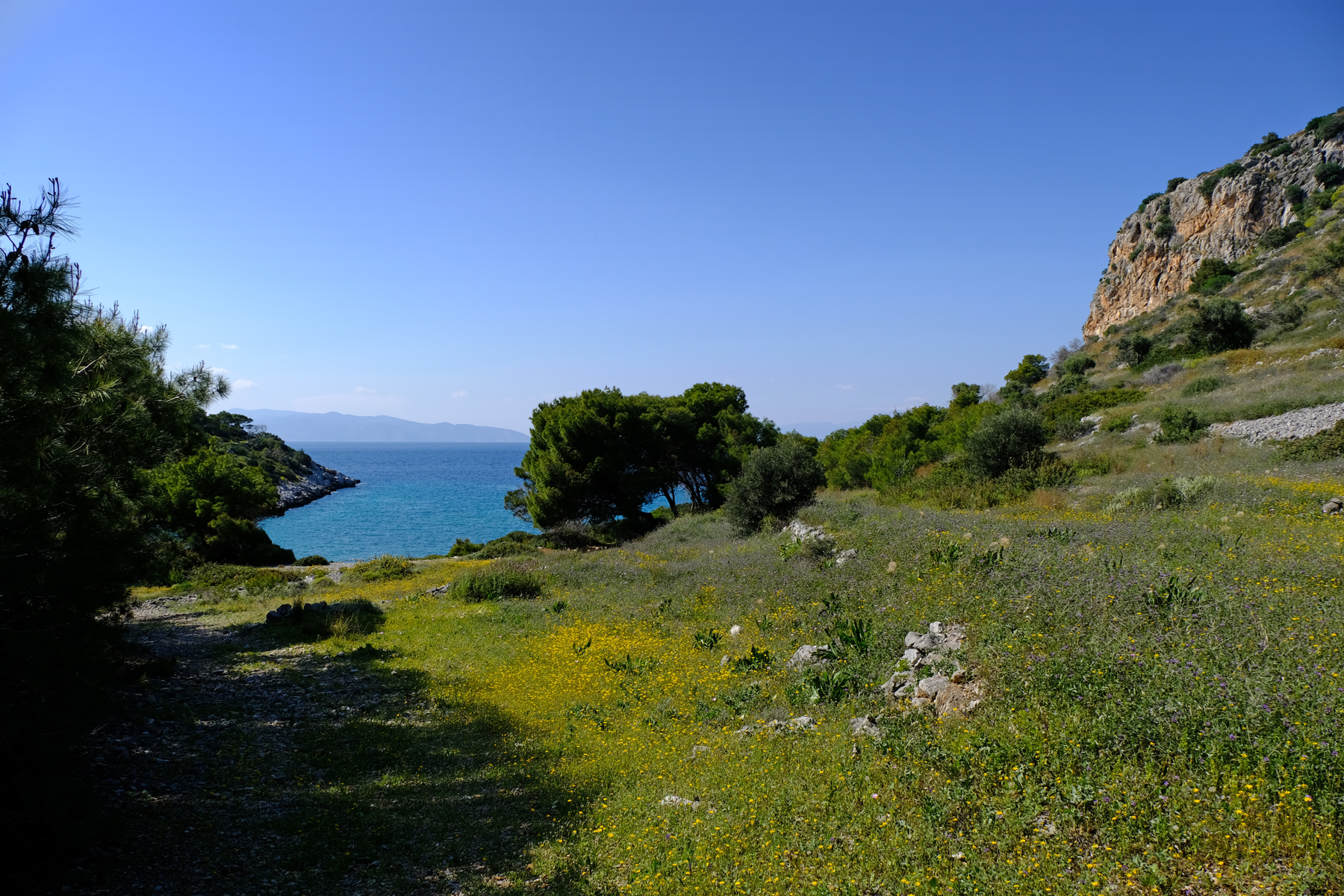
Bay at the western coast

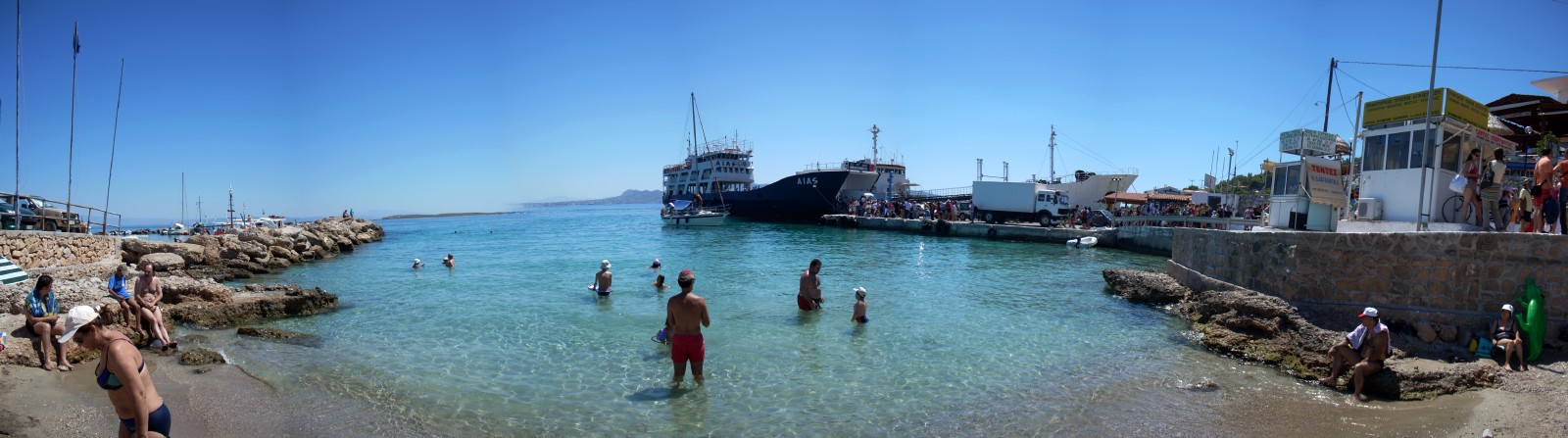
Panoramic image of the beach and harbor of Skala

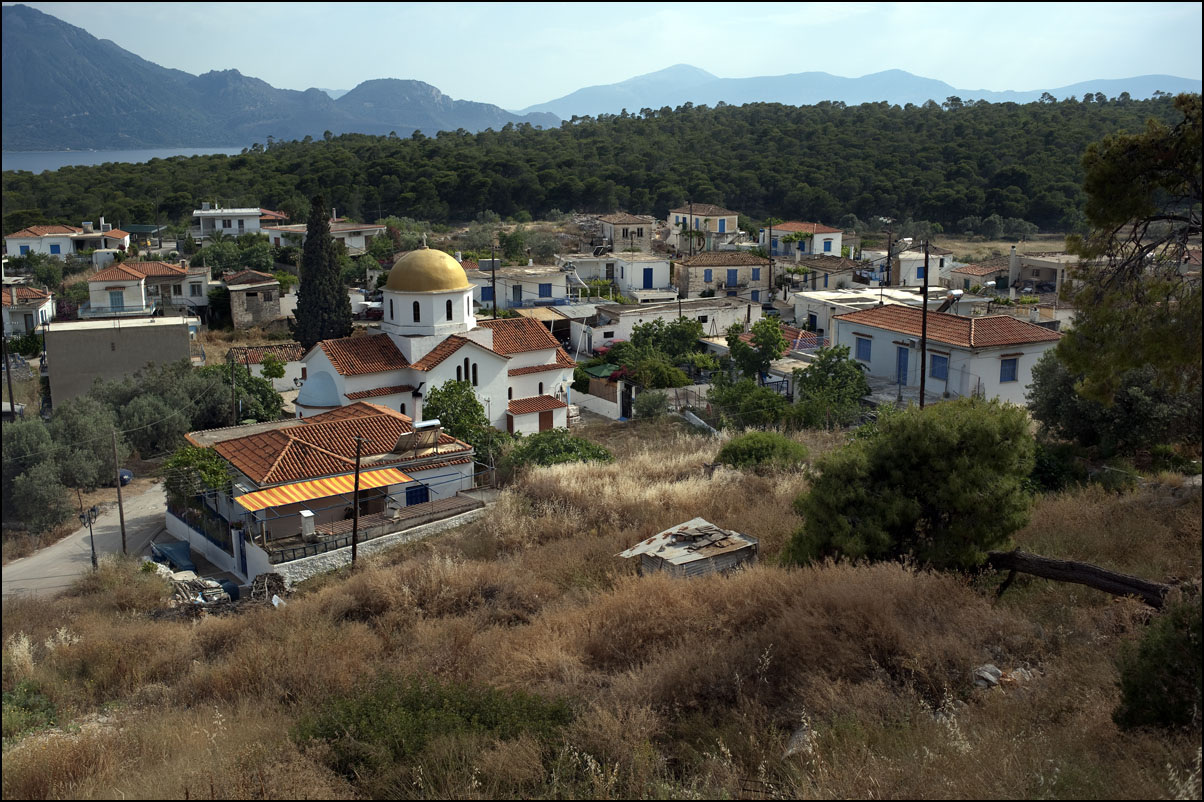
Village Limenaria

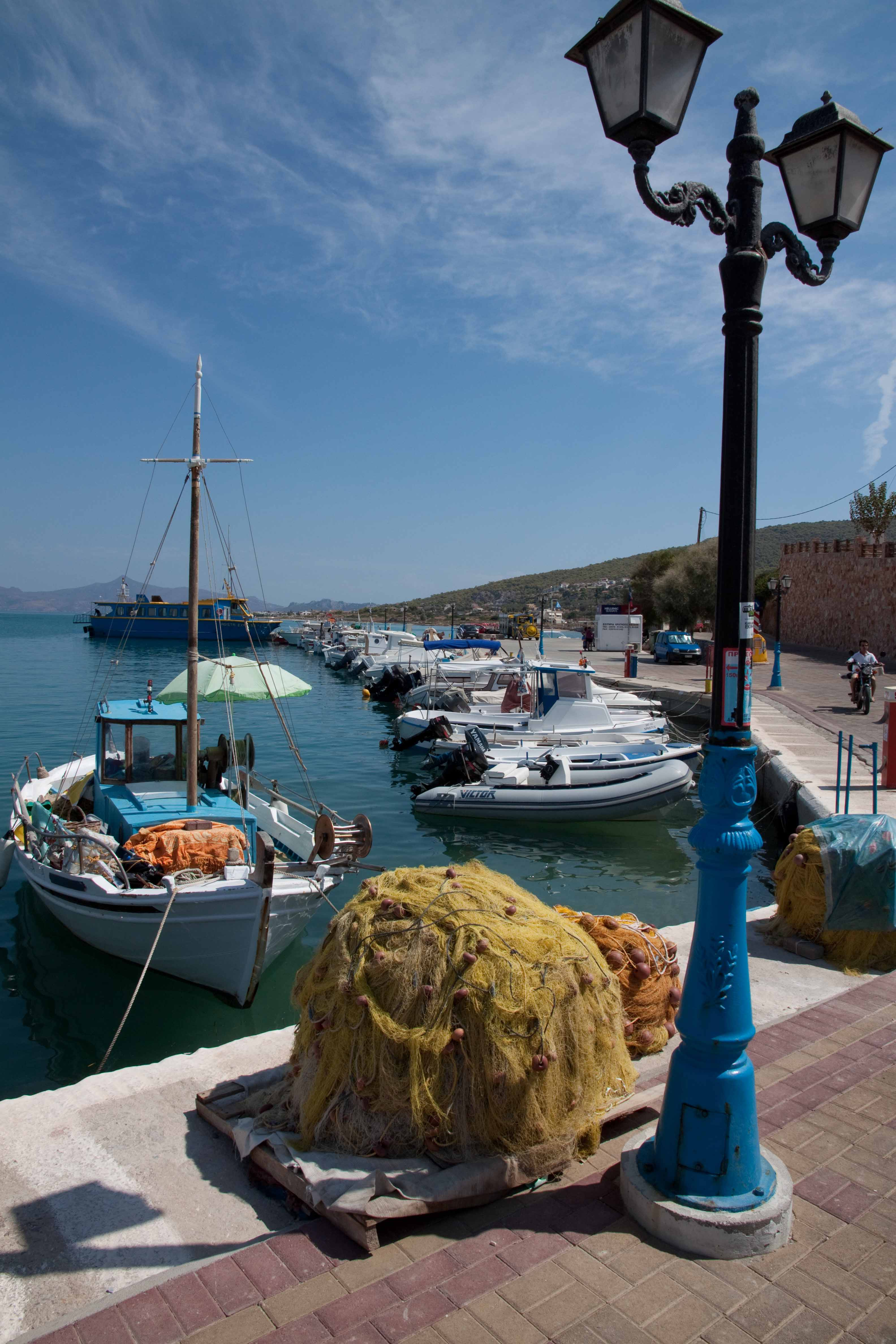
Fishing boat and nets at Megalochori

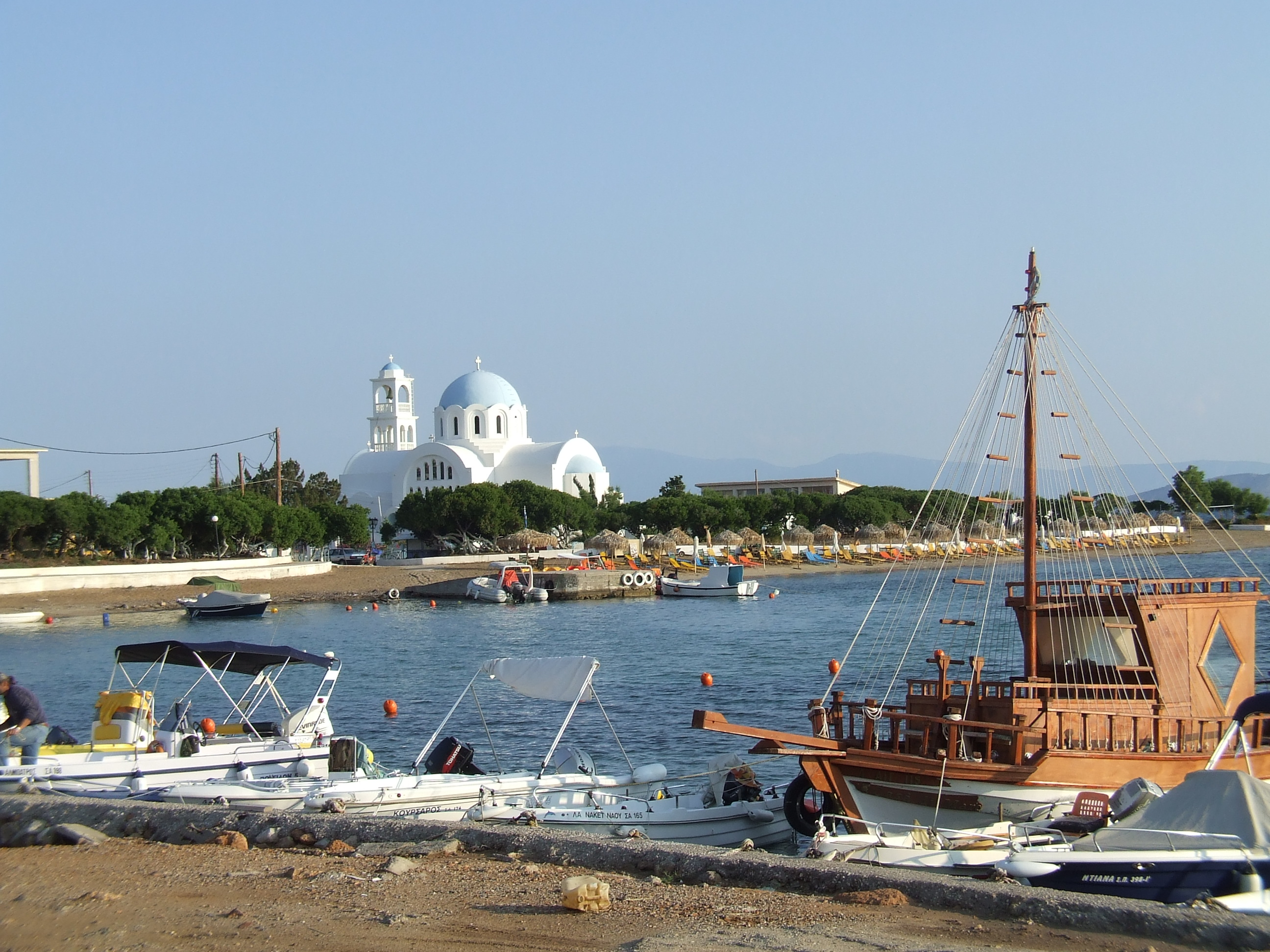
The Church of Agioi Anargyroi, Skala

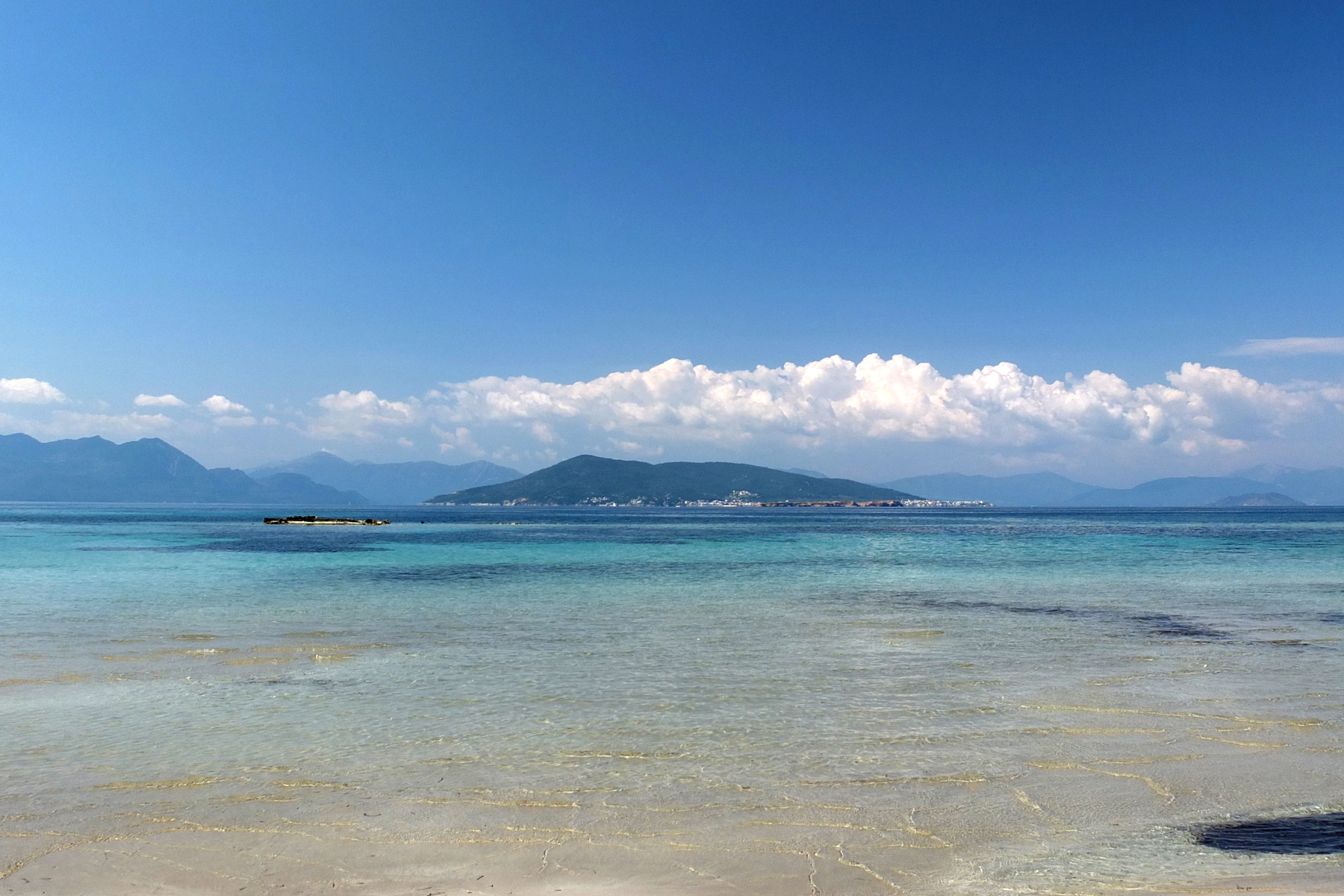
View from Aegina

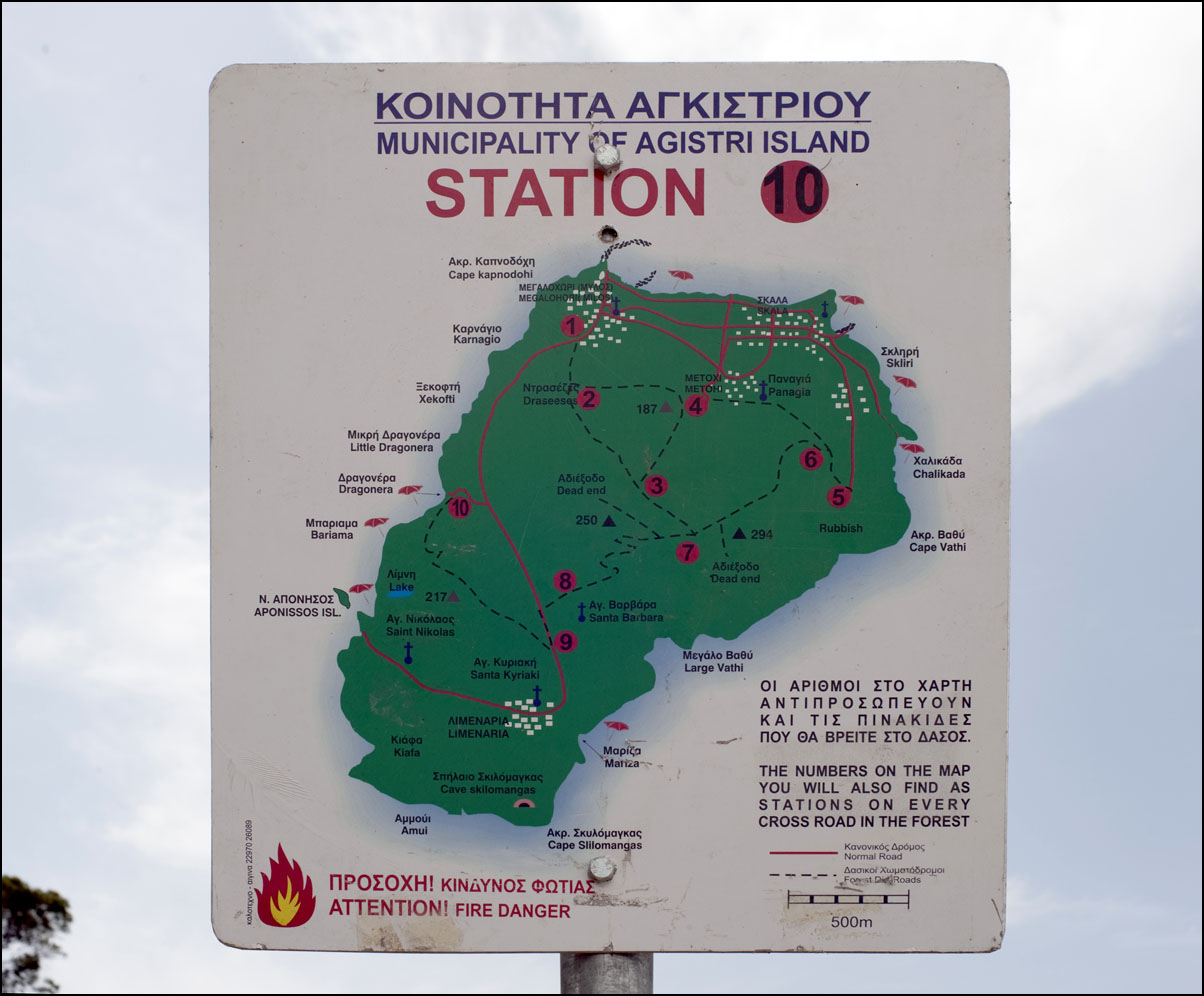
Map of Agistri on a forest fire warning sign

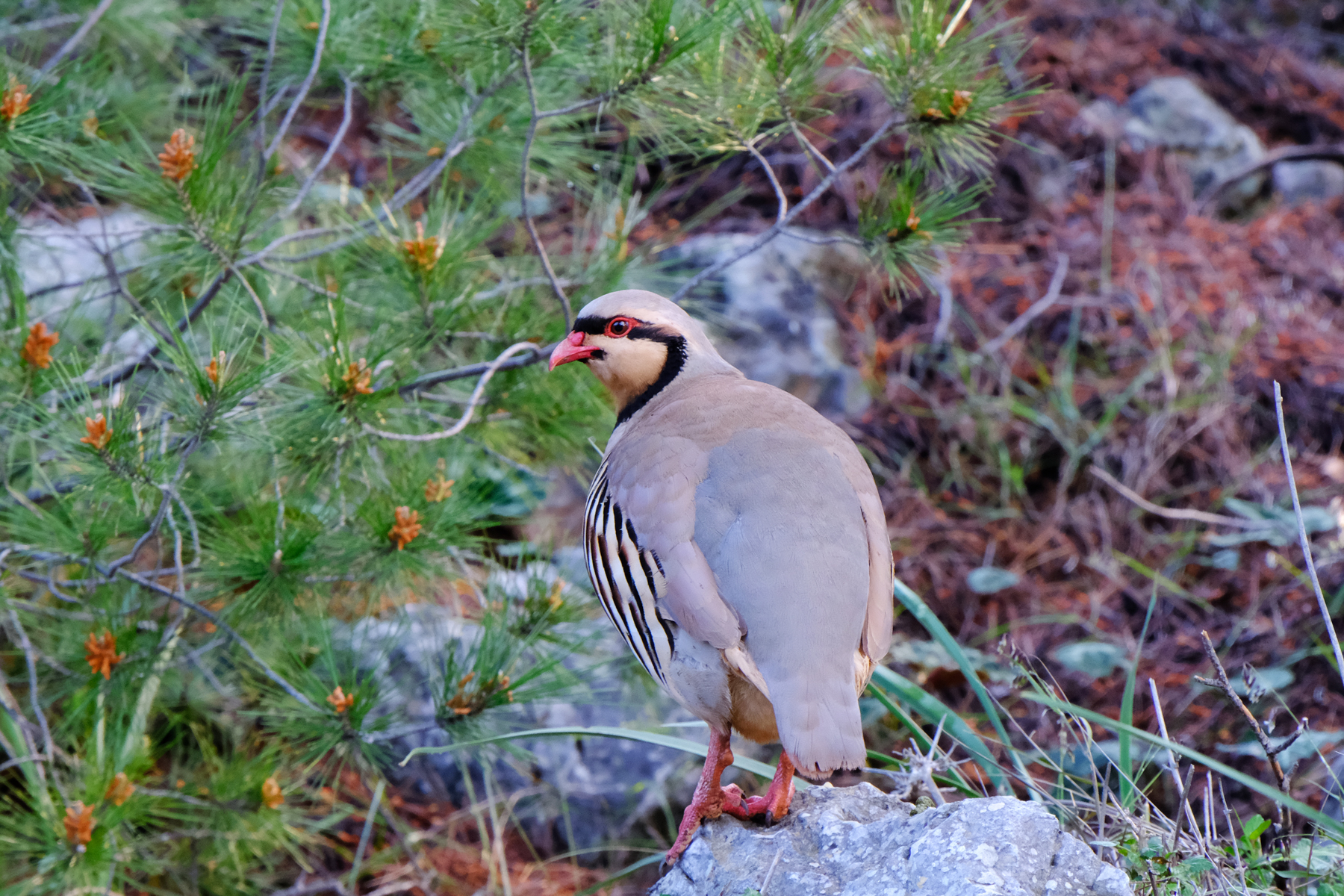
Chukar partridge

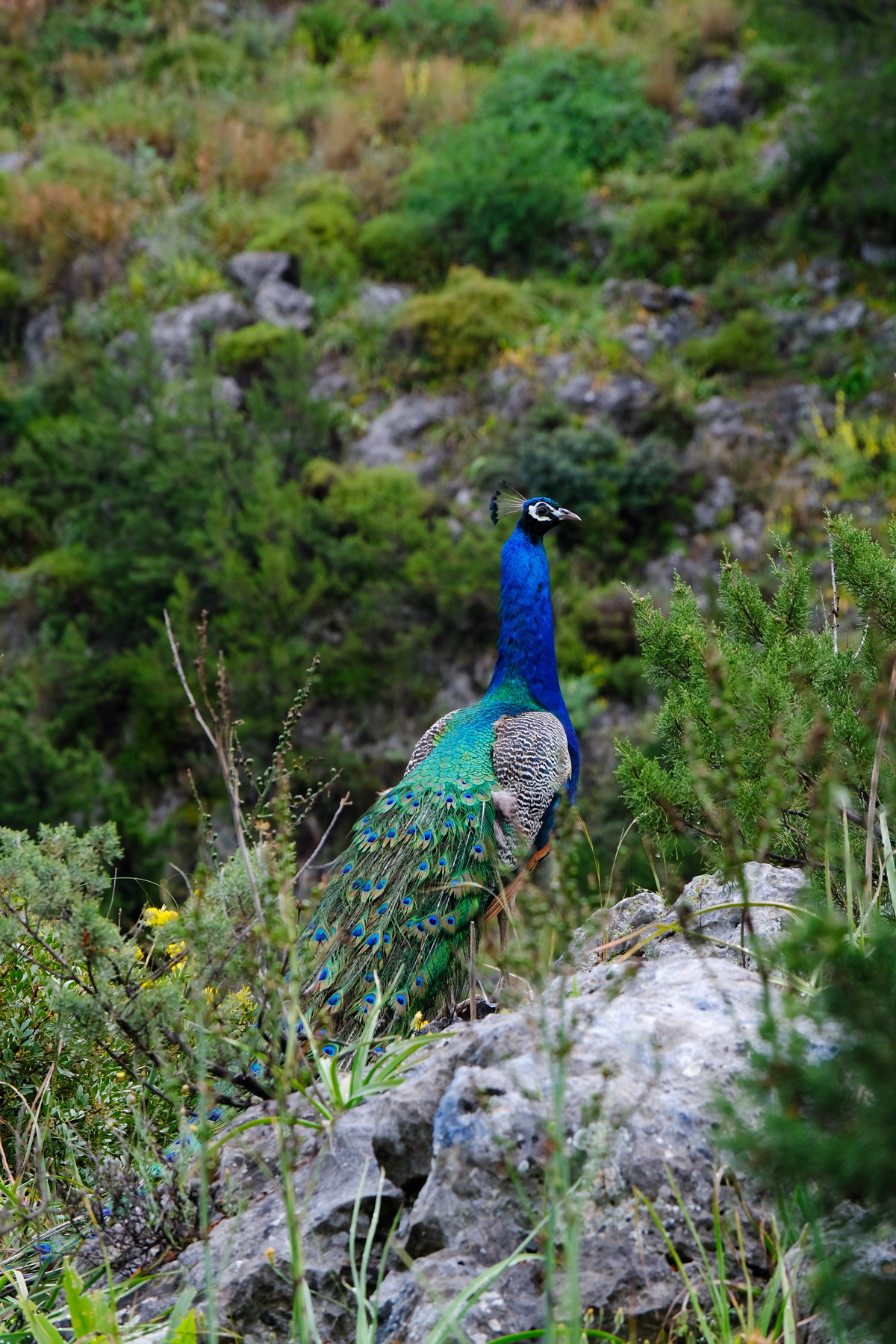
Peacock

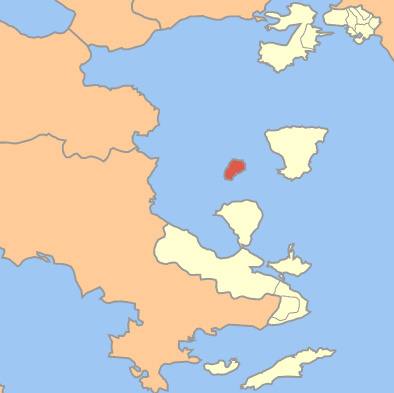
Agkistri island map
