= Fast Ferries (Greece) =

Greek ferry company

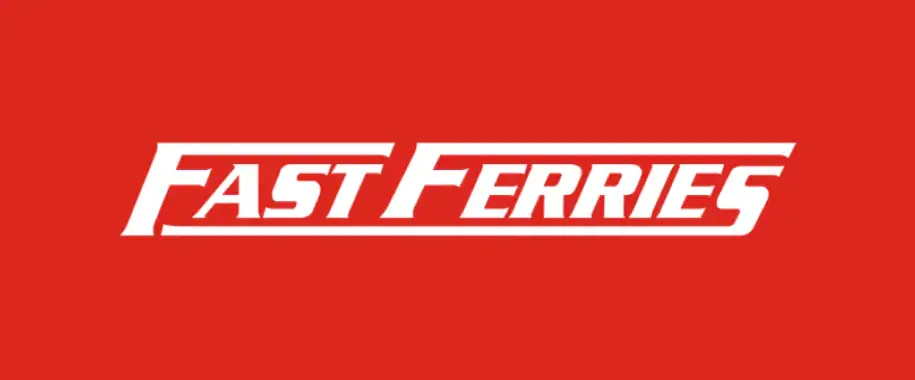
- Founded: 1989
- Headquarters: Piraeus, Athens, Greece
- Area served: Greece, Cyclades
- Services: Passenger transportation Freight transportation
- Website: www.fastferries.com.gr

Fast Ferries is a Greek ferry company operating from the Greek mainland to the Cyclades islands in the Aegean Sea. The company was founded in 1989 by Panagiotakis Bros. and currently operates a fleet of ro-ro ferries.

== Fleet ==
In a joint venture with Golden Star Ferries, the HSC Express high-speed craft was acquired in late 2018, expected to enter service in the summer of 2019. However, in May 2019, the venture was dissolved and the vessel was wholly acquired by Golden Star Ferries.

As of December 2024, Fast Ferries operates the following fleet of Conventional Ferries:

Ship	Flag	Built	Entered service	Gross tonnage	Length	Width	Passengers	Vehicles	Knots	Notes	Photos
Theologos P.	(Greece)	2000	2007	4.935 GT	118,1 m	21 m	1.154	300	22	ex Ferry Kochi	
Ekaterini P.	(Greece)	1990	2012	3.948 GT	121,5 m	18 m	1.127	240	21	ex Rokko Maru	
Fast Ferries Andros	(Greece)	1989	2015	4.682 GT	115 m	21 m	1.200	280	20	ex Eptanisos, Choonhyang, Shinko Maru	
Dionisios Solomos	(Greece)	1990	2024	4.530 GT	121,5 m	21 m	1.050	360	19	ex Royal Kawanoe	
Adamantios Korais	(Greece)	1987	2025	8.324 GT	100 m	17 m	1.040	350	18,3	ex Kyushu, Adallh, Visuva	

== Routes ==
- Rafina - Andros - Tinos - Mykonos - Naxos
- Piraeus - Kythnos - Serifos - Sifnos - Milos - Kimolos - Folegandros - Sikinos - Ios - Santorini
- Alexandroupoli - Samothrace - Lemnos - Agios Efstratios
