= Ekaterini P =

Japanese built ferry

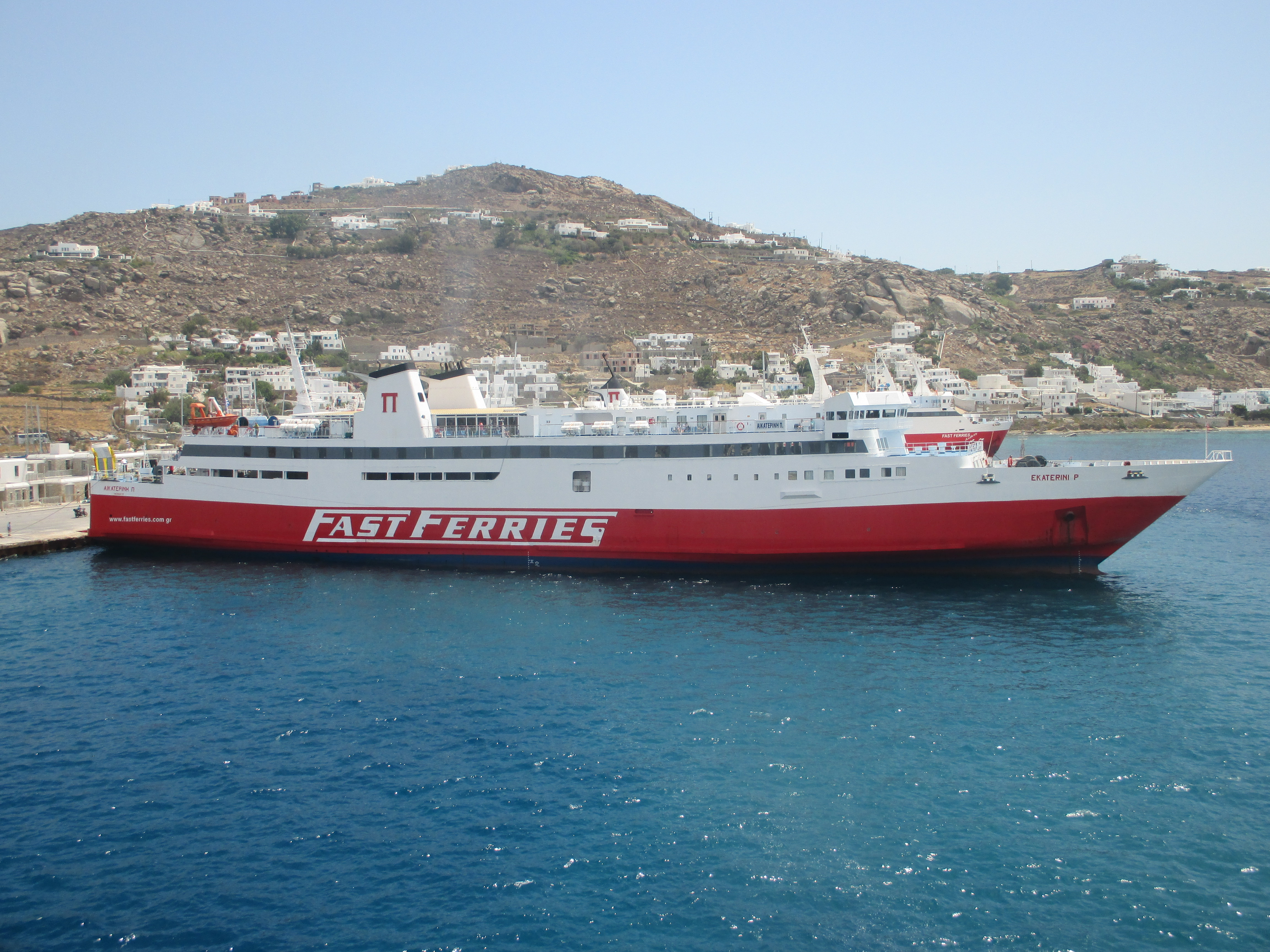
- Ekaterini P in Mykonos

History
- Name: (1990–1999): Rokkō Maru; (1999–present): Ekaterini P
- Owner: (1990–1999): Kansai Kisen Co.; (1999–present): Fast Ferries (Cyclades Fast Ferries Maritime)
- Operator: (1990–1999): Kansai Kisen; (1999–present): Fast Ferries
- Port of registry: (1990–1999): Japan; (1999–present): Piraeus, Greece
- Route: (Formerly): Igoumenitsa – Corfu; (Current): Rafina – Tinos – Mykonos – Naxos – Paros
- Builder: Japan
- Launched: 1990
- Completed: 1990
- Acquired: 1999
- Maiden voyage: 1990
- In service: 1990 (Japan); 2000 (Greece)
- Identification: IMO number: 9000443; Call sign: SYZJ; MMSI number: 237044600
- Status: In service
- Notes: Rebuilt and modified multiple times in Perama, Greece (including a major bow and stern remodeling in 2011/12).

General characteristics (following Greek conversions and 2011/12 reconstruction)
- Tonnage: 3,948 GT (formerly 3,250 GT); 1,300 DWT
- Length: 121.45 m (398 ft 5 in) (overall length following conversion); 116.50 m (382 ft 3 in) (original overall length)
- Beam: 18.00 m (59 ft 1 in)
- Draft: 4.51 m (14 ft 10 in)
- Depth: 11.65 m (38 ft 3 in)
- Ramps: 3 (1 bow ramp, 2 stern ramps)
- Installed power: 2 × MaK 8M32C diesel engines (installed 2020); Total power: 6,618 kW (8,875 hp); (Formerly 2 × Daihatsu 6DLM-40, 6,620 kW)
- Propulsion: Twin screw (2 × controllable-pitch propellers)
- Speed: 18.6 knots (service); 21.0 knots (max)
- Capacity: 1,127 passengers; 240 cars (or 75 cars and 38 trucks); 500 lane metres

Ekaterini P is a ferry operated by the Greek shipping company Fast Ferries, originally launched in 1990 as the Rokko Maru. Since 2012, it has been used on the route from Rafina to Andros, Tinos and Mykonos.

== Service ==
The ferry, launched on 9 February 1990 at the Shin Kurushima Dockyard Co. shipyard in Akitsu as Rokkō Maru, was delivered the following May to Kansai Kisen Kaisha of Japan. On 5 June she then entered service on the Kobe - Takamatsu route. In 1999, after nine years of uninterrupted service on the routes between Honshū and Takamatsu, she was sold to the Greek company Fast Ferries, operating in the Ionian Sea. The ferry was then moved to the Perama shipyard, where she underwent major refitting works, after which she was renamed Ekaterini P. and in 2000 she started service on the routes between Corfu and Igoumenitsa, setting the record for the largest ferry ever to have operated on that route.

At the end of the 2011 summer season, given the great success of its fleetmate Theologos P. in the Cyclades, the company decided to transfer all activities to the Aegean by early 2012. Following this, the ferry was moved to the shipyard in Perama, where it underwent major renovation works, during which numerous modifications were made to both the bow and the stern. Once the works were completed, on 12 July it began service on the routes between Rafina, Andros, Tinos and Mykonos, joining the Theologos P. In the summer seasons 2016 and 2018 it was used on the connections between Rafina, Tinos, Mykonos and Naxos.

In early 2019, she suffered a serious engine failure during her stopover in Rafina, which forced the company to do without the ferry for the summer season. After being repaired in Perama in 2020, she returned to service in 2021 on the routes between Rafina, Tinos, Mykonos, Naxos and Koufonisia. In 2023, the stopover in Koufonisia was discontinued. On 2 June 2023 it was rammed by Champion Jet 1 in Tinos, suffering minor damage.

== Accidents and Incidents ==
=== 2023 collision with Champion Jet 1 ===
On June 2, 2023, while Ekaterini P was docked at the port of Tinos with 217 passengers on board preparing for its departure to Rafina, the vessel was involved in a minor collision with the high-speed catamaran Champion Jet 1.The Cypriot-flagged catamaran, carrying 686 passengers from Rafina, struck the bow of the stationary Ekaterini P while attempting to execute its docking maneuvers. Fortunately, neither vessel sustained severe structural damage, no injuries to passengers or crew were reported, and no marine pollution occurred in the harbor. Following a brief detention by the Tinos Port Authority for a physical inspection and the submission of certificates of class maintenance by their respective classification societies, both ships were cleared to resume their scheduled voyages.

==== 2023 multi-vessel allision ====
On September 9, 2023, during gale-force winds of 7 to 8 Beaufort at the port of Rafina, Ekaterini P was involved in a complex anchoring incident when the departing ferry Fast Ferries Andros accidentally dragged her anchor chain, pulling her toward the moored Superferry. To avoid a collision, Superferry executed an emergency departure with 481 passengers, leaving behind her left anchor and chain, while Ekaterini P and Fast Ferries Andros performed maneuvers that severed their mooring lines and ultimately caused Ekaterini P's left anchor chain to wrap tightly around Fast Ferries Andros's right propeller. During subsequent attempts to disentangle the vessels, the bow of Ekaterini P made minor contact with the stern of Fast Ferries Andros without causing a hull breach, after which Ekaterini P safely diverted under her own power to the port of Lavrion to disembark her 391 passengers and undergo a safety inspection, while Fast Ferries Andros remained temporarily immobilized outside Rafina assisted by tugs.
