= HSC Notre Dame =

High-speed passenger trimaran

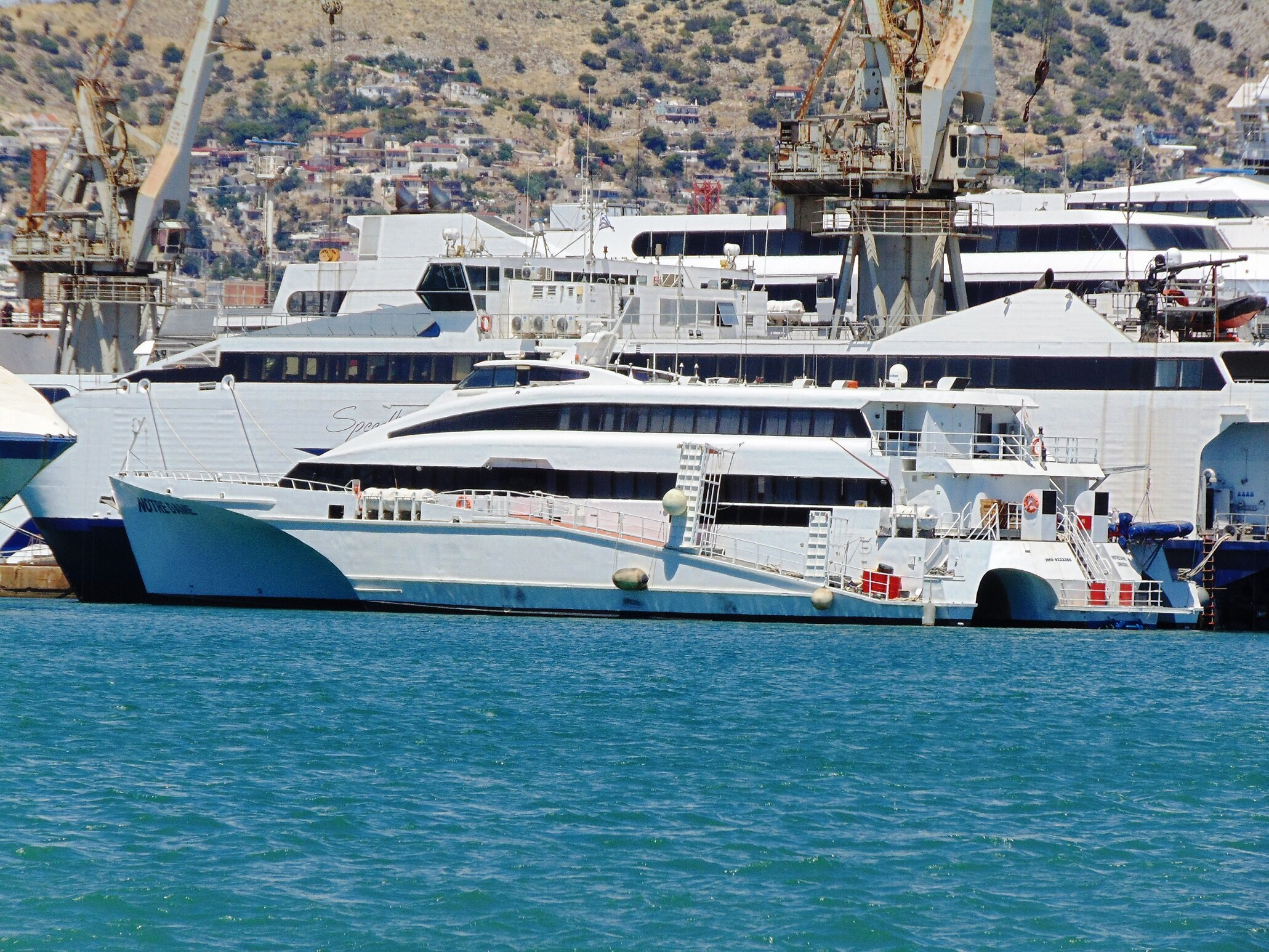
- Notre Dame in Salamis

History
- Name: (2001–2002): Triumphant; (2002–2007): Dolphin Ulsan; (2007–2015): Sea Flower; (2015–2017): Hd Ps-1; (2017): Krilo Eclipse; (2017–2021): Superspeed; (2021–2022): Superspeed Jet; (2022–2025): Supercat Jet 2; (2025–present): Notre Dame
- Owner: (2001–2002): White Rabbit Ltd.; (2002–2016): Ferry Ulsan; (2016–2017): Krilo.hr; (2017–2021): Golden Star Ferries; (2021–present): Seajets
- Operator: (2002–2015): Ferry Ulsan / Daezer Ferry; (2017): Krilo.hr; (2017–2021): Golden Star Ferries; (2021–present): Seajets
- Port of registry: (2001–2002): Bahamas; (2002–2015): Ulsan, South Korea; (2015–2017): Panama; (2017): Split, Croatia; (2017–2025): Piraeus, Greece; (2025–present): Limassol, Cyprus
- Route: Former: Rafina – Syros – Mykonos – Paros – Naxos; Former: Pohang – Ullungdo
- Ordered: 1999
- Builder: North West Bay Ships; Victoria, Australia
- Yard number: 9901
- Laid down: 22 November 1999
- Launched: 1 March 2001
- Completed: 20 March 2001
- Acquired: 2021
- Maiden voyage: 2001
- In service: 2001
- Identification: IMO number: 9223356; Call sign: 5BVW6; MMSI number: 210618000
- Status: Laid up

General characteristics
- Class & type: Trimaran High-Speed Passenger Craft
- Tonnage: 853 GT; 269 DWT
- Length: 52.14 m (171 ft 1 in)
- Beam: 15.30 m (50 ft 2 in)
- Height: 5.50 m (18 ft 1 in)
- Draft: 1.32 m (4 ft 4 in)
- Decks: 2
- Ramps: Passenger boarding ramps
- Installed power: 3 × MTU 16V 4000 M70 diesel engines (total 3,480 kW)
- Propulsion: 3 × Waterjets
- Speed: 35.0 knots (64.8 km/h; 40.3 mph) (service) 40.0 knots (74.1 km/h; 46.0 mph) (max)
- Capacity: 400 passengers
- Crew: 12

Notre Dame is a 52-metre (171 ft) high-speed trimaran passenger ferry. Built in North Victoria, Australia, in 2001 as Triumphant, the unique trimaran spent over a decade in South Korea running inter-island routes as Dolphin Ulsan and Sea Flower. After a brief period in Croatia as Krilo Eclipse, she was acquired by Greek operator Golden Star Ferries in 2017, extensively refitted, and renamed Superspeed to serve fast routes connecting Rafina and the Cyclades. Following her transfer to Seajets, she was renamed Notre Dame in 2025.

== Service ==
The trimaran, the first purpose-built for passenger transport, was launched on 1 March 2001 at the Incat Australia Pty shipyard in Hobart as Triumphant and delivered on 20 March to the Australian company White Rabbit, for which she took service on the Melbourne - Hobart route. In September 2002, Ferry Ulsan was sold and, renamed Dolphin Ulsan, began service on the Ulsan - Kitakyushu route across the Tsushima Strait.

In January 2015, it was sold to Krilo.hr and, renamed HD PS-1, was moved to a shipyard in Rijeka, where it underwent major refitting works, which lasted approximately two years. After the refitting, in May 2017 it was renamed Krilo Eclipse and started service on the routes between Split, Bol, Korčula, Mljet and Dubrovnik. However, at the end of the summer season, the trimaran was sold to Golden Star Ferries, thus becoming the first trimaran to fly the Greek flag.

Following the purchase by the Greek company, the trimaran was transferred to Greece, where it underwent major renovation works in the Perama and Salamina shipyards, after which it was renamed Superspeed. In 2018 it began service on the routes between Thessaloniki, Skiathos, Skopelos and Alonnisos.

In 2019, it was transferred to the Rafina, Syros, Mykonos, Paros, Naxos, Koufonīsi and Amorgos routes. However, due to a serious engine failure in Naxos, the trimaran was laid up in Piraeus during the summer season, where it remained throughout 2019.

In 2021, it was sold to compatriot Seajets, from which it was transferred to Perama and laid up again. The following year, it was then moved to the Salamina shipyard, where, in July 2025, it was renamed Notre Dame.
