= Andros Queen =

Greek ropax ferry

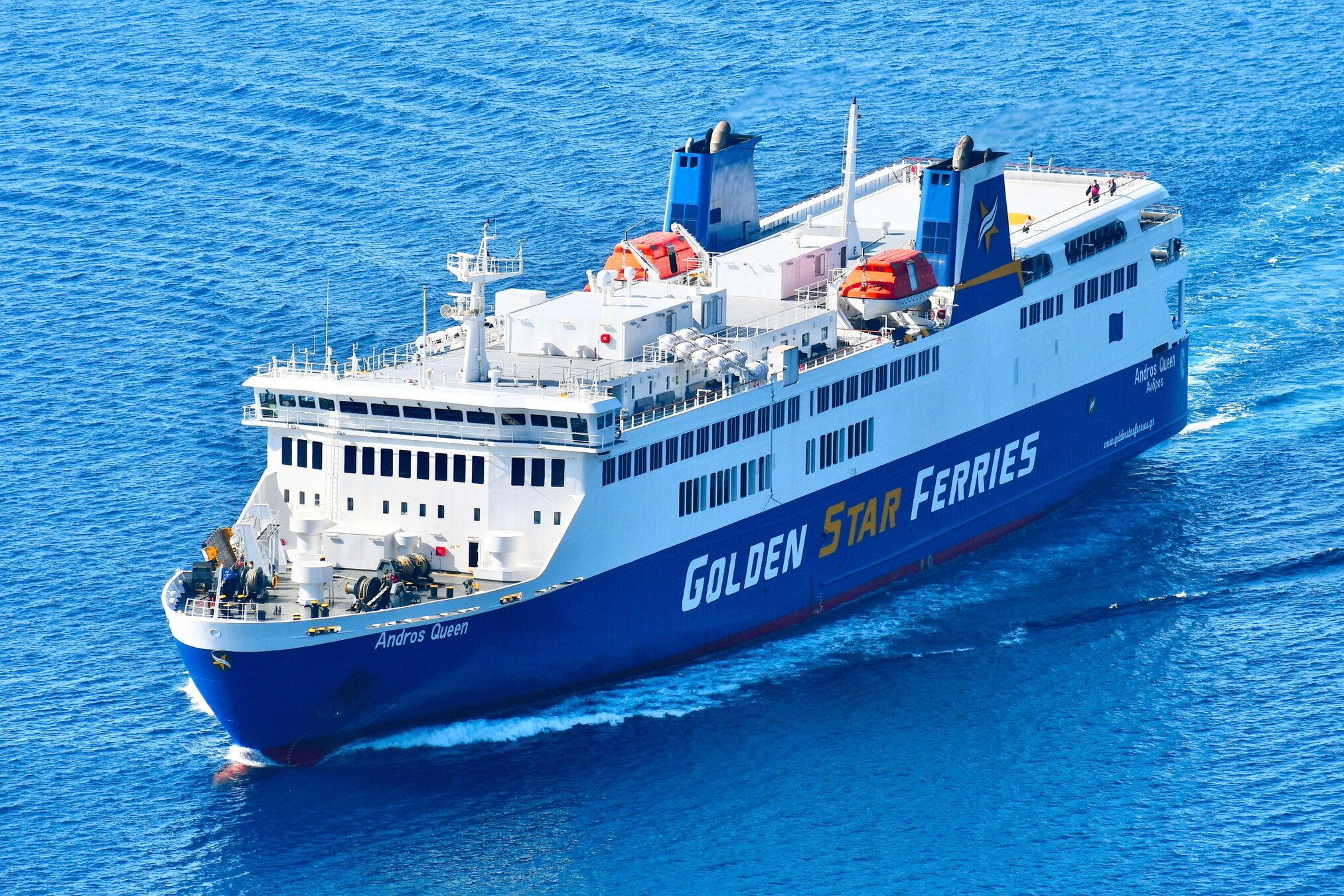
- Andros Queen in Mykonos

History
- Name: (1998–2022): Silver Queen; (2022–present): Andros Queen
- Owner: (1998–2022): Kawasaki Kinkai Kisen (Silver Ferry); (2022–present): Golden Star Ferries
- Operator: (1998–2022): Kawasaki Kinkai Kisen (Silver Ferry); (2023–present): Golden Star Ferries
- Port of registry: (1998–2022): Japan; (2023–present): Andros, Greece
- Route: Rafina – Andros – Tinos – Mykonos
- Builder: Mitsubishi Heavy Industries (Shimonoseki, Japan)
- Yard number: 1045
- Completed: 1998
- Acquired: February 2022
- Maiden voyage: 1998
- In service: 1998 (in Japan); 30 June 2023 (in Greece)
- Identification: IMO number: 9166223; Call sign: SVDS2; MMSI number: 241835000
- Status: In service
- Notes: Underwent a large-scale conversion in Perama from 2022 to 2023 before entering Greek coastal service.

General characteristics (as rebuilt)
- Tonnage: 13,886 GT; 3,455 DWT
- Length: 134.0 m (439 ft 8 in)
- Beam: 21.05 m (69 ft 1 in)
- Draft: 5.0 m (16 ft 5 in)
- Installed power: 2 × Pielstick 12PC2-6V diesel engines (13,239 kW / 18,000 BHP)
- Propulsion: Twin screw
- Speed: 20.5 knots (service); 22.0 knots (max)
- Capacity: 1,250 passengers; 360 cars

Andros Queen is a ferry operated by the Greek shipping company Golden Star Ferries, originally launched in 1998 as the Silver Queen, and has been operating on the route from Rafina to Andros, Tinos and Mykonos since 2023.

== Service ==
The ferry, launched on 29 January 1998 at the Mitsubishi Heavy Industries shipyard in Shimonoseki as Silver Queen (シルバークイーン), was delivered on 24 March to Kawasaki Kinkai Kisen, for which she took service on the Tomakomai - Hachinohe routes as a replacement for Silver Queen II.

On 24 April 2018, in preparation for the commissioning of the new Silver Tiara the following day, she was laid up pending deployment. On 22 May, after about a month of layup, she returned to service on the Muroran - Miyako routes . On 1 April 2020, due to the vessel's insufficient transport capacity, the Miyako port was moved to Hachinohe.

On 1 February 2022, she was laid up in Hachinohe and, on 9 February, the Japanese company announced the sale for a sum close to 850 million yen to the Greek Golden Star Ferries, to which she was delivered on 8 March. Following this, on the same day the ferry was renamed Andros Queen and on 29 March she sailed from Busan to the Perama shipyards, where she arrived on 12 April to undergo major renovation works. The works, which lasted almost a year, mainly concerned the complete reconstruction of the stern area, with the addition of new external sun decks. Once the works were completed, in June 2023 she began service on the connections between Rafina,Andros, Tinos and Mykonos. In the 2024 summer season she also operated on the connections to Paros.
