= MS Superferry =

Greek ropax ferry

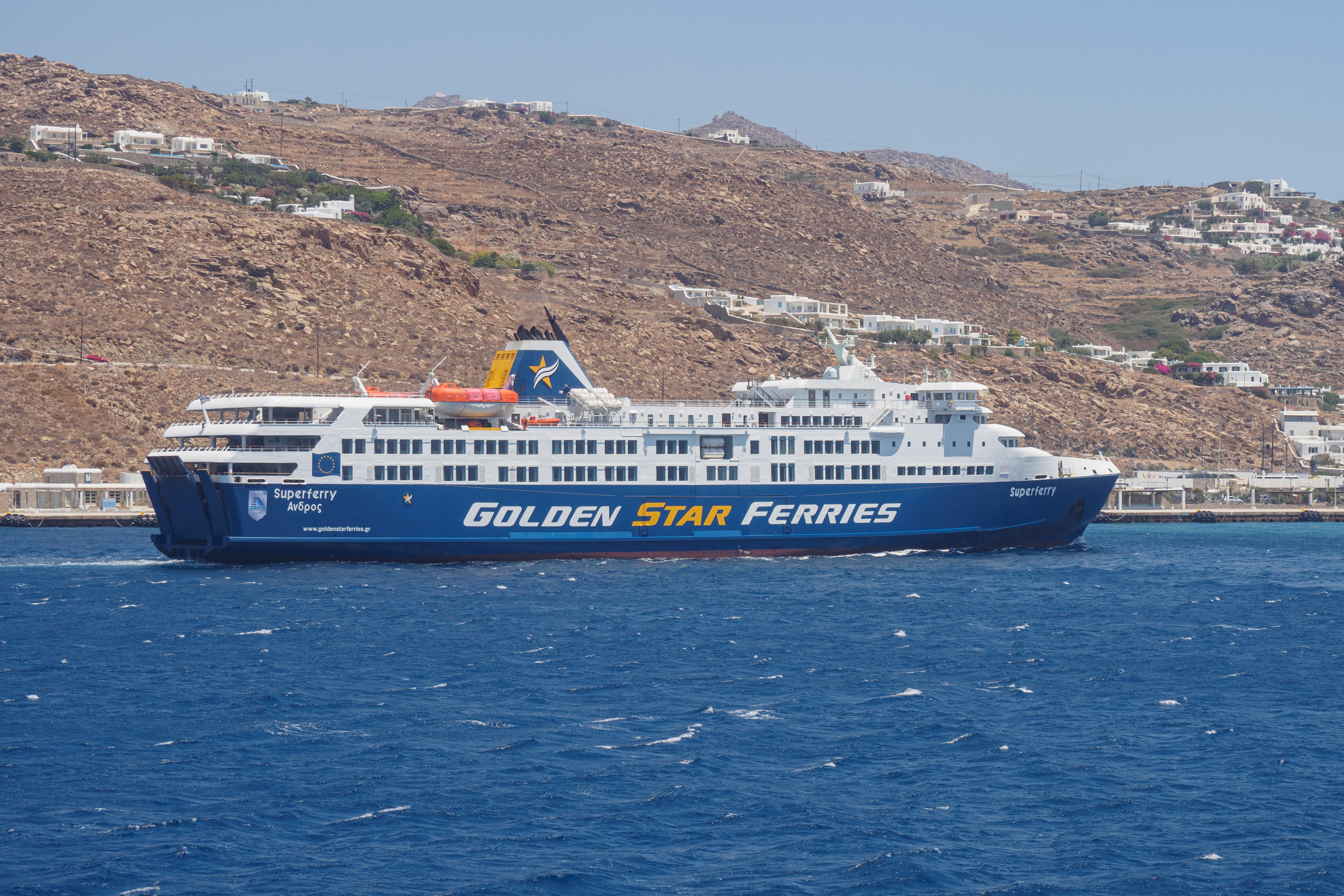
- Superferry in Mykonos

History
- Name: (1995–2015): Kogane Maru; (2015–2016): Golden Ferry; (2016–present): Superferry
- Owner: (1995–2015): Sado Steam Ship Co.; (2015–present): Golden Star Ferries
- Operator: (1995–2015): Sado Steam Ship Co.; (2015–present): Golden Star Ferries
- Port of registry: (1995–2015): Japan; (2015–present): Piraeus, Greece
- Route: Rafina – Andros – Tinos – Mykonos
- Builder: Kanda Shipbuilding (Kawajiri yard, Japan)
- Yard number: 360
- Launched: 6 December 1994
- Completed: March 1995
- Acquired: 2015 (by Golden Star Ferries)
- Maiden voyage: 1995
- In service: 1995
- Identification: IMO number: 9110016; Call sign: SVCJ9; MMSI number: 241435000
- Status: In service
- Notes: Underwent an extensive multi-million euro interior modification and luxury refit at Perama after arriving in Greece.

General characteristics (following 2015/16 Perama rebuild)
- Tonnage: 9,431 GT; 1,220 DWT
- Length: 121.72 m (399 ft 4 in)
- Beam: 21.00 m (68 ft 11 in)
- Draft: 5.2 m (17 ft 1 in)
- Installed power: 2 × NKK-Pielstick 12PC2-6V diesel engines (13,240 kW / 18,000 BHP)
- Propulsion: Twin screw
- Speed: 21.0 knots (service); 23.5 knots (max)
- Capacity: 1,400 passengers; 280 cars

Superferry is a conventional ferry owned by the Greek shipping company Golden Star Ferries. The vessel was launched on 6 December 1994 at the Kanda Zosensho KK shipyard in Kawajiri, Japan, and originally carried the name Kogane Maru. It was bought by Golden Star Ferries in 2015.

== Service ==
The ferry, launched on 6 December 1994 at the Kanda Zosensho KK shipyard in Kawajiri with the name Kogane Maru (こがね丸), was delivered on 22 March 1995 to Sado Kisen, and entered service on 14 April 1995 on the Naoetsu - Ogi route as a replacement for the 'Maru.

On 20 April 2015, in view of the entry into service of 'it was decommissioned and put up for sale. In the same month it was sold to Golden Star Ferries, to whom it was delivered in May. Renamed Golden Ferry, the new acquisition of the Greek company then set sail from Japan for the Perama shipyards, where it arrived on 12 June to undergo major renovation works in preparation for its new employment in the Aegean. The cycle of works, which lasted almost a year, mainly concerned the passenger area of the ferry, which was completely refurbished. Once the works were completed, on 19 January 2016 it was renamed Superferry and on 7 July it began service on the connections between Rafina, Andros, Tinos and Mykonos. In the 2017 summer season a final stopover in Naxos was also added.

In 2018, together with its fleet mate Superferry II, it inaugurated the first maritime connection between Rafina and Crete, operating the connections between Rafina, Andros, Tinos, Mykonos, Paros, Ios, Santorini and Heraklion. However, in 2019 the stopover at Ios was abolished .

In 2020 it was transferred back to its original Greek route, between Rafina, Andros, Tinos and Mykonos, where it still operates today.

== Accidents and Incidents ==
On 9 September 2023, while anchored at the port of Rafina during severe weather conditions with north-north-easterly winds of 7–8 Beaufort, the Superferry became involved in a major multi-vessel anchor fouling incident. The situation began when the departing ferry Fast Ferries Andros dragged the anchor chain of the nearby moored Ekaterini P, causing the latter to drift toward the Superferry.

To avoid a collision, the captain of the Superferry performed an emergency departure. In order to clear the harbor safely with 481 passengers, 55 crew members, and 79 vehicles on board, the vessel was forced to slip and abandon its port anchor and chain.

The Superferry successfully executed the emergency maneuver without injury or damage and proceeded on its scheduled itinerary. Upon arriving at its next destination, the Master of the vessel officially notified the Tinos Port Authority regarding the loss of the port anchor. The local port management initially issued a temporary detention order; however, after the vessel's classification society inspected the ship and provided a certificate of seaworthiness, the restriction was lifted, allowing the Superferry to resume its commercial operations.
