= Pikermi =

Pikermi Πικέρμι
- Municipal unit
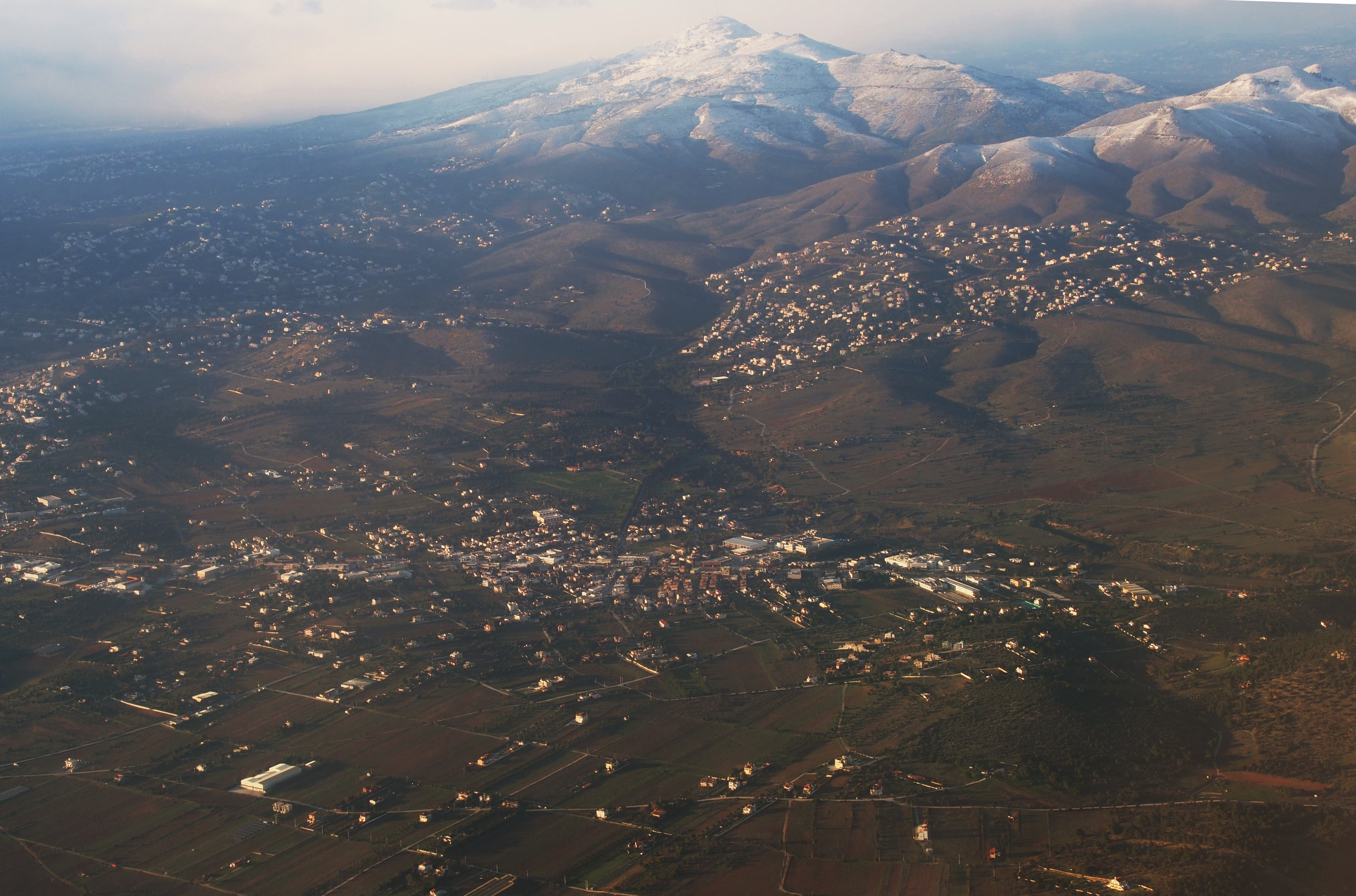
- Center of Pikermi

- Location within the regional unit

- Location within Greece
- Coordinates: 38°0′N 23°56′E
- Country: Greece
- Administrative region: Attica
- Regional unit: East Attica
- Municipality: Rafina-Pikermi

Area
  - Municipal unit: 21.522 km^{2} (8.310 sq mi)
- Elevation: 140 m (460 ft)

Population (2021)
  - Municipal unit: 7,707
  - Municipal unit density: 358.1/km^{2} (927.5/sq mi)
- Time zone: UTC+2 (EET)
  - Summer (DST): UTC+3 (EEST)
- Postal code: 190 09
- Area code: 210
- Vehicle registration: Z
- Website: www.koinotita-pikermiou.gr

Pikermi (Greek: Πικέρμι) is a suburb of Athens and a former community of East Attica regional unit, Greece. Since the 2011 local government reform it is part of the municipality Rafina-Pikermi, of which it is a municipal unit. The municipal unit has an area of 21.522 km^{2}.

== Geography ==
Pikermi is situated at the northern edge of the Mesogaia plain, south of the Penteliko Mountain. It is 5 km east of Pallini, 6 km west of Rafina and 19 km east of Athens city centre. Greek National Road 54 (Athens - Rafina) passes through Pikermi. The municipal unit Pikermi consists of the settlements Pikermi, Drafi and Dioni.

== Paleontology ==
Pikermi features a paleontological site which has more than forty mammal species from the late Miocene (8 million years ago). What is special about Pikermi is that it is one of the first Miocene fossil localities to be discovered. It was discovered in 1839 by Bavarian soldiers of king Otto. Since it was one of the first localities, many of the species named there are type species. The locality itself is used as the archetypal example of a 'Pikermian' chronofauna that existed from Afghanistan to the Balkans during the Late Miocene. Similar fossils are found on Samos Island in Greece and Shanxi China.

== Historical population ==
Year	Village population	Community population
1981	509	-
1991	650	1,293
2001	1,168	2,931
2011	2,009	7,175
2021	2,082	7,707
