= Theologos P =

Japanese built ferry

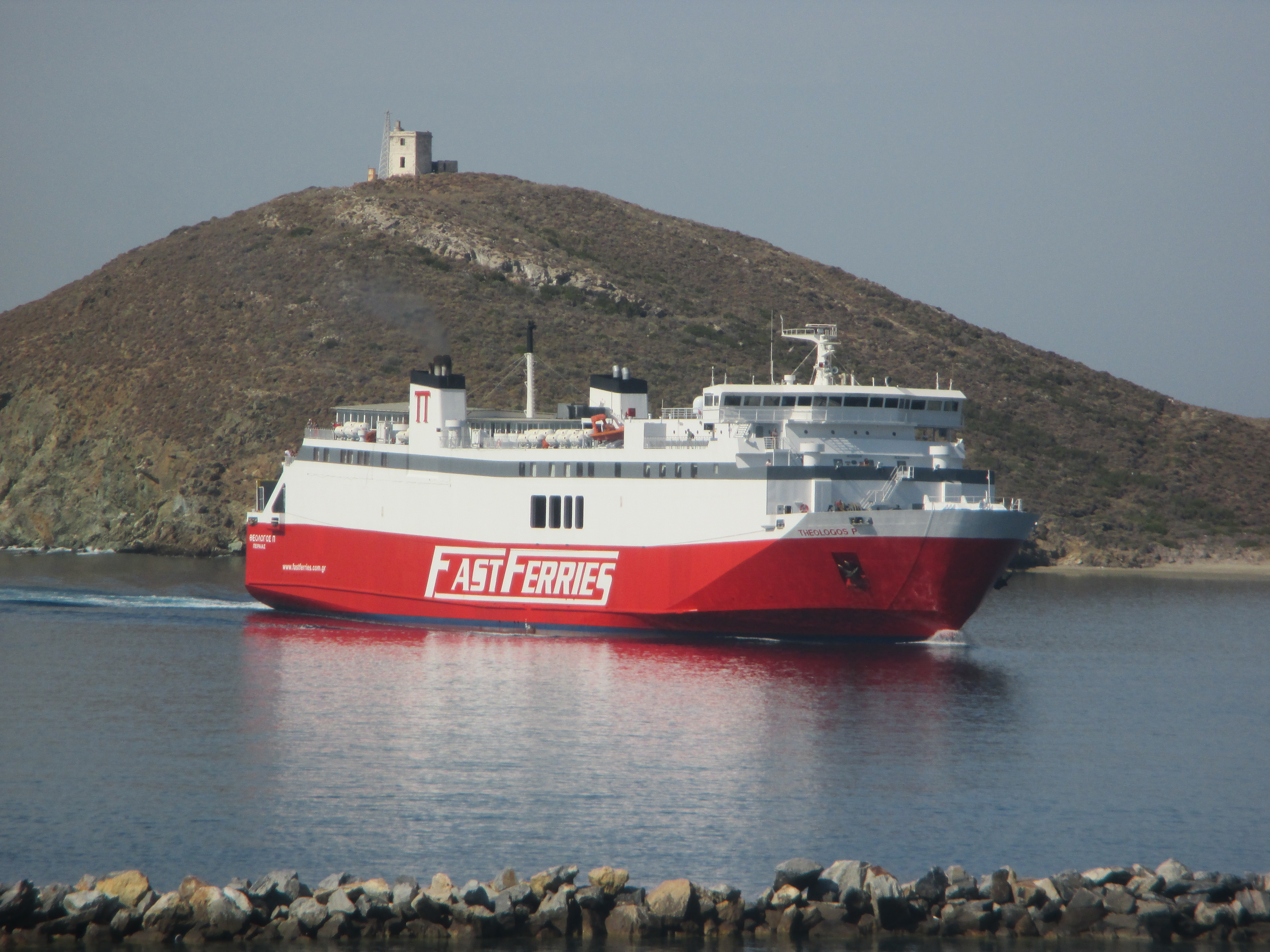
- Theologos P in Andros

History
- Name: (2000–2006): Ferry Kōchi; (2006–present): Theologos P.
- Owner: (2000–2006): Osaka Kōchi Express Ferry; (2006–present): Fast Ferries
- Operator: (2000–2005): Osaka Kōchi Express Ferry; (2007–present): Fast Ferries
- Port of registry: (2000–2006): Osaka, Japan; (2006–present): Piraeus, Greece
- Route: Rafina – Andros – Tinos – Mykonos
- Builder: Yamanishi Corporation; Ishinomaki, Japan
- Yard number: 1018
- Laid down: 7 October 1999
- Launched: 13 April 2000
- Completed: 31 July 2000
- Acquired: April 2006 (by Fast Ferries)
- Maiden voyage: 19 August 2000
- In service: 19 August 2000 (Japan)
- Identification: IMO number: 9223150; Call sign: SZNB; MMSI number: 240521000
- Status: In service
- Notes: Underwent a significant rebuild at Perama from May 2006 to early 2007 to modify the garage and optimize layout for Cyclades service.

General characteristics (following 2006/07 Perama rebuild)
- Tonnage: 4,942 GT; 1,481 DWT
- Length: 117.20 m (384 ft 6 in)
- Beam: 21.00 m (68 ft 11 in)
- Draft: 5.2 m (17 ft 1 in)
- Installed power: 2 * Niigata 9PC2-6L
- Propulsion: Twin screw
- Speed: 20.0 knots (service); 22.0 knots (max)
- Capacity: 1,154 passengers; 300 cars or 70 trucks

Theologos P. is a conventional ferry belonging to the Greek shipping company Fast Ferries. Launched on 13 April 2000 at the Yamanishi Corporation shipyard in Ishinomaki, Japan, the vessel was originally named Ferry Kōchi and was delivered to the Osaka Kōchi Express Ferry company on 31 July 2000. In April 2006, she was purchased by Fast Ferries, brought to Greece, and renamed Theologos P.

== Service ==
The ferry, launched on 13 April 2000 at the Yamanishi Corporation shipyard in Ishinomaki with the name Ferry Kōchi (フェリーこうち), was delivered on 31 July to the Japanese Osaka Kōchi Express Ferry. On 19 August it then entered service on the routes between Osaka and Kōchi replacing the old New Tosa, which was simultaneously sold to Dodekanissos NE, and joining the New Katsura.

On 10 December 2001, following the suspension of the Ashizuri route by Kōchi Sea Line, it also began calling at Ashizuri, where it operated until 10 April 2004. In August the call was transferred to Kaoura. On 30 June 2005, with the bankruptcy of the shipping company, the ferry was decommissioned and put up for sale.

In April 2006, it was purchased by the Greek Fast Ferries and, renamed Theologos P., was transferred to the Perama shipyards, where it arrived on 25 May. After undergoing renovations and adaptation to the new service, in January 2007 it inaugurated the new connections between Rafina, Gavrio, Tinos and Mykonos, thus marking the debut of the company in the Cyclades. However, the new ferry was a huge success, so much so that, shortly afterwards, Fast Ferries decided to transfer the other units of the fleet to the Aegean as well.

In 2017 it operated on the routes between Rafina, Andros, Tinos, Mykonos and Naxos. After the season, it was transferred back to its own route. In the 2024 summer season it operated on the connections between Rafina, Andros, Tinos, Mykonos and Paros, in tandem with Fast Ferries Andros. Subsequently, it returned to operate on its own route also on this occasion.

== Accidents and Incidents ==
=== 2008 collision with Superferry II ===
On 23 July 2008, shortly after 10:00 AM, the conventional ferry Superferry II was involved in a harbor collision at the port of Gavrio in Andros. While executing its docking maneuvers upon arrival from Rafina, the vessel struck the ferry Theologos P., which was anchored in the harbor and preparing to depart for Rafina.

The impact shattered several windows in the Superferry II's airplane-style seating salon, resulting in minor injuries and scratches to three passengers who received on-site medical treatment. The local municipality and port officials confirmed that structural damage to the Superferry II was minor and localized high on the upper deck structure. Both vessels were immediately issued temporary detention orders by the port authority, keeping them moored at Gavrio until formal technical safety inspections could be completed to clear them for travel.

==== 2014 allision with Superferry II ====
On 5 July 2014, during its docking maneuvers at the port of Rafina under severe weather conditions, the Theologos P. suffered a snapped port mooring line. The force of the weather caused the vessel to drift and foul its propeller in both the port and starboard anchors of the adjacent, moored ferry Superferry II.

The incident resulted in the severing of the Superferry II's port anchor, while the Theologos P. became immobilized and was forced to remain anchored roughly 70 meters off the pier, unable to berth safely. The tugboat Panormitis was dispatched from Piraeus to assist in clearing the tangled starboard anchor and towing Theologos P. to safety. Both vessels were carrying a combined total of over 2,000 passengers bound for the Cyclades, who had to be rerouted via alternative ships. The Central Port Authority of Rafina subsequently detained both the Theologos P. and Superferry II pending full technical inspections and re-certification by their respective classification societies.
