= Drafi =

Settlement in Attica, Greece

Coordinates: 38°2′N 23°54′E

Drafi (Greek: Ντράφι) is a residential settlement located in a semi-mountainous slopped region in the municipal unit of Pikermi, in the municipality Rafina–Pikermi, East Attica, Greece. Its population is 2,976 (2021). It is situated east of Athens city center, on the slopes of the Penteliko Mountain. It is bordering Pikermi, Dioni, Penteli, Anthousa and Pallini.

Drafi is considered a middle-scale residential area, with many detached houses and luxury mansions. Its developmental stage peaked during 2000-2004, when large scale infrastructure works in East Attica, such as the new international airport in Spata, increased interest for new residences in the wider area. The road network is highly slopped and not fully developed, although Drafi offers a few wider roads than its neighbouring Dioni, such as Achaion St, connecting Drafi with Penteli and Anthousa. Drafi is also well connected towards the center of Pikermi, through Elaionon St.

Drafi has faced wildfires multiple times in the past (considerable damages in 1995, 1998, 2009 and 2022).
