= Panagia Pantobasilissa Church, Tirilye =

Church in Tirilye, Turkey

Panagia Pantobasilissa
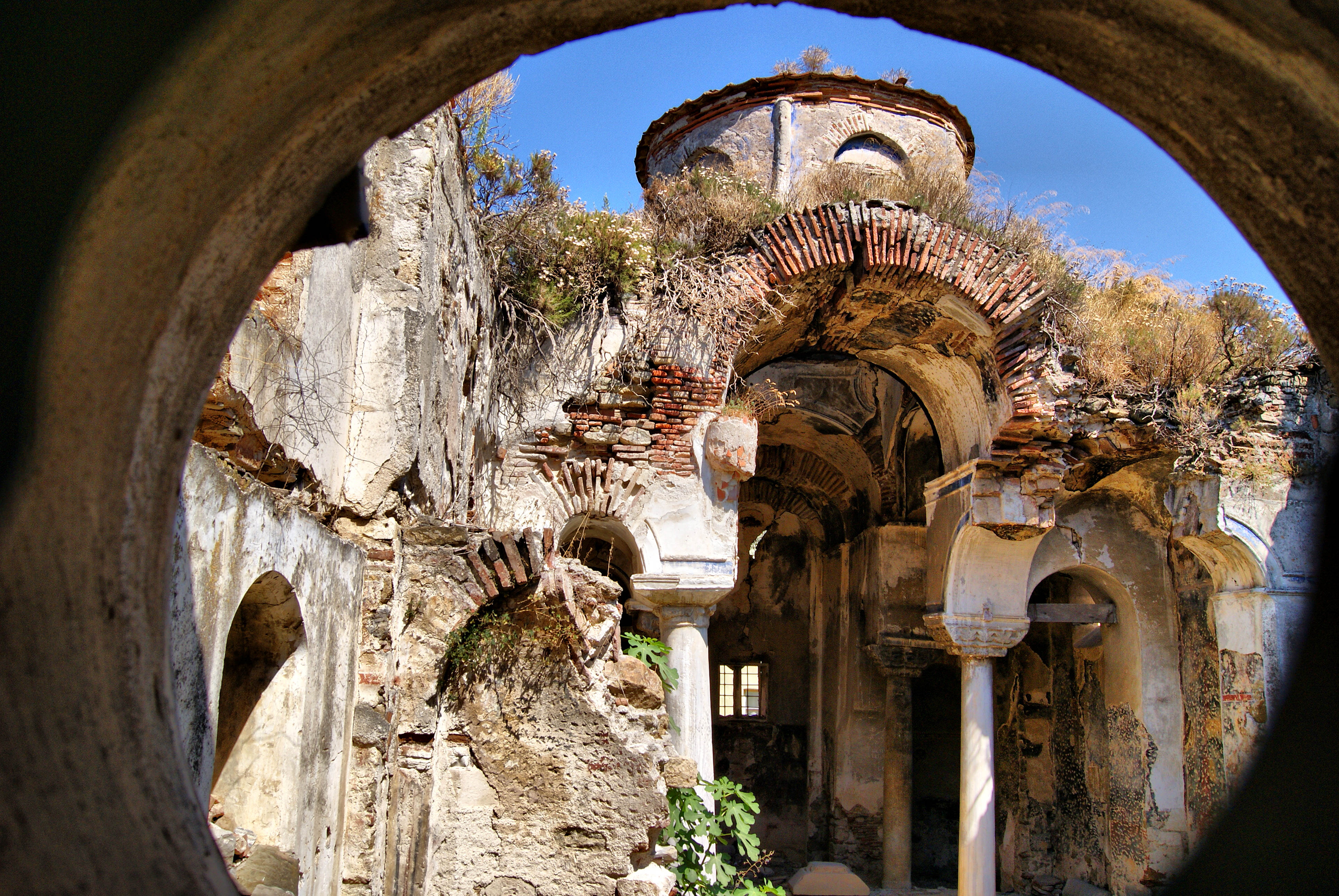

Religion
- Affiliation: Christianity

Location
- Location: Tirilye, Bursa Province, Turkey
- Interactive map of Panagia Pantobasilissa
- Coordinates: 40.393311°N 28.795051°E

Architecture
- Type: Church
- Style: Byzantine architecture

Panagia Pantobasilissa (Greek: Παναγία Παντοβασίλισσα, "Panagia the Queen of All") or Arched Church (Turkish: Kemerli kilise) as it is called in the region is known to be the first church whose walls were decorated with frescoes. Dating back to the middle ages, it was used as a church until the Greco-Turkish population exchange in 1922. Plans for a restoration in 2014 haven't been approved by the Turkish government.

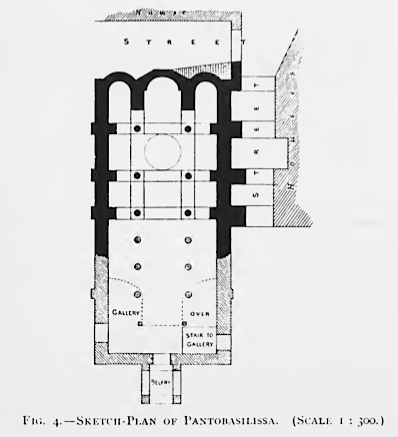
Sketch of the medieval church by FW Hasluck

It is indicated in some handwritten scripts that the church was dedicated to Panagia Pantobasillissa. The church is based on a Greek cross plan to in the east and west directions. Although the building is not used currently, it has still survived. According to the construction style of its walls, it is believed that the building was constructed at the end of the 13th century. The church has pictures on its walls at different layers and is considered to be very important for Christians. The first layer of frescos were made at the start of the 14th century, the second layer of frescos were made in 1723. It is believed that the columns were brought from Alexandria. There are support pillars at the façades and the public calls the building as the Arched Church. The walls and the dome of the church are in good condition.

== See also ==
- Panagia Pantobasilissa church, Rafina
