= Linda Line =

Company based in Estonia

- Industry: passenger transportation
- Founded: 1997
- Defunct: November 2017
- Area served: Tallinn, Estonia and Helsinki, Finland

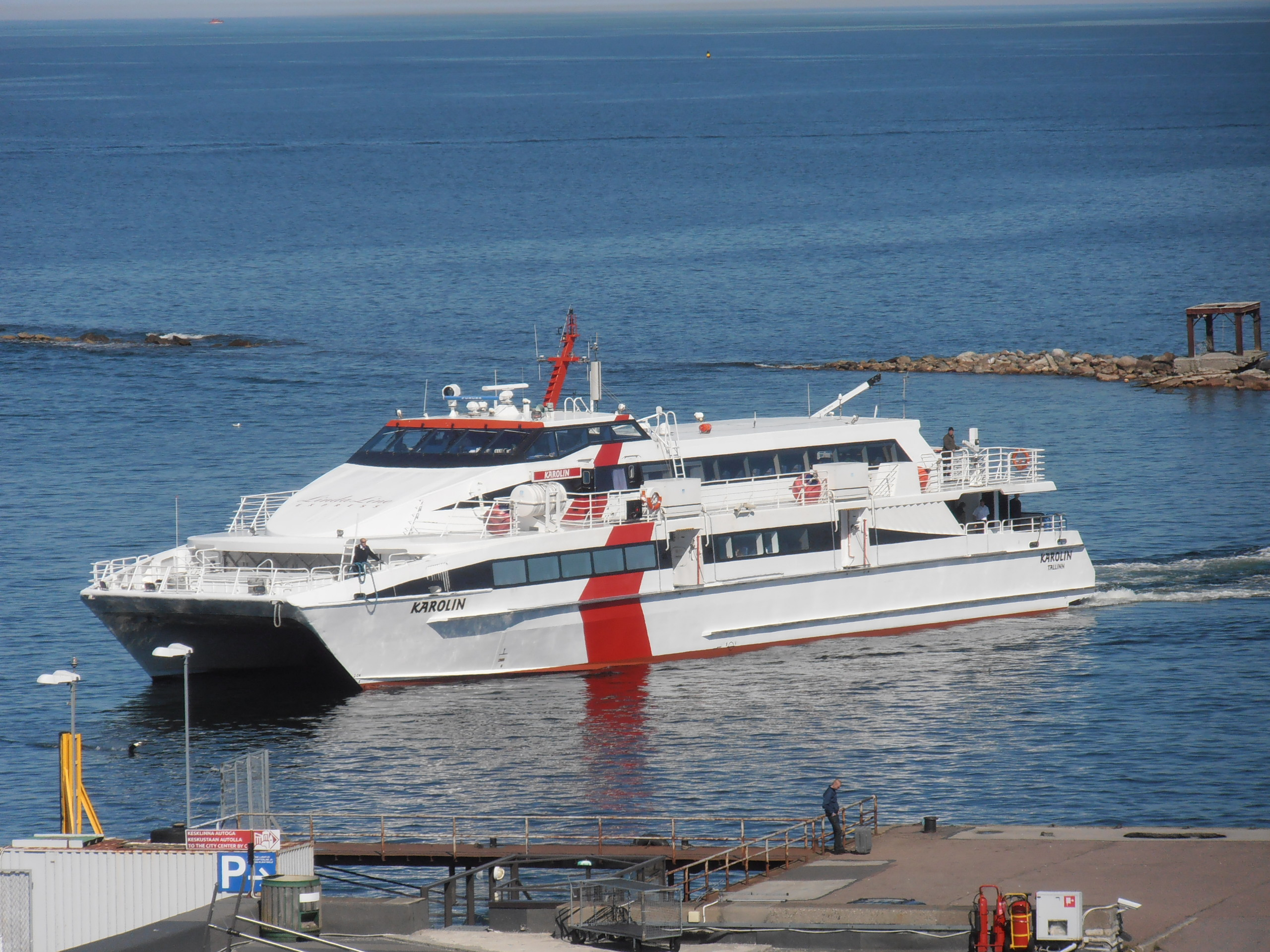
Karolin arriving at Tallinn's Linnahall terminal in 2013.

Linda Line was the brand name of Lindaliini AS, an Estonian ferry company operating between Tallinn, Estonia and Helsinki, Finland. Its high-speed passenger ferry Karolin was the fastest vessel sailing between the two cities, linking Tallinn's Linnahall terminal and Helsinki's Makasiini terminal in 100 minutes. The company was founded in 1997. It ceased operations in November 2017 and filed for bankruptcy in May 2018.

== History ==
Lindaliini AS was founded in 1997 as the successor of shipping company Inreko Laeva AS. It started operations with a fleet of three hydrofoils, which were able to make the journey between Tallinn and Helsinki in an hour and a half, much faster than the conventional ferries serving the same route.

Starting in 2007, the hydrofoils were replaced with catamarans, which were less expensive to maintain and had better seaworthiness. Still catamarans are more dependent on the weather than traditional vessels, and Linda Line had a policy of cancelling departures when wind speeds exceeded 15 metres per second and/or wave heights were over 3 metres.

In 2017, Linda Lines announced the delivery of a new vessel for 2018. Operations ended in November 2017, and Merilin and Karolin were sold off. The announced delivery of the new vessel was initially announced to be delayed. The company eventually filed for bankruptcy in May 2018.

== Fleet ==
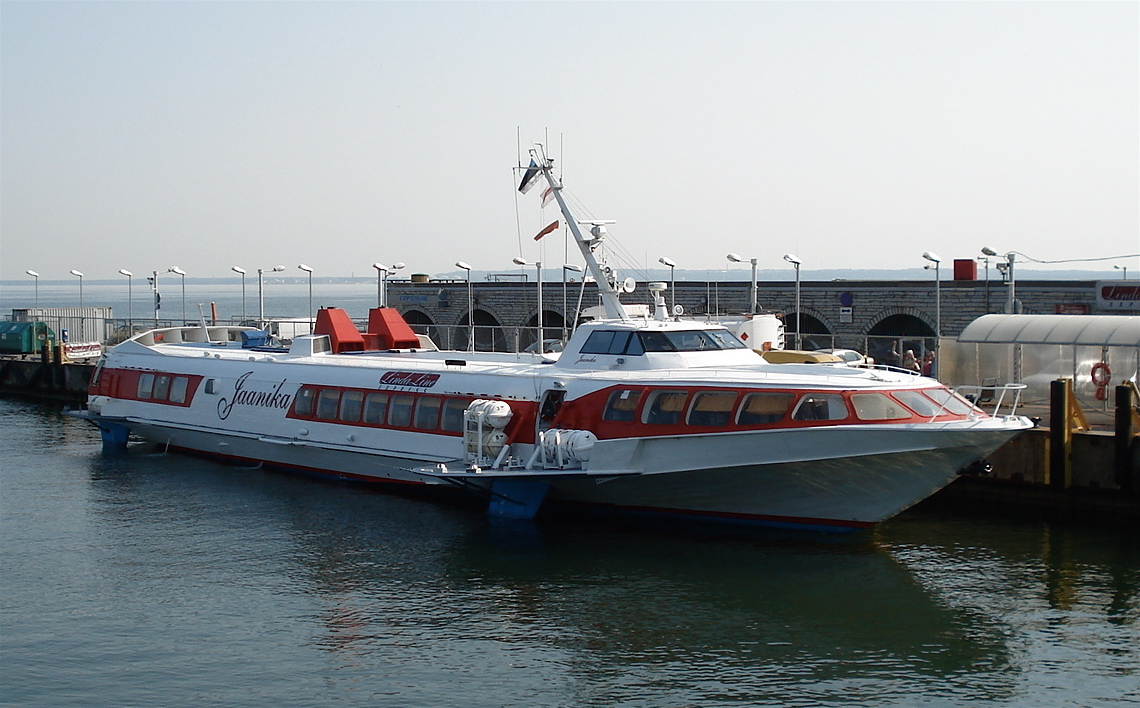
Jaanika at Tallinn in 2006

Ship	Line	Type	Purchased/Delivered	In service	Sold	Current name	Notes
Karolin	Tallinn–Helsinki	Catamaran	2008	2009–2017	2017		Built in Australia in 2000, damaged in a storm in summer 2008. She had a capacity of 353 passengers and a maximum speed of 37 knots.
Merilin	Tallinn–Helsinki	Catamaran	2007	2007–2017	2017	Eldorado	Linda Line’s largest high-speed vessel
Juku	Tallinn–Aegna	Passenger ship	2008	2008–2009			Acquired by AS Kihnu Veeteed.
Jaanika	Tallinn–Helsinki	Hydrofoil	1997	1997–2007	2008	Hermes	Now serving the Sochi–Trabzon line in Russia.
Laura	Tallinn–Helsinki	Hydrofoil	1997	1997–2006	2007	Marine Princess	Later served the Nessebar–Istanbul line, now decommissioned.
Liisa	Tallinn–Helsinki	Double decker hydrofoil	1997	1997–1998	1998	Delfini XXX	Now operating in Greece under the ownership of Thirian Coastlines Shipping Co.
Linda Express	Tallinn–Helsinki	Foiling catamaran	2002	2002–2004	2004	Shi Ji Kuai Hang	Constantly experiencing problems, it was the world’s fastest passenger ship at the time.
Sea Flower	Tallinn–Helsinki	Trimaran	–	–	–	Sea Flower	Purchase planned for 2008/9 but not completed.

In 2008, Linda Line planned to purchase a trimaran-type vessel for the Tallinn–Helsinki route, intended to replace hydrofoil Jaanika. The trimaran would have been safer and slightly larger than Merilin. The launch was initially planned for April 2009, but this was soon postponed to June 26, and the purchase was ultimately not completed for unknown reasons. Linda Line started the 2009 season with two catamarans, Merilin and the newly acquired Karolin.

== Tallinn–Helsinki route ==
In Tallinn, the Linda Line high-speed ferries departed from Linnahall terminal and in Helsinki from Makasiini terminal. Both ships had a Linda class and a VIP class separated from the rest of the cabin, and the company offered a variety of hotel and leisure packages in Helsinki.

== Tallinn–Aegna route ==
On April 16, 2008, the Tallinn City Government decided to award the contract for the Tallinn-Aegna shipping line to Linda Line. The decision was also helped by a decision made at the end of March to have the route depart from Linnahall terminal instead of Pirita. The line was operated by the small passenger ship Juku. At the beginning of 2010, the right to operate the route with Juku was granted to AS Kihnu Veeteed.

== Fleet by year ==
Years	Ships
1997	Jaanika, Laura, Liisa
1998–2001	Jaanika, Laura
2002–2004	Jaanika, Laura, Linda Express
2005–2006	Jaanika, Laura
2007	Jaanika, Merilin
2008	Merilin
2009	Merilin, Karolin
2010–	Merilin, Karolin
2017	Karolin
2018	–
