= Supercat Jet =

HSC catamaran

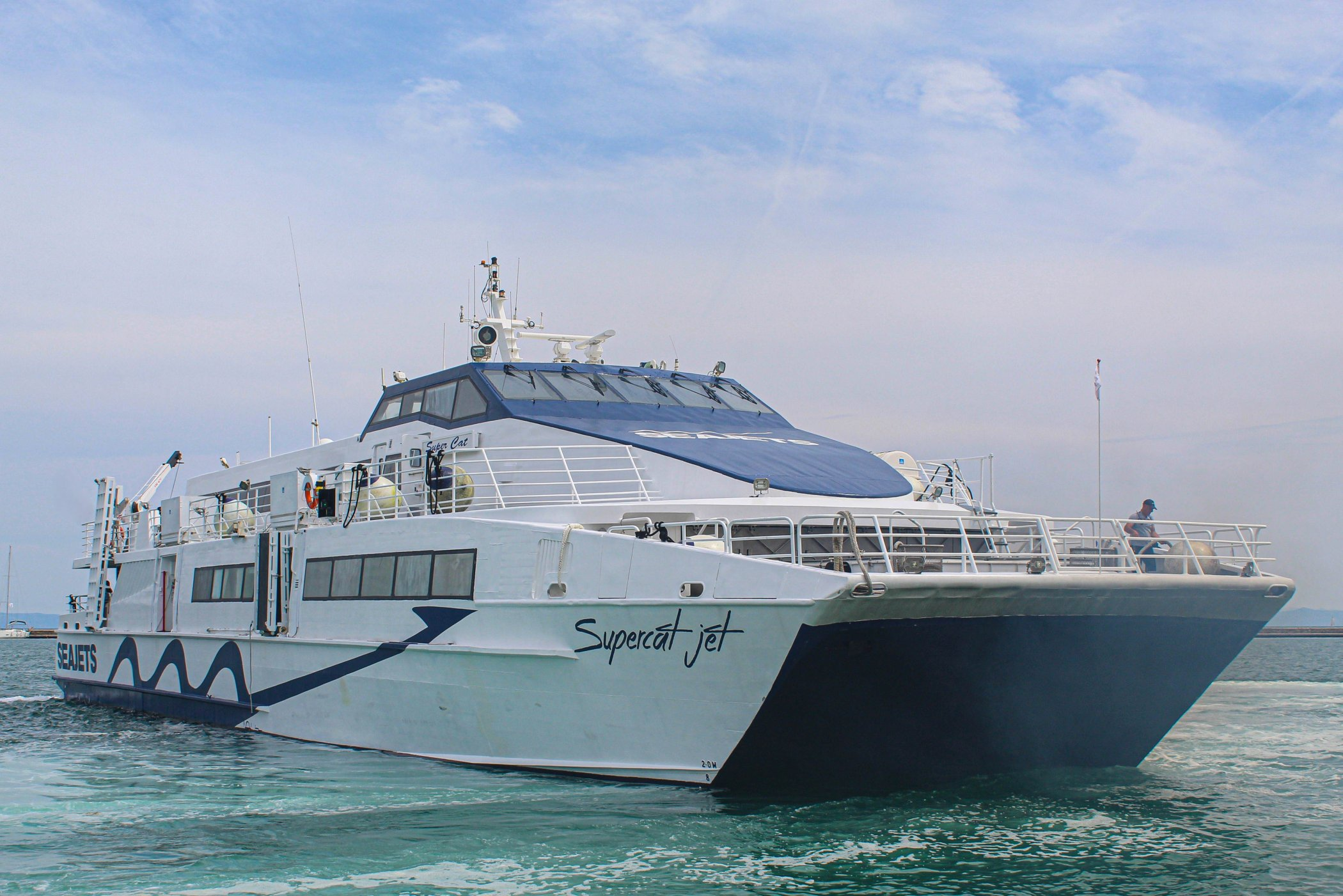
- Supercat Jet in Volos

History
- Name: (1995–2000): Caribbean Jet (intended); (2000–2008): Polarstern; (2008–2018): Karolin; (2018–2021): Supercat; (2021–present): Supercat Jet
- Owner: (2000–2008): AG Ems; (2008–2018): Lindaliini AS (Linda Line); (2018–2021): Golden Star Ferries; (2021–present): Seajets
- Operator: (2001–2008): AG Ems; (2009–2017): Lindaliini AS; (2018–2021): Golden Star Ferries; (2021–present): Seajets
- Port of registry: (2001–2008): Borkum, Germany; (2008–2018): Tallinn, Estonia; (2018–present): Piraeus, Greece
- Builder: Oceanfast / International Shipyards Pty. Ltd.; Henderson, Western Australia
- Yard number: 16
- Launched: 1 November 1995
- Christened: 27 April 2001
- Completed: 20 October 2000
- Maiden voyage: 2001
- In service: 28 April 2001
- Identification: IMO number: 9124433; Call sign: SVA7887; MMSI number: 240064800
- Status: in service

General characteristics
- Type: HSC Passenger Catamaran
- Tonnage: 636 GT
- Length: 45.00 m (147 ft 8 in)
- Beam: 12.32 m (40 ft 5 in)
- Draft: 2.06 m (6 ft 9 in)
- Propulsion: 4 × MTU 16V396TE diesel engines (7,840 kW total); Waterjets
- Speed: 35 knots (service); 40 knots (max)
- Capacity: 300 passengers

Supercat Jet is a catamaran belonging to the Greek shipping company Seajets. The catamaran, commissioned by OceanFast Ferries from the specialist shipyard Austal in Fremantle, Australia, was launched on 1 November 1995 with the name Caribe Jet.

== Service ==
Originally commissioned by OceanFast Ferries from the specialist shipyard Austal in Fremantle, Australia, was launched on 1 November 1995 with the name Caribe Jet and, due to the bankruptcy of the company that ordered it, remained incomplete in the Perth shipyard, where it remained until 20 October 2000, when it was purchased from the German company AG Ems for 4 million US dollars, by which it was renamed Polarstern on 6 November of the same year, being returned to the builders to be adapted for the new service in Germany.

On 11 March 2001, four months after its purchase, the catamaran was delivered to its owner, who loaded it onto a market and transferred it to Papenburg, where on 27 April it was christened by godmother Brigitte Seiters, and the following day it was put into service between that port,Ditzum, Emden, Eemshaven, Borkum and, occasionally, Helgoland. In the following years, the catamaran continued to serve the route regularly, until 5 August 2008, when, during the navigation between Helgoland and Borkum, it was hit by bad weather, causing the bow windows to break, resulting in twenty-three injuries among the passengers.This marked the end of her German career, which officially ended in September, when she was purchased by Estonian Linda Lines, who renamed her Karolin on 5 November, and introduced her in April 2009 on the Tallinn - Helsinki routes, where she operated alongside Merilin.

In September 2017, after approximately eight years of service on the routes between the two shores of the Gulf of Finland, the catamaran was sold to the Greek Golden Star Ferries, from which it was embarked on 10 January 2018 on board the merchant vessel Eemslift Hendrica and transferred on 23 January to Lavrio, where it was disembarked, being subsequently refurbished in the shipyards of Ampelakia and Perama, where in June it was renamed Supercat, then entering service in the summer of 2019 on the routes between Piraeus, Milos, Folegandros, Santorini, Ios, Naxos and Mykonos.On 11 August 2021, at the end of its second season in Greece, the catamaran was purchased by fellow Greek company Seajets, from which it was renamed Supercat Jet and reintroduced in the Cyclades, on the connections between Santorini, Naxos, Paros, Mykonos, Tinos and Ios, in 2022, with the last stopover suppressed the following year and the penultimate one in 2023. In 2024 the stopover of Ios was finally re-added, to the detriment of those of Paros and Tinos in 2025. In 2026 the service was instead limited to Paros, Ios and Santorini.
