= MS SuperStar =

Belgian built Ferry

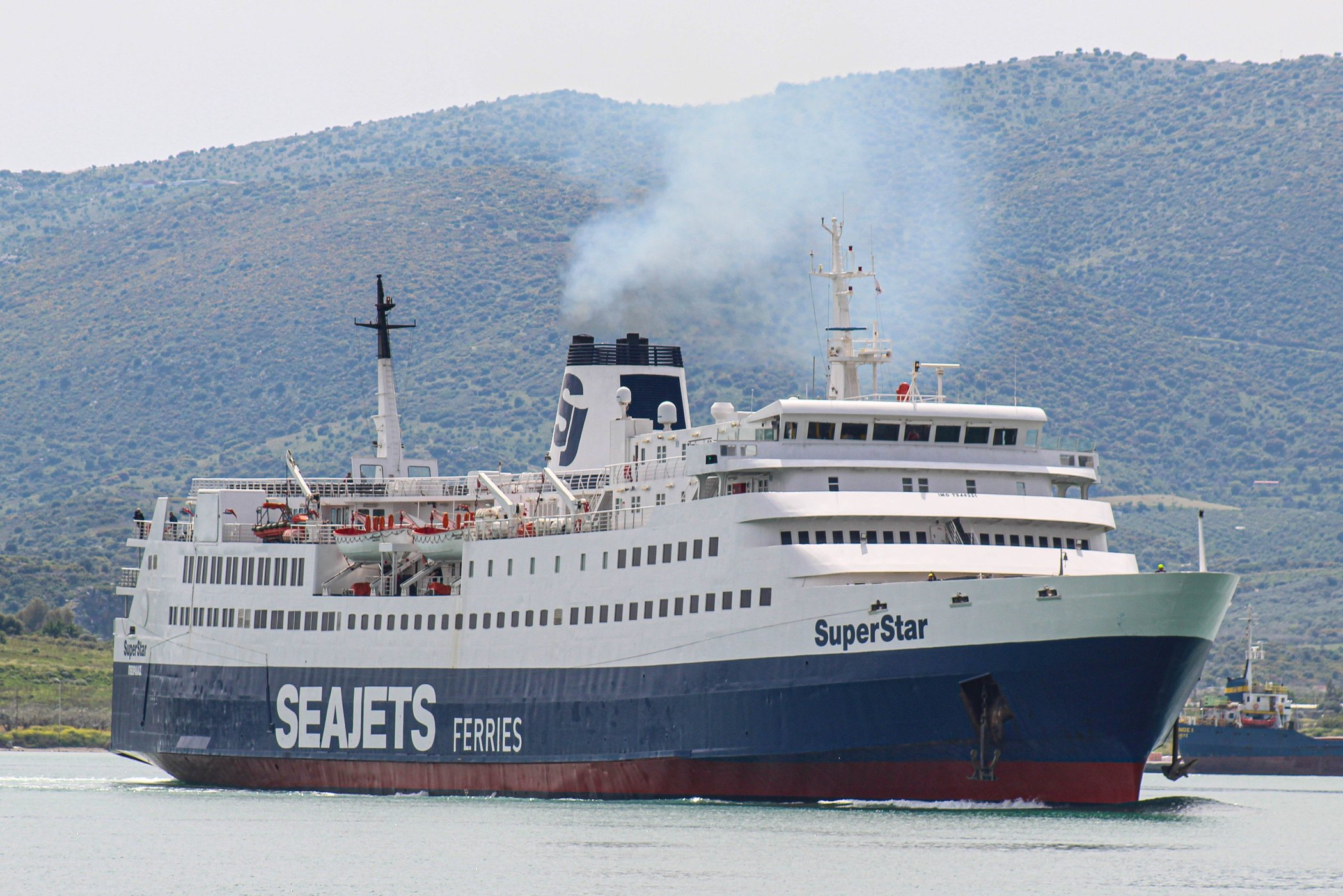
- SuperStar in Volos

History
- Name: (1974–1992): Prince Laurent; (1992–1993): Ionian Express; (1993–2021): Superferry II; (2021–present): SuperStar
- Owner: Regie voor Maritiem Transport (RMT) (1974–1992); Strintzis Lines (1992–2008); Blue Star Ferries (2008–2011); Golden Star Ferries (2011–2021); Seajets (Sgoni Shipping Ltd) (2021–present)
- Operator: Regie voor Maritiem Transport (RMT) (1974–1992); Strintzis Lines (1993–2000); Blue Star Ferries (2000–2011); Golden Star Ferries (2011–2021); Seajets (2021–present)
- Port of registry: Piraeus, Greece
- Builder: Boelwerf, Temse, Belgium
- Yard number: 1477
- Launched: 6 February 1974
- Completed: 1974
- Identification: IMO number: 7346221; MMSI: 237001000; Call sign: SWKV
- Status: In service

General characteristics
- Type: Ro-Pax Ferry
- Tonnage: 4,986 GT
- Length: 121.7 m (399 ft)
- Beam: 19.2 m (63 ft)
- Draft: 4.7 m (15 ft)
- Propulsion: 2 × Pielstick-Atlantique 18PC2V diesel engines
- Speed: 19 knots (service); 21 knots (max)
- Capacity: 1,480 passengers; 240 cars
- Notes: Sister ship to Express Limnos

Superstar is a ferry belonging to the Greek shipping company Seajets. She was previously owned by Golden Star Ferries and was named Superferry II. She was launched in 1974 as Prince Laurent.

== Service ==
The ferry, the second of a series of two sister units, was launched on 6 February 1974 at the NV Boelwerf SA shipyard in Tamise with the name of Prince Laurent and delivered on 5 July to the RMT, for which she entered service ten days later on the cross-Channel services between Ostend and Dover, joining her sister ship Prince Philippe.

On 2 February 1978 she collided with the quay in the port of Dover, suffering minor damage. Following this, once she returned to Ostend, she was transferred to the shipyard.

From 4 February to May 1990 she was chartered to Sealink Dieppe Ferries, for whom she operated the Dieppe to Newhaven route. After the charter ended, she returned to her own route, which, from 1991, she operated only in the summer period, remaining laid up for the rest of the year.

On 29 July 1992 she was sold to the Greek company Strintzis Lines and, renamed Ionian Express, was transferred from Ostend to Perama, where she underwent major refurbishment works, including the enlargement of the garage, the complete refitting of the interior spaces, the removal of most of the cabins and the remodelling of the stern and the stern, in the case of the stern with the addition of a balcony. Once the works were completed, in May 1993 she was renamed Superferry II and initially took service on the routes between Rafina, Andros, Tinos, Mykonos, Syros, Astypalea, Kalymnos, Kos, Nisyros, Tilos and Rhodes. In 1994 she then started operating only on the routes between Rafina, Andros, Tinos, Mykonos and Syros.

In 2000, with the acquisition of Strintzis Lines by Attica Group, it was transferred to the newly formed Blue Star Ferries, continuing to operate on the same route under the banner of the Blue Ferries division. It also operated occasionally during the winter period on the connections between Piraeus Syros, Tinos and Mykonos, replacing the other units of the fleet.

On 25 September 2010 she collided with the quay at Tinos, causing a nine-metre gash in her side below the waterline, which resulted in the flooding of some watertight compartments and the engine room. This ended her service for the Greek company, which decided to put the vessel up for sale. A few months later, in February 2011, she was purchased by the newly formed Golden Star Ferries, which subjected the ferry to a series of renovations, during which a bulbous bow was added. In March she returned to service on the routes between Rafina, Andros, Tinos, Mykonos and Naxos. In 2013 she then returned to operate on the routes between Rafina, Andros, Tinos, Mykonos and Syros.

In 2016, with the entry into service of the new Superferry, it was temporarily transferred to the connections between Rafina, Andros, Tinos, Mykonos, Ios, Naxos and Paros. In 2017, after another round of renovation works in Perama, it returned to service on the connections between Rafina, Andros, Tinos, Mykonos and Syros.

In 2018, it was transferred together with Superferry to the new connections between Rafina, Andros, Tinos, Mykonos, Paros, Ios, Santorini and Heraklion, thus marking the opening of the first connection between Rafina and Crete. From the following year, the ferry then returned to operate only on the connections between Rafina and the Cyclades.

On 11 October 2021 it was sold to Seajets and, renamed Superstar, continued to operate on the same route throughout 2022. However, in 2023, after 30 years of service on the connections between Rafina and the Cyclades, it was transferred to the connections between Volos, Skiathos, Skopelos and Alonissos, in the Sporades.

== Accidents and incidents ==
On 12 September 2016, the ro-ro passenger ferry Superferry II allided with the quay at the port of Gavrio on Andros Island, Greece. The vessel was attempting to berth after arriving from Tinos with 200 passengers on board.

The impact caused structural damage to the vessel's aft steering compartment, resulting in water ingress. No injuries were reported among the passengers or crew, and there was no environmental pollution. Passengers were subsequently transferred to another ferry to reach their destinations, while the Superferry II was detained by port authorities at Gavrio to undergo necessary hull repairs.
