= HSC Golden Princess =

High speed RoRo ferry

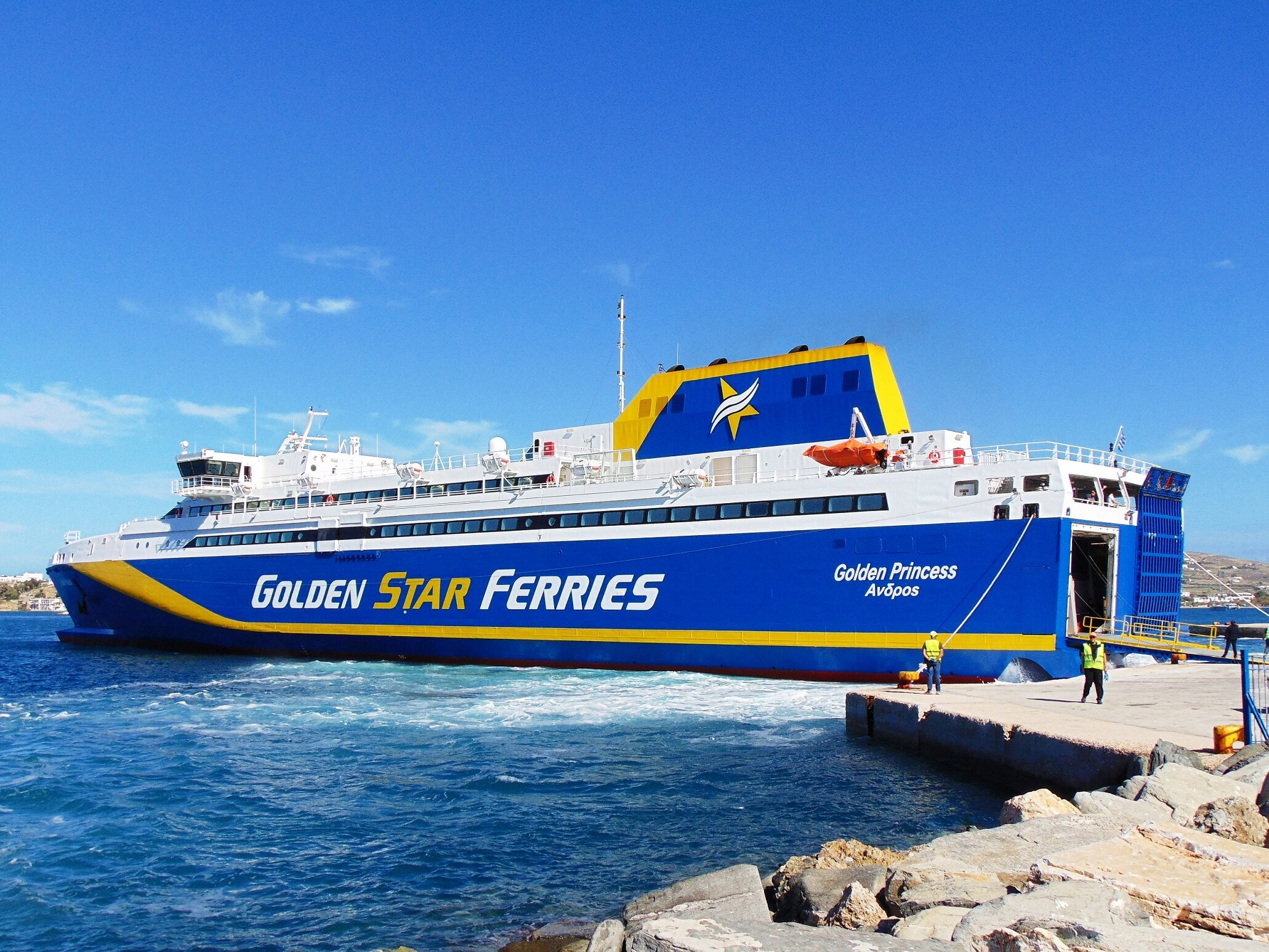
- Golden Princess in Paros

History
- Name: Gotlandia II (2006–2023); Golden Princess (2023–Present)
- Owner: Destination Gotland (2006–2023); Golden Star Ferries (2023–Present)
- Operator: Destination Gotland (2006–2023)
- Port of registry: Visby, Sweden (2006–2023); Andros Greece (2023–Present)
- Ordered: July 19, 2004
- Builder: Fincantieri, Italy
- Yard number: 6128
- Laid down: February 28, 2005
- Launched: December 30, 2005
- Christened: April 18, 2006
- Completed: 2006
- In service: July 6, 2006
- Identification: IMO number: 9328015
- Status: Moored at Piraeus

General characteristics
- Type: fast ferry
- Tonnage: 6,554 GT; 578 DWT
- Length: 122 m (400 ft 3 in)
- Beam: 16.65 m (54 ft 8 in)
- Draught: 3.33 m (10 ft 11 in)
- Installed power: 4x MAN B&W RK 280, 36.000 kW
- Speed: 32 knots (59.26 km/h; 36.82 mph)
- Capacity: 780 passengers; 160 cars

HSC Golden Princess (formerly Gotlandia II) is a fast ferry ordered by the Swedish company Destination Gotland and acquired by Greek company Golden Star Ferries in 2023. It was built by Fincantieri, Italy in 2006. It was used on Destination Gotland's routes Nynäshamn-Visby and Oskarshamn-Visby until it was sold to Golden Star Ferries. The ferry can carry up to 780 passengers and has a waterjet propulsion system that allows speeds up to 35 knots. In March 2023 she was sold to Golden Star Ferries and in April 2023 she was renamed Golden Princess.

== 2009 Collision ==
On July 23, 2009 Gotlandia II and another Destination Gotland ferry, the MS Gotland, collided outside Nynäshamn. The Gotlandia II received heavy damage to its superstructure and 5 people were rushed to a hospital. It was later announced that the ferry would be out of service for the rest of the season. Two days after the collision Gotlandia II sailed to Norrköping, where it was laid up until a shipyard that can take the ship in for repairs was found. By January 2011 the ship was back in service.
