= Golden Star Ferries =

Greek ferry company

- Founded: 2011
- Headquarters: Andros, Greece
- Area served: Greece, Cyclades
- Services: Passenger transportation Freight transportation
- Website: www.goldenstarferries.gr

Golden Star Ferries is a Greek ferry company operating from the Greek mainland to the Cyclades islands in the Aegean Sea. Golden Star Ferries was founded in 2011 by Andriot brothers Giorgos and Dimitris Stephanou, who also own the Bright Navigation shipping freight company.

== Current fleet ==
Golden Star Ferries currently operates a fleet of four ships, one of which is a high-speed craft.

Ship	Flag	Built	Entered service	Gross tonnage	Length	Width	Passengers	Vehicles	Knots	Photos
Superferry	(Greece)	1995	2016	4.258 GT	121 m	20 m	1.760	300	23	
SuperExpress	(Greece)	1998	2019	5.903 GT	91 m	26 m	900	220	42	
Andros Queen	(Greece)	1998	2023	7.005 GT	134 m	21 m	1.400	390	22	
Golden Princess	(Greece)	2006	2026	6.554 GT	122 m	16,65 m	780	160	35	
Andros King	(Greece)	2006	2026	12.895 GT	130,45 m	21 m	1.400	310	24,5	

== Former fleet ==
- Superferry II (2011–2021)
- Super Runner (2017–2021)
- Super Speed (2018–2021)
- Super Cat (2018-2021)

== The Legend of Rafina ==
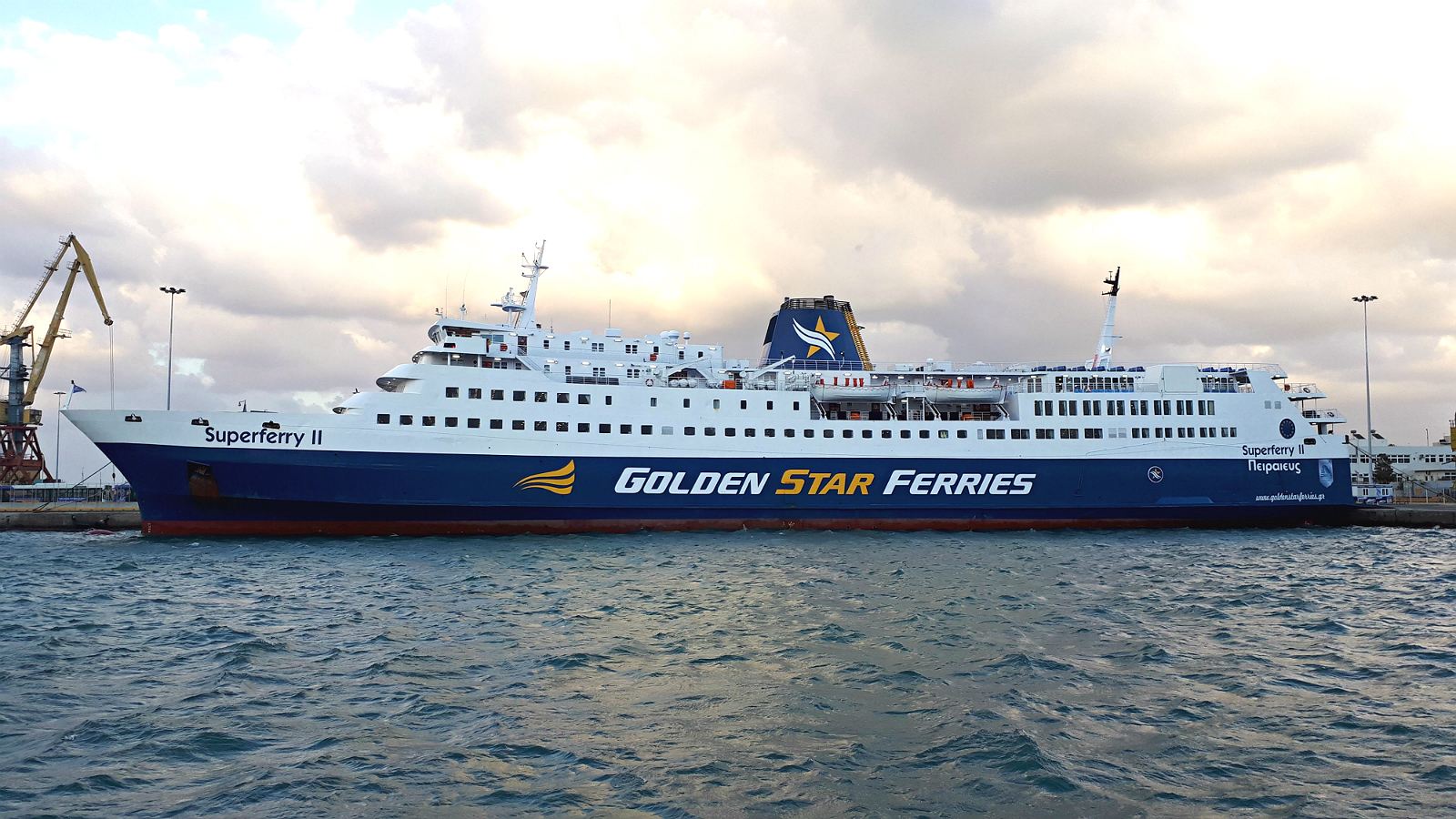
Superferry II at Heraklion.

The legend of Rafina or known to the public as Superferry II was one of the most important Greek ferries that sailed on the route Rafina-Andros-Tinos-Mykonos. Superferry II was built as Prince Laurent at the Cockerill Yards for Regie voor Maritiem Transport and sailed for many different companies until Strintzis Lines bought it in order to renew their aging fleet with new and more efficient ships. In 1999 the ship moves to the hands of the newly created Blue Ferries (known today as Blue Star Ferries) which was created by Strintzis Lines as their subsidiary company. In March 2011, the ferry was sold to the then newly founded Golden Star Ferries ferry company. For 10 straight years, the ship sailed in the same route. In its 28th year of service, Golden Star Ferries decided to stop using the ship and sold it to the Seajets company. Now the ship is on its 29th year of service and still remains at the port of Rafina.

== Routes ==
- Rafina-Andros-Tinos-Mykonos (Superferry)
- Paros-Mykonos-Tinos-Andros-Rafina (Andros Queen)
- Rafina-Tinos-Mykonos-Paros-Ios-Thira (Super Express)
