= Panagia Pantobasilissa Church, Rafina =

Church building in Rafina, Greece

Coordinates: 38.0202°N 24.0063°E

Panagia Pantobasilissa
- Παναγια Παντοβασιλισσα
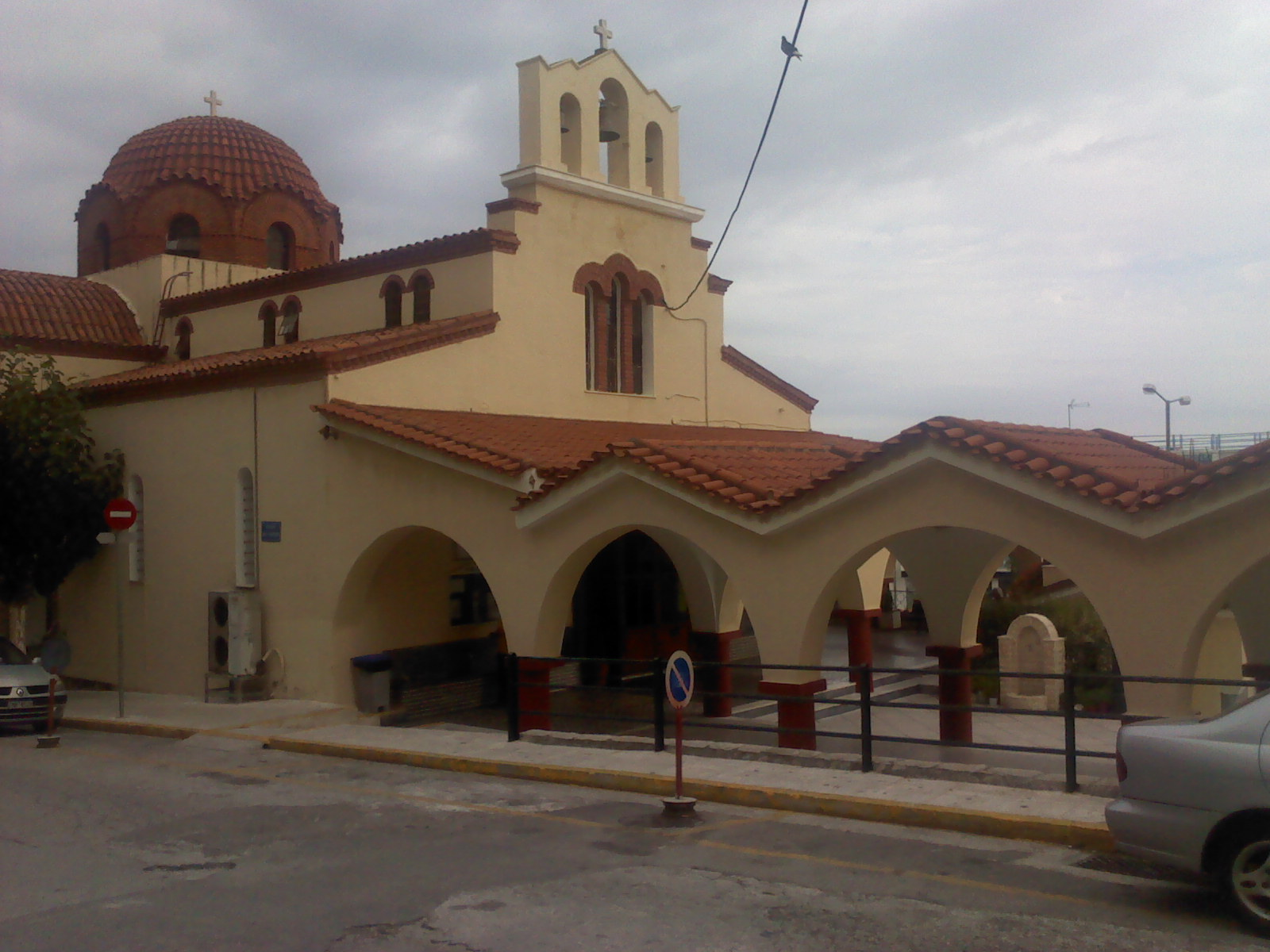

Religion
- Affiliation: Christianity
- Year consecrated: 8 September 1956

Location
- Location: Rafina, Greece
- Country: Greece
- Interactive map of Panagia Pantobasilissa

Architecture
- Type: Church
- Style: Byzantine architecture

Website
- www.pantovasilissa.gr

Panagia Pantobasilissa (Greek: Παναγία Παντοβασίλισσα, "Panagia the Queen of All") is a Greek Orthodox church and one of the churches in Rafina, Greece. Panagia Pantobasilissa's church was built in remembrance of the Byzantine church in Tirilye which hold the same name. Feast Day: 8 September

== See also ==
- Panagia Pantobasilissa Church, Tirilye
