= Rafina-Pikermi =

Rafina-Pikermi Ραφήνα-Πικέρμι
- Municipality
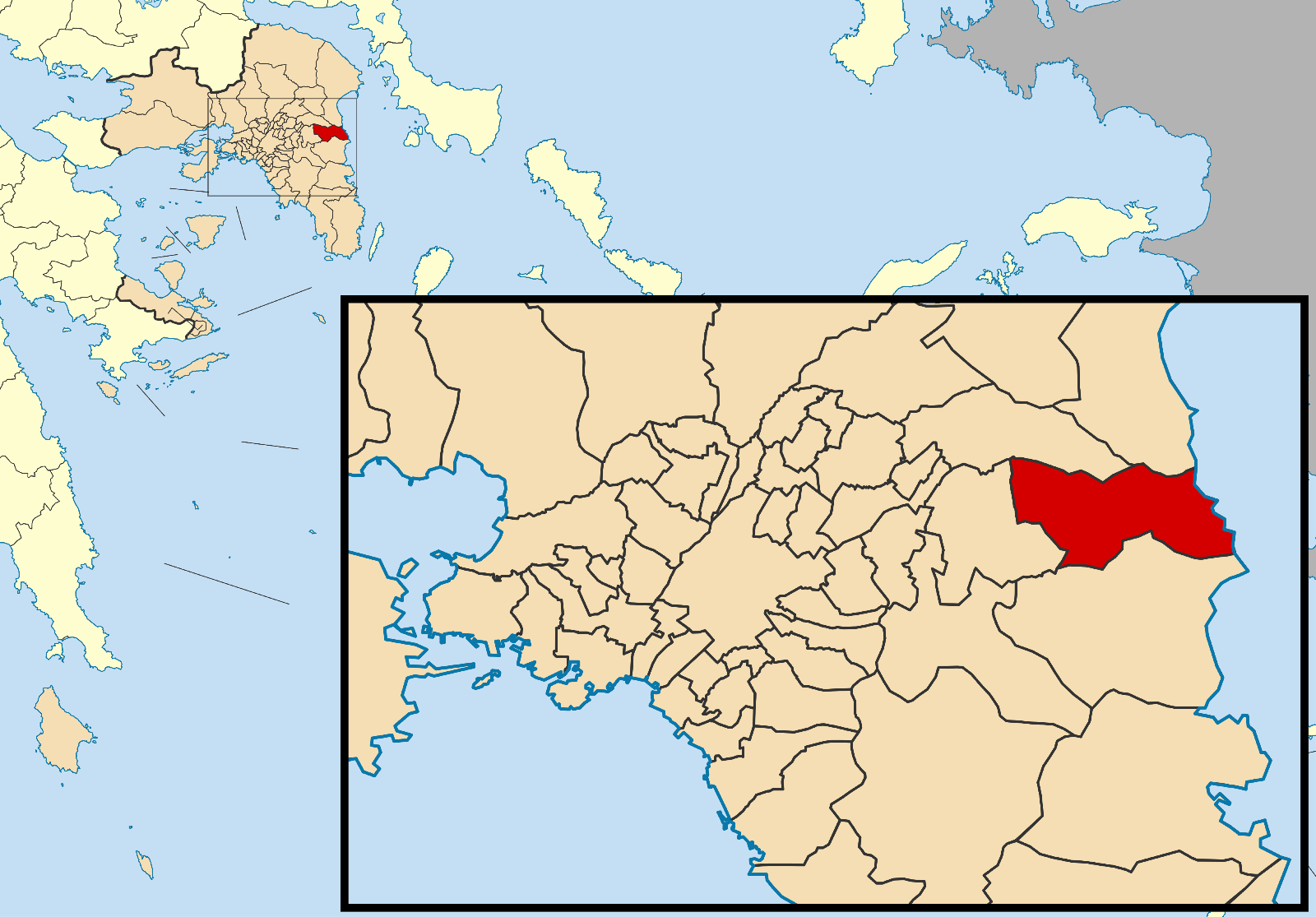

- Location within Greece
- Coordinates: 38°01′N 24°00′E
- Country: Greece
- Administrative region: Attica
- Regional unit: East Attica

Area
  - Municipality: 40.501 km^{2} (15.638 sq mi)

Population (2021)
  - Municipality: 22,327
  - Density: 551.27/km^{2} (1,427.8/sq mi)
- Time zone: UTC+2 (EET)
  - Summer (DST): UTC+3 (EEST)

Rafina-Pikermi (Greek: Ραφήνα-Πικέρμι) is a municipality in the East Attica regional unit, Attica, Greece. The seat of the municipality is the town Rafina. The municipality has an area of 40.501 km^{2}.

== Municipality ==
The municipality Rafina-Pikermi was formed at the 2011 local government reform by the merger of the following 2 former municipalities, that became municipal units:

- Pikermi
- Rafina
