= Rafina =

Town in Attica, Greece

Rafina Ραφήνα
- Municipal unit
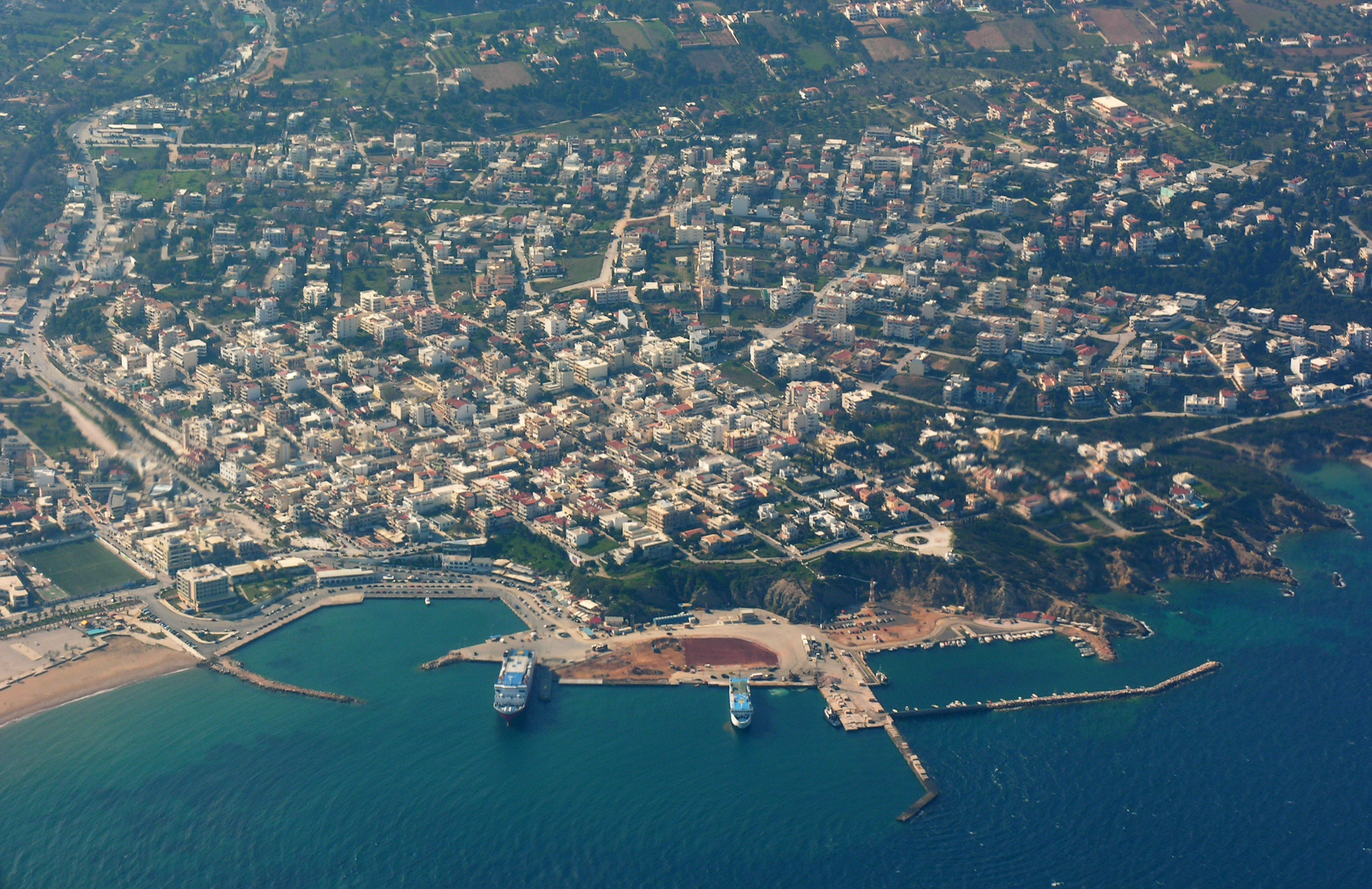
- Aerial view of Rafina's harbour

- Location within the regional unit

- Location within Greece
- Coordinates: 38°1′N 24°0′E
- Country: Greece
- Administrative region: Attica
- Regional unit: East Attica
- Municipality: Rafina-Pikermi

Area
  - Municipal unit: 18.979 km^{2} (7.328 sq mi)
- Elevation: 29 m (95 ft)

Population (2021)
  - Municipal unit: 14,620
  - Municipal unit density: 770.3/km^{2} (1,995/sq mi)
- Time zone: UTC+2 (EET)
  - Summer (DST): UTC+3 (EEST)
- Postal code: 190 09
- Area code: 22940
- Vehicle registration: Z
- Website: www.rafina.gr

Rafina (Greek: Ραφήνα) is a suburban port town located on the eastern coast of Attica in Greece. It has a population of 14,620 inhabitants (2021 census). Since the 2011 local government reform it has been part of the municipality Rafina-Pikermi, of which it is the seat and a municipal unit. The municipal unit has an area of 18.979 km^{2}. It is part of the Athens metropolitan area.

== Geography ==
Rafina lies on the Aegean Sea coast, east of Mount Pentelicus and northeast of the Mesogaia plain. It is 5 km (3 mi) north of Artemida, 7 km (4 mi) south of Nea Makri and 25 km (16 mi) east of Athens city centre. The municipal unit of Rafina contains, besides the city itself, a large portion of the surrounding area, which is mostly woodland and farmland. The only other town is Kallitechnoupoli.

Rafina is a port town serving ferries to the southern part of Euboea as well as most of the Cyclades. Its port acts as the second port of Athens, after the Athens' port of Piraeus.

== History ==
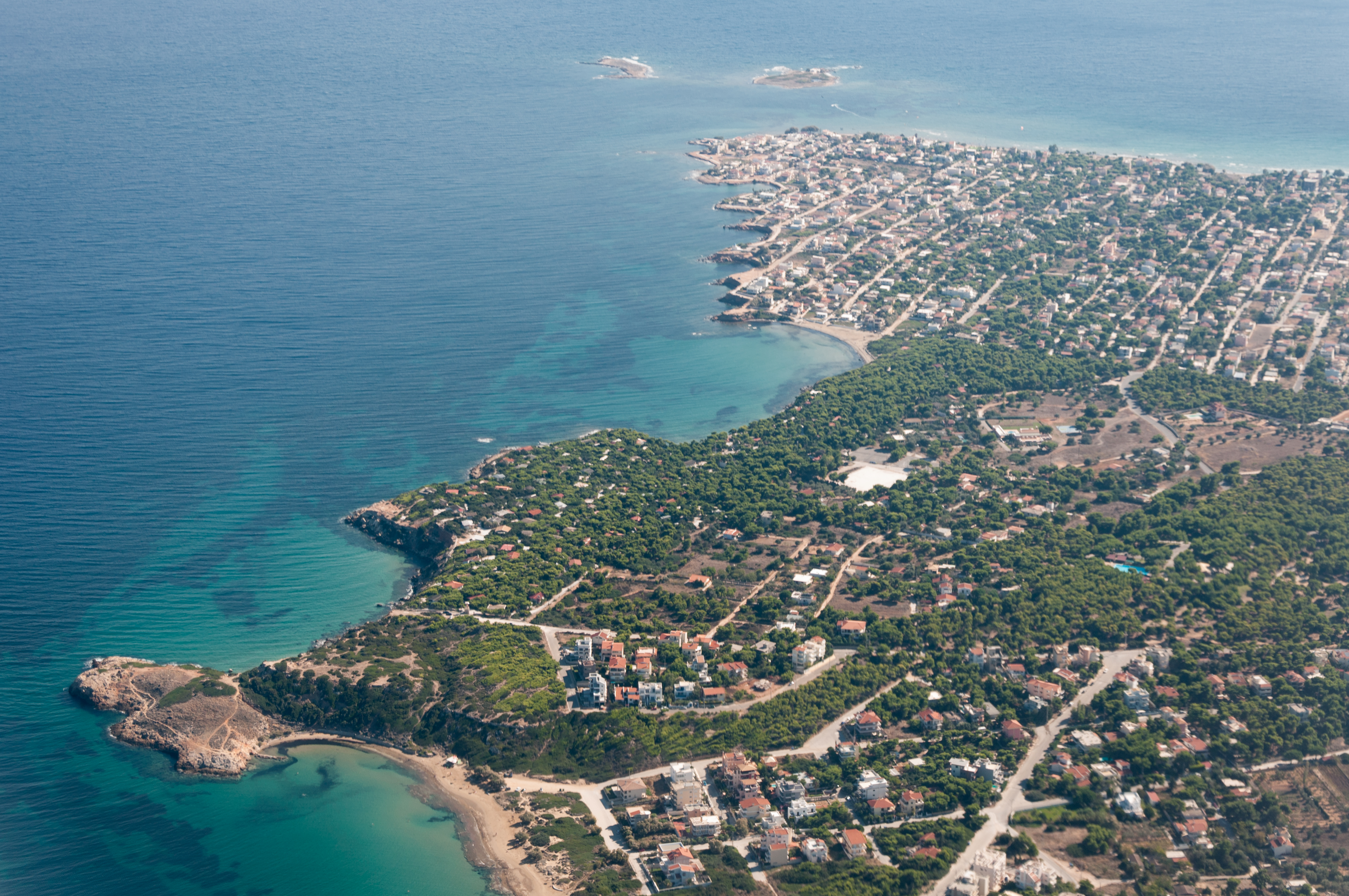
Aerial view

Rafina suffered damage from a forest fire in July 2005 and again in 2018.

=== Historical population ===
Year	Town population	Municipality population
1981	4,994	–
1991	8,282	8,611
2001	10,173	10,701
2011	12,168	13,091
2021	13,604	14,620

== Culture ==
=== Sports ===
Rafina is the seat of two football clubs with presence in third national division (Gamma Ethniki), Triglia Rafina club founded in 1932 by refugees, and Thyella Rafina club founded in 1957.

Sport clubs based in Rafina
Club	Founded	Sports	Achievements
Triglia Rafina F.C.	1932	Football	Earlier presence in Gamma Ethniki
Thyella Rafina F.C.	1957	Football	Presence in Gamma Ethniki

== Notable residents ==
- Robert Pires (French footballer)
- Kostas Karamanlis, former Greek prime minister
- Simon Rrumbullaku Albanian-Greek football player.

== International relations ==
Rafina is twinned with:

- Pano Lefkara, Cyprus
- Tirilye, Turkey
- (Greece) Triglia, Chalkidiki

== See also ==
- List of municipalities of Attica
- Panagia Pantobasilissa church, Rafina
