= GNV Atlas =

Ferry operated by GNV

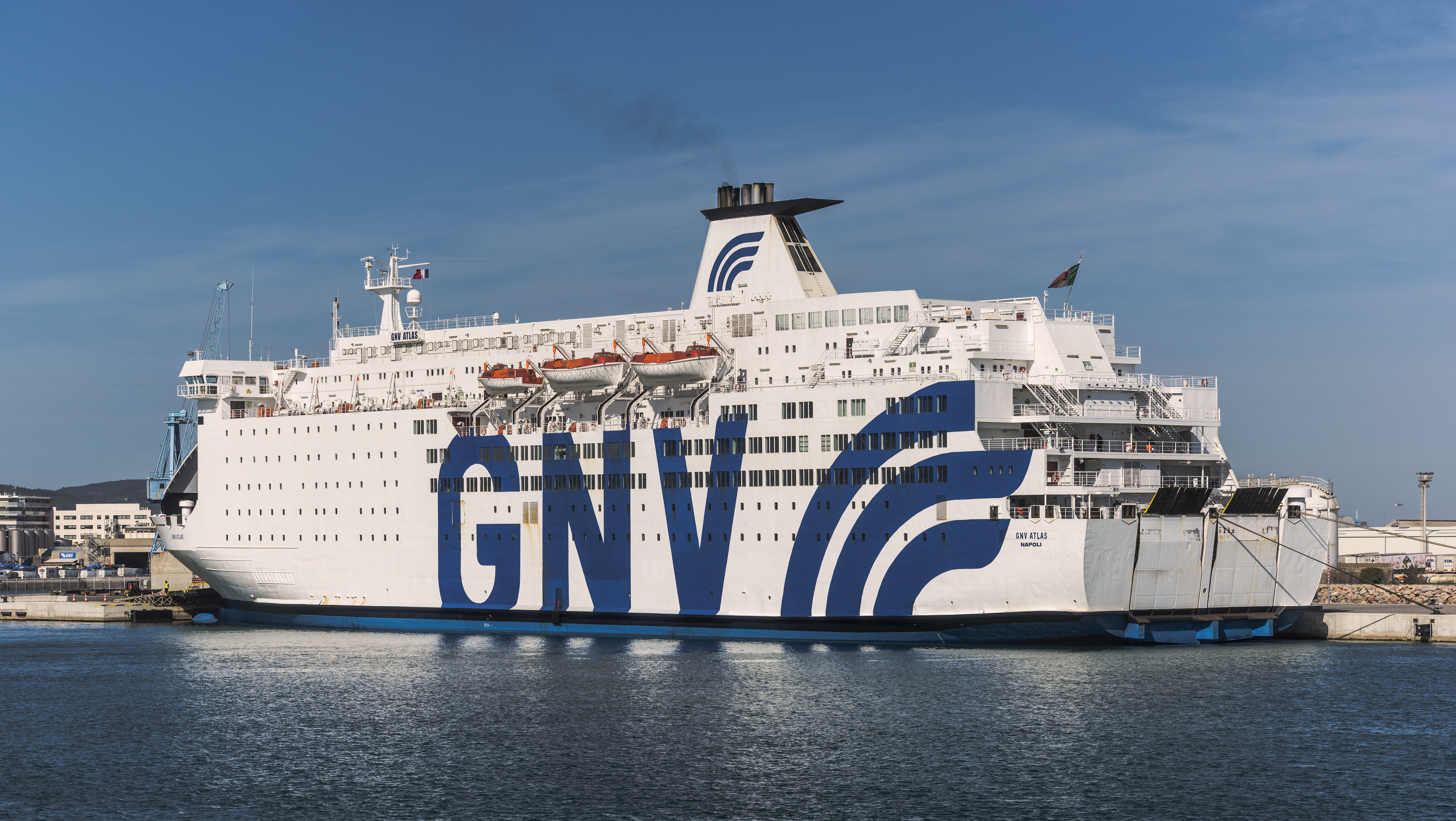
- GNV Atlas in Sete

History
- Name: Olau Britannia (1989–1994); Pride of Portsmouth (1994–2005); SNAV Lazio (2005–2017); GNV Atlas (2017 – present)
- Owner: TT-Line (1989–2005); SNAV (2005–2015); GNV (2015 – present)
- Operator: Olau Line (1989–1994); P&O European Ferries (1994–1999); P&O Portsmouth (1999–2002); P&O Ferries (2002–2005); SNAV (2005 – present)
- Port of registry: Germany, Hamburg (1989–1993); Luxembourg, Luxembourg (1993); Germany, Hamburg (1993–1994); United Kingdom, Portsmouth (1994–2006); Italy, Naples (2006–present)
- Builder: Schichau Seebeckwerft AG
- Yard number: 1068
- Launched: 28 October 1989
- Acquired: 16 May 1990
- Maiden voyage: 21 May 1990
- Identification: IMO number: 8712520; MMSI number: 247163100; Call sign: IBUH

General characteristics
- Class & type: Peter Pan class cruiseferry
- Tonnage: 33,336 GT; 5,200 DWT
- Length: 161.00 m (528 ft 3 in)
- Beam: 29.00 m (95 ft 2 in)
- Draught: 6.50 m (21 ft 4 in)
- Installed power: 4 × Zgoda-Sulzer 8ZA40S diesels; combined 18,638 kW
- Propulsion: 2 propellers; 2 bow thrusters
- Speed: 21.3 knots (39.4 km/h; 24.5 mph)
- Capacity: 1,716 passengers; 1,716 passenger berths; 575 cars; 118 trailers; 1,510 lanemeters

MV GNV Atlas is a Peter Pan-class cruiseferry currently owned and operated by the Italian shipping company SNAV. She was launched on 28 October 1989 by Schichau Seebeckwerft in Bremerhaven, West Germany as Olau Britannia for Olau Line.

Following the closure of Olau Line in 1994, Olau Britannia was chartered to P&O Ferries and renamed Pride of Portsmouth. From 2005 to 2017 she has been operating as SNAV Lazio between Civitavecchia, Palermo and Olbia.

== Concept and construction ==
Olau Line had been owned by the Germany-based TT-Line since 1979. Under TT-Line ownership, Olau Line had acquired two purpose-built ferries from Weser Seebeckwerft, Olau Hollandia and Olau Britannia for their Sheerness—Vlissingen service. During the mid-80s TT-Line acquired MS Peter Pan (1986) and MS Nils Holgersson (1986), enlarged versions of Olau Hollandia and Olau Britannia design also from Weser Seebeckwerft, for their Trelleborg—Travemünde service. During the latter half of the decade, TT-line decided to order two more ships of the Peter Pan-type, again from AG Weser Seebeckwerft in Bremerhaven, West Germany as replacements for the two Olau ships. During the build the shipyard merged with Schichau Unterweser to become Schichau Seebeckwerft. The second of these vessels was delivered in 1990 as the second Olau Britannia, replacing her older namesake.

== History ==
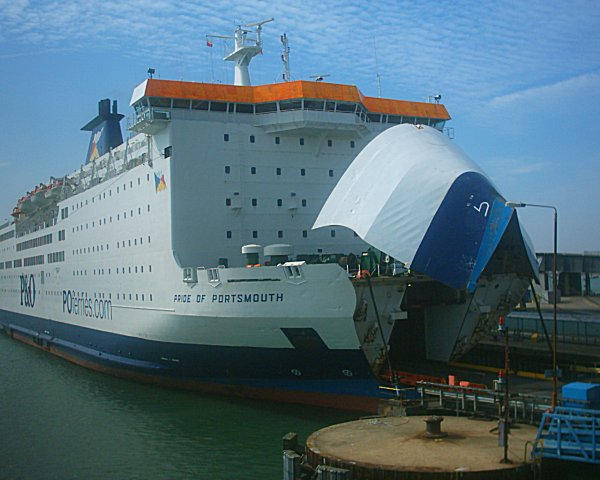
In Portsmouth, 19 March 2005

The new Olau Hollandia and Olau Britannia were more than twice the size of the old ships with the same names, and they soon proved to be too large for the route they were built for. Due to high operating costs the ships were taken out of the German ship registry and registered in Luxembourg in January 1993, but action from the German Seamen's Union forced the ships to be re-registered in Germany just a month later. In 1994 TT-Line made plans to move the ships under Bahamian flag, but when the German Seamen's Union protested again, TT-Line decided to close down Olau Line in May 1994.

Following the closure of Olau Line, TT-Line chartered the two vessels to P&O European Ferries and Olau Britannia was consequently renamed Pride of Portsmouth to fit with P&O's branding policy at the time and re-registered to the United Kingdom. Initially both Pride of Portsmouth and the renamed Pride of Le Havre entered service on the Portsmouth to Cherbourg route whilst new deeper berths were completed at Le Havre. When these were completed, P&O transferred the two to the Portsmouth to Le Havre route on 22 June 1994. This service continued largely unchanged until 2005.

On 28 September 2004 P&O Ferries announced plans to charter Pride of Portsmouth and her sister Pride of Le Havre to Brittany Ferries. The plans came under scrutiny of the relevant competition regulators, and as a result Brittany Ferries decided not to charter the ships. They remained in P&O Ferries service until 30 September 2005, when they were withdrawn from service and subsequently laid up on the River Fal as this proved to be more cost effective than continuing the service until the end of December.

In November 2005 TT-Line sold Pride of Portsmouth and Pride of Le Havre to the Italy-based SNAV. On 30 December 2005, Pride of Portsmouth was renamed SNAV Lazio, but she retained United Kingdom flag for the time being. On 5 January 2006 SNAV Lazio left Falmouth for Naples. On 27 March 2006 she was re-registered in Italy, and in May of the same year she entered service on SNAV's routes from Civitavecchia to Palermo and Olbia.

== Collision with HMS St Albans ==
Damage to Pride of Portsmouth's starboard bow following collision

In the early hours of 27 October 2002, during high winds of between 35 and 40 knots (65 and 74 km/h; 40 and 46 mph) and gusts reaching 70 knots (130 km/h; 81 mph) within Portsmouth Harbour, Pride of Portsmouth collided with the warship, HMS St Albans moored at the end of Fountain Lake Jetty during her turn into Fountain Lake. The collision was the result of a combination of factors, most notably the high wind speeds at the time. The Marine Accident Investigation Board determined that along with the high winds, an inappropriate helm order and the failure of a bow thruster prior to the incident had allowed Pride of Portsmouth to pass close to the warship HMS Ocean and then make a starboard turn, which was accelerated by the high winds and lee from HMS Ocean towards HMS St Albans.

St Albans was at the time, yet to enter full operational service having been commissioned in June 2002. She was substantially damaged in the collision, including several parts of the deck and gun decks, sea boat supports and the port bridge wing. In comparison, Pride of Portsmouth sustained only superficial damage including a small gash on her bow. She was consequently taken out of service for repairs to be made.

== Sister ships ==
Olau Britannia was the fourth of four sisters in the AG Weser Seebeckwerft designed Peter Pan class, the others being:

MS Peter Pan (1986) was the first of the sisters built by AG Weser Seebeckwerft, Bremerhaven, Germany for TT-Line. She was sold in 1990 to Spirit of Tasmania and in 1993 renamed as the first Spirit of Tasmania. She was sold in 2002 to Nordsjøferger and charted in 2003 to Fjord Line as MS Fjord Norway. In 2006 she was sold to DFDS Seaways to serve the IJmuiden (Netherlands)–Newcastle (Britain) route as MS Princess of Norway. In 2011 she was renamed MS Princess Seaways.

MS Nils Holgersson (1987) was the second of the sisters built by AG Weser Seebeckwerft, Bremerhaven, Germany for TT-Line. She was sold to Brittany Ferries in 1993 and renamed MS Val de Loire. In late 2005 she was sold to DFDS Seaways to serve the IJmuiden (Netherlands)–Newcastle (Britain) route as MS King of Scandinavia, subsequently renamed in 2011 as MS King Seaways.

MS Olau Hollandia (1989) was the third of the vessels and built by Schichau Seebeckwerft, Bremerhaven, Germany for TT-Line's sister company Olau Line to an improved design. With her Olau sister MS Olau Britannia she was charted in 1994 to P&O Ferries and renamed MS Pride of Le Havre. In 2005 she stopped operating for P&O and was subsequently sold to SNAV in Italy and renamed MS SNAV Sardegna.

The former MS Koningin Beatrix (1986), sold in 1989 to Stena Line and renamed in 2002 as MS Stena Baltica, was built by the Dutch shipyard Van der Giessen de Noord for SMZ to a similar basic design supplied by A.G. Weser.
