= MS Olau Britannia =

Two ships have been named Olau Britannia:

- MS Olau Britannia (1981), in service 1982–1990
- MS Olau Britannia (1989), in service 1990–1994
