= MS Olau Hollandia =

MS Olau Hollandia has been the name of two Olau Line cruiseferries:

- MS Olau Hollandia (1980), in service 1981–1989
- MS Olau Hollandia (1989), in service 1989–1994
