= GNV Cristal =

Ferry operated by GNV

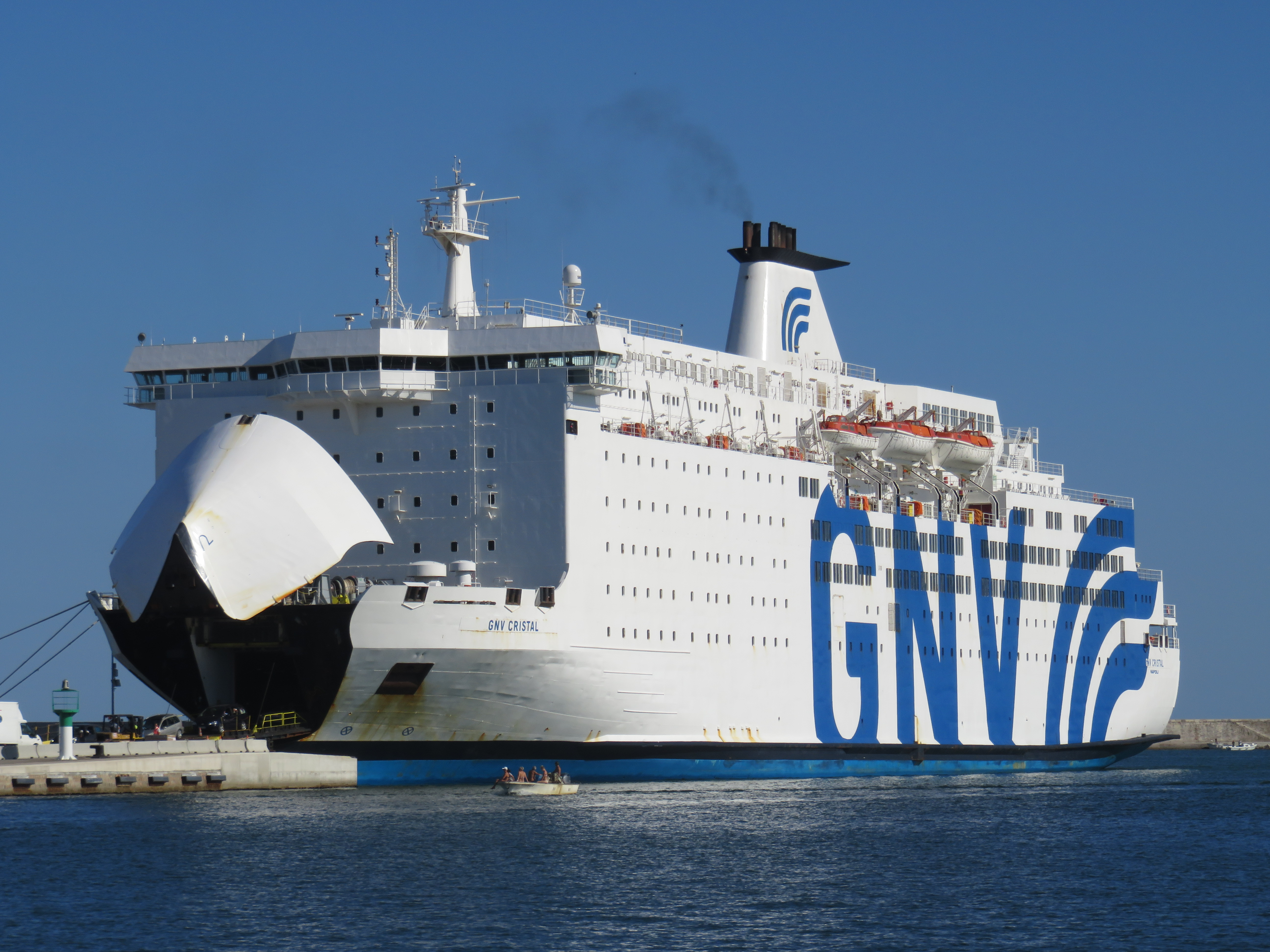
- GNV Cristal in the French port of Sète

History
- Name: 1989–1994: Olau Hollandia; 1994–2005: Pride of Le Havre; 2005–2017: SNAV Sardegna; 2017–present: GNV Cristal
- Owner: 1989–1994: Olau Line (TT-Line); 1994–2005: P&O European Ferries; 2005–2017: SNAV; 2017–present: Grandi Navi Veloci (GNV)
- Operator: 1989–1994: Olau Line; 1994–2005: P&O Ferries; 2005–2017: SNAV; 2017–present: Grandi Navi Veloci
- Port of registry: 1989–1994: Hamburg, Germany; 1994–2005: Portsmouth, United Kingdom; 2005–present: Napoli, Italy
- Route: Naples – Palermo; Civitavecchia – Palermo; Civitavecchia - Annaba; Annaba - Civitavecchia; Former: Sheerness – Vlissingen; Former: Portsmouth – Le Havre
- Ordered: 1987
- Builder: Schichau Seebeckwerft; Bremerhaven, Germany
- Yard number: 1068
- Laid down: 1988
- Launched: 25 February 1989
- Completed: September 1989
- Acquired: 2017 (by GNV)
- Maiden voyage: 4 October 1989
- In service: 1989
- Identification: IMO number: 8712518; Call sign: IBUB; MMSI number: 247163900
- Status: in service
- Notes: Sister ship to GNV Atlas

General characteristics
- Class & type: Peter Pan class (Modified Olau subclass)
- Tonnage: 33,336 GT; 4,100 DWT
- Length: 161.00 m (528 ft 3 in)
- Beam: 29.00 m (95 ft 2 in)
- Draught: 6.50 m (21 ft 4 in)
- Depth: 8.10 m (26 ft 7 in)
- Decks: 12
- Ramps: Bow and stern loading ramps
- Ice class: 1B
- Installed power: 4 × Zgoda-Sulzer 8ZA40S main diesel engines (total 19,600 kW / 26,280 hp)
- Propulsion: 2 × controllable pitch propellers
- Speed: 21.0 knots (38.9 km/h; 24.2 mph) (service)
- Capacity: 2,000 passengers (357 cabins / 1,720 berths); 575 cars / 90 freight vehicles
- Crew: 60–80

MS GNV Cristal is a cruiseferry owned by the Italy-based SNAV and operated by their Grandi Navi Veloci brand. She was built in 1989 by Schichau Seebeckwerft in Bremerhaven, West Germany as MS Olau Hollandia for Olau Line. From 1994 to 2005 she sailed as MS Pride of Le Havre for P&O Ferries. From 2005 to 2017 she operated as the SNAV Sardegna between Civitavecchia, Palermo and Olbia.

== Concept and construction ==
Olau Line had been owned by the Germany-based TT-Line since 1979. Under TT-Line ownership, Olau Line had acquired two purpose-built ferries from Weser Seebeckwerft, Olau Hollandia and Olau Britannia for their Sheerness—Vlissingen service. During the mid-80s TT-Line acquired MS Peter Pan and MS Nils Holgersson, enlarged versions of Olau Hollandia and Olau Britannia design also from Weser Seebeckwerft, for their Trelleborg—Travemünde service. During the latter half of the decade, TT-line decided to order two more ships of the Peter Pan-type, again from Weser Seebeckwerft in Bremerhaven, West Germany as replacements for the two Olau ships. During the build the shipyard merged with Schichau Unterweser to become Schichau Seebeckwerft. The first of these ships was delivered in 1989 as the second Olau Hollandia, replacing her older namesake.

== Service history ==
=== 1989–1994: Olau Hollandia ===
The second Olau Hollandia was delivered to TT-Line on 29 September 1989, and five days later she entered service on Olau Line's service between Sheerness and Vlissingen. On entering service she replaced the first MS Olau Hollandia (1980). The Olau Hollandia's sister, MS Olau Britannia (1990), followed a year later. In practice the new Olau Hollandia and Olau Britannia proved to be too extravagant for the service, and TT-Line was forced to look into cost-cutting measures to keep the ships running. On 6 January 1993 the Olau Hollandia was re-registered to Luxembourg, but after a series of strikes and other protests in part of the German seamen's trade union, TT-Line were forced to return the ship into German registry on 3 February 1993. Subsequently, TT-Line drew up plans for swapping the Olau ships with the ships in Trelleborg—Travemünde service, and moving the resulting new Olau ships into Bahamian registry. Another strike on board the Olau ships followed, and in May 1994 TT-Line decided to close down the Olau Line brand entirely, with the Olau Hollandia and Britannia chartered to P&O Ferries. The Olau Hollandia made her last sailing for Olau Line on 15 May 1994.

=== 1994–2005: Pride of Le Havre ===
On 6 May 1994 the Olau Hollandia was named Pride of Le Havre and re-registered to the United Kingdom, replacing an earlier Pride of Le Havre that was in turn renamed Pride of Cherbourg. Although planned for the Portsmouth—Le Havre route, she entered service on the Portsmouth—Cherbourg route The Pride of Le Havre only did one sailing to Cherbourg when she took Veterans across to celebrate the 50th Anniversary of D Day.ref. Capt.M Edward.

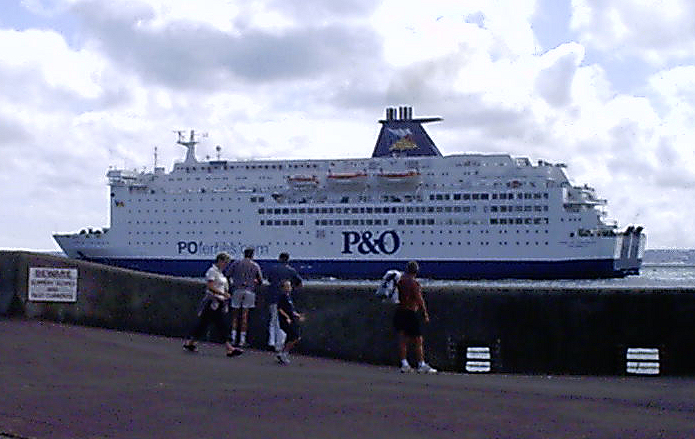
The second Pride of Le Havre photographed in 2003

While outbound from Le Havre on the evening 27 July 1998, the Pride of Le Havre suffered a switchboard explosion in the engine room, resulting in a fire in the engine room and loss of electrical power throughout the ship. Three members of the crew were seriously injured in the explosion. After the fire had been extinguished and power restored, the ship returned to Le Havre with the assistance of two tugs. The injured crewmen were transported to a local hospital, where the most seriously injured crewman died five days later. After unloading the injured crewmen the Pride of Le Havre sailed to Portsmouth, where she arrived early the next morning. In Portsmouth all passengers and cargo were unloaded and the ship itself was subsequently repaired. On 18 March 1999 the ship suffered another engine room fire. This time repairs were carried out in Southampton, and the ship was back in service on 24 March 1999.

On 28 September 2004 plans to charter the Pride of Le Havre and her sister Pride of Portsmouth to Brittany Ferries were made public. The plans came under scrutiny of the relevant competition regulators, and as a result Brittany Ferries decided not to charter the ships. They remained in P&O Ferries service until 30 September 2005, when they were withdrawn from service and subsequently laid up on the River Fal.

=== 2006–2017: SNAV Sardegna ===
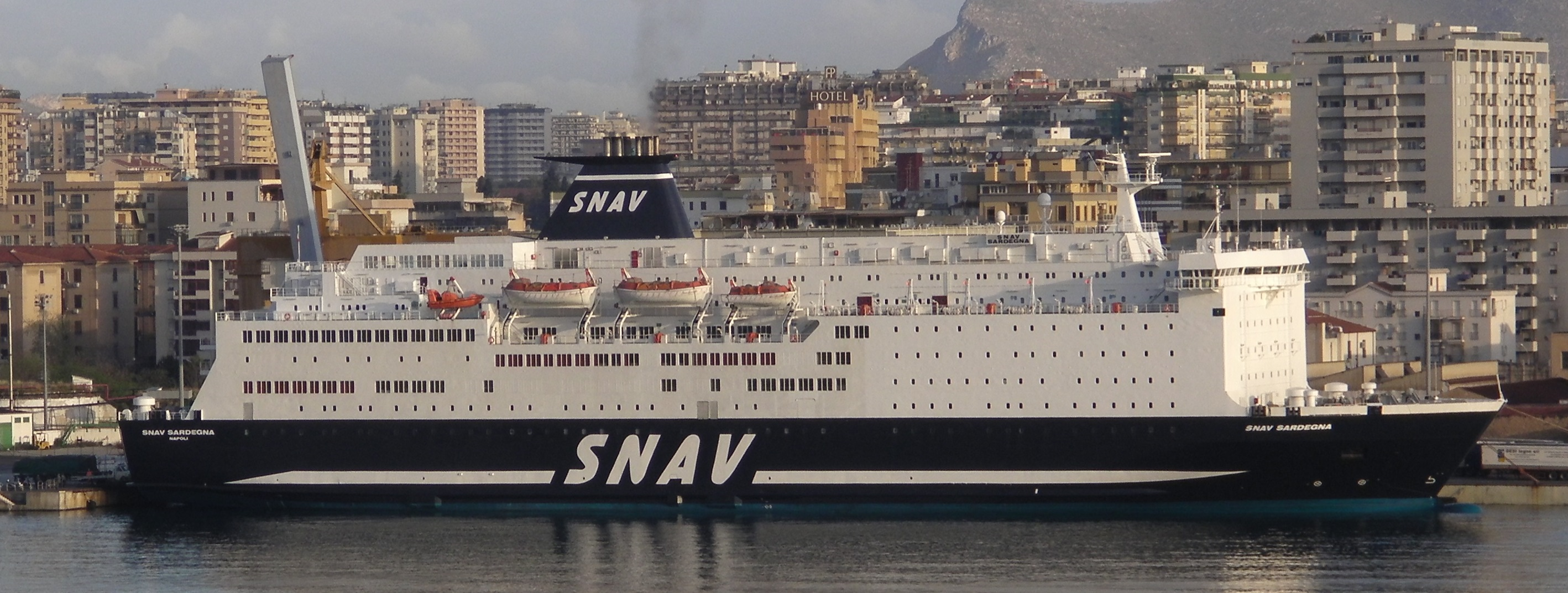
SNAV Sardegna in 2011 docked in Palermo, Italy

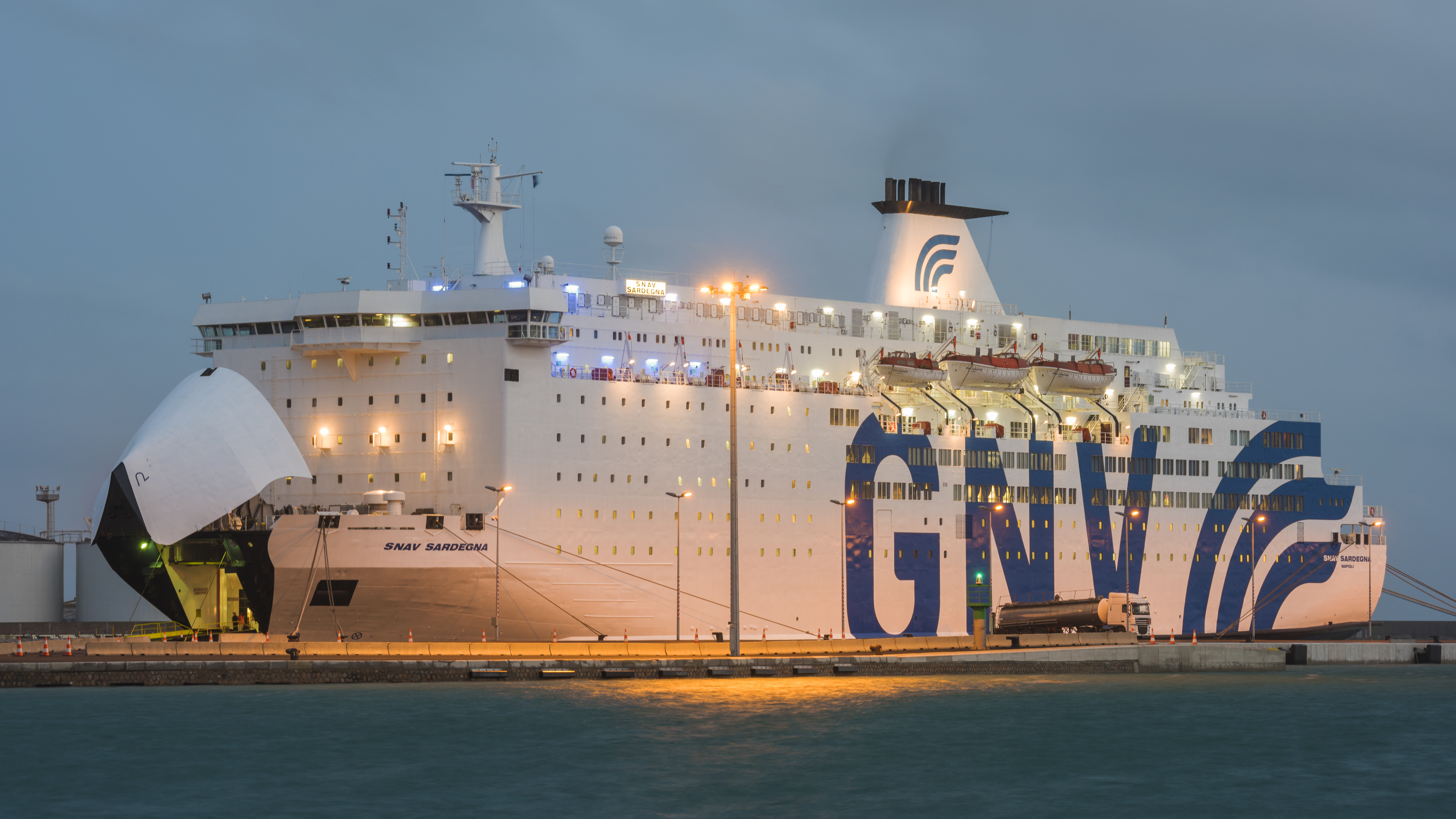
SNAV Sardegna in 2015 before the name change with GNV livery in Sète, France

In November 2005 TT-Line sold the Pride of Le Havre and Pride of Portsmouth to the Italy-based SNAV. On 30 December 2005 the Pride of Le Havre was renamed SNAV Sardegna, but she retained United Kingdom flag for the time being. On 5 January 2006 the SNAV Sardegna left Falmouth for Naples. On 27 March 2006 she was re-registered in Italy, and in May of the same year she entered service on SNAV's routes from Civitavecchia to Palermo and Olbia.

=== 2017–Present: GNV Cristal ===
SNAV Sardegna was renamed GNV Cristal on February 24, 2017. Grandi Navi Veloci and SNAV are both subsidiaries of MSC Group and merged in 2010.

== Sister ships ==
The Olau Britannia was the third of four sisters in the Peter Pan class, the others being:

MS Peter Pan (1986) was the first of the sisters built by Weser Seebeckwerft, Bremerhaven, Germany for TT-Line. She was sold in 1990 to Spirit of Tasmania and in 1993 renamed as the first Spirit of Tasmania. She was sold in 2002 to Nordsjøferger and chartered in 2003 to Fjord Line as MS Fjord Norway. In 2006 she was sold to DFDS Seaways to serve the IJmuiden, The Netherlands–Newcastle, England route as MS Princess of Norway. In 2011 she was renamed MS Princess Seaways.

MS Nils Holgersson (1987) was the second of the sisters built by AG Weser Seebeckwerft, Bremerhaven, Germany for TT-Line. She was sold to Brittany Ferries in 1993 and renamed MS Val de Loire. In late 2005 she was sold to DFDS Seaways to serve the IJmuiden, The Netherlands–Newcastle, England route as MS King of Scandinavia, subsequently renamed in 2011 as MS King Seaways.

MS Olau Britannia (1990) was the fourth of the vessels and built by Schichau Unterweser, Bremerhaven, Germany for TT-Line's sister company Olau Line to a slightly modified design. With her Olau sister the MS Olau Hollandia (1989) she was chartered in 1994 to P&O Ferries and renamed MS Pride of Portsmouth. In 2005 she stopped operating for P&O and was subsequently sold to SNAV in Italy and renamed MS SNAV Lazio.

The former MS Koningin Beatrix (1986), sold in 1989 to Stena Line and renamed in 2002 as MS Stena Baltica, and now SNAV Adriatico, was built by the Dutch shipyard Van der Giessen de Noord for SMZ to a similar design, supplied by A.G. Weser.
