= Princess Seaways =

Danish cruiseferry built in 1986

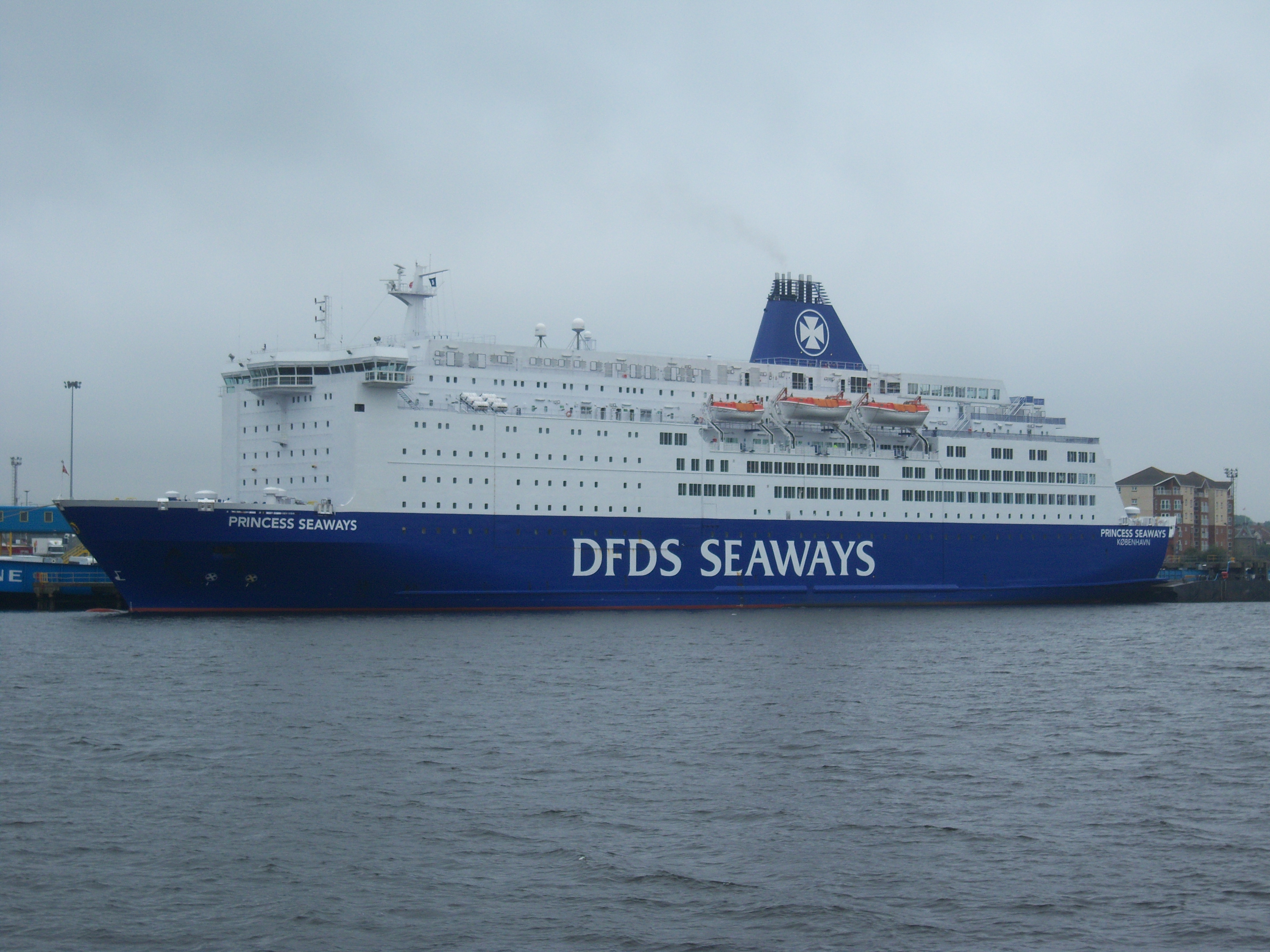
- Princess Seaways docked on the River Tyne in September 2014.

History
- Name: 1986–1993: Peter Pan; 1993–2002: Spirit of Tasmania; 2002–2003: Spir; 2003–2006: Fjord Norway; 2006–2011: Princess of Norway; 2011 onwards: Princess Seaways
- Owner: 1986–1993: TT-Line; 1993–2002: Spirit of Tasmania; 2002–2006: Nordsjøferger; 2006 onwards: DFDS Seaways
- Operator: 1986–1993: TT-Line; 1993–2002: Spirit of Tasmania; 2003–2006: Fjord Line; 2006 onwards: DFDS Seaways
- Port of registry: 1986–1993: Hamburg, Germany; 1993–2002: Devonport Australia; 2002–2006: Bergen Norway; 2006 onwards: Copenhagen Denmark
- Route: 1986–1993: Travemünde–Trelleborg; 1993–2002: Devonport-Melbourne; 2003–2005: Bergen–Haugesund–Egersund–Hanstholm; 2005–2006: Newcastle-Bergen-Stavanger; 2006–2007: Newcastle-Stavanger-Haugesund-Bergen; 2007 onwards: IJmuiden - Newcastle
- Ordered: 1985
- Builder: Seebeckwerft
- Yard number: 1058
- Launched: 30 November 1985
- Completed: 1986
- Maiden voyage: 2 June 1986
- Identification: IMO number: 8502391; Call sign: OXED2; MMSI number: 220489000
- Status: In service

General characteristics
- Class & type: Peter Pan class cruiseferry
- Tonnage: 31,360 GT; 4,110 t DWT
- Length: 161 m
- Beam: 27.6 m
- Draft: 6.2 m
- Propulsion: 4 MAK 8M552 diesels of 19,876 kW or 26,655 hp
- Speed: 21 knots (39 km/h; 24 mph)
- Capacity: Cabin berths: 1,320; Vehicle capacity: 550 cars; Lanemetres: 1,410

Princess Seaways is a cruiseferry operated and owned by the Danish shipping company DFDS Seaways on a route connecting North Shields, England, to IJmuiden in the Netherlands. She was built in 1986 as Peter Pan by Seebeckwerft, Bremerhaven, Germany for TT-Line. Between 1993 and 2002, the ship was operated by Spirit of Tasmania of Australia under the name Spirit of Tasmania across Bass Strait. In 2002, the ship was sold to Fjord Line and renamed Fjord Norway for service from Denmark. In 2006, she was sold to DFDS Seaways and sailed as Princess of Norway before being given her current name in 2011.

== History ==
Princess Seaways was built as the Peter Pan (the third TT-Line ship to bear the name) at Seebeckwerft, Bremerhaven, in 1986. Peter Pan began operations on the Travemünde–Trelleborg route on 6 February 1986. In 1990, Spirit of Tasmania purchased it to replace the Abel Tasman. It was expected that it would be delivered in late 1992 but TT-Line could not let her go until 1993. She sailed from Germany in October 1993 and began sailing from Devonport to Melbourne in late November. She sailed four return trips a week. The crossings were overnight and one day/night and took approximately 15 hours.

In 2002, Spirit ot Tasmania secured two new ferries: the Superfast III and Superfast IV from Superfast Ferries to replace the Spirit of Tasmania and her fleet mate Devil Cat. The two new Superfasts were renamed Spirit of Tasmania I and Spirit of Tasmania II and began operations in September 2002. Having crossed Bass Strait 2,849 times, carried a total of 2.3 million passengers, 807,000 cars and 185,000 containers, the Spirit of Tasmania was laid up in Sydney and sold to Fjord Line and refitted at Ørskov Yard in Frederikshavn. She was then renamed Fjord Norway and began serving the Bergen–Haugesund–Egersund–Hanstholm route until November 2005, when she took over the Bergen–Stavanger–Newcastle route from the Jupiter.

Fjord Norway was purchased by Danish shipping company DFDS Seaways and renamed Princess of Norway; she joined the DFDS Seaways fleet in November 2006 and was refurbished at Frederikshavn and began sailing on the Newcastle-Stavanger-Haugesund-Bergen route.

Princess of Norway swapped routes with the Queen of Scandinavia in May 2007, joining her sister ship King of Scandinavia on the IJmuiden - Newcastle route. Because of the equal capacity and layout of these sister ships, caravans are accepted at every sailing. In 2011, she was renamed Princess Seaways.

== Sister ships ==
The third Peter Pan was the first of four sisters in the Peter Pan class, the others being:

Nils Holgersson' was the second of the sisters built by Seebeckwerft for TT-Line. She was sold to Brittany Ferries in 1993 and renamed Val de Loire. In late 2005 she was sold to DFDS Seaways to serve the IJmuiden–Newcastle route as King of Scandinavia, subsequently renamed in 2011 as King Seaways.

Olau Hollandia was the third of the vessels and built by Schichau Seebeckwerft for TT-Line's sister company Olau Line to a modified design. With her Olau sister Olau Britannia she was charted in 1994 to P&O Ferries and renamed Pride of Le Havre. In 2005, she stopped operating for P&O and was subsequently sold to SNAV in Italy and renamed SNAV Sardegna.

The former Koningin Beatrix, sold in 1989 to Stena Line and renamed in 2002 as Stena Baltica, was built by the Dutch shipyard Van der Giessen de Noord for SMZ to a similar basic design as the four sisters, supplied by A.G. Weser.
