= TT Line =

TT Line may refer to:

- TT-Line, a German shipping company operating between Germany and Sweden
- TT-Line Company, an Australian shipping company operating the Spirit of Tasmania service between Tasmania and Victoria
