= Seebeckwerft =

German shipbuilding company (1876–1988)

Seebeckwerft AG
- Industry: Shipbuilding
- Founded: 1876
- Defunct: 1988
- Fate: Merged
- Successor: Schichau Seebeckwerft
- Headquarters: Bremerhaven, Germany,
- Products: Merchant ships Warships; U-boats

Seebeckwerft A.G. was a German shipbuilding company, located in Bremerhaven at the mouth of the river Weser. Founded in 1876, it became one of the leading shipbuilding companies in the region.

== History ==
Seebeckwerft was founded in 1876 in Bremerhaven by Georg Seebeck (1845–1928), a young coppersmith, born in Brake at the Lower-Weser river. In 1876 Georg Seebeck founded a small metal-processing workshop in Geestemünde, a part of the city of Bremerhaven. In 1879 the first ship was constructed, a small steamer.

In 1928 the Seebeckwerft became a member of the Deschimag, a cooperation of several German shipyards under the leadership of the Bremen-shipyard A.G. Weser. After WW II the Deschimag was dissolved and Seebeckwerft became subsidiary of A.G. Weser, now named A.G. Weser Seebeckwerft.

During World War II Seebeckwerft built 16 Type IX U-boats for the Kriegsmarine.

In 1988 the company merged with Schichau Unterweser to become Schichau Seebeckwerft.

== Ships built by Seebeckwerft (selection) ==
=== Naval ships ===
==== Submarines (U-boats) ====
- 16 × Type IX submarines (1939–1944)

=== Civilian Ships ===
==== Ferries ====
Four ferries were designed and built by the yard in the 1980s for TT-Line.

- MS Olau Hollandia (1981)
- MS Olau Britannia (1982)
- MS Peter Pan (1986)
- MS Nils Holgersson (1987)

The design of Koningin Beatrix (1986) was also by A.G. Weser Seebeckwerft, but she was constructed at Van der Giessen de Noord. Her design is similar to that of Peter Pan (1986) and Nils Holgersson (1987). Two further vessels were built based on this design at what was by now the merged Schichau Seebeckwerft, Olau Hollandia (1989) and Olau Britannia (1990).
