= King Seaways =

Cruiseferry owned by DFDS Seaways

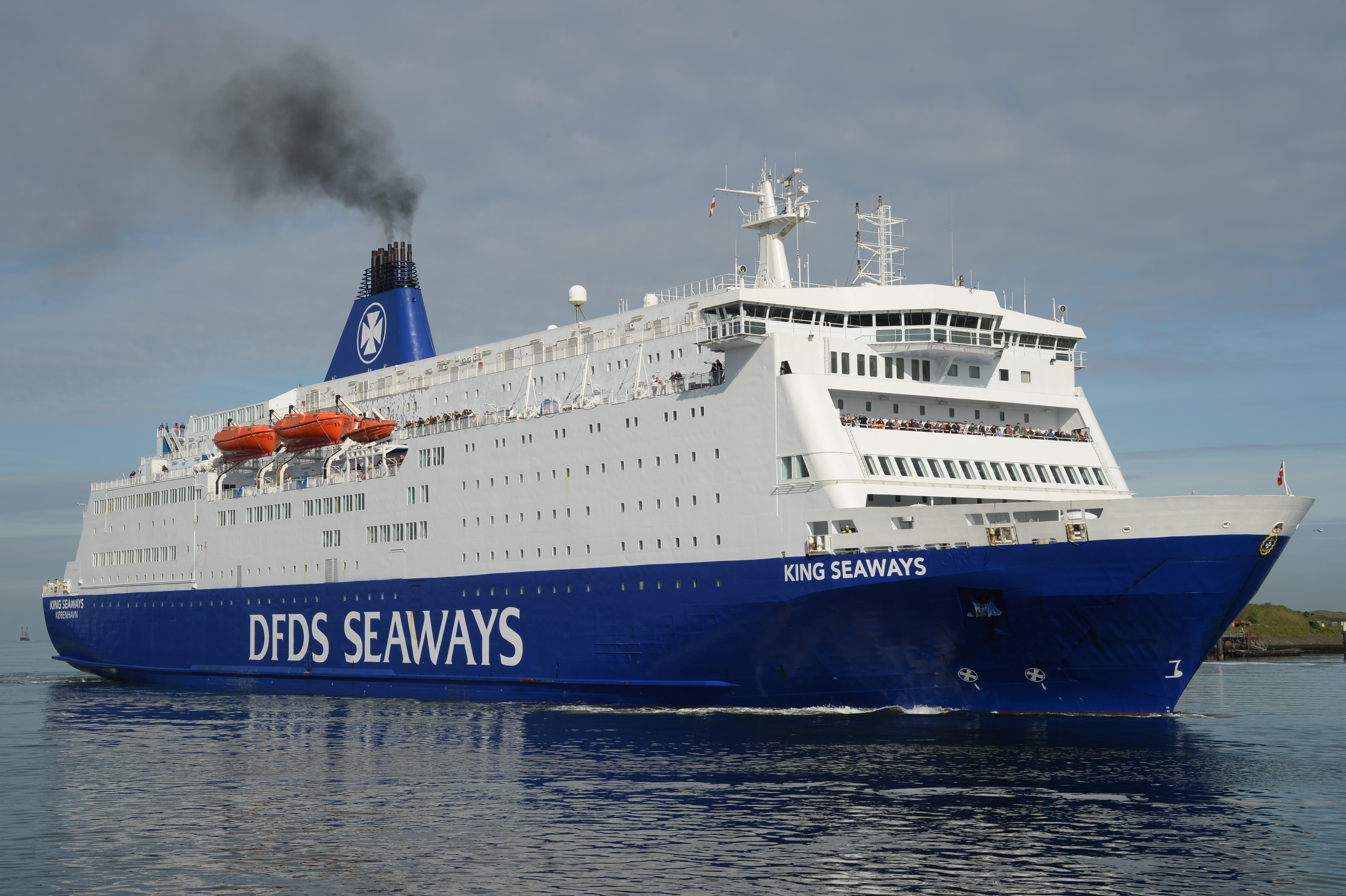
- King Seaways in Copenhagen

History
- Name: 1987–1993: Nils Holgersson; 1993–2006: Val de Loire; 2006–2011: King of Scandinavia; 2011–present: King Seaways
- Owner: 1987–1992: Wallenius Safe Felicia Ab; 1992–1993: SweFerry Ab; 1993–2006: Bretagne Angleterre Irlande SA; 2006-2020: DFDS
- Operator: 1987–1992: TT-Line; 1993–2006: Brittany Ferries; 2006–present: DFDS Seaways
- Port of registry: 1987–1993: Trelleborg, Sweden; 1993–2006: Morlaix, France; 2006–present: Copenhagen, Denmark
- Route: North Shields—IJmuiden (currently)
- Builder: Seebeckwerft, Bremerhaven, West Germany
- Yard number: 1059
- Launched: 16 August 1986
- Acquired: 20 February 1987
- Maiden voyage: 26 June 1987
- In service: 26 June 1987
- Identification: Call sign: OVOL2; IMO number: 8502406; MMSI number: 220449000
- Status: In service

General characteristics (as built)
- Class & type: Peter Pan-class cruiseferry
- Tonnage: 31,360 GT; 4,160 DWT
- Length: 161.45 meters
- Beam: 27.6 meters
- Draught: 6.20 meters
- Installed power: 4 × MaK 8M552; combined 19570 kW
- Speed: 21 knots (39 km/h; 24 mph)
- Capacity: 1,800 passengers; 1,320 passenger berths; 550 cars; 1,410 lanemeters

General characteristics (currently)
- Tonnage: 31,788 GT; 4,110 DWT
- Length: 161.0 m (528 ft 3 in)
- Beam: 27.6 m (90 ft 7 in)
- Draught: 6.5 m (21 ft 4 in)
- Decks: 9
- Capacity: 2,280 passengers; 1,686 passenger berths; 570 cars; 1,250 lanemeters

King Seaways is a cruiseferry operated and owned by the Danish shipping company DFDS Seaways on a route connecting North Shields, effectively the port of Newcastle upon Tyne, (being 6 miles to the east of the city), England to IJmuiden in the Netherlands. She was built in 1987 as Nils Holgersson by Seebeckwerft, Bremerhaven, West Germany for TT-Line. Between 1993 and 2006 the ship was named Val de Loire, owned by Brittany Ferries and used on traffic across the English Channel. A DFDS vessel since 2006, she was originally named King of Scandinavia, before being given her current name in 2011.

== History ==
=== Nils Holgersson 1987–1993 ===
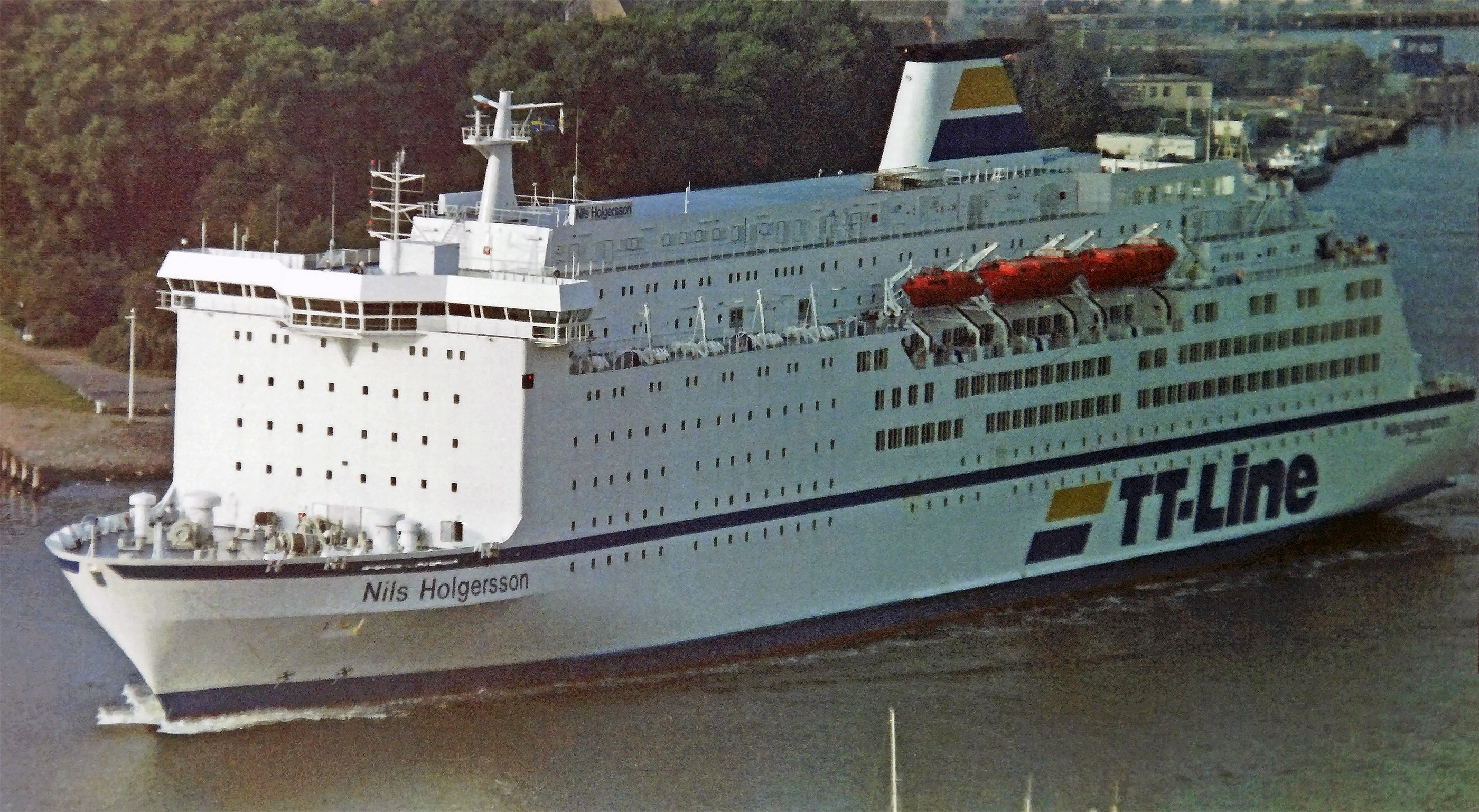
Nils Holgersson 1987 with box-shaped superstructure

The Nils Holgersson (fourth ship to bear the name in TT-Line's fleet) was built as the younger sister of the Peter Pan. The sisters were notably larger than any ships to have sailed for TT-Line before. Originally the Nils Holgersson was ordered by Ab Swecarrier (Swedish partners of TT-Line), but during construction she was sold to Wallenius Rederiet. When she was delivered in February 1987 the ship was bareboat-chartered back to Swecarrier, and began service between Trelleborg (Sweden) and Travemünde (West Germany) in June of the same year. In February 1992 the ship was sold to SweFerry, but kept in the same traffic.

=== MV Val de Loire 1993–2006 ===
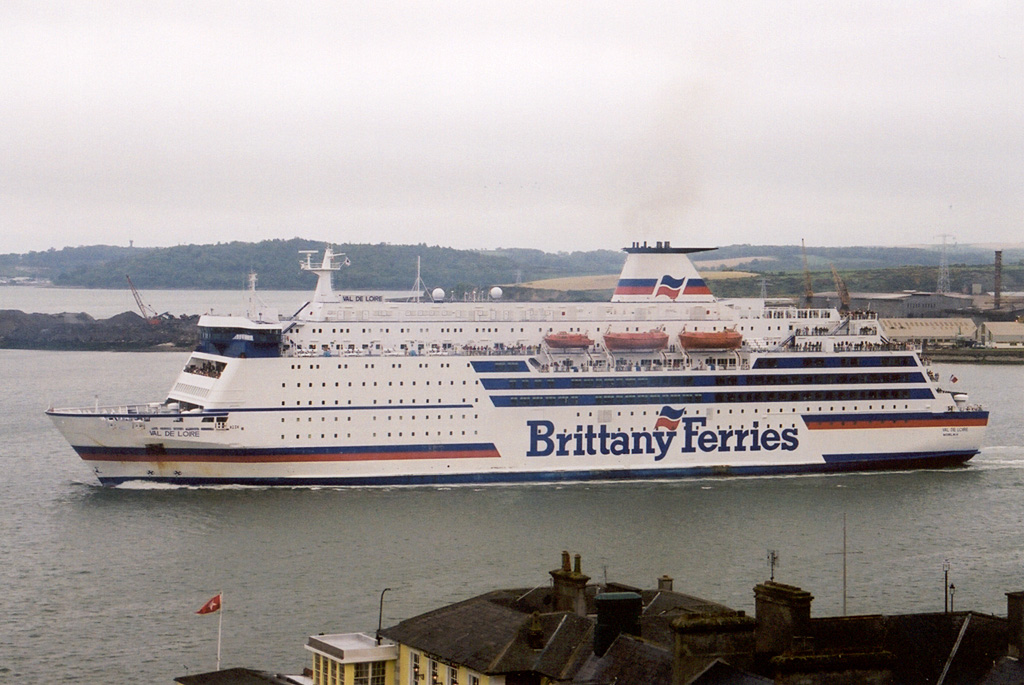
Val de Loire in Cobh in 2001

In January 1993 the Nils Holgersson was sold to Brittany Ferries and renamed MV Val de Loire. Before entering service for her new owners, the ship was rebuilt at INMA, La Spezia, Italy with a new streamlined forward superstructure, a new bow door and refurbished interiors. Inside the theme used was "Maritime Tradition", with many artifacts and ship models on display in her public areas. The facilities on board Val de Loire were very similar in style to those found on board the Normandie and the Barfleur. The Val de Loire was the first Brittany Ferries vessel to include a swimming pool, though when the ship was transferred to the Portsmouth–St Malo route it was rarely open.

After the rebuild was completed in June 1993, the ship entered service on Brittany Ferries' Plymouth–Santander route, as well as Plymouth–Roscoff and Cork–Roscoff. In 2004 the new MV Pont-Aven replaced the Val de Loire on her old routes, and she was transferred to serve on the Portsmouth–St Malo and Portsmouth–Cherbourg routes . In November 2005 the Val de Loire was sold to DFDS Seaways for delivery in 2006. Her final crossing with Brittany Ferries was between Portsmouth and Cherbourg on 20 February 2006.

=== King of Scandinavia 2006-2011 ===
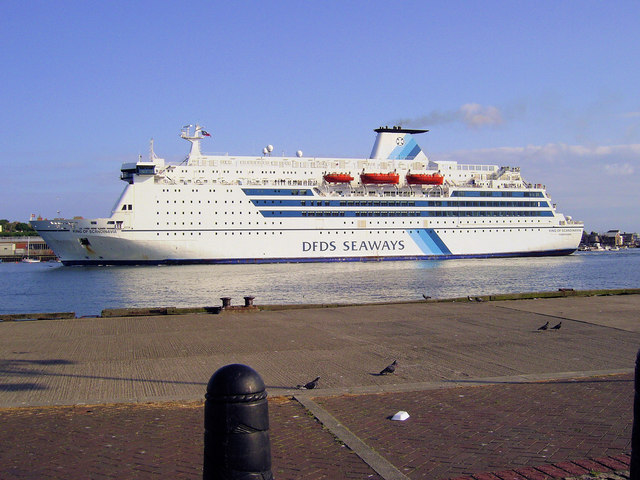
King of Scandinavia at the Fish Quay, North Shields in March 2006

In February 2006 the Val de Loire ended her service with Brittany Ferries and was renamed King of Scandinavia (she is the third ship of the same name to sail with DFDS Seaways). Between 2 and 11 March she was refitted for her new service in IJmuiden, the Netherlands, and on 11 March she began serving on DFDS Seaways' Newcastle - IJmuiden route, running parallel to Queen of Scandinavia. In May 2007 the Queen of Scandinavia swapped routes with Princess of Norway, a sister ship of the King of Scandinavia. Because of the equal capacity and layout of these sister ships, caravans are accepted at every sailing.

On 22 February 2008, the King of Scandinavia broke free from her moorings at North Shields during high winds, drifting across the River Tyne and colliding with an oil rig moored on the opposite bank. There were no passengers on board at the time of the incident. Sailings were suspended while repairs were carried out. .

=== King Seaways 2011-present ===
The King of Scandinavia ran with this name for nearly five years. In January 2011 she sailed from Newcastle to IJmuiden for the last time named as the King of Scandinavia, leaving IJmuiden on 16 January without any passengers and heading to Denmark for her annual docking period. She headed back to IJmuiden on 29 January with brand new paintwork and also running with the new name of King Seaways.

In January 2019 King Seaways was repainted both repainting DFDS Seaways to DFDS and simplifying the logo on the funnel.

Around this time the restaurants and facilities on board were also rebranded and refreshed.

In January 2022 the logo on the funnel was replaced with the brand name DFDS following a decision after testing new looks in 2019.

== Fire on board King Seaways ==
On 28 December 2013, a fire broke out on board King Seaways. The fire broke out in a cabin at around 10.45pm GMT but was extinguished within 15 minutes, according to a spokesman for DFDS. Royal Air Force helicopters from Leconfield near Hull, and Boulmer, Northumberland were scrambled to the vessel along with two Royal National Lifeboat Institution lifeboats from Bridlington and Filey. Four crew members and two passengers had to be winched off the ferry, which was heading to IJmuiden from North Shields, after they inhaled smoke when the fire broke out 30 miles off the Yorkshire coast. The six people were taken to Scarborough Hospital by RAF helicopter but were not at the time, thought to be in a serious condition. The 30,000-tonne ship returned to Newcastle Ferry Port, in North Shields, at around 4am and passengers were kept on board until 9am while police investigated. A 26-year-old Sunderland man was arrested on suspicion of arson after the fire alert. Northumbria Police said they had also arrested a 28-year-old man, also from Sunderland, on suspicion of affray.

== Sister ships ==
The Nils Holgersson was the second of four sisters in the Peter Pan class, the others being:

Peter Pan' (1986) was the first of the sisters built by Seebeckwerft, Bremerhaven, West Germany for TT-Line. She was sold in 1990 to Spirit of Tasmania and in 1993 renamed as the first Spirit of Tasmania. She was sold in 2002 to Nordsjøferger and charted in 2003 to Fjord Line as Fjord Norway. In 2006 she was sold to DFDS Seaways for use on the IJmuiden, Netherlands to Newcastle, England route as Princess of Norway. In 2011 she was renamed Princess Seaways.

Olau Hollandia was the third of the vessels and built by Schichau Seebeckwerft for TT-Line's sister company Olau Line to a modified design. With her Olau sister Olau Britannia (1990) she was charted in 1994 to P&O Ferries and renamed Pride of Le Havre. In 2005, she stopped operating for P&O and was subsequently sold to SNAV in Italy and renamed SNAV Sardegna.

Olau Britannia was the fourth of the vessels and also built by Schichau Seebeckwerft, Bremerhaven, Germany for TT-Line's sister company Olau Line. With her Olau sister the Olau Hollandia she was charted in 1994 to P&O Ferries and renamed Pride of Portsmouth. In 2005 she stopped operating for P&O and was subsequently sold to SNAV in Italy and renamed SNAV Lazio.

The former Koningin Beatrix (1986), sold in 1989 to Stena Line and renamed in 2002 as Stena Baltica, was built by the Dutch shipyard Van der Giessen de Noord for SMZ to a similar basic design as the four sisters, supplied by A.G. Weser.
