= Olau Line =

Shipping company

- Founded: 1956
- Founder: Ole Lauritzen
- Defunct: 1994
- Fate: Dissolved
- Headquarters: Sheerness, United Kingdom
- Area served: United Kingdom, Netherlands
- Services: Passenger transportation, Freight transportation
- Parent: 1979-1994: TT-Line

Olau Line was a shipping company that existed from 1956 to 1994. It operated a ferry service from the United Kingdom to the Netherlands from 1974 until 1994. Originally based in Denmark, the company passed under the ownership of the German TT-Line in 1979.

== History ==
=== Foundation ===
Olau Line was founded in 1956 by the Danish businessman and former student of Southampton School of Navigation; Ole Lauritzen. The name was originally chosen as a combination between Ole's christian and surname to avoid confusion with ships owned by the similarly named J. Lauritzen.

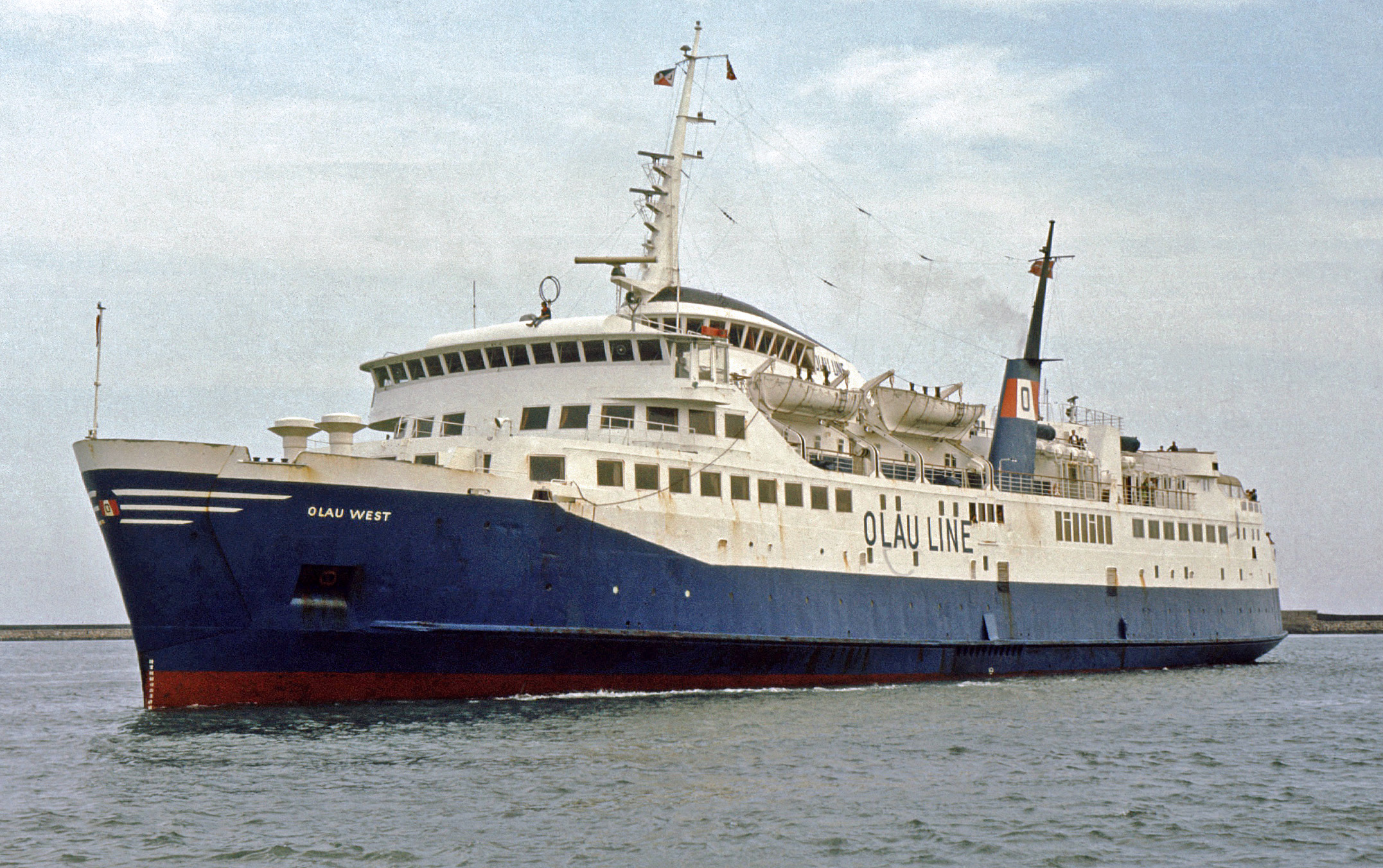
Olau West 1976 in Frederikshavn

Originally the company concentrated in chartering tankers and cargo ships to other shipping companies, after a short lived association with Thanet Line, in November 1974 Olau Line started a car/passenger ferry service. This was initially planned to run between Ramsgate and Dunkirk, but the lack of deep water port facilities in Ramsgate saw Lauritzen turn instead to a route from Sheerness in to Vlissingen (using Bastø V) and from Copenhagen (Denmark) to Aalborg (Denmark) (using Olau West). The latter line was closed after merely a month of service with Olau West joining Bastø V sailing to the Netherlands.

The service was initially managed by Bluett Shipping on behalf of the Danish Olau company, but this arrangement was brought under direct control in July 1975. Whilst a linkspan already existing at Sheerness, having been built for the Ostend-Sheerness Freight Ferries service prior to its demise in October 1972, initially, some of the facilities at Sheerness were temporary in nature, and with the Medway Ports Authority being unable to finance the construction of new facilities, these had to be funded by Olau Line themselves, with a permanent passenger terminal being opening in November 1975. The service quickly became profitable and the company looked to expansion with consideration being given to a new route initially to Boulogne, before sights were set on a service to Dunkirk, although it would take some time before this came to fruition.

Between 1974 and 1976 the consistence of Olau's fleet varied greatly, until in 1976 the company acquired M/S Apollo from Rederi AB Slite and renamed her MS Olau Kent and chartered M/S Finnpartner from Finnlines, renaming her MS Olau Finn. These two ships formed the Olau fleet for the next four years.

=== Takeover ===
In 1977 Olau attempted to start a service from Sheerness to Dunkirk, but this was not successful and soon closed. By the end of the 1970s the company was in heavy debt, and in 1978 Ole Lauritzen was forced to sell 50% of Olau Line to the West Germany-based TT-Line.

Disagreements over the restarting of the French routes between the German and Danish partners in the company continued. The result was that following year Lauritzen sold his remaining shares of the company to TT-Line, the proceeds from which he used to fund his new company; Dunkerque Ramsgate Ferries (DRF), which launched in May 1980 and collapsed in early September the same year. This collapse also affected the operations of Olau Line in that Olau Kent was owned by Lauritzen personally and then leased to Olau Line with the result being that DRF's collapse saw Olau Kent arrested in port due to outstanding debts. This led to the cessation of the ship on Olau Line services and its immediate departure from the fleet.

At the time of TT-Line taking control, their logo was adopted as the new logo for Olau Line, but with red and blue colours instead of TT-Line's yellow and blue. Instead of taking on existing ships (including a 1979 deal to take on the Canguro Cabo San Sebastian, as Olau Hollandia, and her sister Canguro San Jorge which collapsed at the last minute due to price and crewing arrangements) TT-Line decided to invest in new, large state-of-the-art cruiseferries for Olau services.

=== The 1980s ===
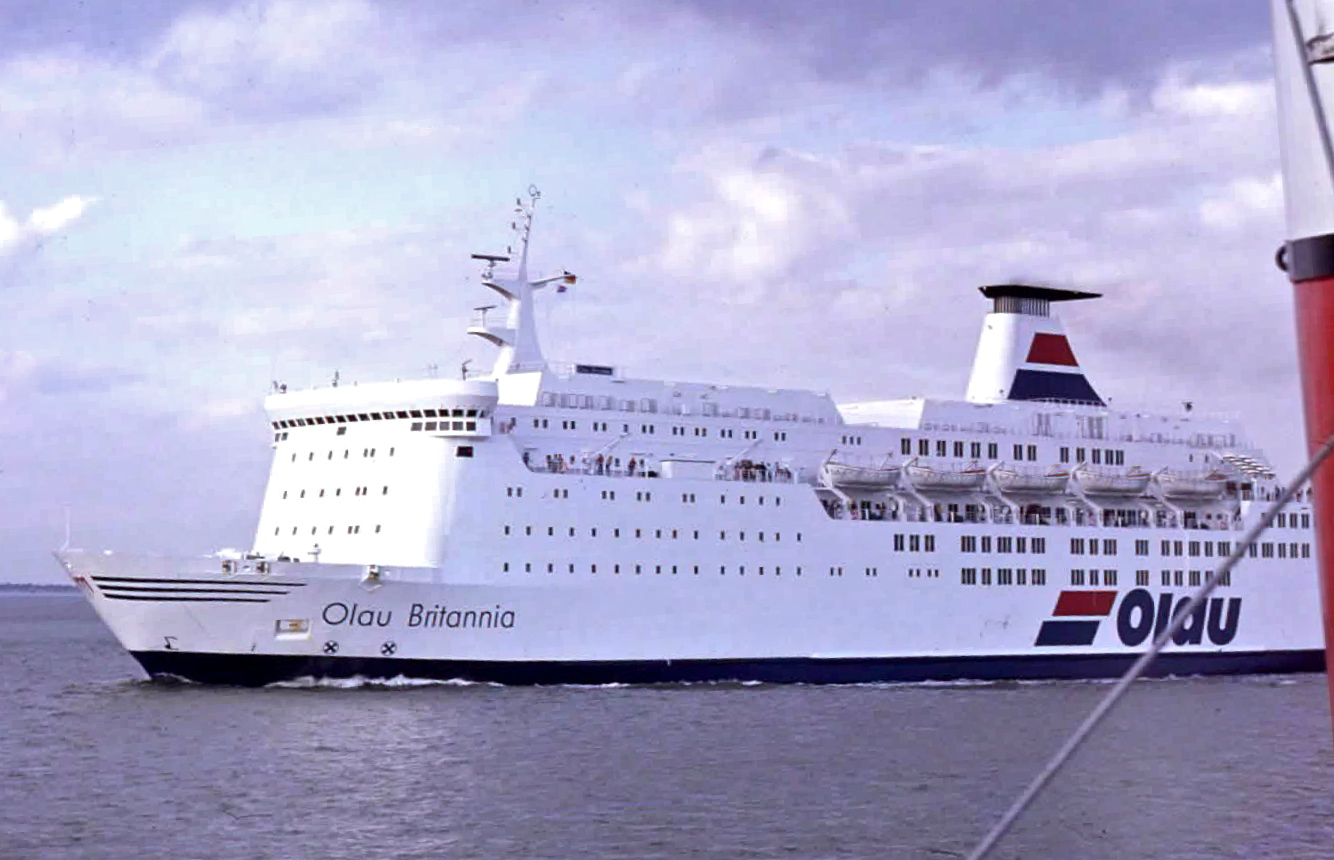
Olau Britannia in 1985

The new ships were delivered in 1981 and 1982 as MS Olau Hollandia and MS Olau Britannia, respectively. Unlike Olau's earlier ships, most of which were registered in the United Kingdom, the new ships were registered in TT's homeland Germany and were individually owned by partenreederei, a type of partnership under German and German-influenced maritime law for the joint ownership of a merchant vessel, corporately separate from Olau and TT-Line.

Olau Hollandia was the first newbuild ever to be built for Olau Line and, along with her sister Olau Britannia, were more than twice the size of the largest ferries operated by Olau before that point (they were also larger than any ships operated by TT-Line at the time). The Olau Hollandia was built to be "NATO-compatible", so that she could easily be converted to a troopship if required. She was also built with a thicker hull than normal, enough to be classified under Finnish ice class 1 A Super (the highest possible class) when she later began service on the Baltic Sea in 1989, without any structural changes to her hull.

With Olau's service being popular with Londoners, this saw it compete most closely with Sealink services between Harwich and Hoek van Holland. The introduction of the Olau Hollandia and Olau Britannia, and resulting raising of standards, is cited as one of the reasons, along with the need to prepare for the privatisation of Sealink, that the ex-Sessanlinjen jumbo ferry Prinsessan Birgitta was chartered for Sealink services as St Nicholas in 1983.

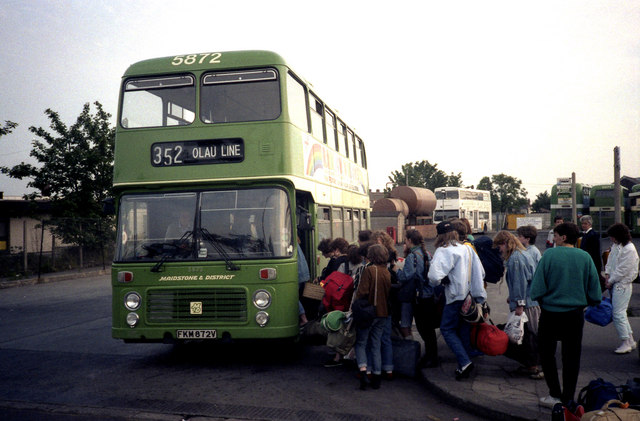
Olau Line Transfer Bus at Sheerness in 1987

By 1986, it had become apparent that Olau Line's, then 11 year old, terminal building at Sheerness was no longer fit for purpose. HM Customs and Excise deemed that the existing baggage hall was too small and required a new baggage reclaim hall to be built. This was the first phase of development with the new baggage building opening in March 1986 at a cost of £1.7 million. Administration staff were then moved from the terminal building to the refurbished former Pay Office building in September 1987 and a replacement Olau Line passenger terminal was constructed, ready for opening at Easter 1988.

In the late 1980s TT-Line decided to replace the Olau Hollandia and Olau Britannia with new ships. In 1986 and 1987 the parent company had taken delivery of two cruiseferries for their route between Germany and Sweden, these were the first two of the so-called Peter Pan class cruiseferries; MS Peter Pan and MS Nils Holgersson. TT-line decided to order two more ships of the Peter Pan-type, which would be built for Olau Line who had been undertaking a series of charters on freight vessels to provide extra capacity. These were delivered in 1989 and 1990, and like their predecessors were also named MS Olau Hollandia and MS Olau Britannia.

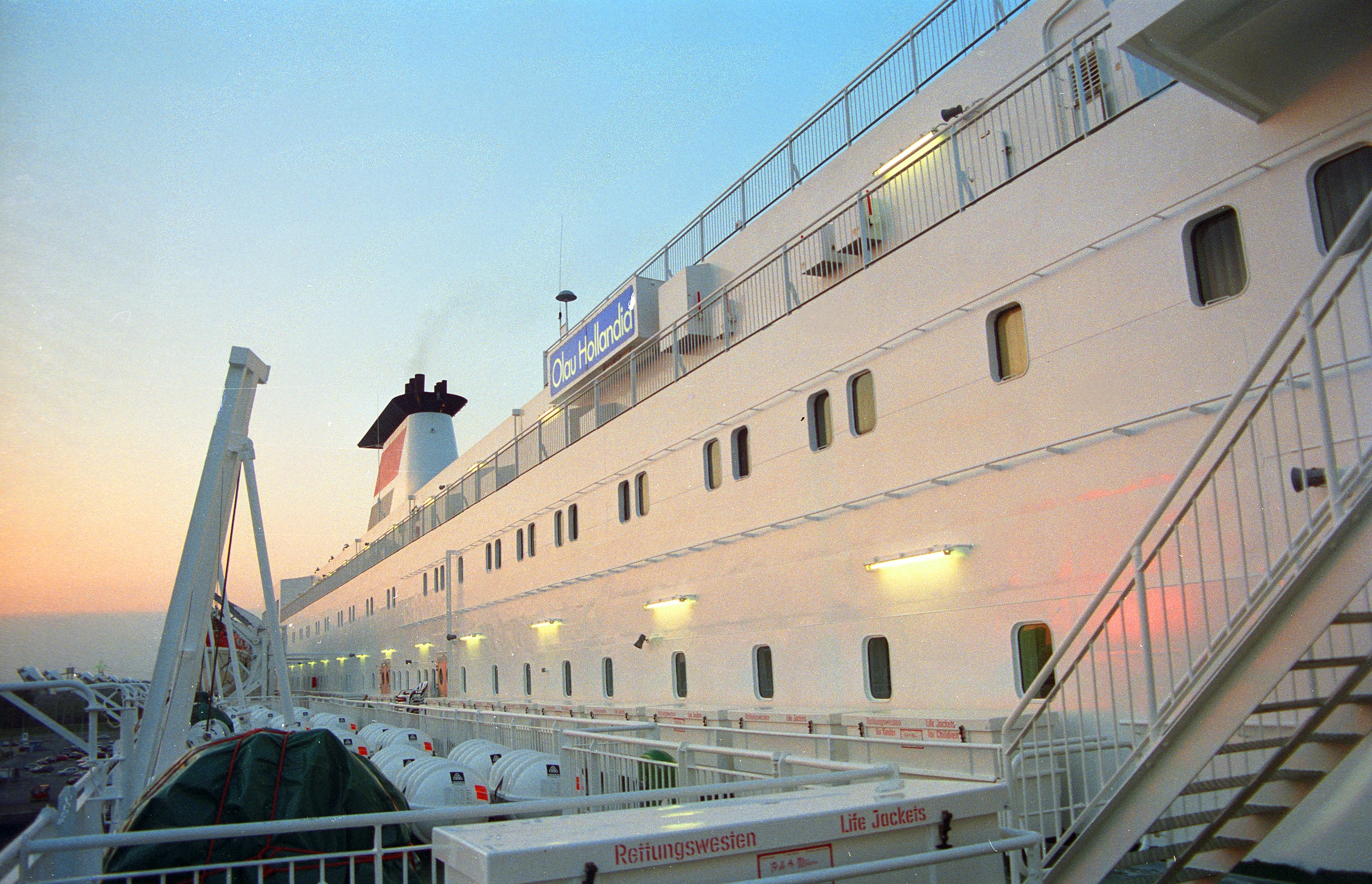
Olau Hollandia in 1989

Further to the earlier reconstruction of the baggage hall and passenger terminal, given the larger new ships by then planned for Olau Line, it had become clear that the original ferry berth at Garrison Point, which was only just large enough for the then Olau Hollandia and Olau Britannia, would not be large enough for the new ferries. Plans were duly drawn up by Medway Ports Authority and Olau Line for a £7 million, five acre reclamation scheme, to include a new Swedish-built linkspan. Vehicular access to the new linkspan was achieved by demolished a World War II blockhouse, however the passenger walkway was impeded by the listed Garrison Point Fort. The solution adopted was to run the passenger walkway through multiple gun emplacements within the fort to link to an elevated walkway connected to the ship, when berthed.

=== Final Years ===
The first Gulf War in 1991 and the resulting recession in the UK saw a cessation of growth in the freight carried by the company. This coupled with the introduction of the two new ferries by the company saw the long standing practice of chartering a separate freight ships come to an end after the last charter expired in September 1992.

The firm was voted best ferry line serving The Netherlands in 1991 and the following year was awarded a five star rating by The AA. Both ships retained this accolade in 1993 and 1994, although the 1994 presentation was on the day of the final sailing of Olau Britannia and three days before the end of Olau services altogether.

Given the structure and operations of the company, most expenditure was in Deutschmarks, but more income was in Sterling. This was to have a particular impact on profitability when the UK Government was forced to withdraw sterling from the European Exchange Rate Mechanism (ERM I) on Black Wednesday in September 1992. This saw the company needing to generate a reported additional £4 million income to maintain existing financial performance.

The new Olau Hollandia and Olau Britannia were more than twice the size of the old ships they had replaced, and they soon proved to be too costly for the route they were built for unless working practices could change. The ships had been registered on the second German Register of ships, which allowed some staff to be non-German. The German transport union, ÖTV, as a result, exercised their right to set up a Seebetriebsrat (works council). This severely restricted changes to staffing which could be made by the ships owners or operators, with resulting high costs for the German crewing. Due to the high operating costs the ships were taken out of the German Register of ships and registered in Luxembourg in January 1993, but action by the ÖTV forced the ships to be re-registered in Germany just a month later.

In January 1993, new European Community customs rules were brought in which saw the baggage reclaim building, built at the insistence of Customs and Excise in 1986, become redundant. The reduction in customs checks also led to large traffic jams leaving the Port at Sheerness.

An overall examination of the viability of the company was also undertaken in early 1993. Through this examination it became apparent that more competitive port costs could be achieved elsewhere, and this coupled with the long-promised but unstarted port entrance improvements and dualling of the A249 road, caused Olau Line to examine relocating their services away from Sheerness to new facilities at Dartford, under the proposed name Olau London Ferries. A planning application was submitted to Dartford Borough Council in December 1993 for a new ferry terminal, offices and associated facilities, at Clipper Boulevard, Dartford.

Meanwhile, TT-Line had been experiencing competition on their routes from Euroway and their long expected collapse saw TT experience increased passengers numbers on their ships at the same time as Olau were experiencing insufficient profits from their own ships. TT therefore drew up plans for swapping the Olau ships with their smaller ships on the Trelleborg—Travemünde service (converted ex-freighters; Nils Holgersson and Peter Pan) as all four ships had common shareholders within their respective partenreedereis. The, by then, ex-Olau ships would move into Bahamian registry, but when the ÖTV protested again, TT-Line decided instead to announce on 23 March 1994 their plans to close down Olau Line completely in May.

During the preceding eighteen months, it became known that P&O European Ferries were keen to add Olau Hollandia and Olau Britannia to their fleet to compete with Brittany Ferries on the Portsmouth-Le Havre route, although their attention later switched to the Athena and Kalypso, belonging to the collapsed Viking Line partner: Rederi AB Slite. Ultimately Athena and Kalypso were sold to StarCruises, but the decision to close Olau Line brought with it the announcement of a five year charter of Olau Hollandia and Olau Britannia to P&O at a daily rate of £25,000 each, with an option for a further five years.

Olau Britannia undertook her final sailing for Olau Line on 12 May 1994, and Olau Hollandia undertook her final sailing for Olau and the final Olau sailing ever on 15 May 1994, after which they entered P&O service as Pride of Portsmouth and Pride of Le Havre respectively in June 1994.

The settlement agreement between Olau's owners and shipowners, and the ÖTV, prohibited the owners from participating in Olau Line operations from that point forwards. This did, due to the structure of the company, with Olau operating as an agent for the parent company, allow Olau Line themselves to provide a service using alternative ships and new financial backers, however as P&O's keenness to take on Olau Hollandia and Olau Britannia demonstrated, such tonnage was unavailable, despite Olau's management searching hard for suitable ships. Despite granting of consent for the new ferry terminal at Dartford, Olau Line ceased operations in May 1994.

== Fleet ==
Name	Built	In service	Tonnage	History
Olau Vig	1973 (Hatlo Verksted, Ulsteinvik, Norway)	1974	499 GT	Sank in 2013 off Puerto el Guamache, Venezuela
Bastø V	1973 (Moss-Rosenberg Verft, Jeløya, Norway)	1974–1975	1,877 GT	Currently in service (as of 2025) as Bharat Seema with Government of Andaman and Nicobar Islands
Olau West	1964 (Schiffbau-Gesellschaft Unterweser, Bremerhaven, Germany)	1974–1976	3,242 GT	Scrapped at Aliağa Ship Breaking Yard in 2013
Olau East	1965 (Schiffbau-Gesellschaft Unterweser, Bremerhaven, Germany)	1975	3,242 GT	Declared a total loss after a fire off Punta de Piedras in March 1983. Scrapped in 1985.
Olau Dana	1969 (Cantieri Navale del Tirreno e Riuniti, Riva Trigoso, Italy	1975–1976	7,672 GT	Later flagged in China, reported cut up
Olau Kent	1970 (Jos L. Meyer Verft, Papenburg, Germany)	1976–1980	4,371 GT	Scrapped at Aliağa Ship Breaking Yard in 2021
Olau Finn	1966 (Lindholmens Varv, Gothenburg, Sweden	1976–1981	7,978 GT	Scrapped at Aliağa Ship Breaking Yard in 2003
Espresso Olbia	1966 (Lübecker Flenderwerke, Lübeck, Germany	1980–1981	7,338 GT	Scrapped at İskenderun in 2015
Olau Hollandia (1980)	1980 (Seebeckwerft, Bremerhaven, Germany)	1980-1988	14,981 GT	Currently in service (as of 2025) as Almariya with Trasmediterránea
Olau Britannia (1982)	1982 (Seebeckwerft, Bremerhaven, Germany)	1982–1990	15,604 GT	Sold in 2025 for use "as a floating hotel in a large port in the Far East"
Wesertal	1972 (Rickmers Werft, Bremerhaven, Germany)	1983; 1986–1988	1,597 GT	Scrapped at Fornæs Shipbreaking, Grenå in 2011
Wuppertal	1977 (Rickmers Werft, Bremerhaven, Germany)	1986	1,599 GT	Caught fire whilst sailing to Pichilingue, Mexico in 2022
Belinda; Nordborg	1979 (Lödöse Varv, Lödöse, Sweden)	1988; 1990	5,551 GT	Scrapped at Aliağa Ship Breaking Yard in 2012
Argo	1976 (Kröger-Werft, Rendsburg, Germany)	1989	9,097 GT	Currently in service (as of 2025) as Dada Star in Lebanon
Olau Hollandia (1989)	1989 (Schichau Seebeckwerft, Bremerhaven, Germany)	1989–1994	33,336 GT	Currently in service (as of 2025) as GNV Cristal with Grandi Navi Veloci
Olau Britannia (1990)	1990 (Schichau Seebeckwerft, Bremerhaven, Germany)	1990–1994	33,336 GT	Currently in service (as of 2025) as GNV Atlas with Grandi Navi Veloci

== Routes ==
- (United Kingdom) Sheerness - (Netherlands) Vlissingen 1974 to 1994
- (Denmark) Copenhagen - (Denmark) Aalborg 1974 to 1975
- (United Kingdom) Sheerness - (France) Dunkirk 1977

== Former Olau routes today ==
In July 1994, the owners of the port at Sheerness; Mersey Docks and Harbour Company commenced a new single ship, freight only ferry service called Ferrylink Freight Service, with a further ship added in September 1994.

This service was rebranded as Eurolink Ferries in April 1995, with the introduction of passenger services initially with a single ship, with a second added a couple of months later. In August 1996, MDHC announced passenger services would cease, but freight would continue whilst a buyer for the loss-making routes was sought, due to increased competition from other ferry companies and the then recently opened Eurotunnel service through the Channel Tunnel. Losses had reached £4.5 million in the first six months of 1996, on top of losses of £1.9 million in the preceding six month period. No buyer was found and full closure by the end of 1996 was announced in November of that year with losses reaching £9.1 million.

Eurolink Ferries ceased operations on 1 December 1996 with customers being offered space on the Dartford-Vlissingen service of Jacobs Holdings subsidiary; Dart Line under a pooling agreement. Jacobs was owned by former Sally Line executive; Michael Kingshott.
