= Fastnet Line =

Ferry service between Wales and Ireland

- Founded: 2010
- Defunct: 2 February 2012
- Headquarters: Ringaskiddy, Ireland
- Area served: Irish Sea
- Key people: Phillip Jones, CEO; Conor Buckley, Chairman
- Services: Passenger transportation Freight transportation

Fastnet Line operated a ferry service carrying cars, freight and passengers between Ringaskiddy, Cork, Ireland and Swansea, Wales on MS Julia. The service ran from March 2010 until November 2011.

== History ==
From 1987 to 2006, the Swansea–Cork ferry was operated by Swansea Cork Ferries Limited, an Irish-based company. The service ceased operating after the 2006 season. After disposing of their most recent vessel (the MV Superferry) and failing to find a suitable replacement, Swansea Cork Ferries Limited announced that they would not be operating the service during the 2007 summer season. In fact, there was no service during the whole of 2008 or 2009.

A two-year campaign, started in April 2008 by concerned local businesses and individuals in the south-west of Ireland and South Wales, resulted in the forming of a co-operative which raised funds to enable the purchase of a new vessel and set up Fastnet Line.

Swansea to Cork branding

After a long process of negotiation, including approval by the Finnish courts, it was announced in mid-September 2009 that the ship to run the new service, MS Julia, had been purchased for Fastnet Line. She was built in 1982 and had previously served routes in Scandinavia. MS Julia left Finland for Cork on 17 September 2009, calling at the Port of Swansea for berthing trials along the way. She wintered in the Port of Cork before leaving in January 2010, for dry-docking, safety certification, and for some minor modifications in compliance with safety regulations at both Cork and Swansea.

Fastnet Line services started from Swansea on 10 March 2010, and from Cork on 11 March 2010, with three services a week in each direction from September to June, and four between July and August. On 24 March 2011 a dissertation on the impact of the period of closure on tourism was published.

=== End of service ===
The company suddenly cancelled sailings on 1 November 2011, and entered into examinership, an Irish process supplying protection against bankruptcy akin to the US Chapter 11 procedure. In January 2012, the business plan was to become a seasonal ferry service from April 2012. The company was seeking sponsorship, with the vessel to be named by the sponsor and used as "Britain's largest billboard". Details of the situation were posted and updated on the company website.

The following month the company said it would cease operations, with the loss of 78 jobs, as it had failed to fund a €1.6 million rescue package. It hoped the service would be resurrected. On 2 February 2012 (incorrectly headed 2 February 2011) the company said on its website: "Swansea ferry service loses fight for survival".
