= Schichau Seebeckwerft =

Schichau Seebeckwerft GmbH
- Type: GmbH
- Industry: Shipbuilding
- Founded: 1950
- Defunct: 2009
- Headquarters: Bremerhaven, Germany
- Key people: Karl-Heinz Jahncke, CEO
- Products: Ferries; RoRo ships RoPax ships Container ships
- Number of employees: ~380
- Website: www.schichau-seebeck-shipyard.com

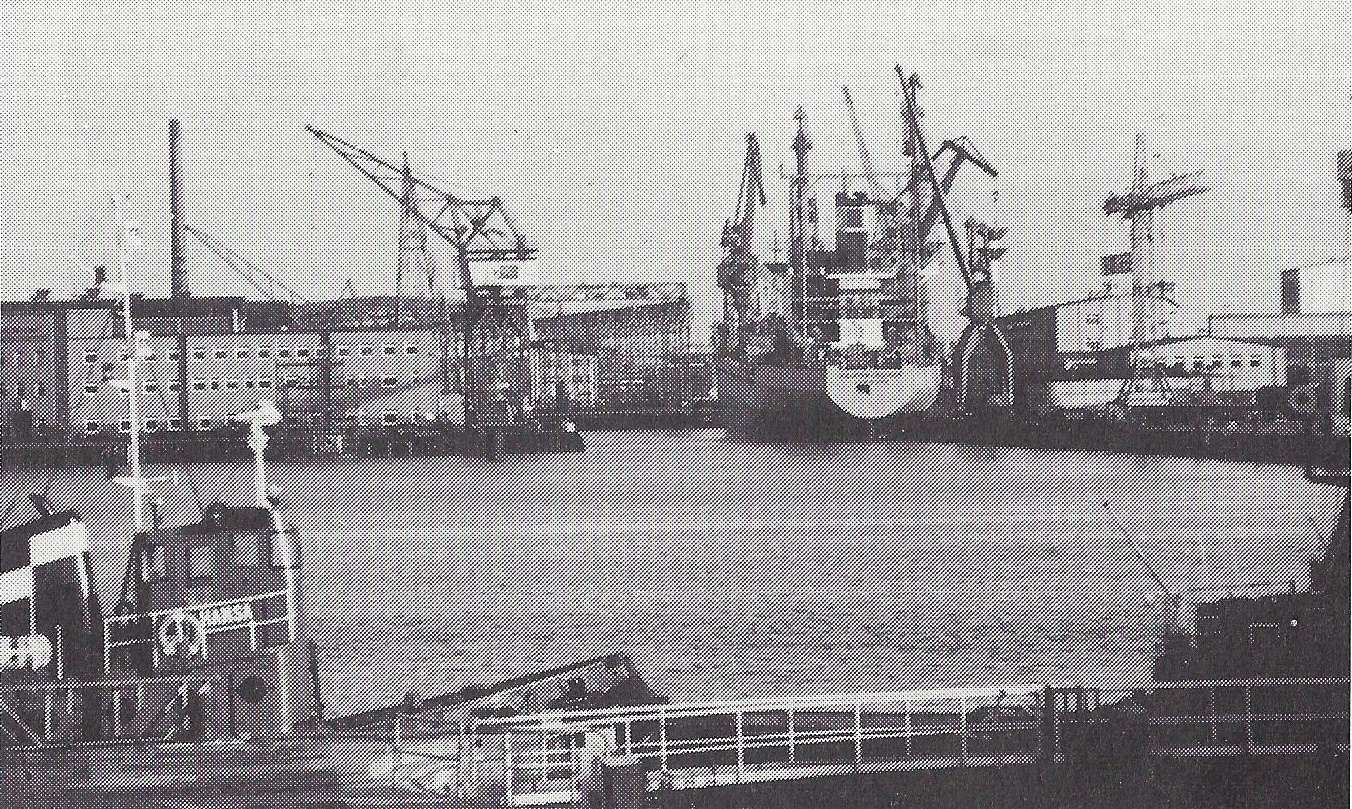
Seebeck Shipyard

Schichau Seebeckwerft (often abbreviated SSW) was a German shipbuilding company, headquartered in Bremerhaven. The name comes from the 1988 merger of Schichau with Seebeckwerft.

== History ==
The original company Schichau was founded in 1837 by Ferdinand Schichau in Elbing (Elbląg) as F. Schichau. It started by manufacturing steam engines and heavy equipment, later locomotives. In 1854 Schichau built a shipyard in Elbing. A new large shipyard in Danzig was opened in 1890 (later becoming a part of the Polish Gdańsk Shipyard after 1945). In 1929 the shipyard was bought by the German government. Another shipyard was completed in 1906 near Bremerhaven. In 1930 the company also bought a small yard in Königsberg.

After 1945 shipyards in Danzig, Königsberg and Elbing were found on the Soviet and Polish territories, and the company restarted business in Bremerhaven in West Germany, merging with the Schiffbaugesellschaft Unterweser in 1972 to become Schichau Unterweser and with Seebeckwerft in 1988 to become Schichau Seebeckwerft. The company was then bought by Bremer Vulkan and initially closed in 1996. The new SSW Schichau Seebeck Shipyard GmbH, founded in 1998, was closed in 2009.

With its long history of major shipbuilding, the company is also known as Schichau-Werft, or Schichau Seebeck Shipyard (Werft meaning shipyard).

== Ships built by Schichau Seebeckwerft (selection) ==
=== Civilian ships ===
- BEWA Discoverer, (1974)
- Pride of Free Enterprise, (1980)
- Spirit of Free Enterprise, (1979)
- Herald of Free Enterprise, (1979, Capsized off Zeebrugge, Belgium on 6th March 1987 and Scrapped in Kaoshiung, Taiwan)
- Olau Hollandia, (1989)
- Olau Britannia, (1990)
- European Pathway, (1991)
- European Seaway, (1991)
- European Highway, (1992)
- Pride of Burgundy, (1993)
- Superfast I, (1995)
- Superfast II, (1995)

The following vessels are often cited as being built by Schichau Seebeckwerft, but were actually designed and built by AG Weser Seebeckwerft prior to the merger with Schichau Unterweser

- Olau Hollandia, (1981)
- Olau Britannia, (1982)
- Peter Pan, (1986)
- Nils Holgersson, (1987)
