= MS Stena Baltica =

Eight ships have been named Stena Baltica:

- Stena Baltica (1966) scrapped 2006
- Stena Baltica (1966) scrapped 2003
- Stena Baltica (1971) scrapped 2004
- Stena Baltica (1973) now Sveti Stefan II with Montenegro Lines
- Stena Baltica (1973) now Rigel I with Ventouris Ferries
- Stena Baltica (1986) now SNAV Adriatico with SNAV
- Stena Baltica (2007), named in 2013, built as Cotentin for Brittany Ferries, and returned to its original name in 2020
- Stena Baltica (2005), named in 2021, built as Mersey Viking for Norse Merchant Ferries
