= Moby Zazà =

Ship built in 1982

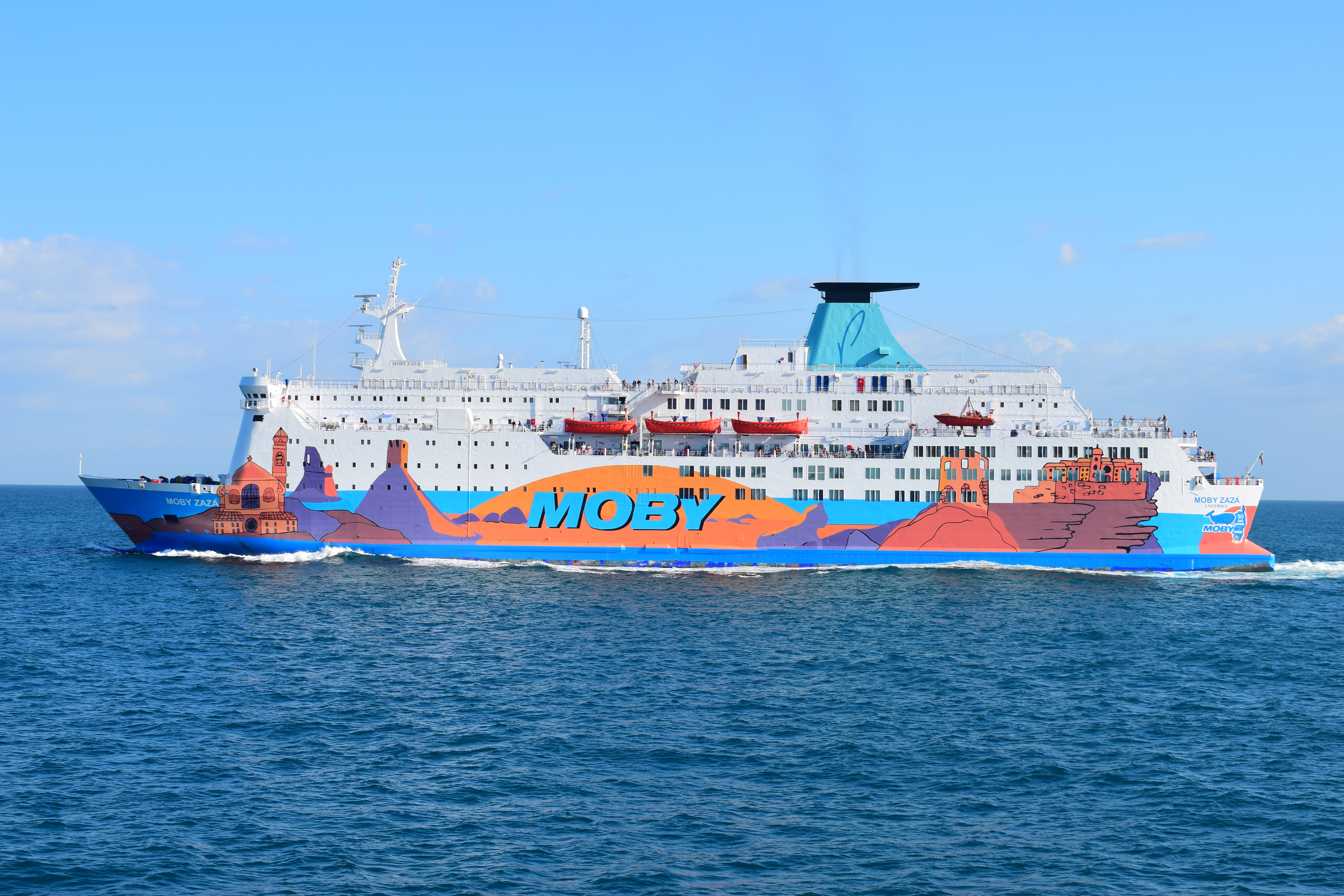
- Moby Zaza leaving Livorno in 2024.

History
- Name: 1982–1990: Olau Britannia; 1990–1991: Bayard; 1991–2008: Christian IV; 2008–2012: Julia; 2012–2015: Wind Perfection; 2015– : Moby Zazà
- Operator: 1982–1990: Olau Line; 1990-1990: Fred. Olsen & Co; 1990–2008: Color Line; 2008-2008: Stella Line; 2010–2012: Fastnet Line; 2012–2015: C-bed; 2015 onwards: Moby Lines
- Port of registry: 1982–1990: Hamburg, West Germany; 1990-1990: Oslo, Norway; 1990–2008: Kristiansand, Norway; 2008–2009: Helsinki, Finland; 2009–2012: Hamilton, Bermuda; 2012–2015: London, United Kingdom; 2015 onwards: Livorno, Italy
- Builder: Weser Seebeckswerft, Bremerhaven, West Germany
- Yard number: 1031
- Laid down: 3 June 1981
- Launched: 5 December 1981
- Christened: 7 May 1982 by Princess Margaret, Countess of Snowdon
- Acquired: 2 May 1982
- In service: 8 May 1982
- Identification: IMO number: 8020642
- Status: In service

General characteristics
- Type: Cruiseferry
- Tonnage: 15,064 GRT as built; 21,699 GT after 2005 rebuild; 2,880 t DWT
- Length: 153.40 m (503 ft 3 in)
- Beam: 24.24 m (79 ft 6 in)
- Draught: 5.80 m (19 ft 0 in)
- Installed power: 4 × Pielstick 8PC2-5L 400 diesels; 15,300 kW
- Propulsion: 2 x controllable pitch propellers
- Speed: 20 kn (37.04 km/h; 23.02 mph)
- Capacity: 2,048 passengers; 938 berths (as built); 863 berths (after 2005 rebuild); 530 cars

Moby Zazà is a ferry operated by Moby Lines between Nice and Bastia. Until 2015 she was named Wind Perfection, an accommodation ship owned and operated by C-bed. She was built in 1982 as Olau Britannia by Weser Seebeckswerft in Bremerhaven for Olau Line, who used her on Sheerness—Vlissingen service. In 1990 she was sold to Fred. Olsen & Co and renamed Bayard for services between Norway and Denmark. In 1991 Fred. Olsen Lines was sold to Color Line and the Bayard passed under their ownership under the name Christian IV. In 2008, she was sold to Stella Lines and renamed MS Julia for service between Helsinki and St Petersburg. This was a failure and after just two months the Julia was laid up. In 2009, she was sold to Fastnet Line and entered service on their Swansea—Cork route in 2010, retaining her earlier name.

== History ==
The Olau Britannia was delivered as the younger sister of Olau Hollandia on 5 May 1982. Two days later she was christened by Princess Margaret in Sheerness and placed on the route Sheerness—Vlissingen. In August 1984 the ship collided with the freighter MS Mont Louis in the English Channel. Olau Line ordered larger replacements for the Olau Hollandia and Olau Britannia in the late 1980s (which were also named Olau Hollandia and Olau Britannia). In preparation for delivery of its replacement, the first Olau Britannia was sold to Nordström & Thulin, Sweden on October 4, 1989, to be delivered in 1990. However, already on 11 October Nordström & Thulin resold the ship to Fred. Olsen & Co.

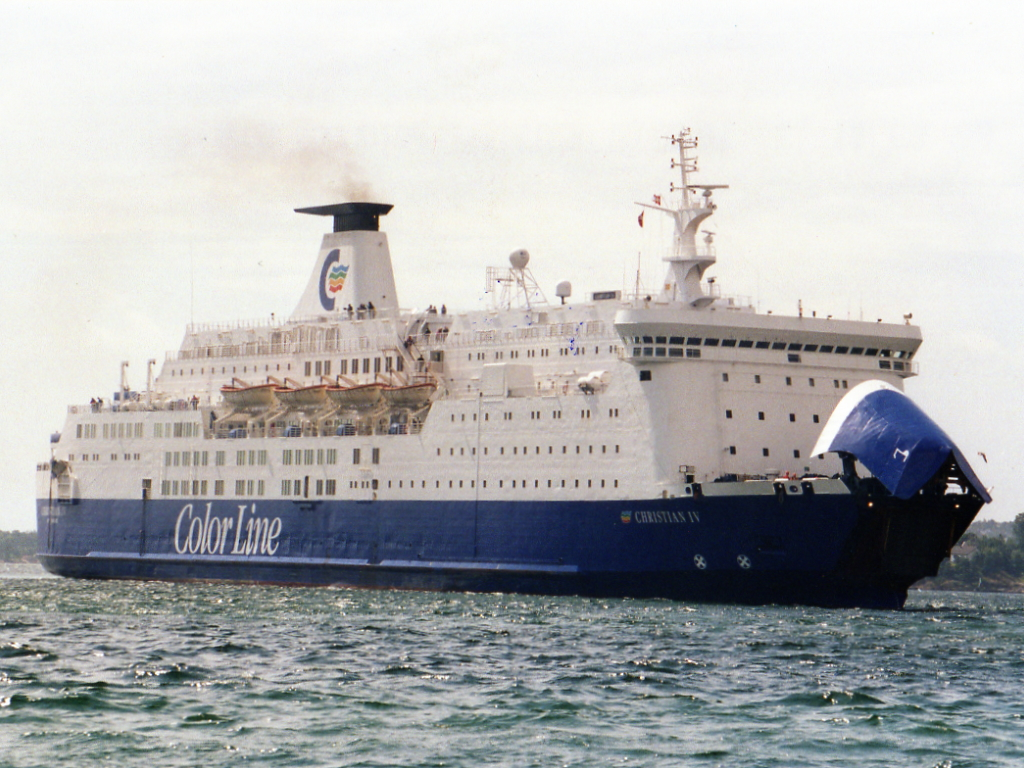
Christian IV in Kristiansand.

In May 1990 the ship was delivered to her new owners and renamed Bayard. After a refit at Blohm & Voss, Hamburg, Germany, the Bayard was set in on Kristiansand—Hirtshals route in June 1990. For the winter season she was transferred to Oslo—Hirtshals service. Fred. Olsen sold its Scandinavian ferry operations to Color Line in December 1990, and in January 1991 the Bayard was renamed MS Christian IV. The ship was kept on the Oslo — Hirtshals service until April 1994, when she returned to the Kristiansand — Hirtshals route. In March 1995 the ship temporarily sailed on the Moss—Kiel route, after which she reverted to her older route. The ship was refitted in 1999 at Fredericia Værft in Denmark, with additional restaurants and better conference facilities. She was refitted again in 2005, this time at Remontowa, Gdańsk, Poland. In March 2008 she was replaced by the new SuperSpeed 1 on the Kristiansand—Hirsthals route, and laid up at Sandefjord. Between 2008-04-10 and 2008-06-15 the Christian IV sailed on the Larvik—Hirsthals route, replacing MS Peter Wessel – that had been sold to the Mediterranean Shipping Company – until the delivery of the new MS Superspeed 2.

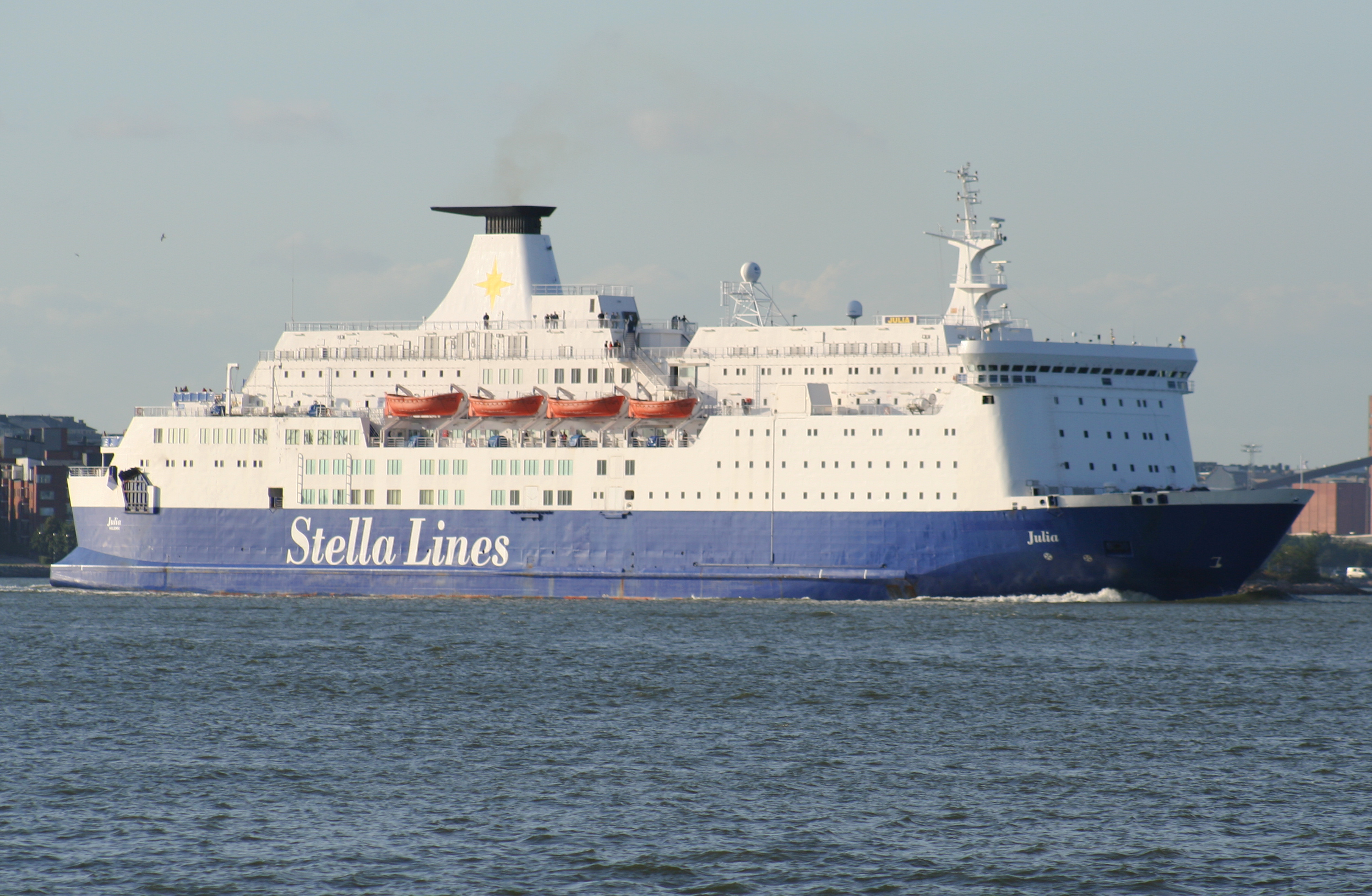
Julia in Helsinki in August 2008

In May 2008 Christian IV was sold by Color Line to Stella Naves Russia (Stella Lines), a subsidiary of the Finnish freight shipping and stevedoring operator Stella Company Group, for €13 million. The ship was delivered to her new owners in July 2008, and subsequently renamed Julia. On 2008-08-01 she entered service on Stella Lines' Helsinki—St. Petersburg route. Passenger numbers on the Julia were low due to the bureaucracy related to applying a visa in order to travel between Finland and Russia. Additionally due to restrictions imposed by the Port of Helsinki the Julia could not carry any freight on the service. On 2008-09-20 the Russian State Duma approved a law change allowing passengers arriving by scheduled ferry services to visit Russia for up to 72 hours without a visa.

Despite this legislation change the Helsinki—St. Petersburg service of the Julia was terminated due slower than expected growth of the passenger numbers, failure to acquire additional funding due to the 2008 financial crisis and larger than expected harbour expenses in St. Petersburg. On 9 October 2008 Stella Lines CEO Kari Juvas stated that the company would make the decisions about the future of the Julia within the next few days. According to Juvas the alternatives are selling the ship or utilizing the ship on a service between Kotka, Finland and Sillamäe, Estonia. Juvas had stated that Stella was interested in operating a ship on the Kotka—Sillamäe route already in July 2007. The Russia-based companies Morskoi Voksal and Inflot, along with the City of St. Petersburg planned on acquiring the share majority of Stella Lines and providing funding for recommencing service on the Helsinki—St. Petersburg route with the Julia. However, on 3 November 2008 it was reported that the City of St. Petersburg had withdrawn from the purchase. On the same date Kim Sjöblom of Stella Lines stated the company are looking for other funders allowing the service to be restarted. These attempts failed and Stella Lines was declared bankrupt on 6 November 2008, with the ownership of the Julia passing to Stella's creditors Aktia Savings Bank.

Reportedly several companies have expressed an interest in buying the Julia, but none have been able to raise the capital needed to buy her. On 17 February 2009 it was reported that one of the potential buyers for the Julia is Irish shipowner Frank Allen, who had acquired a loan from a Finnish bank to purchase the ship for use on a service between Cork and Swansea under the brand of B&I Line, which would be re-established for this service. A public auction to sell the Julia was held on 26 February 2009, but no bids were made. In a second auction held on 12 March 2009 B&I Line made the highest bid of €6 million, but confusion surrounded the initial undertaking of €1.5 million to secure the ship and she remained unsold. No further auction was held, instead the bankrupt's estate negotiated directly with potential buyers. In addition to B&I Line, Greek Halkidon Shipping Corporation and two unnamed Finnish companies were reported to have shown interest in the ship.

From 2012 the ship was an accommodation ship owned and operated by C-bed and used at West of Duddon Sands Wind Farm and nearby Walney Wind Farm. She was sold in December 2015.

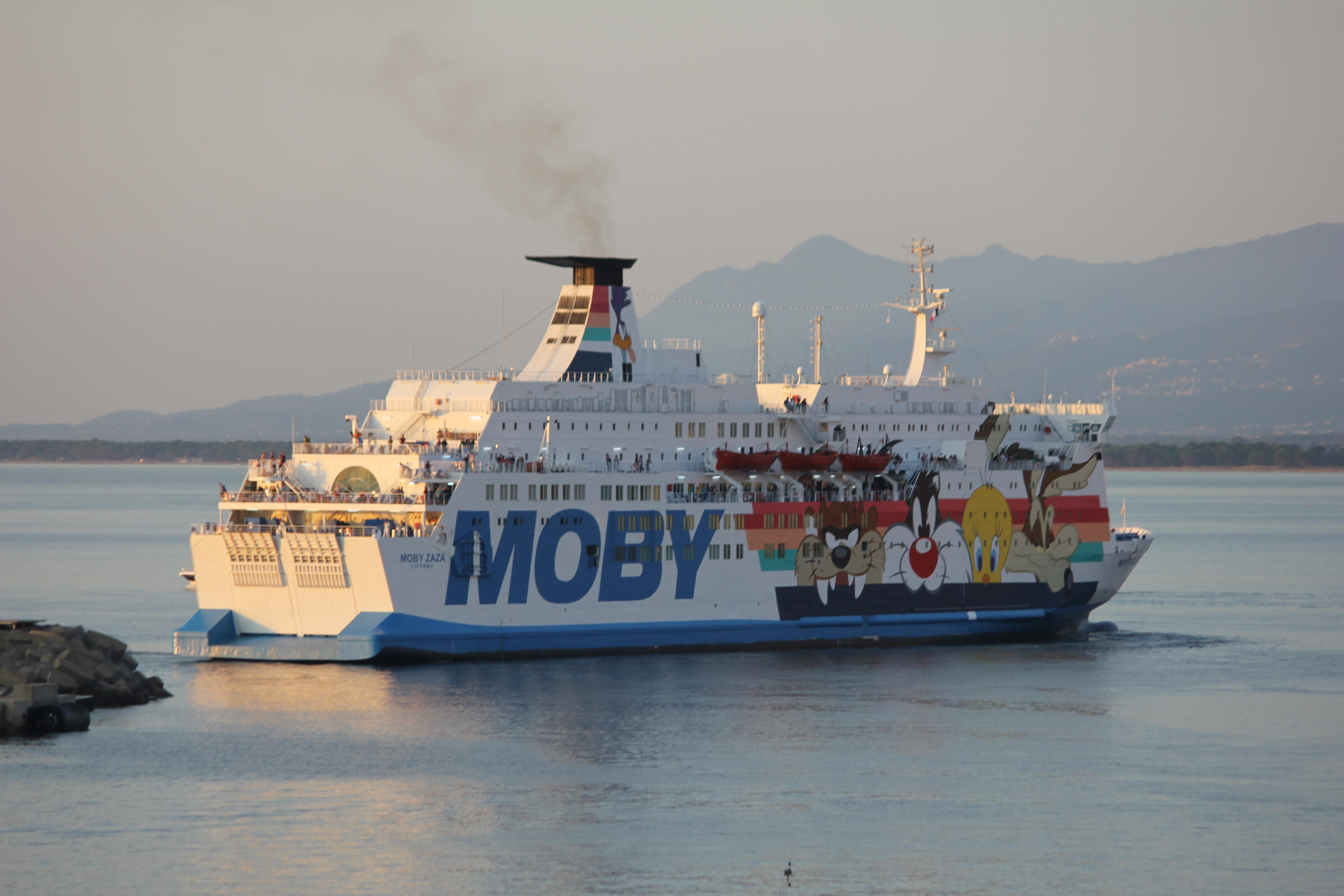
MS Moby Zazà in 2017

Following bankruptcy of former operator, SNCM, Moby Line bought the ferry to operate its new France to Corsica service, together with MV Moby Corse. She started in June 2016, but suffered an electrical fire, whilst at Nice, in August 2016.

From November 2024 to February 2025, the ship covered the route between Golfo Aranci (Sardinia) and Porto-Vecchio (Corsica) as a temporary substitution of the Bonifacio - Santa Teresa Gallura line due to the technical unavailability of ferry Giraglia. In 2025 it was reflagged in San Marino and sold as a floating hotel in Asia.
