= SNAV =

Italian ferry operator

- Headquarters: Naples, Italy
- Area served: Italy, Sicily, Croatia, Sardinia
- Services: Passenger transportation, Freight transportation
- Parent: Mediterranean Shipping Company
- Website: www.snav.it

SNAV (Società Navigazione Alta Velocità) is an Italian company that operates ferry services from Italy to Sardinia, Croatia and Sicily.

== Routes ==
SNAV operates a large network of routes across the Mediterranean and Adriatic.

- Naples - Palermo / Pontine Islands / Aeolian Islands / Capri Islands
- Split - Ancona / Stari Grad / Pescara

== Current fleet ==
SNAV operates a mixed fleet of high speed ferries and hydrofoils.

=== Ferries ===
- HSC SNAV Alcione
- HSC SNAV Altair
- HSC SNAV Antares
- HSC SNAV Aquila
- HSC SNAV Aries
- HSC SNAV Orion
- HSC Don Francesco

=== Hydrofoils ===
- HF Superjumbo

== Photo gallery ==
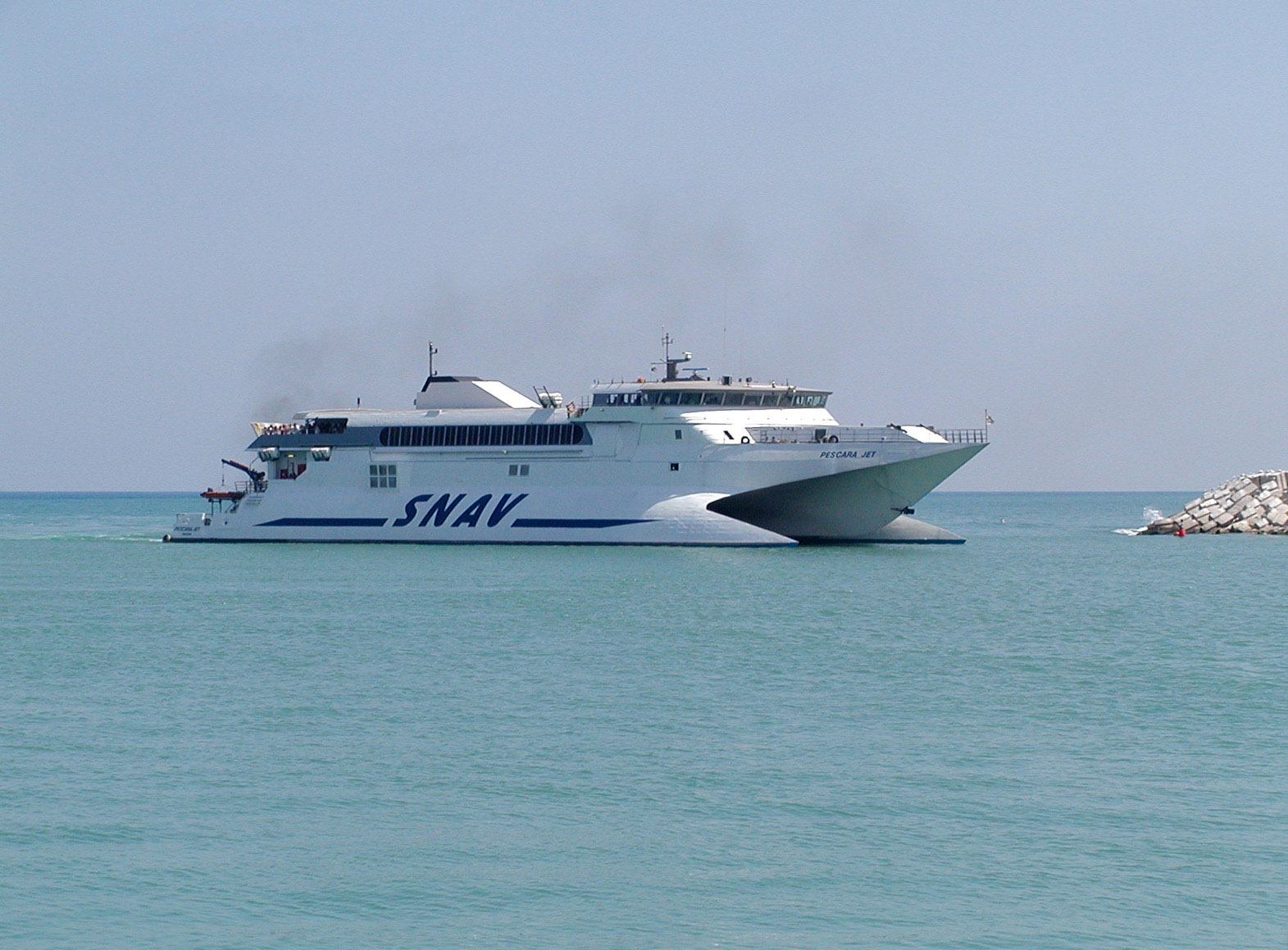
Pescara Jet

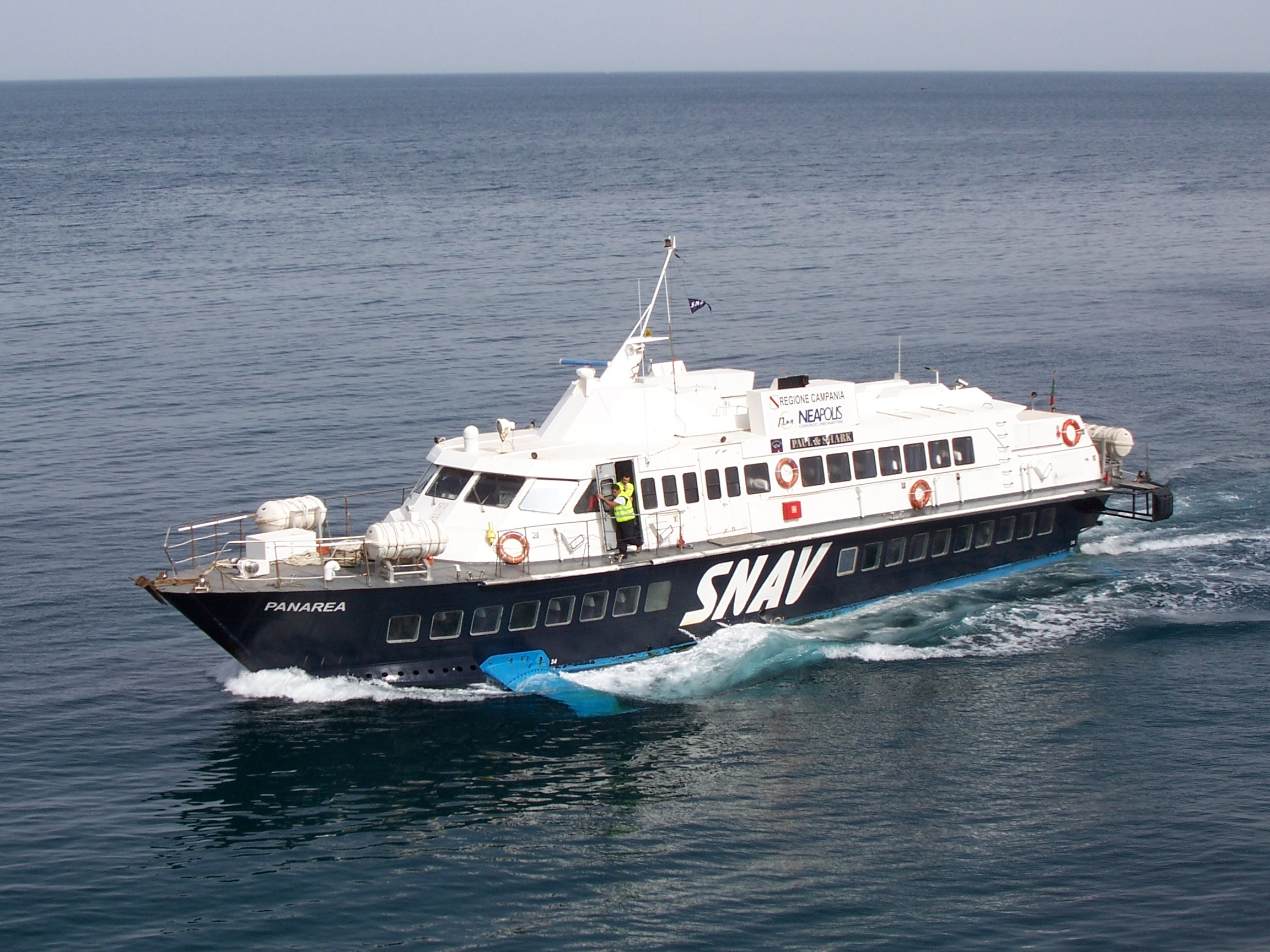
Panarea

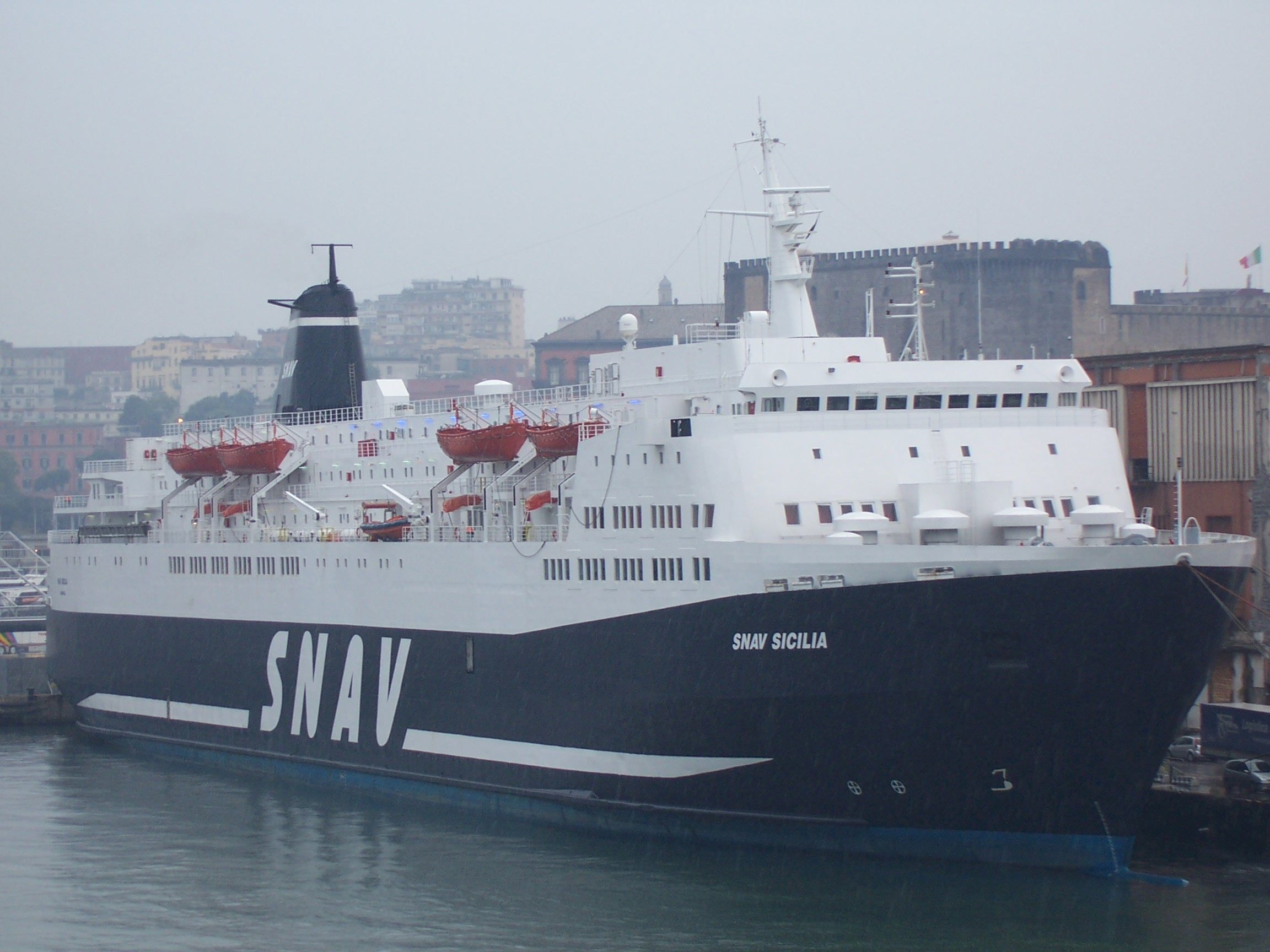
SNAV Sicilia

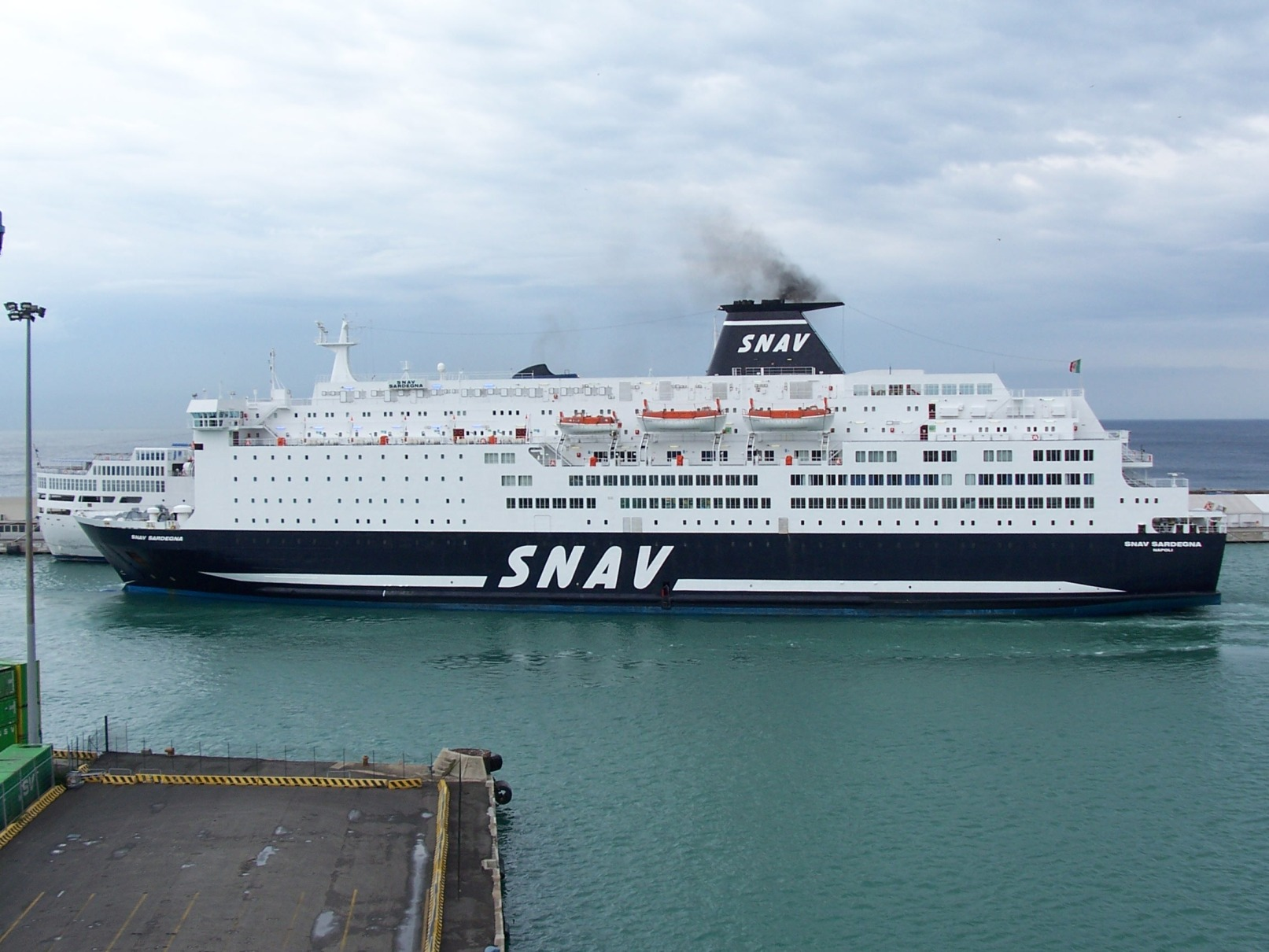
SNAV Sardegna
