= MV Pont-Aven =

Ship built in 2004

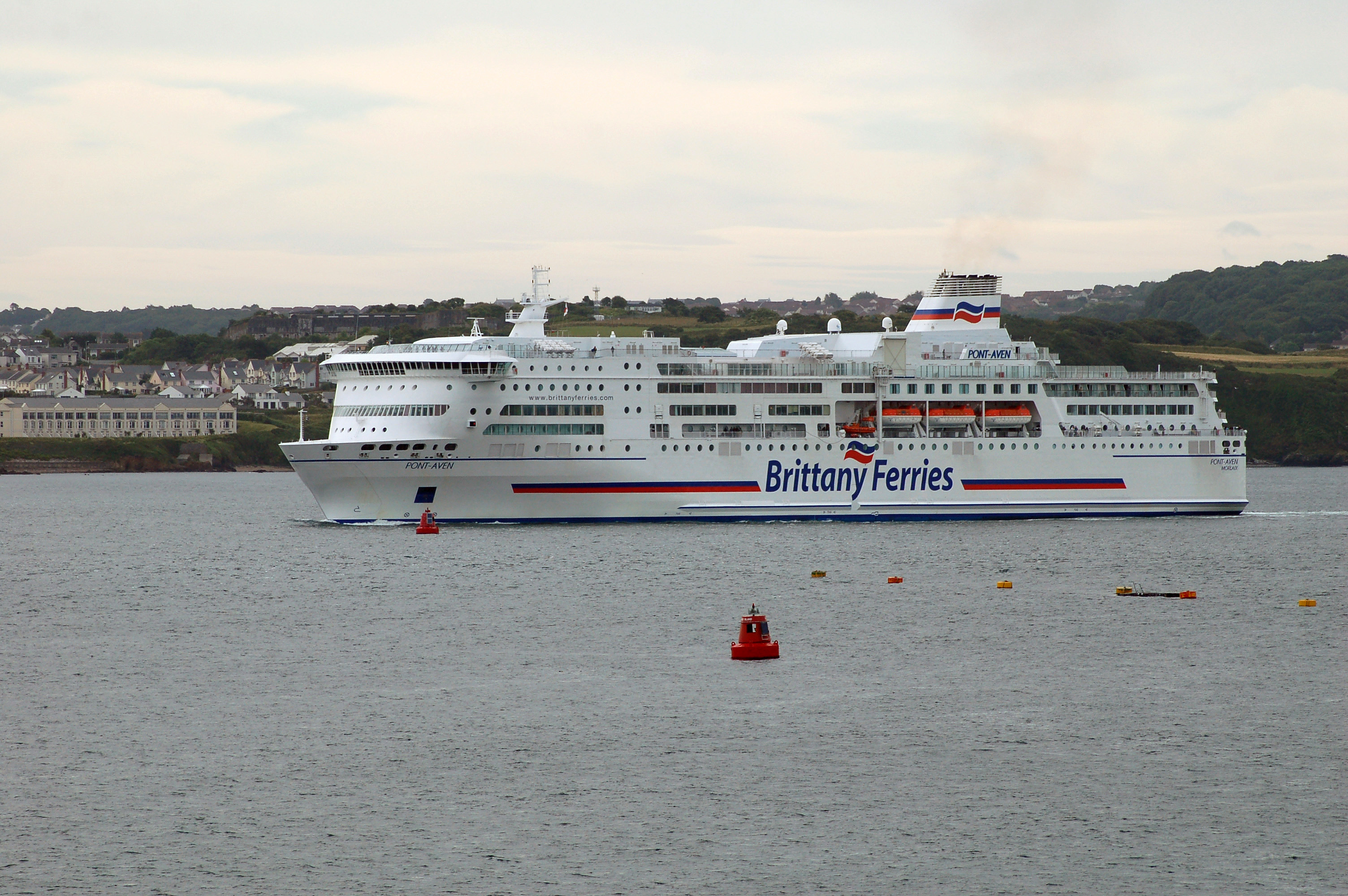
- Pont-Aven approaching Millbay Docks (Plymouth)

History
- Name: Pont-Aven
- Owner: 2004-2020: SOMABRET; 2020-present: Brittany Ferries
- Operator: Brittany Ferries
- Port of registry: Morlaix, France
- Route: Plymouth - Santander; Portsmouth - Santander; Plymouth - Roscoff; Roscoff - Cork; Portsmouth - Saint-Malo (winters only)
- Ordered: 2002
- Builder: Meyer Werft, Papenburg, Germany
- Cost: £100m
- Laid down: 9 April 2003
- Launched: 13 September 2003
- Completed: 2004
- Maiden voyage: 23 March 2004
- In service: 23 March 2004
- Identification: IMO number: 9268708; Call sign: FNPN; MMSI number: 228183600
- Status: In Service

General characteristics
- Tonnage: 40,859 GT
- Length: 186.3 m (611.2 ft)
- Beam: 30.9 m (101.4 ft)
- Draught: 6.8 m (22.3 ft)
- Depth: 9.7 m (31.8 ft)
- Decks: 10
- Ice class: 1B
- Installed power: Four MaK 12M43 diesels, 14,675bhp each
- Speed: Cruising: 22 knots (41 km/h; 25 mph); Maximum: 28 kn (52 km/h; 32 mph)
- Capacity: 2,415 passengers; 600 vehicles
- Crew: 185

Pont-Aven is a cruiseferry operated by Brittany Ferries. She was built at Meyer Werft shipyard in Germany and has been sailing for Brittany Ferries since March 2004. She is the current and longest serving Brittany Ferries flagship; sailing between the UK, France, Spain and Ireland. Pont Aven is the fastest and largest purpose-built cruise-ferry on the English Channel.

Prior to being named, Pont-Aven was referred to as Bretagne 2; this was then the codename for the new Brittany Ferries vessel for the Plymouth–Roscoff route, the Armorique. Pont-Aven's layout is similar in many respects to that of another Brittany Ferries vessel, Bretagne.

== Service history ==
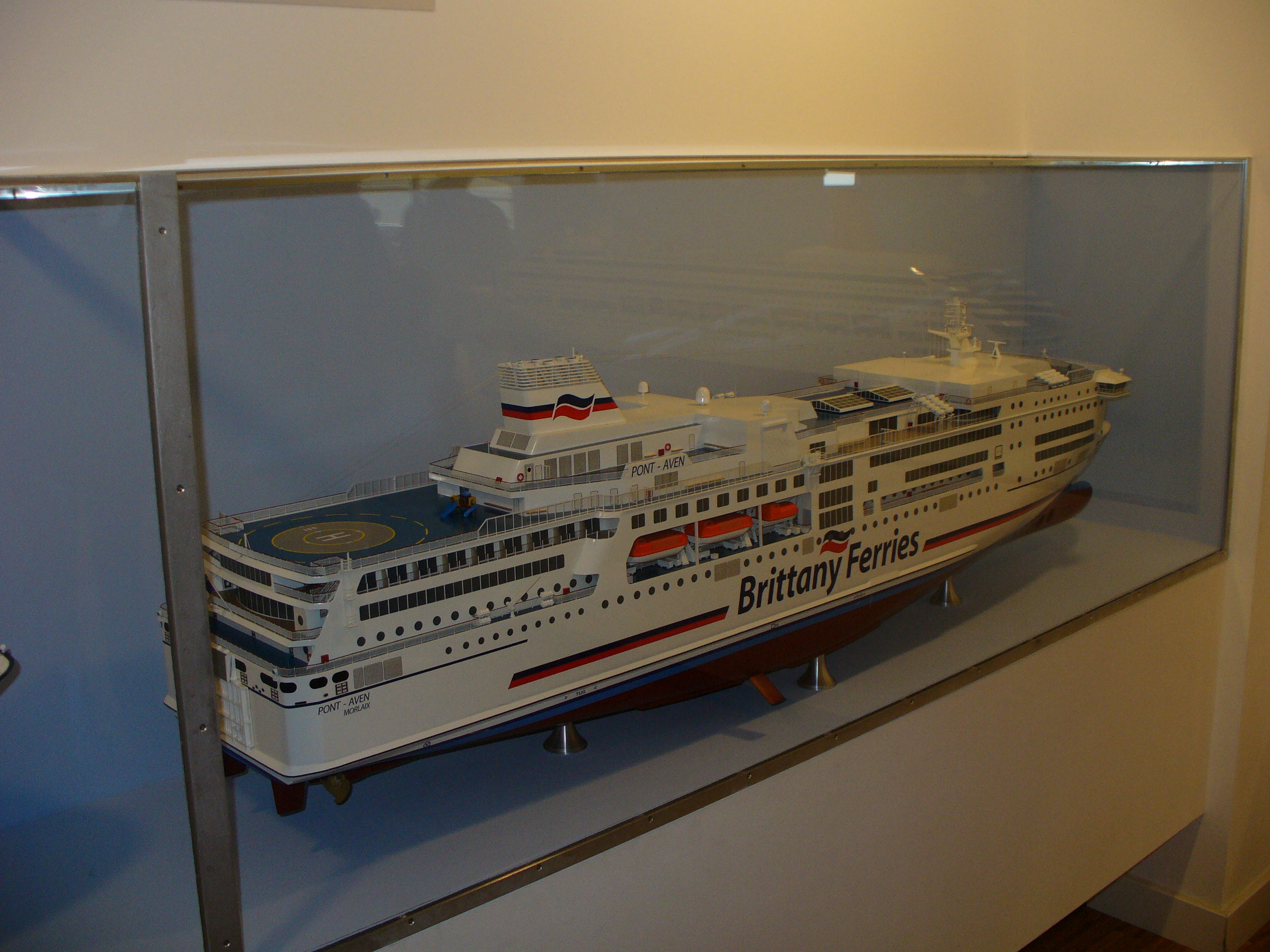
A model of the Pont-Aven as built.

Pont-Aven was ordered by Brittany Ferries from the Meyer Werft shipyard on the river Ems, gt Papenburg, Germany on 22 February 2002. She was laid down on 9 April 2003, launched 13 September the same year and completed on 7 February 2004, ahead of schedule. She completed sea trials and was handed over on 27 February, making her maiden voyage on 24 March, from Roscoff to Santander.

Pont-Aven experienced a number of technical problems in her 1st year of service. Most serious was the flooding of an auxiliary engine room in August 2004 caused by a faulty sea valve leaving the ferry unable to move from the Plymouth terminal for two days. Many services were disrupted at the height of the holiday season, many passengers having to be transferred to services from Poole and Portsmouth. The problem occurred at the same time as a major breakdown on the Irish Ferries vessel Normandy, which operates on the Rosslare - Cherbourg route. This situation left no passenger ferry link between Ireland and France and as a result many holidaymakers were forced to use the so-called Land Bridge route, travelling from Ireland to Wales by ferry and driving to Plymouth or Portsmouth to board a ferry for France, or vice versa. Other problems included the bow door jamming shut and the unusual roll when travelling at high speed even in calm weather. However most faults have now been corrected and the vessel has become a popular member of the Brittany Ferries fleet.

On 22 May 2006 Pont-Aven sustained damage en route to Santander from Plymouth. Several forward windows were smashed by a 9-metre rogue wave which resulted in a number of cabins flooding. She was forced to divert to Roscoff where passengers disembarked. On 26 May 2006 Pont-Aven returned to service, while refurbishment was carried out on board throughout the voyage. The windows were covered by metal. These windows were later replaced with smaller, round porthole windows in late 2007 - early 2008.

On 18 August 2008 the ship experienced problems opening the bow door in Santander for cars to be off-loaded. As a result of this the ship had to re-dock, aft into the port first, and the vehicles had to reverse off. This led to further delays and the problem was not fixed before the next crossing to Plymouth later that day; meaning that vehicles had to reverse or make a U-turn to disembark.

At around 04:00 on 29 April 2019, a fire in the engine room caused the ship to divert to Brest whilst on route from Plymouth to Santander.

== Name ==
Pont-Aven was named for the town of Pont-Aven in Brittany. The town is famous as the home of a group of artists known as the Pont-Aven School, and the interior decor of the ship commemorates this link.

== Routes ==
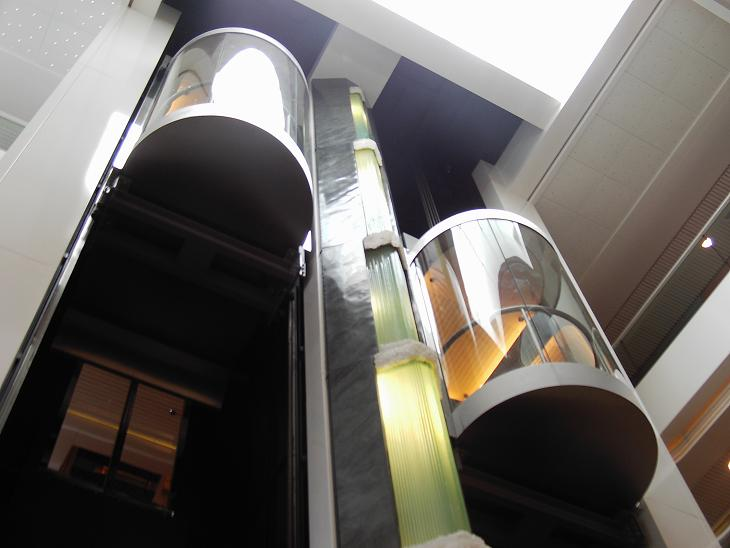
The glass lifts in the atrium are one of the Pont-Aven's cruise ship-like features.

=== Current routes ===
- Plymouth – Santander 2004–present
- Plymouth – Roscoff 2004–present
- Cork – Roscoff 2004–present
- Portsmouth – St Malo 2006–present (winter only)

=== Previous routes ===
- Portsmouth - Santander 2009–2020

== Other routes served ==
In addition to her regular routes, Pont-Aven has seen occasional use between Plymouth and St Malo, Plymouth and Cherbourg and Portsmouth and Cherbourg. In most cases these were position moves during the winter though passengers and freight were carried.

== See also ==
- Largest ferries of Europe
