= Truckline Ferries =

Freight ferry operator between the United Kingdom and France

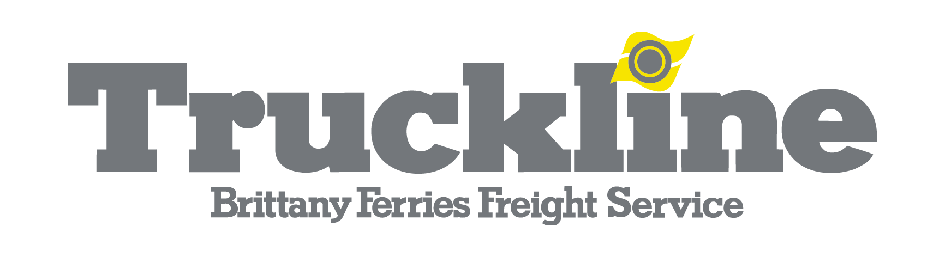
- Founded: 1973
- Defunct: 1999
- Fate: Absorbed into Brittany Ferries
- Headquarters: Cherbourg, France
- Area served: English Channel
- Services: Passenger transportation Freight transportation
- Parent: To 1985: CGM / Worms; 1985-1999: Brittany Ferries

Truckline Ferries was a French shipping company that operated passenger and freight services between the United Kingdom and France.

== History ==
=== Background ===
In the late 1960s, Poole Harbour Commissioners were considering the option of establishing a terminal for a freight ferry service between Poole and Cherbourg to take advantage of the shortest distance between England and France, west of Dover (64 nautical miles). Reclamation work for the land the terminal was to be built on was commenced in 1971 with completion due two years later.

=== Early years ===
The following year discussions came to fruition about the formation of an Anglo-French-Australian company to be known as Truckline Ferries, with initial investors being the English; Hambros Bank, Worms & Cie of France and Australian shipping firm; Thomas Nationwide Transport (TNT), along with input from Poole Harbour Commissioners’ vice-chairman, director of TNT and local businessman; Peter Allesbrook.

Truckline Ferries services launched on 29 June 1973 with a crossing by the French-built Poole Antelope (named after a pub on Poole High Street) from Cherbourg to Poole. A second ship was already under construction, to enter service in 1974. The ship and the company were the first RORO ferry to use the new terminal at Poole and the opening of this part of the port helped to address the increasing conflict between the tourist popularity of Poole Quay and the commercial shipping needs of the port.

It quickly became clear however that Poole Antelope and her French-registered sister; Dauphin de Cherbourg were unsuitable for their route with both ships struggling to keep to their schedule during the harsh winter of 1973, and a miscalculation in the amount of unaccompanied freight resulting in the passenger capacity of 12 lorry drivers being insufficient resulting in the unsatisfactory situation of drivers having to be flown across to the Channel to meet their trucks on arrival in France. Two larger ships were quickly chartered but these initial difficulties resulted in a restructuring of the company which saw French state controlled Compagnie Générale Maritime (CGM) and Chargeurs Réunis becoming involved in the company.

The involvement of CGM and Chargeurs resulted in substantial financial incentives being made available for two new ships to be built in French yards and replacement tonnage in the form of Purbeck and Coutances arrived in 1978. The new ships contributed to the company becoming profitable in 1980. The services of the new ships was not without mishap with an unfortunate incident occurring in September 1980 when the linkspan at Poole was damaged to the point of being unusable after a collision between it and Countances, which lost power on docking, leaving both damaged and saw Truckline services temporarily switch to Weymouth until the linkspan could be repaired, with handling undertaken by Sealink providing a boost to harbour income of over £10,000.

Over the first ten years of the companies life, freight volumes expanded considerably. In 1973, Truckline carried 2,324 lorries and by 1982 the figure was reported to be over 62,000 lorries and an additional 20,000 Italian car imports. This large increase in traffic, along with the unfortunate incident with the linkspan two years earlier prompted Poole Harbour Commissioners to expand the ferry port to 44 acres, with a further a 10m wide linkspan, opened in October 1984.

=== Takeover ===
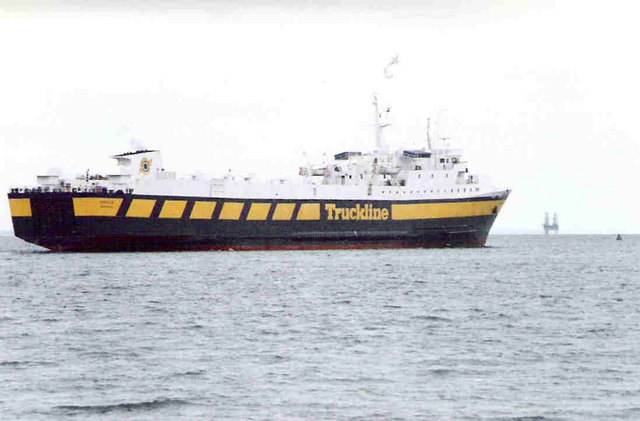
Purbeck leaving Poole Harbour in August 1986

It was revealed in the press in May 1985 that Truckline was in discussions about a takeover of the company (which was by now fully French owned), with bids coming from Sealink British Ferries, by then owned by Sea Containers, and Brittany Ferries. Both initial bids were refused.

In July 1985, Brittany Ferries announced they had purchased the company from Worms and CGM for an undisclosed amount. The Truckline name was to be retained on the Poole-Cherbourg service along with staff and the existing fleet and an immediate £3.5 million cash injection was made by Brittany Ferries to develop the service further. This resulted in two major moves by the company; the first to 'jumboize' the freight ships Coutances and Purbeck, which took place during the first half of 1986, the second being to introduce a new passenger service under the Truckline brand during the summer season from June 1986. As a result of the takeover, Brittany Ferries became the largest freight ferry operator on the Western Channel.

The passenger service, which was the first passenger ferry service from Poole, was operated by the Brittany Ferries vessel Cornouailles which had recently returned from a long-term charter with Sealink on the SNCF-operated service between Newhaven and Dieppe and operated under the banner of Les Routiers offering a value focused service inspired by the European restaurant grouping of the same name. The service was a success and was repeated in 1987, replaced with a larger ship, the ex-BCIF ferry Corbière in 1988 and expanded to a two boat service using the Trégastel in 1989.

In 1987 a new Truckline route was launched between Poole and Portugal, but this ceased in 1991.

The continued growth of both Truckline and the port at Poole resulted in a further expansion of the port. This was undertaken during 1989 with further land reclamations taking the total terminal area to 60 acres and included a third linkspan. The expansion was opened in April 1990 by former employment secretary Sir Norman Fowler.

=== Final years ===
The chairman; Peter Allsebrook, who had been awarded an CBE for services to the local community in the 1987 New Years Honours, died in March 1991. He was appointed High Sheriff of Dorset in 1990.

In 1990, Brittany Ferries announced plans to build to new ferries for their fleet. One entered service in 1992 as Normandie, the other was for Truckline services and during construction was lengthened to cater for increasing passenger numbers. This ferry eventually sailed as Barfleur to Poole for the first time in April 1992, becoming the largest ferry ever to dock at the port and requiring substantial dredging of the main access channel to facilitate access, along with construction of an upper deck to one of the Poole linkspans to accommodate the new ship. This record stood until 2007 when this record was surpassed by Bretagne and then again in 2010 by Armorique.

Operations under the Truckline name ceased in 1999, when Brittany Ferries rebranded the service under their own name.

== Fleet ==
Name	Built	In service	Tonnage	History
Poole Antelope	1973 (Dubegion-Normandie S.A., Le Grand-Quevilly, Rouen, France)	1973-1976	988 GT	Rebuilt in 1989 as a ROPAX ferry for Almar Shipping Co. Ltd, partially rebuilt in 1997 as a passenger ferry for UkrFerry, laid up 2010 as Caledonia in Ilychevsk near Odessa, Ukraine, fate unknown due to 2022 Russian invasion of Ukraine
ASD Astor	1970 (T. van Duijvendijk's Scheepswerf, Lekkerkerk, The Netherlands)	1973-1974	500 GT	Currently in service (as of 2025) as Maelys II in Dominican Republic/Haiti
Dauphin de Cherbourg	1974 (Dubegion-Normandie S.A., Le Grand-Quevilly, Rouen, France)	1974-1976	1,016 GT	Later flagged in China
Cotentin	1969 (Rickmers Werft, Bremerhaven, Germany)	1974-1978	994 GT	Scrapped in 2015
Dorset (previously Ulster Sportsman)	1970 (Rickmers Werft, Bremerhaven, Germany)	1976-1978	915 GT	Sank in 2010 at anchorage in Puerto La Cruz, Venezuela
Suffolk	1966 (Cantieri Navale Felzsegi S.p.A., Trieste, Italy	1977, 1978	1,211 GT	Sank off Jeddah in the 1990s
Coutances	1978 (Société Nouvelle des Ateliers et Chantiers du Havre, Le Havre, France)	1978-1999	2,736 GT	Sank in 2018 at anchorage in Puerto La Cruz, Venezuela
Purbeck	1978 (Société Nouvelle des Ateliers et Chantiers du Havre, Le Havre, France)	1978-1994, 1997	2,736 GT	Sank in 2018 at anchorage in Puerto La Cruz, Venezuela, hull caught fire during dismantling in 2023
Tourlaville	1969 (A. Vuyk & Zonen's Scheepswerven, Capelle aan den IJssel, Netherlands	1982-1984	758 GT	Scrapped at Aliağa Ship Breaking Yard in 2011
Arnage	1974 (Société Nouvelle des Ateliers et Chantiers du Havre, Le Havre, France)	1985	5,222 GT	Scrapped at Aliağa Ship Breaking Yard in 2001
Cornouailles	1977 (Trondhjems mekaniske Værksted, Trondheim, Norway)	1986-1988	6,918 GT	Scrapped at Aliağa Ship Breaking Yard in 2013
Armorique	1973 (Société Nouvelle des Ateliers et Chantiers du Havre, Le Havre, France)	1988	5,371 GT	Sank in 2011 off Madura, East Java
Corbière	1970 (Jos L. Meyer Verft, Papenburg, Germany)	1989-1991	4,371 GT	Scrapped at Aliağa Ship Breaking Yard in 2021
Trégastel	1971 (Schiffbau-Gesellschaft Unterweser AG, Bremerhaven, Germany	1989-1991	3,999 GT	Scrapped at Chittagong Ship Breaking Yard in 2022
Normandie Shipper	1973 (A. Vuyk & Zonen's Scheepswerven, Capelle aan den IJssel, Netherlands	1989-1991	8,104 GT	Scrapped at Aliağa Ship Breaking Yard in 2013
Barfleur	1992 (Kværner Masa-Yards Helsinki New Shipyard, Helsinki, Finland)	1992-1999	20,133 GT	Transferred to Brittany Ferries

== Routes ==
- (United Kingdom) Poole - (France) Cherbourg 1973-1999
- (United Kingdom) Poole - Portugal 1987-1991
- (United Kingdom) Poole - (Spain) Santander 1997-1998

== Former Truckline routes today ==
The former Truckline route between Poole and Cherbourg continues to be operated by Brittany Ferries using the Barfleur. The service was closed by Brittany in 2010, before reopening in early 2011 and being suspended again later the same year. The service resumed in 2013.

In June 2026, Brittany Ferries announced Barfleur was to be sold, and the Poole-Cherbourg route would close from November 2026. In the event, this was moved forward from 2 November 2026, to 12 October 2026 due to the need to redeploy Barfleur on the Cherbourg-Rosslare route due to gearbox problems with fleet mate Commodiore Clipper which also saw the early curtailment of the Portsmouth-Le Havre route on 22 September 2026.
