= Alexander Goudie =

Scottish painter (1933–2004)

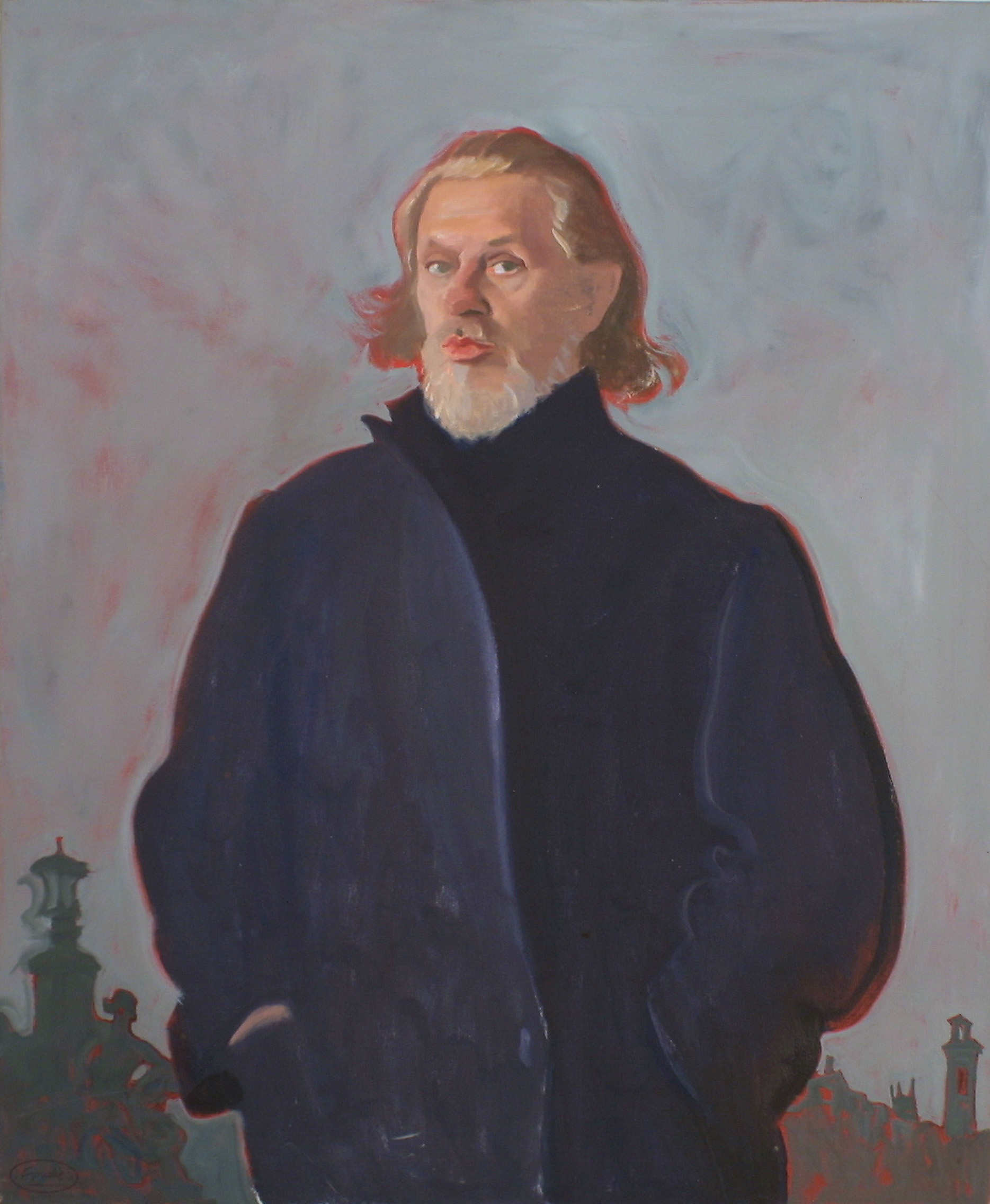
Alexander Goudie - Self-portrait

Alexander Goudie (11 November 1933 – 9 March 2004) was a Scottish figurative painter.

== Education and Training ==
Alexander Goudie was born in the Renfrewshire town of Paisley, Scotland, in 1933. He studied at the Glasgow School of Art under William Armour, David Donaldson, and Benno Schotz. There he was awarded the Somerville Shanks Prize for Composition.

For many years he was a tutor at the school, before dedicating himself to his own studio work.

== Career ==
=== The portraitist ===
As a portraitist his sitters included Her Majesty Queen Elizabeth II, Lord Chancellor Lord Mackay of Clashfern, and the comedian and actor Billy Connolly, as well as a host of other figures drawn from the worlds of politics, commerce, and entertainment. He was elected a member of the Glasgow Art Club in 1956 and a member of the Royal Society of Portrait Painters in 1970.

In 1979, he was the focus of a three-part BBC Television series, entitled 'Portrait'.

=== Brittany and the faienceries ===
Although he achieved renown as a portrait painter, Alexander Goudie distinguished himself in a range of other creative spheres. A lifelong association with Brittany resulted from marriage to his Breton wife Marie-Renee. For over 30 years, his summers were spent documenting the changing face of the rural landscape in sketchbooks and paintings, on harboursides and in the fields. The culmination of these decades of study came in 1989 with the commission to decorate the interior of the Brittany Ferries flagship, MV Bretagne.

Some years later he was chosen to revive the tradition of creative collaboration between artists and the famous ceramic faienceries of Quimper. The resulting series of ceramic sculptures depicting ‘Breton types’ bears testament to a way of life that had all but vanished at the end of the 20th century.

=== Robert Burns' Tam o' Shanter ===
Goudie held a fascination throughout his career with Robert Burns' narrative poem, Tam o' Shanter, and over many years he re-created the poem in paintings.

The final illustrative cycle of over 60 works, completed in 1999, would be purchased in its entirety and now resides on permanent public display at Rozelle House, near Burns’ home in Alloway, Ayrshire.

=== Salome ===
Alexander Goudie found literary inspiration in Oscar Wilde’s play Salome and Richard Strauss’s opera of the same name. When asked to create the décor for a production by Scottish Opera, the painter immersed himself in both the text and the music. He devised a host of designs for costumes and sets, which were fated not to appear on stage when the project met financial difficulties. Undeterred, Goudie transformed his vision into an exhibition of dramatic canvasses which was unveiled at the Edinburgh Festival in 1990.

== Influences and legacy ==
Alexander Goudie died in 2004 in Glasgow, Scotland. As a draughtsman and colourist, he drew inspiration from a broad range of subjects. In his studio in Glasgow, he worked painting portraits of society figures one day and immortalising the labouring Breton peasant the next. In character he was as theatrical as many of the canvasses to which he put his name. He saw himself in the tradition of figurative painting which stretched back from the work of his native Glasgow Boys, to encompass the influence of Paul Gauguin, Goya, Velázquez and Titian.

He identified with them in his strongly held belief that “the pictures should tell their own story” and that an artist should, above all else, “speak with a clear voice”. His son Lachlan Goudie, born 1976, is following in his father's footsteps as a painter as well as writing and presenting the BBC television series The Story of Scottish Art (2015) and presenting a BBC documentary celebrating the 150th anniversary of the birth of Charles Rennie Mackintosh (2018). His other son, Budock Goudie, is a pianist.

== Main recent exhibitions ==
- The Scottish Gallery (Edinburgh) - Alexander Goudie Memorial Exhibition (2006)
- Musée national de la Marine (Paris) - Brittany Ferries collection exhibition - L'Art est un Voyage (2006)
- Roger Billcliffe Gallery (Glasgow) - Goudie's Glasgow (2006)
- Ewan Mundy Fine Art (Glasgow) - Ete Mediterranean (2007)
- Paisley Museum (Paisley) - Joie de Vivre – The Art of Alexander Goudie (2008)
- Roger Billcliffe Gallery (Glasgow) - A portrait of Spain (2008)
- The Scottish Gallery (Edinburgh) - Still Lifes and Interiors (2011)
- The Scottish Gallery (Edinburgh) - Alexander Goudie : An Artist’s Life - Act I (2021)
