= MV Armorique (1973) =

Ship built in 1972

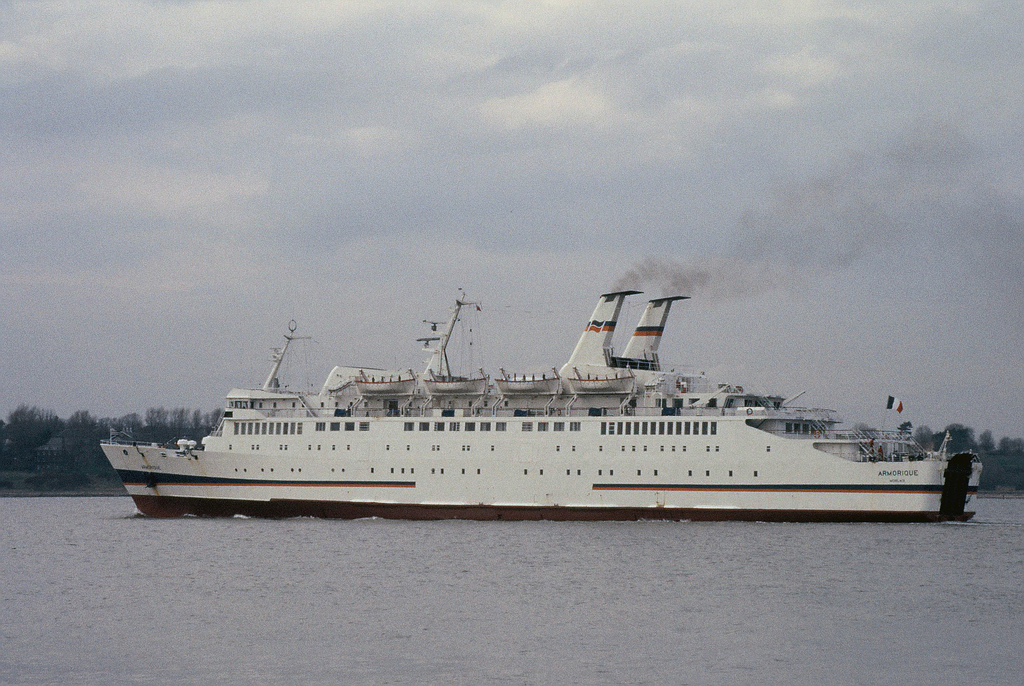
- Armorique leaving Harwich, 16 April 1986

History
- Name: Terje Vigen (1973-1975); Armorique (1975-1993); Min Nan (1993-1998); Sheng Sheng (1998-2005); Tirta Kincana I (2005-2008); Musthika Kencana II (2009-11)
- Owner: DA-NO Linien (1973); Skan-Fahrt K.G. (1973-75); Brittany Ferries (1975-93); Xiamen Ocean Shipping Co (1993-98); WeiHai Ferry Co (1998-2003); Dharma Lautan Utara (2003-05); Jalan Kangian (2005-11)
- Port of registry: , Oslo, Norway (1973-1975); Morlaix, France (1975-93); Xiamen, China (1993-98); Weihai, China (1998-2003); Surabaya, Indonesia (2003-11)
- Builder: Société Nouvelle des Ateliers du Havre
- Yard number: 205
- Launched: 24 April 1971
- Maiden voyage: 13 May 1972
- Identification: IMO number: 7108203; Call sign DIAV (1973-75); Call sign FNBX (1975-93); Call sign BBZU (1993-2003); Call sign YHYC (2003-11)
- Fate: Sunk in the Java Sea, 2011

General characteristics
- Type: Passenger ferry
- Tonnage: 5,371 GRT, 3,036 NRT, 1,168 DWT
- Length: 116.62 metres (382 ft 7 in)
- Beam: 19.23 metres (63 ft 1 in)
- Draught: 4.33 metres (14 ft 2 in)
- Depth: 11.16 metres (36 ft 7 in)
- Installed power: 2 x Pielstick diesel engines, 8,825 kilowatts (11,835 hp)
- Propulsion: Twin screw propellers
- Speed: 20 knots (37 km/h)
- Capacity: 700 passengers, 410 cars

Armorique was a passenger ferry which was built in 1973 as Terje Vigen for DA-NO Linien. She was sold to Brittany Ferries in 1975 and renamed Armorique. She was sold to Xiamen Ocean Shipping Co in 1993 and renamed Min Nan. In 1998, she was sold to the Weihai Ferry Co and renamed Sheng Sheng. In 2003, she was sold to Dharma Lautan Utama, Indonesia. In 2005, she was sold to Jalan Kangina, Surabaya and was renamed Tirta Kencana I. She was renamed Musthika Kencana II in 2009. She caught fire off Java on 4 July 2011 and sank the next day.

== Description ==
The ship was 116.62 metres (382 ft 7 in) long, with a beam of 19.23 metres (63 ft 1 in). She had a depth of 11.16 metres (36 ft 7 in) and a draught of 4.33 metres (14 ft 2 in). She was assessed at 5,371 GRT, 3,036 NRT, 1,168 DWT. The ship was powered by two Pielstick 12PC2V400 diesel engines, driving twin screw propellers. The engines were rated at 8,825 kilowatts (11,835 hp) and could propel the ship at 20 knots (37 km/h). She could carry 410 cars and accommodation for 700 passengers was provided.

== History ==
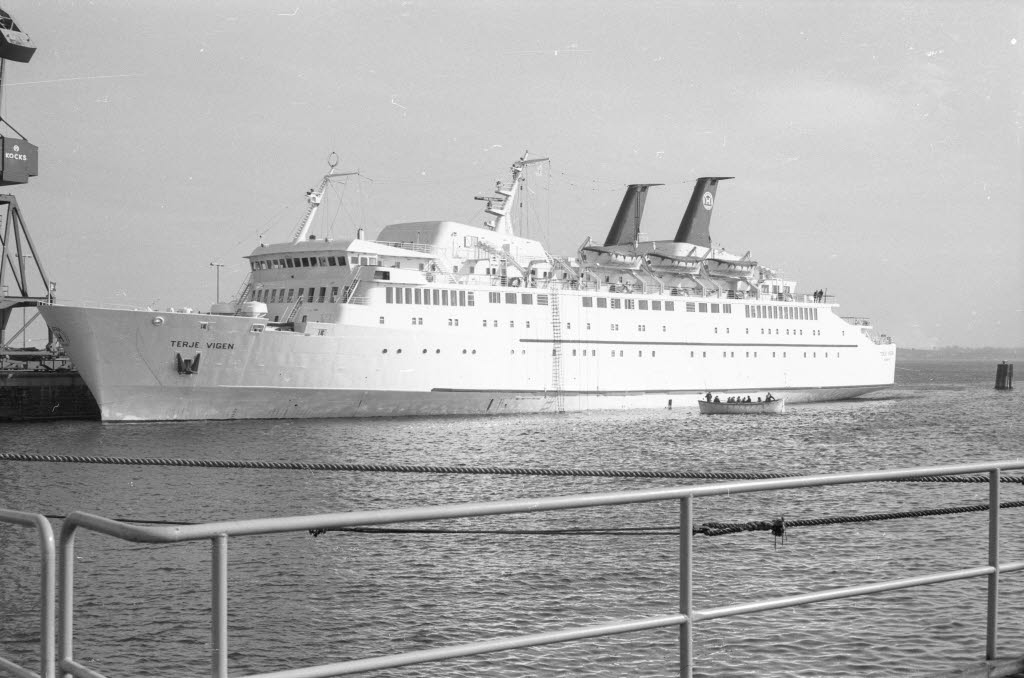
Terje Vigen 1972 in Kiel

The ship was built as yard number 205 by Société Nouvelle des Ateliers du Havre, Le Havre, France. She was launched on 24 April 1971 as Terje Vigen. She was delivered to DA-NO Linirn on 13 May 1972 for services between Oslo and Aarhus. Her port of registry was Oslo. The IMO Number 7108203, and call sign DIAV were allocated. She was sold to Skan-Fahre K.G., Hamburg, West Germany in 1973 and chartered to DA-NO Linirn. In May 1975, the ship was arrested due to financial problems at DA-NO Linirn. She was laid up at Aarhus but subsequently returned to service. In Autumn 1975, she was sold to Brittany Ferries, France with delivery scheduled for 1976. Her final day in service with DA-NO Linirn was 30 December 1975

In March 1976, she was renamed Armorique. The call sign FNBX was allocated. She entered service on the Roscoff - Plymouth route, then transferring to the Saint-Malo - Plymouth route in April. In May she was put on the Saint-Malo - Portsmouth route. On 6 June, she ran aground off Saint-Malo in fog and was damaged. Repairs were carried out at Le Havre. She was then laid up at Saint-Malo from September 1976 to May 1977, when she returned to the Saint-Malo - Portsmouth route. Armorique was again laid up at Saint-Malo from September 1977 to April 1978, when she entered service on the Plymouth - Santander route. She served on this route until May 1982, but also occasionally served on the Plymouth - Roscoff - Cork route during this time. She then transferred to the Roscoff - Cork route until she ran aground off Saint-Malo on 18 September. She was again repaired at Le Havre.

Armorique returned to service on the Roscoff - Cork route in March 1983. On 2 April, a fire broke out on the car deck when the ferry was 20 nautical miles (37 km) north of the Isles of Scilly. One person died and nineteen were injured before the fire could be extinguished. Seventy passengers and crew were evacuated from the ship and taken to the West Cornwall Hospital, Penzance. Six of them were detained, the rest later returned to the ship. Four lifeboats, four helicopters and a Hawker Siddeley Nimrod aircraft assisted in the rescue. The fire destroyed 66 berths. Following the fire, it was alleged that £2,000 belonging to the victim had been stolen. The money was subsequently found. Armorique operated the return Cork - Roscoff service, carrying 136 passengers. Following repairs, she returned to service on 9 April. In May 1984, she returned to the Saint-Malo - Portsmouth route, but was laid up in September, returning to the Plymouth - Roscoff route in December. In May 1985, she returned to the Saint-Malo - Portsmouth route, but was again laid up in September. From 25 March to 16 April 1986, she was chartered to SMZ and served on the Harwich - Hook of Holland route. The next month, she returned to the Saint-Malo - Portsmouth route, being laid up at Saint-Malo in September. She returned to service in May 1987 on the Saint-Malo - Portsmouth route, transferring to the Plymouth - Roscoff route on 16 September. From 27 May to 13 June 1988, Armoricain was chartered by Truckline Ferries and served on the Cherbourg - Poole route. She returned to the Saint-Malo - Portsmouth route on 14 June 1989. Following a brief lay-up in September, she served with British Channel Island Ferries on the Poole - Guernsey - Jersey route between 28 September and 9 October and also between 18 December and 2 January 1990.

Armorique transferred to the Saint-Malo - Portsmouth route on 3 January, serving until 12 February. In April and May, she served on the Caen - Portsmouth route, returning to the Saint-Malo - Portsmouth route on 18 May. On 6 September, she sustained damage to her propellers. Following repairs, she was laid up at Saint-Malo from 1 October. On 27 December, she was chartered by the French military and sailed to Toulon. In January 1991, she sailed from Toulon to Yanbu, Saudi Arabia via the Suez Canal. She carried 850 troops who were to participate in the First Gulf War. She returned to service on the Saint-Malo - Portsmouth route on 2 May. On 1 October, she transferred to the Cherbourg - Portsmouth route under charter. In November, she returned to the Saint-Malo - Portsmouth route.

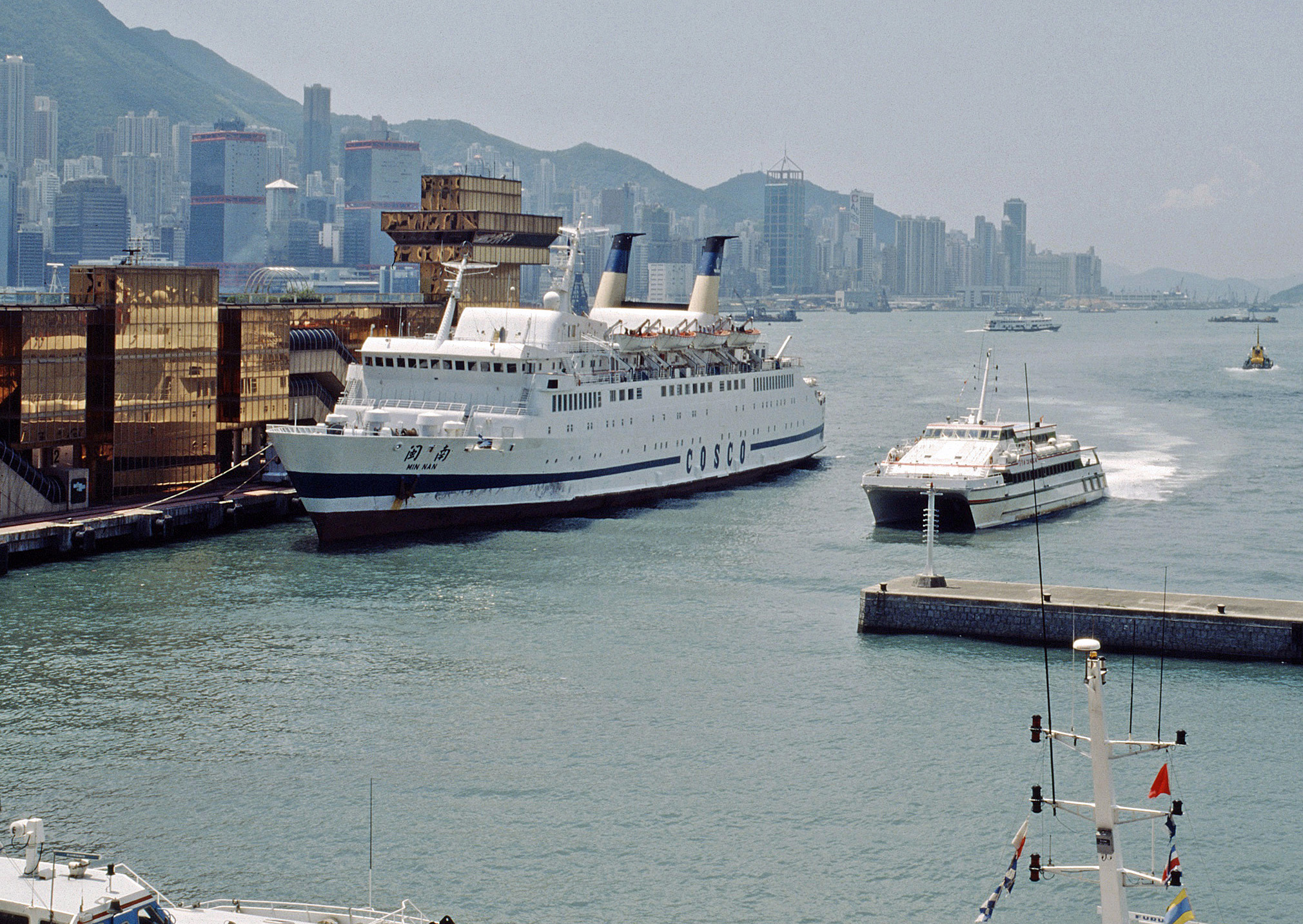
Min Nan 1995 in Hong Kong

On 6 January 1992, she was transferred to the Caen - Portsmouth route, returning to the Saint-Malo - Portsmouth route on 20 May. From 19 June to 28 August, she served on the Portsmouth - Cherbourg - Poole - Cherbourg - Poole - Saint-Malo route, then returning to the Saint-Malo - Portsmouth Route. She was laid up at Saint-Malo on 30 September. Armoricain was chartered to British Channel Island Ferries from 2 to 20 February 1993 and was then laid up at Cherbourg. She was moved to Saint-Malo in September.

On 18 December 1993, Armorique was sold to the Xiamen Ocean Shipping Company and was renamed Min Nan. The call sign BBZU was allocate. She entered service between Xiamen and Hong Kong in 1994. She was sold again in 1998 to Weihai Ferry Co and renamed Sheng Sheng. On 30 June 2003, she was sold to Dharma Lautan Utama, Belize. In 2005, she was sold to Jalan Kanginan, Surabaya, Indonesia and was renamed Tirta Kencana I. The call sign YHYC was allocated. She served on the Surabaya - Makassar route. On 1 January 2009, she was renamed Musthika Kencana II. On 4 July 2011, the ship caught fire off Madura, Java and was abandoned. She sank the next day.
