= Armorique =

Armorique may refer to:

- Armorica, an area of Brittany, France
- MV Armorique (disambiguation), a number of ships with this name
