= Nefertiti (ship) =

ROPAX ferry built in 2007

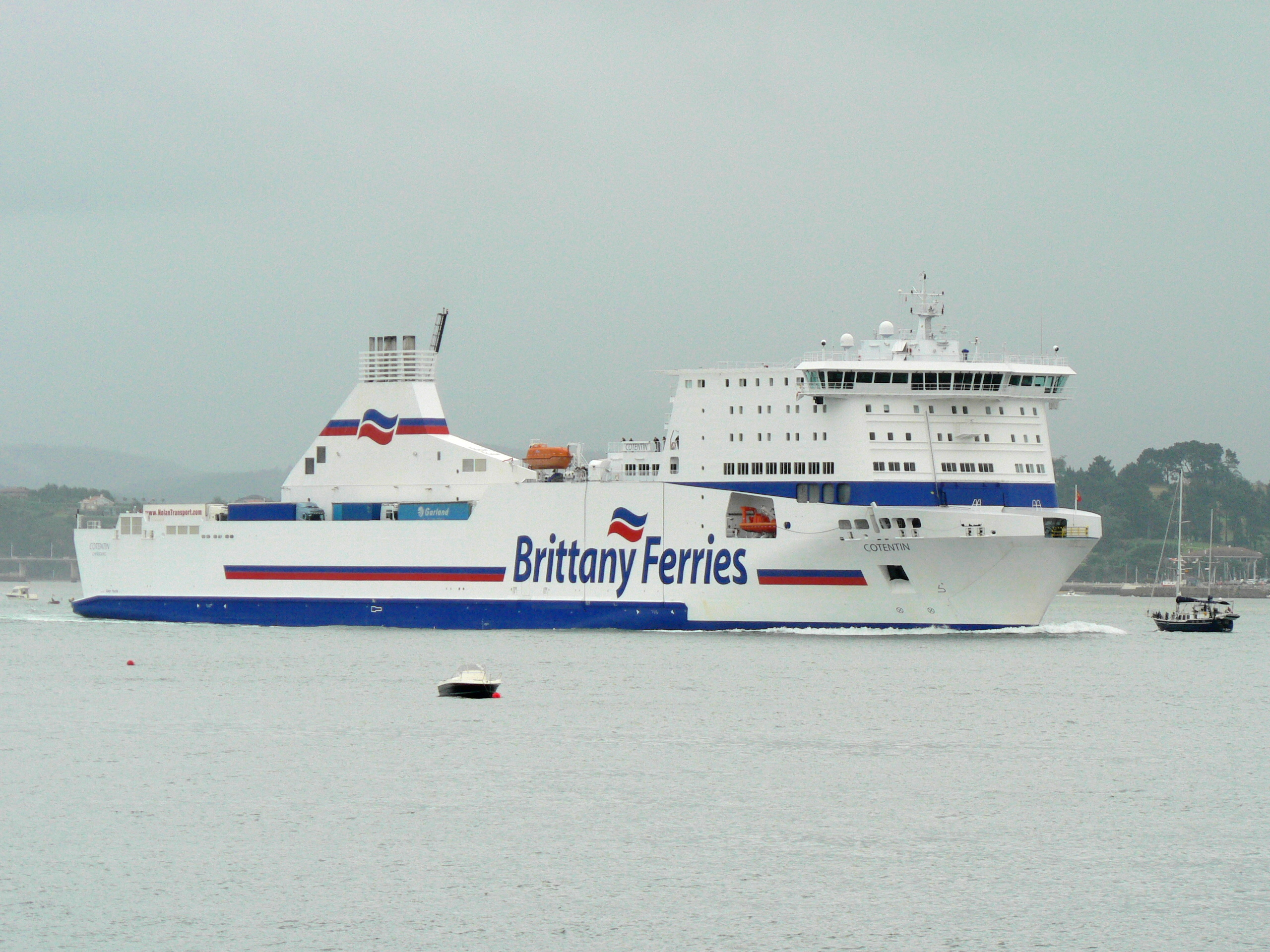
- Cotentin arriving in Santander

History
- Name: 2007–2013: Cotentin; 2013–2021: Stena Baltica; 2021–2026: Cotentin; 2026–present: Nefertiti
- Owner: 2007–2026: Brittany Ferries; 2026–present: Arab Bridge Maritime
- Operator: 2007–2013: Brittany Ferries; 2013–2021: Stena Line; 2021–2026: Brittany Ferries; 2026–present: Arab Bridge Maritime
- Port of registry: 2007–2013: Cherbourg, France; 2013–2021: Londra, United Kingdom; 2021–2026: Cherbourg, France; 2026–present: Aqaba, Jordan
- Builder: Aker Yards; Helsinki, Finland
- Yard number: 1357
- Launched: 13 September 2006
- Completed: November 2007
- Maiden voyage: 26 November 2007
- In service: 2007
- Identification: IMO number: 9364978; Call sign: JYAF3; MMSI: 438000162
- Status: in service

General characteristics
- Class & type: Ro-Pax ferry
- Tonnage: 22,308 GT
- Length: 165.00 m (541 ft 4 in)
- Beam: 26.80 m (87 ft 11 in)
- Draft: 6.25 m (20 ft 6 in)
- Installed power: 2 × MaK 12M43C diesel engines (24,000 kW)
- Propulsion: 2 × controllable pitch propellers
- Speed: 23 kn (26 mph; 43 km/h)
- Capacity: 213 passengers; 2,188 lane meters of freight

Nefertiti is a Ro-Pax ferry built in 2007 by Aker Yards in Helsinki, Finland, originally commissioned as the Cotentin for Brittany Ferries. Over its operational career, the vessel has served major European routes, including charters with Stena Line as the Stena Baltica, before being acquired in late 2026 by Arab Bridge Maritime, renamed Nefertiti, and transferred to the Jordanian flag for Middle Eastern service.

== Description ==
Cotentin is a ROPAX ferry that is 167 m (547 ft 11 in) long overall with a beam of 26.8 m (87 ft 11 in) and a draught of 6.2 m (20 ft 4 in). The vessel has a 22,308 gross tonnage (GT), a 6,692 net tonnage (NT) and measures 6,200 tons deadweight (DWT). Cotentin is powered by two MaK diesel engines creating a combined 21,600 kW (29,000 hp). This gives the vessel a maximum speed of 23 knots (43 km/h; 26 mph). (Note: The Dorset Echo claims the ship's engines create 24,000 kW (32,000 hp) and that Cotentin can sail to speeds up to 26 knots (48 km/h; 30 mph).)

The ferry has capacity for 213 passengers and is equipped with 216 cabins and has 10 decks. Cotentin has the ability to carry 120 freight vehicles and has 2,188 lane meters of vehicle storage area.

== Construction and service ==
=== Brittany Ferries ===
The vessel was ordered on 2 August 2005 for construction by Aker Finnyards in Finland for Brittany Ferries. The vessel was named after the Cotentin Peninsula of France of which Cherbourg is the largest town. Sea trials commenced on 26 September 2007, after which she returned to the shipyard for completion. She was delivered to Brittany Ferries on 9 November 2007 and undertook berthing trials in Portsmouth and Poole on 14 November 2007 prior to sailing to her homeport of Cherbourg arriving the next day. The ship was christened and her first commercial sailing was the 23:45 Cherbourg–Poole service on 26 November 2007. Cotentin replaced the Coutances on weekday Poole–Cherbourg sailings.

- Poole–Cherbourg
- Poole–Santander Weekend service

An October 2006 article in International Freighting Weekly included comments from a Brittany Ferries executive which suggested that the ship would be placed on the Poole–Cherbourg route and that the timetable currently operated by the Coutances would be amended to give more "social" departure times, specifically changing the 02:00 summer time departure from Cherbourg.

Up until July 2007 the Brittany Ferries Freight timetable showed a two-ship service on Poole–Cherbourg after the delivery of Cotentin, and no Portsmouth–Cherbourg sailings, indicating the company's intention to place the ship on the Poole–Cherbourg route alongside Barfleur. Newspaper articles covering the launch of the vessel stated that the vessel would primarily be used on the Poole route. Despite the initial announcement that the ship would run to Santander at the weekend a decision had not been made at the time as to whether this will be the ships Spanish destination due to port fees. Other ports that were in the running to receive Cotentin were Bilbao and Gijón.

On 21 July 2007 it was announced by Brittany Ferries that Cotentin would operate from Poole, a partially amended timetable for the Poole–Cherbourg route had been posted prior to the announcement though Cotentin sailings were absent until the delivery date was confirmed. The amendments allowed for Cotentin's Poole–Santander weekend sailings.

The 2008 timetable revealed on 12 September 2007 showed Cotentin entering service in mid-November 2007 on the Poole–Cherbourg route with services to Santander commencing shortly after. Initially the 2008 timetable showed that after Christmas Cotentin would move to the Caen route to provide refit cover for Mont St Michel before returning to Poole. Her place on the Cherbourg and Santander route was to have been taken by the Bretagne. However, shortly after its release the timetable was edited and Cotentin remained on the Cherbourg and Santander routes throughout January. From mid-May 2008 Cotentin commenced the new summer timetable with sailings on the Cherbourg route carried out in 3 hours 45 minutes as opposed to the previous 4 hours 30 mins on Coutances. The crossing time was extended after a short time operating the new timetable as a fuel saving measure.

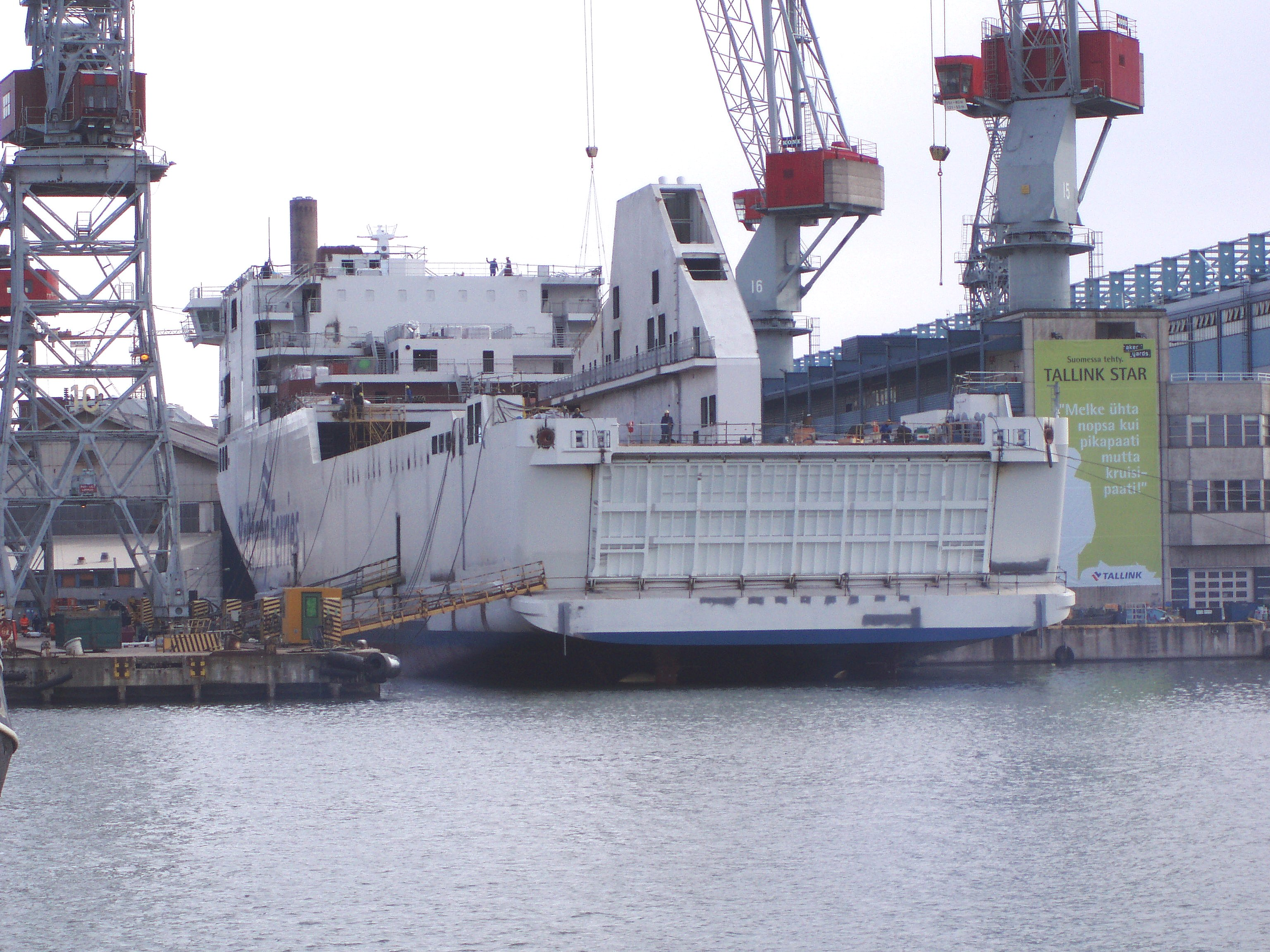
Cotentin under construction at Aker Finnyards Helsinki New Shipyard

=== Stena Line ===
In 2013 Cotentin was chartered to Stena Line for their service between Karlskrona, Sweden and Gdynia, Poland. She was renamed Stena Baltica and transferred from French to British flag with London as port of registry.

=== Return to Brittany Ferries ===
Amid rumours that the vessel would return to Brittany Ferries after the charter to Stena Line expired at the end of October 2020, the vessel emerged from dry dock in Gdańsk in Brittany Ferries' new livery. The ship later departed for Le Havre, where the vessel had its original name of Cotentin restored, and was reflagged back to Cherbourg, France.

Cotentin was confirmed to re-enter service from January 2021, between Poole and Cherbourg, providing extra capacity as part of the company's Brexit capacity agreement with the Government of the United Kingdom. The vessel would move to the Portsmouth to Le Havre service in April 2021, replacing the Etretat. The latter would be returned to Stena RoRo, having itself been replaced at Poole by fleetmate Barfleur. However, after delays in bringing Barfleur back into service, Cotentin will not leave the Cherbourg–Poole route.

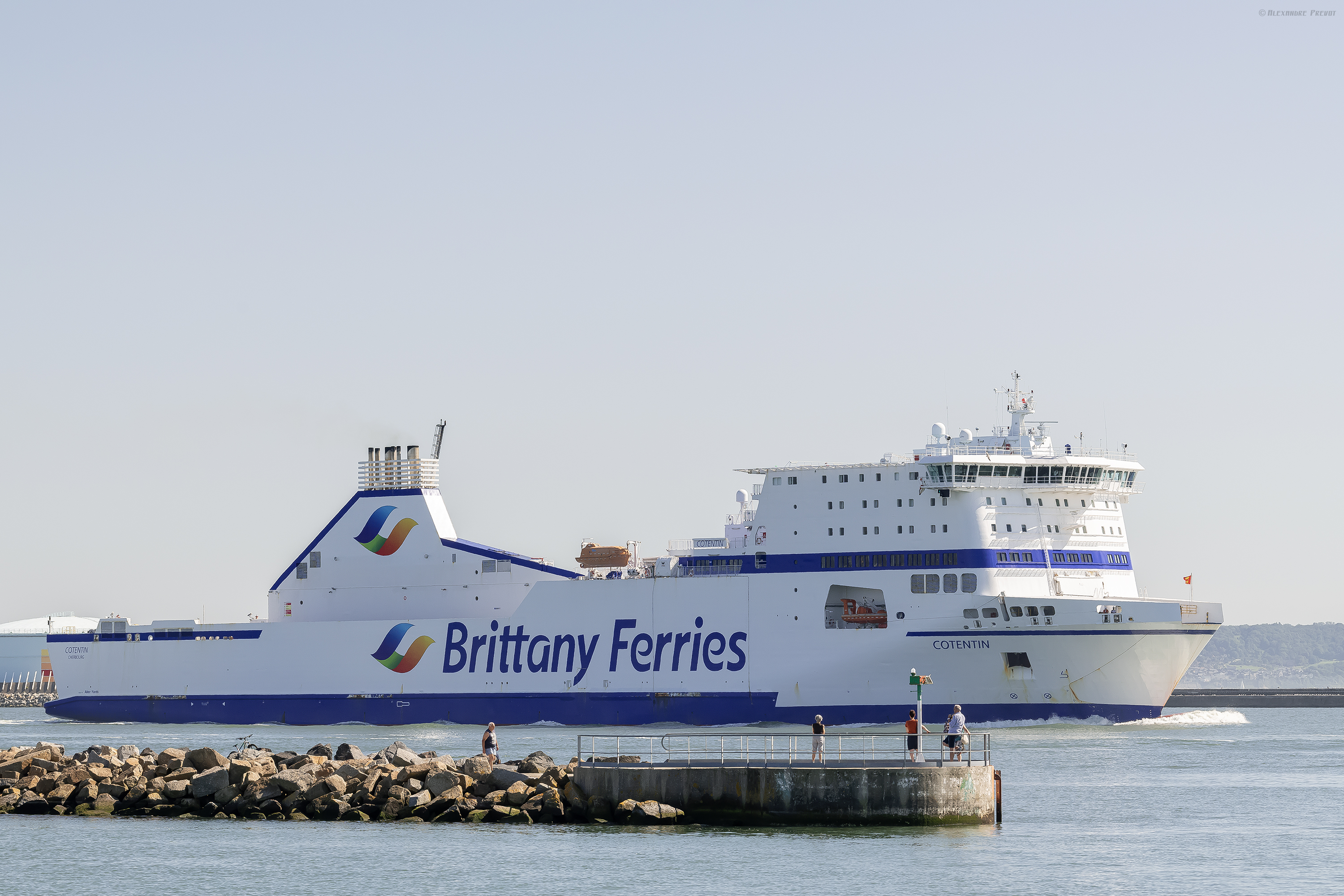
Cotentin in 2021

On 13 November 2021 Rosslare EuroPort reported the vessel had entered service on the Rosslare to Le Havre route.

In December 2022, Brittany Ferries announced that from 1 March 2023, Cotentin will start taking passengers onboard, excluding foot passengers and cyclists, to finally allow passengers to use the Portsmouth to Le Havre route, which has been closed to passengers since 2020. Cotentin will also take passengers on the Rosslare to Le Havre route, which was previously freight only.

In June 2026, Brittany Ferries announced the Barfleur and Cotentin would be sold when the Portsmouth to Le Havre and Poole to Cherbourg routes ceased in October 2026.

=== Arab Bridge Maritime ===
In 2026, Cotentin was sold to Jordanian-based company Arab Bridge Maritime as Nefertiti and reflagged under the flag of Jordan.
