= MV Armorique =

A number of vessels have been named Armorique, including:

- MV Armorique (1973), in service 1975–93;
- MV Armorique (2008), in service.
