= Alexis Gourvennec =

Breton farmer and economic activist (1936–2007)

Alexis Gourvennec (January 11, 1936, Henvic, Finistère - February 19, 2007) was a Breton pig farmer and economic leader who played a major role in the regeneration of Brittany, France, after World War II. In the early 1960s he was a leading militant in the Young Farmers' Movement, and in 1961 he helped found and led SICA (Societe d'Interet Collectif Agricole) St-Pol-de-Leon.

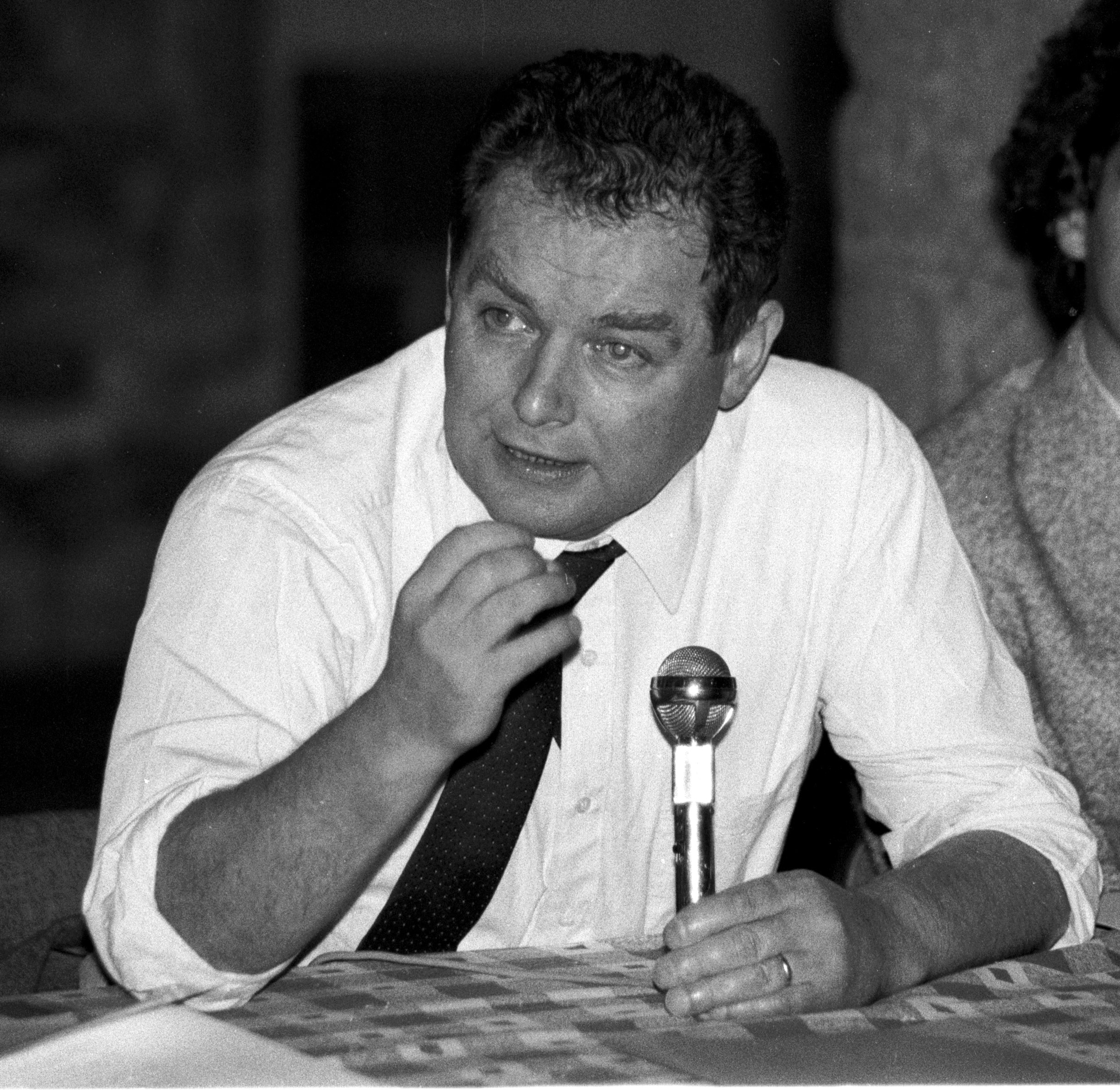
Alexis Gourvennec

He was a leader of a group of leading Bretons who pressed five key demands (from the regional structure plan) on the French administration in the late 1960s:

- A modern road network between the region and Paris
- The setting up of a telecommunications network
- A strengthening of educational provision especially Brest University
- Improving industrial development at Brest
- The construction of a deep-water port at Roscoff

The French government agreed to these demands in October 1968.

Gourvennec saw a place for Brittany as part of a 'Celtic arc', stretching down the entire Atlantic coastline of Europe, and was keen to develop a service from Roscoff to Plymouth. However, no existing ferry company viewed the route as worthwhile, and so Gourvennec and colleagues founded Brittany Ferries.

When Prince Charles visited Finistère in 1988, the local media apparently headlined his meeting with Gourvennec as 'Prince of Wales at the home of the Prince of Brittany' (see article by Peter Forde) probably in reference to the farmers' brand "Prince de Bretagne" created under Gourvennec's impulse.
