= MV Rosa Eugenia =

History
- Name: Rosa Eugenia (2008 - 2018); Outance (2008); Coutances (1978 - 2008)
- Owner: Truckline Ferries (1978 - 2008); Consolidated de Ferrys C.A. (2008 - 2018)
- Operator: Truckline Ferries (1978 - 2002); Brittany Ferries (2002 - 2008); Conferrys (2008 - 2018)
- Route: Puerto La Cruz - Magarita Island
- Builder: Ateliers et Chantiers du Havre
- Launched: 30 August 1977
- Completed: 1977, lengthened in 1986
- In service: 1978
- Identification: IMO number: 7528477; MMSI number: 775505000; Callsign: YYLC
- Fate: Sank in Puerto la Cruz, 2018

General characteristics
- Tonnage: 6,507 gross register tons (GRT)
- Length: 125.5 m (411.7 ft)
- Beam: 17.5 m (57.4 ft)
- Installed power: 2x MaK type 9M453AK medium-speed four-stroke diesel engines
- Speed: 18 kn (33 km/h; 21 mph)
- Capacity: 58 passengers; 64 vehicles

The M/V Rosa Eugenia, formerly the Coutances and Outances is a freight ferry owned by Conferry and previously operated by Brittany Ferries. It was built at Ateliers et Chantiers du Havre shipyard in France for Truckline Ferries and entered service in 1977. In 1985 Truckline was purchased by Brittany Ferries and in 1986 they sent Coutances and her sister Purbeck to be lengthened which increased their capacity by 34%. In 2004 Coutances was repainted in Brittany Ferries livery. She has sailed for most of her life between Poole and Cherbourg though was briefly replaced by the Normandie Shipper in the early nineties. In November 2007 Coutances was replaced on most Poole-Cherbourg sailings by the Cotentin, a new freight ferry constructed by Aker Finnyards. Coutances was withdrawn from service on 1 May 2008. In late July 2008 she was sold to Conferry of Venezuela owners of the former Purbeck, Coutances' sister ship.

Coutances sailed under the French flag and was registered in Cherbourg. As the Rosa Eugenia she is registered in Saint Vincent and the Grenadines

On the morning of 4 September 2018, the ferry began to sink on the outskirts of the Eulalia Buróz marine terminal, located in the city of Puerto la Cruz, Anzoátegui state.

== Regular routes ==
- Puerto la Cruz - Isla Margarita

As the Coutances with Brittany Ferries and Truckline the ship sailed on the following routes:-

- Poole-Cherbourg

Primary route from 1977 until November 2007. Then weekends only from end of November 2007 until end of February 2008. Sundays only from 1 March 2008. Coutances final sailing on this route was the 16:00 Poole-Cherbourg on 28 April 2008.

- Portsmouth-Caen

Primary route from end of November 2007. Monday to Thursday only until 30 April 2008.

- Portsmouth-Cherbourg

Weekly positioning move from end of November 2007. Coutances final commercial Brittany Ferries sailing was on this route on 1 May 2008.

== Other routes served ==
As the Coutances the ship has also served on Portsmouth-Caen (Ouistreham) in the early years of the route where she provided extra freight capacity. She has also seen use on Plymouth-Roscoff and Plymouth-Santander.

On 13 December 2007 Coutances sailed from Portsmouth to the Channel Islands on charter to Condor Ferries to cover for the damaged Commodore Goodwill.
