= Brittany Ferries =

French (Breton) ferry operator

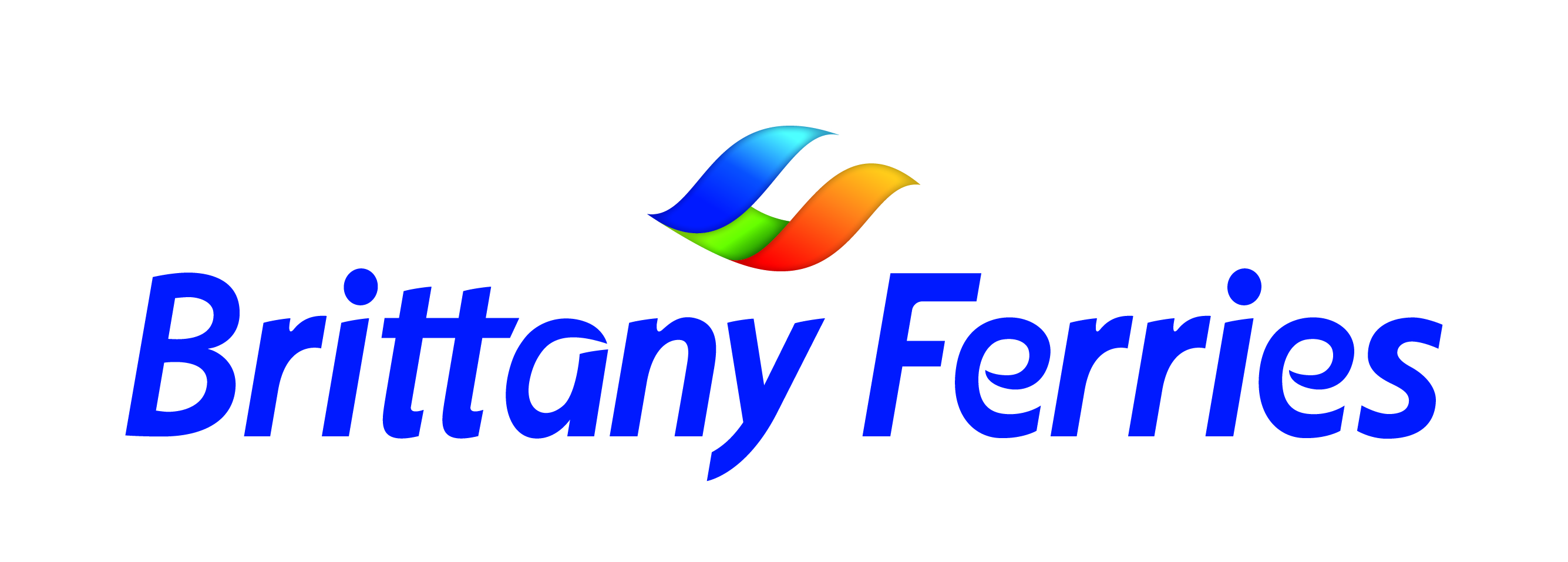

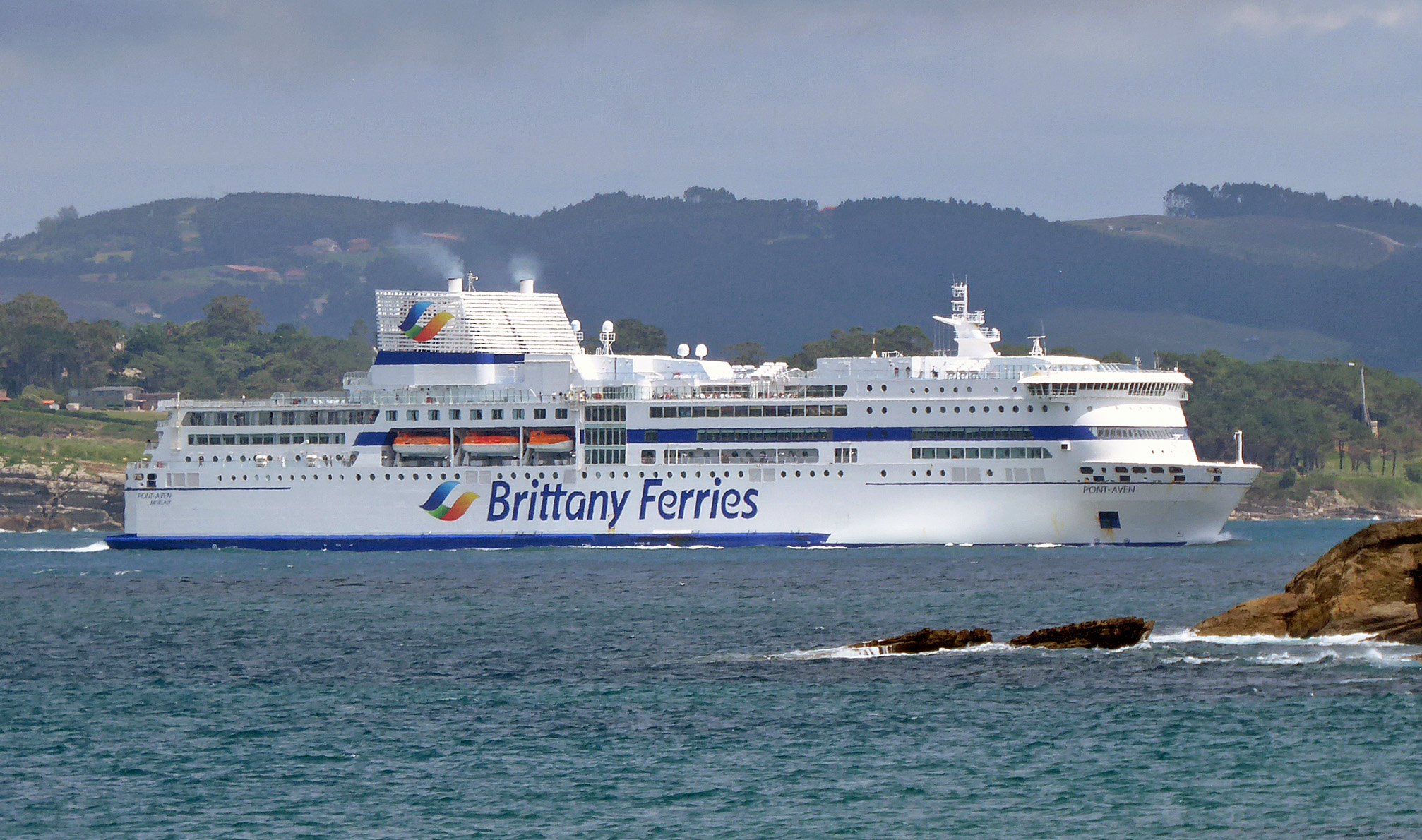
- Pont-Aven arriving in Santander
- Type: Private company
- Industry: Passenger transportation Freight transportation Holidays
- Founded: 1973
- Founder: Alexis Gourvennec
- Headquarters: Roscoff, France
- Area served: Channel Islands; France; Ireland; Spain; United Kingdom
- Key people: Jean-Marc Roué (Chairman); Christophe Mathieu (CEO); Frédéric Pouget; Corinne Vintner
- Revenue: €516. million (2024)
- Net income: €47 million (2024)
- Owner: BAI Bretagne Angleterre Irlande S.A.
- Number of employees: ▼2,787 (2018 average – high and low seasons)
- Website: brittany-ferries.co.uk brittany-ferries.fr brittany-ferries.ie

BAI Bretagne Angleterre Irlande S.A. trading as Brittany Ferries is a French shipping company based in Roscoff, France. Founded in 1973 by Alexis Gourvennec, it operates passenger and freight services between the Channel Islands, France, Ireland, Spain and the United Kingdom.

== History ==
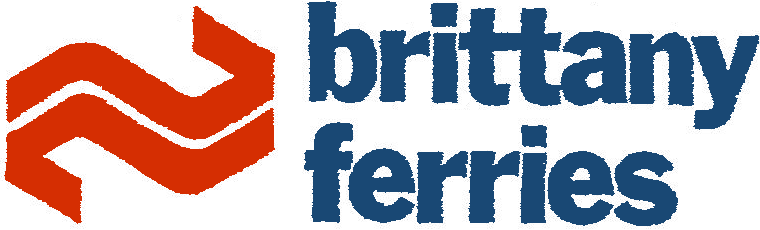
Brittany Ferries logo until 1984

BAI (Bretagne Angleterre Irlande) S.A. was founded by Alexis Gourvennec. Working with fellow Breton farmers, Gourvennec lobbied for improvements to Brittany's infrastructure, including better roads, telephone network, education and port access. By 1972, he had successfully secured funding and work to develop a deep-water port at Roscoff. Gourvennec had no desire to run a ferry service, but existing operators showed little appetite for the opportunity.

The company itself began sailings on 2 January 1973 between Roscoff in Brittany and Plymouth in the South West of England, using the freight ferry Kerisnel, a former Israeli tank carrier. The company's primary aim at that time was to exploit opportunities presented by the UK's entry into the European Common Market, forerunner to the European Union, in order to export directly to markets in the United Kingdom.

In 1974, Kerisnel was replaced by Penn-Ar-Bed, which carried both passengers and vehicles, and the BAI company adopted the name Brittany Ferries.

=== Acquisitions and partnerships ===
It was revealed in the press in May 1985 that Truckline Ferries was in discussions about a takeover of the company (which was by now fully French-owned), with bids coming from Sealink British Ferries, owned by Sea Containers, and Brittany Ferries. Both initial bids were refused, but in July 1985, Brittany Ferries announced they had purchased Truckline Ferries from Worms and CGM for an undisclosed amount. The Truckline name was to be retained on the Poole–Cherbourg service along with staff and the existing fleet and an immediate £3.5 million cash injection was made to develop the service further. This resulted in two major moves by the company; the first to 'jumboize' the freight ships Coutances and Purbeck, which took place in the first half of 1986, the second was to introduce a new passenger service under the Truckline brand during the summer season from June 1986. As a result of the takeover, Brittany Ferries became the largest freight ferry operator on the Western Channel.

In 1990 Brittany Ferries joined forces with Emeraude Ferries and British Channel Island Ferries to launch a 'French Connection' service which would allow a Poole–Jersey, Jersey–Saint-Malo, Saint-Malo–Portsmouth round trip to be booked as a single journey across the three operators.

Operations under the Truckline name ceased in 1999, when Brittany Ferries rebranded the service under their own name.

In 2001, Brittany Ferries launched a joint service with Condor Ferries for fast ferry services between Poole and Cherbourg during the summer. The Condor Vitesse was used with dual-branding of both companies. Between 2022 and 2023, Condor operated summer weekend services between, Portsmouth, Cherbourg and Poole using the Condor Liberation.

=== Service changes ===
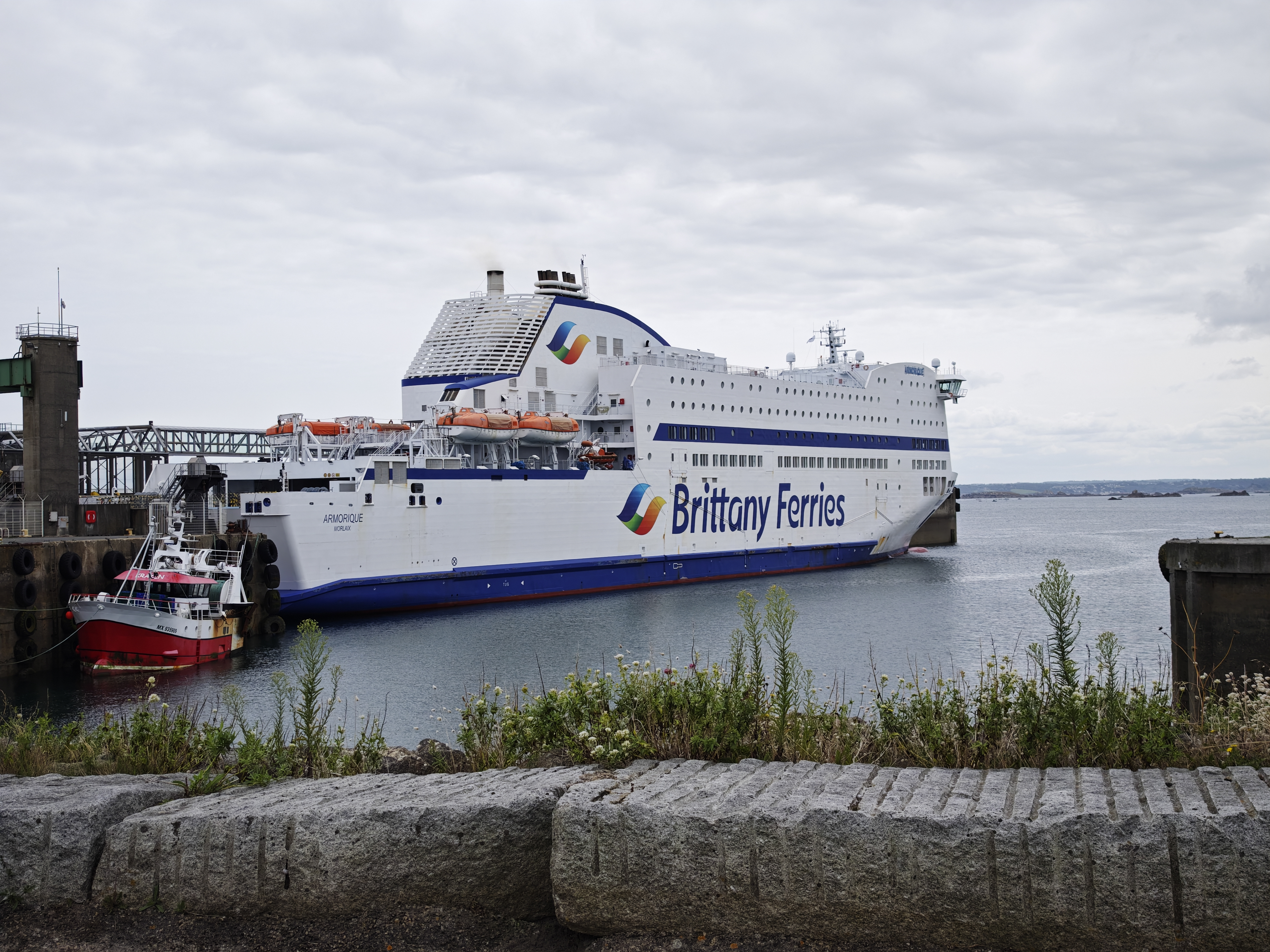
Armorique at Roscoff

In late 2009, the new Poole–Santander freight-only service was deemed a success, and the frequency was doubled: there would now be two services a week operated by Cotentin. In November 2009, Armorique was laid up for the rest of the winter season. Major changes were announced in December 2009. Barfleur was withdrawn from service at the end of January 2010 after nearly 18 years of service on the Poole–Cherbourg route. The service was temporarily served by Armorique, which came back to service earlier than originally planned. The Poole–Santander service reverted to one sailing a week with Cotentin covering freight on the Poole–Cherbourg service in the absence of Barfleur. Condor Vitesse continued to operate one round sailing a day in the summer months between the two ports. Cap Finistère ran between Portsmouth and Santander twice a week and also operated three round-trip a week between Portsmouth and Cherbourg. In September 2010, Brittany Ferries announced plans to serve the Portsmouth–Bilbao route recently abandoned by P&O Ferries. The route started on 27 March 2011.

=== Strike action ===
On 21 September 2012, Brittany Ferries cancelled sailings indefinitely following two days of wildcat strikes caused by crew members who were unhappy with changes in working terms and conditions. Meetings took place between management and unions to negotiate the management proposals. A vote was taken on 30 September by union members to decide if the management proposals would be accepted. The crew members accepted the proposal, and services resumed on 2 October after 12 days without services. During this period, Brittany Ferries made special arrangements with P&O Ferries and MyFerryLink to accept tickets on the Dover–Calais route. Unused tickets were refunded. Condor Ferries operated extra sailings on behalf of Brittany Ferries.

=== Irish and Spanish operations ===
Brittany Ferries logo until 2018

In 2018, Brittany Ferries commenced service between Cork and Santander. This was cancelled and effectively replaced in February 2020 by the Rosslare–Bilbao service, which runs twice weekly. A seasonal service between Rosslare and Roscoff is also offered.

=== Impacts from the COVID-19 pandemic ===
From late March 2020, due to the ongoing COVID-19 pandemic, Brittany Ferries was forced to cancel all passenger sailings until 15 May 2020 after British government advice was issued against all travel. Initially they had been offering refund vouchers valid for 2 years for affected customers. Many customers were unsatisfied with vouchers and had requested a refund. Brittany Ferries had begun to issue refunds in the last week of April for customers who wished for a refund. Customers were entitled to a refund under EU regulation 1177/2010.

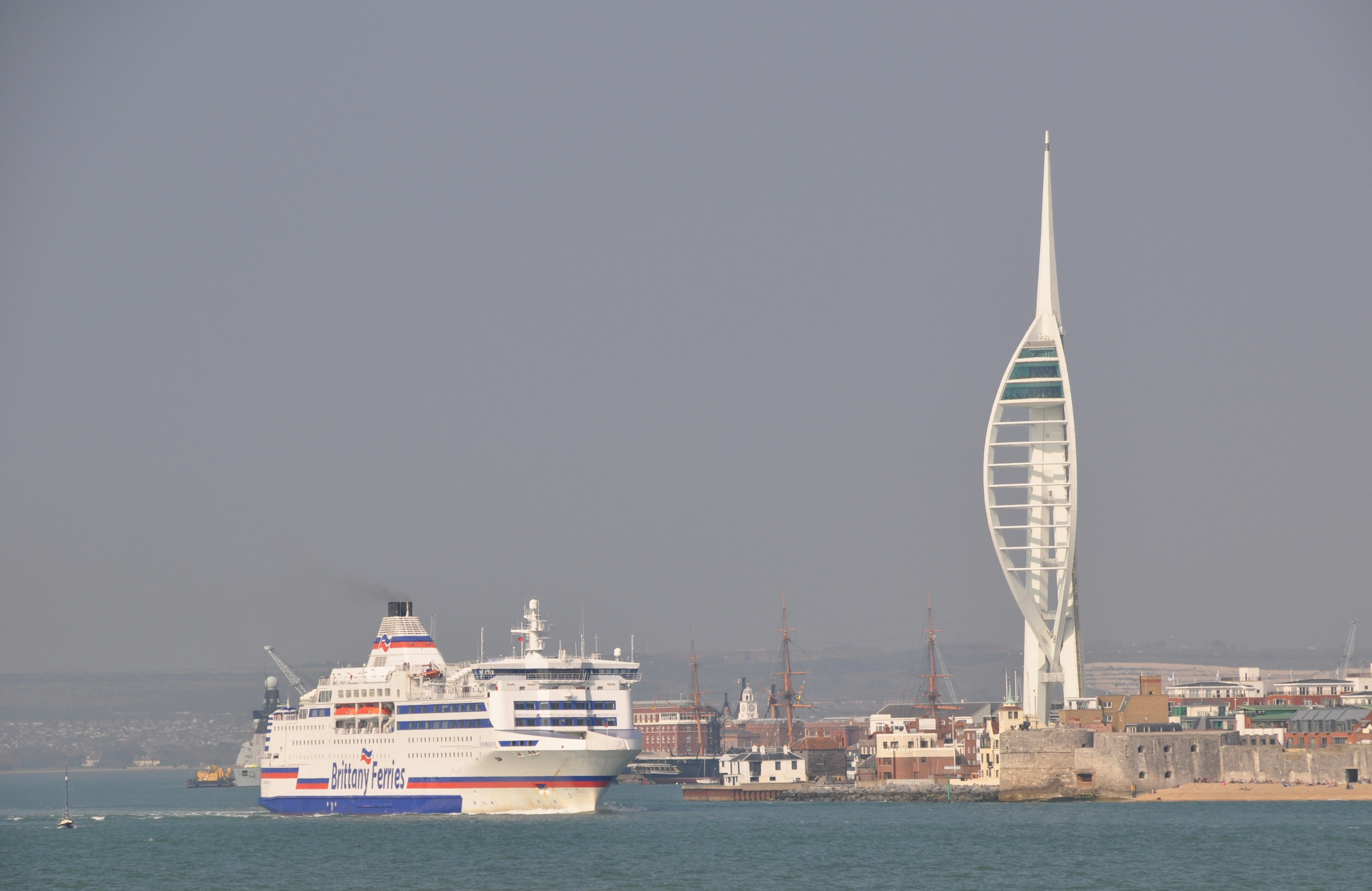
Normandie passing the Spinnaker Tower

On 23 July 2020, Brittany Ferries announced the launch of a brand new Rosslare–Cherbourg service.

On 19 August 2020, as a consequence of the ongoing COVID-19 crisis, the company confirmed that it was reducing ferry services from the end of August and laying up various ships, beginning with Armorique and Bretagne. Further schedule changes were likely in the months ahead, the company confirmed in March 2021. It also confirmed the launch of a five-year recovery plan following the loss of more than half of its revenue, the consequence of restrictions on passenger traffic in all markets in which it operates.

=== Fleet investment ===
On 20 July 2021, Brittany Ferries announced at a press conference in Paris that it had secured a charter with Stena RoRo for 2 more E-Flexers. The new vessels are due to replace the Normandie on the Portsmouth–Caen route and Bretagne on the Portsmouth–St Malo Route. The charter is expected to run for 10 years with the option to purchase after 4 years.

=== Expansion into the Channel Islands ===
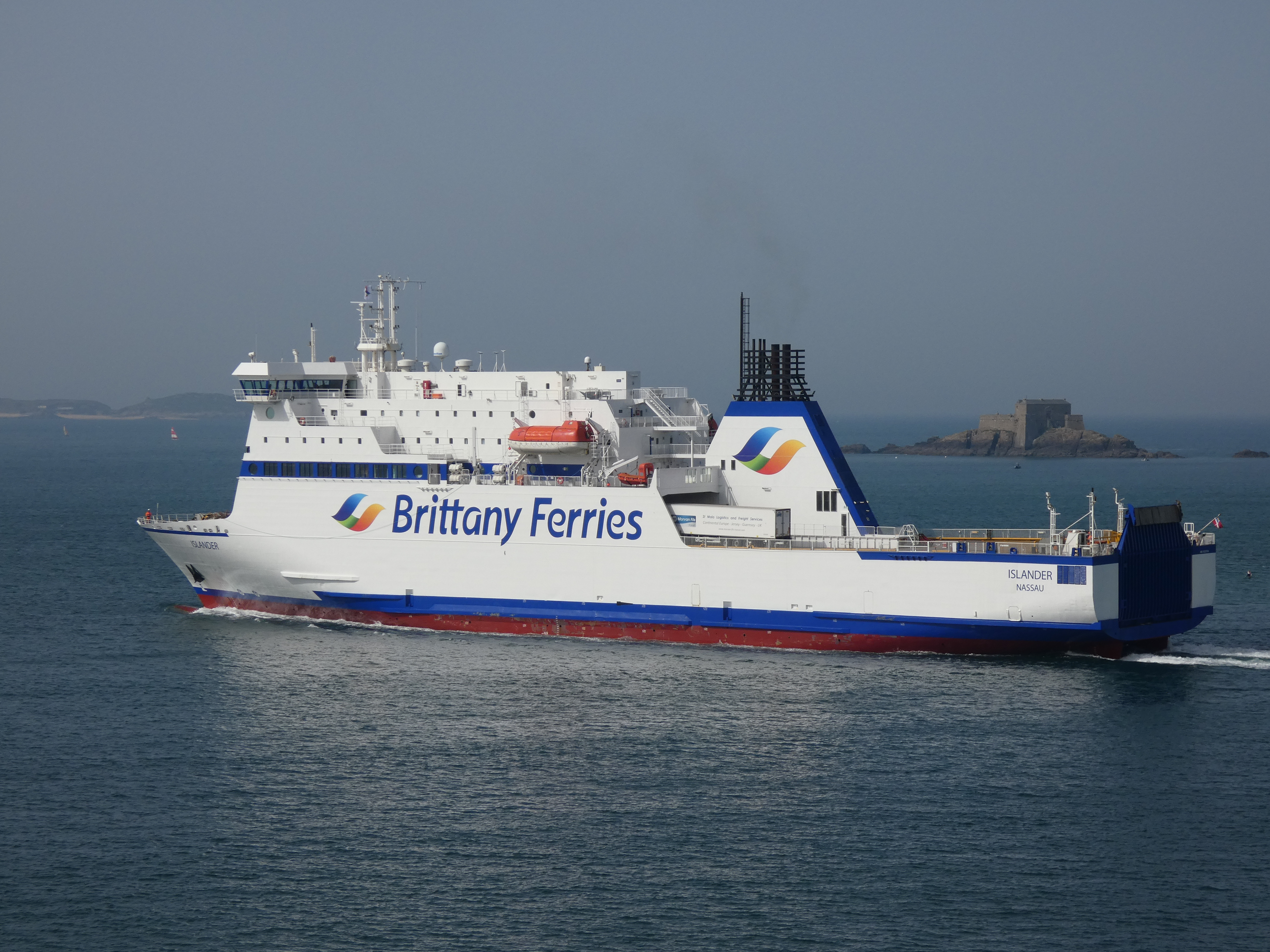
Islander departing Saint-Malo

In 2019, Brittany Ferries purchased a minority stake in Condor Ferries, forming a consortium with the European Sustainable Infrastructure Fund managed by Columbia Threadneedle Investments, which purchased the remaining majority.

On 8 August 2024, Brittany Ferries announced its intention to become the majority stakeholder of Condor with a 51% stake, pending approval of regulators in Jersey and Guernsey. The company received regulatory approval for the move in September 2024, later signing a new 15-year contract with Guernsey in December 2024. This was announced after Jersey appointed DFDS Seaways as their chosen operator.

Following Jersey's decision, Brittany Ferries launched legal action for a judicial review against Jersey's Minister for Sustainable Economic Development, Deputy Kirsten Morel. Legal action was denied in January 2026 by Jersey's Court of Appeal, who later ordered Brittany Ferries to pay DFDS £40,000 in legal fees and an undisclosed amount to Deputy Morel.

Services to Guernsey began on 28 March 2025, and saw the Islander transfer to Brittany Ferries to operate Portsmouth services and the return of the former Normandie Express, now the Voyager, to operate between Saint-Malo, Guernsey and Poole, and a weekly sailing to Jersey. The Commodore Clipper was also transferred and would be used elsewhere across the network following its charter by Brittany Ferries from 2024, and as a back-up vessel when required. Brittany Ferries would later become the sole owner of Condor on 7 April 2025.

The Guernsey operation has led to the island's market share of ferry passengers from the UK to the Channel Islands exceeding 50%, overtaking Jersey for the first time, and an overall 60% increase in French passengers travelling to the island in 2025.

In December 2025, a working group between Brittany Ferries, the States of Guernsey and ferry operators Islands Unlimited and Manche Îles Express was established to improve inter-island links between Guernsey and Jersey. Initially, DFDS and the States of Jersey were not included, but joined shortly after

In late February 2026, Brittany Ferries entered an agreement with Islands Unlimited to allow bookings and reservations with Islands Unlimited to be made on Brittany Ferries' website. This aims to further bolster inter-island travel between Guernsey and Jersey.

=== Legal action with DFDS ===
In May 2025, Brittany Ferries launched legal action against DFDS, demanding £125 million of compensation over grants received by DFDS from the Syndicat Mixte Transmanche in Normandy for its Dieppe and Newhaven operations. Brittany Ferries blamed "significant market distortion" resulting in losses on its Portsmouth operations and also submitted a complaint to the Directorate-General for Competition of the European Union.

=== Route closures and changes ===
On 30 June 2026, Brittany Ferries announced it would close the Poole–Cherbourg and Portsmouth–Le Havre routes and sell the Barfleur and Cotentin citing "rising tax burdens, COVID loan repayments, cost-of-living concerns among passengers and unfair competition on the Eastern Channel". Further planned changes included the transfer of the Commodore Clipper to the Rosslare–Cherbourg route and the creation of a triangular route between Portsmouth, Guernsey and Cherbourg using the Islander.

The final sailing of Barfleur and the closure of the Poole to Cherbourg route was originally scheduled for 2 November 2026, however due to gearbox problems with Commodore Clipper which resulted early closure of the Portsmouth-Le Havre route on 22 September 2026, Barfleur was required to take Commodore Clipper's place on the Cherbourg-Rosslare route. Barfleur made her last crossing from Poole on 12 October 2026, closing the route.

== Routes ==
=== Channel Island ===
- Portsmouth ⇄ Guernsey: Islander
- Portsmouth – Guernsey – St Malo: Islander
- St Malo – Guernsey – Jersey: Voyager
- St Malo – Guernsey – Poole: Voyager

=== French ===
- Plymouth ⇄ Roscoff: Armorique and Pont-Aven
- Portsmouth ⇄ Caen: Guillaume de Normandie and Mont St Michel
- Portsmouth ⇄ Cherbourg: Galicia and Salamanca
- Portsmouth ⇄ Le Havre: Commodore Clipper
- Portsmouth ⇄ St Malo: Saint-Malo

=== Irish ===
- Cork ⇄ Roscoff: Armorique and Pont-Aven
- Rosslare ⇄ Bilbao: Santoña
- Rosslare ⇄ Cherbourg: Cotentin, Norbay and Salamanca

=== Spanish ===
- Plymouth ⇄ Santander: Pont-Aven
- Portsmouth ⇄ Bilbao: Galicia
- Portsmouth ⇄ Santander: Salamanca

== Fleet ==
=== Current fleet ===
| Ship | Vessel type | Built | Entered service | Tonnage | Port of registry | Notes | Image |
|---|---|---|---|---|---|---|---|
| Armorique | Cruiseferry | 2009 | 2009 | 29,468 GT | Morlaix | | |
| Barfleur | Cruiseferry | 1992 | 1999 | 20,133 GT | Cherbourg | Transferred from Truckline Ferries | |
| Commodore Clipper | ROPAX ferry | 1999 | 2025 | 13,456 GT | Nassau | | |
| Galicia | Cruiseferry | 2020 | 2020 | 41,671 GT | Morlaix | Chartered from Stena RoRo | |
| Guillaume de Normandie | Cruiseferry | 2024 | 2025 | 38,000 GT | Morlaix | | |
| Islander | ROPAX ferry | 2005 | 2025 | 13,906 GT | Nassau | Leased from the States of Guernsey | |
| Mont St Michel | Cruiseferry | 2002 | 2002 | 35,586 GT | Caen | | |
| Norbay | ROPAX ferry | 1994 | 2026 | 17,464 GT | Hamilton | Chartered from P&O Ferries | |
| Pont-Aven | Cruiseferry | 2004 | 2004 | 40,859 GT | Morlaix | | |
| Saint-Malo | Cruiseferry | 2024 | 2025 | 38,000 GT | Morlaix | | |
| Salamanca | Cruiseferry | 2021 | 2022 | 41,863 GT | Morlaix | Chartered from Stena RoRo | |
| Santoña | Cruiseferry | 2022 | 2023 | 42,400 GT | Morlaix | Chartered from Stena RoRo | |
| Voyager | High-speed craft ferry | 2000 | 2005 | 6,581 GT | Nassau | | |

=== Future fleet ===
| Ship | Vessel type | Built | To enter service | Notes |
|---|---|---|---|---|
| Wexford | ROPAX ferry | 1999 | 2027 | Chartered from Grimaldi Group, to replace Norbay. Currently in service with Corsica Linea as Vizzavona |

=== Former fleet ===
| Ship | Built | In service | Tonnage | Current status |
|---|---|---|---|---|
| Kerisnel | 1973 | 1973 | 1,983 GT | Sank while under tow to Turkish breakers on 15 May 2014 |
| Bénodet | 1970 | 1983–1985 | 4,317 GT | Scrapped in Turkey, 2021 |
| Goelo | 1967 | 1980–1982 | 5,149 GT | Scrapped in Turkey, 2001 |
| Penn-Ar-Bed | 1974 | 1974 | 6,399 GT | Scrapped in India, 2004 |
| Armorique | 1972 | 1976–1993 | 8,181 GT | Sunk in The Java Sea, 2011 |
| Cornouailles | 1977 | 1977 | 6,918 GT | Scrapped in Turkey, 2013 |
| Reine Mathilde | 1970 | 1978–1992 | 7,747 GT | Scrapped in India, 2005 |
| Breizh Izel | 1970 | 1980 | 6,576 GT | Scrapped in Turkey, 2014 |
| Tregastel | 1971 | 1985 | 8,696 GT | Sold to Baaboud Shipping as MS Noor. Sold for scrap in 2022 |
| Coutances | 1970 | 1985–2008 | 6,507 GT | Sank in Puerto la Cruz, 2018 |
| Purbeck | 1978 | 1985 | 6,507 GT | Sank in Puerto la Cruz, 2018 |
| Quiberon | 1975 | 1982–2002 | 11,813 GT | Renamed D'Abundo and sent to Alang for scrapping |
| Duc de Normandie | 1978 | 1986–2005 | 13,505 GT | Scrapped in Aliaga in 2021 as the Damla |
| Duchesse Anne | 1979 | 1988–1996 | 9,795 GT | Since 1996, with Jadrolinija as Dubrovnik |
| Val de Loire | 1986 | 1993–2006 | 31,564 GT | Since 2006, with DFDS Seaways as King Seaways |
| Pont l'Abbé | 1978 | 2006–2009 | 17,564 GT | Since 2009, with Moby Lines as Moby Corse |
| Baie de Seine | 2001 | 2015–2020 | 22,382 GT | Returned to DFDS Seaways in 2020 as Sirena Seaways |
| Kerry | 2001 | 2019–2020 | 24,418 GT | Returned to Stena Line in 2020 |
| Etretat | 2008 | 2014–2021 | 26,904 GT | Returned to Stena Line in 2021, as Stena Livia |
| Cap Finistère | 2001 | 2010–2022 | 32,728 GT | Sold to Grandi Navi Veloci in 2022 as GNV Spirit |
| Connemara | 2007 | 2018–2022 | 27,414 GT | Sold to StraitNZ in 2022 as Connemara |
| Bretagne | 1989 | 1989–2024 | 24,534 GT | Sold to Baleària in 2025 as Rosalind Franklin |
| Normandie | 1992 | 1992-2025 | 27,451 GT | Sold to La Méridionale in 2025 as Massalia |
| MN Pelican | 1999 | 2016-2025 | 12,076 GT | Returned to lessor |
| Cotentin | 2007 | 2007–2013 2021–2026 | 22,252 GT | Sold to Arab Bridge Maritime in 2026 as Nefertiti |
