= MV Rosalind Franklin =

French ferry operated by Brittany Ferries

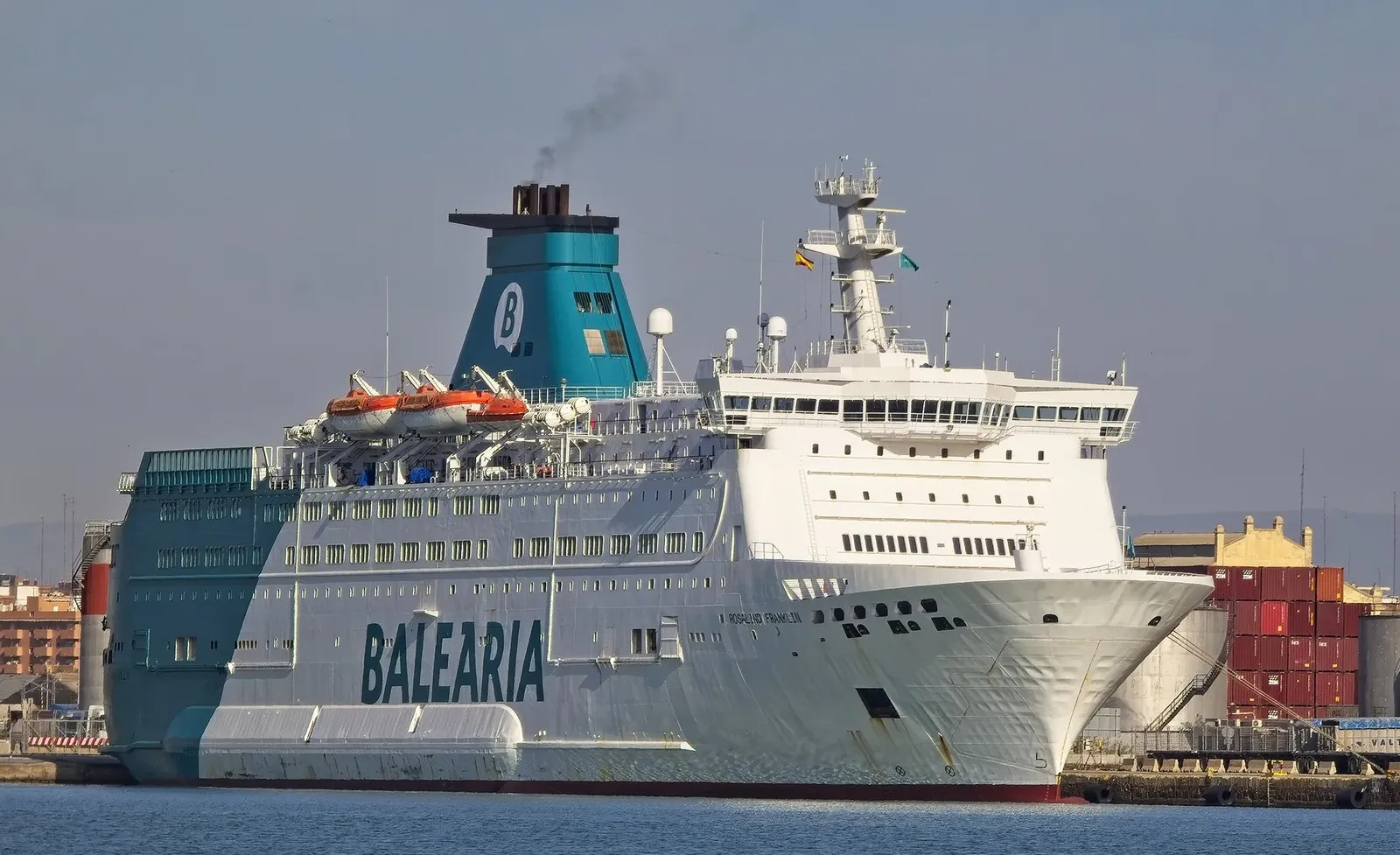
- Rosalind Franklin in Valencia

History
- Name: 1989-2025: Bretagne; 2025-present: Rosalind Franklin
- Owner: 1989-2025: SABEMEN; 2025-present: Baleària
- Operator: 1989-2025: Brittany Ferries; 2025-present: Baleària
- Port of registry: Limassol, Cyprus
- Ordered: 1986
- Builder: Chantiers de l'Atlantique, Saint-Nazaire, France
- Cost: £55 million
- Yard number: D29
- Launched: 4 February 1989
- Christened: 12th July 1989
- Completed: 1989
- Maiden voyage: 16 July 1989
- In service: 16 July 1989
- Identification: IMO number: 8707329
- Status: Operational

General characteristics
- Tonnage: 24,534 GT
- Length: 151.2 m (496.1 ft) 152.2 m (499.3 ft) (With Ducktail)
- Beam: 26 m (85.3 ft) 27.8 m (91.2 ft) (With Sponsons)
- Height: 41 m (134.5 ft)
- Decks: 10
- Installed power: Four 12-cyl Wärtsilä-Crepelle medium speed diesel engines, 5,950bhp each
- Propulsion: 2 Variable pitch propellers
- Speed: 20.5 knots (38.0 km/h; 23.6 mph) cruising, 25 knots (46 km/h; 29 mph) max
- Capacity: 2,056 passengers; 580 vehicles
- Crew: 134

MV Rosalind Franklin is a ferry that was operated by Brittany Ferries as the Bretagne. She was built at Chantiers de l'Atlantique shipyard in Saint-Nazaire, France. She was the company's first purpose-built ship, and sailed for Brittany Ferries for 35 years from 1989 until 2024. She was the company's flagship until the arrival of MV Val de Loire in 1993. On 5 March 2025 it was announced that Baleària had purchased the ship for an undisclosed amount.

== History ==
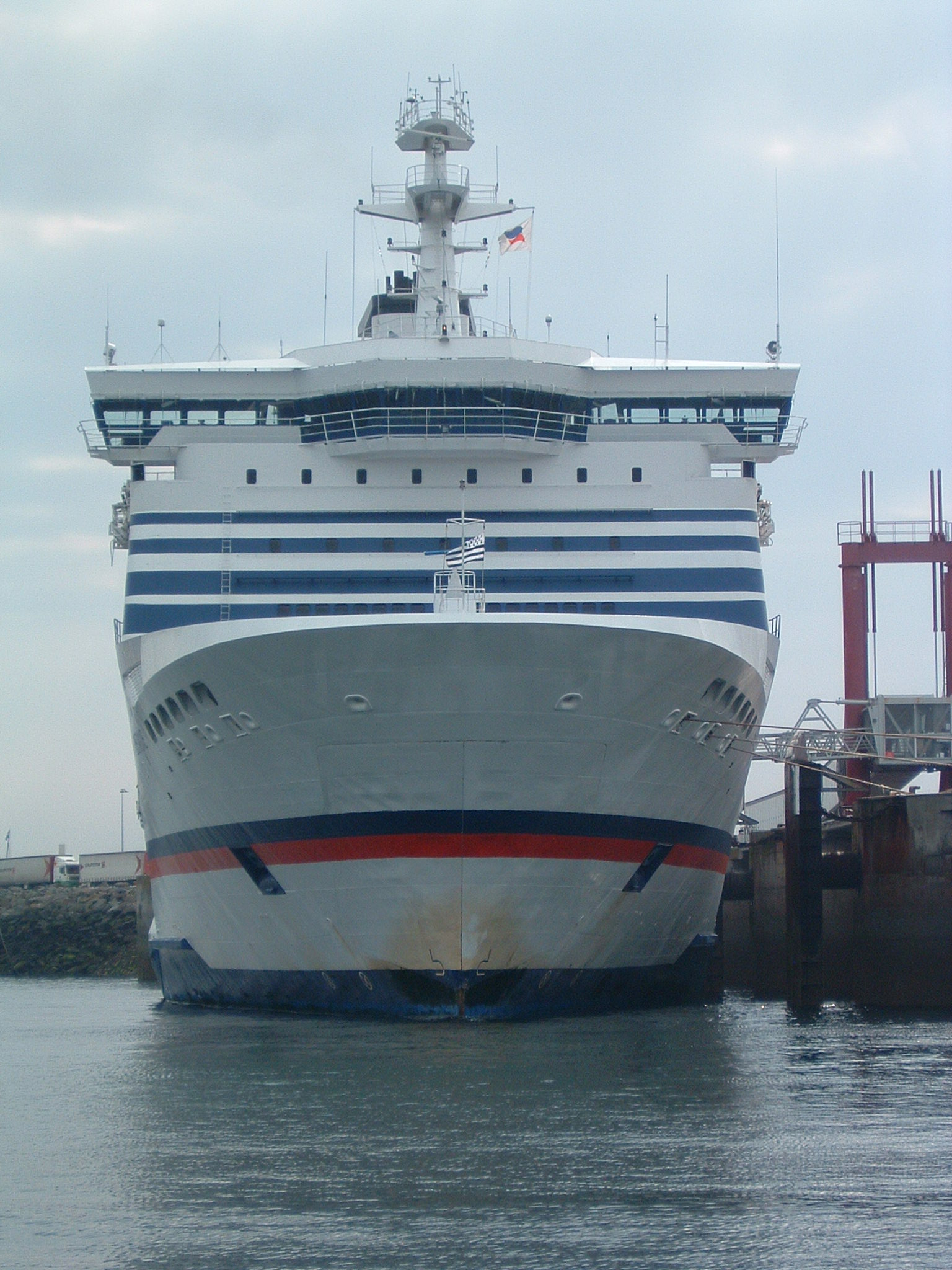
Bretagne in January 2022

Bretagne was ordered by Brittany Ferries in the late 1980s in order to increase capacity on the Plymouth to Santander, Plymouth to Roscoff and Roscoff to Cork routes. The ship set a new standard in on-board facilities for the company and was one of the first true cruise-ferries on the English Channel. Built by Chantiers de l'Atlantique, Bretagne was launched on 4 February 1989 and entered service on 16 July the same year. Bretagne's interior was furnished in typical 'Breton' decor featuring original artwork by the Scottish painter Alexander Goudie.

Following the commissioning of the Val de Loire in 1993 the ship was transferred to the Portsmouth to Saint-Malo route, which she would predominantly serve until her withdrawal in 2024.

Bretagne was used on the Cherbourg to Poole route from 26 February to 10 March 2007. She then became the only current passenger vessel in the Brittany Ferries fleet to have visited every port served by the company and to have operated on all the current routes. It was originally planned that she would return to Poole in January 2008 to cover for the absence of the Cotentin. In addition to sailing from Cherbourg alongside the Barfleur she would also have sailed between Poole and Santander at the weekend, departing Poole on Friday night and arriving back on Monday morning. This plan was dropped shortly after the publication of the 2008 timetable, and Bretagne instead covered for the refit on the Mont St Michel on the Ouistreham to Portsmouth route.

In early 2009 Bretagne underwent a £5 million refit. The work included creation of 50 "Club 4", cabins along with refurbishment of the rest of the ship's cabins, refurbishment of the self-service restaurant, refit of the "La Gerbe de Locronan Salon de Thé" to create a WiFi cafe area and rebuilding of the reclining seat lounges to create new lounge areas for business, reading and watching television.

On 20 July 2021, Brittany Ferries announced at a press conference in Paris that they had secured a charter with Stena RoRo for 2 more E-Flexers. Bretagne was replaced by one of these new vessels, Saint-Malo, on the Portsmouth to Saint-Malo service. Saint Malo was delivered in 2024 and entered service in 2025. The other vessel replaced Normandie on the Ouistreham (Caen) to Portsmouth service.

Bretagne was retired in November 2024 and was sold to Baleària and left Le Havre on 18 March 2025 for further service in the Mediterranean. Her new owners renamed her Rosalind Franklin after the scientist.

== Routes ==
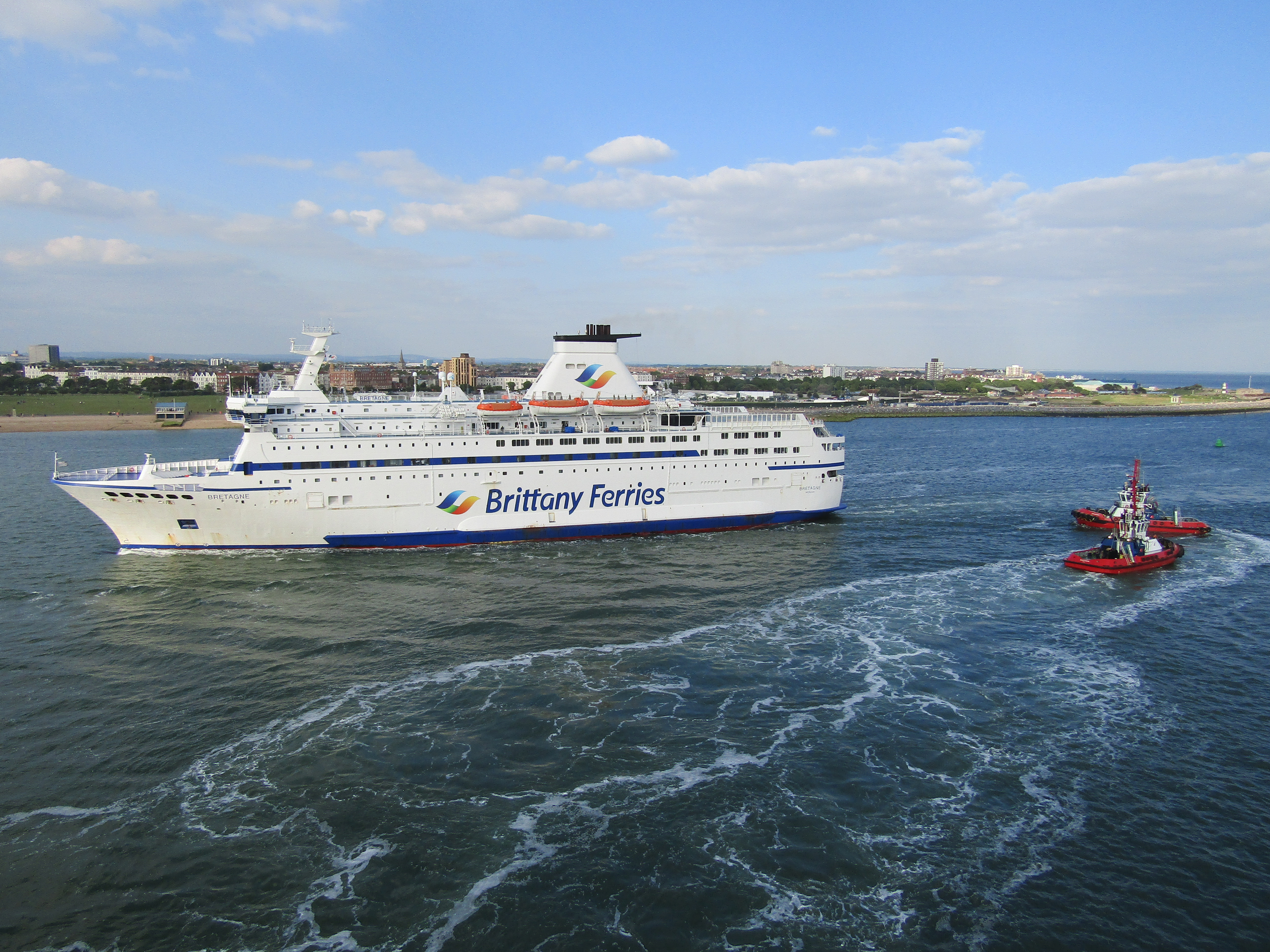
Bretagne entering Portsmouth Harbour in 2024

The ship was designed for the Plymouth to Santander, Plymouth to Roscoff and Roscoff to Cork routes.

From 1993 until 2024 the Bretagne served the Saint-Malo to Portsmouth route daily but has also seen use on the Ouistreham-Portsmouth and Cherbourg-Poole lines as refit cover and also the winter only route between Saint-Malo and Plymouth.
