= MV Armorique (2008) =

French ferry

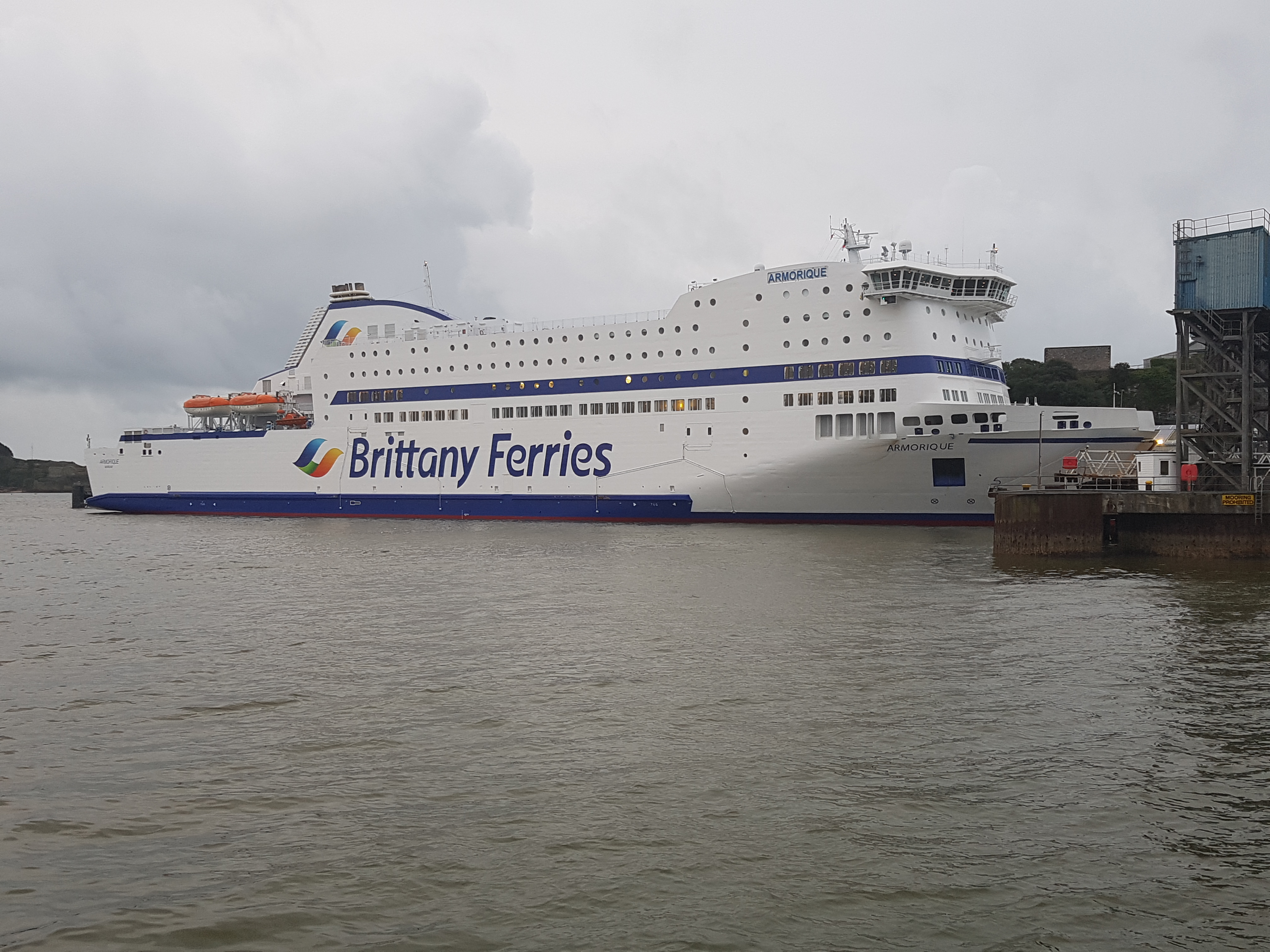
- MV Armorique berthed at Plymouth

History
- Name: Armorique
- Owner: 2009–2020: SOMAROP; 2020-present: Brittany Ferries
- Operator: Brittany Ferries
- Port of registry: Morlaix, France
- Route: Plymouth - Roscoff
- Ordered: January 2006
- Builder: STX Europe Helsinki Shipyard, Finland
- Cost: £81 million (€110 million)
- Yard number: 1362
- Laid down: 14 March 2008
- Launched: 10 August 2008
- Completed: 28 January 2009
- Maiden voyage: 10 February 2009
- Identification: IMO number: 9364980; Call Sign: FMLW
- Status: In service

General characteristics
- Tonnage: 29,468 GT
- Length: 168 m (551 ft 2 in)
- Beam: 26.8 m (87 ft 11 in)
- Speed: 25 kn (46 km/h)
- Capacity: 1,500 passengers; 470 cars; 65 freight vehicles

MV Armorique is a passenger and freight ferry built for Brittany Ferries by STX Europe in Finland at a cost of £81 million (€110 million). The vessel was delivered to Brittany Ferries on 26 January 2009, it was originally planned for her to be delivered in September 2008. Armorique is named after a national park in western Brittany. Armorique was also the name of a previous Brittany Ferries vessel purchased for service between Portsmouth and St Malo in 1975 and sold in 1993.

The vessel was designed and built specifically for the Plymouth-Roscoff route, as a replacement for the Pont L'Abbe. Her maiden voyage was due to be on 10 February 2009 at 15:00hrs, sailing from Roscoff to Plymouth. However, due to severe weather conditions, this crossing was cancelled, and she sailed to Plymouth without passengers. The overnight crossing from Plymouth on 10 February went ahead, making this her maiden voyage. Armorique sails under the French flag and is registered in Morlaix.

== Routes ==
=== Current route ===
- Plymouth - Roscoff

=== Other routes served ===
- Portsmouth - Bilbao
- Portsmouth - Santander
- Portsmouth - Saint Malo
- Portsmouth - Caen
- Plymouth - Santander
- Poole - Cherbourg
- Roscoff - Cork
- Portsmouth to Le Havre
- Rosslare - Saint Malo Freight Only

Armorique is the only ship to have visited all the ports operated by Brittany Ferries.

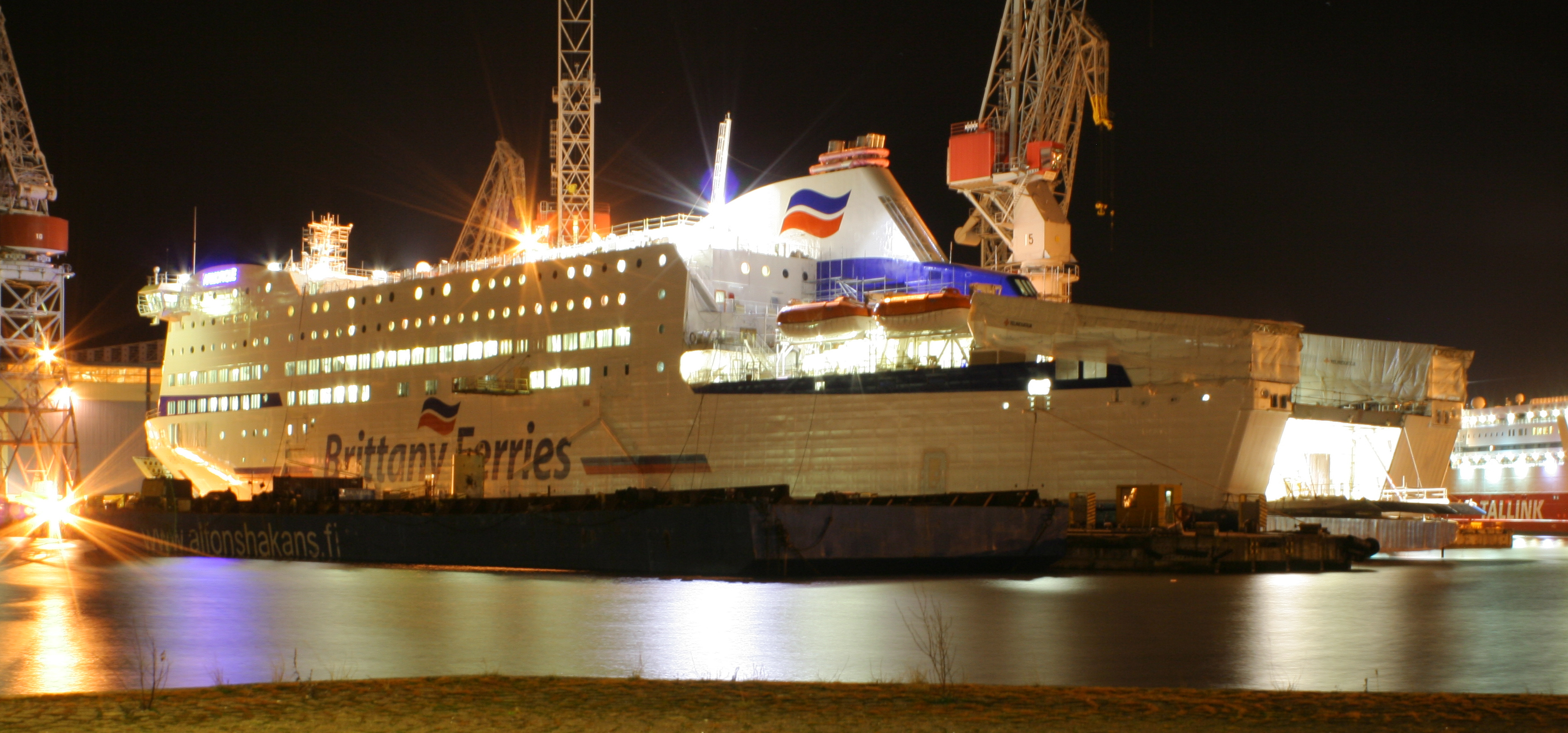
MV Armorique under construction - 2008

== Design ==
Armorique is identical to Cotentin from keel to deck five. The first deck of passenger space is on deck six rather than deck 7 as on the Cotentin.

Initial artist impressions from Aker Yards showed a vessel that shared a number of similarities to the Cotentin. However, Brittany Ferries released an altered artist's impression of the Armorique in December. Revisions include a design change to the funnel and upper cabin deck along with alterations to the proposed livery.

Pictures released by Brittany Ferries show the ship will have double deck vehicle access at the bow and stern to decks 3 and 5 though while on her usual route loading of deck 5 will be via an internal ramp due to lack of double deck facilities at Plymouth or Roscoff. The stern door will be narrower than the one fitted to the Cotentin.
