= Moby Corse =

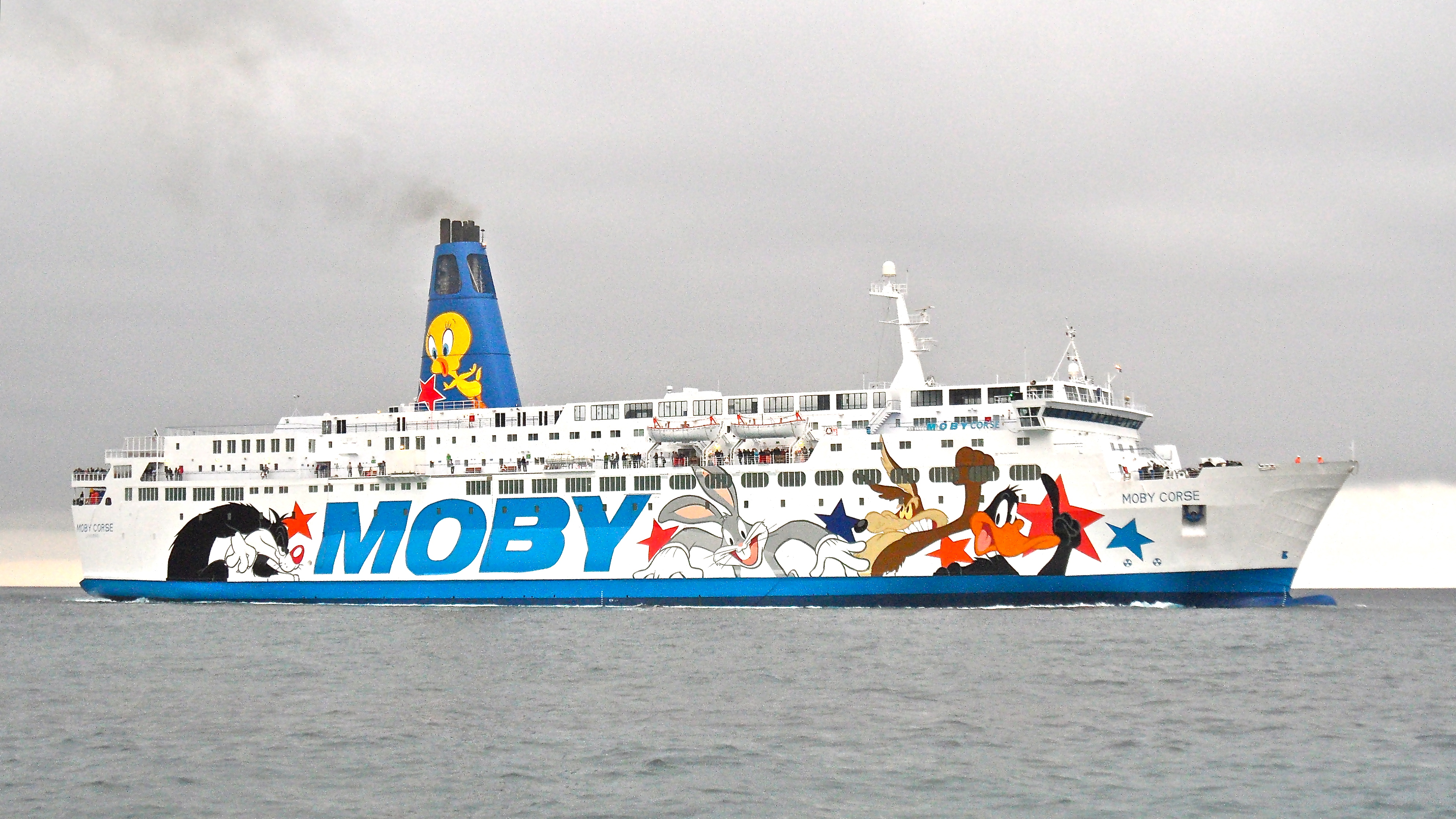
- MV Santa Cruz

History
- Name: 1978–2002: Dana Anglia; 2002–2006: Duke of Scandinavia; 2006–2009: Pont L'Abbé; 2009—2024: Moby Corse; 2024-Present: Santa Cruz
- Owner: 1978–2007: DFDS Seaways; 2007–2009: Brittany Ferries; 2009—present: Moby Lines
- Operator: 1978–1987: DFDS Seaways; 1987: Sealink British Ferries; 1987–2006: DFDS Seaways; 2006–2009: Brittany Ferries; 2009—present: Moby Lines
- Port of registry: 1978–2002: Esbjerg, Denmark; 2002–2006: Copenhagen, Denmark; 2006–2009: Morlaix, France; 2009—present: Livorno, Italy
- Ordered: 25 May 1975
- Builder: Aalborg Værft, Ålborg, Denmark
- Yard number: 210
- Laid down: 21 May 1976
- Launched: 21 June 1977
- Christened: 4 May 1978
- Acquired: 28 April 1978
- In service: 13 May 1978
- Identification: IMO number: 7615414
- Status: In Service

General characteristics (as built)
- Tonnage: 14,399 GRT; 3,440 tonnes deadweight (DWT)
- Length: 152.91 m (501 ft 8 in)
- Beam: 24.19 m (79 ft 4 in)
- Draught: 7.51 m (24 ft 8 in)
- Installed power: 2 × Lindholmen-Pielstick 18 PC2-5 diesels; 15445 kW
- Speed: 21 kn (39 km/h)
- Capacity: 1,370 passengers; 1,249 passenger berths; 470 cars; 810 lanemeters

General characteristics (after 1993 & 2000 refits)
- Tonnage: 18,321 GT
- Length: 152.91 m (501 ft 8 in)
- Beam: 26.26 m (86 ft 2 in)
- Draught: 6.10 m (20 ft 0 in)
- Speed: 19.5 kn (36.1 km/h) (service speed)
- Capacity: 1,120 passengers; 400 cars
- Crew: 120

Moby Corse is a ferry owned and operated by Moby Lines. She was built at Aalborg Værft A/S in Denmark for DFDS Seaways as MV Dana Anglia and entered service with them in 1978. She sailed between Esbjerg, Denmark and Harwich, United Kingdom between 1978 and 2002 before being renamed MV Duke of Scandinavia for service between Copenhagen, Denmark and Gdańsk, Poland. She returned to the North Sea in 2003 to sail between Newcastle and IJmuiden.

In 2006 she was chartered by Brittany Ferries to replace the MV Val de Loire, renamed MV Pont L'Abbé. It was announced on 19 December 2007 that the vessel was sold to Brittany Ferries. Her final sailing between Plymouth and Roscoff was on 9 November 2008, after which she was laid up in Saint-Nazaire. In October 2009, the ship was sold to Moby Lines. She was renamed Moby Corse and started the new service from Toulon to Bastia on 1 April 2010. On 1 October it was reported she had been sold to Ferry Med SRL and is to be renamed Santa Cruz.

== Regular routes ==
- Plymouth-Roscoff April 2006 – November 2008
- Portsmouth-Cherbourg March 2006

== Other routes served ==
Under Brittany Ferries, Pont L'Abbé has only sailed in passenger service on the Plymouth-Roscoff and Portsmouth-Cherbourg routes. She also sailed between Plymouth and St Malo in December 2006.

== Media appearances ==
While registered as Dana Anglia the vessel appeared in several BBC TV Series. In 1981, A ship named Dana Anglia appeared in the BBC TV movie Artemis 81. In 1982-3 she was the setting for the second and third series of the soap opera Triangle. The ship in the first series was Tor Scandinavia.

It featured in the 1989 Christmas episode, 'Sailing' of the comedy series Birds of a Feather.

In July 2005 in Series 6, Episode 6 of the BBC TV show "Top Gear", the vessel appeared in the background of a shot taken in Newcastle during the Race to Oslo challenge.
