= MV Mont St Michel =

French ferry

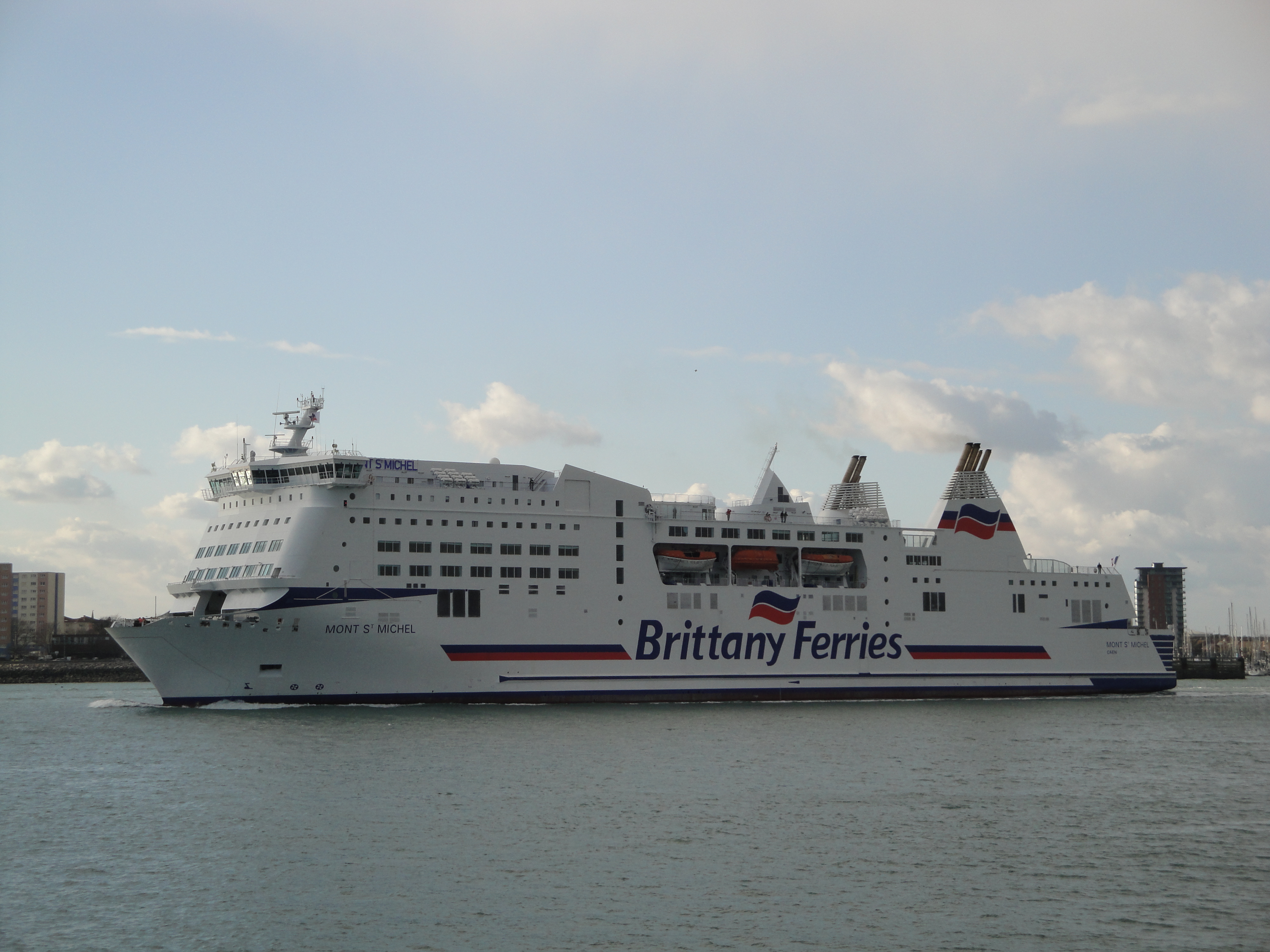

History
- Name: Mont St Michel
- Owner: 2002–2020: SOMACAL; 2020–present: Brittany Ferries
- Operator: Brittany Ferries
- Port of registry: Caen, France
- Route: Portsmouth-Caen (Ouistreham)
- Ordered: September 2000
- Builder: Van der Giessen de Noord
- Cost: £80 million
- Laid down: March 2001
- Launched: 15 March 2002
- Completed: 2002
- Maiden voyage: 20 December 2002
- In service: 20 December 2002
- Identification: IMO number: 9238337; MMSI number: 227023100; Callsign: FNMT
- Status: In Service

General characteristics
- Class & type: Ferry
- Tonnage: 35,592 GT
- Length: 173 m (567 ft 7 in)
- Beam: 28.5 m (93 ft 6 in)
- Draught: 6.21 m (20 ft 4 in)
- Ice class: 1D
- Installed power: Krupp MAK
- Speed: 22 kn (41 km/h)
- Capacity: 2,123 passengers; 830 vehicles
- Crew: 135

Mont St Michel is a ferry operated by Brittany Ferries. The vessel was built at Van der Giessen de Noord shipyard in the Netherlands and has been sailing for Brittany Ferries since 2002. Mont St Michel was to be named Deauville or Honfleur but this was thought to be too similar to Barfleur. Early artist impressions of the ship carried the name Normandie 2. The internal layout of Mont St Michel is based on the Normandie, which used to operate on the Portsmouth–Caen (Ouistreham) route.

Construction started on 7 June 2001 and she was launched on 15 March 2002. Major delays in fitting out meant that the ship was not delivered until December 2002, over five months behind schedule. In place of Mont St Michel, the smaller Quiberon was kept in the fleet throughout the busy 2002 summer season, assisted by Purbeck.

Mont St Michel sails under the French flag and is registered in Caen.

== Routes served ==
- Portsmouth–Caen (Ouistreham) 2002–present
