= MV Sveti Stefan =

Car ferry

History
- Name: 1977–1989: Cornouailles; 1989–2000: Havelet; 2000–2013: Sveti Stefan
- Owner: 1977–1990:Brittany Ferries; 1990–1998: British Channel Island Ferries; 1998–2000: Condor Ferries; 2000–2013: Fortune Overseas Navigation
- Operator: 1977–1984: Brittany Ferries; 1984–1986: Sealink; 1986–1989: Truckline Ferries; 1989–1994: British Channel Island Ferries; 1994–2000: Condor Ferries; 2000–2013: Montenegro Lines
- Builder: Trondhjems mekaniske Værksted
- Yard number: 735
- Launched: 20 June 1976
- Completed: 9 May 1977
- In service: 24 May 1977
- Out of service: 18 April 2013
- Identification: IMO number: 7527899
- Fate: Scrapped at Aliağa Ship Breaking Yard in 2013

General characteristics
- Tonnage: 6,918 GT
- Length: 110 m (360 ft)
- Beam: 17 m (56 ft)
- Draft: 5.182 m (17.00 ft)
- Installed power: 2 x SEMT Pielstick 16PA6V280; 8,355 kW (combined)
- Speed: 19.5 knots (36.1 km/h; 22.4 mph)
- Capacity: 550 passengers; 205 cars; 40 trailers

MV Sveti Stefan was a roll-on/roll-off ferry last operated by Montenegro Lines. She was built in 1977 by Trondhjems mekaniske Værksted, Trondheim, Norway, and first entered service as MS Cornouailles for Brittany Ferries. She also served under the name MS Havelet.

== Concept and Construction ==
Brittany Ferries had launched their first ferry service (as Armemant Bretagne-Angleterre-Irlande (BAI)) on 1st January 1973 between Roscoff and Plymouth using the freight ferry Kerisnel. A passenger only service using the chartered Poseidon also launched in 1973, demonstrating demand for such a service, which was launched in 1974. The company expanded to run services to St Malo, initially from Plymouth in 1975, moving to the newly opened ferry port at Portsmouth in 1976.

By 1976, the firm was now running a two route, three ship operation and confidence was such that they ordered what became Cornouailles to operate on the Roscoff to Plymouth route, which at the time was further increasing in popularity.

== Service ==
=== 1977-1984: Brittany Ferries ===
She entered service with Brittany Ferries on 24 May 1977, arriving in Roscoff where she was prevented from docking by a blockade of French fishermen, returning to Plymouth until the situation was resolved and normal service commenced three days later.

During the latter part of 1979, she switched to cover the autumn service between Roscoff and Cork, although she later returned to her original route. After announcing a £1 million loss in 1980, Brittany Ferries slipped to a further projected loss of £2.4 million for 1981. As a result a rescue package was put together by the French government and Breton banks which created a new holding company, Société Anonyme Bretonne d'Économie Mixte d'Équipement Naval (SABEMEN), who took ownership of Cornouailles along with her sisters Armorique and Prince of Brittany.

In 1984 Brittany chartered the Danish ship Gelting Nord which they renamed Benodet and placed on the Roscoff - Plymouth route in place of Cornouailles, which was now surplus to requirements.

=== 1984-1986: Sealink ===
By late 1981, the Sealink Newhaven-Dieppe ferry service run by British Rail and SNCF was making a significant loss overall. Despite the presence on the route of profit generating British ship Senlac, the two French ships on the route (Villandry and Valencay) were considerably smaller, built in the 1960s and required major improvements. The English partners therefore were keen for the French ships to be replaced and a more balanced revenue-sharing agreement, revised from the existing two thirds/one third arrangement favouring the French,ideally on a equal share basis. After announcing a strike-inducing withdrawal in January 1982, agreement was reached to retain the service a few weeks later.

Following sustained losses on the route for 1983, new owners of Sealink British Ferries; Sea Containers formally announced their intention in June 1984 to withdraw from the route, leaving it solely to the French operator from 1985. SNCF had recently chartered Cornouailles from Brittany Ferries for two years to operate between Newhaven and Dieppe, replacing Villandry and Valencay to improve tonnage on the route.

In October 1984 Cornouailles collided with the eastern pier at Newhaven and had to be taken out of service for a period to replace bow visor damage.

=== 1986-1989: Truckline Ferries ===
Following her time with Sealink she passed into service with Truckline Ferries between 1986 and 1988, where she was used to launch the first passenger ferry service from the Port of Poole. This sailed under the banner of Les Routiers offering a value focused service inspired by the European restaurant grouping of the same name.

The service was a success and was repeated in 1987, before Cornouilles was replaced by a larger ship for 1989. Ironically the replacement ship was the ex-British Channel Island Ferries ferry Corbière which, as Benodet, had displaced Cornouilles from her Roscoff-Plymouth route in 1984.

=== 1989–1994: British Channel Island Ferries ===
Cornouilles and Corbière effectively swapped with the Cornouilles, renamed Havelet, moving into the fleet of British Channel Island Ferries (BCIF), sailing between Poole and the Channel Islands from 10 May 1989.

A 1990 refit saw the Havelet arrested in port in November that year after a dispute over payment. The ship had sailed to Humber Ship Repairers in Hull for a five week long project in April 1990 at a cost of £2 million. This had included in increase in capacity to 550 passengers by adding 120 extra seats, a new sun deck, new restaurant and bar. Humber Ship Repairers collapsed shortly after completion leading to a sub contractor remaining unpaid for a car ramp, despite BCIF having paid the full amount due to Humber. The sub contractor obtained a warrant for the arrest of the ferry from the Admiralty Court leading to it being impounded at Poole for two days.

At this stage BCIF were running a three ship service with Havelet running alongside the popular Rozel and Sylbe, but in late summer 1991 it was announced that the company had not renewed the charter of the Rozel and that she would be replaced by the Reine Mathilde from Brittany Ferries, which was renamed Beauport. Beauport was smaller and less popular than Rozel, one of the factors which contributed to the downfall of BCIF, and by the end of 1993 both Beauport and Sylbe had also left the fleet, leaving Havelet as the only ship. The company planned that the Havelet would be their main passenger ship for the 1994 season, with the Truckline vessel Purbeck being brought as freight ship.

=== 1994-2000: Condor Ferries ===
In January 1994 in was announced that, due to their substantial losses the previous season, British Channel Island Ferries, had been taken over by one of the parent companies of Condor Ferries, Commodore Shipping. Havelet ran a conventional ferry service for Condor from Weymouth from 23 January 1994, on a three year charter.

Havelet was withdrawn from service after making her, then, last sailing for Condor on 29 October 1996. She was then placed in lay-up in Isle of Portland.

In October 1997 the Channel Island governments put the licence to operate ferry services between the Channel Islands and the UK out to tender. After long negotiations, the license was awarded to Condor Ferries with one of the conditions of retaining its service agreement being the need to provide a conventional backup vessel from October 1998. Condor was therefore forced to purchase the Havelet in September 1998 to act as an all-weather back-up until the delivery of a new conventional vessel in 1999.

She re-entered service with Condor in Winter 1998, remaining in service until March 1999. The new conventional ferry Commodore Clipper was delivered on 25 September 1999, replacing Havelet, who left the fleet in 2000 after a period in lay-up in Weymouth.

=== 2000-2013: Montenegro Lines ===
She was sold in 2000 to Montenegro Lines, where she was renamed Sveti Stefan and sailed between Bari and Bar until April 2013, when she sailed to Aliağa, Turkey to be scrapped.
