= MV Trinity (2007) =

British cargo ship

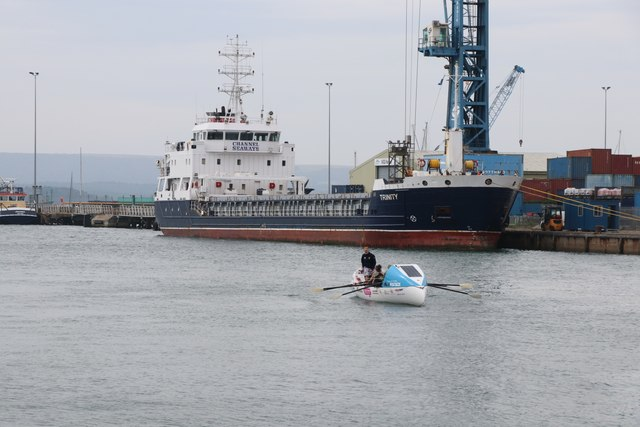
- Trinity in Poole Harbour in 2024

History

United Kingdom
- Name: MV Trinity
- Owner: GY9 Ltd
- Operator: Faversham Ships Ltd
- Builder: Karadeniz Shipyard, Turkey
- Laid down: 1 June 2006
- Launched: 3 March 2007
- Completed: 14 November 2007
- In service: 2007–present)
- Home port: Poole, United Kingdom
- Identification: IMO: 9396452; MMSI: 232027317; Call sign: MHFE8
- Status: Active

General characteristics
- Type: General cargo ship
- Tonnage: 2,130 GT, 3,020 DWT
- Length: 80.45 m (263.9 ft)
- Beam: 12.50 m (41.0 ft)
- Draught: 5.30 m (17.4 ft)
- Depth: 6.50 m (21.3 ft)
- Decks: 1
- Installed power: 1 × Caterpillar-MaK 6M25 diesel engine; 1,140 kW (1,529 hp)
- Propulsion: Single screw
- Speed: 11 kn (20 km/h; 13 mph) (Service)
- Capacity: 130,593 cbft (Grain/Bale)

MV Trinity is a British-flagged general cargo ship built in 2007. Currently operated by Faversham Ships Ltd, she serves as a critical logistics link between Poole Harbour and the Channel Islands. In 2015, while operating in the Black Sea, she survived an engine room fire after one of the diesel generators inflamed, with no casualties.

== Construction and early career ==
MV Trinity was constructed at Karadeniz Shipyard in Ünye, Turkey. Her keel was laid on 1 June 2006 and she was launched as the Nazim Bey on 3 March 2007. She was completed and delivered to her owners in Istanbul on 14 November 2007.

She operated in the Mediterranean and Black Seas under the Turkish flag. She was managed by various ship comapanies, including Yardimci Shipping.

=== Incidents ===
On 30 November 2015 the vessel suffered a mechanical failure after a generator fire broke out in the engine room while she was in the Black Sea, going to Constanta from Tuzla. Her crew were able to put out the fire and she was eventually towed, returning to service shortly after.

On 5 October 2019, she suffered an engine failure off Sile and her crew were unable to repair her. She was again towed back to Tuzla and was repaired to reenter service a few days later.

== Renaming and later career ==
In March 2020 she was bought by GY9 Ltd and renamed Trinity, re-registered under the flag of the United Kingdom and operated by Faversham Ships Ltd. She began to transport goods from Poole Harbour to the Channel Islands.

== See Also ==
- General cargo ship
