= MV St Edmund =

Former British Rail North Sea Ferry

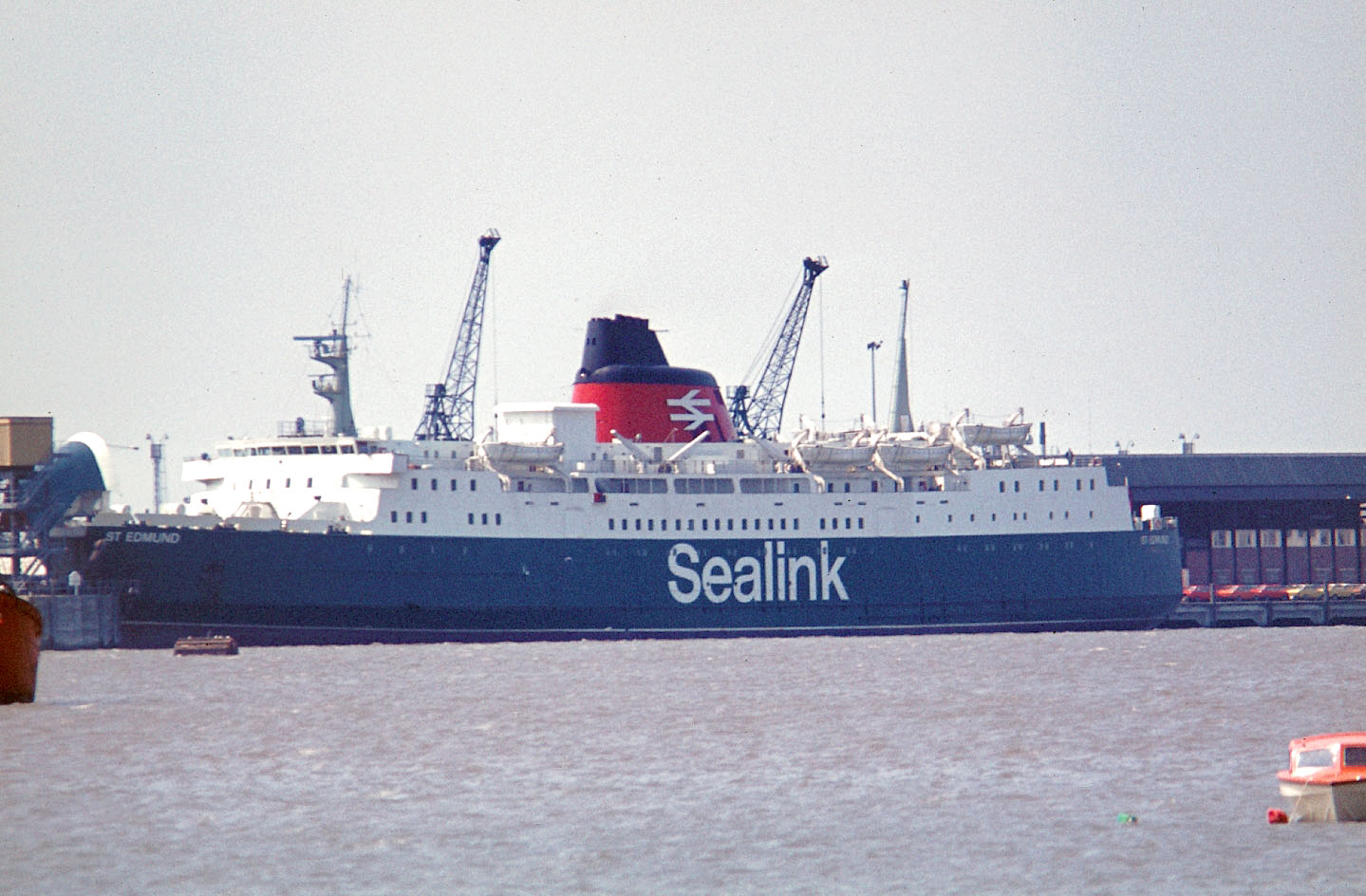
- St Edmund at Parkeston Quay, 1975

History
- Name: 1973-1983: St Edmund; 1983: HMS Keren; 1983-1986: Keren; 1986-1989: Scirocco; 1989-1992: Rozel; 1992-2004: Scirocco; 2004-2006: Santa Catharine I; 2006-2009: Sara 3
- Operator: 1973-1983: Sealink; 1983-1986: Royal Navy; 1986-1989: Cenargo Group; 1989-1992: British Channel Island Ferries; 1992-2004: Ferrimaroc; 2004-2008: El Salam Maritime; 2008-2009: Arab Ship Management Ltd
- Builder: Cammell Laird Shipbuilders Ltd., Birkenhead
- Launched: 14 November 1973
- Christened: 14 November 1973
- In service: 19 January 1975
- Out of service: 2009
- Fate: Scrapped

General characteristics
- Tonnage: 8,987 gross register tons (GRT)
- Length: 131.06 m (430.0 ft)
- Draught: 5.18 m (17.0 ft)
- Depth: 12.8 m (42 ft)
- Decks: 7.6 m (25 ft)
- Installed power: 20,400 shp
- Speed: 21 kn (24 mph; 39 km/h)
- Capacity: Main deck: 1,400 passengers, 140 cars or 40 m × 30 m (131 ft × 98 ft) road haulage vehicles; Gallery deck: 148 cars

St Edmund was a turbine screw car ferry built for British Rail (BR) in the early 1970s. She saw service during the Falklands War and was later used in the Mediterranean.

== British Rail service ==
St Edmund was christened on 14 November 1973 by Caroline Marsh, wife of the then British Railways Board Director Richard Marsh, and launched at Cammell Laird in Birkenhead. She was due to be launched the previous day, but due to bad weather the ceremony was postponed.

St Edmund underwent sea trials after completetion and in December 1974, she was brought into BR service at Parkeston Quay in Harwich by BR's subsidiary Passtruck (Shipping) Co. Ltd. of London, under the Sealink brand, on the Harwich to Hook of Holland route. She operated on this route until May 1982 when she was requisitioned by the Ministry of Defence.

== Ministry of Defence service ==
On 12 May 1982, just over a month after the start of the Falklands War, St Edmund was requisitioned for use by the Royal Navy. Between 13 and 19 May, St Edmund was modified at HMNB Devonport, becoming a troopship. An embarked Naval Party 2060 (NP2060) were drafted to the vessel. She had two helipads, a satellite communications system, two freshwater generating plants and replenishment-at-sea gear fitted.

On 20 May, St Edmund, set sail from Devonport for the Falkland Islands with 5th Brigade troops along with some members of the Royal Air Force. On 30 June, St Edmund transported Argentine Prisoners of War to Puerto Madryn. Upon return to the Falklands, St Edmund was used to ferry troops between the Falklands and Ascension Island. She later became an accommodation ship at Port Stanley. On 17 July, St Edmund transported 9 Parachute Squadron RE to Ascension. St Edmund returned to the UK and was based at HMS Calliope on the Tyne in Gateshead. On 28 January 1983, the MoD compulsorily purchased St Edmund from British Rail.

On Good Friday 1983, St Edmund was commissioned formally into the Royal Navy as HMS Keren with a crew of 35. The RN crew then set about learning the ship ready to take her back to the Falklands. However, a few weeks later, HMS Keren was decommissioned and became MV Keren.

In May 1983, Keren sailed for the Falklands and was used as a floating landing stage. With the addition of extra refrigerated storage in the car decks and a new water osmosis plant, Keren could accommodate approximately 1000 troops. In July 1985, Keren returned to the UK and, after a government funded refit at Vosper Thornycroft in Southampton, she was laid up near Portsmouth for sale.

== Later service ==
In January 1986, Keren was sold to the Cenargo Group who operated the Ferrimaroc service between Almeria in Spain and Nador in Morocco. At this point the ship was renamed Scirroco. Between 18 June and 16 September 1986, the ship was chartered to Tirrenia di Navigazione in Italy to operate between Genoa and Sardinia, later changing to the Genoa to Alicante route. In 1987, she was chartered to Comanav and then Cia. Transmediterranea for Barcelona to Palma route and then in 1988 she moved to the La Goulette to Marseilles route.

On 8 January 1989, she arrived at Southampton where she was refurbished. By February the ship had been chartered by British Channel Island Ferries, operating from Poole to Guernsey and Jersey as the Rozel. In January 1992, she returned to Transmediterranea and reverted to the name Scirroco where she operated the Málaga to Melilla route. On 16 May 1993, she returned to Ferrimaroc's Almeria to Nador route, operating under the Gibraltar flag.

During the summer of 1993, the ship was chartered to Compagnie Marocaine de Navigation (COMANAV) for the Nador to Port-Vendres service. During 1994, she was used on the company's Genoa to Tunis route. On 15 March 1994, the ship returned to Ferrimaroc's Nador - Almeria route, remaining on this route until 2004 when she was sold to El Salam Maritime Transport in Egypt where she was renamed Santa Catharine I. She was chartered to COMANAV returning to the Nador to Port-Vendres route.

In 2005, she was chartered to Algerie Ferries and was used on pilgrim services from Suez. On 30 May 2006, she was renamed Sara 3 and operated on a route between Jeddah and Sawakin. She was sold in June 2009 to Indian breakers for scrapping.
