= MS Barfleur =

Ferry launched in 1991

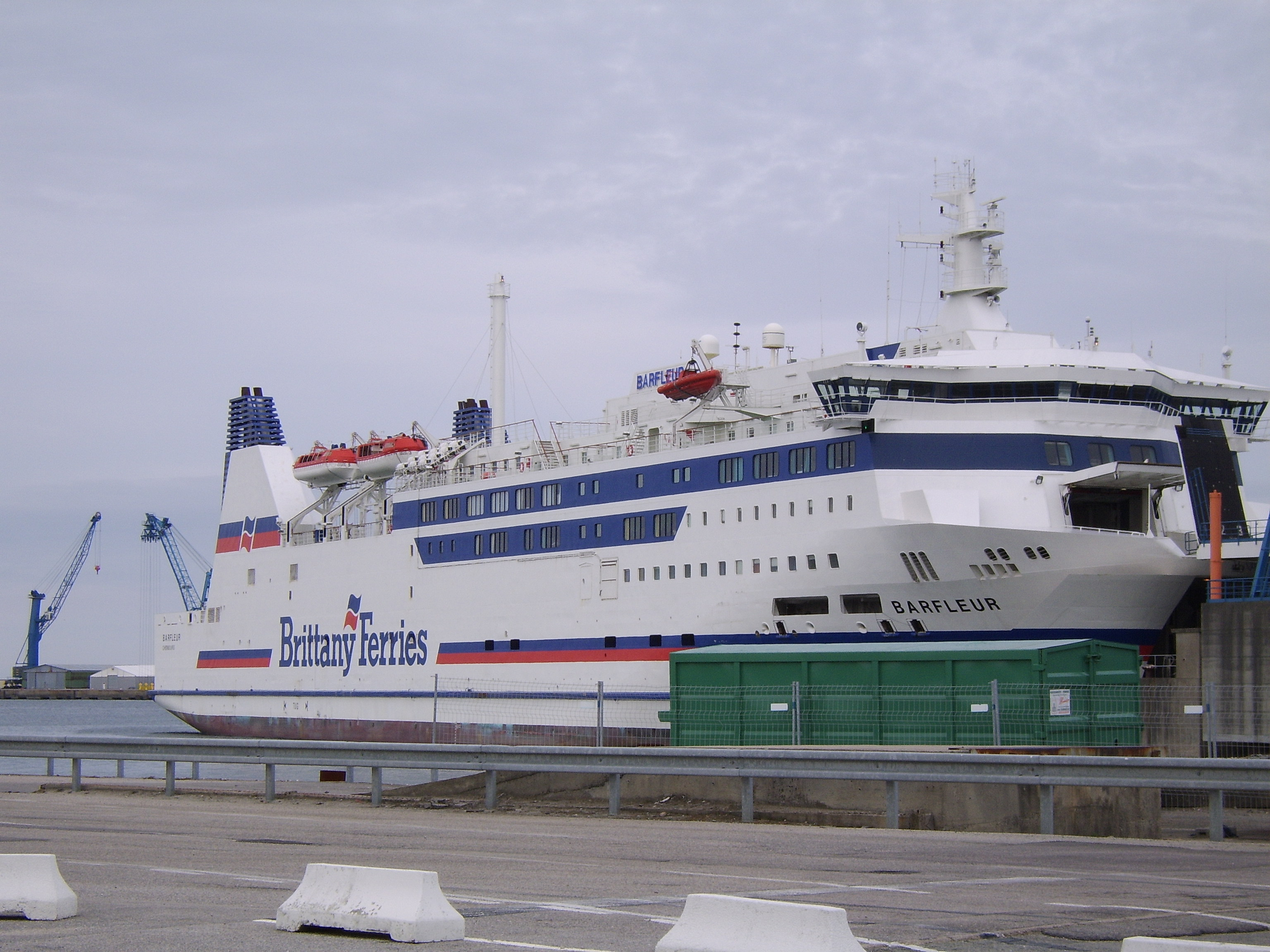
- MS Barfleur at Cherbourg

History
- Name: 1992-2012: Barfleur; 2012: Deal Seaways; 2012-present: Barfleur
- Owner: 1992-2020: SENAMANCHE; 2020-present: Brittany Ferries
- Operator: 1992-1999: Truckline Ferries; 1999-2012: Brittany Ferries; 2012: DFDS Seaways France; 2012-present: Brittany Ferries
- Port of registry: Cherbourg, France
- Route: Poole–Cherbourg
- Ordered: 1990
- Builder: Kværner Masa-Yards Helsinki New Shipyard, Finland
- Yard number: 485
- Launched: 26 July 1991
- Completed: 1992
- In service: 1992
- Identification: IMO number: 9007130

General characteristics
- Tonnage: 20,133 GT
- Length: 158.7 m (520.7 ft)
- Beam: 23.3 m (76.4 ft)
- Installed power: 4 × 8-cyl Wärtsilä Vasa 8R32 diesels, 4,020bhp each geared to two controllable pitch propellers
- Speed: 19.5 knots (36.1 km/h; 22.4 mph)
- Capacity: 1,212 passengers; 590 cars; or; 304 cars and 66 freight vehicles.
- Crew: 185

MS Barfleur is a ferry operated by Brittany Ferries on the Poole–Cherbourg route. Ordered in 1990, she was built by Kværner Masa-Yards in Finland and entered service between Cherbourg and Poole in April 1992. The vessel was originally commissioned for Brittany Ferries' freight subsidiary, Truckline Ferries; in 1999 she began operating as a conventional passenger ferry and was repainted in Brittany Ferries' passenger-fleet colours.

Brittany Ferries lists Barfleur as 158 m (518 ft) long, with a gross tonnage of 20,133 and a service speed of 19.5 kn (36.1 km/h; 22.4 mph). She can carry 1,212 passengers and either 547 cars or 75 lorries.

== Withdrawal and temporary return to service, 2010–2011 ==
On 19 December 2009 Brittany Ferries announced that they would be withdrawing Barfleur from its service between Poole and Cherbourg. They claimed to have been losing money on the service for quite some time. After completing her last trip in February 2010 Barfleur was laid up in the canal near to Caen. For many months there was much speculation as to the future of the vessel with many believing it was to be chartered to another operator. On 16 December 2010, almost a year after the announcement of withdrawal, Brittany Ferries made a statement that Barfleur would resume service on the Poole to Cherbourg route commencing on 27 February 2011. However, the service was to be aimed at freight traffic with proportionately fewer passengers.

On 11 July 2011, Brittany Ferries further announced that Barfleur would again be withdrawn from service between Poole and Cherbourg with effect from 3 October 2011, citing ongoing profitability concerns. The company further commented that the service 'may be reintroduced for the Summer 2012 season'.

It was announced on 10 February 2012 that Barfleur would not resume service in 2012 due to the ongoing difficult economic situation. She would remain laid up at Caen for the foreseeable future.

== Transfer to Dover-Calais under DFDS ==
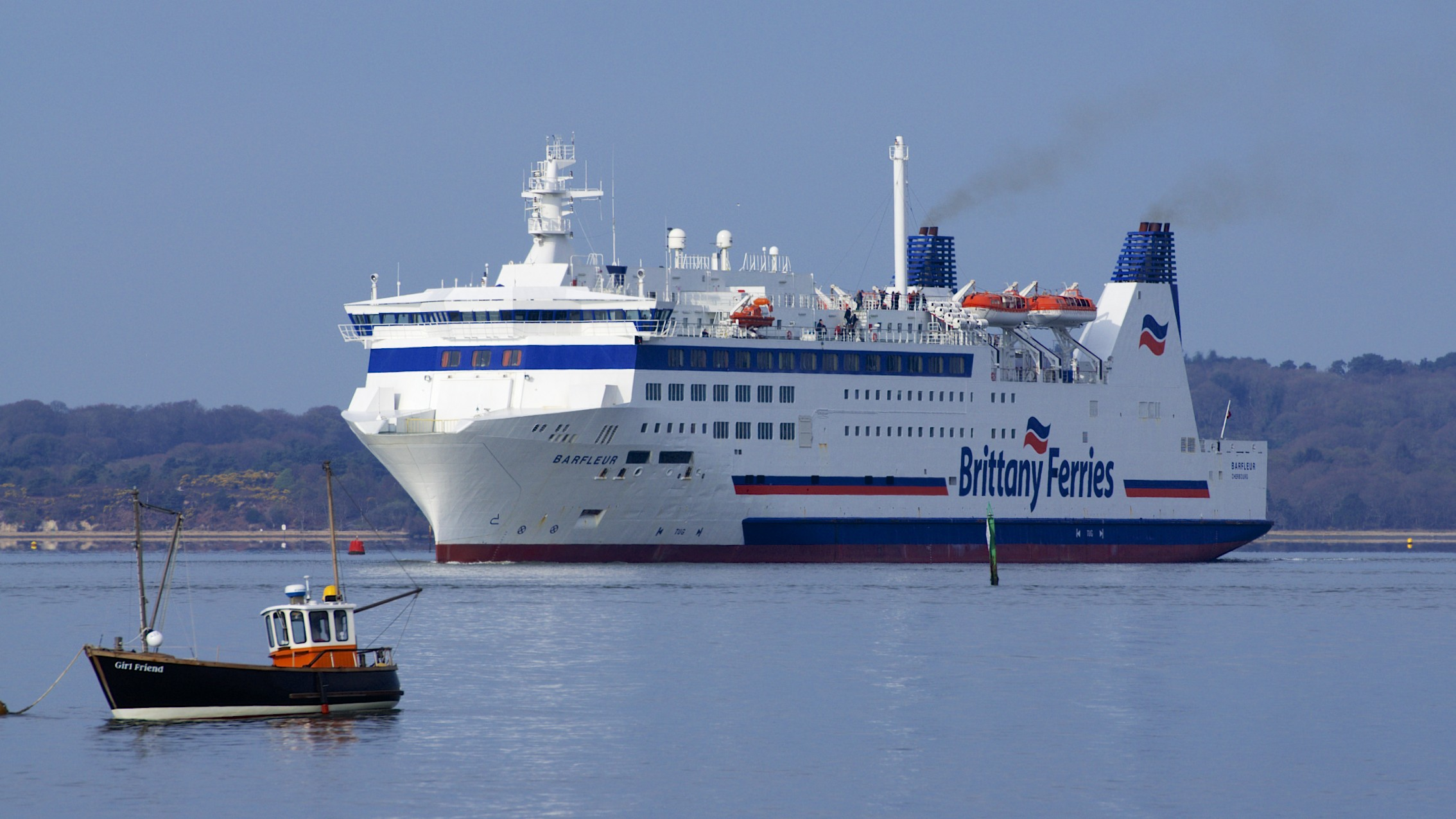
Barfleur leaving Poole in April 2013

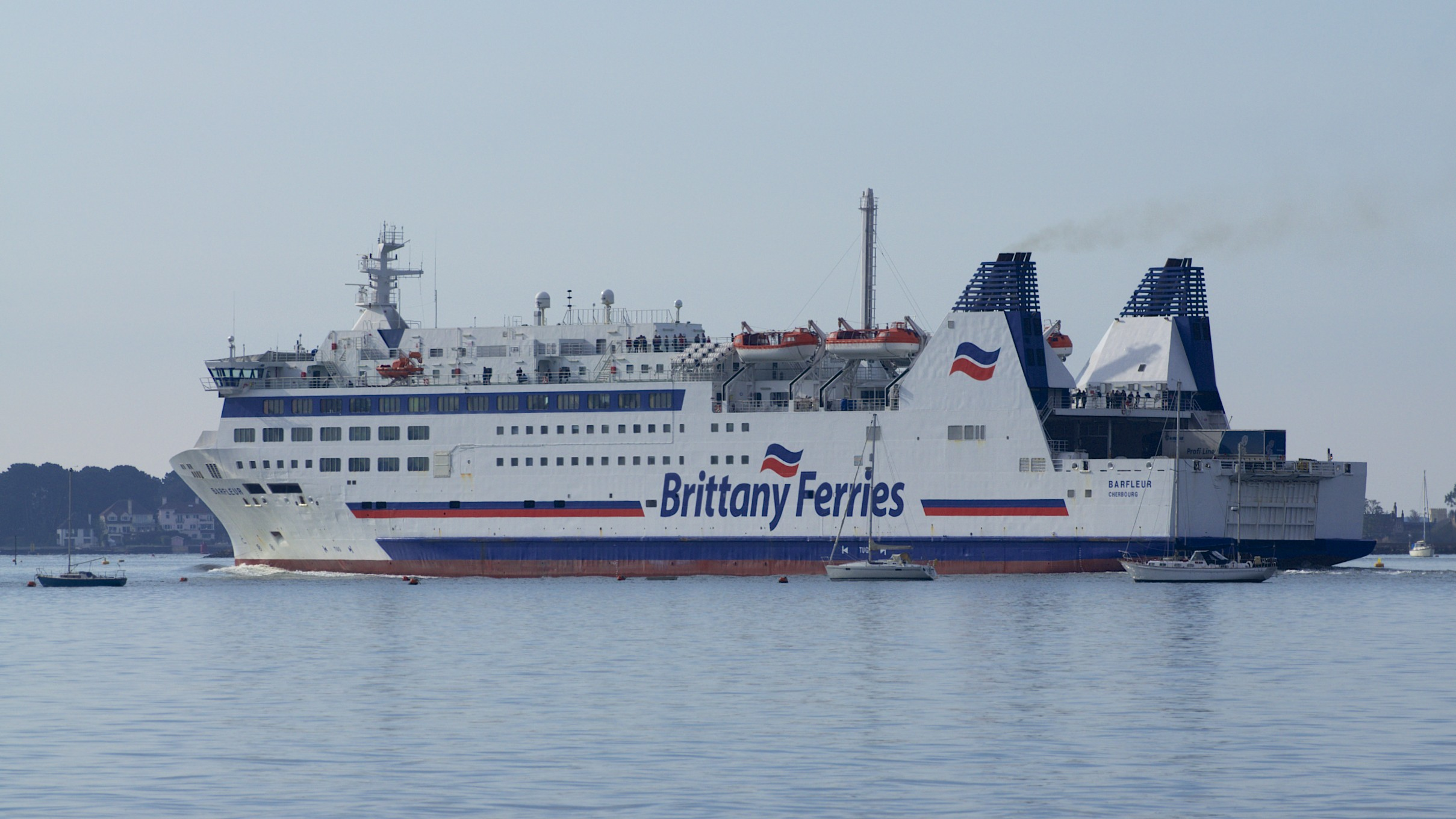
Barfleur leaving Poole in April 2013

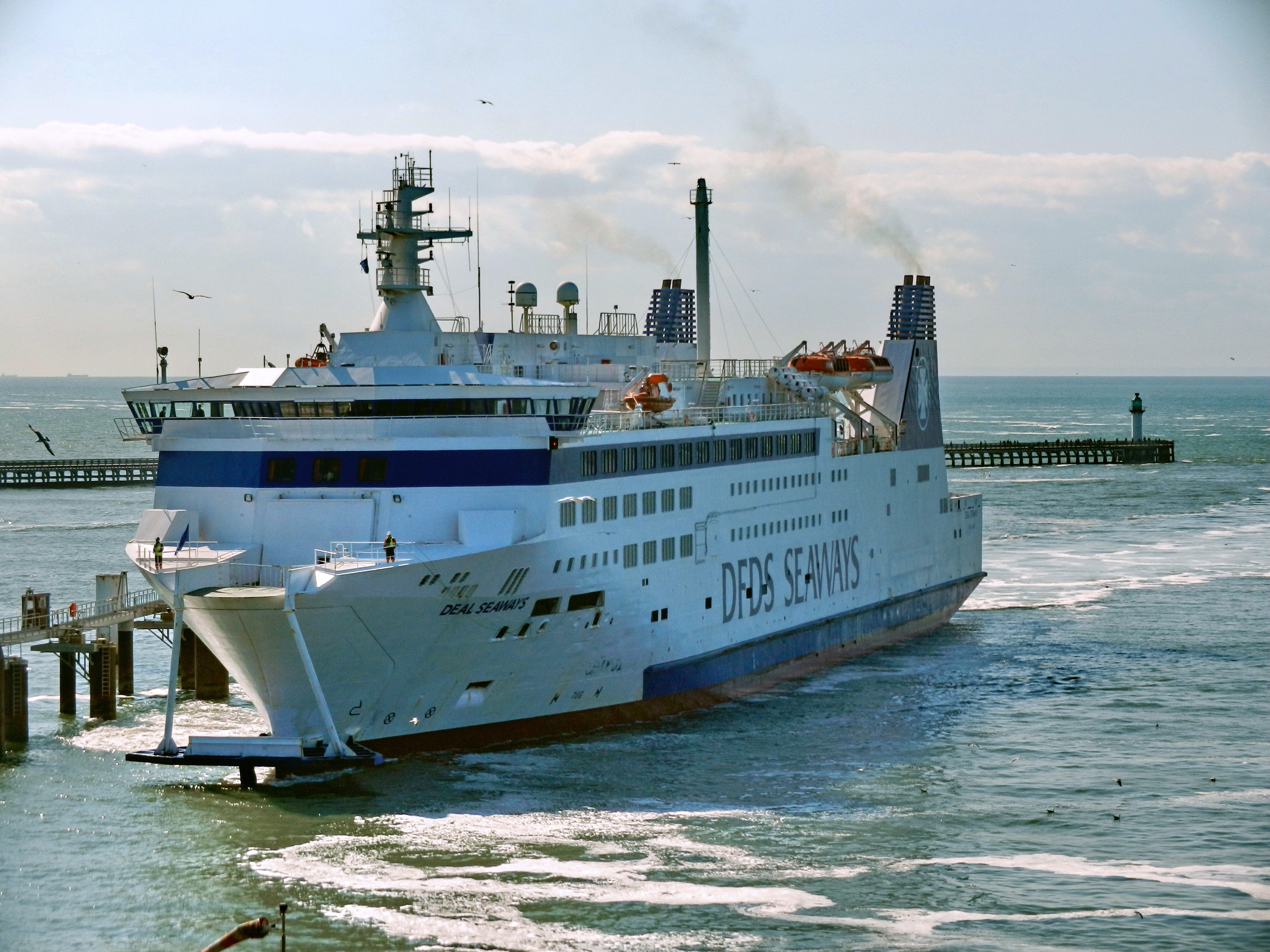
Deal Seaways at the Port of Calais in May 2011

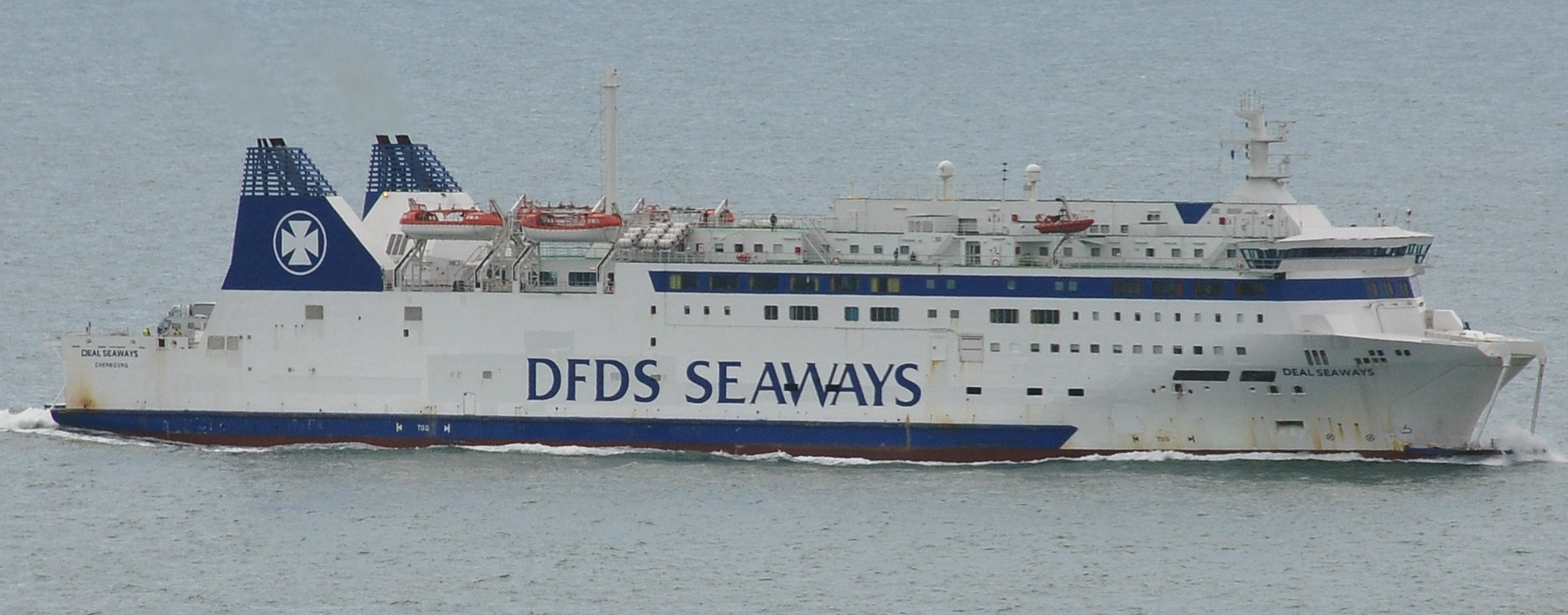
Deal Seaways off the White Cliffs of Dover. in June 2012

The French press reported on 23 March 2012 that the ship had been acquired by LD Lines/DFDS Seaways for their joint Dover–Calais service where she would be put into service starting on 27 April. Announcements from Brittany Ferries and DFDS confirmed that Barfleur was to be chartered by the DFDS/LD Lines joint venture. DFDS renamed her as Deal Seaways to ensure she had the same initials as their other ships, all DS.

Deal Seaways's charter was scheduled to end in February 2013 and Brittany Ferries announced that would be renaming her Barfleur, bringing her back into service. DFDS/LD Lines therefore sought a new vessel and managed to charter ex MS SeaFrance Moliere, which had been acquired by Scapino Shipping Ltd after SeaFrance's liquidation. Molière was renamed as MS Dieppe Seaways and joined the Dover/Calais fleet on 7 November 2012 leaving Deal Seaways out of service. Deal Seaways proceeded to Dunkerque for lay-up and de-storing, and was not used by DFDS Seaways before her livery was changed back to that of Brittany Ferries.

== Return to Poole-Cherbourg route ==
The Barfleur returned to the Poole–Cherbourg route on 19 March 2013, running alongside MV Cotentin which inaugurated a new route between Poole and Bilbao, also starting on the same date. The Barfleur re-commenced overnight services between Cherbourg and Poole in November 2013, on a Tuesday and a Wednesday in place of the usual evening service. These overnight sailings were also repeated in 2014 except during the peak summer period. In 2015, its twin funnels were enlarged to accept new exhaust scrubbers. The Barfleur was laid up for the winter period with the last sailing from Poole being on 31 January 2018 but returned to service on 4 March 2018.

In January 2023, during an interview with La Presse De La Manche (Actu.fr), Jean-Marc Roué told the interviewers that the company planned to replace Barfleur with the Cotentin. However the date for this was not confirmed, and was expected to be around 2026. In June 2026, Brittany Ferries announced both Barfleur and Cotentin were to be sold, and the Poole–Cherbourg route would close from November 2026 as passenger numbers had dropped by 70% since 2002.

The final sailing of Barfleur and the Poole to Cherbourg route was originally scheduled for 2 November 2026, however due to gearbox problems with fleet mate Commodore Clipper which saw early curtailment of the Portsmouth-Le Havre route on 22 September 2026, Barfleur was required to take her place on the Cherbourg-Rosslare route. She made her last crossing from Poole on 12 October 2026.

== Routes served ==
=== 2013 onwards ===
- Poole–Cherbourg

Commencing on 19 March 2013, Barfleur has run between Poole and Cherbourg, a short sailing of approximately 4 1/4 hours each way. There was a winter break from 1 January to 3 March 2018.

=== 1992–2012 ===
- Poole–Cherbourg

Due to a massive increase in passenger numbers on the Poole–Cherbourg route in 1991, Barfleur was lengthened by 19 metres during construction. This increased passenger and freight capacity as well as adding a number of additional cabins. But sources working on this project talk about stability issues and the addition of a section of 7.2 meters or 9 meters (?).

Until 27 February 2007 Barfleur was the largest ship ever to use Poole Harbour. MV Bretagne then held this title until the arrival of the MV Cotentin, after covering for Barfleur's unscheduled 2007 refit.

- Portsmouth–Cherbourg: March–November 2005

Barfleur operated one round trip Tuesday to Sunday in 2005 in place of a Poole round trip. This regular Portsmouth conventional service was unsuccessful and has not been repeated.

Barfleur has also served on Portsmouth–Caen (Ouistreham) where she acted as refit cover for MV Normandie and MV Val de Loire. During the winter seasons of 1997 and 1998 Barfleur operated between Poole and Santander at weekends and made the crossing in 28 hours.

As a result of major engine problems with Val de Loire in September 2000, Barfleur operated between Plymouth and Roscoff for two round trips before moving to Portsmouth–Caen (Ouistreham) in place of MV Duc de Normandie. Barfleur's place at Poole was taken by MV Purbeck.

On rare occasions Barfleur has also operated routes not usually undertaken by Brittany Ferries:-

- Poole–Caen

Barfleur has sailed on this route as a positioning move to provide refit cover but also as a result of strike action by French dockworkers in October 2002.

- Poole–Roscoff

As a result of the previously mentioned strike a round trip to Roscoff was undertaken in October 2002 to facilitate a crew change. This route was repeated between 23 and 26 May 2008 due to a blockade of Cherbourg by French fishermen.

- Cherbourg–Cork

In December 2005 Barfleur was chartered by Victor Treacy International for a one off freight-only crossing to help clear a buildup of freight caused by a strike at Irish Ferries.

== Accidents ==
On 16 July 2014 at 06:26 the ferry collided with a chain of the chain ferry crossing Poole harbour entrance, snapping the chain and causing the chain ferry to be out of action for two days. This happened on a previous occasion (believed to be around 1996) when damage to the rudder/propellers occurred. The chain ferry now remains stationary on the Studland side when large shipping is passing through.
