= MV Reine Mathilde =

Scrapped ferry built in 1970

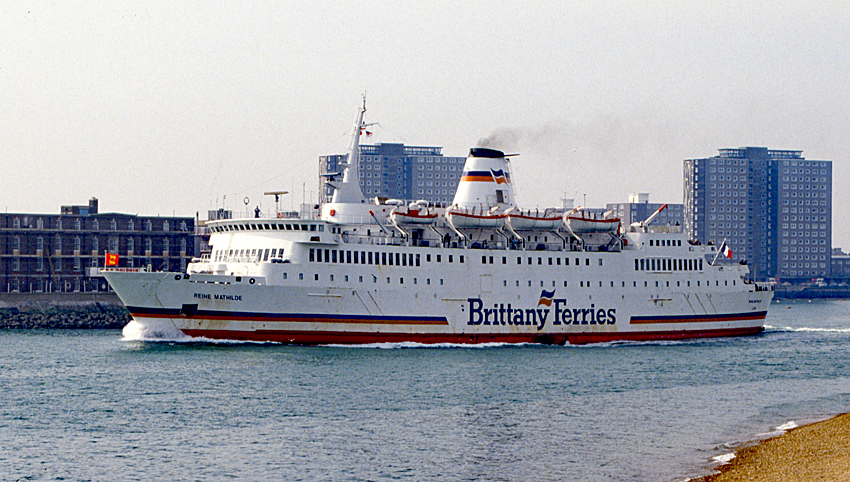
- Reine Mathilde departing Portsmouth

History
- Name: 1970-1978: Prince of Fundy; 1978-1988: Prince of Brittany; 1988-1991: Reine Mathilde; 1991-2005: Beauport
- Operator: 1970-1978: Lion Ferry; 1978-1992: Brittany Ferries; 1992-1994: BCIF; 1994-1994: Stern Maritime Line; 1994-1995: Hellenic Inter Ferries; 1995-2000: Comanav; 2000-2000: Sancak Lines; 2000-2005: Government of Trinidad & Tobago
- Port of registry: 1970-1978: Halmstad Sweden; 1978-1992: Caen France; 1992-2005: Nassau Bahamas
- Builder: Schiffbau Gesellschaft Unterweser AG, Bremerhaven
- Launched: 9 February 1970
- Identification: IMO number: 7010755
- Fate: Broken up 2005

General characteristics
- Tonnage: 5,464 GRT
- Length: 119.60 m (392 ft 5 in)
- Beam: 18.10 m (59 ft 5 in)
- Draught: 4.75 m (15 ft 7 in)
- Installed power: 2 × Pielstick 12PC2V diesels
- Speed: 17 knots (31.48 km/h; 19.56 mph)
- Capacity: 1,020 passengers; 520 berths; 210 cars

Reine Mathilde was a ferry operated by Brittany Ferries. She was built as the Prince of Fundy in 1970 by Schiffbau Gesellschaft Unterweser, AG, in Bremerhaven, Germany, for the Lion Ferry service between Portland, Maine, and Yarmouth, Nova Scotia.

== History ==
The Prince of Fundy inaugurated ferry service on the Portland - Yarmouth route between 1970 and 1976.

In 1976, Lion Ferry moved the ship to the Varberg - Grenå route between 27 November 1976 and March 1978.

The ship was chartered by Brittany Ferries from 17 April 1978 initially to sail on the Portsmouth-Santander route. Her main route was Portsmouth-Saint Malo and she was renamed Prince of Brittany. She was subsequently bought and registered in France in 1980.

On 30 December 1988, she was renamed Reine Mathilde in preparation for her transfer to the Portsmouth-Caen (Ouistreham) route alongside the Duc de Normandie. In 1991, prior to the arrival of the Normandie, the Reine Mathilde was retired from service with Brittany Ferries and sold.

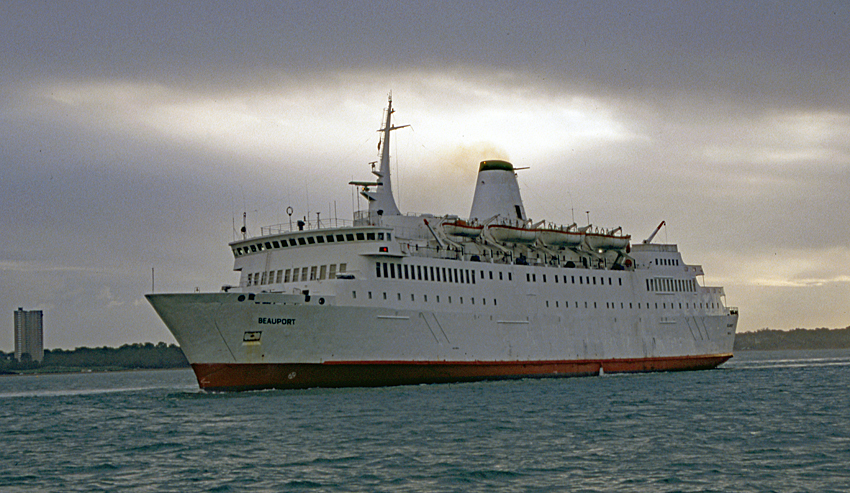
Beauport arriving in Southampton for laying up, 1991

She was subsequently chartered by British Channel Island Ferries (BCIF) in which Brittany Ferries held a large share. In 1992, she took up service between Poole and the Channel Islands under a Bahamas registration and renamed Beauport. By the end of 1993, BCIF was experiencing financial difficulties due to competition from Condor Ferries and Beauport was returned to its owner, her passenger ship role with BCIF being taken by the Havelet.

Beauport was laid up in Southampton until mid-1994 when she was chartered to the Stern Maritime Line for its Bari - Çeşme route. After this, the ship was laid up again in 1994 but quickly found work with a Greek shipping company between Brindisi, Igoumenitsa and Patras, after which she continued on the Mediterranean regularly sailing to Morocco for Comanav. Between work with Comanav, the Beauport was chartered to the Private Media Group and carried the marketing name of Private Lady.

In 2000, Beauport moved to Sancak Lines for service between Brindisi and Çeşme. Later that year she was chartered to the Government of Trinidad and Tobago. In 2005, she was sent to India and was scrapped on a beach at Alang.
