= MS Normandy =

Ferry

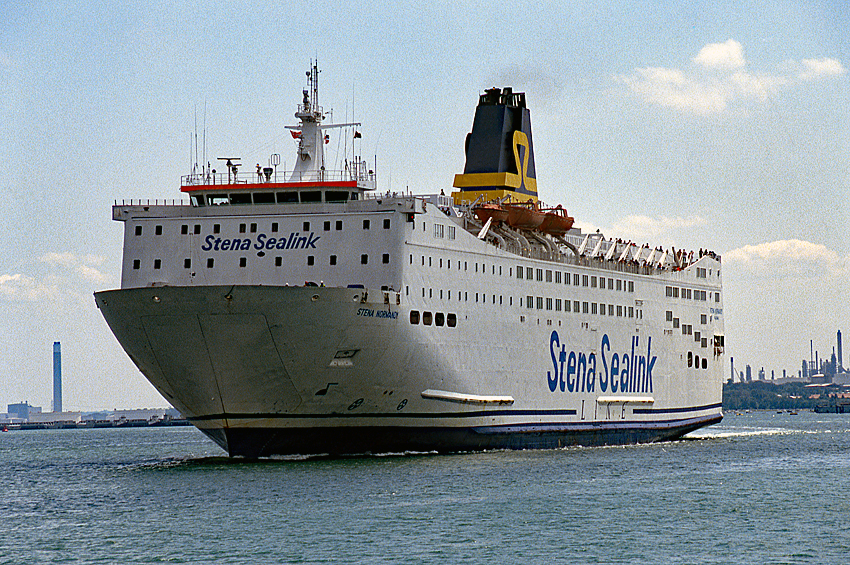
- Stena Normandy entering the River Itchen

History
- Name: 1981-1982: GV 909; 1982-1983: Prinsessan Birgitta; 1983-1991: St Nicholas; 1991-1997: Stena Normandy; 1997-2012: Normandy
- Owner: 1981-1982: Götaverken shipyard; 1982-1983: Stena Sessan Line; 1983-1986: Hill Samuel Trading Ltd; 1986-1989: various Stena Line subsidiaries; 1989-1999: Rederi AB Gotland; 1999-2008: Irish Ferries; 2008-2012: Equinox Offshore Accommodation
- Operator: 1982-1983: Stena Sessan Line; 1983-1990: Sealink; 1990-1996: Stena Line; 1997: Tallink; 1998-2007: Irish Ferries; 2008: Ferrimaroc
- Port of registry: 1981-1983: Gothenburg, Sweden; 1983-1988: London, United Kingdom; 1988-1997: Nassau, Bahamas; 1997: Tallinn, Estonia; 1997-1998: Nassau, Bahamas; 1998-1999: Dublin, Ireland; 1999-?: Hamilton, Bermuda; ?-2012: Limassol, Cyprus
- Builder: Götaverken, Gothenburg, Sweden
- Yard number: 909
- Launched: 22 May 1981
- Christened: 7 June 1982 by Princess Birgitta of Sweden
- Completed: December 1981
- Acquired: 3 May 1982
- In service: 3 June 1982
- Out of service: September 2008
- Identification: IMO number: 7901772
- Fate: Scrapped
- Notes: Sister ship of Stena Europe

General characteristics (as built)
- Tonnage: 14,368 GT; 3,315 DWT
- Length: 149.03 m (488.94 ft)
- Beam: 26.01 m (85.33 ft)
- Draught: 6.10 m (20.01 ft)
- Installed power: 4 × NOHAB-Wärtsilä Vasa 12V32A; 15,360 kW (combined)
- Speed: 19.5 knots (36.1 km/h; 22.4 mph)
- Capacity: 2,100 passengers; 400 passenger beds; 700 cars; 70 trailers

General characteristics (currently)
- Tonnage: 17,043 GT
- Capacity: 2,060 passengers; 1,156 passenger beds; 450 cars; 50 trailers

The MS Normandy was a ferry, last owned by the Singapore-based oil service company Equinox Offshore Accommodation, under charter to the Morocco-based ferry operator Ferrimaroc. She was built in 1981 by Götaverken, Gothenburg, Sweden, and first entered service in 1982 as MS Prinsessan Birgitta for Stena Sessan Line. She also served under the names MS St Nicholas and MS Stena Normandy.

== Concept and Construction ==
The ship, along with her sister, Kronprinsessan Victoria, was originally ordered from Götaverken on 15 February 1979 by Sessanlinjen, Sweden. The two ships were to replace much smaller vessels on the route and were seen as a way for Sessanlinjen to compete with their main rival Stena Line.

Whilst the ships were built at Arendal, this had not been the intention when planning the new builds. Sessanlinjen managing director; Ulf Trapp had originally approached Aalborg Værft in Denmark to collaborate on the design of the new ships. Aalborg Værft had previously designed and built several of the company's previous ships since the early 1960s and the collaboration resulted in a design which could carry 2,100 passengers (400 cabin berths) and 700 cars, including a large Copa Room-style tiered show lounge; the first of their kind on a new-build passenger ship. During the 1970s there was a downturn in the Swedish shipbuilding industries, with few new ships being ordered from Swedish shipyards. The Swedish Government intervened offering subsidies and encouragement to ferry companies to build their new tonnage in Sweden (the Finnish and Danish governments had similar schemes at the time also). As a result of these subsidies, when it was time to place the order for Sessanlinjen's new ships, the order went to the Arendal Shipyard of Götaverken instead of Aalborg Værft, as Sessanlinjen had perhaps originally anticipated.

Given the level of government subsidies which were given to secure the order, the Swedish Government were closely involved in the process and the subsidies were conditional on Sessanlinjen being able to demonstrate financial stability. The suggestion of reviving an earlier collaboration with Stena Line was rebuffed by Sten A. Olsson and resulted in Stena Line ordering their own new ships for the same route. Shortly after, 26% of Sessanlinjen was purchased by Tor Line and Sessan Tor Line was formed to operate services by both companies, which improved the financial standing of Sessanlinjen to such a degree that funding was granted for one of their new build ships, with negotiations between Stena Line and Sessan Tor Line resulting in both agreeing to forgo one new ship each and form a jointly owned company to market both companies traffic on the Gothenburg-Frederikshavn route. Funding approval in August 1980 for the second ship saw this agreement collapse, putting both companies on track for an estimated combined loss of 150 million Krone in 1982.

At the time of the order, the Sessanlinjen ships were planned not only to be the largest ferries on their routes, but to be among the largest ferries in the world and with the ships having planned delivery dates in 1981, this attracted rival Stena Line's renewed attention. Stena Line's own pair of new ships (Stena Danica and Stena Jutlandica) for the Gothenburg-Frederikshavn route, were experiencing construction delays at the Chantiers de France-Dunkerque (later Chantiers du Nord et de la Mediterranee) shipyard, and this meant their ships would not enter service until 1983, giving Sessanlinjen the chance to gain a two-year advantage over Stena. Stena's solution was to purchase the majority of shares in Sessanlinjen, leading to the formation of Stena Sessan Line.

Stena's takeover of Sessanlinjen was approved at extraordinary general meeting of Sessanlinjen in January 1981 after Stena had acquired all the shares in Sessan that were available to purchase, and this resulted in a vote to terminate the agreement with Tor Line from 1 March 1981. Both Stena and Sessanlinjen presented the takeover in a positive light, but Tor Line sued Sessanlinjen for breach of contract, which ended in a small compensation settlement being awarded to Tor Line.

The takeover by Stena also addressed two other concerns which had been circulating at the time; namely the financial situation of Sessanlinjen, and therefore their ability to pay for their two ships, and the overcapacity that would have been created with four new ferries entering service between Gothenburg-Frederikshavn at largely the same time (two for Sessanlinjen and two for Stena).

The difference between the orders placed by Sessanlinjen and Stena illustrate the different financial situations of the companies. Sessanlinjen's two ships were designed with flexibility in mind, and by specifying the 400 cabin berths and multi-functional arrangements to the main passenger spaces, the ships would also be suitable for deployment on the overnight sailings on the Gothenburg-Travemünde route. Stena on the other hand ordered Stena Danica and Stena Jutlandica with only a few cabins below the car deck, as they were designed solely for daytime sailings Gothenburg-Frederikshavn route, whilst also at the same time ordering four overnight ferries for other routes. Ironically, these four ships; Stena Germanica, Stena Scandinavica, Stena Polonica and Stena Baltica also encountered major delays while under construction at Stocznia Gdynia, Poland, with the latter two being cancelled (and sold to other operators) and the former two swapping names upon their eventual delivery in 1986/7 having been ordered in 1979.

After Stena acquired Sessan they cancelled the order for the second new Sessanlinjen ship, and the shipyard were forced to complete her on their own account. Temporarily named MS GV 909 and registered in Gothenburg, the ship was completed in December 1981 and subsequently laid up in Gothenburg.

== Service ==
=== 1982-1983: Stena Line ===
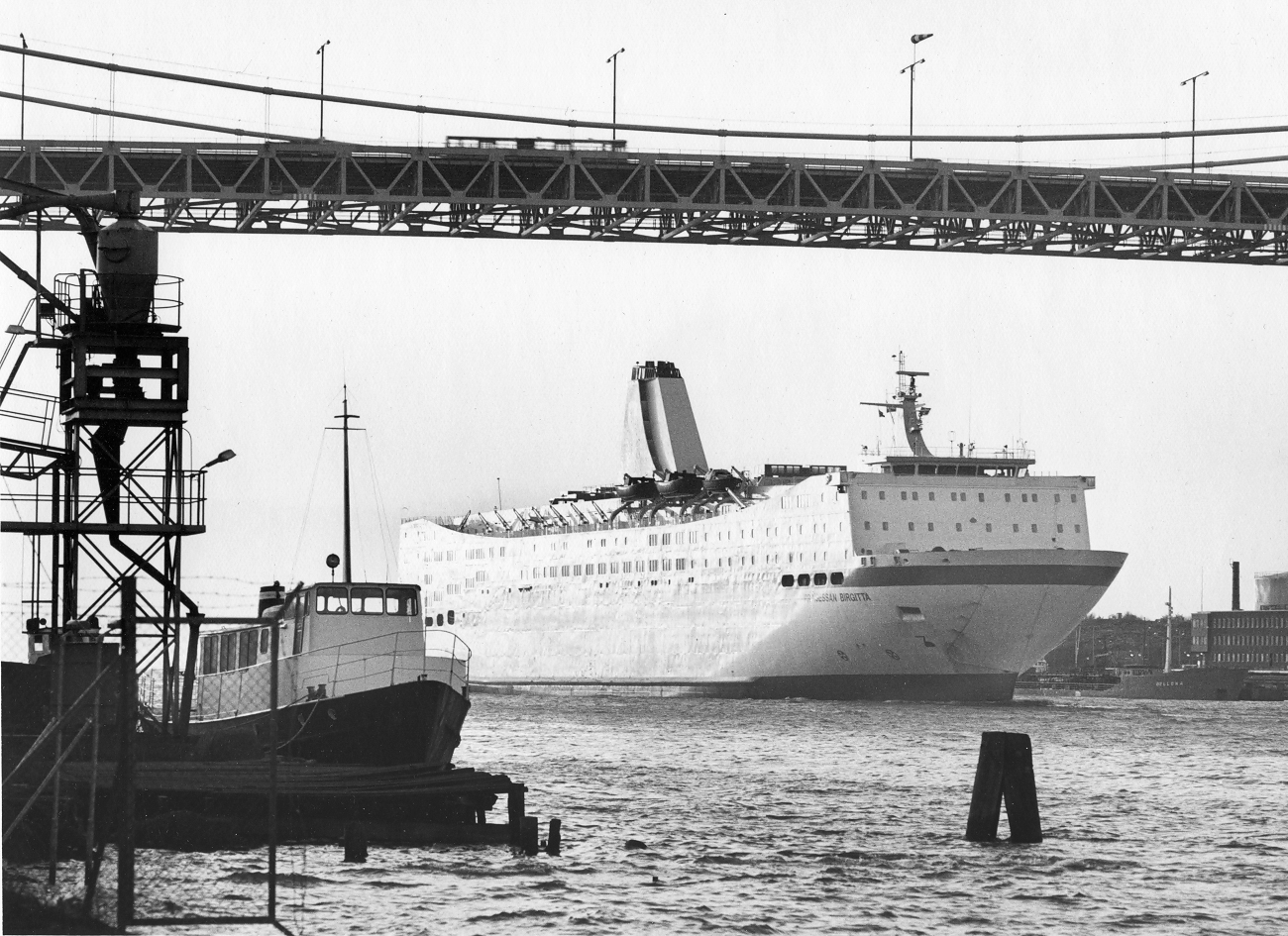
Prinsessan Birgitta in Gothenburg Harbour

In May 1982, Stena Sessan changed their mind and decided to purchase the GV 909 after all. The company wanted to name the ship Drottning Silvia in honour of Queen Silvia of Sweden, but the Royal Household of Sweden declined. Eventually the ship was named M/S Prinsessan Birgitta in honour Princess Birgitta, sister of King Carl XVI Gustav. Princess Brigitta herself christened the ship on 7 June 1982 (the ship had already entered traffic on 3 June). Prinsessan Birgitta's service with Stena Sessan proved to be short, as upon the entry into service of Stena Danica Prinsessan Birgitta was chartered to Sealink in February 1983, for use on their services between Harwich and Hoek van Holland.

Sealink's closest rivals on the Harwich-Hook route was Olau Line's service between Sheerness and Vlissingen, which proved popular with Londoners. The introduction by Olau of new, large state-of-the-art cruiseferries; Olau Hollandia and Olau Britannia in 1981 and 1982 respectively, and the resulting raising of standards, is cited as one of the reasons, along with the need to prepare for the privatisation of Sealink, that the Prinsessan Birgitta was chartered by Sealink for a reported £3 million per year fee.

=== 1983-1996: Sealink ===
Prior to entering service with Sealink, Prinsessan Birgitta was rebuilt at Götaverken with additional cabin facilities for a reported £2.5 million, renamed MS St Nicholas on 15 June 1983 by Elizabeth Henderson; wife of the Sealink deputy managing director, and registered under the flag of the United Kingdom, with London as her home port. The new name of the ship was as a result of a competition run by the BBC, with the four children who had suggested the chosen name given a short cruise on the ferry following the naming ceremony. In June 1983, she was set on Sealink's Hook of Holland—Harwich route. During the same month she was sold by Stena to Hill Samuel Trading Ltd, who continued chartering her to Sealink.

The ship entered service wearing a temporary livery, with the original Sessanlinjen 'pinstripe' and the red Stena funnel, pending the upcoming privatisation of Sealink in 1984 by the UK Government. The ship gained its new livery while at overhaul in Dunkerque in March 1984, and the £66m sale of Sealink to Sea Containers took place in July 1984, with the company being renamed Sealink British Ferries.

In 1986 the charter for the ship was extended and she was sold again, this time to a group of Stena subsidiaries. During the following two years she was sold three more times from one Stena subsidiary to another. None of these sales had any effect on her traffic.

In 1988, the ship was sold by Stena to Sealink for a reputed $41 million (equivalent in 1988 to £23.428 million) and her home port was changed to Nassau, Bahamas. Sealink quickly sold the ship again, this time for a reported SEK 368 million (equivalent in 1989 to £36.327 million) to the Sweden-based Rederi AB Gotland, who continued to charter the ship to Sealink. This sale was motivated by a hostile takeover bid for Sealink parent company, Sea Containers, by a joint venture between Stena Line and Tiphook, called Temple Holdings, received by the company in May 1989, resulting in Sea Containers owner James Sherwood instigating a $1.1 billion asset disposal and recapitalisation programme to justify a higher share price and ultimately defeat the Temple Holdings offer.

In January 1990 Stena Line made an offer of $481 million (£259 million) to Sea Containers for the majority of their ferry services (excluding the Isle of Wight and Hoverspeed services and the holding in the Isle of Man Steam Packet) and with it their former ship. In January 1991 St Nicholas was rebuilt at Lloyd Werft, Bremerhaven, Germany and renamed Stena Normandy. After briefly returning to the Hook of Holland—Harwich route, she was transferred to the Southampton—Cherbourg service in June 1991.

Stena Normandy was joined on the Southampton route for the 1992 season by Stena Traveller, showing a commitment to the Western Channel by Stena, which ultimately wasn't repeated. Stena Normandy stayed on the service until November 1996 (her last passenger sailing for Stena being from Cherbourg to Southampton on 1 December), and she was laid up in Dunkerque ahead of the expiry of her charter agreement on 31 December 1996.

=== 1997: Tallink ===
After being laid up for two months, she was chartered to the Estonian ferry company Tallink in January 1997. As part of this charter, she was renamed Normandy. She began service with Tallink on 23 April 1997, after being re-registered in Tallinn, Estonia. Her sailings on the Tallinn, Estonia - Helsingfors, Finland route continued throughout the rest of the year until her charter to Tallink ended on 30 December 1997, after which she reverted to Bahamian flag.

In January 1998 it was announced that Rederi AB Gotland had chartered Normandy to Irish Ferries. Before this charter commenced she sailed to the Swedish island of Gotland and made her first, and only, call at Visby, the home port of her then owners. Here certain items were offloaded to her owners before the ship sailed on to Dublin.

=== 1998-2007: Irish Ferries ===
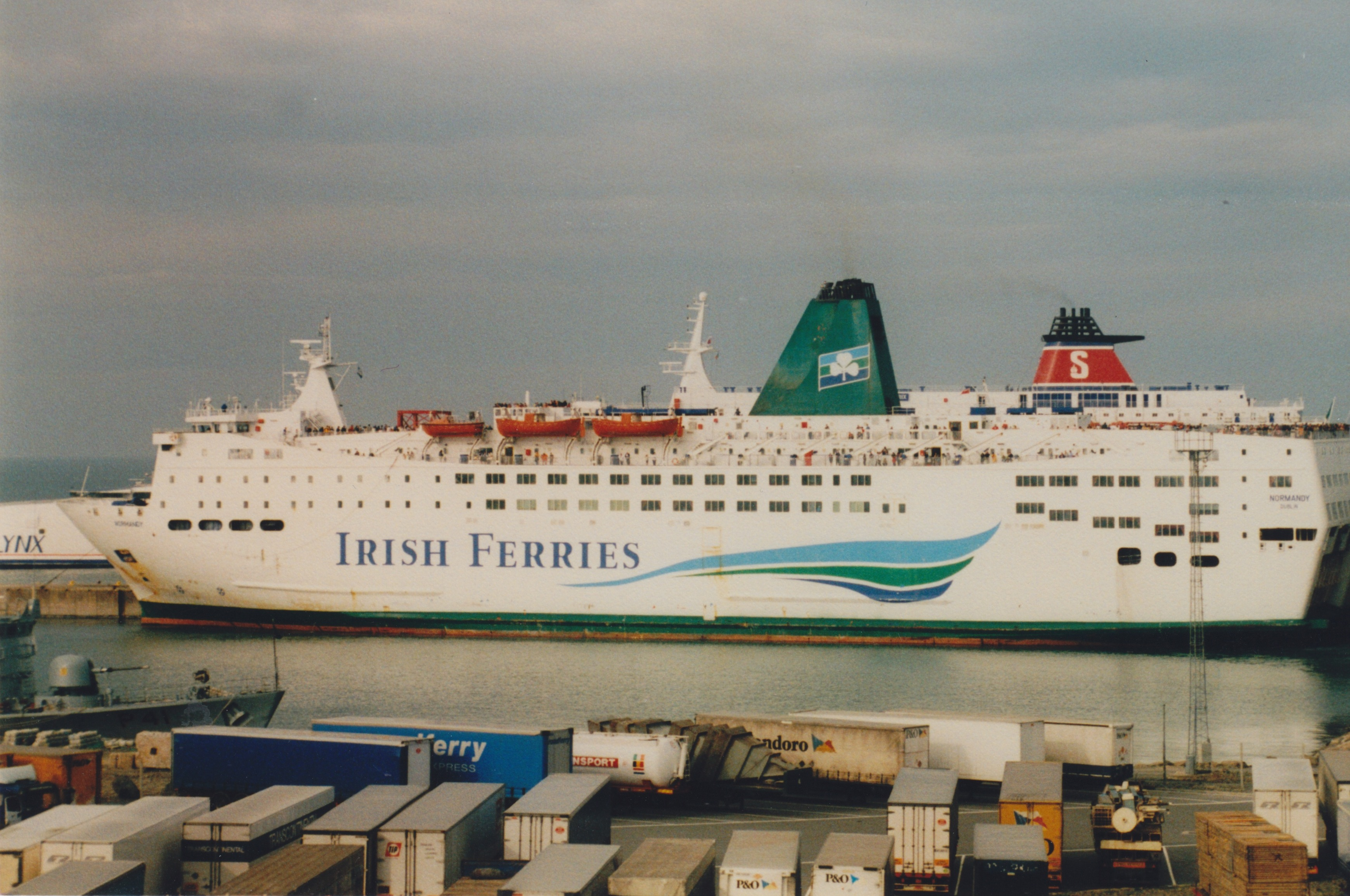
Normandy at Rosslare Harbour in 1999

On 29 February 1998 she began service For Irish Ferries on their Rosslare—Pembroke Dock route, before moving in April of that year to the Cork—Roscoff and Rosslare—Cherbourg services.

In October 1999, it was announced that Rederi AB Gotland sold Normandy to Irish Continental Group for $18.4 million and as a result, was re-registered to Hamilton, Bermuda. Between January and March 2000 her interiors were rebuilt at a Polish shipyard. During the same docking side sponsons were added to her hull for improved stability. On her return to the service the refit she was placed on Irish Ferries services from Ireland to France.

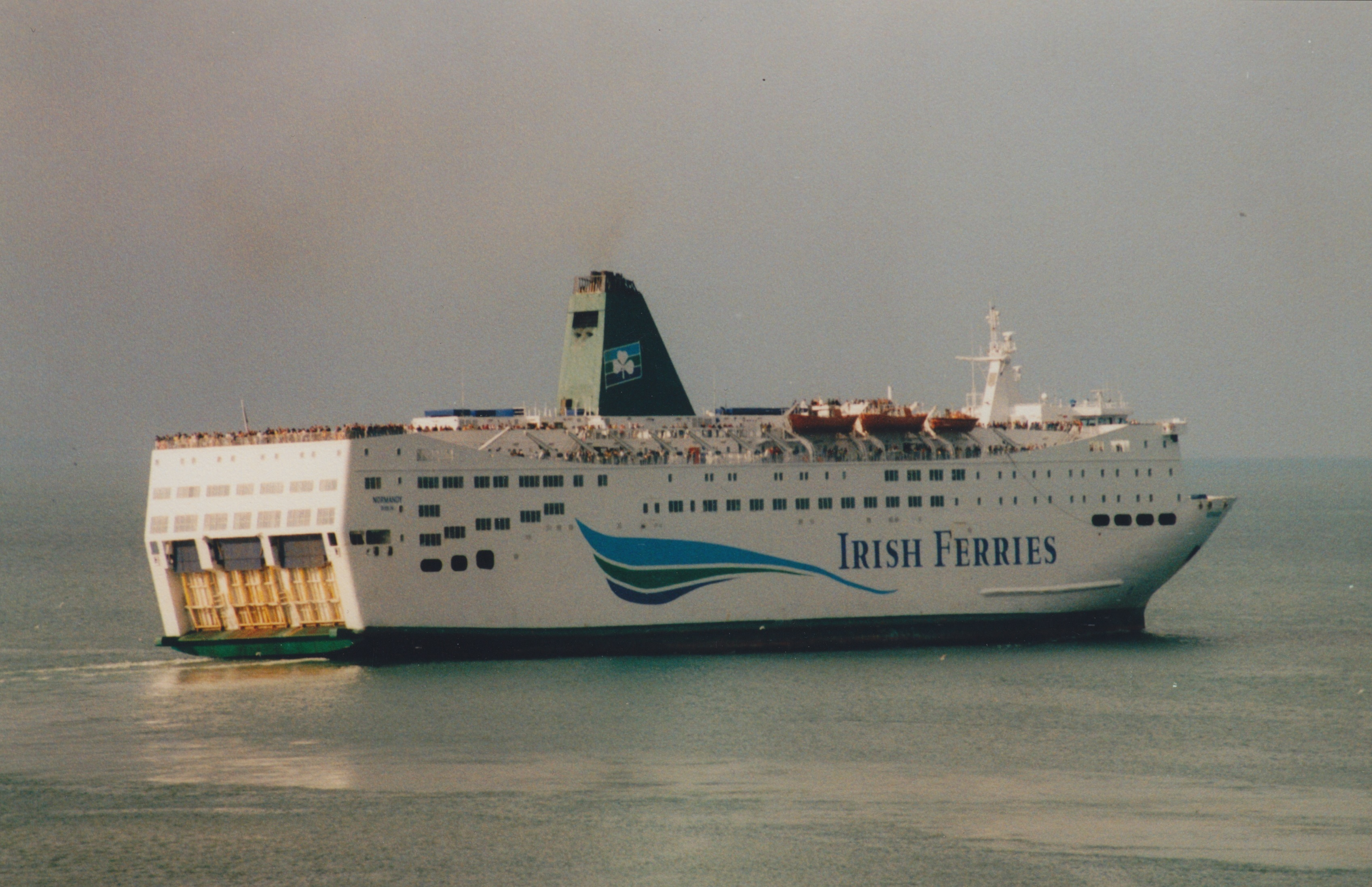
Normandy in August 1999

Despite the 2000 refurbishment, in 2003, a further €1 million were spent on refurbishment of public areas, improving access and adding a beauty salon. In February 2004 the ship was out of traffic for four days due to a conflict between Irish Ferries and their employees on board. The same was repeated between 27 November and 14 December 2005. A further refit was undertaken at Harland & Wolff, Belfast in February 2006.

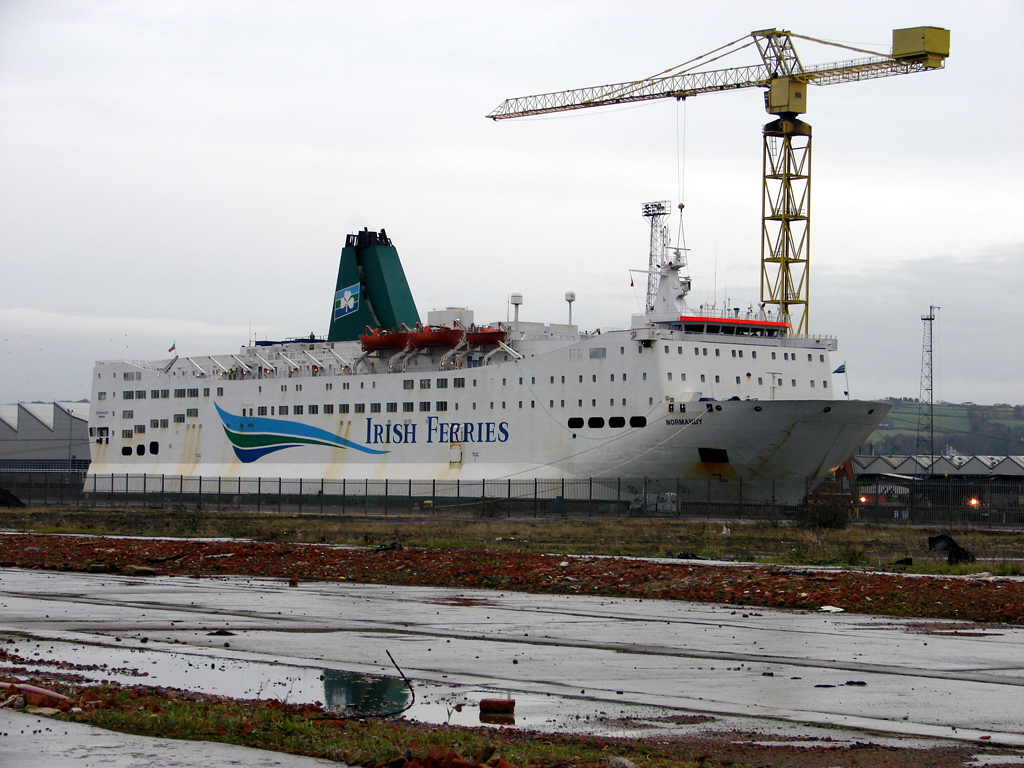
Normandy at Dry Dock, Belfast in 2007

Irish Ferries purchased a new ferry; Kronprins Harald from Color Line in January 2007, with the ship initially being chartered back to Color Line for six months. In September 2007 this ship was renamed Oscar Wilde and was announced as a replacement for the Normandy, which was taken out of service on 4 November 2007. She was laid up in Fredericia, Denmark pending sale.

=== 2008: Ferrimaroc ===
Her layup would prove to be short as she was sold to the Singapore-based oil service company Equinox Offshore Accommodation on 28 January 2008. The new owners planned to rebuild her into an Accommodation and Repair Vessels (ARV) at SembCorp Marine shipyards, Singapore and she was planned to be one of a least three similar vessels created from used car and passenger ferries. Second hand cranes, propellers and other equipment would be used in the conversion to speed the process, and Normandy was to be the second such vessel, to be named ARV 2 following the convention of her fleetmate ARV 1 (formerly Baleària's Meloodia).

However, instead of being immediately rebuilt she was chartered on a six-month charter to the Morocco-based Ferrimaroc in March 2008, entering service on their Almería—Nador route in April 2008.

=== 2008-2012: Decline and Scrapping ===
She finally left the Mediterranean in the Autumn of 2008 and arrived in Singapore on 19 October for her planned conversion, which was expected to be complete in Spring 2009. The conversion of ARV 1 took far longer than expected and it was not until July 2010 that sea trials for that ship finally took place. It was expected that conversion would commence soon after, but the failure of the charter of her sister ship saw Normandy remain berthed in Singapore, still awaiting conversion.

Ultimately the planned conversion of Normandy never happened, and the ship remained at the berth in Singapore. The condition of the ship declined rapidly with broken windows allowing flooding, mould and plants to take over the interior of the ship and an inspection of the vessel in July 2012 at the request of the ships insurer found that little maintenance had taken place since 2008, leaving her in a state of severe disrepair. As a result, the insurer cancelled their cover leaving the owners little option but to sell her for scrap.

On 31 October 2012, Normandy left Singapore for India, arriving at the Alang Ship Breaking Yard on 25 November 2012 and was scrapped shortly after.
