= British Channel Island Ferries =

Ferry operator between the United Kingdom and the Channel Islands

- Industry: Passenger transportation Freight transportation
- Founded: 1984
- Defunct: 1994
- Fate: Acquired by Commodore Shipping 1994
- Successor: Condor Ferries
- Headquarters: Weymouth, United Kingdom
- Area served: Channel Islands

British Channel Island Ferries (BCIF) was a ferry operator who ran services between the United Kingdom and the Channel Islands.

== History ==
=== Channel Island Ferries ===
The company was founded in August 1984 as Channel Island Ferries by a consortium made up of Brittany Ferries, Huelin Renouf and Mainland Market Deliveries (MMD) to compete with Sealink British Ferries services to Portsmouth and Weymouth. Discussions had been taking place between consortium members and the States of Jersey since May of that year and once the involvement of MMD became clear, their position as Sealink's then biggest freight customer led to robust exchanges. The original plan had been to use the then surplus Penn-Ar-Bed, but this ship was ruled unsuitable due to requirements to reduce freight capacity under the British flag by the Department of Trade.

Channel Island Ferries established their service from Portsmouth to the Channel Islands using the ferry Corbière, previously the Benodet of Brittany Ferries. The maiden sailing for the company was on 27 March 1985 sailing from Jersey to Portsmouth via Guernsey, with Terence Alexander, an actor who appeared in the then current TV series; Bergerac, being the first passenger to board in his character's trademark white Rolls-Royce. This followed a public open day on board the ship which attracted 8,000 visitors.

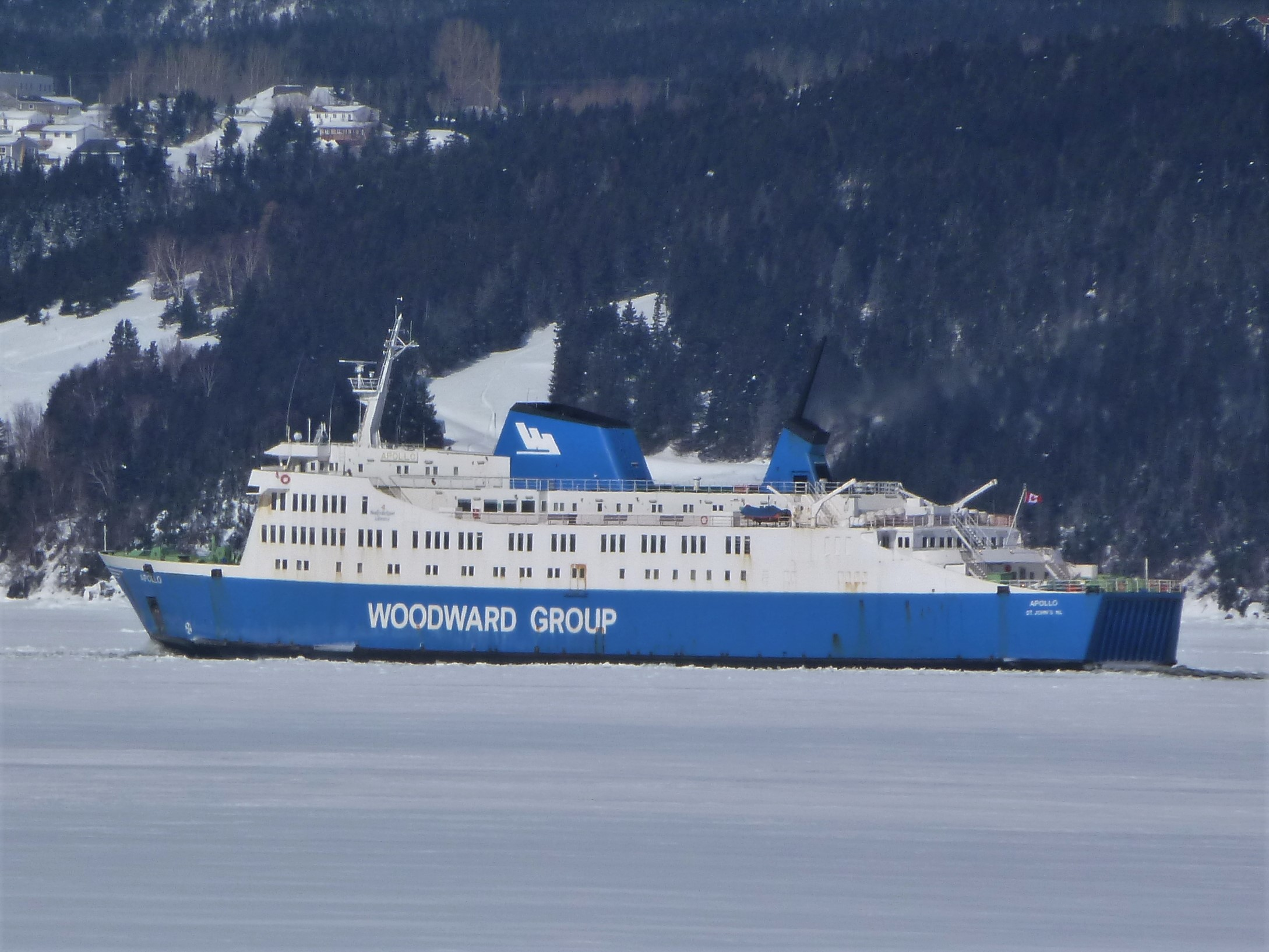
MV Apollo, the former Corbière of BCIF, seen in Canada later in its career

Sealink British Ferries had made a number of unpopular changes to its services and fare structure for the 1985 season launching their Starliner service from Portsmouth, using their ships Earl Granville and Earl William, and their Sunliner service from Weymouth utilising the Earl Harold. This coupled with fares more than doubling on Sealink services (an ordinary adult fare went from £52 to £118) resulted in Channel Island Ferries gaining 85% of the passenger market from Portsmouth, this later dropped to 53% in 1986 after Sealink reorganised their fares and sailings to combat Channel Island Ferries following massive losses, reported to be in the order of £6 million.

The company had made such an impact on the Channel Island market, coupled with the rise of air competition, that Sealink entered into talks in May 1986 to merge the two companies operations to save money and reduce over-capacity, with Sealink having lost £11 million in 1985 and being on track to lose a further £7 million in 1986, and a Sealink director commenting that "in the past no Channel Islands service has ever made an adequate return". The joint venture was announced on 30 September 1986 and would be 50% owned by Channel Island Ferries and 50% by Sealink British Ferries. The plan was for the new company to be known as British Channel Island Ferries and operate the Corbière and Sealink's Earl Granville from Portsmouth and maintain a summer only service from Weymouth using Earl Harold. Earl Godwin would provide a separate Sealink service to Cherbourg and there were no firm plans for the future of Earl William. The announcement, which would have seen 492 job losses (all but 30 being ex-Sealink staff) resulted in almost immediate strike action by the crews of the four Sealink vessels which included the blockade of Guernsey's only linkspan by the Earl William forcing Channel Island Ferries to suspend their service to the island for five days from 13 October, having run a temporary service involving discharging passengers using a temporary footbridge and shipping cars to Jersey and then back to Guernsey using the Devoniun of Torbay Seaways. After 18 days, Earl William sailed to Weymouth to join the other Sealink ships on strike.

Sealink were unable to reach an agreement with their crew to join the new service which meant Sealink were not able to fulfil its agreement to provide the Earl Granville and Earl Harold for the new service. Channel Island Ferries later took out a series of high court injunctions against Sealink which allowed Channel Island Ferries to trade as British Channel Island Ferries and prevented Sealink for offering a service to the Islands for twelve months. Separately, Jersey authorities banned Sealink from serving St Helier for twelve months.

Channel Island Ferries compulsorily purchased Sealink's 50% share in BCIF in January 1987, giving them full ownership. Legal wranglings continued until 1991.

Sealink returned to the Channel Islands, following the expiration of their one-year ban, with a symbolic extension of the Portsmouth-Cherbourg service, at the end of March 1988 using Earl Granville. At this time, they were still prevented from visiting Jersey, and services were ultimately discontinued in 1989.

=== British Channel Island Ferries ===
The original plan for 1987, running three ships from two ports, was unworkable due to the collapse of the joint venture, so the company needed two additional vessels to run a full service to the Channel Islands. Sealink's offer to charter the Vortigern was not taken up as her cabin accommodation was insufficient, and BCIF instead chartered the Brittany Ferries freight ferry Briezh-Izel to run alongside the Corbière from Portsmouth, and the Portelet to run the new service from Weymouth, scheduled to start on 15 April 1987.

There were problems with the introduction of Portelet in April 1987: the Department of Transport were dissatisfied with the methods and materials used to construct new cabins on the ship, and they only issued a temporary certificate to operate with a reduced capacity. Once this issue was resolved, the company had a fairly successful first season, carrying nearly 138,000 passengers and around 28,000 cars by late September. Portelet was laid up in Weymouth over the winter before being rechartered by BCIF in Spring 1988. Re-entering service after a £200,000 package of improvements, the 1988 season was less successful than the previous year with services by Condor Ferries starting to make an impact on passenger numbers.

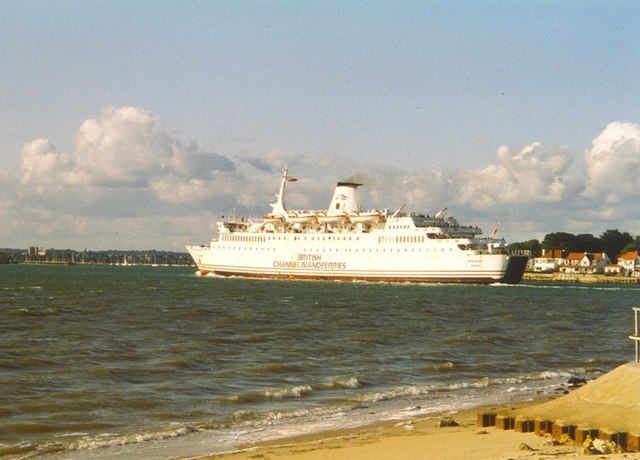
Beauport entering Poole Harbour

After much speculation, the company announced in August 1988 its decision to focus services on the port of Poole from 2 January 1989, allowing them to reduce crossing times to the islands by up to two hours. Services from Portsmouth ended with a New Year mini cruise which saw Corbière depart on 30 December 1988, returning to port on 2 January 1989 to disembark passengers and vehicles before sailing to Poole to start the new service, and the Weymouth service was curtailed on 1 October 1988.

Corbière was replaced by the Rozel on the new Poole service on 21 February 1989; she was the largest ship ever used on the Channel Islands service. She became a popular addition to the fleet. The Briezh-Izel was initially replaced by the Corbière running freight only until the arrival of the Havelet, formerly the Cornouailles, from Brittany Ferries' Truckline service on 10 May 1989. The Corbière then left the fleet for further service with Truckline between Poole and Cherbourg.

The move to Poole and the introduction of the Rozel were successful for the company with passenger journeys rising by 20% during its first year, but growth in the freight market from the port was slow. The move by BCIF to Poole led to the establishment in 1989 of a rival joint venture service between Commodore Shipping and MMD from Portsmouth, called C&M Shipping. BCIF's response was to charter a dedicated freight vessel from parent company Huelin Renouf, the L Taurus which that company had acquired as part of their complex takeover of Torbay Seaways. The ship was renamed Sylbe and entered service in 1990.

1990 also saw BCIF join forces with Emeraude Ferries and Brittany Ferries to launch a 'French Connection' service which would allow a Poole-Jersey, Jersey-St Malo, St Malo-Portsmouth round trip to be booked as a single journey across the three operators.

A 1990 refit saw the Havelet arrested in port in November that year after a dispute over payment. The ship had sailed to Humber Ship Repairers in Hull for a five week long project in April 1990 at a cost of £2 million. Humber Ship Repairers collapsed shortly after completion leading to a sub contractor remaining unpaid for a car ramp, despite BCIF having paid the full amount due to Humber. The sub contractor obtained a warrant for the arrest of the ferry from the Admiralty Court leading to it being impounded at Poole for two days.

=== Downfall ===
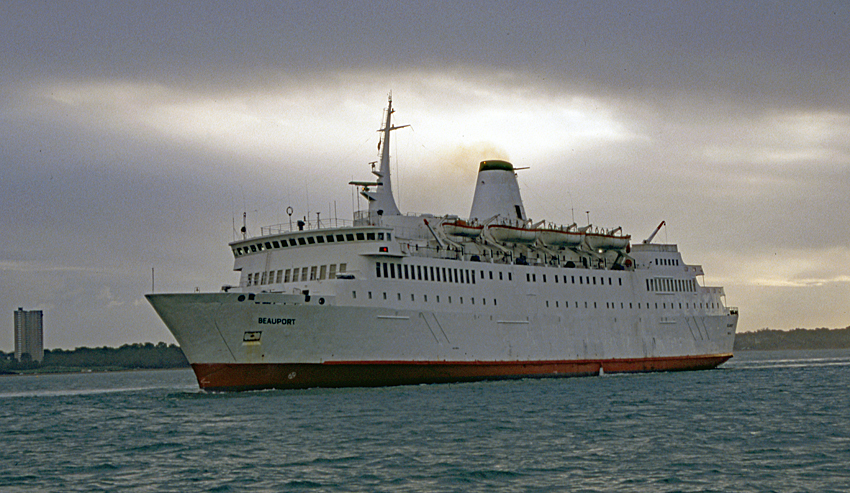
Beauport arriving in Southampton for laying up

In late summer 1991 it was announced that the company had not renewed the charter of the Rozel and that she would be replaced by the Reine Mathilde from Brittany Ferries, which was renamed Beauport. This ship was smaller and not as popular with passengers as the Rozel: this was one of the factors that contributed to the downfall of the company.

In April 1993, Condor Ferries introduced a high speed catamaran service from Weymouth to the Channel Islands for passengers and vehicles. This had a significant effect on BCIF, who until then had been the only operator of car-carrying services on the route. BCIF operated a reduced passenger service for that season and become involved in a price war with Condor. Passenger numbers fell significantly, and the charter of the Beauport was not renewed at the end of 1993. The company planned that the Havelet would be their main passenger ship for the 1994 season, with the Truckline vessel Purbeck being brought as freight ship.

In January 1994 it was announced that due to substantial losses, BCIF had been bought by Commodore Shipping. Freight services were transferred to Commodore Ferries at Portsmouth, and passenger operations moved to Condor at Weymouth, where the Havelet would run a conventional service alongside the Condor 10. Operations of under the BCIF name would cease on 22 January 1994, with around 100 staff being made redundant from that date. The move away from Poole by Condor resulted in a long-running legal battle with Poole Harbour Commissioners, who claimed the move at short notice broke a ten-year contract with BCIF, which resulted in the loss of 35 jobs at the port. The deal, signed in 1989, had been worth £300,000 per year to the port. The commissioners had claimed £4 million damages from Condor, although an undisclosed settlement was reached between the two parties days before a court hearing in June 1996.

== Fleet ==
Name	Built	In service	Tonnage	History
Corbière	1970 (Jos L. Meyer Verft, Papenburg, Germany)	1985–1989	4,371 GT	Scrapped at Aliağa Ship Breaking Yard in 2021
Portelet	1967 (Cammel Laird & Company, Birkenhead, England)	1987–1988	6,280 GT	Scrapped at Chittagong Ship Breaking Yard in 2004
Briezh-Izel	1970 (Taikoo Dockyard & Engineering Company, Quarry Bay, Hong Kong)	1987–1989	2,769 GT	Scrapped at Aliağa Ship Breaking Yard in 2014
Rozel	1974 (Cammel Laird & Company, Birkenhead, England)	1989–1992	8,987 GT	Scrapped at Aliağa Ship Breaking Yard in 2009
Havelet	1977 (Trondhjems mekaniske Værksted, Trondheim, Norway)	1989–1994	6,918 GT	Scrapped at Aliağa Ship Breaking Yard in 2013
Sylbe	1971 (D.W. Kremer Sohn, Elmshorn, Germany)	1990–1993	2,510 GT	Scrapped at Aliağa Ship Breaking Yard in 2012
Beauport	1970 (Schiffbau Gesellschaft Unterweser, Bremerhaven, Germany)	1992–1993	5,464 GT	Scrapped at Aliağa Ship Breaking Yardd in 2005
Purbeck	1978 (Société Nouvelle des Ateliers et Chantiers du Havre, Le Havre, France)	1994	6,507 GT	Laid up 2017. Sank off Puerto La Cruz on 31 December 2018. Scrapped 2023

Throughout its years of operation the company also chartered a number of Brittany Ferries vessels for use during refit periods. These included the Armorique, Coutances and Duchesse Anne; and also the Cornouailles, (the previous name of Havelet), Reine Mathilde (the previous name of Beauport) and Purbeck before they became part of the BCIF fleet in 1989, 1992 and 1994 respectively.

== Routes ==
- (United Kingdom) Portsmouth - (Jersey) (Guernsey) Channel Islands 1985-1988
- (United Kingdom) Weymouth - (Jersey) (Guernsey) Channel Islands 1987-1988
- (United Kingdom) Poole - (Jersey) (Guernsey) Channel Islands 1989–1994

== Former BCIF routes today ==
British Channel Island Ferries passenger services were taken over by Condor Ferries in 1994. The Havelet operated a conventional passenger service with the company until late 1996 when she was laid up. She would later re-enter service with Condor after reliability problems with the Condor Express and demands from Islanders for a reliable winter service. Havelet was eventually replaced by the Commodore Clipper which returned conventional Channel Island services to Portsmouth in 1999. The Purbeck spent a short time with Commodore Ferries before being chartered out to a variety of companies including Brittany Ferries on a number of occasions. She remained under the ownership of Channel Island Ferries until she was sold to Interisland Line in 2003 and later a South American company in early 2007.

Condor Ferries established a fast ferry service from Poole in 1997 and would go on to maintain a summer service to the Islands and St Malo from the port until 2025.

Corbière House (located on New Quay Road), the Poole headquarters of the company until its demise still retains a BCIF style sign to this day, one of the few reminders of the company's time at the port.
