= MV Duc de Normandie =

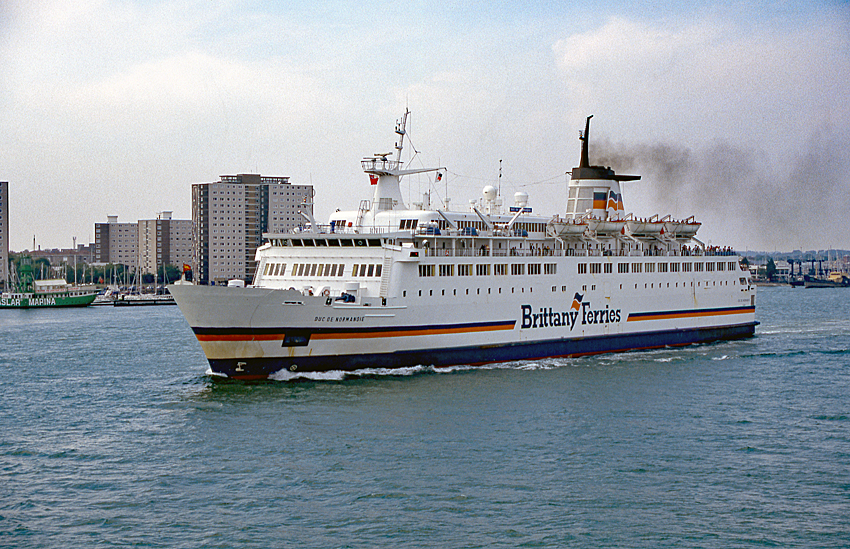
- Duc de Normandie departing Portsmouth

History
- Name: 1978–1986: Prinses Beatrix; 1986–2005: Duc de Normandie; 2005–2013: Wisteria; 2013–2021: Vronskiy; 2021: Damla
- Operator: 1978–1986: SMZ; 1986–2005: Brittany Ferries; 2005–2006: TransEuropa Ferries; 2006–2021: Ferrimaroc and Acciona Trasmediterránea
- Port of registry: 1978–1986: Hook of Holland, (Netherlands); 1986–2005: Caen (France); 2005–2021: Limmasol (Cyprus); 2021–Present: Belize
- Builder: Verolme Scheepswerf Heusden, the Netherlands
- Launched: 14 January 1978
- In service: 29 June 1978
- Out of service: 2020
- Identification: IMO number: 7637149
- Fate: Dismantled February 2021

General characteristics
- Tonnage: 9,356 GRT; 13,505 GT (after remeasurement)
- Length: 131 m (429.8 ft)
- Beam: 22 m (72.2 ft)
- Installed power: 16,182 kW
- Speed: 21 kn (38.9 km/h)
- Capacity: 1500 passengers; 350 cars

MV Duc de Normandie was a passenger car ferry built in 1978 as the Prinses Beatrix. She subsequently operated under the names Wisteria, Vronskiy and Damla.

== History ==
She was built in 1978 as the Prinses Beatrix by Verolme Shipyard, in Heusden, the Netherlands and worked for Stoomvaart Maatschappij Zeeland on its joint Sealink route between Hook of Holland and Harwich, Parkeston Quay. She was named and launched by Princess Beatrix on 14 January 1978. Brittany Ferries bought the vessel on 1 October 1985 and, after chartering the vessel for a year back to SMZ, renamed her Duc de Normandie, operating between Portsmouth and Ouistreham from 5 June 1986. The ferry sailed alongside Reine Mathilde on its favoured route to Ouistreham. On 10 July 2002, she was transferred to the Plymouth-Roscoff route, replacing the Quiberon. She ended her Brittany Ferries career on this route, her final sailing being on 30 September 2004.

Brittany Ferries sold her in 2005 to TransEuropa Ferries, operating between Port of Ramsgate and Ostend under the name Wisteria. In 2006 she was chartered to Ferrimaroc and Acciona Trasmeditarranea for use on their Almeria (Spain) to Nador (Morocco) route.

The vessel sailed on the Nador-Almeria route until September 2013 under the name Vronskiy, where it had operated till 2008 during the summer-season while Transeuropa Ferries operated it on the Oostend-Ramsgate route during the rest of the year. Until 2013 the owner of the ship was Wisteria Hawthorn Shipping but after TEF went bankrupt in April 2013 it was sold to Nizhniy Shipping, which renamed it Vronskiy, although the existing charter to Acciona was continued. The Vronskiy then operated on the route Algeciras–Tanger except during the high-summer season when she operated the Nador-Almeria route.

== In the media ==
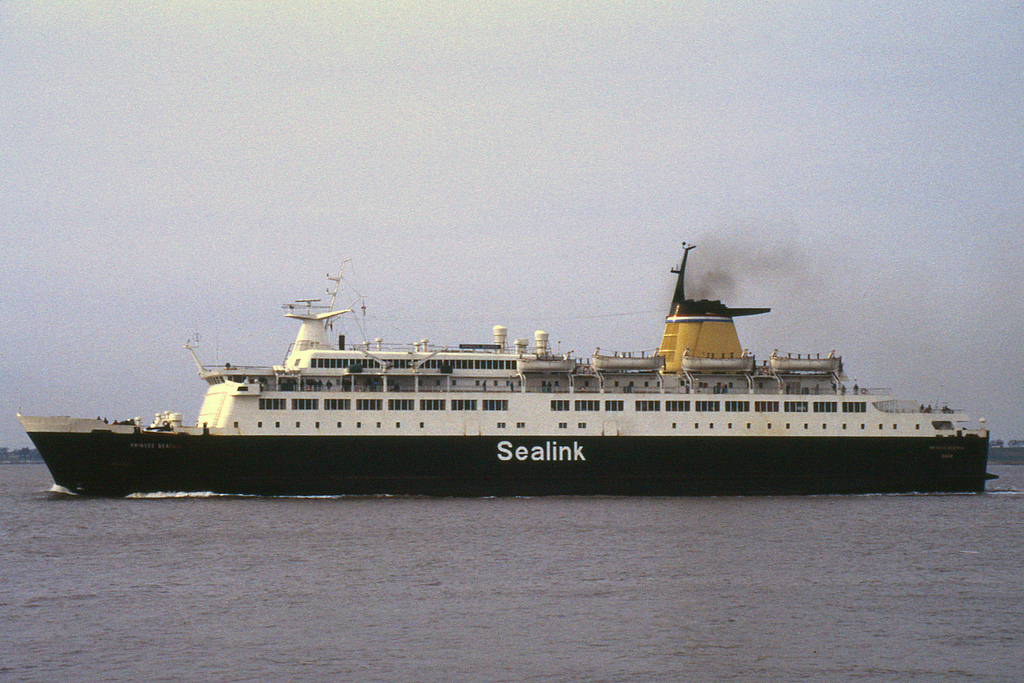
As Prinses Beatrix

Prinses Beatrix is visible during the opening credits of the first series of the British comedy-drama Auf Wiedersehen, Pet.
