= FerriMaroc =

Moroccan ferry company

- Founded: November 1994
- Fate: Acquired by Acciona Trasmediterránea
- Headquarters: Nador, Morocco
- Area served: Port of Almeria (Spain), Nador Port (Morocco)
- Services: Passenger transportation, freight transportation
- Parent: Acciona Trasmediterránea
- Website: www.trasmediterranea.es

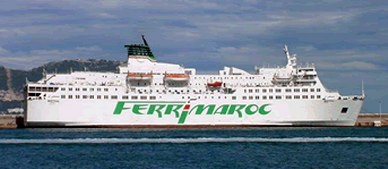
MS Mistral Express on Almeria-Nador route (2008)

FerriMaroc was a Moroccan ferry company which started services between Nador Port in Morocco and the Port of Almeria in Spain. Since 2010 the company has been part of the Spanish operator Acciona Trasmediterránea.

== History ==
In 1994, the company was the launch-operator as ferry operator on the route to/from the Port of Nador in Beni Ansar near Nador in Morocco. Until that date one could only sail to the port of Melilla, which is in the same basin as the port of Nador.

== Fleet ==
Since the acquisition of FerriMaroc by Acciona the company has no fleet of its own, but over the years a range of ships have sailed for the company: sometimes painted in FerriMaroc livery, sometimes in either neutral colors or using the livery of the operator from whom a ship was leased.

The former MS Wisteria (former: Prinses Beatrix) (which should not be confused with the ship of the same name from 1975) is sailing on the Nador-Almeria route until 15 September 2013 under the name M/G Vronskiy. Before the long-term charter in 2008 this ship had been sailing on this route during the summer season and in the rest of the year Transeuropa Ferries operated it on their Oostend-Ramsgate route. Until 2013, the owner of the ship was Wisteria Hawthorn Shipping Co. but after Transeuropa became bankrupt in April 2013 it was sold to Nizhniy Shipping Ltd. who renamed it M/F Vronskiy, though the existing lease/charter to Acciona was continued. The Vronskiy is being used on the route Algeciras - Tanger except during the high summer season when she will sail the Nador-Almeria route.

=== Past and present fleet ===
Name	Built	Sailing for FerriMaroc	Source
MV Scirocco	1974	1993, 1994–2004	FerrySite M/F Sara 3
MV Mistral aka MV Mistral Express	1981	1997–2005, 2005	FerrySite M/F Mistral Express
MV Normandy	1981	2008 (summer)	FerrySite M/F Normandy
MV Isabella I	1981	2013 (summer)	FerrySite M/F Isabella I
MV Wisteria	1978	2005 (summer), 2006 (summer), 2008–?	FerrySite M/F Vronskiy; History Wisteria
MV Sherbatskiy	1980	2012–?	FerrySite M/F Sherbatskiy
