= Compagnie Marocaine de Navigation =

Moroccan shipping company

Comanav
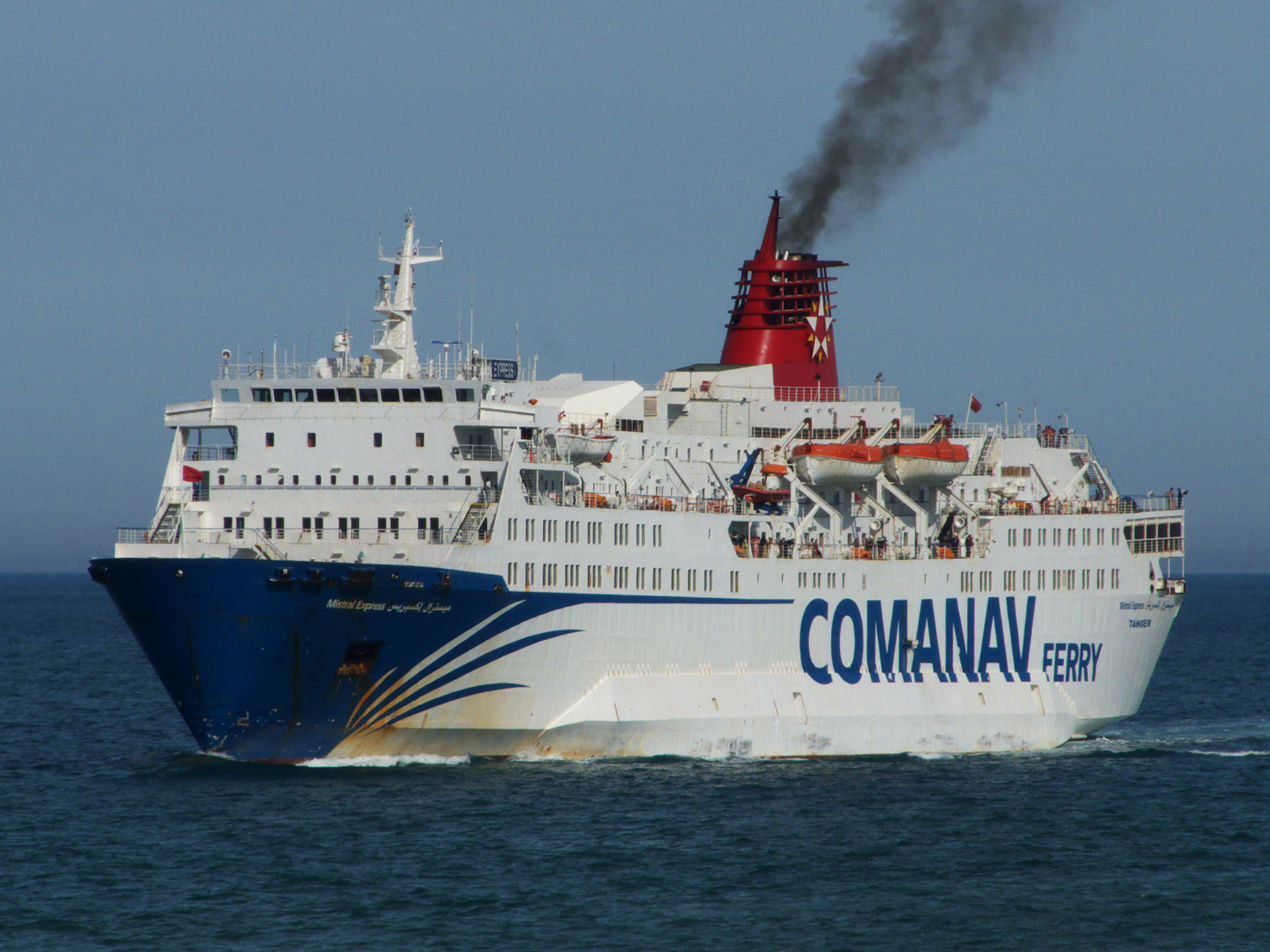
- Type: Subsidiary
- Industry: Transport
- Founded: 1946
- Headquarters: Casablanca, Morocco
- Key people: Taoufik Ibrahimi (PDG)
- Products: Ferries; Port services Passenger transportation Freight transportation
- Parent: CMA CGM
- Website: www.cma-cgm.com

The Compagnie Marocaine de Navigation or Comanav (Arabic: الشركة المغربية للملاحة البحرية; Moroccan Navigation Company) is a Moroccan shipping company and wholly owned subsidiary of CMA CGM. Currently, it is the leader in the Moroccan market for maritime transport of passengers and freight, as well as port operations. In 2009, the company sold its ferries and passenger transport subdivision to Comarit which has since gone bankrupt.

== History ==
The house flag used by CFCN when Morocco was a French protectorate and Comanav in independent Morocco.

Compagnie Franco-Chérifienne de Navigation (CFCN) was founded in 1946. After the independence of Morocco in 1956, it changed its name to Comanav in 1959.

For the numerous Moroccan emigrants in Europe who returned to the country for the summer, the company decided in 1975 to offer a passenger ferry line between Tangiers and Sète. In the same year, it acquired five container ships to pursue its development along with its bulk carriers.

In 1993, a roll-on/roll-off (ro-ro) increased the companies capacity for the transport of lorries.

Five years later, Comanav became the first Moroccan shipowner to serve the Straits of Gibraltar, strengthening its position in the field of passenger transport in the Mediterranean region.

In 2007, the Moroccan state privatised the company, which was leased to a consortium represented by CMA CGMM for 2.2 billion Moroccan dirhams, equivalent to 200 million euros. The French company was interested above all in the port sector and yielded the passenger business to the Spanish company Balearia, which itself sold its share to a Moroccan operator, Comarit, for a sum of 80 million euros in February 2009.

== Activities ==
- Bulk transport
- Passenger transport
- Container transport
- Ro-Ro
- Port activities (Somaport, Tanger Med,...)

== Some statistics ==
Comanav's fleet consists of 14 vessels of which 10 are owned. Its capacity is for 3,300 teu, 7,400 passengers and 2,200 vehicles. Volumes transported annually are 60,000 teu, 45,000 units Ro-Ro, 200,000 tonnes of various goods and 800,000 passengers.

== Regular links ==
=== Principal services (cargo) ===
- Atlantic: Morocco Casablanca France Le Havre France Rouen France Dunkirk Belgium Antwerp Netherlands Rotterdam
- Western Mediterranean: Morocco Casablanca Spain Valencia Spain Barcelona Italy La Spezia
- Ro-Ro lines:
  - Morocco Casablanca France Marseille
  - Morocco Casablanca Spain Cádiz
  - Morocco Casablanca Italy La Spezia Italy Genoa

=== Principal services (passengers) ===
- Morocco Tangier:
  - Spain: Algeciras
  - France: Sète
  - Italy: Genoa
- Morocco Nador:
  - Spain: Almería
  - France: Sète

== Sources ==
- Comanav official website
- CMA-CGM official website
