= Port of Poole =

English cross channel port

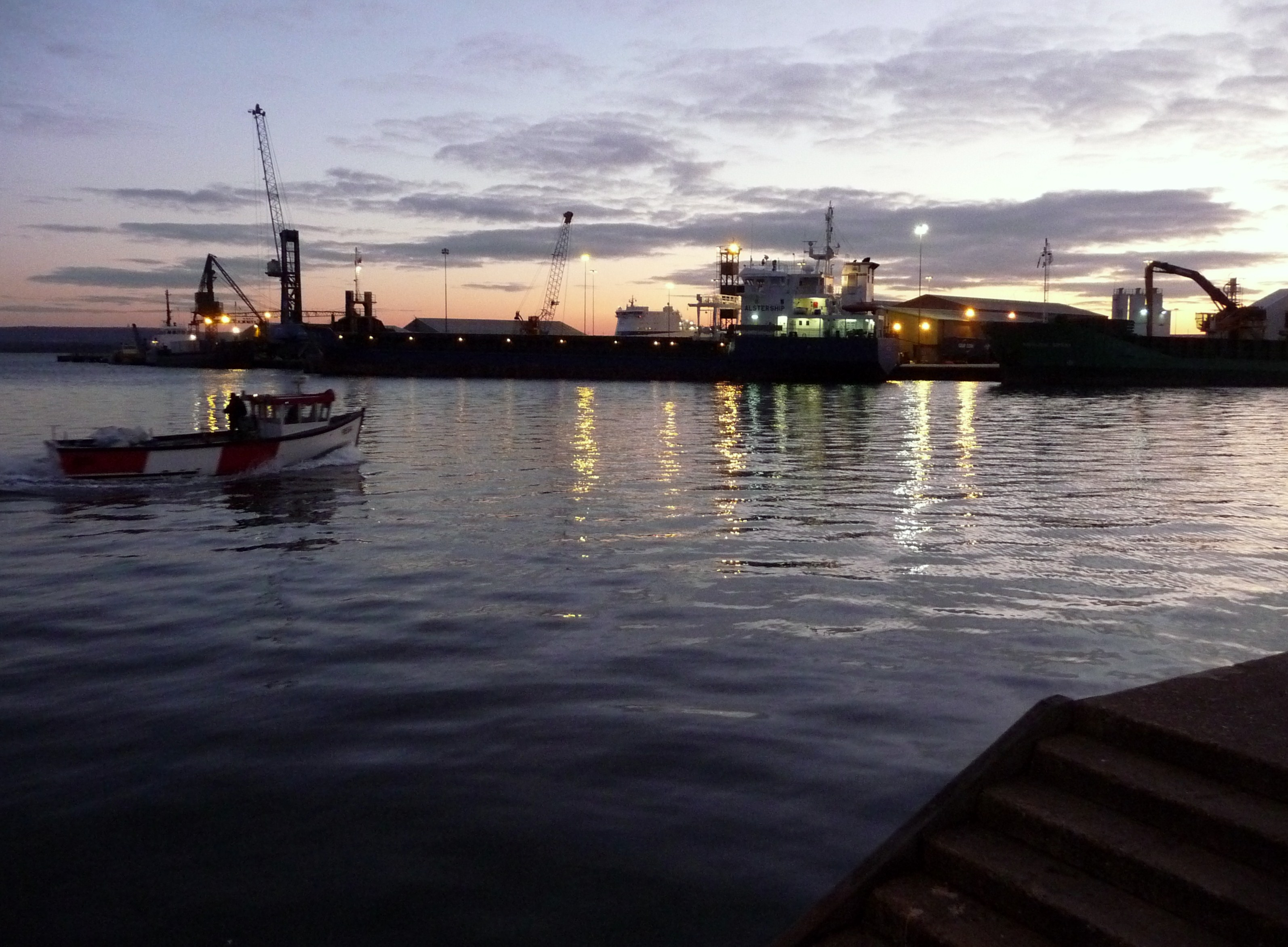
The Port of Poole

The Port of Poole is a cross channel port on Poole Harbour in Poole, Dorset, South West England. Along with Weymouth Harbour, Poole has the other major Channel Port in Dorset.

== History ==
In World War II, the port was used in the Normandy landings.

In the late 1960s, Poole Harbour Commissioners were considering the option of establishing a terminal for a freight ferry service between Poole and Cherbourg to take advantage of the shortest distance between England and France, west of Dover (64 nautical miles). Reclamation work for the land the terminal was to be built on was commenced in 1971 with completion due two years later.

Truckline Ferries services launched on 29 June 1973 with a crossing by the French-built Poole Antelope (named after a pub on Poole High Street) from Cherbourg to Poole. The ship and the company were the first RORO ferry to use the new terminal at Poole and the opening of this part of the port helped to address the increasing conflict between the tourist popularity of Poole Quay and the commercial shipping needs of the port.

Over the first ten years since completion of the freight ferry terminal, freight volumes expanded considerably. In 1973, Truckline carried 2,324 lorries and by 1982 the figure was reported to be over 62,000 lorries and an additional 20,000 Italian car imports. This large increase in traffic, along with an unfortunate incident in September 1980 when the linkspan at was damaged to the point of being unusable after a collision between it and Countances, which lost power on docking, leaving both damaged and seeing Truckline services temporarily switch to Weymouth until the linkspan could be repaired, prompted Poole Harbour Commissioners to expand the ferry port to 44 acres, with a further a 10m wide linkspan, opened in October 1984.

In July 1985, Brittany Ferries announced they had purchased Truckline Ferries for an undisclosed amount, resulting in an immediate £3.5 million cash injection to develop the service further. This resulted in two major moves by the company; the first to 'jumboize' the freight ships Coutances and Purbeck, the second being to introduce a new passenger service under the Truckline brand during the summer season from June 1986, which was to become the first cross channel passenger ferry service from Poole.

After much speculation, British Channel Island Ferries announced in August 1988 its decision to focus services on the port of Poole from 2 January 1989, allowing them to reduce crossing times to the islands by up to two hours, resulting in the curtailment of their services from Portsmouth and Weymouth on 2 January 1989 and 1 October 1988 respectively.

The continued growth of both Truckline and the port at Poole resulted in a further expansion of the port. This was undertaken during 1989 with further land reclamations taking the total terminal area to 60 acres and included a third linkspan. The expansion was opened in April 1990 by former employment secretary Sir Norman Fowler.

Brittany Ferries ordered two new ships in 1990, one of which was for Truckline services and during construction was lengthened to cater for increasing passenger numbers. This ferry eventually sailed as Barfleur to Poole for the first time in April 1992, becoming the largest ferry ever to dock at the port and requiring substantial dredging of the main access channel to facilitate access, along with construction of an upper deck to one of the Poole linkspans to accommodate the new ship. This record stood until 2007 when this record was surpassed by Bretagne and then again in 2010 by Armorique.

In January 1994 it was announced that due to substantial losses, British Channel Island Ferries had been bought by Commodore Shipping. Freight services were transferred to Commodore Ferries at Portsmouth, and passenger operations moved to Condor Ferries at Weymouth, operations of under the BCIF name would cease on 22 January 1994, with around 100 staff being made redundant from that date. The move away from Poole by Condor resulted in a long-running legal battle with Poole Harbour Commissioners, who claimed the move at short notice broke a ten year contract with BCIF, which resulted in the loss of 35 jobs at the port. The deal, signed in 1989, had been worth £300,000 per year to the port. The commissioners had claimed £4 million damages from Condor, although an undisclosed settlement was reached between the two parties days before a court hearing in June 1996.

In 2017, a D-Day veteran and the last known Mark 4 landing craft tank, LCT 728, was rediscovered rotting in Poole Harbour at the Port alongside another unknown Mark 3, possibly LCT(4) 510. They were used as floating barges in the 1950s.

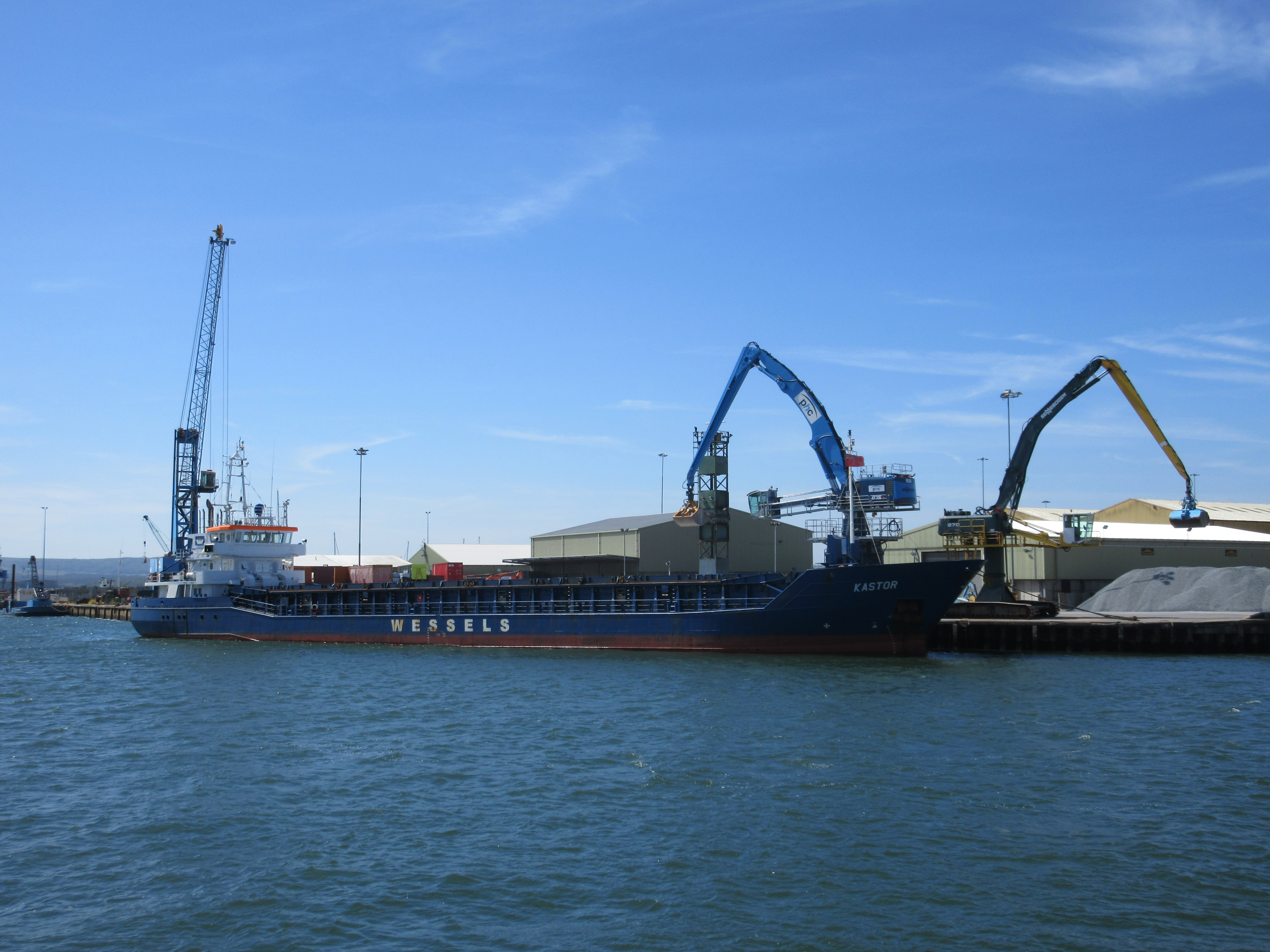
A cargo ship at the Port of Poole in May 2019.

In November 2020, the Port set up a flu vaccination service and also received £86,000 for the Brexit transition period.

In December 2020, it was reported by BBC News that Bournemouth, Christchurch and Poole Council is preparing a bid for free Port status post Brexit. The bid for becoming a special economic zone includes Bournemouth Airport.

In April 2021, the port set up equipment at the cruise terminal to deal with the COVID-19 pandemic.

In November 2023, work was finished at a £2.2m border control post at the Port of Poole.

In the summer of 2020, the Cherbourg services were cancelled due to the COVID-19 pandemic, but the service was later revived in 2022. In June 2026, Brittany Ferries announced that Barfleur and fleet-mate Cotentin were to be sold, and the Poole–Cherbourg route would close from November 2026.

On 12 October 2026 at 08:30 BST, Barfleur set sail on her final crossing to Cherbourg from Poole. This had originally been scheduled for 2 November 2026, but the service ended earlier than planned so Barfleur could cover for Commodore Clipper on the Cherbourg to Rosslare route, due to the latter suffering a gearbox failure which also saw the early curtailment of the Portsmouth–Le Havre route on 22 September 2026.

== Services ==
The Port is used by Brittany Ferries and DFDS Seaways. The ferry crossing to Cherbourg in France was the shortest crossing of Brittany Ferries until the company acquired Condor Ferries in 2025, making the weekly Guernsey to Jersey route the shortest crossing, lasting 1 hour.

Below is a list of the current routes operated out of Poole port (as of October 2026):

Ferry Operator	Destination	Average Duration of Crossing	Frequency	Vessel
Brittany Ferries	St Peter Port, Guernsey	3hrs	Up to 6 times a week	Voyager
Brittany Ferries	St Malo, France	6hrs (via Guernsey)	Up to 6 times a week	Voyager
DFDS Seaways	St Helier, Jersey	4hrs 30mins	Up to 6 times a week (seasonal)	Levante Jet

Poole Port also has a Border Force Post.

== Transportation ==
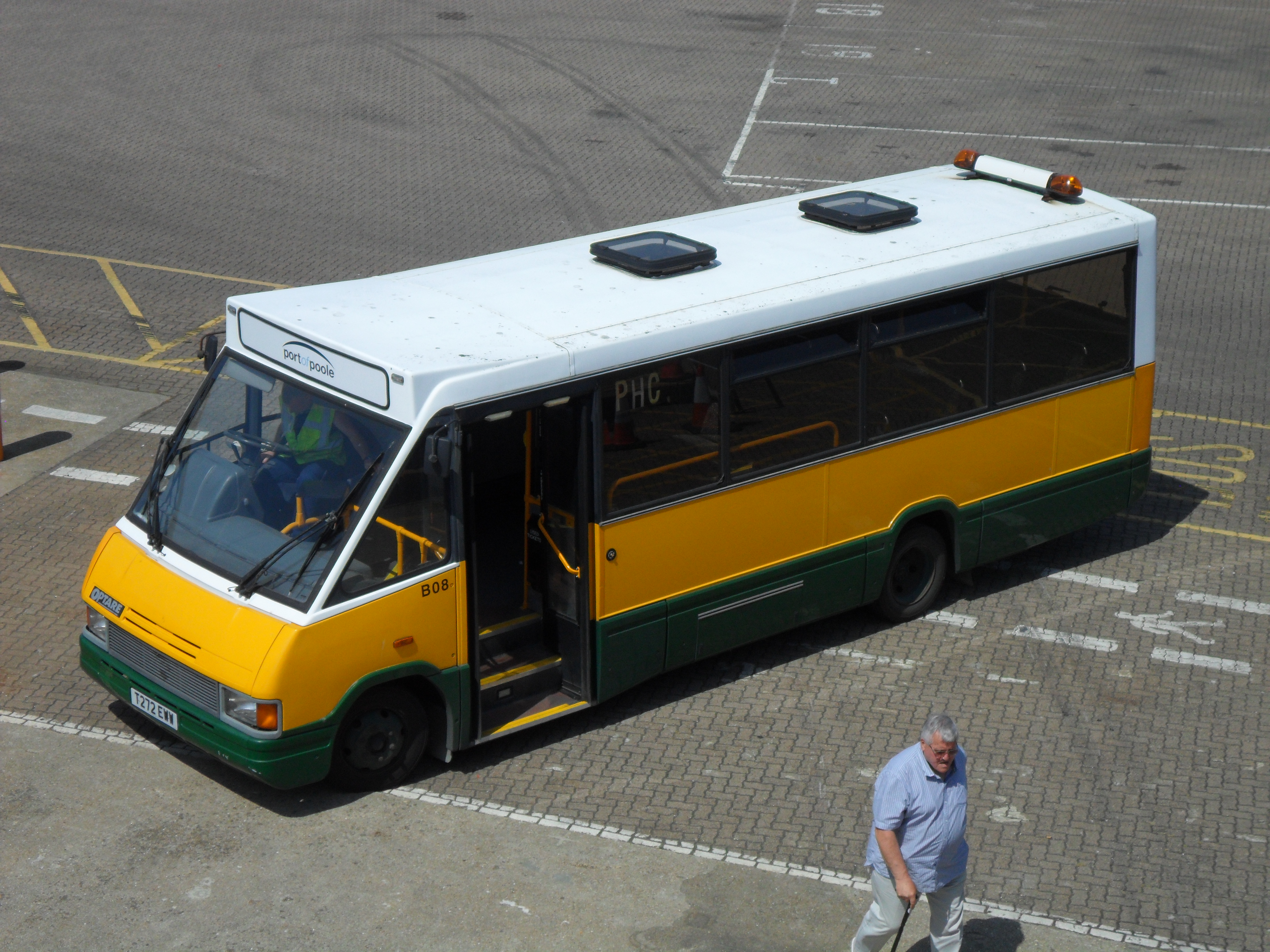
A Optare MetroRider at the Port of Poole in 2013.

The Port of Poole uses Optare MetroRiders for passengers commuting.

== Economy ==
The Port of Poole is a major destination the cruising, as well as for international trade for imports and exports of cargo. A fishing industry is also present.

== Immigration ==
It has been reported that the Port of Poole is a target for Illegal immigration to the United Kingdom. In 2017, 18 migrants were found including children in a lorry. In 2019, the then local MP for Poole, Robert Syms called on the government and the Minister of State for Immigration to provide more resources to deal with the issue. The Port has a border control post.
