= MV Saint-Malo =

French Ro-Pax ferry built in 2024

- Saint-Malo in its namesake port

History
- Name: 2024–present: Saint-Malo
- Namesake: Named after the city of Saint-Malo
- Owner: 2024–2026: Stena RoRo; 2026–present: Brittany Ferries
- Operator: 2024–present: Brittany Ferries
- Port of registry: 2024–present: Morlaix, France
- Route: Saint-Malo – Portsmouth
- Ordered: 26 February 2021
- Builder: China Merchants Jinling Shipyard; Weihai, China
- Yard number: W0278
- Laid down: 29 June 2023
- Launched: 7 October 2023
- Christened: 31 January 2025
- Completed: October 2024
- Acquired: 15 October 2024
- Maiden voyage: 12 February 2025
- In service: 2025
- Identification: IMO number: 9946336; Call sign: FMYH; MMSI number: 228457700
- Status: in service
- Notes: Sister ship to MV Guillaume de Normandie

General characteristics
- Class & type: Stena E-Flexer Class (Hybrid LNG Subclass)
- Tonnage: 36,721 GT; 5,495 DWT
- Length: 194.70 m (638 ft 9 in)
- Beam: 27.80 m (91 ft 2 in)
- Draught: 6.50 m (21 ft 4 in)
- Depth: 9.65 m (31 ft 8 in)
- Decks: 10
- Ramps: Bow and stern loading ramps
- Installed power: 2 × Wärtsilä 12V46DF dual-fuel (LNG / MDO) main engines (total 27,480 kW / 36,850 hp); Battery hybrid propulsion system & cold-ironing (shore power connection) capability
- Propulsion: 2 × controllable pitch propellers
- Speed: 23.0 knots (42.6 km/h; 26.5 mph) (service)
- Capacity: 1 290 passengers (387 cabins); 550 cars / 2 514 lane metres for freight
- Crew: 90–110

MV Saint-Malo is an E-Flexer-class Ro-Pax ferry operated by Brittany Ferries. The design is modified compared to earlier ships of the same class, and slightly smaller than the standard design, at 36,721 GT. Saint-Malo typically sails on the route between Saint-Malo and Portsmouth.

She was built at the China Merchants Jinling Shipyard, Weihai.
