= E-Flexer-class ferry =

Class of Ro-Pax ferries

E-Flexer class
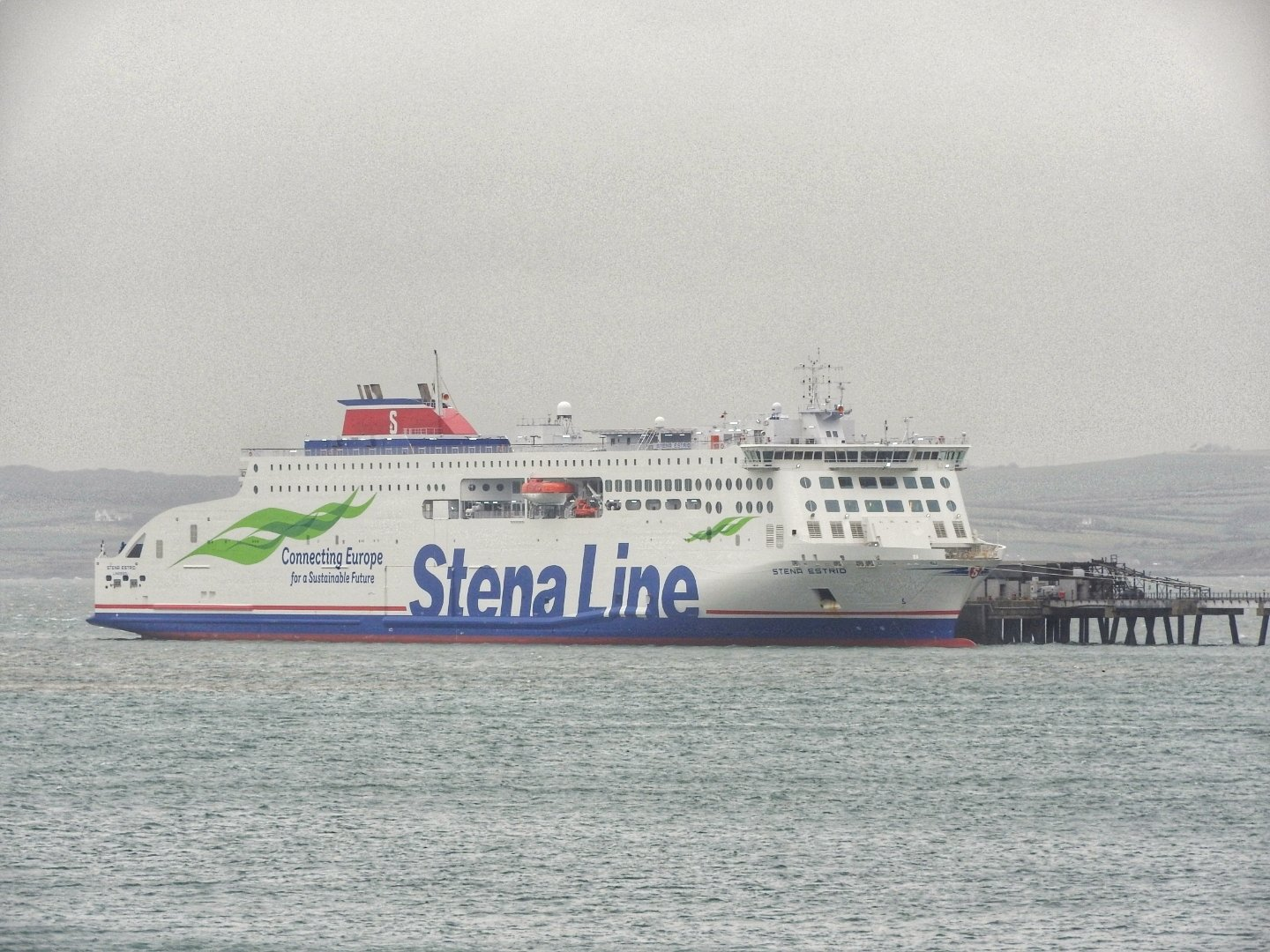
- Stena Estrid at Holyhead

Class overview
- Builders: China Merchants Jinling Shipyard, Weihai, China
- Operators: Stena Line; Brittany Ferries; DFDS Seaways; Corsica Linea (future); Marine Atlantic
- Built: 2018-present
- In service: 2020–present
- Planned: 15
- Completed: 12

General characteristics
- Type: Ropax ferry
- Tonnage: 38,000 GT-45,000 GT
- Length: 194.7–240 m (638 ft 9 in – 787 ft 5 in)
- Beam: 28.00 m (91 ft 10 in)
- Decks: 10
- Deck clearance: 5.1 m (16 ft 9 in)
- Installed power: 2 × MaK M43C diesels/Wärtsilä 12V46DF dual-fuel engines; combined 25,200–27,480 kW (33,790–36,850 hp)
- Speed: 22–23 knots (41–43 km/h; 25–26 mph)
- Capacity: 1,000–1,300 passengers; Vehicle capacity variable; 2,100–3,600 lanemeters

The E-Flexer is a class of Chinese-built Ro-Pax ferries ordered by Stena RoRo for European line service. There are twelve vessels that have been built; they are operated by Stena Line, Brittany Ferries, DFDS Seaways and Marine Atlantic. There are three vessels on order and upon delivery, they will be operated by Corsica Linea and Attica Group. Stena Line took five vessels of the class, Brittany Ferries five (four powered by LNG, two of which are also hybrid electric), and a single vessel each to DFDS and Marine Atlantic, of which the latter's vessel is also hybrid electric. All of the vessels were delivered to Stena RoRo with the Stena Line vessels transferred to that company and the Brittany Ferries, DFDS and Marine Atlantic examples long-term chartered to those operators, with an option to purchase at the end of the charter.

== History ==
Following about two years of design work, Stena ordered the first four vessels of the class from Chinese shipbuilder AVIC Weihai (now China Merchants Jinling Shipyard) in April 2016, with options for four more ships. Stena originally planned to utilize the four ferries on Irish Sea services out of Belfast, but later agreed to charter the third ship in the series to Brittany Ferries. In February 2018, the keel was laid for the first ship, with her delivery scheduled for early 2020. Stena RoRo ordered a fifth ship in April 2018, which will enter service with DFDS Seaways on a ten-year charter upon delivery. The following month, Stena RoRo ordered a sixth ship, to be placed with Brittany Ferries on a ten-year charter beginning in late 2021. Construction on the second ship in the class began in June 2018. In July, Stena Line ordered two more ships, accounting for all the options in the original 2016 order, while Stena RoRo announced that it had agreed to take new options for four more vessels.

=== Service ===
The first ship in the class, named Stena Estrid, was launched in January 2019 and was delivered in China on 15 November. On arrival in Holyhead, faulty seals on over 20 windows were discovered. Repairs were carried out prior to her maiden voyage, which took place on 13 January 2020. She is regularly operated on Stena's route between Holyhead and Dublin.

Stena Edda, the second E-flexer earmarked for Stena Line's fleet, was delivered to Stena RoRo on 15 January 2020. Following bunkering in Singapore and Gibraltar, and an outside port limits call at Galle, the crew travelling from Weihai were also checked by local authorities for coronavirus infection, with no evidence of the disease being present. She entered service on Stena's route between Belfast and Birkenhead, where Stena Embla, the third ship of the series, is planned to operate upon her delivery in early 2021.

Galicia was delivered on 3 September 2020, with her entry into service in 2021. She operates out of Portsmouth, England, to Santander, Spain and Cherbourg, France. Brittany Ferries took delivery of Salamanca in 2022, followed by Santoña in 2023. On 20 July 2021, Brittany Ferries announced that 2 more E-Flexer ships are due to enter service between 2024 and 2025, replacing Bretagne and Normandie. These two vessels, named Saint Malo and Guillaume de Normandie will be shortened to about 195 m (639 ft 9 in) in order to comply with St. Malo port restrictions, are due to operate between Portsmouth and St. Malo (codename Bretagne II) and Portsmouth and Caen/Ouistreham (codename Normandie II). These will be ships 11 and 12.

The fifth ship in the series, operated by DFDS, is called Côte d'Opale. She differs significantly from the other E-Flexer vessels as she has additional public spaces in areas where passenger cabins are located on the Stena Line and Brittany Ferries ships. The drastic changes from the rest of the E-Flexer class come about from the fact that she is running on the Dover–Calais cross-channel service, which is a short crossing - only taking 90 minutes from Dover to Calais. On 4 August 2021, the Côte d'Opale entered service, replacing DFDS's older 1991 Boelwerf-built Calais Seaways.

The day after Brittany Ferries ordered two additional E-Flexers, Marine Atlantic ordered an E-Flexer. This vessel will be slightly shorter than the standard E-Flexer at 202.9 m (665 ft 8 in) and will run on Marine Atlantic's two routes, connecting the North Sydney-Port aux Basques–Argentia triangle.

In mid-2024 two other ferries, intended for Attica Group, were ordered for delivery in 2027, with the option for a further two hulls.

== Design ==
E-Flexer-class ships were designed by Stena and Deltamarin, and built in China by China Merchants Shipyards (formerly part of AVIC). The basic concept of the E-Flexer follows a standardised design using (by default configuration) one full passenger deck, two mixed use decks, and two full-length garages for road traffic, plus a smaller garage in the ship's lower hull. Ships of the class are powered by two engines instead of four, which is said to reduce fuel consumption alongside a specialised hull design. The standard design is 214.5 m (703 ft 9 in) long by 27.8 m (91 ft 2 in) wide, however the design can be lengthened and shortened, and the interior can be tailored according to the operator's needs.

The first five ships to be built are each powered by two MaK M43C diesel engines, with a total power output of 25,200 kilowatts (33,800 hp), driving two propellers that give the ships a service speed of 22 knots (41 km/h; 25 mph). Those engines are designed to be compatible with liquefied natural gas (LNG) fuel after modifications. Brittany Ferries' second and third (Salamanca and Santoña) ships will be modified to be capable of running on LNG from delivery, though both will have reduced freight capacity as a result of the space occupied by their LNG tanks. All of the E-Flexer ships ordered to date will be ice-classed, either to 1A or 1C requirements.

=== Subclasses ===
==== Stena Line (standard) ====
The standard "Stenas", ships #1-#3 (Stena Estrid, Stena Edda and Stena Embla), are the first ships of E-Flexers delivered, with all being delivered between 2019 and 2020. They have a fully-passenger Deck 8 (upper deck) and partial passenger Deck 7. Deck 7 houses a restaurant overlooking the bow of the ship, with a car garage to the stern. Deck 8 houses numerous amenities at the bow, with the stern section housing passenger cabins.

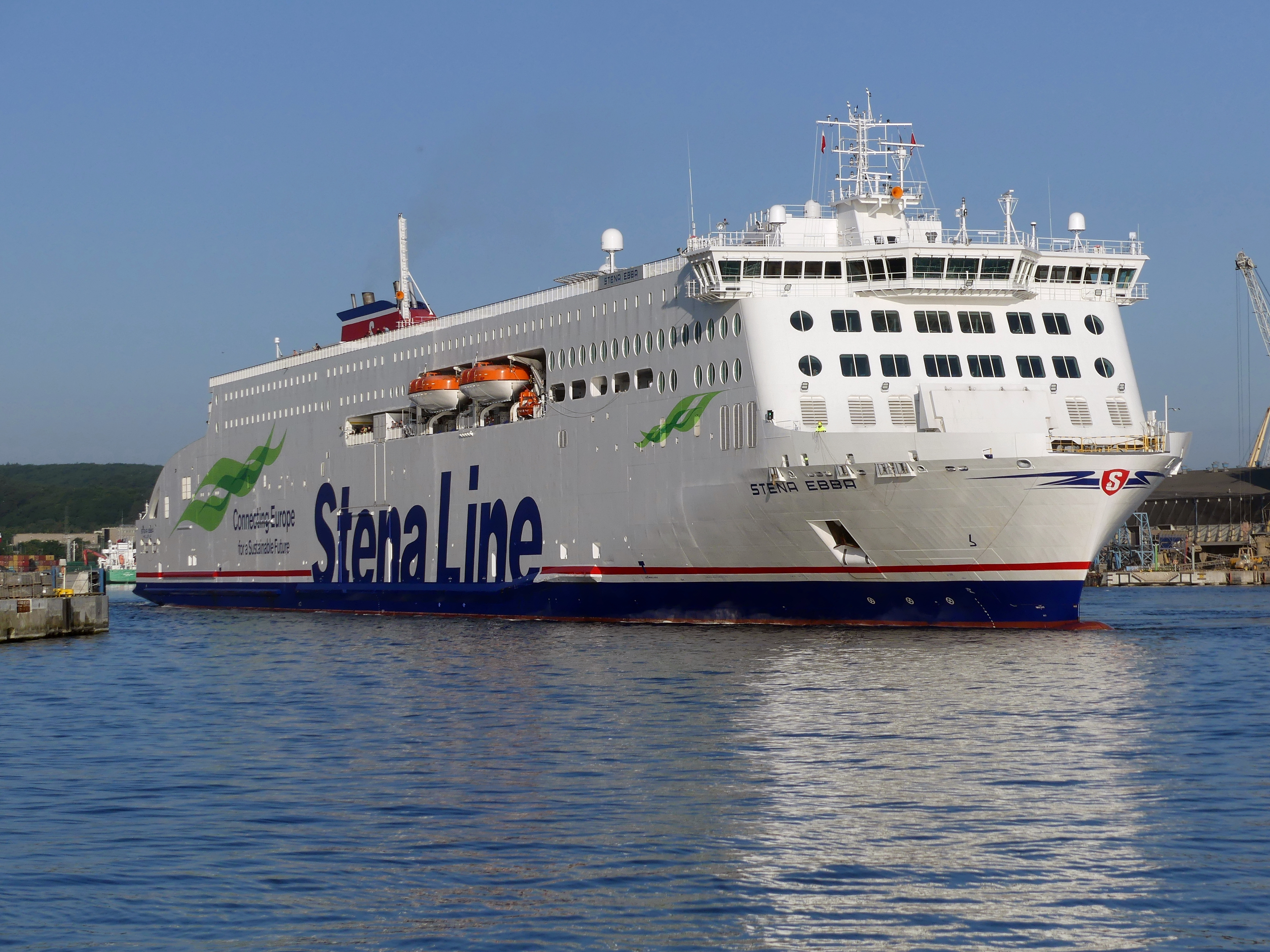
Stena Ebba, (E-Flexer extended variant) at Gdynia

==== Stena Line (extended) ====
The extended "Stenas" are ships #7 and #8 (Stena Estelle, Stena Ebba) of the class. These ships follow much the same layout as the original standard-length Stena E-Flexers; however, these are extended to 240 m (787 ft 5 in) long. With the extension in the ship's length, lane space is increased by 500 lane metres (lm) to 3,600 lm. Stena Ebba is not to be confused with Stena Edda which is smaller sister ship in the preceding standard E-Flexer class.

==== Stena Lina (E-Flexer 2.0) ====
In September 2026, Stena RoRo announced the order of two new ferries, named E-Flexer 2.0, with a length of 214 meters. The delivery of the ships intended to work between Gothenburg and Frederikshaven is planned for 2030.

==== Brittany Ferries (standard) ====
The standard Brittany Ferries (Galicia, Salamanca and Santoña) follow a very similar design to Stena Estrid, Stena Edda and Stena Embla, with the chief differences being an extended superstructure and with the Deck 7 car deck being cut in favour of passenger cabins, turning Deck 7 into a full passenger deck. Salamanca and Santoña will be capable of running on liquefied natural gas from launch, while Galicia will be able to convert at a later date. Due to LNG tanks taking up some lane metres on the latter two, lane metres on the combined two decks will be reduced from 3,100 lm to 2,758 lm.

==== Brittany Ferries (shortened) ====
Two E-Flexers (Saint-Malo and Guillaume de Normandie, christened on 28 March 2025 at Ouistreham), will be built to the shortened specification. These are shortened to 194.7 m (638 ft 9 in) length in order to comply with St. Malo harbour restrictions. Saint-Malo is due to replace the 1989 Bretagne while Guillaume de Normandie will replace the 1992 Normandie. Guillaume de Normandie will follow a similar layout to the standard Brittanies, while Saint-Malo will sacrifice additional lane metres for cabin space. Guillaume de Normandie will have some 2,100 lm of garage space, with Saint-Malo instead using 1,100 lm. Uniquely, these two ships will be hybrid electric, with capability of sailing out of harbour on 11 MWh battery electric power. Saint-Malo was delivered on 15 October 2024 and entered service on 12 February 2025. Guillaume de Normandie was delivered a few months after Saint-Malo and took over from Normandie on 18 April 2025.

==== Attica Group - Superfast Ferries ====
On 28 June 2024 it was announced that Stena RoRo had placed an order for two additional E-Flexers (ships #14 and #15) to be delivered to the Greek shipping company Attica Group (owner of the Superfast Ferries brand). These two newbuildings, as yet unnamed, will be 240 m (787 ft 5 in) long and thus share the hull with ships #7 and #8 (Stena Estelle and Stena Ebba), despite having much less lane space (3,320 to 3,600 lm). Both ships will be methanol-ready and will feature an hybrid propulsion as-built. The Attica Group and Stena RoRo agreed a 10-year bareboat charter scheme, including a purchase option as from the end of the 5th year of hire period. The ships will be delivered in April and August 2027.

=== Custom E-Flexer builds ===
==== Côte d'Opale (DFDS) ====
Côte D'Opale is one of three unique E-Flexer newbuilds. Her design sacrifices cabins completely on Deck 8 in favour of passenger amenities, alongside being outfitted with a so-called "cow catcher" on the bow and sliding doors at the rear. These changes were made in order for her to be suitable for service on the highly intensive Dover–Calais sailing, which only lasts 1 hour 30 minutes and utilises shore-to-ship ramps instead of the conventional ship-to-shore ramps used elsewhere.

==== Ala'suinu (Marine Atlantic) ====
The vessel for Marine Atlantic is the second unique E-Flexer. She, dubbed Ala'suinu (Mi'kmaq for Traveller), is a slightly shortened variant of the standard E-Flexer, though longer than the shortened Brittany ships on order, at 202.9 m (665 ft 8 in) long. She is able to carry 1,100 passengers and 2,571 lane metres of vehicle space, and, like the St. Malo Brittany Ferries ships, is capable of running on marine diesel or liquid natural gas, with hybrid electric propulsion. Like the Brittany Ferries' ships, the car deck on Deck 7 has been sacrificed for additional cabin space. The ship was delivered to Stena RoRo and Marine Atlantic on 7 February 2024.

==== Capu Rossu (Corsica Linea) ====
On 8 January 2024, it was announced that Stena RoRo had secured a contract with Corsica Linea to deliver an E-Flexer, marking the first time Stena RoRo secured a contract to deliver a ship to a Mediterranean operator. This ship will be based on the same hull form as Marine Atlantic's Ala'suinu, and by extension will measure the same at 202.9 m (665 ft 8 in) long. The new Capu Rossu will have 2,500 lane metres of rolling cargo space, 235 passenger cabins and capacity for 1,000 passengers, with LNG capability and hybrid propulsion as-built. The ship was launched in summer 2025.

==== Unbuilt E-Flexers ====
===== Interislander =====
There was also a concept for a ship of this class for Interislander (Island E-Flexer), which was never realised.

== Specifications ==
E-Flexer-class characteristics All vessels have a width of 27.8 m (91 ft 2 in)
Variant	Length	Tonnage	Propulsion	Speed	Passenger capacity	Lane metres
Stena Line (standard)	214.5 m (703 ft 9 in)	42,400 GT	2× MaK M43C diesel engines, 12,600 kW each	22 kn (25 mph)	1,000	3,100
Stena Line (lengthened)	240 m (787 ft 5 in)	~45,000 GT	2× MaK M43C diesel engines, 12,600 kW each	22 kn (25 mph)	1,200	3,600
Brittany (Galicia)	214.5 m (703 ft 9 in)	41,900 GT	2× MaK M43C diesel engines, 12,600 kW each	22 kn (25 mph)	1,015	3,100
Brittany (shortened)	194.7 m (638 ft 9 in)	~38,000 GT	2× Wärtsilä 12V46DF dual-fuel engines, 13,740 kW each plus battery electric hybrid system	23 kn (26 mph)	~1,300	2,100
Brittany (LNG)	214.5 m (703 ft 9 in)	42,000 GT	2× Wärtsilä 12V46DF dual-fuel engines, 13,740 kW each	23 kn (26 mph)	1,015	2,758
DFDS (Côte d'Opale)	214.5 m (703 ft 9 in)	40,331 GT	2× MaK M43C diesel engines, 12,600 kW each	22 kn (25 mph)	1,000	3,100
Marine Atlantic	202.9 m (665 ft 8 in)	37,807 GT	2× Wärtsilä 12V46DF dual-fuel engines, 13,740 kW each plus battery electric hybrid system	23 kn (26 mph)	1,100	2,571
Corsica Linea	202.9 m (665 ft 8 in)	TBC	2× Wärtsilä 12V46DF dual-fuel engines, 13,740 kW each plus battery electric hybrid system	23 kn (26 mph)	1,000	2,500
Superfast Ferries	239.7 m (786 ft 5 in)	TBC	TBC	24 kn (28 mph)	1,500	3,320
Stena Line (Hybrid)	214.5 m (703 ft 9 in)	TBC	TBC plus 85 MWH battery electric hybrid system	TBC	1,400	2,720
