= Economy of Tangier =

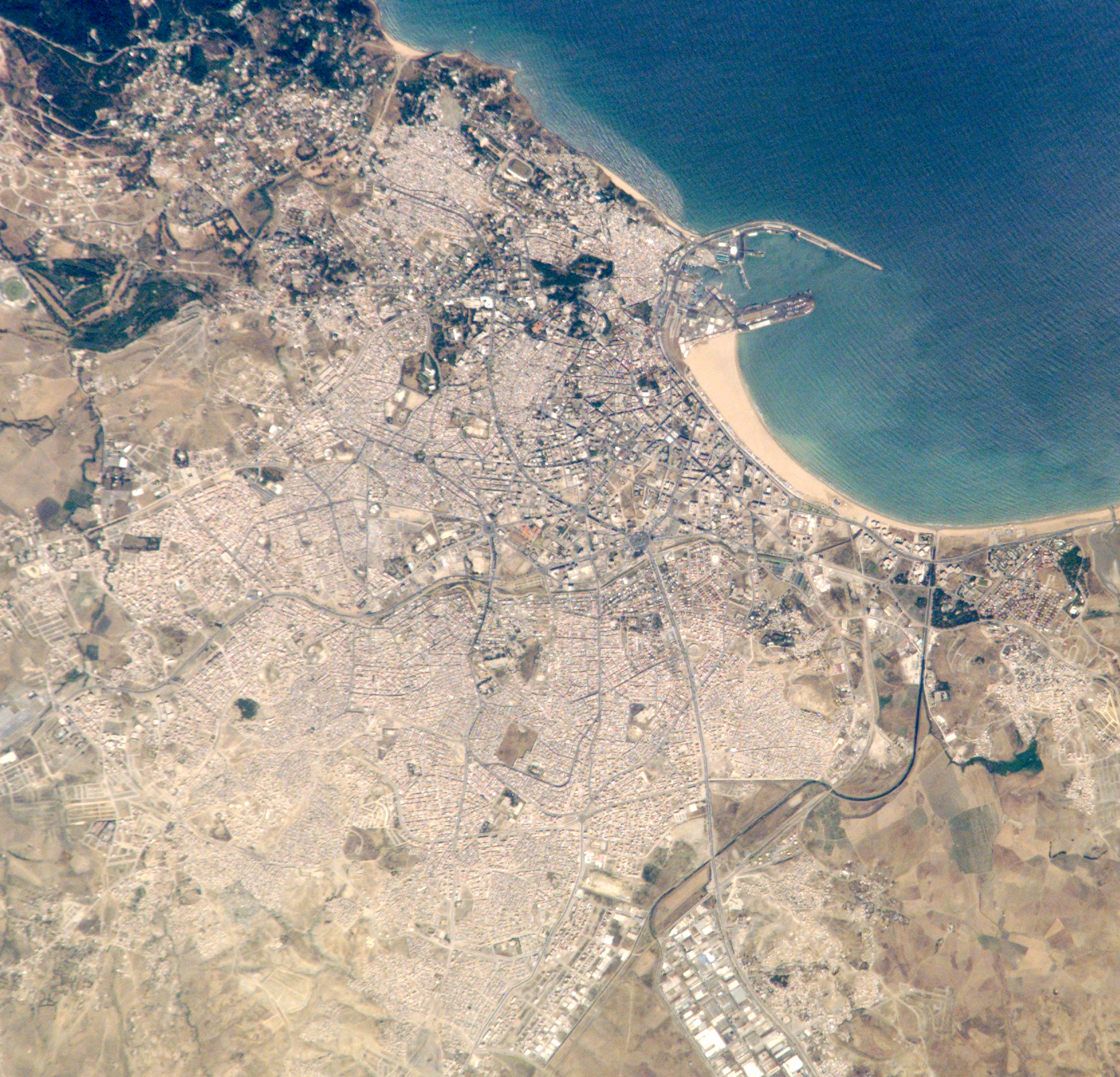
A satellite image of Tangier

Tangier's economy is the third biggest of all Moroccan cities, after the economic capital Casablanca and the city of Fez. Tangier is Morocco's second most important industrial center after Casablanca. The industrial sectors are diversified: textile, chemical, mechanical, metallurgical and naval. Currently, the city has four industrial parks of which two have the status of free economic zone (see Tangier Free Zone).

The years 2007 and 2008 will be particularly important for the city because of the completion of large construction projects currently being built. These include the Tangier-Mediterranean port ("Tanger-med") and its industrial parks, a 65,000-seat (Currently being renovated to 80,000) sports stadium, an expanded business district, and a renovated tourist infrastructure.

Agriculture in the area of Tangier is tertiary and mainly cereal. The infrastructure of this city of the strait of Gibraltar consists of a port that manages flows of goods and travellers (more than one million travelers per annum) and integrates a marina with a fishing port. Artisanal trade in the old medina (old city) specializes mainly in leather working, handicrafts made from wood and silver, traditional clothing, and shoes of Moroccan origin.

The city has seen a fast pace of rural exodus from other small cities and villages. The population has quadrupled during the last 25 years (1 million inhabitants in 2007 vs. 250,000 in 1982). This phenomenon has resulted in the appearance of peripheral suburban districts, mainly inhabited by poor people, that often lack sufficient infrastructure.

== History ==
At the turn of the 20th century, Tangier produced almost no manufactures for export. Trade included trinkets for tourists; oxen, chickens, meat, and eggs for Gibraltar and Spain; and some blankets and slippers for Egypt. It was, however, a major center for imports to its own international community, as well as northern Morocco as far as Meknes and Fez. Native tangerines were not sufficient for local consumption, and many were brought in from Tetuan.

== Tourism ==
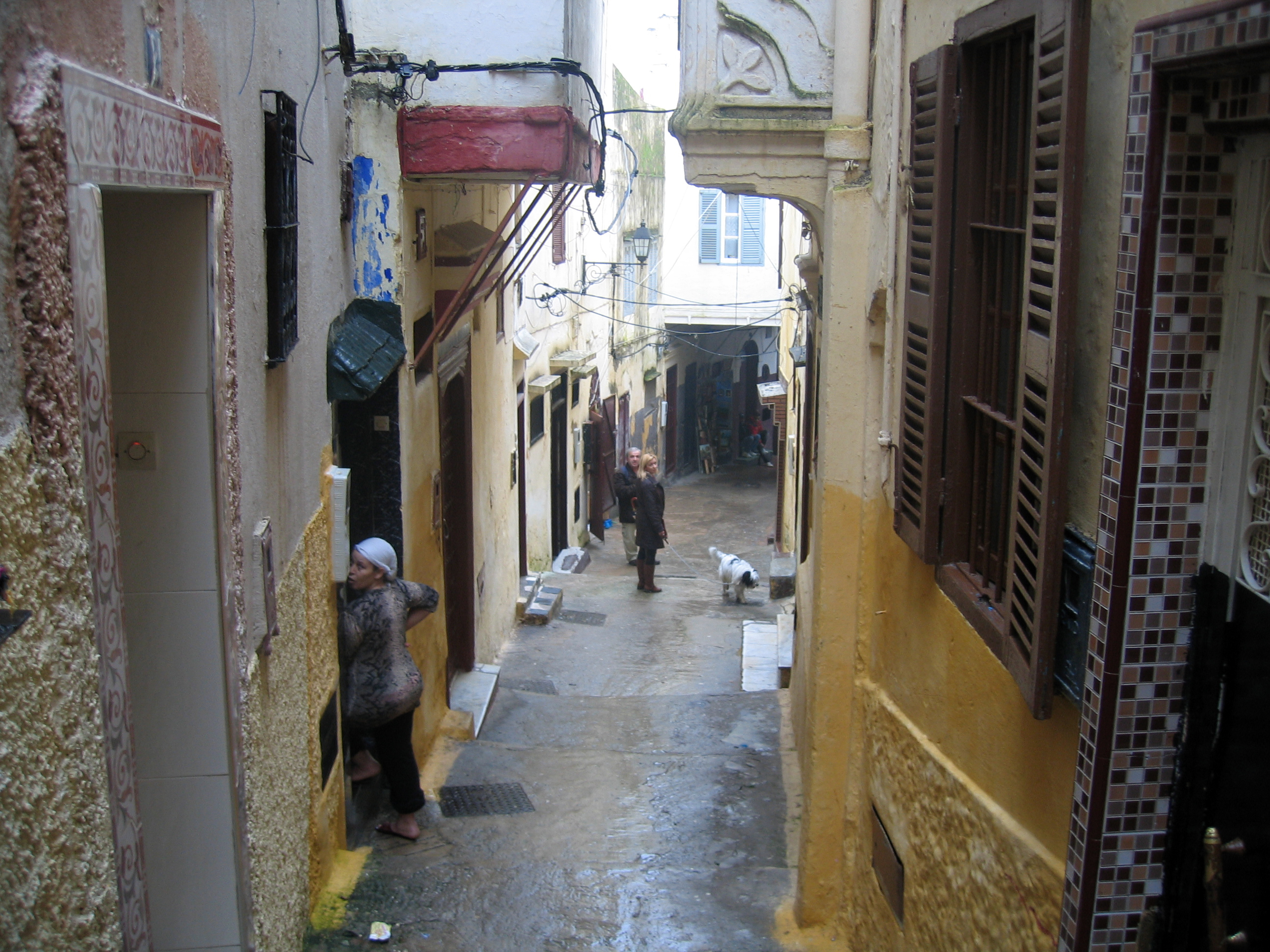
Street in Medina (Old City)

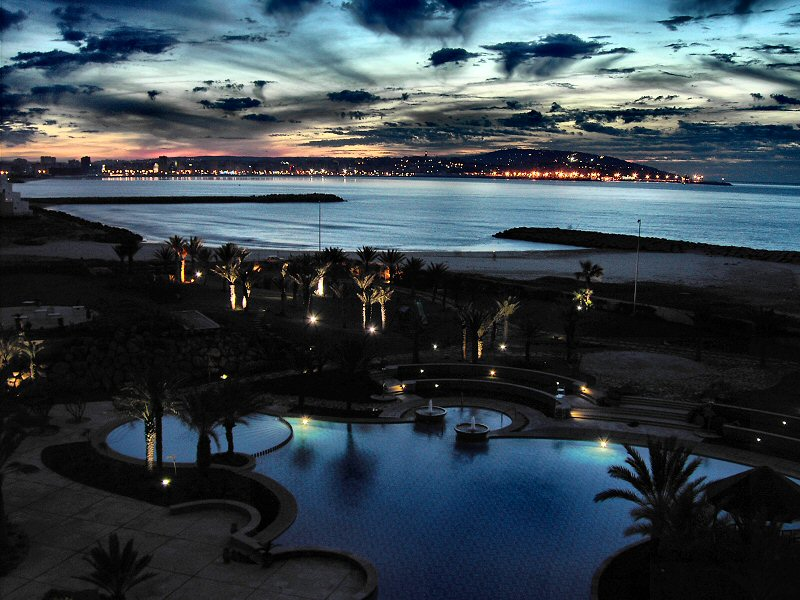
A view of Tangier Bay at sunset as seen from the Malabata suburb.

Tangier's economy relies heavily on tourism. Seaside resorts have been increasing with projects funded by foreign investments. Real estate and construction companies have been investing heavily in tourist infrastructures. A bay delimiting the city center extends for more than seven kilometers.

Hamptons International and Emaar have identified Tangier as a major growth area and recently unveiled Tinja, a resort on the Atlantic, twenty minutes drive from Tangier and an hour from Spain. Tangier will be made up of six distinctive communities with a hill-top community as the centre-piece.

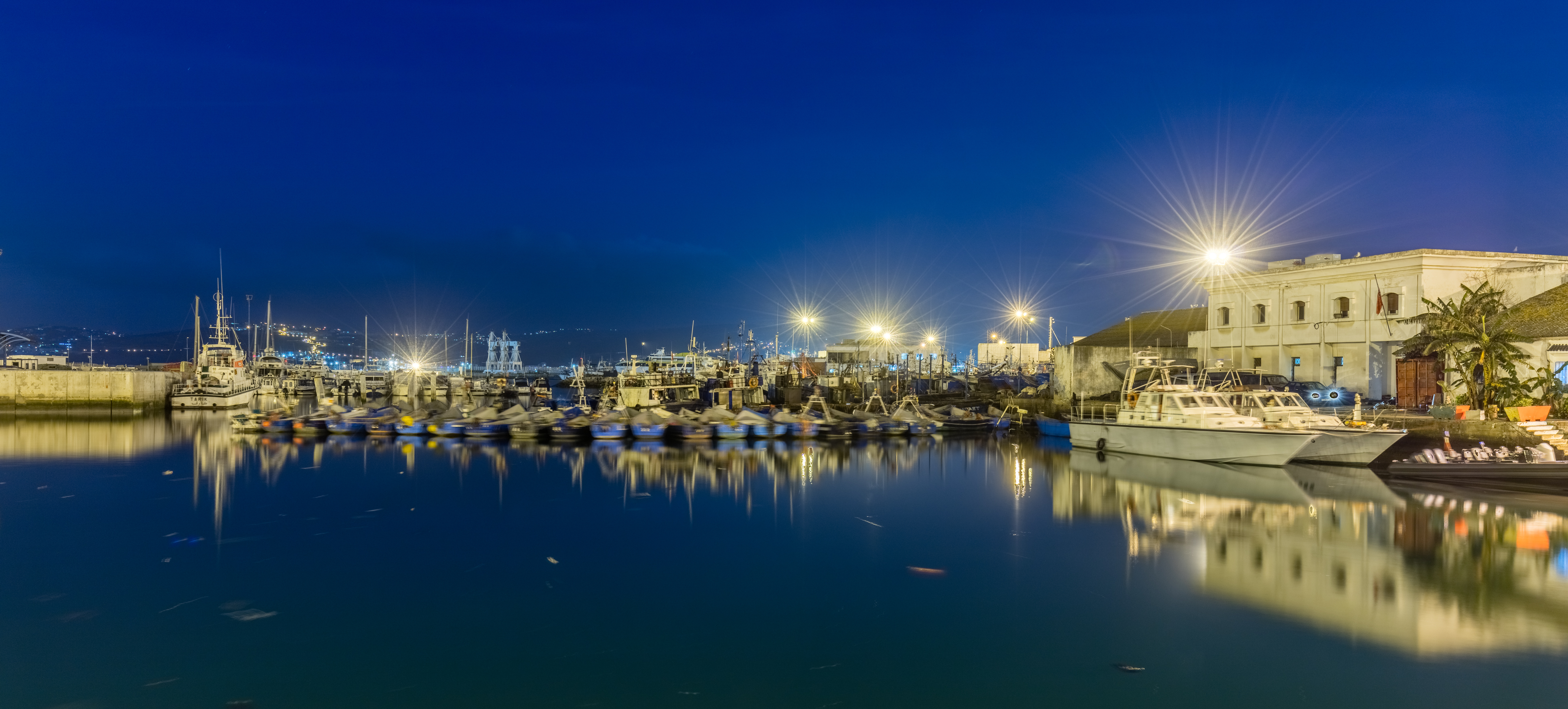
Port of Tangier.

Typically, the resort features a wealth of recreational and leisure facilities as well as a beach and spa hotel. With this development, Emaar aims to capitalize on the rental market; a sound strategy with a current lack of quality housing available and also no tax on rental income for purchasers for five years.

In terms of pricing, on the higher-end of the market, pricing is anywhere between US$1,575 and US$4,726 per sq m built, depending on the specifications and services which remains competitive with Europe and other Middle Eastern destinations".

== Development ==
Before 1956, Tangier was a city with international status. It had a great image and attracted many artists. After Morocco regained control over Tangier, this attention slacked off. Investment was low and the city lost its economic importance. But when Mohammed VI of Morocco became king in 1999, he developed a plan for the economic revival of Tangier.

The economic boom in the city caused a population boom as well. Upgrading social services and infrastructure has become a necessity. A large-scale development program was created, requiring MAD 2.46bln (about $320mln) to upgrade the city. It was approved in August 2008 under the chairmanship of King Mohammed VI.

The upgrading program will benefit mainly the popular and suburban neighborhoods of the city in order to guarantee harmony in the urban setting by reinforcing basic infrastructures and providing social equipment to the environment-related projects. This colossal investment is meant to enable Tangier to hook up again with its prestigious image, and cope with the economic development triggered in the northern region, as huge, structuring projects are launched here and there on the Mediterranean coasts of the kingdom. Tangier Medina will benefit from $11.5mln to revamp the road grid, better public transportation, improve traffic and reinforce social equipment.

=== Infrastructure ===
The city is linked to Kenitra, Rabat and Casablanca via high speed rail "TGV", and soon will be linked to Marrakech with the expansion of Morocco's high speed rail network, which will reduce travel times from 8 hours to only 2 hours. Tangier is also linked to every major Moroccan city with the Autoroute.

Tangier is home to the biggest stadium in Morocco as of 2026. The Ibn Battouta stadium is a 75,000 seater stadium which was recently expanded from 45,000 seats.

Tangier is also home to a highly productive automobile plant run by Renault. The factory produced 100,000 vehicles in 2013, and will eventually produce 400,000 annually. Cars produced at the plant are exported to destinations around the world, including France, Germany, and Turkey.

== Tangier Exportation Free Zone ==
The creation of the TEFZ increased the economic output of the city significantly. The TEFZ is a protected free trade environment where companies from around the world can operate tax-free. It covers an area of 345 hectares. It incorporates a vast container port at the junction of the biggest maritime routes in the world with the capacity to handle both cargo and passenger ships. The free zone allowed Tangier to develop into an industrial pillar of the country.

== Tangier-Med ==
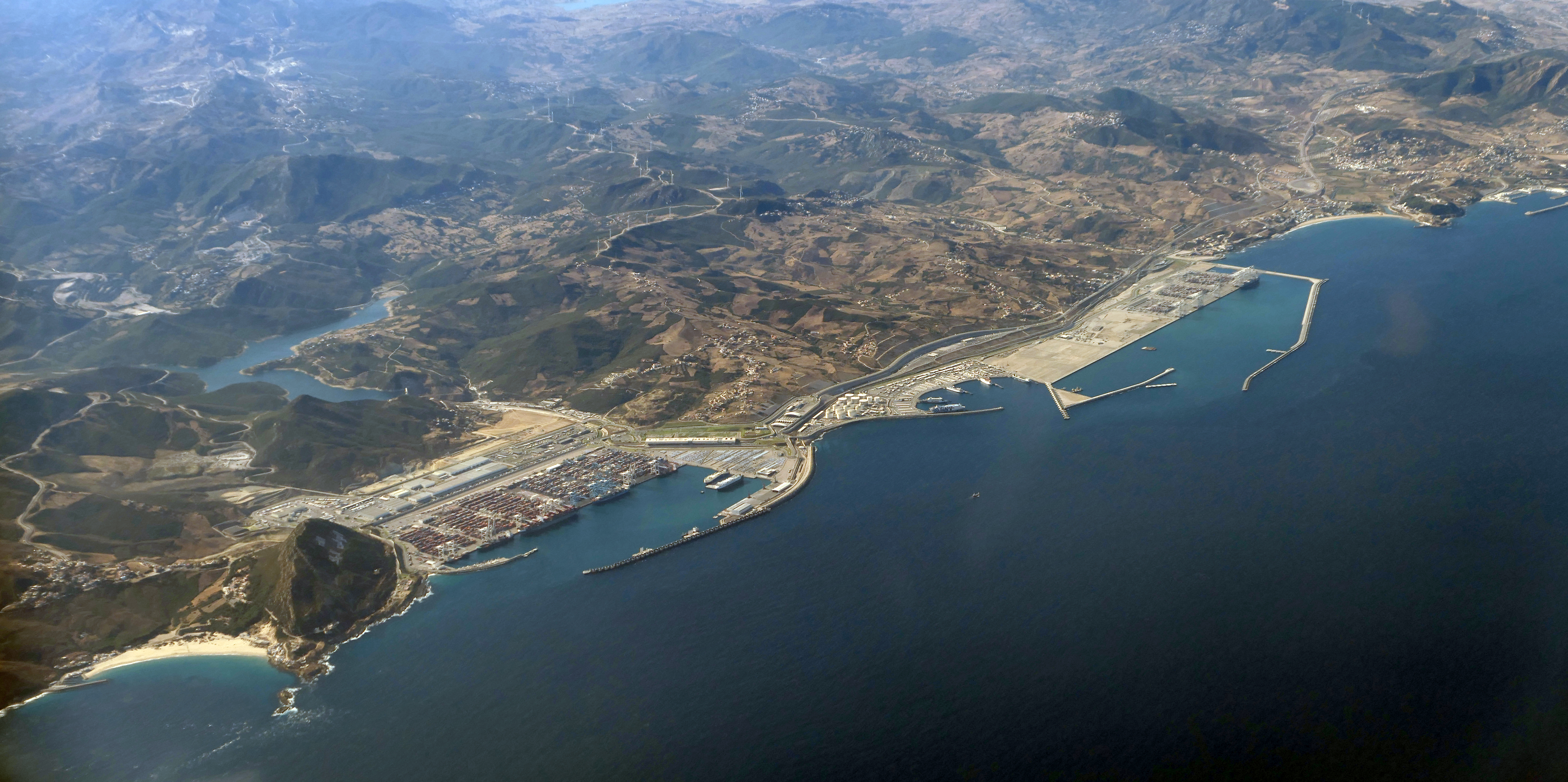
Port of Tangier-med

The Tangier-Med is the largest port in Africa and one of largest in the Mediterranean sea.

The complex has important economic effects in terms of jobs, creation of added value and foreign investment. Its particular position on the Straits of Gibraltar, at the crossing of two major maritime routes, and 15 km from the European Union enables it to serve a market of hundreds of millions of consumers through the industrial and commercial free zones which will be run by well-known private operators. It also wins part of the strong growth market of container transshipment and has become the leading hub for cereal transshipment, a facility which is non-existent in the north-west African region at present.

The complex is implemented, coordinated and managed by TMSA, a private company with public prerogatives, operating under an agreement with the State and interacting with the different ministries involved.

== See also ==
- Economy of Morocco
- Economy of Africa
- Plan Azur
