= Tanger Med =

Industrial port complex in Morocco

Port of Tanger Med

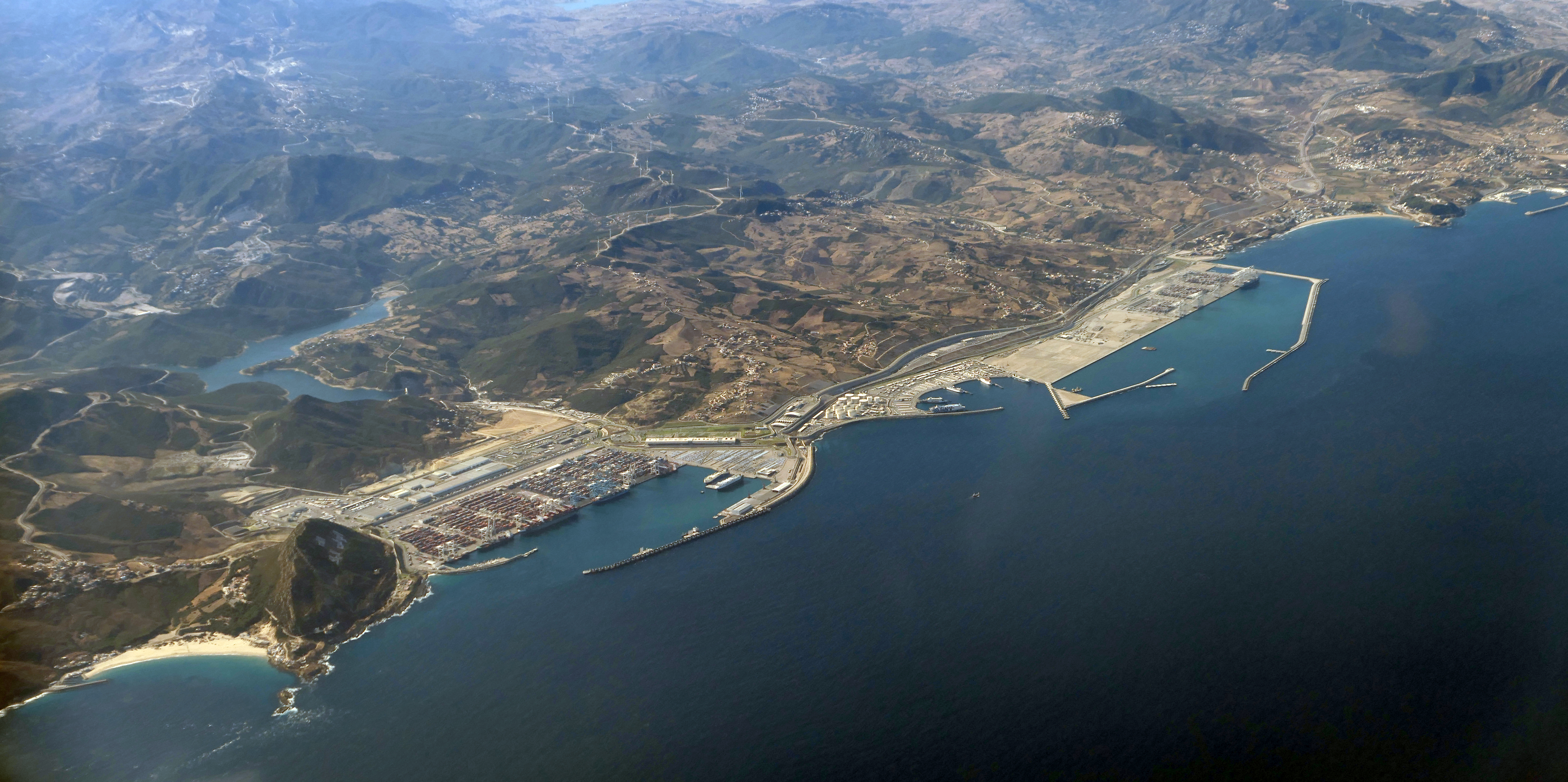
- Aerial view of the port in 2019 Satellite imagery of the Port in 2026
- Interactive map of Port of Tanger Med

Location
- Country: Morocco
- Location: Ksar El Majaz, Fahs-Anjra Province
- Coordinates: 35.874980°N 5.520710°W
- UN/LOCODE: MAPTM

Details
- Operated by: Tanger Med Port Authority S.A.
- General Manager: Mehdi Tazi Riffi

Statistics
- Website www.tangermedport.com/en/

Tanger Med (in Arabic: طنجة المتوسط) is a Moroccan industrial port complex, located 45 km northeast of Tangier and opposite Tarifa, Spain (15 km north) on the Strait of Gibraltar, with handling capacities of 11 million containers, one of the largest industrial ports in the world, and the largest port in Africa and the Mediterranean Sea. It has reached 7 million passengers, 700,000 trucks and the export of 1 million vehicles.

Tanger Med also consists of an industrial platform for 1100 companies, representing an annual export business of €8Bn in 2020. operating in various sectors such as automotive, aeronautics, food processing, logistics and textiles.

== Overview ==
The Tanger Med Project is the largest port in Africa and the Mediterranean Sea. The project is a strategic priority of the Moroccan government for the economic and social development of the North Morocco region. It is part of the economic policy orienting Morocco towards exports, based on eight clearly identified export sectors, with particular emphasis on the free trade agreement with the European Union to be implemented by 2012.

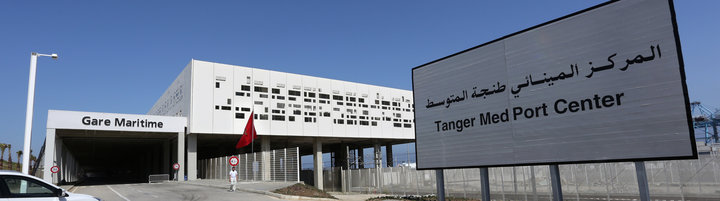
The maritime station of the Tanger Med Port

Completion of the «Tangier-Mediterranean» project will have important economic effects in terms of jobs, creation of added value and foreign investment. Its particular position on the Straits of Gibraltar, at the crossing of two major maritime routes, and 15 km from the European Union will enable it to serve a market of hundreds of millions of consumers through the industrial and commercial free zones which will be run by well-known private operators. It will also win part of the strong growth market of container transshipment and become the leading hub for cereal transshipment, a facility which is non-existent in the north-west African region at present.

The project will be implemented, coordinated and managed by TMSA, a private company with public prerogatives, operating under an agreement with the State and interacting with the different ministries involved.

The port complex will have important economic effects in terms of jobs, creation of added value and foreign investment. In addition to the economic effects of the operation of the port, there will be significant effects resulting from its construction, particularly through foreign investments, and others from the operation of the free zones (direct and indirect added value, direct gains, jobs and foreign investment).

A draft loan contract of $180 mln to fund the expansion works of Tanger Med port was signed in October 2008 for building a second deepwater port, dubbed "Tangier Med II", to meet the growing demand for container handling at international level in sea transport. The new port facilities, scheduled to be operational by the second half of 2012, will include two new container terminals with a total length of 2,800 m and an additional nominal capacity of 5 million containers. Final official approval for "Tangier Med II" was received on 7 January 2009, with actual construction started on 17 June 2009. In November 2010 the European Investment Bank (EIB) signed a loan of €200 million for the extension of the port.

The port is expected to reach full capacity by 2015, and to operate 8 million containers, 7 million passengers, 700,000 trucks, 2 million vehicles, and 10 million MT of oil products. When completed in 2018, it is expected to be the busiest port on the Mediterranean. The port's turnover keeps increasing: it handled 65 million tons of goods in 2019, jumped to 75 million tons in 2020 and 101 million tons in 2021.

== Governance ==
Tanger Med is managed by Tanger Mediterranean Special Agency (TMSA), a public limited company with a board of directors and supervisory board. It agency was created in 2003 to fulfill the government's engagement through an innovative mode of governance based on the control of costs and impacts of a large-scale project on the national territory.

The Supervisory Board is composed of:

- Fouad Brini, Chairman of the Supervisory Board.
- Moulay Hafid Elalamy, Minister of Industry, Trade, Investment and Digital Economy.
- Abdelouafi Laftit, Minister of the Interior.
- Dounia Ben Abbas Taârji, President of the Board of Directors of Hassan II Fund for Economic and Social Development.
- Nadia Fettah El Alaoui, Minister of Economy and Finance.
- Abdellatif Zaghnoun, General Director of « Caisse de Dépôt et de Gestion » (CDG).
- Nizar Baraka, Minister of Equipment, Transport and Logistics.
- Mounir El Bouyoussfi, Director General of the Agency for the Promotion and Development of the North (APDN).

The Board of Directors is composed of the President Mr. Mehdi Tazi Riffi and Mr. Jaafar Mrhardy, respectively President and Member of the Board.

The current executive board consists of the following members:

- Mr. Mehdi TAZI RIFFI, President of the Board
- M. Jaafar MRHARDY, Member of the Executive Board in charge of the industrial pole and Managing Director of Tanger Med Zones
- Ms. Loubna GHALEB, Member of the Executive Board in charge of the group’s strategy and Group’s Strategy Director
- Mr.Tarik EL AROUSSI, Member of the Executive Board in charge of the service pole, CSR and International Development Director
- Mr. Hassan ABKARI, Member of the Executive Board in charge of port operations and logistics and Deputy Managing Director of Tanger Med Port Authority, in charge of operational activities

== Location ==
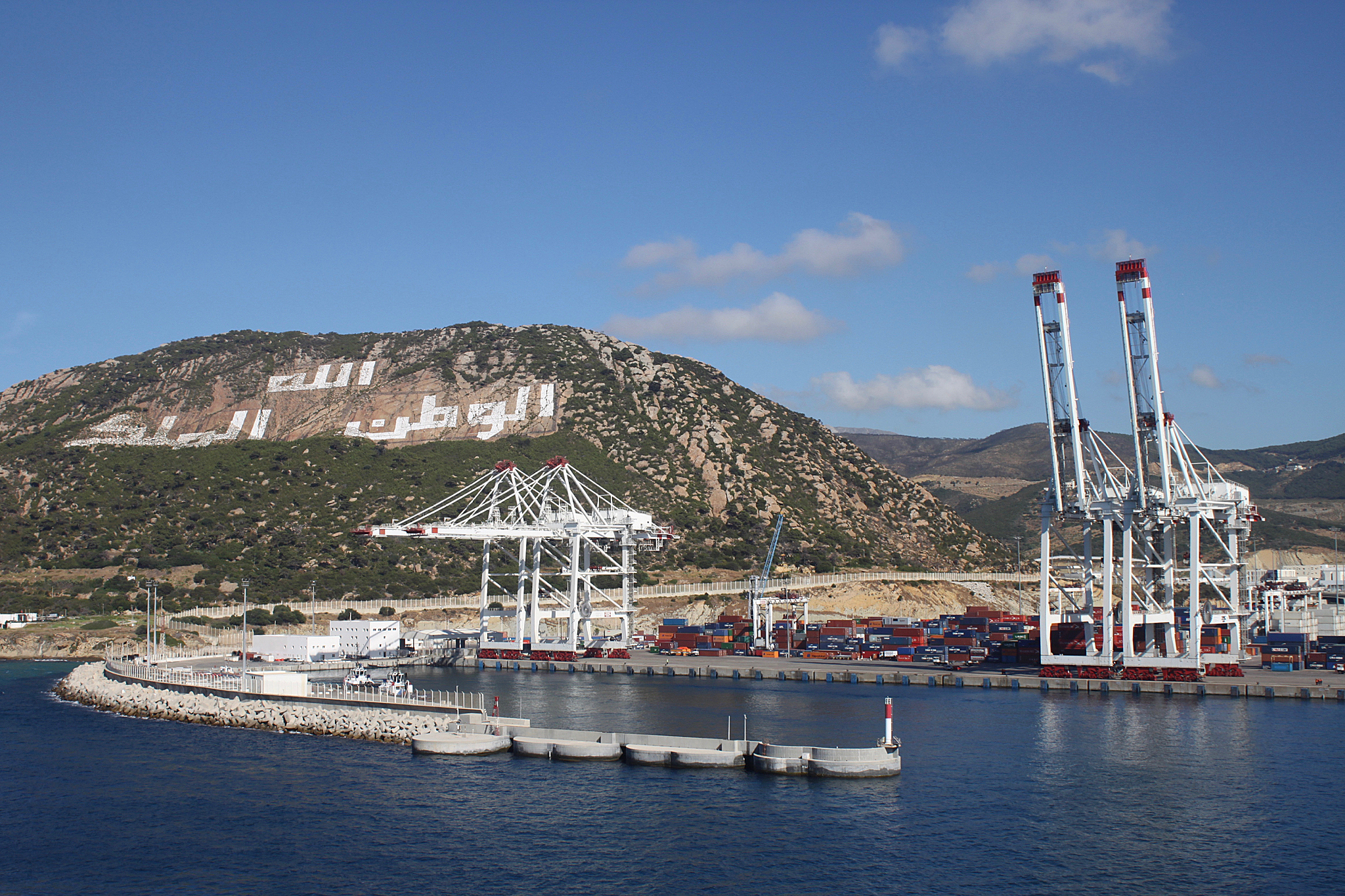
Port of Tanger Med

Tanger Med is located in northern Morocco, 40 km east of Tangier on the Strait of Gibraltar in the Mediterranean. It is 14 km away from the Spanish coast, and lies on the East-West global maritime trade route between Asia, Europe and North America, with connectivity to more than 180 ports in 70 countries.

On the northeastern end of the port, on the flank of the adjacent Montaña Kasbah, a giant illuminated arabic inscription greets sailors eastbound through the Strait of Gibraltar. It reads "Allāh, Al-Waṭan, Al-Malīk" ("Allah, the Homeland, the King") which is the national motto of Morocco. The inscription is visible on Google Earth (35°53′58″N 5°28′57″W) and can be seen from a distance of 15 km from Tarifa, Spain.

== Infrastructure ==
- Four container terminals with a total capacity of 9 million TEU containers
- A passenger and ro-ro port with 8 berths
- A hydrocarbon terminal with a storage capacity of 500,000 tons
- Two car terminals with 20 hectares of storage
- A bulk terminal with 450 meters of quay
- Rail connections for goods and passengers

== Port capacity ==
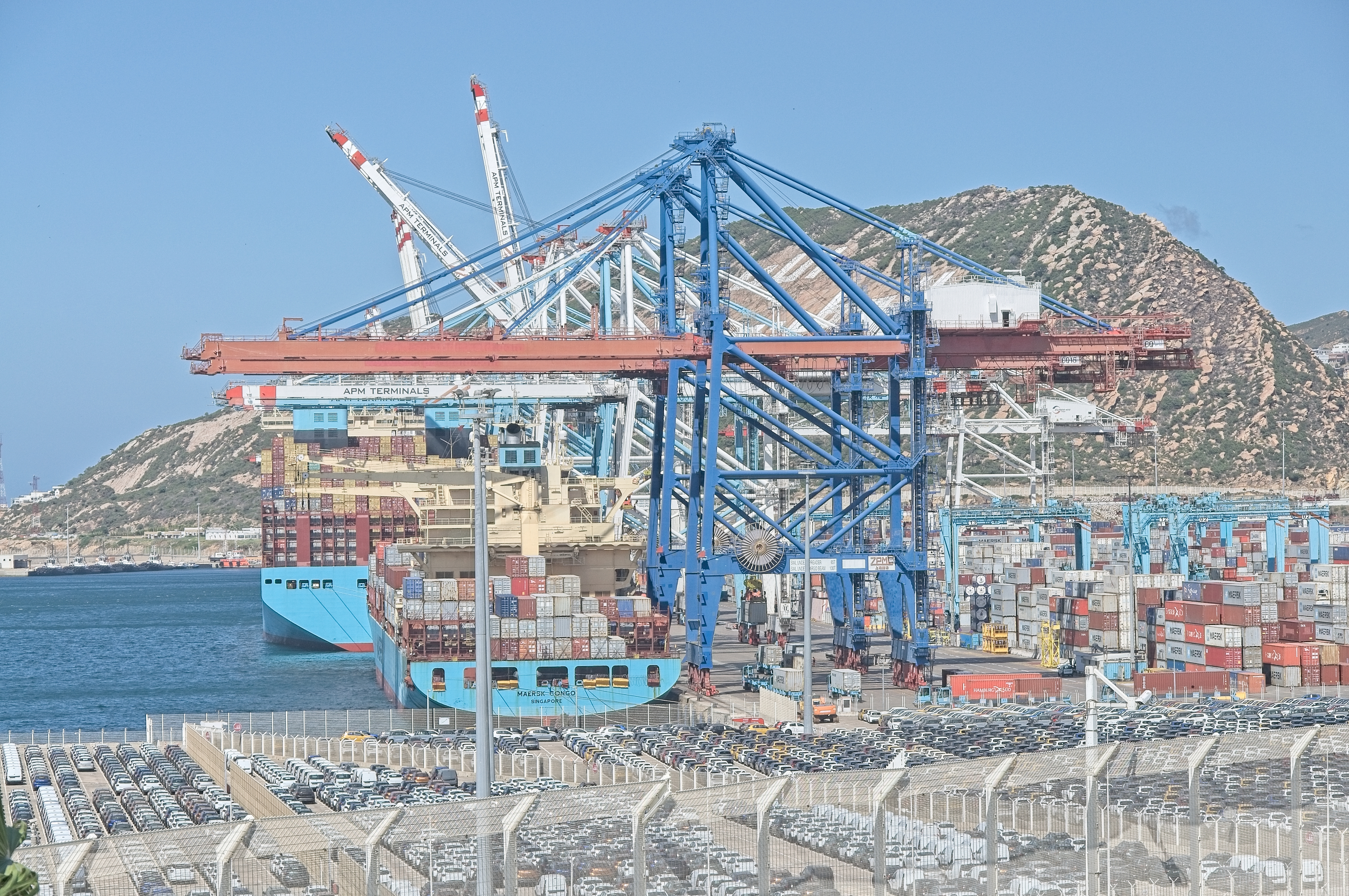
Point of view on Tanger Med port, August 5, 2023

Tanger Med Port

- total of 11 million containers of capacity

Tanger Med I Port

- 3.5 million containers of capacity
- 1.6 km of container docks at -16 and -18 meters
- 2.6 km of dikes
- 140 hectares of land, of which 80 hectares for container traffic, served by rail
- 2 petrol stations
- 0.6 km from quai vraquier

Tanger Med Port Passengers

- 2.5 km from dikes
- 8 berths with draft of 9 and 12 meters
- 35 hectares of land reserved for passenger and TIR activities
- Several supporting spaces representing a total of 30 hectares of median

Tanger Med II Port

- 5.5 million containers of capacity
- 2.8 km of container docks at - 16 and - 18 meters
- 4.8 km from dikes
- 160 hectares of land totally won over the sea
- 2 optional oil stations

== Industrial platform ==
More than 750 companies operate from Tanger Med port. These include:

- Bosch
- Daher
- Huawei
- 3M
- Decathlon
- Emirates Logistics Group (in partnership with Adidas AG)
- Furukawa Electric
- Siemens

These companies represent a yearly export turnover in excess of €5.5Bn in various sectors such as automotive, aeronautics, logistics, textile and trade. In 2017, Tanger Med hosted 54 new industrial projects.

== Automotive ecosystem at Tanger Med ==
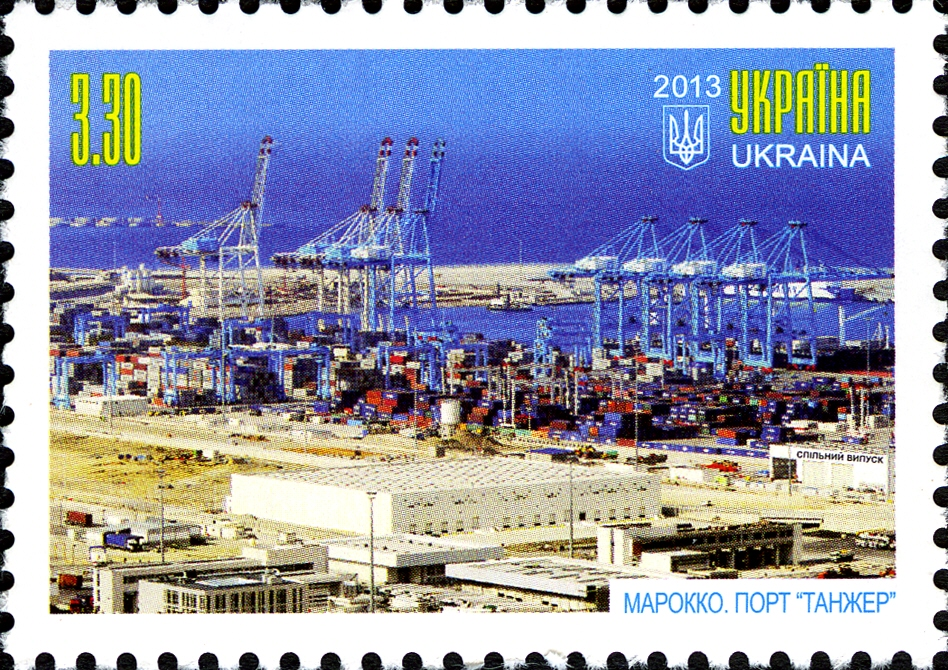
Tanger Med port depicted in a Ukrainian stamp

Renault TangerMed hosts the largest car plant in Africa.

Tanger is home to the following automotive companies:

- Renault Nissan
- Fiat
- Delphi Auto
- Hands Corporation
- Sogefi
- Denso
- Magnetti
- Yazaki
- Valeo

== Sponsorship ==
- (Morocco) Ittihad Tanger
- (Morocco) Moghreb Tétouan

== See also ==
- Economy of Tangier
- Port of Algeciras
