= Anjra =

Anjra Arabic: أنجرة Standard Moroccan Tamazight: ⴰⵏⵊⵔⴰ
- Rural commune and town
- Interactive map of Anjra
- Coordinates: 35.6642°N 5.5111°W
- Country: Morocco
- Region: Tanger-Tetouan-Al Hoceima
- Province: Fahs-Anjra

Population (2004)
  - Total: 15,035
- Time zone: UTC+0 (GMT)

Anjra (Arabic: أنجرة; Standard Moroccan Tamazight: ⴰⵏⵊⵔⴰ) is a small town and rural commune in Fahs-Anjra Province of the Tanger-Tetouan-Al Hoceima region of Morocco. It is the prefecture's capital created by Royal decree in 2003. At the time of the 2004 census, the commune had a total population of 15,035 people living in 2,681 households.
