= Al Bahraoyine =

- Rural commune and town
- Location within Morocco Location within Africa
- Coordinates: 35.7919°N 5.7204°W
- Country: Morocco
- Region: Tanger-Tetouan-Al Hoceima
- Province: Fahs-Anjra

Population (2004)
  - Total: 10,051
- Time zone: UTC+0 (GMT)

Al Bahraoyine is a small coastal town bordering the Strait of Gibraltar and it is a rural commune in Fahs-Anjra Province of the Tanger-Tetouan-Al Hoceima region of Morocco. At the time of the 2004 census, the commune had a total population of 10051 people living in 2093 households.
