= Taghramt =

Town in Tanger-Tetouan-Al Hoceima, Morocco

- Rural commune and town
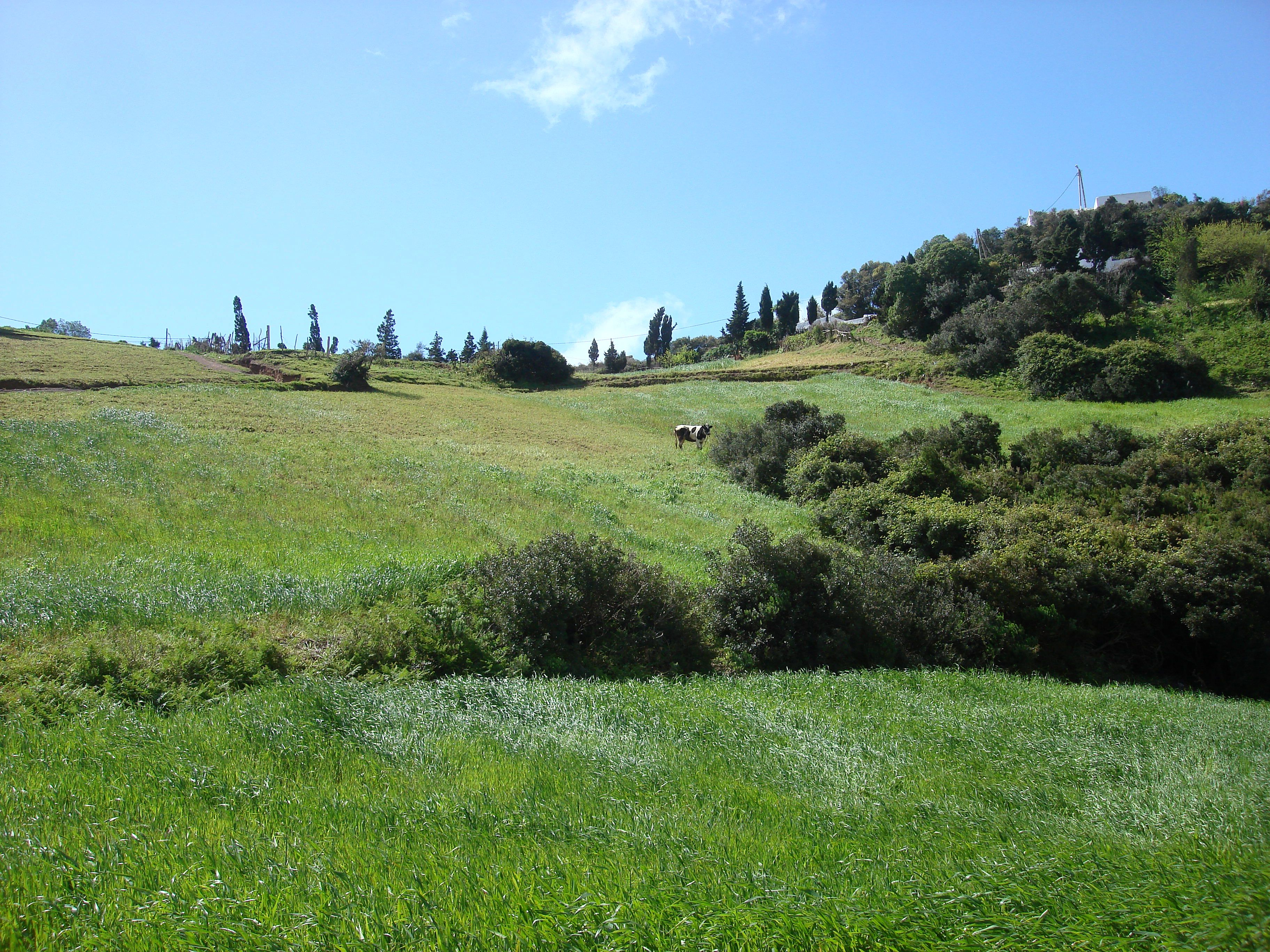
- A green field near Taghramt

- Location within Morocco Location within Africa
- Coordinates: 35.7877°N 5.4677°W
- Country: Morocco
- Region: Tanger-Tetouan-Al Hoceima
- Province: Fahs-Anjra

Population (2004)
  - Total: 13,362
- Time zone: UTC+0 (GMT)

Taghramt is a small town and rural commune in Fahs-Anjra Province of the Tanger-Tetouan-Al Hoceima region of Morocco. At the time of the 2004 census, the commune had a total population of 13,362 people living in 2717 households.
