= Malloussa =

Coordinates: 35°44′N 5°38′W

- Rural commune and town
- Interactive map of Malloussa
- Country: Morocco
- Region: Tanger-Tetouan-Al Hoceima
- Province: Fahs-Anjra

Population (2004)
  - Total: 10,739
- Time zone: UTC+0 (GMT)

Malloussa is a small town and rural commune in Fahs-Anjra Province of the Tanger-Tetouan-Al Hoceima region of Morocco. At the time of the 2004 census, the commune had a total population of 10,739 people living in 2134 households.
