= Ksar El Majaz =

- rural commune
- Interactive map of Ksar El Majaz
- Coordinates: 35°50′34″N 5°33′31″W
- Country: Morocco
- Region: Tanger-Tetouan-Al Hoceima
- Province: Fahs-Anjra

Population
  - Total: 8,949
- Time zone: UTC+0 (GMT)

Ksar El Majaz is a small town and rural commune near the Mediterranean coast in the Jebala region of northwest Morocco, between Tangier and Ceuta. Administratively, it belongs to Fahs-Anjra Province and the region of Tanger-Tetouan-Al Hoceima. By the census of 2004, it had a population of 8949 people who are nearly all Moroccan inhabitants in 1735 households.

It is notable for hosting Tanger Med, largest container port in Africa and the Mediterranean.
