= Massalia (ship) =

1992 ferry

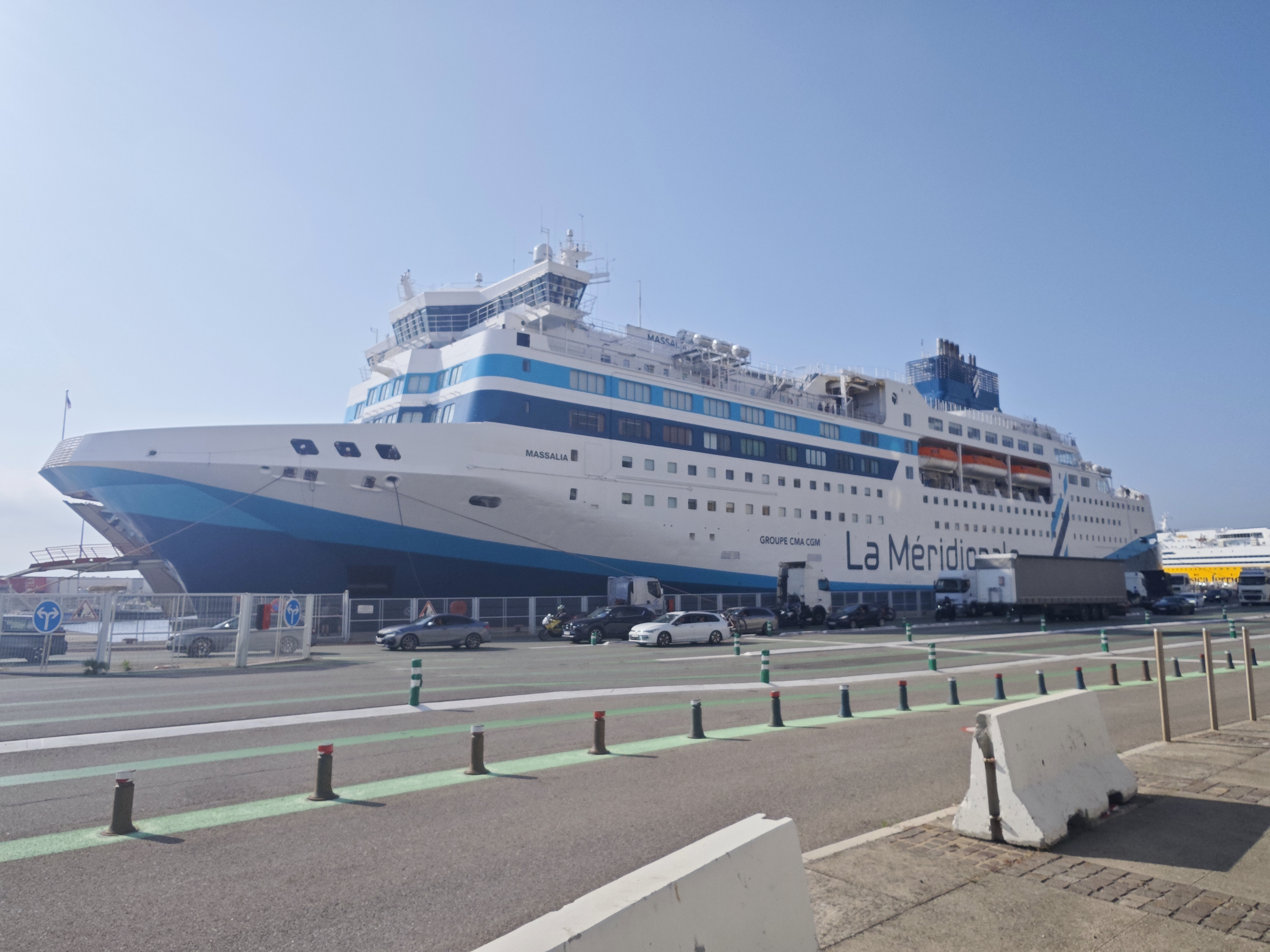
- Massalia moored at Bastia in June 2025

History
- Name: 1992-2025: Normandie; 2025-present: Massalia
- Owner: 1990-2020: Senecal; 2020-2025: Brittany Ferries; 2025-present: La Méridionale
- Operator: 1992-2025: Brittany Ferries; 2025-present: La Méridionale
- Port of registry: Marseille, France
- Route: Marseille⇄Tanger Med
- Ordered: May 1990
- Builder: Kværner Masa-Yards Turku New Shipyard, Finland
- Launched: 3 October 1991
- Christened: 15 May 1992
- Maiden voyage: 18 May 1992
- Identification: IMO number: 9006253
- Status: in service

General characteristics
- Tonnage: 27,542 GT
- Length: 161 m (528 ft 3 in)
- Beam: 26 m (85 ft 4 in)
- Installed power: 4 × Wärtsilä Vasa 12V32E; 6,033 bhp (4,499 kW) each
- Speed: 20.5 knots (38.0 km/h; 23.6 mph)
- Capacity: 2,123 passengers; 575 vehicles
- Crew: 137

Massalia is a ferry operated by La Méridionale between Marseille, France and Tanger Med, Morocco. Built in 1992 as the Normandie for Brittany Ferries, it operated between Portsmouth and Caen until 2025.

== History ==
Normandie was built in 1992 at Kværner Masa-Yards Turku New Shipyard in Finland for Brittany Ferries, entering service on the Portsmouth to Caen service on 18 May 1992.

On 17 April 2025, Normandie was retired by Brittany Ferries being replaced by the Guillaume de Normandie. It was sold to La Méridionale and renamed Massalia and operates between Marseille and Tanger Med.
