= Portsmouth International Port =

Coordinates: 50.8120366°N 1.0907384°W

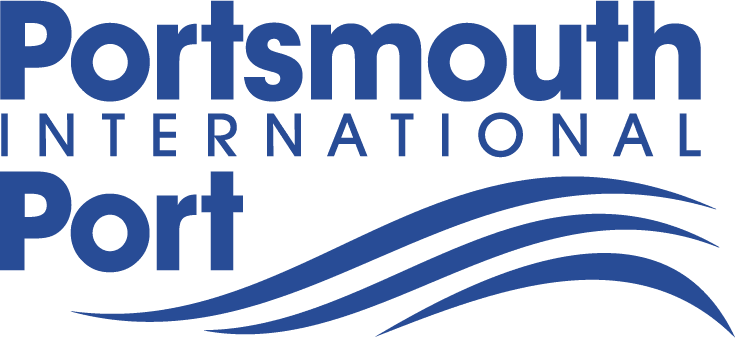

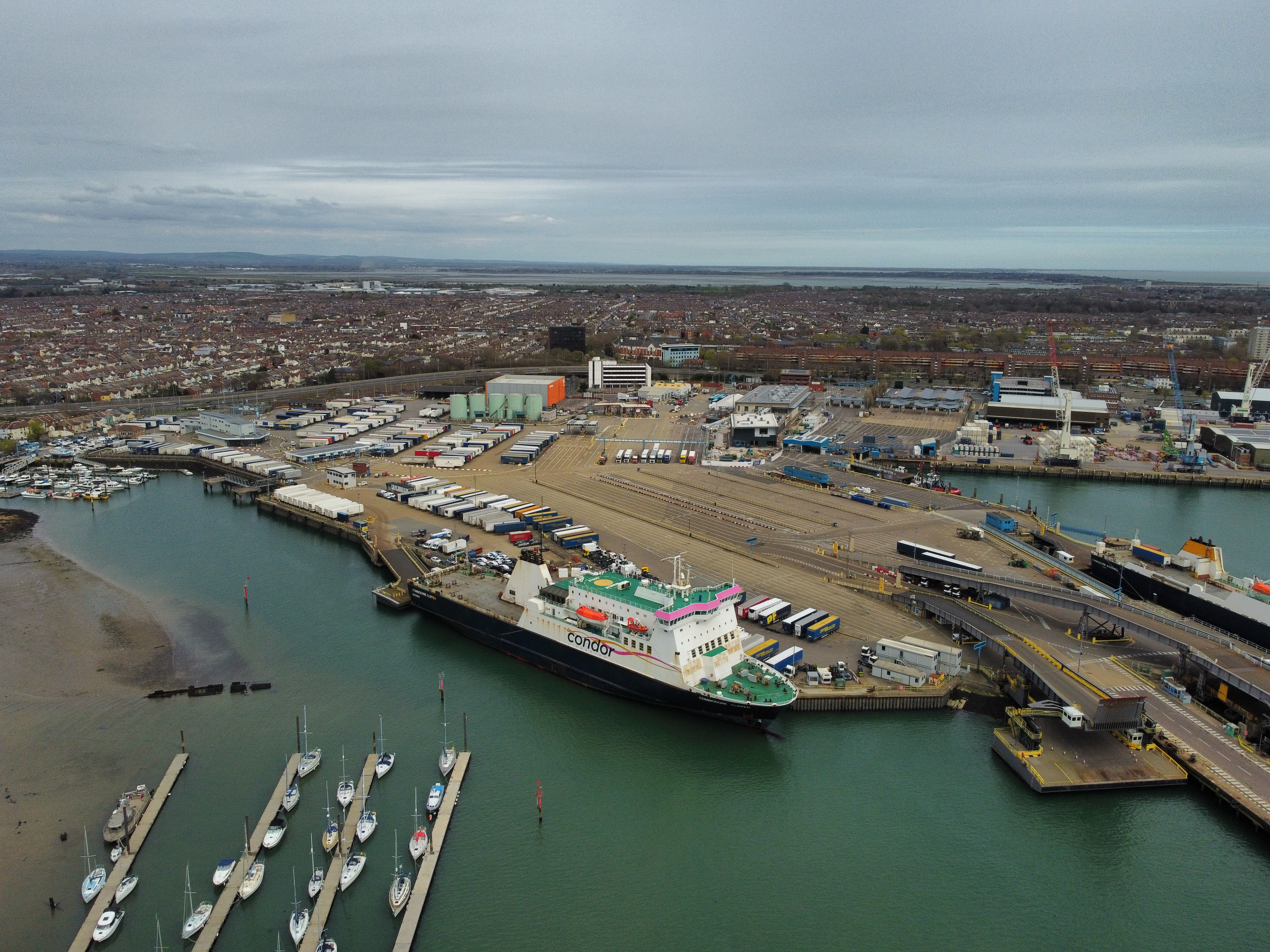
- The international ferry and cruise terminal
- Interactive map of Portsmouth International Port

Location
- Country: United Kingdom
- Location: Portsmouth, Hampshire

Details
- Opened: 1976
- Operated by: Portsmouth City Council
- Owned by: Portsmouth City Council
- Type of Harbor: Ferry, Cargo and Cruise
- No. of berths: 7
- Port director: Mike Sellers

Statistics
- Vessel arrivals: 49,285 (2022)
- Annual cargo tonnage: 933,114 (2022)
- Passenger traffic: 6,885,687 (2022)
- Website www.portsmouth-port.co.uk

Portsmouth International Port, also known as Portsmouth Continental Ferry Port, is the harbour authority for the city of Portsmouth, Hampshire, located on the south coast of Great Britain.

== History ==
Portsmouth surveyed three locations for a ferry port at the end of the 1960s, before the current location near Whale Island was chosen. The choice was based on cost and the likely benefit of cross-channel ferries. The site was at the end of the newly constructed M275. Originally built with two berths, the site opened in 1976 with the Earl William (Sealink) running to the Channel Islands, the Viking Victory (Townsend Thoresen) running to Cherbourg, and Brittany Ferries running to Saint-Malo.

Portsmouth is Britain’s most successful municipal port. It is part of Portsmouth City Council, who have funded significant investment in the port’s infrastructure since 1976. The port’s annual surplus is used to invest in the city and fund other essential council services for the benefit of the people of Portsmouth.

See the Portsmouth International Port Statistics book of 2024 for detailed statistics

== Continental Ferry Services ==
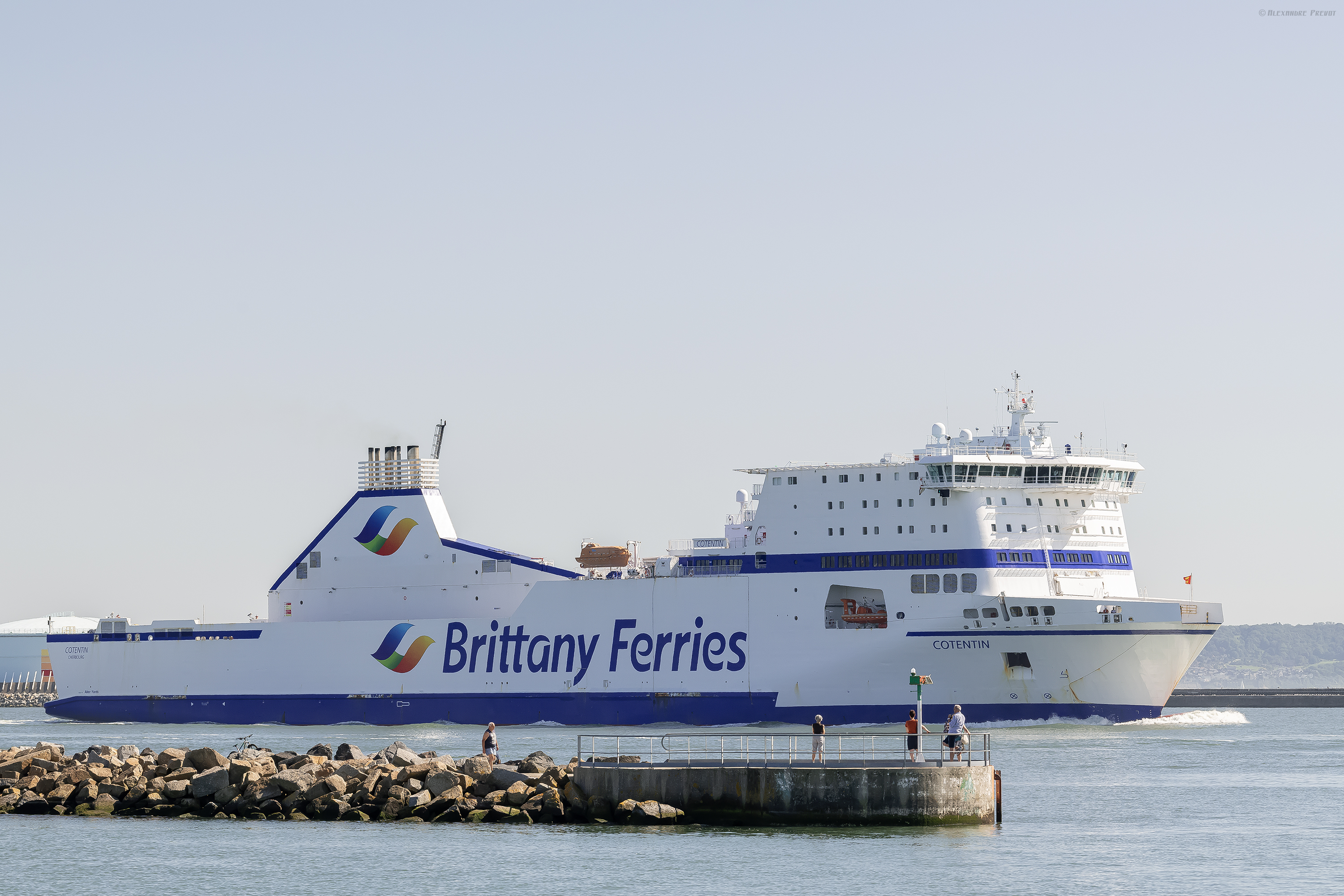
MV Cotentin, a Ro-Ro ferry formerly operated by Brittany Ferries on freight services to Le Havre, France.

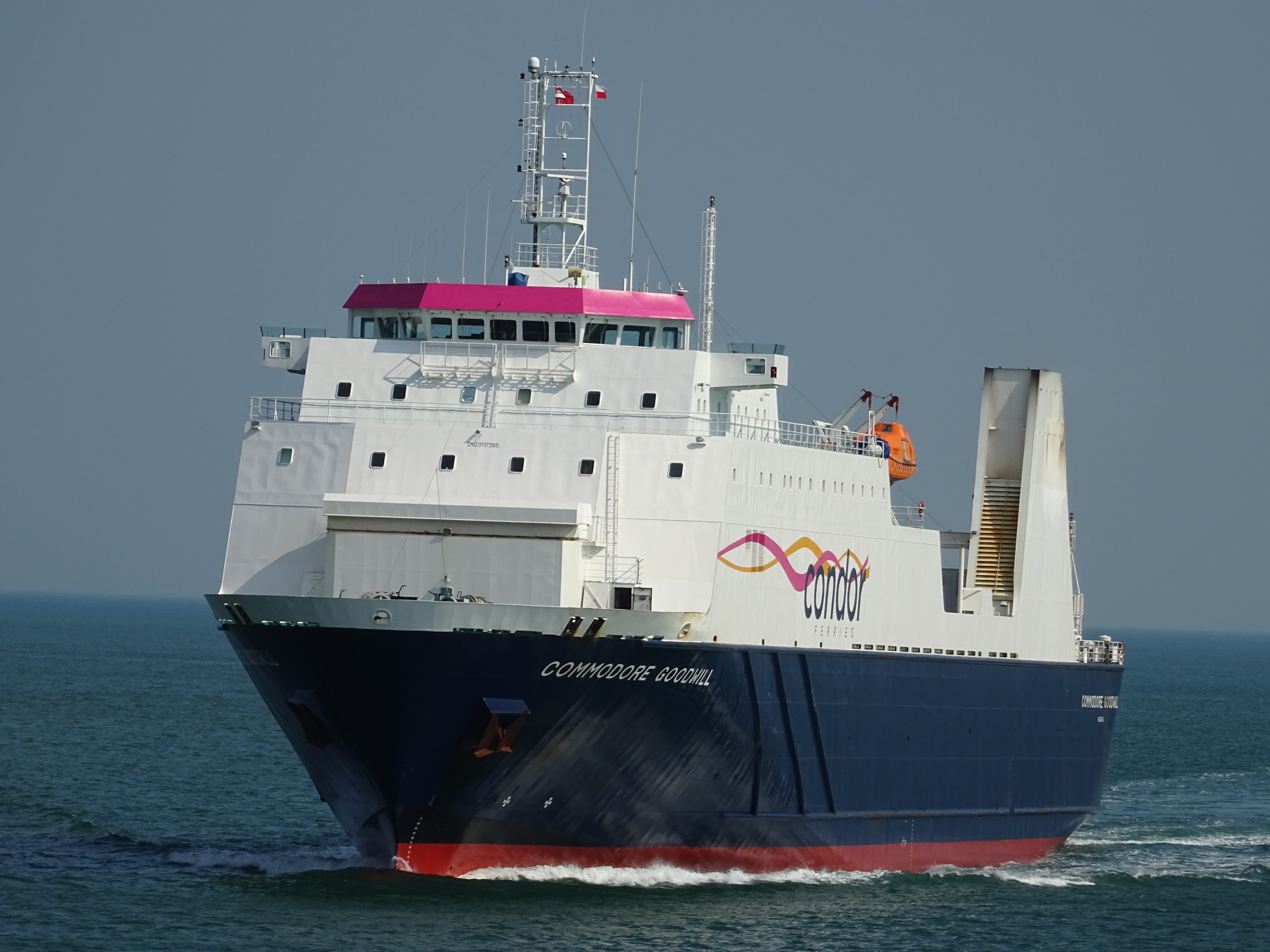
Commodore Goodwill, a Ro-Ro ferry formerly operated by Condor Ferries on freight services to the Channel Islands. She is now operated by DFDS on the route to Jersey under the name Caesarea Trader.

As of November 2026:

Ferry Operator	Destination	Frequency	Average Duration of Crossing	Vessel
Brittany Ferries	Ouistreham (Caen), France	Up to three departures a day.	7hrs	Mont St Michel; Guillaume de Normandie
Brittany Ferries	Cherbourg-Octeville, France	Direct Route: Irregular cruise ferry sailings (approximately 3 a week).	5hrs 30mins	Salamanca; Galicia; Clipper
Brittany Ferries	Cherbourg-Octeville, France	Triangular Route via Guernsey: Five departures per week	Outbound: 13hrs 30mins (via Guernsey) Return: 5hrs 45 mins (direct)	Islander
Brittany Ferries	St Peter Port, Guernsey	Triangular Route via Cherbourg: Five departures per week	Outbound: 9hrs 30mins (direct) Return: 12hrs 15mins (via Cherbourg)	Islander
Brittany Ferries	St Peter Port, Guernsey	Direct Route: Two departures per week	9hrs 30 mins	Islander
Brittany Ferries	St Malo, France	Summer: One departure per day Winter: One departure every other day.	8hrs 30mins	Saint Malo
Brittany Ferries	Zierbena (Bilbao), Spain	Two departures a week	32hrs	Galicia
Brittany Ferries	Santander, Spain	Two departures a week	34hrs	Salamanca
DFDS Seaways	St Helier, Jersey	Passenger and Freight: Six departures per week	8hrs to 12hrs (dependent on tidal rotation)	Corbière Seaways
DFDS Seaways	St Helier, Jersey	Freight Only: Six departures per week	8hrs to 12hrs (dependent on tidal rotation)	Caesarea Trader

In September 2026, Brittany Ferries ended the Portsmouth to Le Havre route earlier than planned due to technical problems with the Clipper. In November 2026, Brittany Ferries began operating a triangular route between Portsmouth, Guernsey, and Cherbourg using the Islander. This route replaces the weekly Portsmouth to St Malo route via Guernsey, as well as the Poole to Cherbourg route.

== Isle of Wight Ferry Services ==
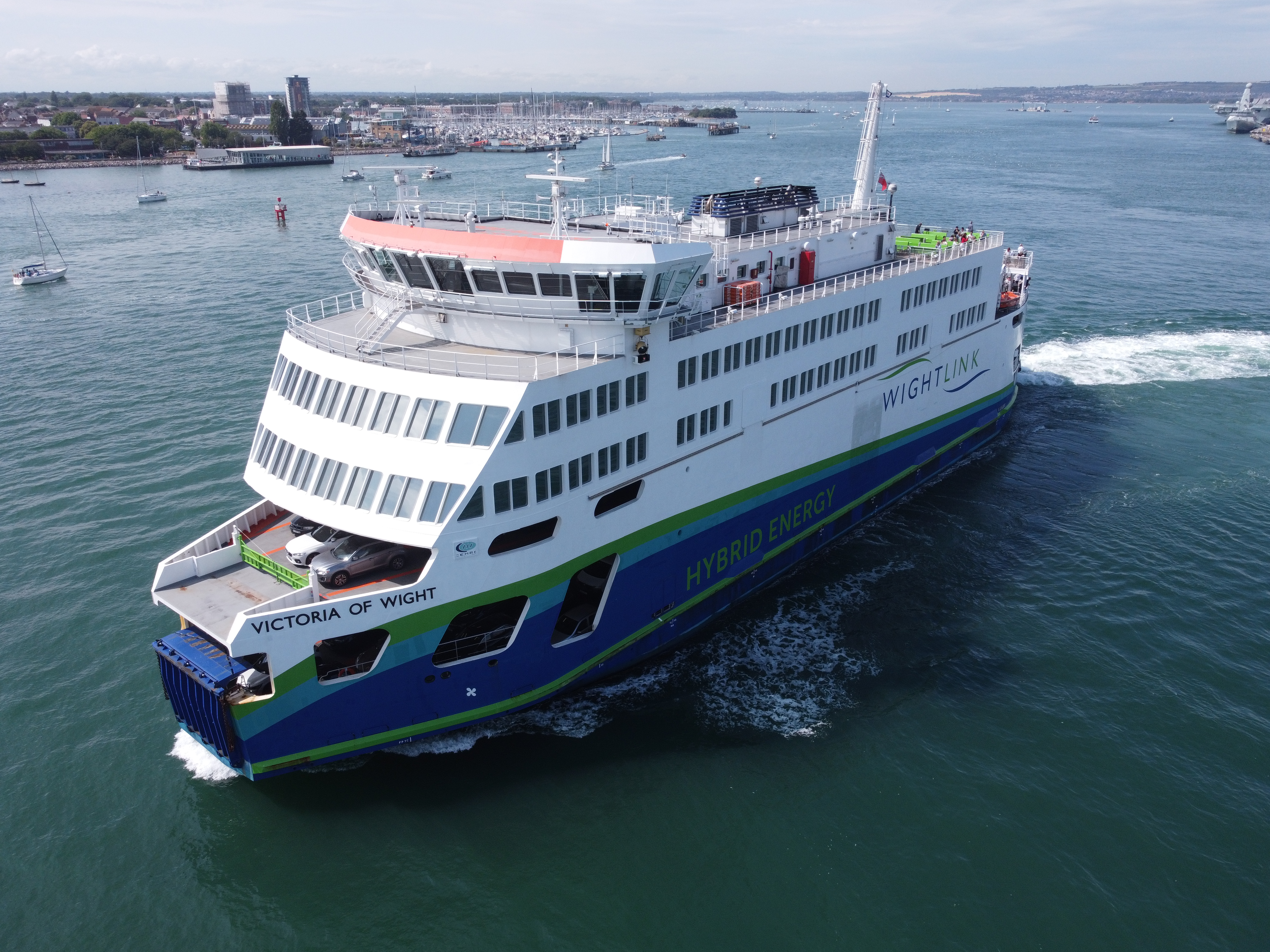
Victoria of Wight, a ferry operated by Wightlink, departing Portsmouth Harbour

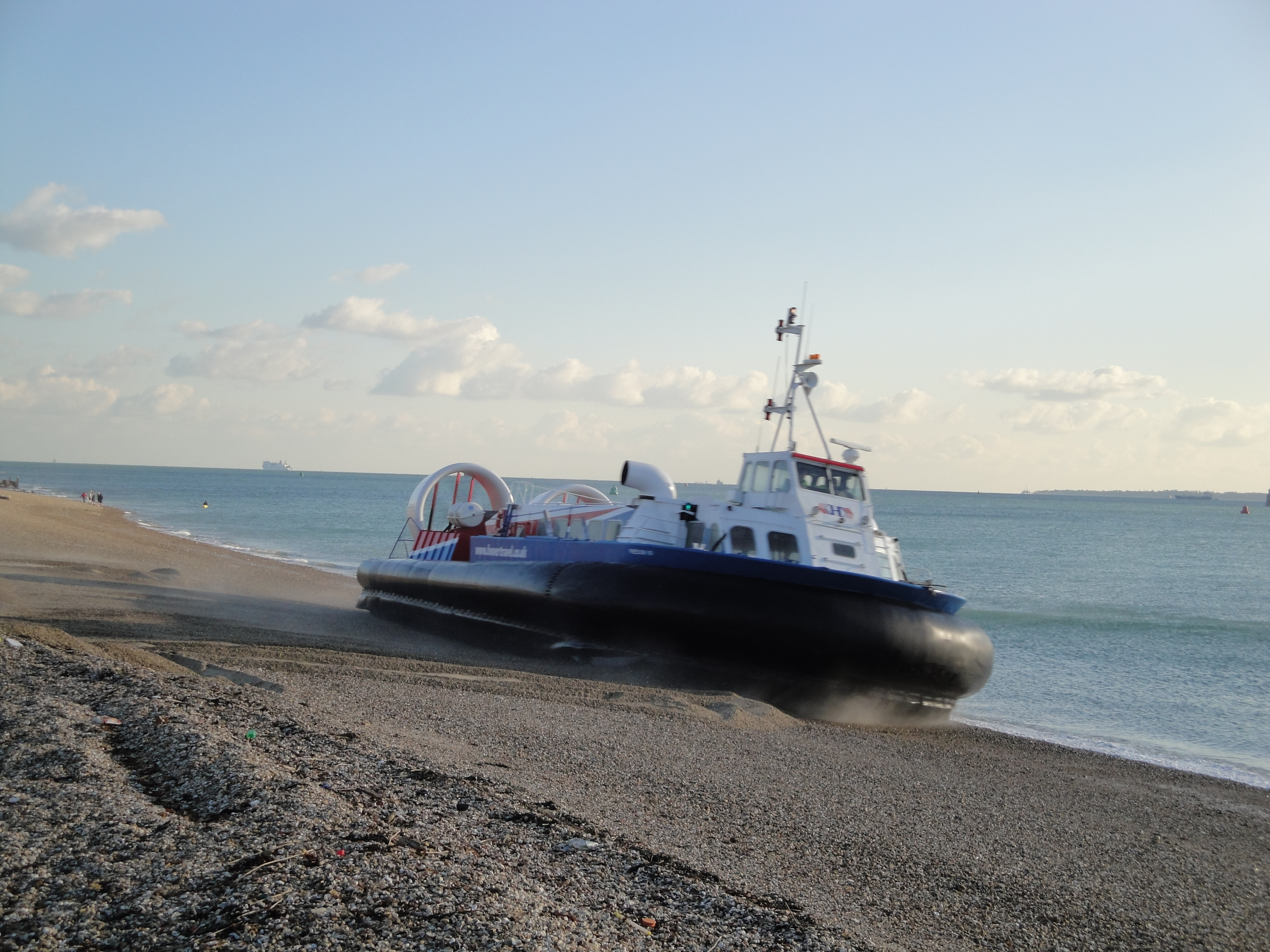
A Hovertravel service departing Southsea beach.

Ferry services to the Isle of Wight, operated by Wightlink, also depart from Portsmouth from other terminals within the city, away from Portsmouth International Port. The car ferry, which sails to Fishbourne, uses a dedicated terminal based in Old Portsmouth. In addition, a passenger catamaran service sails from Portsmouth Harbour railway station to Ryde Pier.

Hovertravel also operate passenger hovercraft services from Southsea beach to Ryde.

== Future developments ==
In early 2019, it was announced that owners Portsmouth City Council had agreed to invest £33.7m to expand the Port. £18.7m would go towards developments within Portsmouth International Port. This would include levelling and extending Berth 2 so it could accommodate ships up to 255m in length, upgrading the passenger terminal to provide dedicated facilities for cruise passengers and replacing the 35 year-old passenger boarding tower. It is predicted that the improvements will lead to an increase in the number of cruise passengers at the Port from 50,000 to 150,000 in the coming years.

The remaining £15m will be invested in improving facilities at Portico (formerly MMD Shipping Services), who operate two commercial quays within the Port.
