= Tangier Exportation Free Zone =

Coordinates: 35.7184°N 5.9145°W

Tangier Exportation Free Zone is a free economic zone located south of Tangier, Morocco. The zone has an area of 3.45 km^{2} (1.33 sq mi). It is managed by Tangier Free Zone (TFZ).
