= Fahs-Anjra Province =

Fahs-Anjra Province إقليم الفحص-أنجرة ⵜⴰⵙⴳⴰ ⵏ ⵍⴼⴰⵃⵚ-ⴰⵏⵊⵔⴰ
- Province
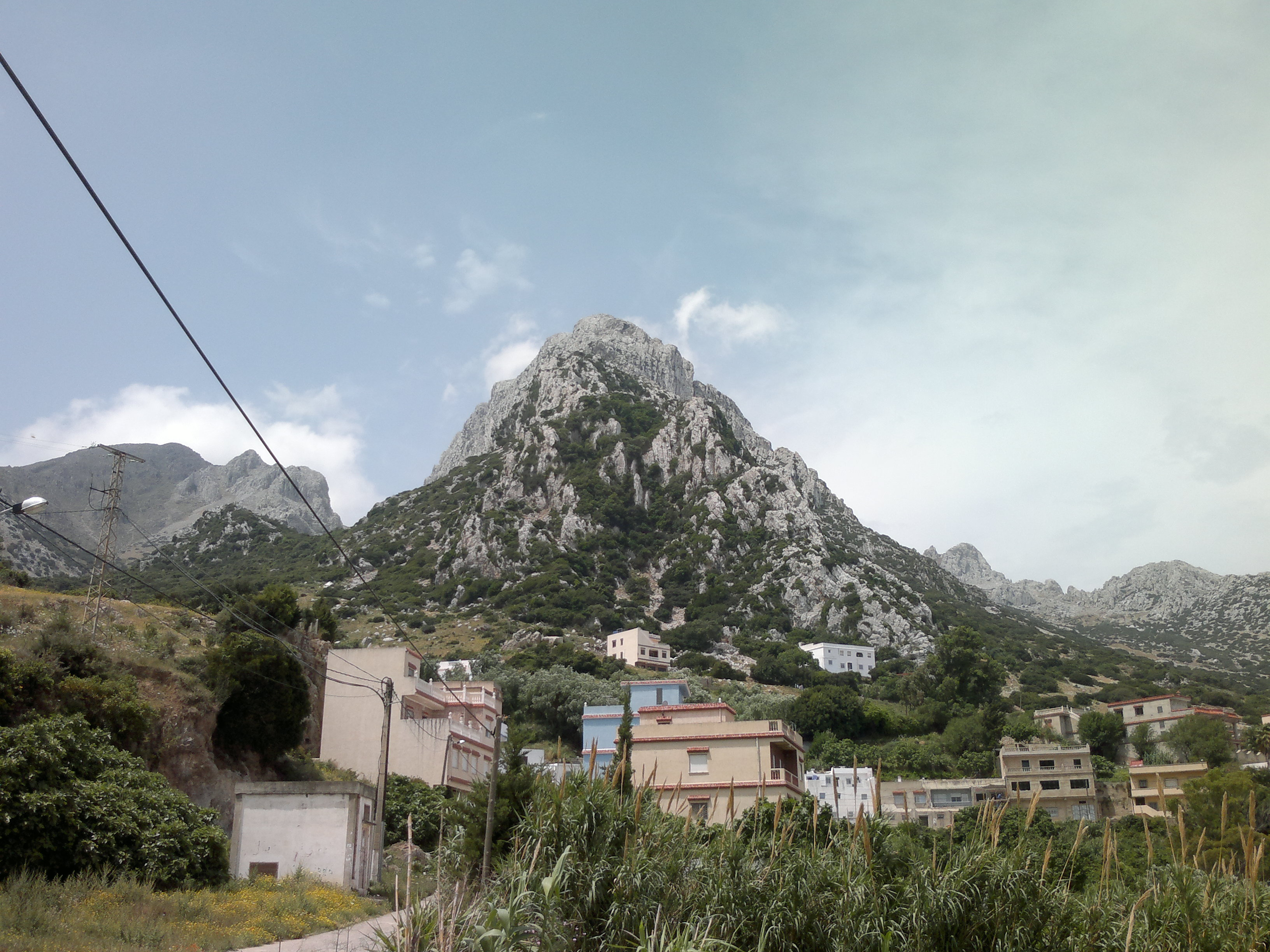
- Interactive map of Fahs-Anjra Province
- Coordinates: 35°40′N 5°31′W
- Country: Morocco
- Region: Tanger-Tetouan-Al Hoceima
- Capital: Anjra

Area
  - Total: 332 km^{2} (128 sq mi)

Population (2024)
  - Total: 100,789
  - Density: 304/km^{2} (786/sq mi)
- Time zone: UTC+0 (GMT)

Fahs-Anjra (Arabic: الفحص-أنجرة; Standard Moroccan Tamazight: ⵍⴼⴰⵃⵚ-ⴰⵏⵊⵔⴰ) is a province in the Tanger-Tetouan-Al Hoceima region of Morocco. It was created by royal decree in 2003. Its population was 100,789 in 2024.

A new city, Ch'rafate, was announced in 2009 as part of a development program in the region. The project has been under development since then.

== Subdivisions ==
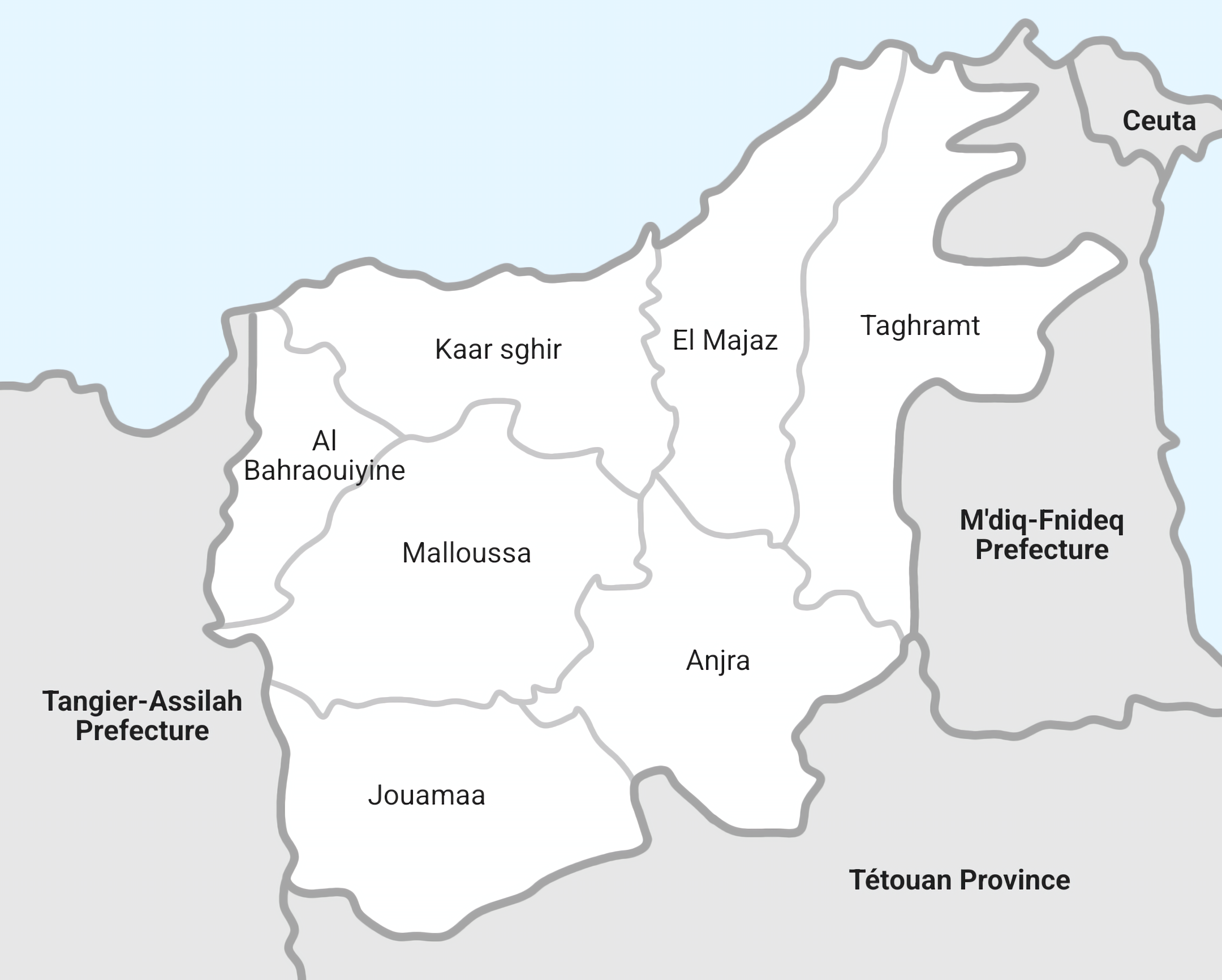
Communes of Fahs-Anjra Province

The prefecture is divided administratively into the following:

=== Rural communes ===
Name	Geographic code	Households (2024)	Population (2024)	Notes
Al Bahraoyine	227.05.01.	3912	15491	
Anjra	227.03.05.	3992	17251	Urban centre: Anjra (3,763 inhabitants; 899 households)
Jouamaa	227.03.11.	2416	10039	
Ksar El Majaz	227.03.13.	3437	12703	
Ksar Sghir	227.05.05.	4391	17125	
Malloussa	227.05.09.	4627	18854	
Taghramt	227.03.21.	2385	9326	
