= MV Guillaume de Normandie =

French operated Ferry

- Guillaume de Normandie entering Portsmouth Harbour

History
- Name: 2025–present: Guillaume de Normandie
- Namesake: Named after William the Conqueror
- Owner: 2024–2026: Stena RoRo; 2026–present: SOMANOR
- Operator: 2025–present: Brittany Ferries
- Port of registry: 2025–present: Morlaix, France
- Route: Portsmouth – Caen (Ouistreham)
- Ordered: 26 February 2021
- Builder: China Merchants Jinling Shipyard; Weihai, China
- Yard number: W0279
- Laid down: 28 September 2023
- Launched: 12 April 2024
- Christened: 28 March 2025
- Completed: December 2024
- Acquired: 23 December 2024
- Maiden voyage: 18 April 2025
- In service: 2025
- Identification: IMO number: 9946324; Call sign: FHYA; MMSI number: 228461800
- Status: in service
- Notes: Sister ship to Saint-Malo

General characteristics
- Class & type: Stena E-Flexer Class (Hybrid LNG Subclass)
- Tonnage: 36,668 GT; 5,200 DWT
- Length: 194.70 m (638 ft 9 in)
- Beam: 27.80 m (91 ft 2 in)
- Draught: 6.50 m (21 ft 4 in)
- Depth: 9.65 m (31 ft 8 in)
- Decks: 10
- Ramps: Bow and stern loading ramps
- Installed power: 2 × Wärtsilä 12V46DF dual-fuel (LNG / MDO) main engines (total 27,480 kW / 36,850 hp); Battery hybrid propulsion system & cold-ironing (shore power connection) capability
- Propulsion: 2 × controllable pitch propellers
- Speed: 23.0 knots (42.6 km/h; 26.5 mph) (service)
- Capacity: 1,310 passengers (220 cabins + 2 couchette plus lounges); 460 cars / 2,219 lane metres for freight
- Crew: 90–110

MV Guillaume de Normandie is a roll-on/roll-off ferry owned by SOMANOR and operated by Brittany Ferries. She serves on a route between Portsmouth and Caen (Ouistreham). She was built at the China Merchants Jinling Shipyard, Weihai.

== History ==
The Guillaume de Normandie was built at the China Merchants Jinling Shipyard (formerly AVIC) in Weihai and is the final ship in the E-Flexer-class ferry series to be delivered to Brittany Ferries. Construction began with the cutting of the first piece of steel on 6 February 2024, followed by the keel laying on 7 October 2024.

The Guillaume de Normandie made its first passenger crossing for Brittany Ferries on 18 April 2025, directly replacing the Normandie in the fleet, which had operated between Portsmouth and Caen since 1992. A number of decorations from the Normandie were transferred across to the new ship, and her restaurant still bears the name "Riva Bella".

== Design ==
Unlike its near-sister ship Saint-Malo, Guillaume de Normandie does not have an extra passenger deck, instead opting for an additional garage deck, providing more capacity for freight vehicles. This design choice reflects its primary function of connecting Portsmouth and Caen, a route heavily frequented by both tourists and freight transport. The interior design of the vessel reflects the Normandy region, featuring bright colors inspired by its landscapes and architectural elements that mirror the local style.

As a hybrid LNG ship, Guillaume de Normandie is designed to operate with reduced environmental impact compared to traditional vessels. The ship utilizes dual-fuel engines, specifically two Wärtsilä W12V46DF engines with a combined power of 27,480 kW/HP, allowing it to run on both liquefied natural gas (LNG) and marine diesel oil (MDO). This flexible fuel capability contributes to lower emissions and improved fuel efficiency.

Guillaume de Normandie is named after William the Conqueror) and the cultural links to the area do not stop there, Its interiors are inspired by the region of Normandy with bright colours to represent the landscape and the interior design mirroring the architectural style of the region. Its design differs slightly from its near sister ship, Saint-Malo, with it lacking the extra passenger deck in favour of an extra garage deck capable of holding freight. They are the two largest hybrid ferries operating in europe as of present.
