= Panagia Chrysopigi =

- Παναγία Χρυσοπηγή
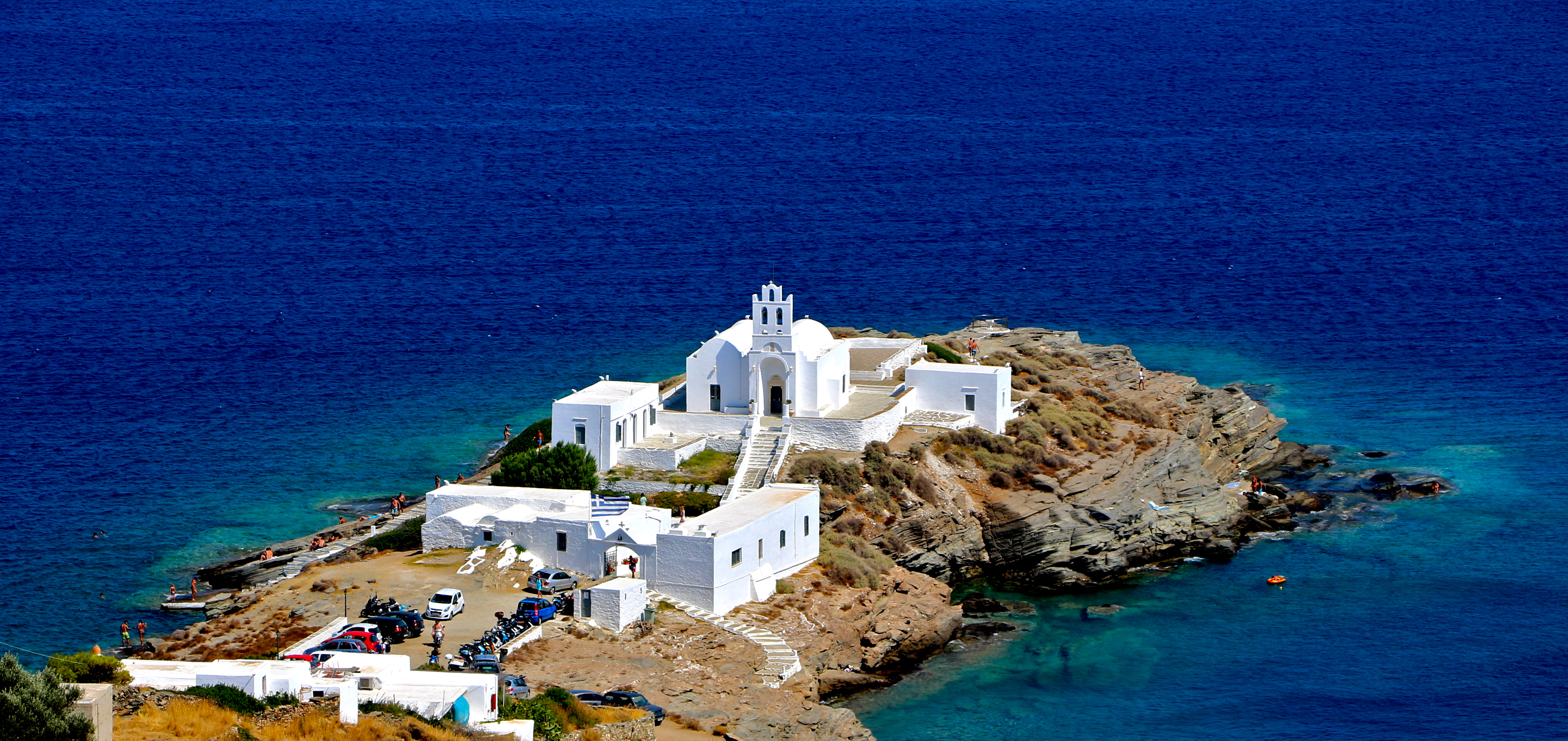

Monastery information
- Established: 17th century
- Diocese: Metropolis of Syros

Site
- Location: Platis Gialos, Sifnos
- Country: Greece
- Coordinates: 36°56′11″N 24°44′47″E

The Panagia Chrysopigi (Greek: Παναγία Χρυσοπηγή) is a former monastery built on a promontory on the southeast coast of Sifnos. In the past there was a share of the Vrysis monastery and the oldest references to the monastery date back to the 17th century. The monastery is connected with many legends of the island. The building complex of the former monastery includes, beyond the church, some rectangular buildings, such as the refectory. The single-aisled church bears an inscription from 1757, when the church was probably rebuilt.

== Location ==
Panagia Chrysopigi is built on a small promontory on the southeast coast of Sifnos, near the fishing settlement of Faros, which in the past was probably the main port of the island. The cape is 400 meters long and 100 meters wide and is separated from the rest of the island by a narrow gap and connected to the rest of the island by a bridge.

== History ==
The earliest mention of Panagia Chrysopigi is in a manuscript of the monk Parthenios Hairetis, which was dated by Theodosis Sperantzas in 1676 or 1677. The manuscript describes the miracles of Panagia Chrysopigi, such as the splitting of the rock and the history of Panagia Chrysopigi. The manuscript indicates that the oldest surviving buildings are the old refectory and the cells next to it, which were built in 1675 by Pope Hieronymus Zambelis together with the monastery's catholicon. The monk Parthenios states that this temple was built on the site of a temple which was three cubits long and then extended, which in turn was built on the site of an even older temple. The current church, according to a wall inscription, dates from 1757.

The monastery came into the possession of the Stavropigian monastery of Vrysis in 1760 after a purchase and is mentioned as a Stavropigian share in a seal of 1798. In the period 1890–1900, additional cells were built and they bear built-in inscriptions with the names of the Sifnians Proveleggio and Dekavalle, who probably financed their construction. In 1923 a new dining room was built, which was then divided into separate rooms. In 1964, Panagia Chrysopigi was appointed patron of Sifnos.

== Building complex ==
Unlike other monasteries, Panagia Chrysopigi is not surrounded by a wall and the buildings are arranged freely and at different levels due to the slope of the ground. Beyond the main entrance, there are many secondary ones, such as those from the cliffs at sea level. The complex is split in two by the fissure, with the church and some cells being on the rock and the other cairns and refectory on land, but at a lower level. All the buildings are small in size.

== Church ==
The church is a single-chamber vaulted roof, with the entrance on the western facade. The vaulted ceiling is internally reinforced by half-meter-wide slings which are supported on stone piers. The inner walls have apsides, of which the middle apse on the south wall is deeper, greater than the thickness of the wall, forming a small transept measuring 1.5 by 2 meters. A grave may have been located there in the past. The arch of the temple is slightly pointed. The niche of the sanctuary is approximately semicircular. The floor of the church is covered with marble slabs and on it in front of the iconostasis is carved a double-headed eagle, which dates from 1801 to 1816.

The entrance to the temple has a marble frame decorated with waves, rosettes and furousaki, probably of Venetian influence. In the lintel there is a recess with a fresco. Above the entrance rises the spire of the church, which is bilobed. It rests on two pilasters, which form the front of the entrance. Above the entrance, two plaques have been built in, one with the date 1757 and the other with Russian and Mrs.

In contact with the north wall of the church are two vaulted rooms of equal width which do not communicate with the church or with each other. They have entrances on the east and west facades. The entrance to the west facade is decorated with rosettes and has a marble frame. The use of the rooms is not known. It is considered unlikely that they were cells due to their location and perhaps housed altars for Catholics.

== Other buildings ==
On land are the old bank, built in 1675, and the newer bank, built in 1923, and some of the cells. These buildings are relatively close to each other, enclosing a courtyard. A staircase then leads to the islet, where the temple and two other cell buildings are located. The staircase is in the same line as the entrance to the church and the entrance to the monastery, defining the axis along which the monastery develops. All the buildings are built of stone. The cells on land are vaulted, while the other buildings have wooden ceilings. Above the small windows are cornices, as is customary in the architecture of the island.

== Sources ==
- Τζάκου, Αναστασία (1979). "Η Παναγία η Χρυσοπηγή Σίφνου". Εκκλησίες στην Ελλάδα μετά την Άλωση. Vol. 1. Εθνικό Μετσόβιο Πολυτεχνείο.
