= Eschatia =

Eschatia (Ancient Greek: Ἐσχατιά) was an ancient town on the island of Siphnos in what is today Greece. It is attested in ancient inscriptions.

Its site is tentatively located on Siphnos.
