= Artemonas (Sifnos) =

Artemonas Αρτεμώνας
- Community
- Location within Greece
- Coordinates: 36°58′38″N 24°43′55″E
- Country: Greece
- Administrative region: South Aegean
- Regional unit: Milos
- Municipality: Sifnos
- Municipal unit: Sifnos
- Elevation: 260 m (850 ft)

Population (2021)
  - Community: 879
- Time zone: UTC+2 (EET)
  - Summer (DST): UTC+3 (EEST)
- Area code: +30-22840

Artemonas is a village on the island of Sifnos, Greece. It is the seat of the homonymous community, which also includes the villages Agia Marina, Troulaki and Cherronisos. It is the second largest village of the island after Apollonia. It is named after the goddess Artemis of the Greek mythology.
