= Januli I da Corogna =

Januli I da Corogna was the first autonomous lord of the Aegean island of Sifnos.

As his name reveals, Januli da Corogna probably hailed from Coruña, and was a Knight Hospitaller. In 1307, he seized the island of Sifnos, renounced his allegiance to the Knights, and declared himself its lord. Like most of the Cyclades, Sifnos had come under the Sanudo-ruled Duchy of the Archipelago in the aftermath of the Fourth Crusade. It was then recovered for the Byzantine Empire by the adventurer Licario in the 1270s, and remained under Byzantine control until captured by Januli. The Sanudo Dukes of the Archipelago, who considered the island rightfully theirs, protested Januli's action, but in vain. The Corogna family continued to hold the island as an independent lordship until 1456, when it passed to the Gozzadini family, who in turn ruled it until it was annexed by the Ottoman Empire in 1617.

== Sources ==
- Freely, John (2006). The Cyclades: Discovering the Greek Islands of the Aegean. I.B.Tauris. ISBN 1845111605.
- Miller, William (1908). The Latins in the Levant, a History of Frankish Greece (1204–1566). New York: E.P. Dutton and Company.
