= Kamares, Sifnos =

Kamares Καμάρες
- Settlement
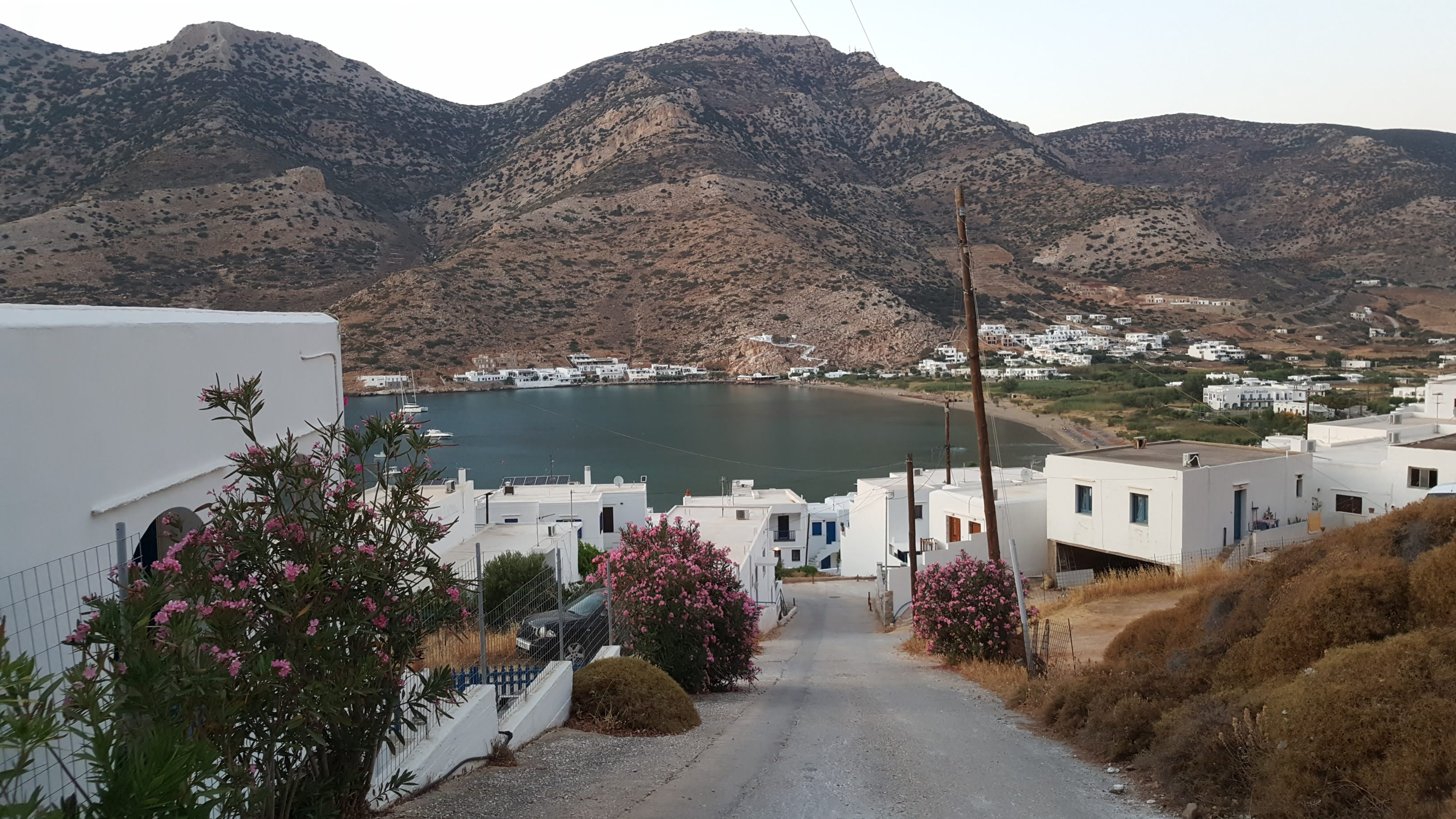

- Location within Greece
- Coordinates: 36°59′19″N 24°40′33″E
- Country: Greece
- Administrative region: South Aegean
- Regional unit: Milos
- Municipality: Sifnos
- Community: Apollonia

Population (2021)
  - Total: 319
- Time zone: UTC+2 (EET)
  - Summer (DST): UTC+3 (EEST)

Kamares (Greek: Καμάρες) is a village and the main port for the island of Sifnos, Greece. Kamares is situated in the western side of the island on a natural harbor. The village has a large beach with many restaurants and hotels. The buildings in Kamares form a U-shape around the bay, with most restaurants and shops being directly on the water, and typically the hotels and houses on the hill above them. Visitors to the island arrive via the ferry terminal in the harbor; nearby bus service connects Kamares to the other villages of Sifnos.

== Gallery ==
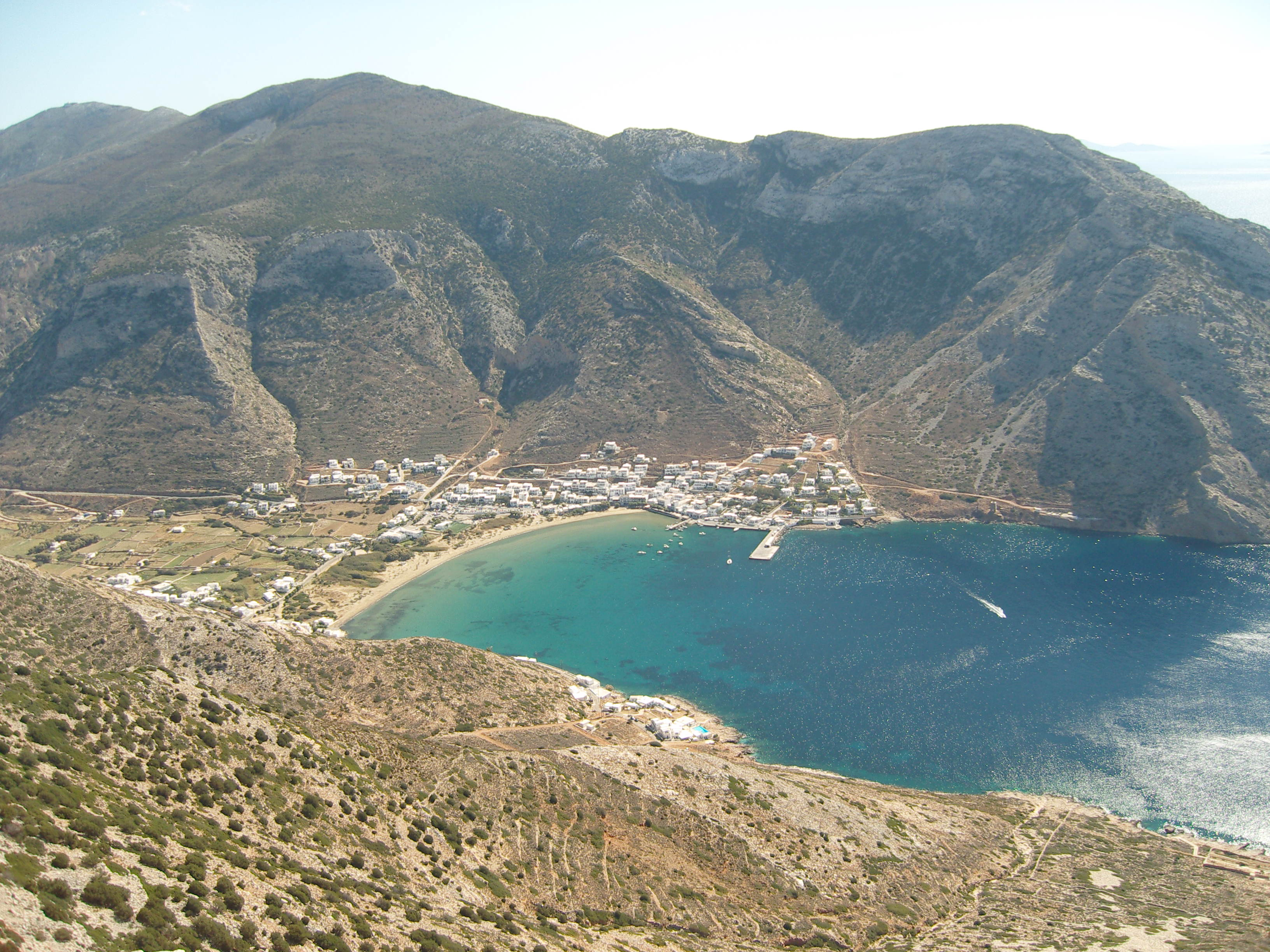
Bay of Kamares

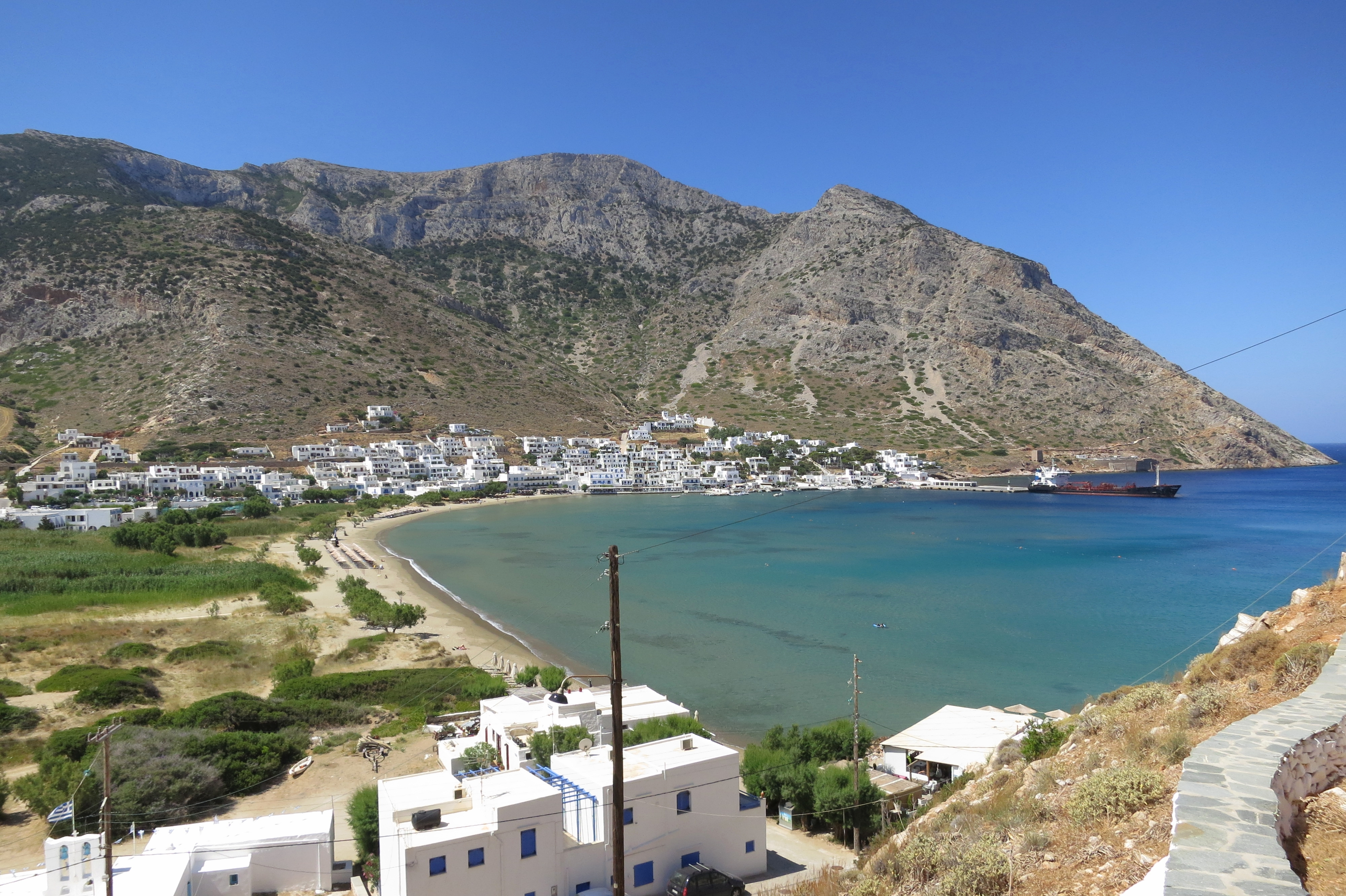
View from Agia Marina Church

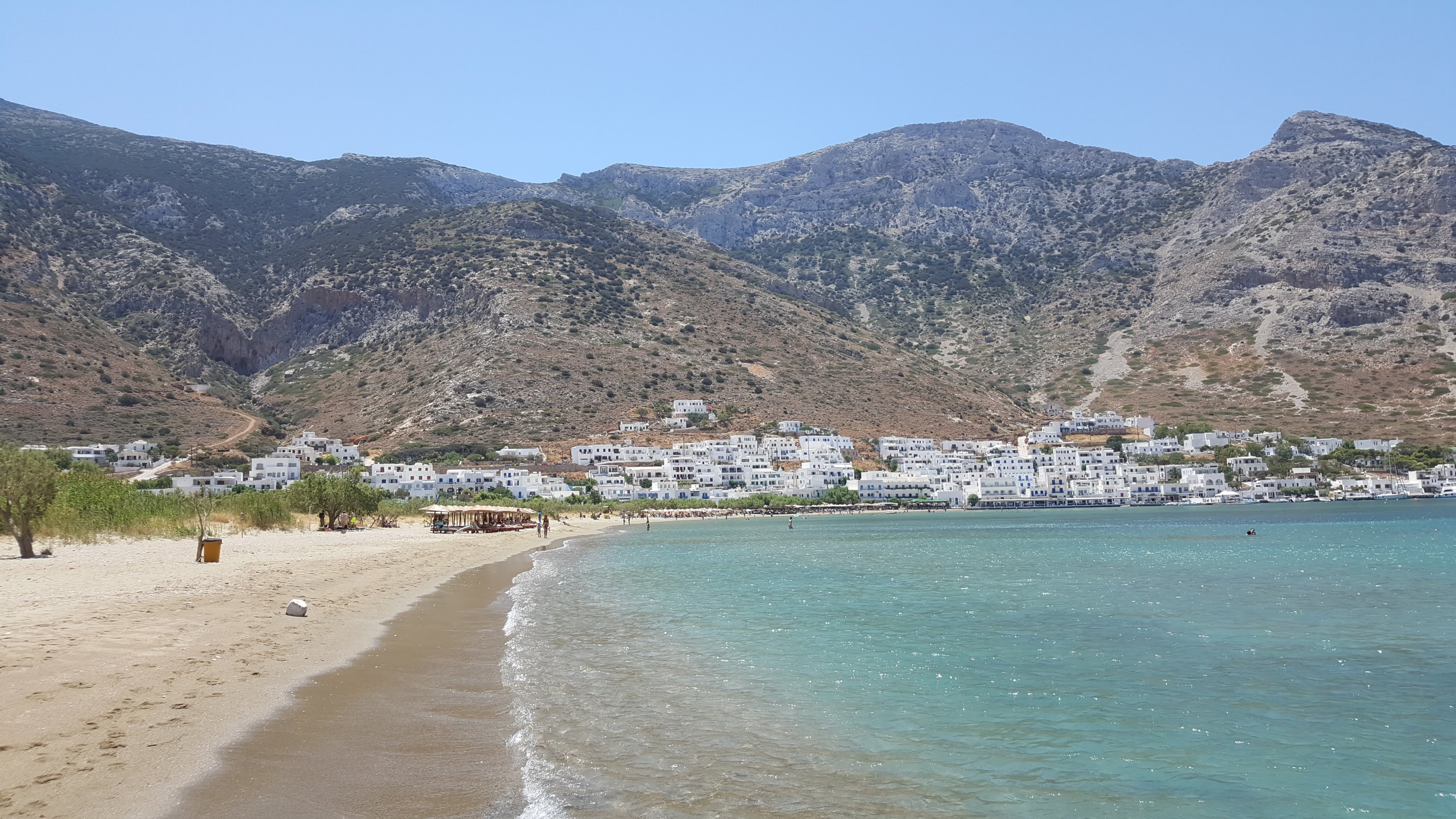
Beach at Noon

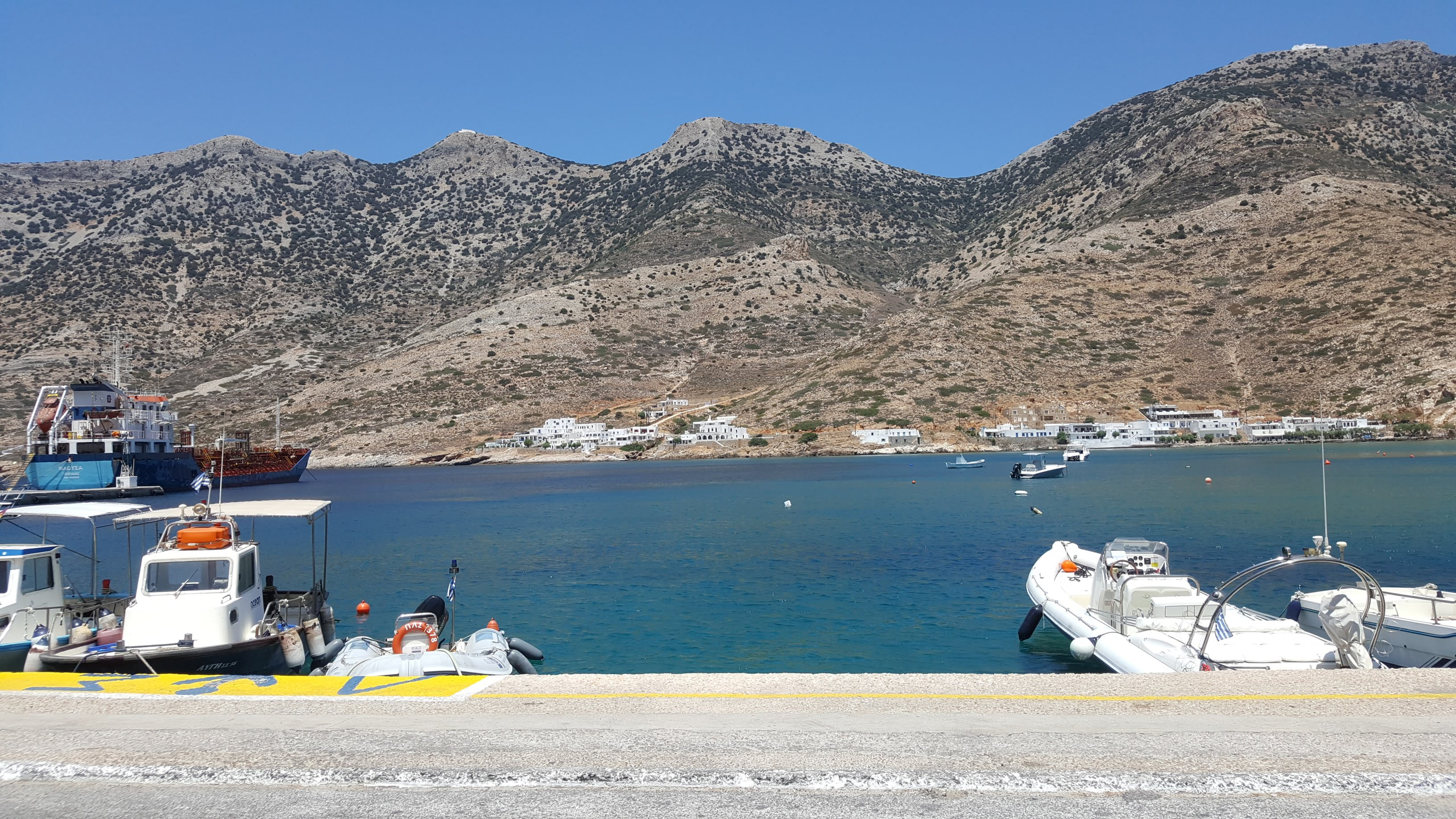
Portside

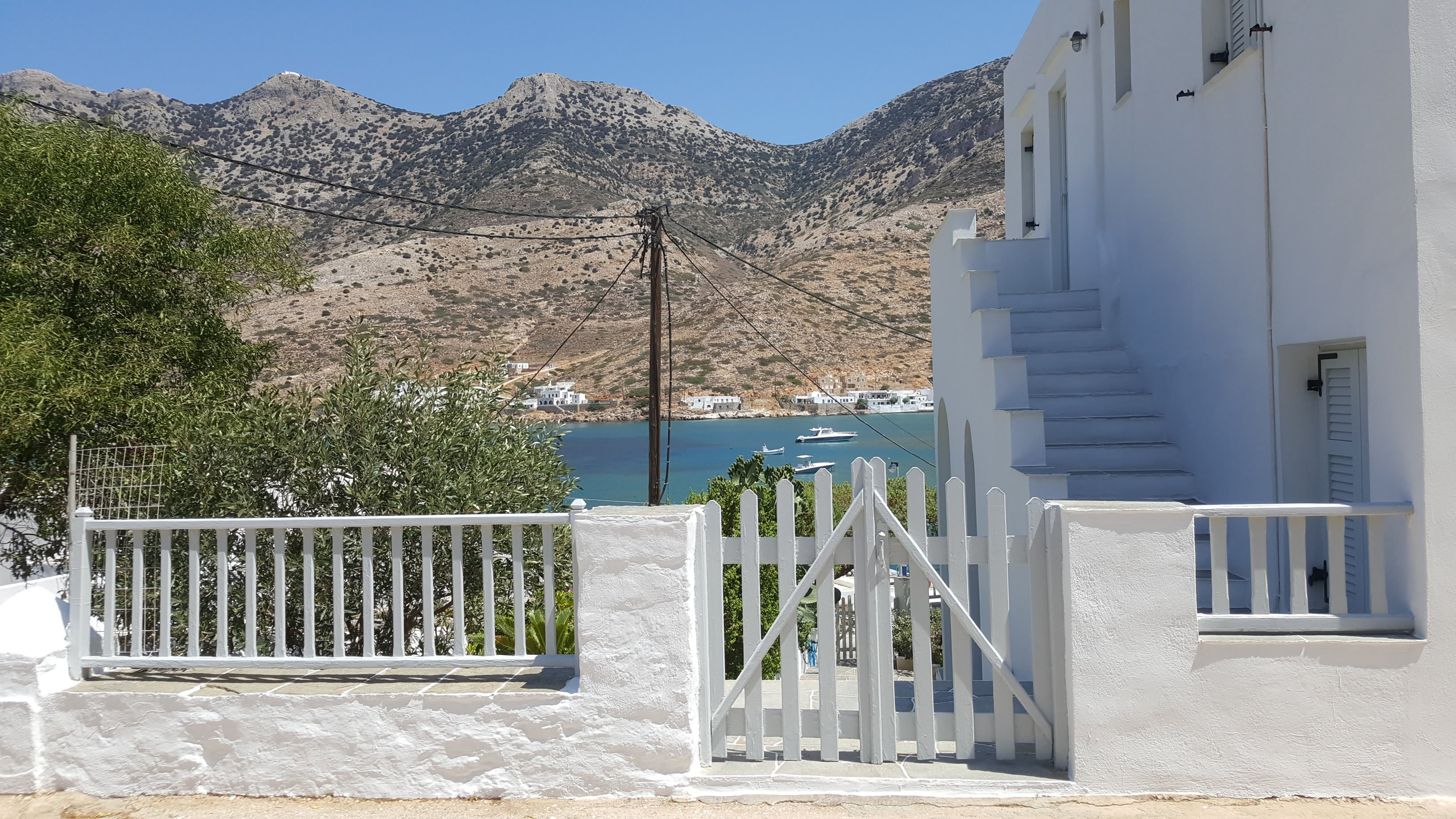
Noon Street

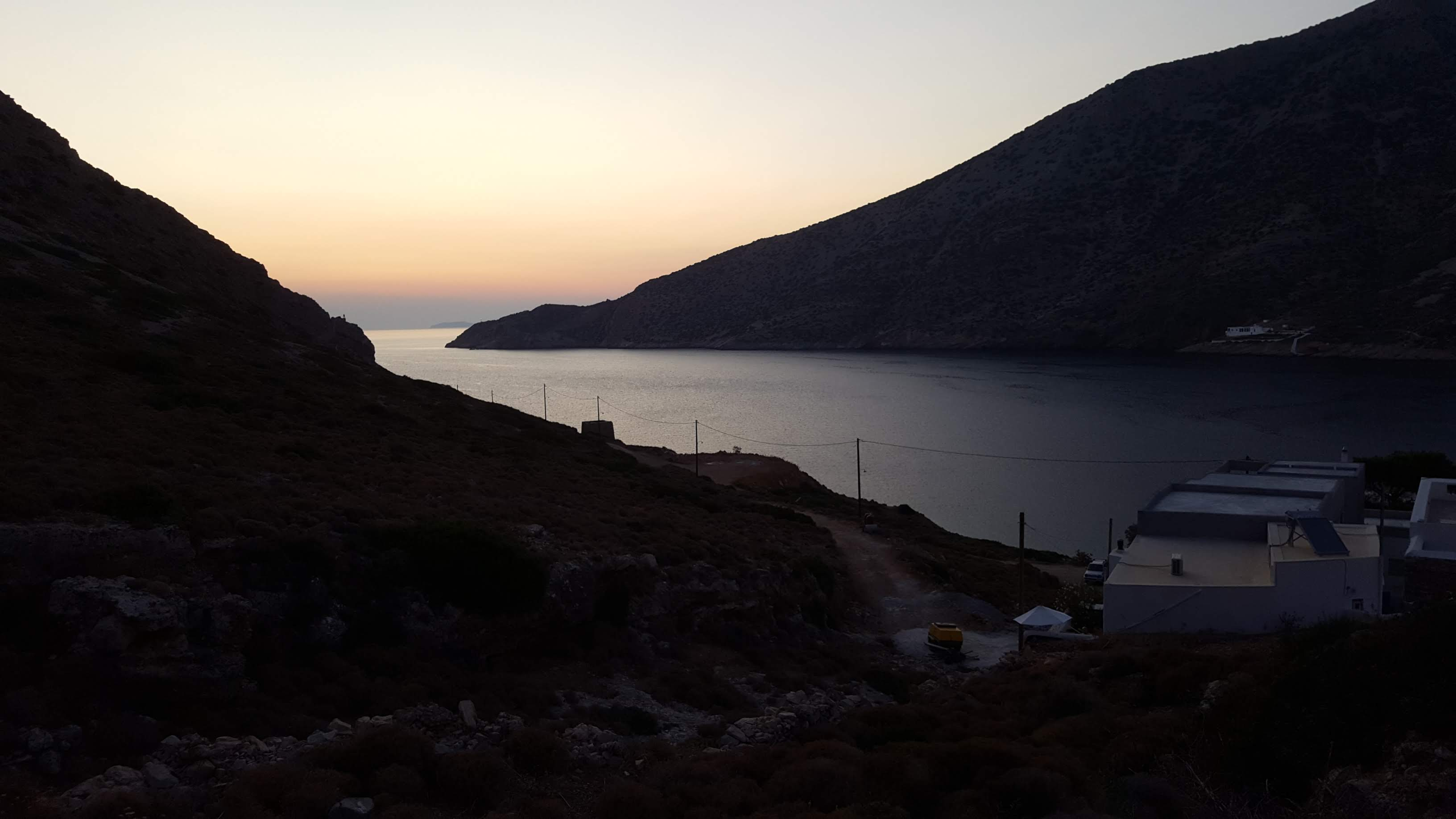
Kamares Bay, Sunset

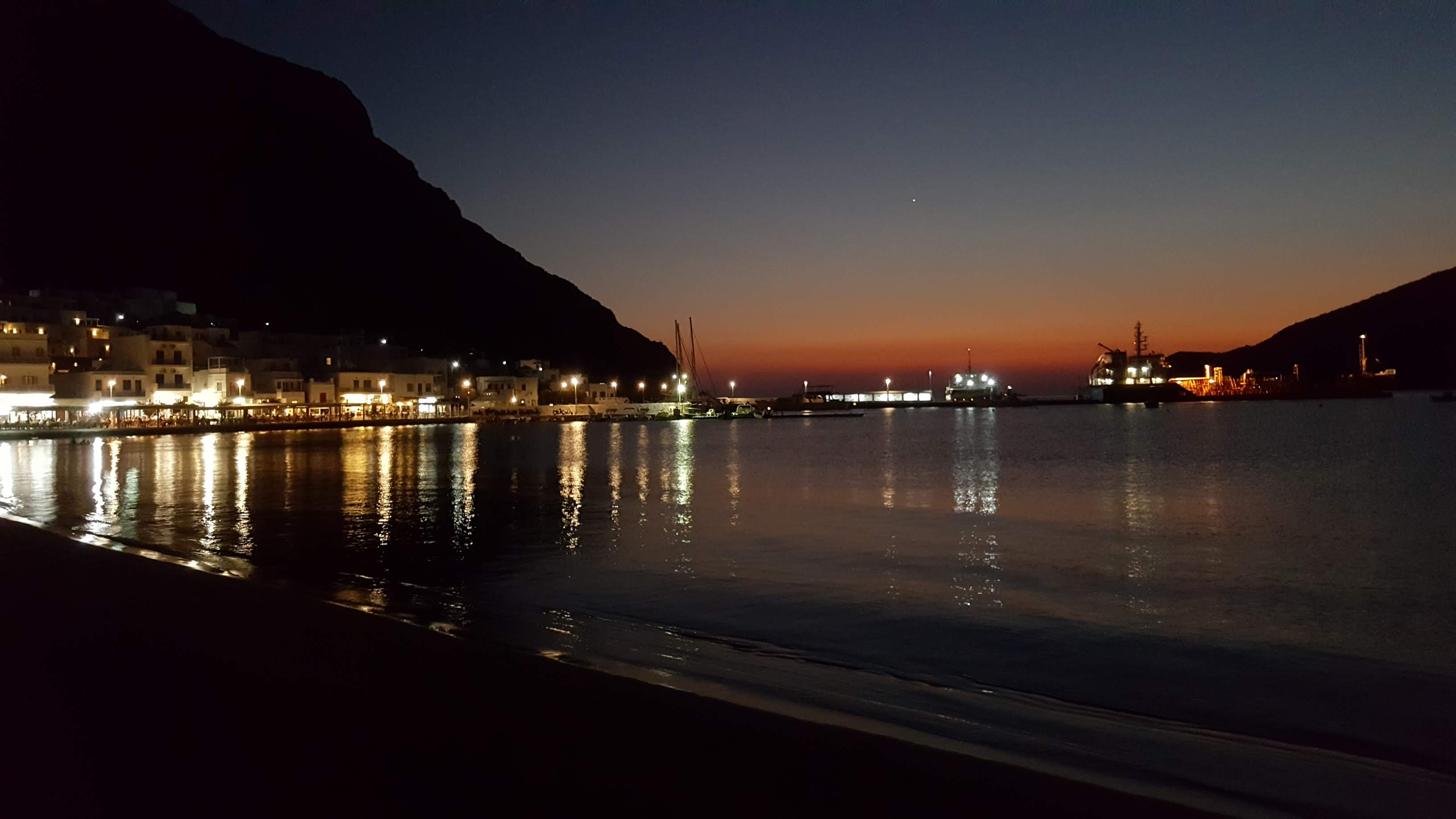
Beach After Sunset
