= Sifnos =

Island municipality in Greece

Sifnos Σίφνος
- Municipality
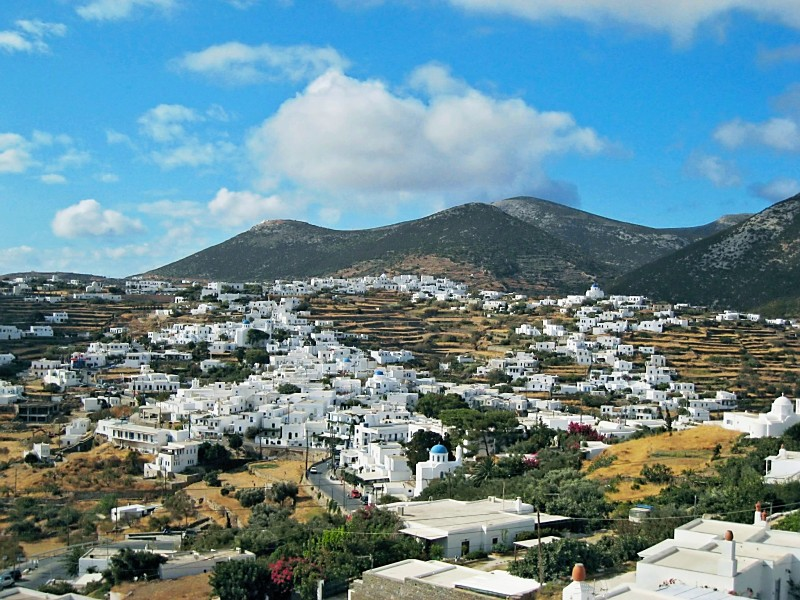
- Villages of Apollonia and Katavathi seen from Ano Petali

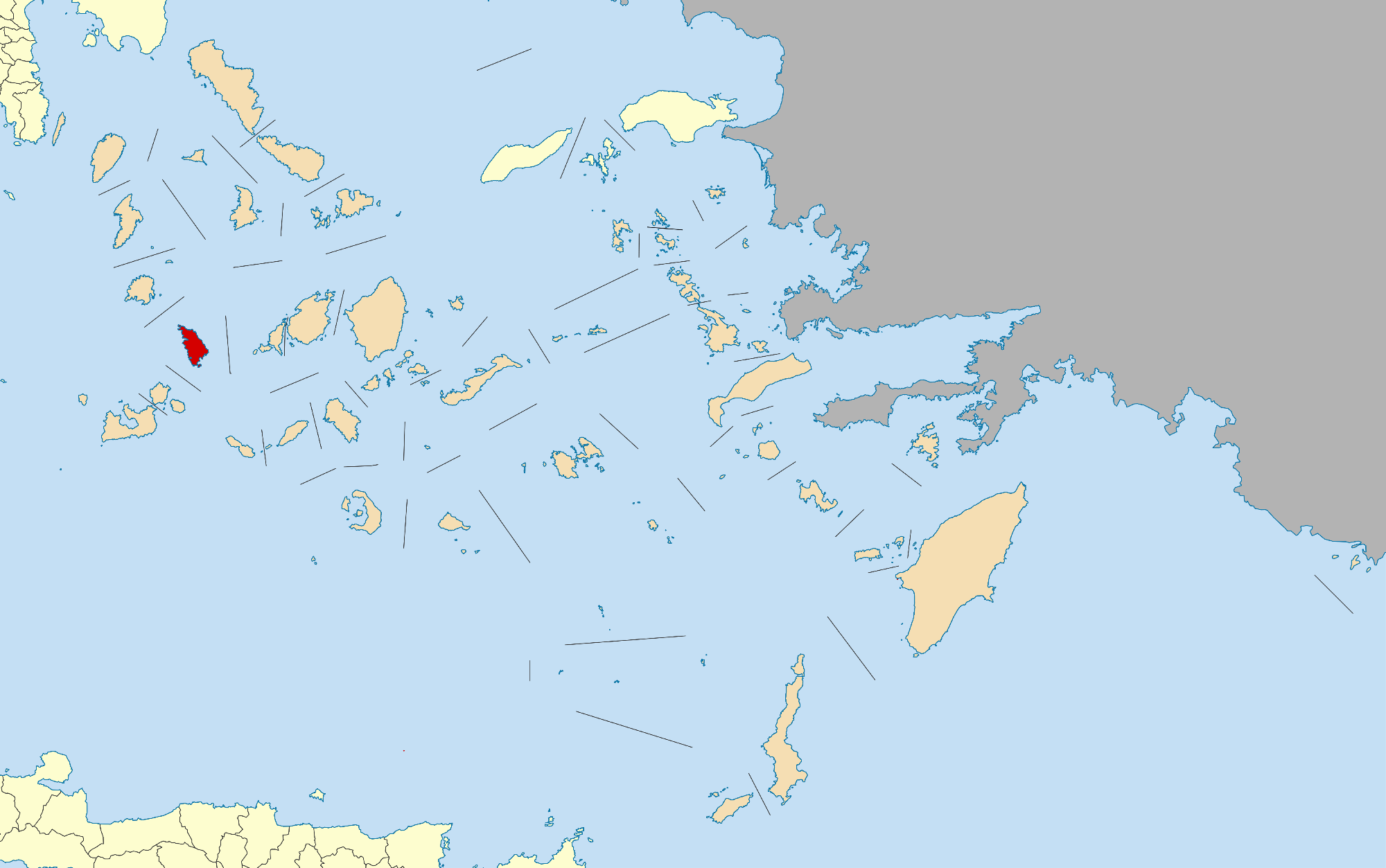

- Location within Greece
- Coordinates: 36°59′21″N 24°40′7″E
- Country: Greece
- Administrative region: South Aegean
- Regional unit: Milos
- Seat: Apollonia

Government
  - Mayor: Maria Nadali (since 2019)

Area
  - Municipality: 73.94 km^{2} (28.55 sq mi)
- Highest elevation: 679 m (2,228 ft)
- Lowest elevation: 0 m (0 ft)

Population (2021)
  - Municipality: 2,777
  - Density: 37.56/km^{2} (97.27/sq mi)
- Time zone: UTC+2 (EET)
  - Summer (DST): UTC+3 (EEST)
- Postal code: 840 03
- Area code: 22840
- Vehicle registration: EM
- Website: www.sifnos.gr

Sifnos (Greek: Σίφνος) is an island municipality in the Cyclades island group in Greece. The main town, near the center, known as Apollonia (pop. 918 as of 2021), is home of the island's folklore museum and library. The town's name is thought to come from an ancient temple of Apollo on the site of the church of Panayia Yeraniofora. The second-largest town is Artemonas, thought to be named after an ancient temple of Apollo's sister Artemis, located at the site of the church of Panayia Kokhi. The village of Kastro, was the capital of the island during ancient times until 1836. It is built on top of a high cliff on the island's east shore and today has extensive medieval remains and is the location of the island's archeological museum. The port settlement, on the west coast of the island is known as Kamares.

== Geography ==
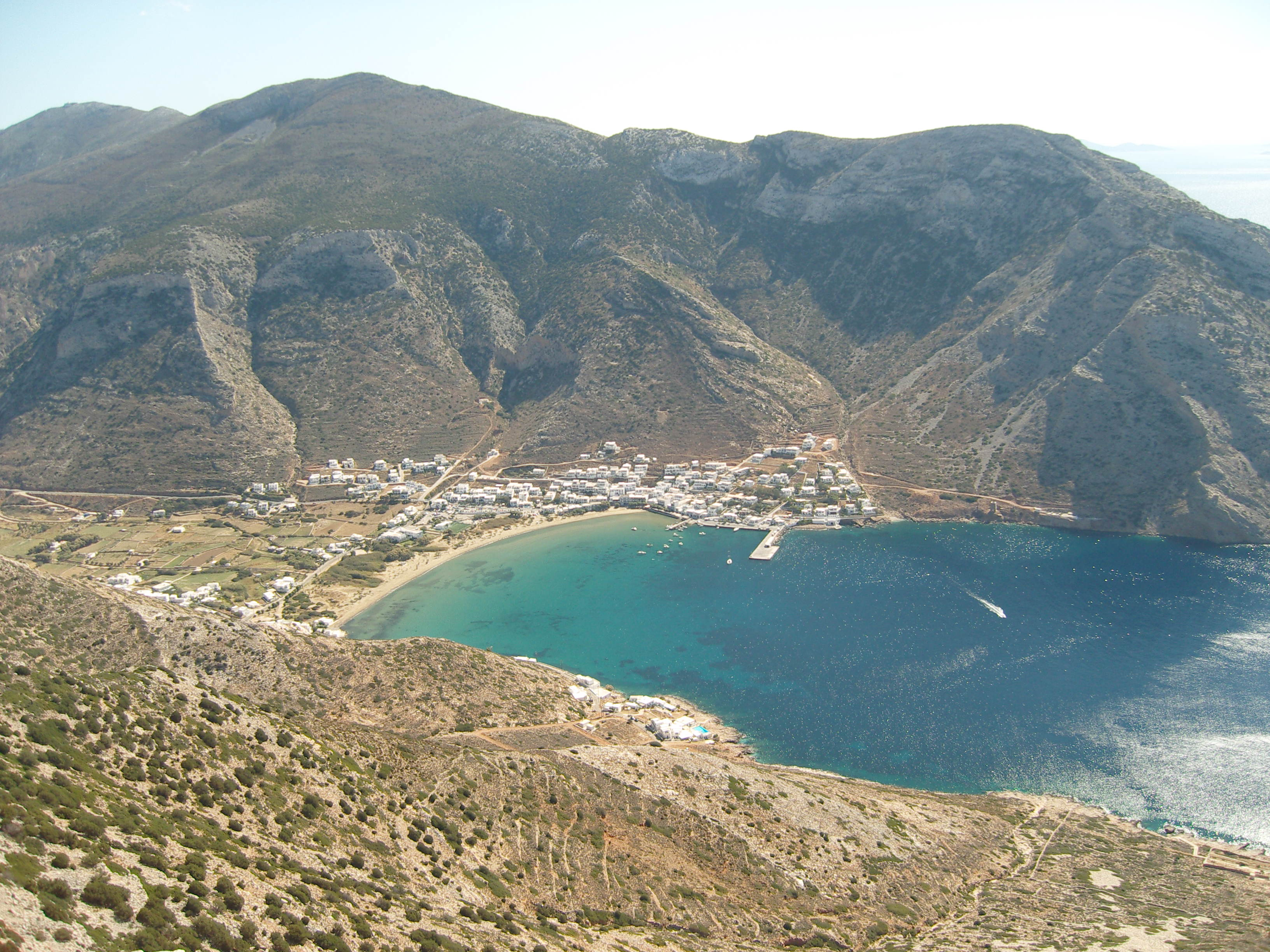
Bay of Kamares

Sifnos lies in the Cyclades between Serifos and Milos, west of Delos and Paros, about 130 km (81 mi) (80 nautical miles) from Piraeus (Athens' port). The municipality has an area of 73.942 square kilometres (28.549 sq mi) and is 15 km (9 mi) long and 7.5 km (4.7 mi) wide. It has a shoreline of 70 km (43 mi), with a permanent population of 2,625. The island is served by the ferries which run on the Piraeus – Kythnos – Serifos – Sifnos – Milos – Kimolos line and via Naxos. There are also infrequent sailings to other islands in the Cyclades.

To the south of the island, about 350 meters from the coast there is an uninhabited island, Kitriani.

== History ==
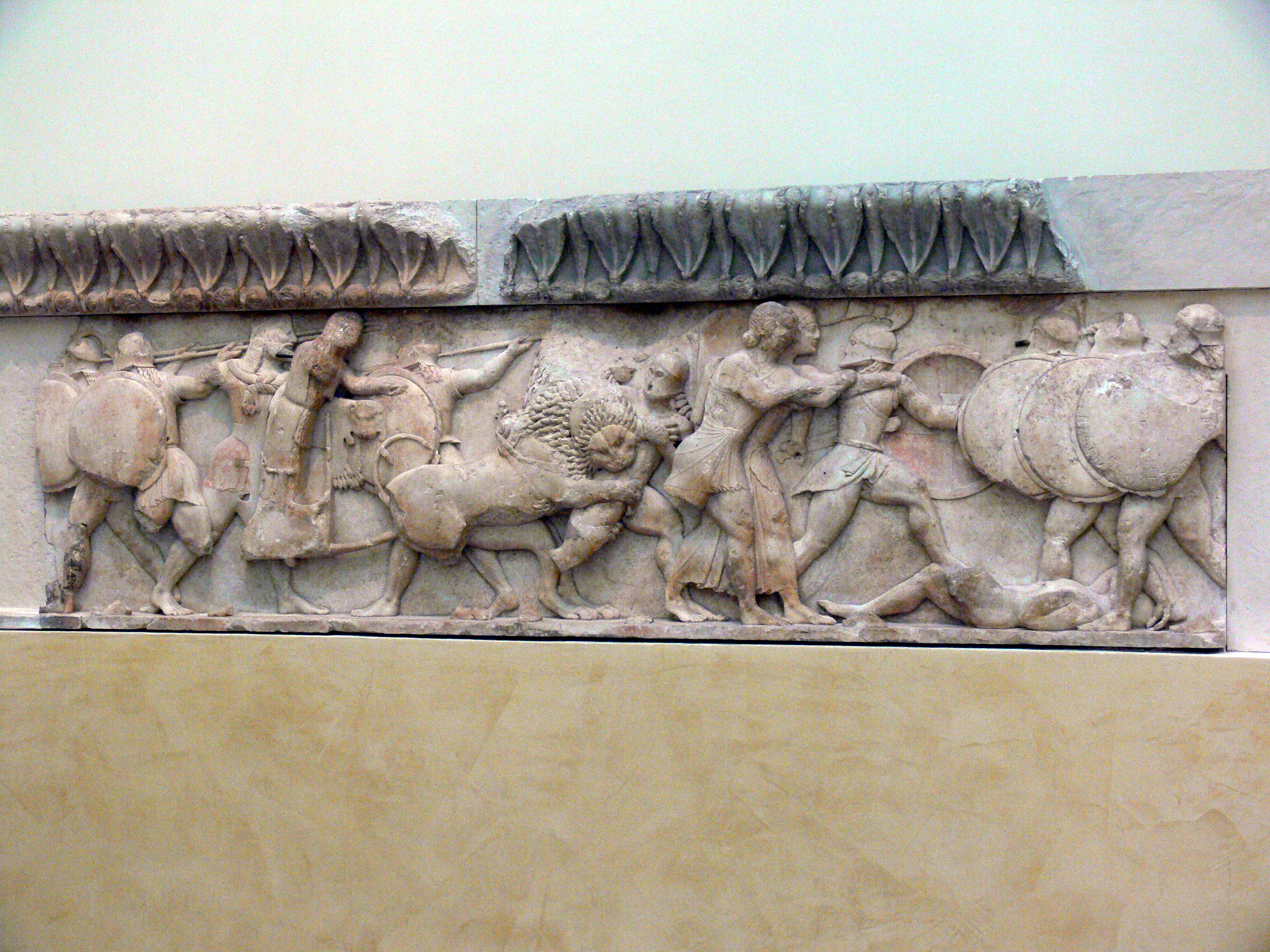
Frieze of the Siphnian Treasury in Delphi

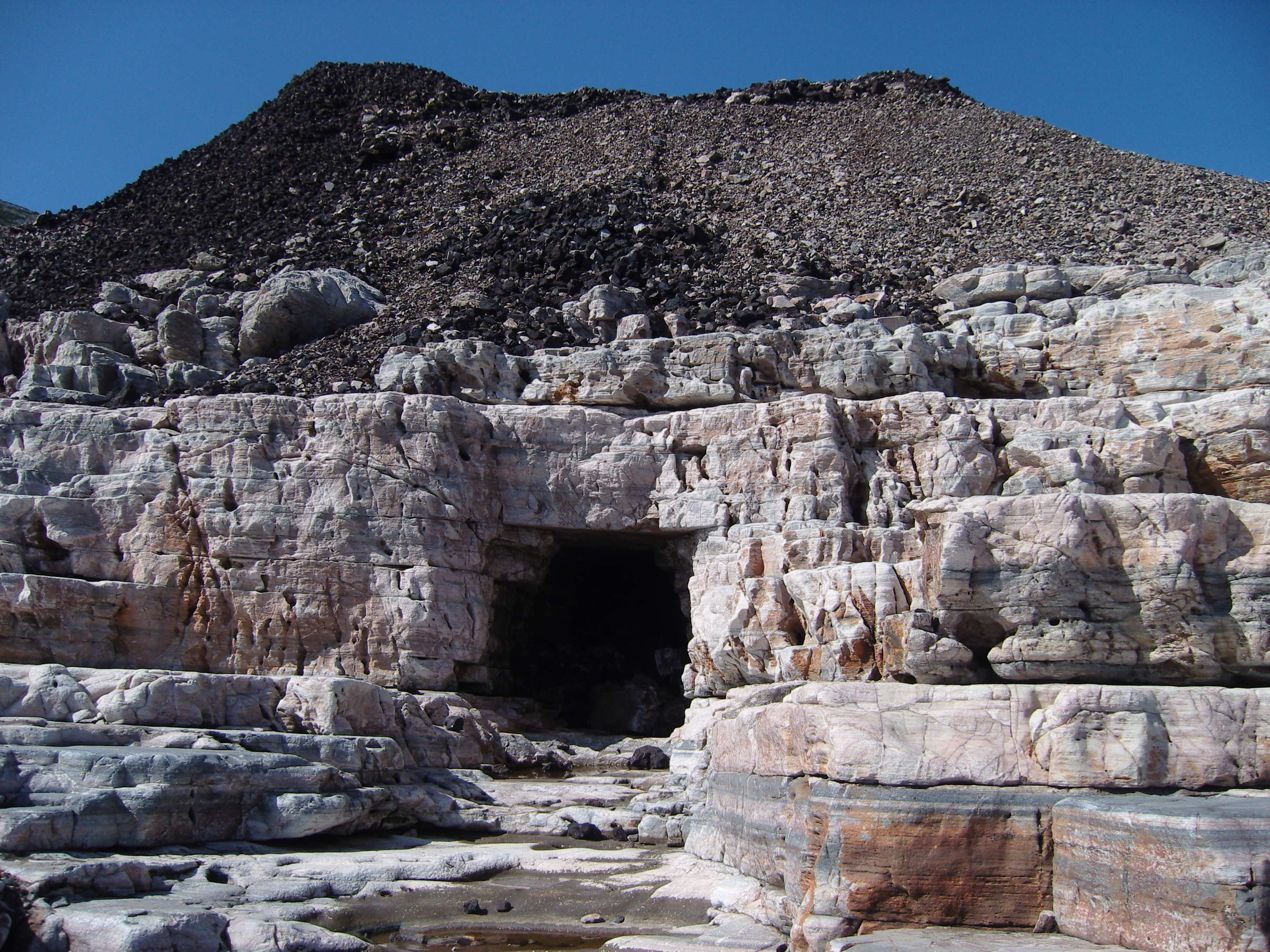
Entrance of a mine

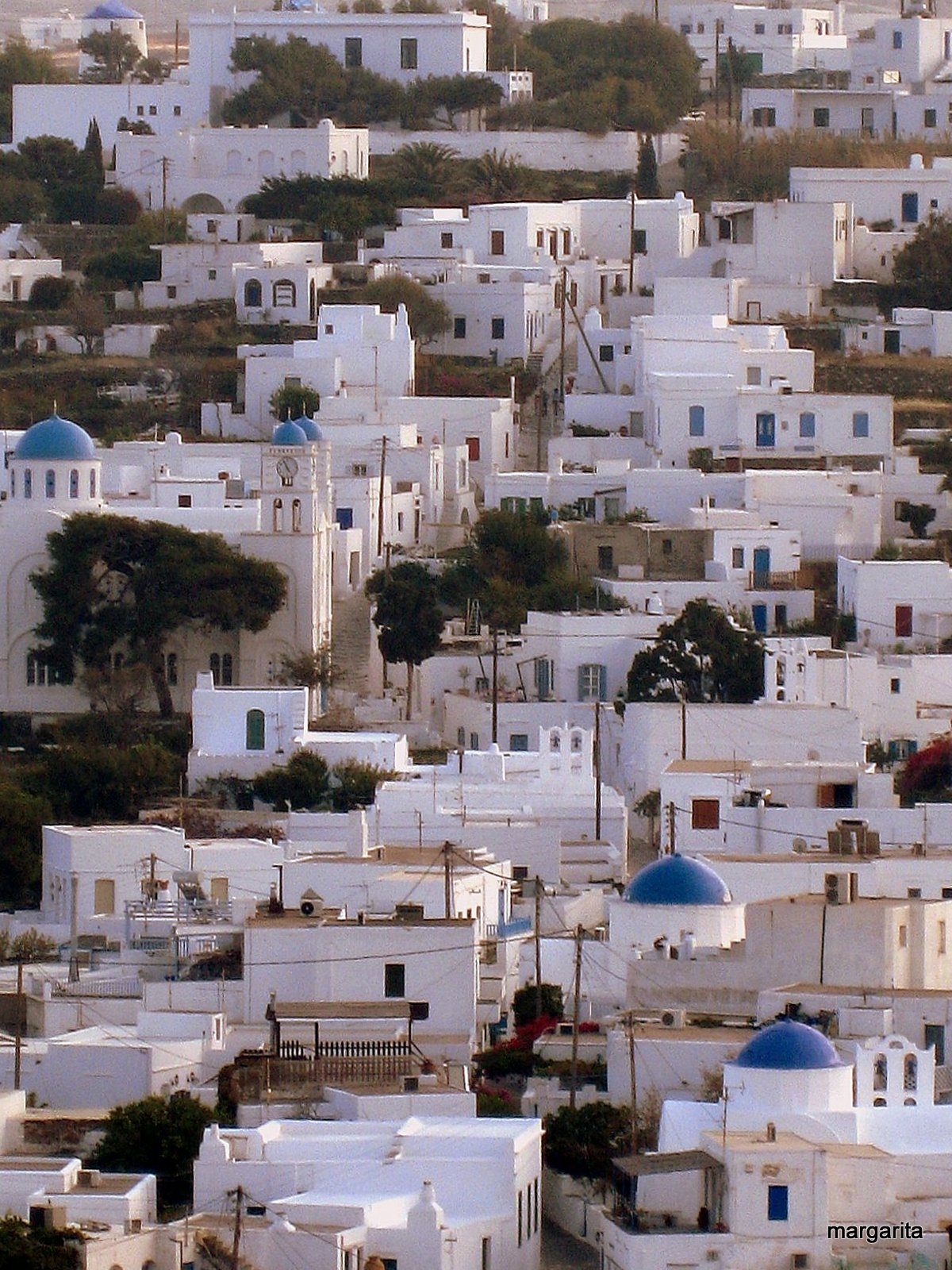
Apollonia

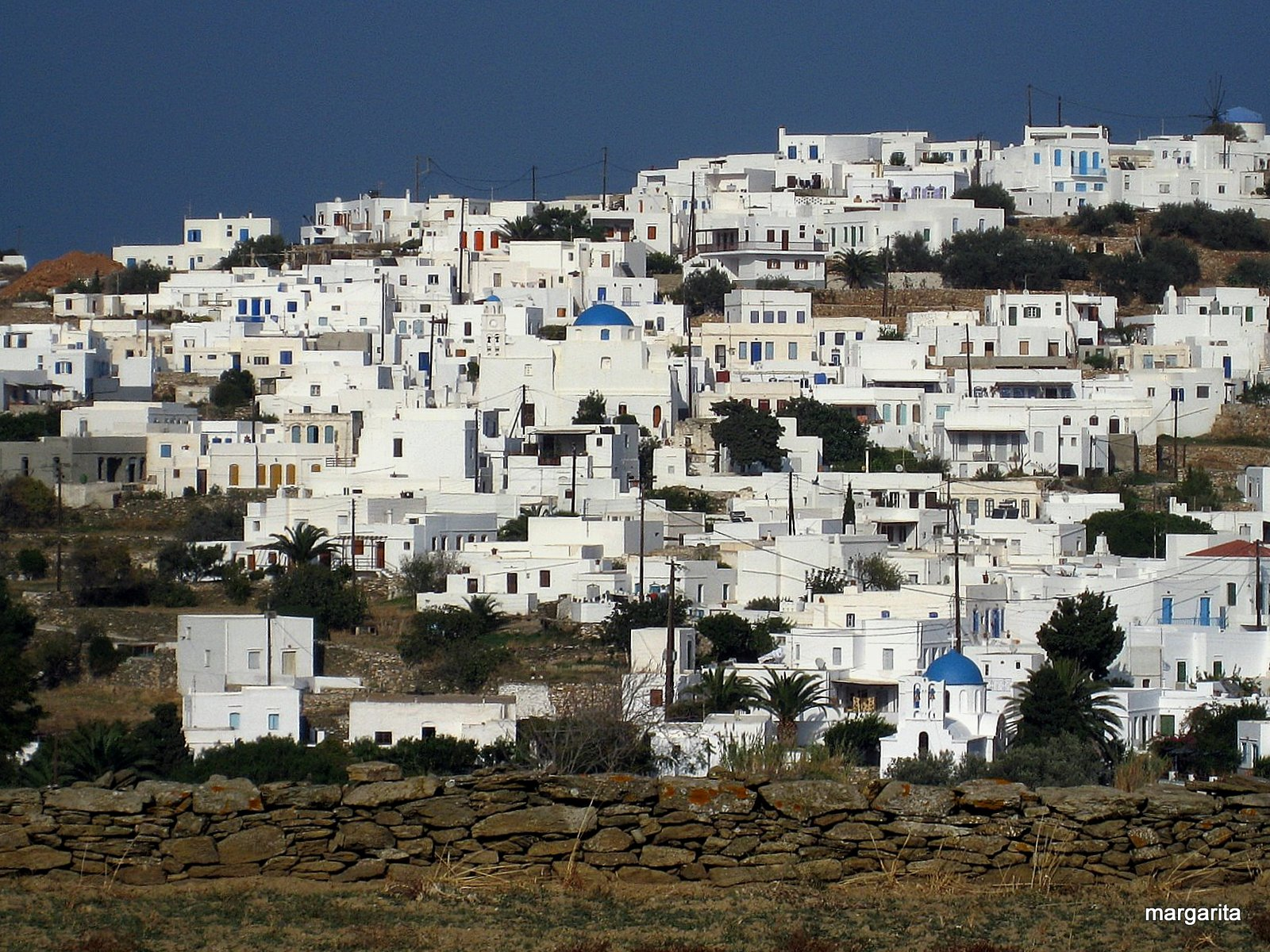
Artemonas

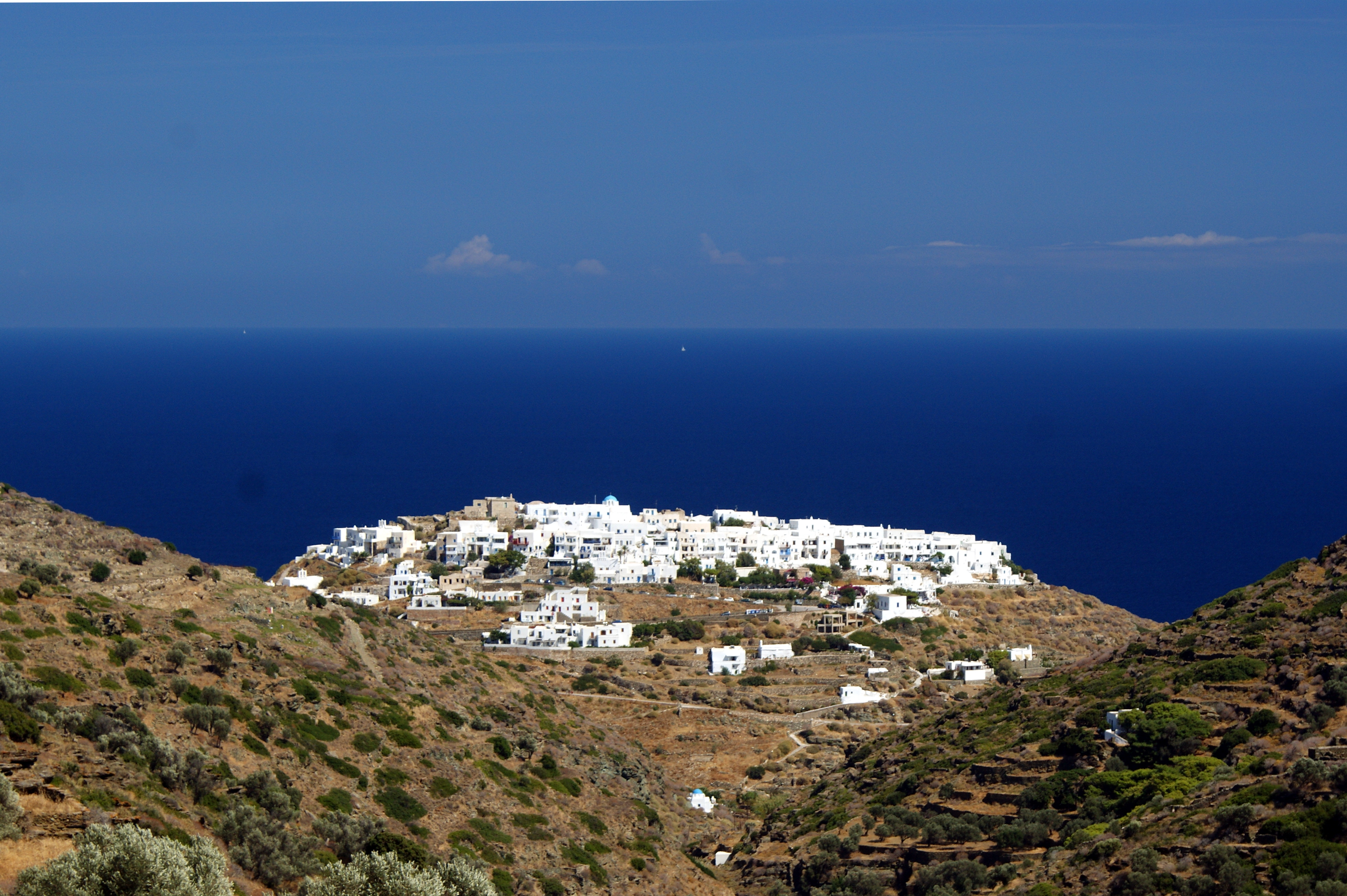
Kastro village

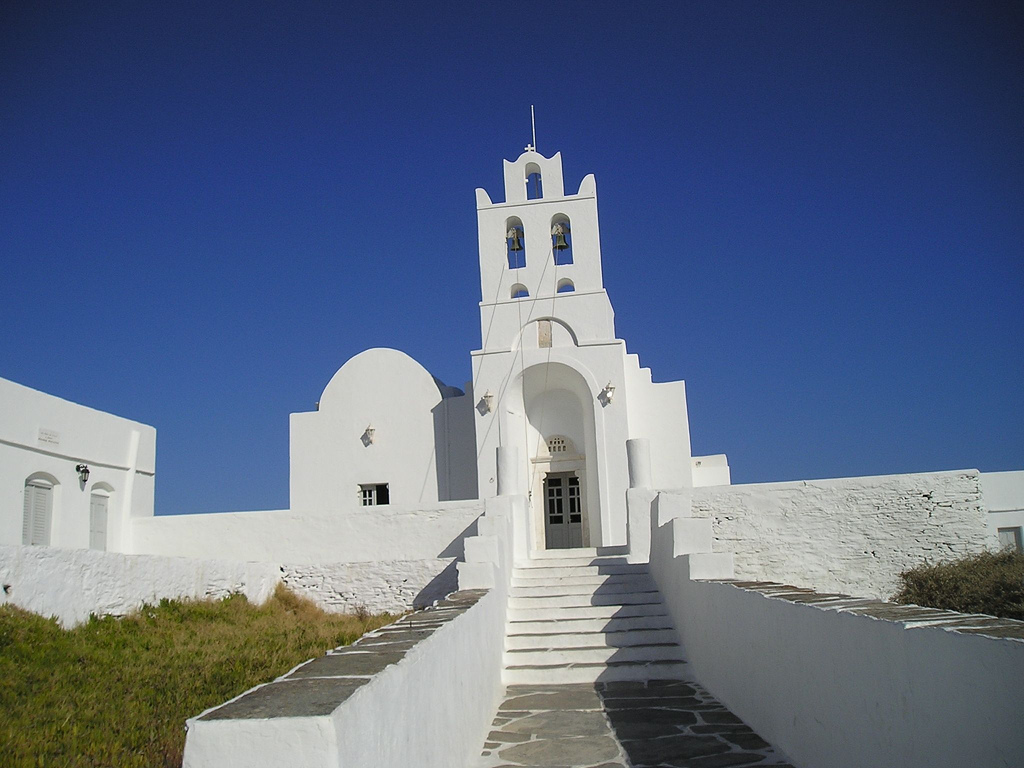
Church of Chrysopigí monastery

Sifnos was inhabited by human beings from at least 4000 BCE. Archeological evidence indicates the island was within the mainstream of Late Neolithic and Early Bronze Age Cycladic civilization. The island was very wealthy in ancient times, thanks to its gold, silver, and lead, which were being mined there as early as the 3rd millennium BCE. Proof of this is the treasury which the Siphnians built at Delphi in the 6th century BCE to house their offerings. According to Pausanias, these mines were obliterated by floods in ancient times, a disaster which some attributed to the people of the island suspending their tribute out of greed. Modern scholars suggest that some of the mines flooded because they had eventually been dug to a depth below sea level, while the majority of them, situated far from the sea, were probably exhausted. Remains of ancient mines, some dating back to prehistoric times, are still to be seen on the island, most notably at Ay. Sostis, and remains of ancient fortifications, dating from the third millennium to the sixth century BCE, have been found at Ay. Andreas, Ay. Nikitas, and Kastro. Another indication of Sifnos's wealth is the fact that it was one of the first places in Greece to mint coins, beginning around 600 BCE, although the number minted does not seem to have been great, and the island of Aegina, which used Siphnian silver, seems to have developed a much greater export capacity in this form of the metal.

During the extensive Greek migrations which occurred beginning perhaps as early as the 12th century BCE, Sifnos was mostly populated by Ionian Greeks from Athens. The island appears only rarely in the subsequent ancient history of Greece. In the sixth century BCE it was invaded by pirates from Samos. In the fifth century BCE, Sifnos was an official member of the Greek defensive alliance formed to fight the Persian Wars. In the next century the island was briefly taken over by the Persians but liberated by a fleet sent by Alexander the Great. The verb "to play the Siphnian" appears in a fragment of Aristophanes, and is explained in the Suda alongside "to Lesbianize" as a reference to transgression.

Little is known of Sifnos during the Roman and Byzantine eras, though three Roman sarcophagi remaining in the streets of Kastro and a collection of 80 Byzantine coins in the museum there testify to substantial continued population during those times. In the early 14th century Sifnos came under the power of the Italian or Spanish Hospitaller Januli I da Corogna, who proclaimed the island independent from the Sanudo dynasty which then ruled most of the Cyclades area. The Corognas ruled Sifnos for over a hundred years; around 1440 as a result of a dynastic marriage power over the island passed to a Bolognese family, the Gozzadini, who ruled until 1617, the last of these rulers being Nikolas. Though both these dynasties became thoroughly Hellenized, they retained their Roman Catholic form of religion, and during the 1800s the Sifniotes continued to take pride in their Latin ancestry.

Little is also known of Sifnos during the Ottoman rule from 1617. It seems likely that, as in most of the Cyclades, Ottoman rule on Sifnos was fairly loose, consisting mainly of the collection of taxes, with the islanders largely administering their own affairs. By the early 17th century Sifnos was a significant commercial center, and from 1821 the island played an important role in the Greek War of Independence.

Notable figures from Sifnos in modern times include the educator and revolutionary leader Nikolaos Chrysogelos (1780–1858), who served as Greece's Minister of Education, and the chef Nikolaos Tselementes (1878–1958), who wrote a classic cookery book still used in Greece today.

The island's rich clay veins, sunny weather and temperature have made Sifnos a capital of pottery in the Aegean, with unique jars and pots that are a "trademark" of the island. They are typical of the Sifnian everyday life, such as ashtrays, cooking and food vessels, "masteles", "foufoudes" (kind of chimneys) etc. Locally, 'Sifnios' was a variant word for potter. The oldest potteries were found in central regions such as Artemon and Ano Petali to avoid pirate attacks.

== Beaches ==
The most famous ones are:

- Cherónnisos (Χερόννησος)
- Pouláti (Πουλάτη)
- Fáros (Φάρος)
- Platís Gialós (Πλατύς Γιαλός)
- Vathí (Βαθύ)
- Apokoftó (Αποκοφτό)
- Vroulídia (Βρουλίδια)
- Fykiáda (Φυκιάδα)
- Chrysopigí (Χρυσοπηγή)
- Kamáres (Καμάρες)

== Churches ==
There are 237 churches in the island of Sifnos. It is no coincidence, the large number of festivals held on the island almost every month. Many churches and monasteries of the island are historical sites with great religious and architectural interest. The most important one is the monastery of Panagia Chrysopigi. One of the most "popular" churches of the island, is one of the Seven Martyrs, where many couples choose to get married. Still, Panagia Poulati is renowned both for its beauty and the landscape that surrounds it.

== Religious festivals (Panigiria) ==
Several religious festivals are held during the summer.

- In July
  - St. Marina in Flabouro in the evening of the 17th
  - Prophet Helias (2 events both in the evening of the 19th: on the top of the tallest mountain-also known as Prophet Helias the tall and in Troullaki respectively)
- In August
  - Holy Virgin (Panagia) on the 15th. There are many events on the following days.
    - Panagia tou Nigiou, in the evening of the 16th
    - Panagia Platanissa, in the evening of the 16th
    - Panagia to Toso Nero, in the evening of the 17th
  - St.Symeon in the evening of the 31st

== Cuisine ==
Local dishes:

- Mastelo: goat or lamb marinated in red wine and dill, cooked in special clay pot – called mastelo – in a wood fired oven. Traditionally served on Holy Saturday evening, during Orthodox Easter.
- Revithada: chickpea soup cooked overnight in a wood-fired oven, in clay cooking pots called skepastaria. Traditionally served after Sunday church services.
- Manoura Sifnou: local cheese

== Historical population ==
| Year | Population |
|---|---|
| 1951 | 2,773 |
| 1981 | 2,856 |
| 2001 | 2,574 |
| 2011 | 2,625 |
| 2021 | 2,777 |

== Subdivisions ==
The municipality Sifnos is subdivided into the following districts and villages:

- Apollonia (Apollonia, Vathy, Kamares, Kastro, Kato Petali, Platys Gialos, Faros, Chrysopigi)
- Artemonas (Artemonas, Agia Marina, Troulaki, Cherronisos)

== People ==
- Patriarch Gregory VII of Constantinople (1850–1924)
- Patriarch Hierotheus II of Alexandria (?-1858)
- Aristomenis Provelengios (1850–1936), poet and politician
- Nikolaos Tselementes (1878–1958), chef
- Nikos Chrysogelos (born 1959), politician

== Gallery ==
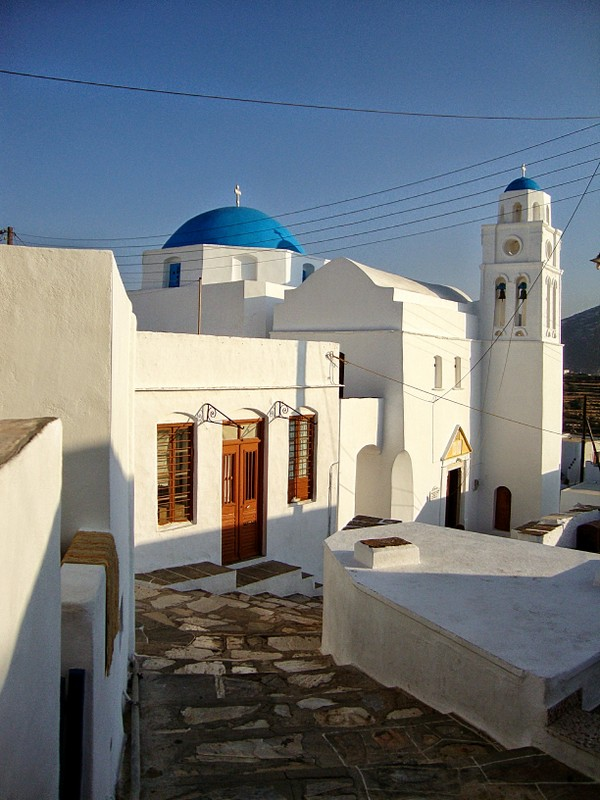
Artemonas, Madonna of Bali

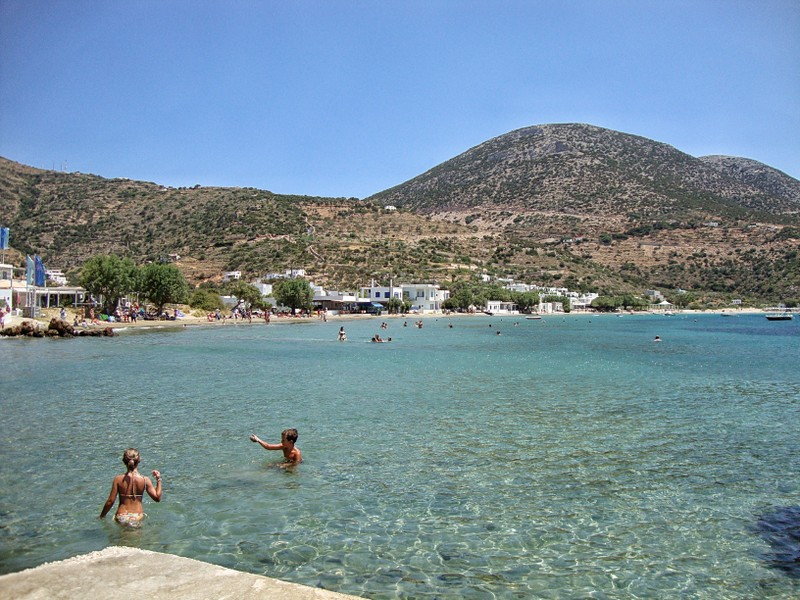
View of Vathi

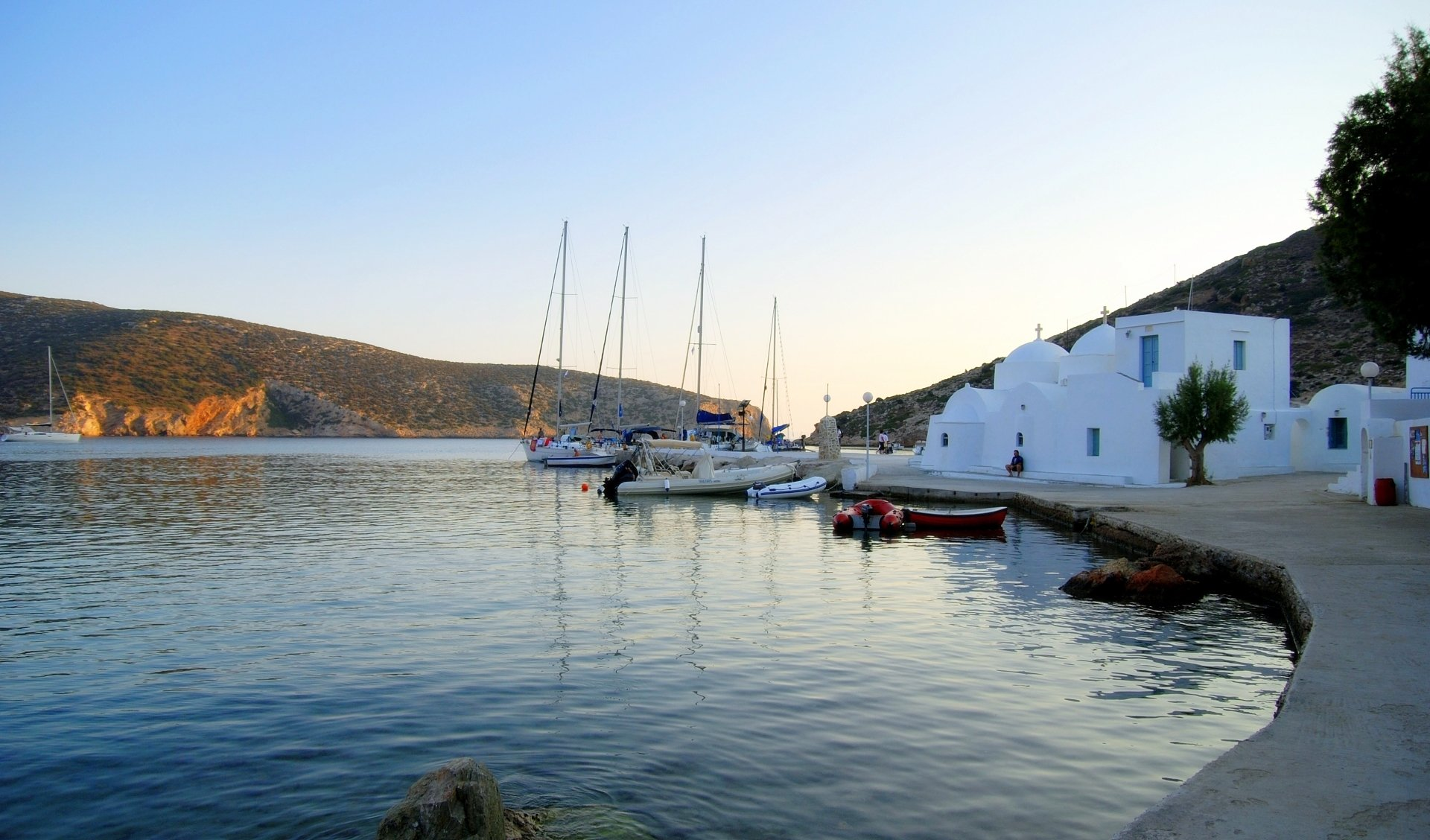
The small church of Vathi

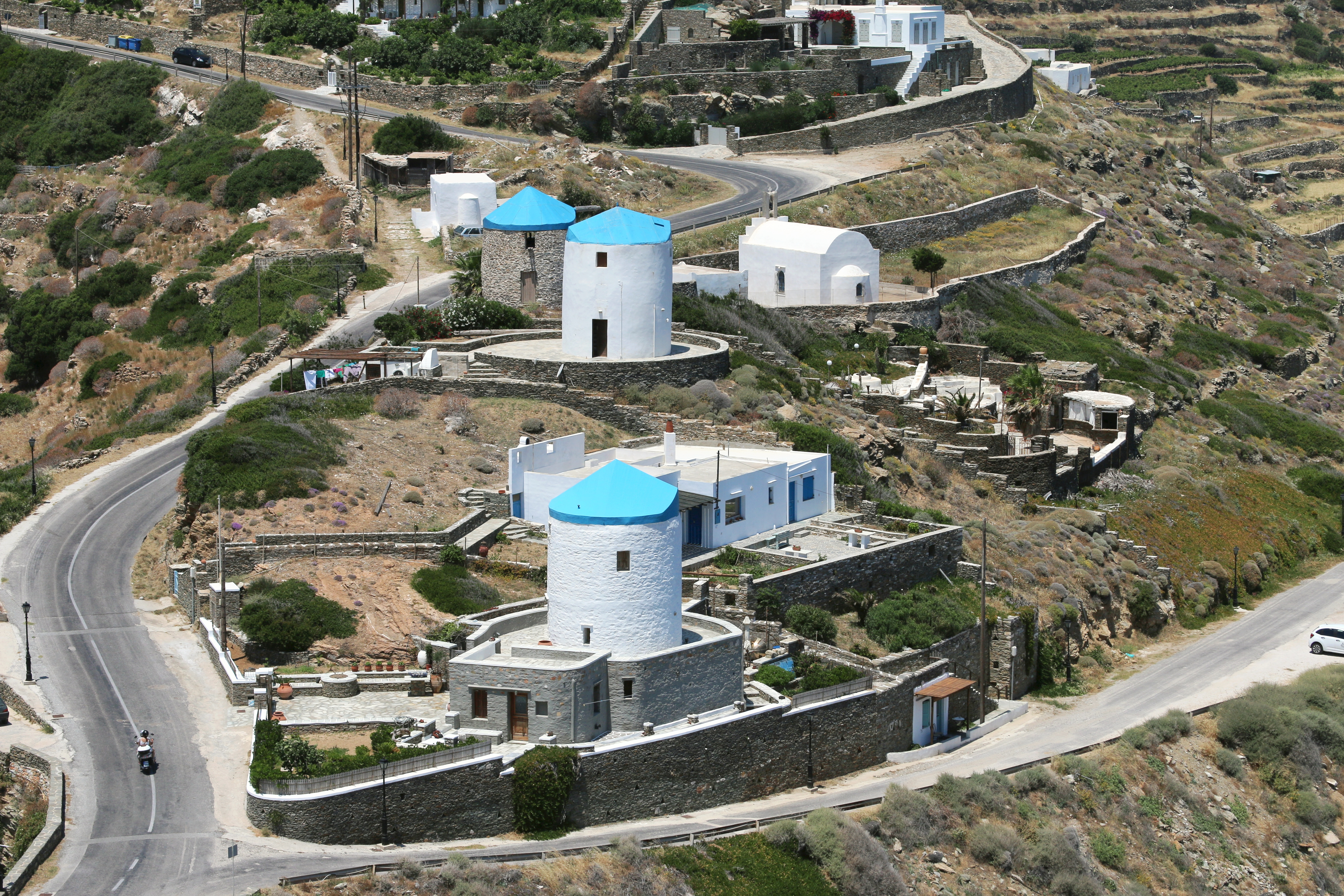
Windmills in Kastro

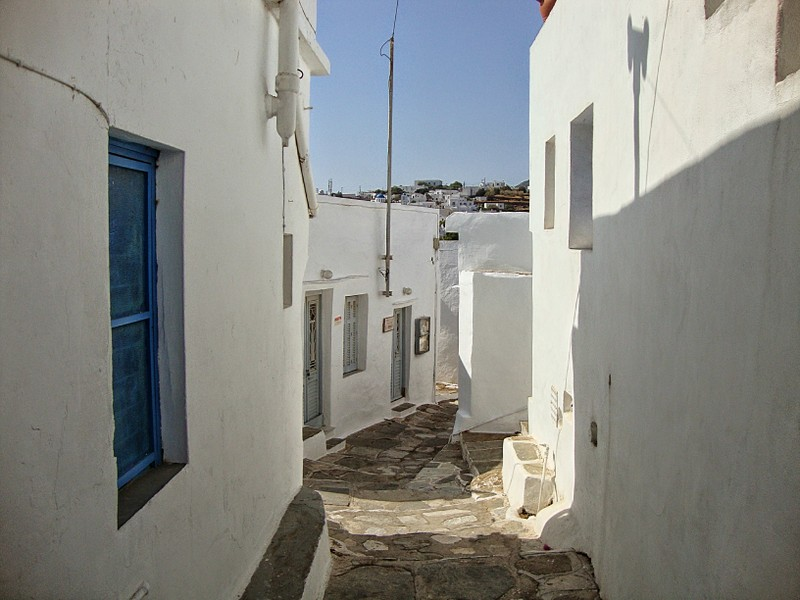
Apollonia, steps to the centre

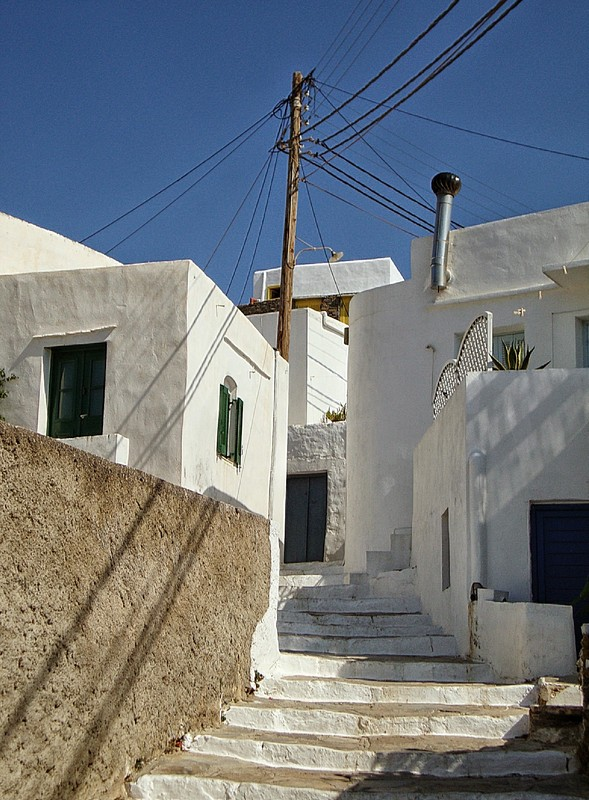
Apollonia, steps to Ano Petali

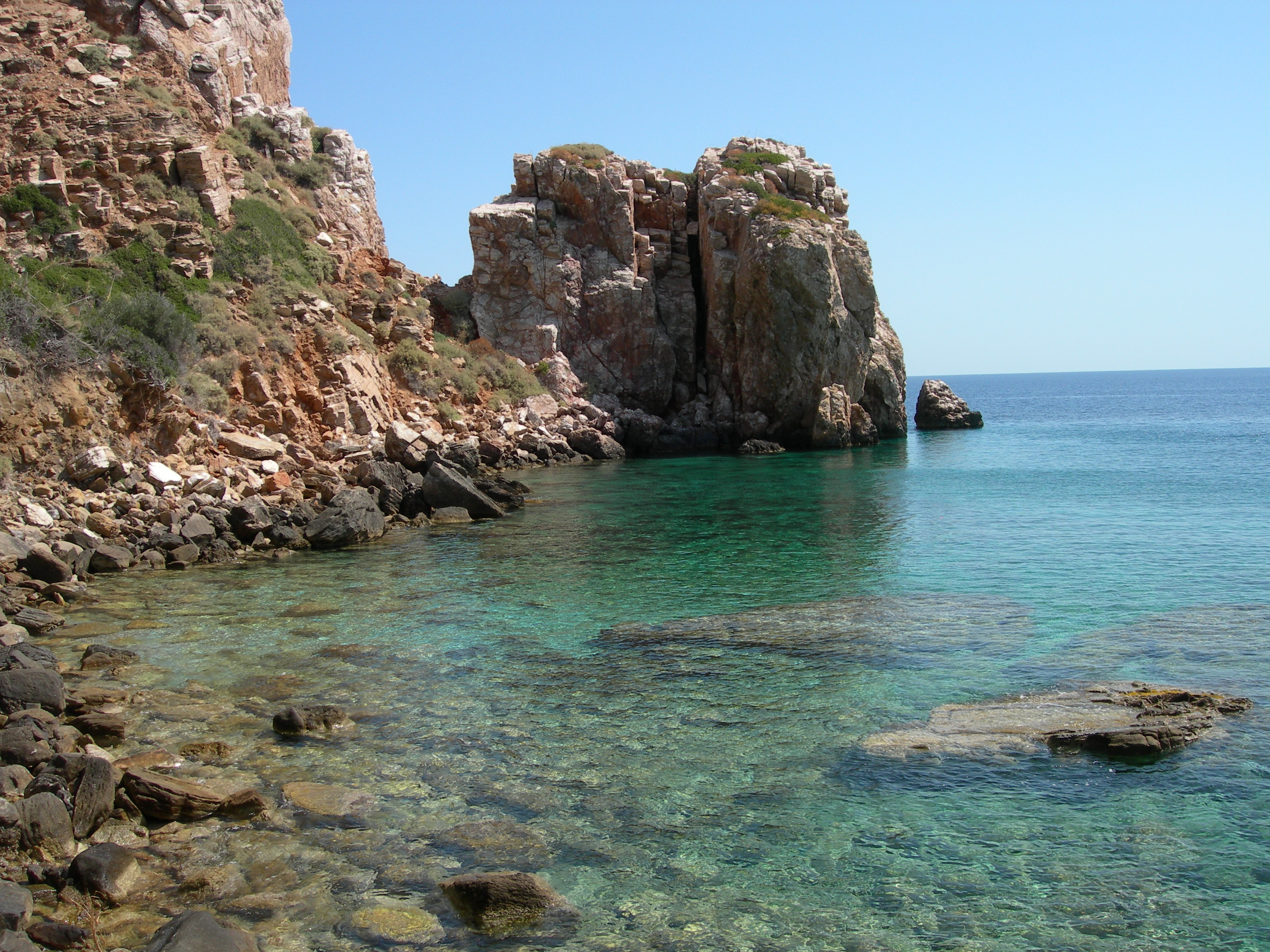
Poulati beach

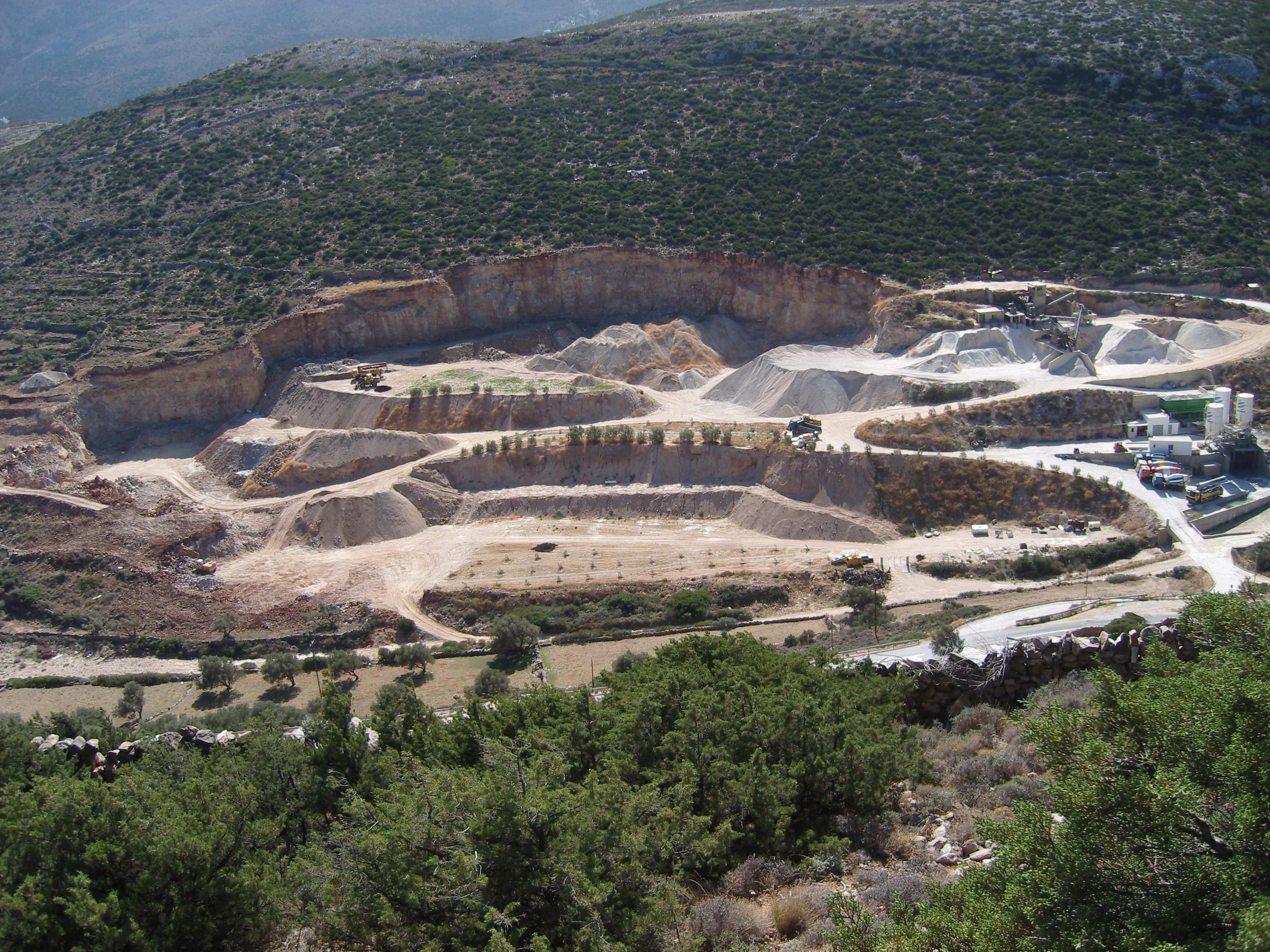
Quarry on Sifnos

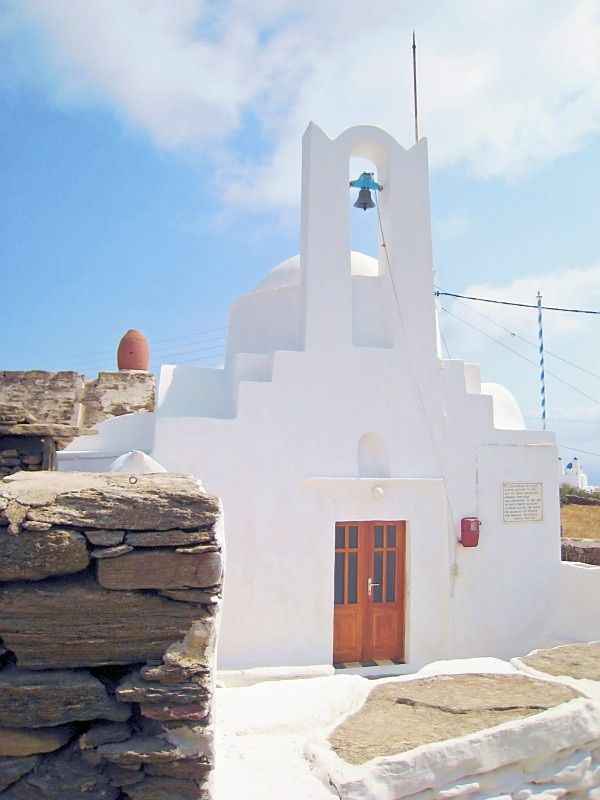
A small church

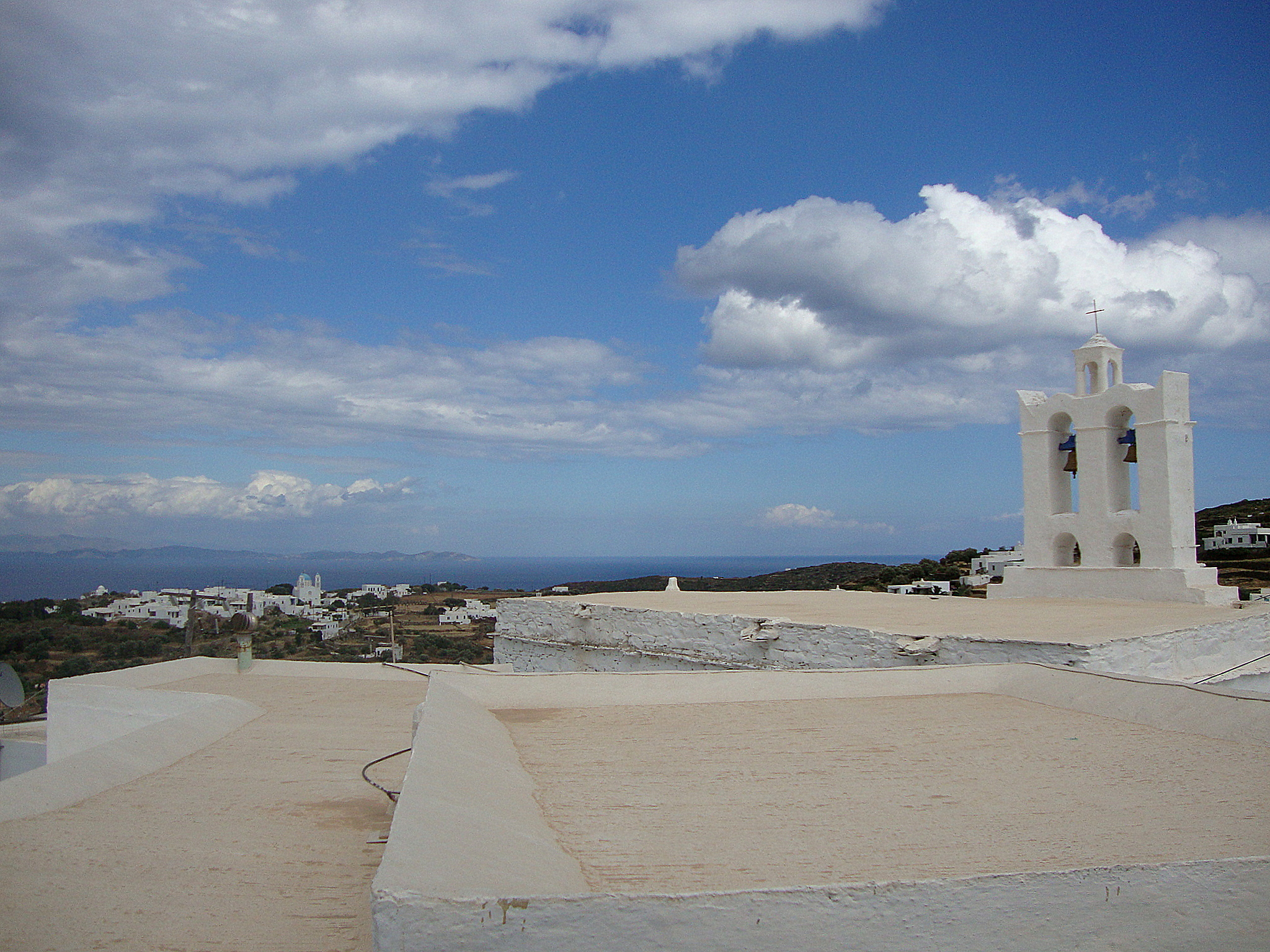
Apollonia, view to Kato Petali

== See also ==
- Communities of the Cyclades
