= Archaeological Museum of Sifnos =

Museum in Kastro, Sifnos, Greece

Coordinates: 36.74384°N 24.42361°E

The Archaeological Museum of Sifnos is a museum, in the village of Kastro on Sifnos (the capital of the island since the Archaic period until 1836), in Greece. Its collections include exhibits dating from the early Bronze Age to the late Byzantine period. There are mostly local finds.

The building of the museum belongs to the medieval nucleus of the Kastro. It was restored by the Greek Ministry of Culture and opened to the public in 1986.

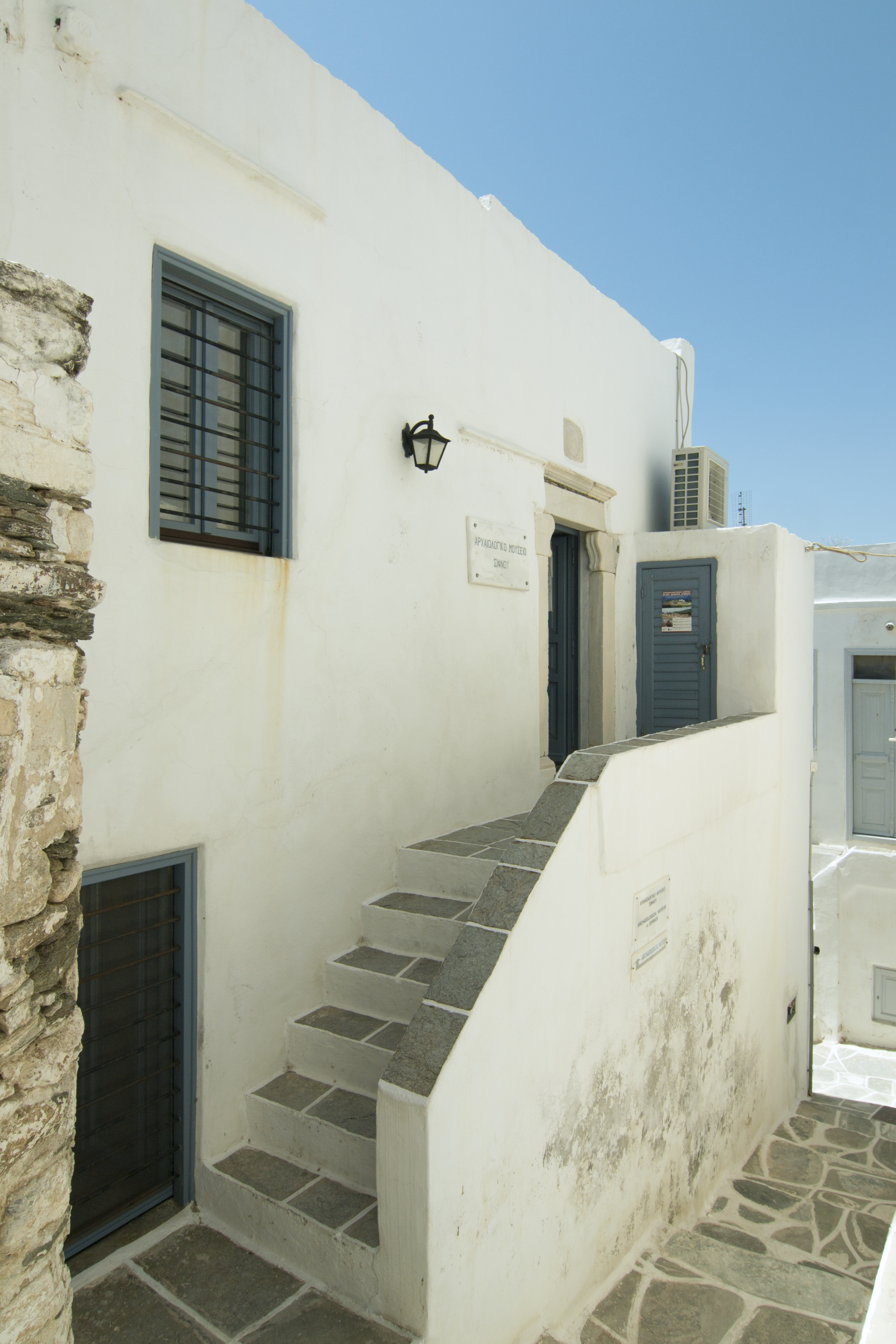
Historical building of the Museum

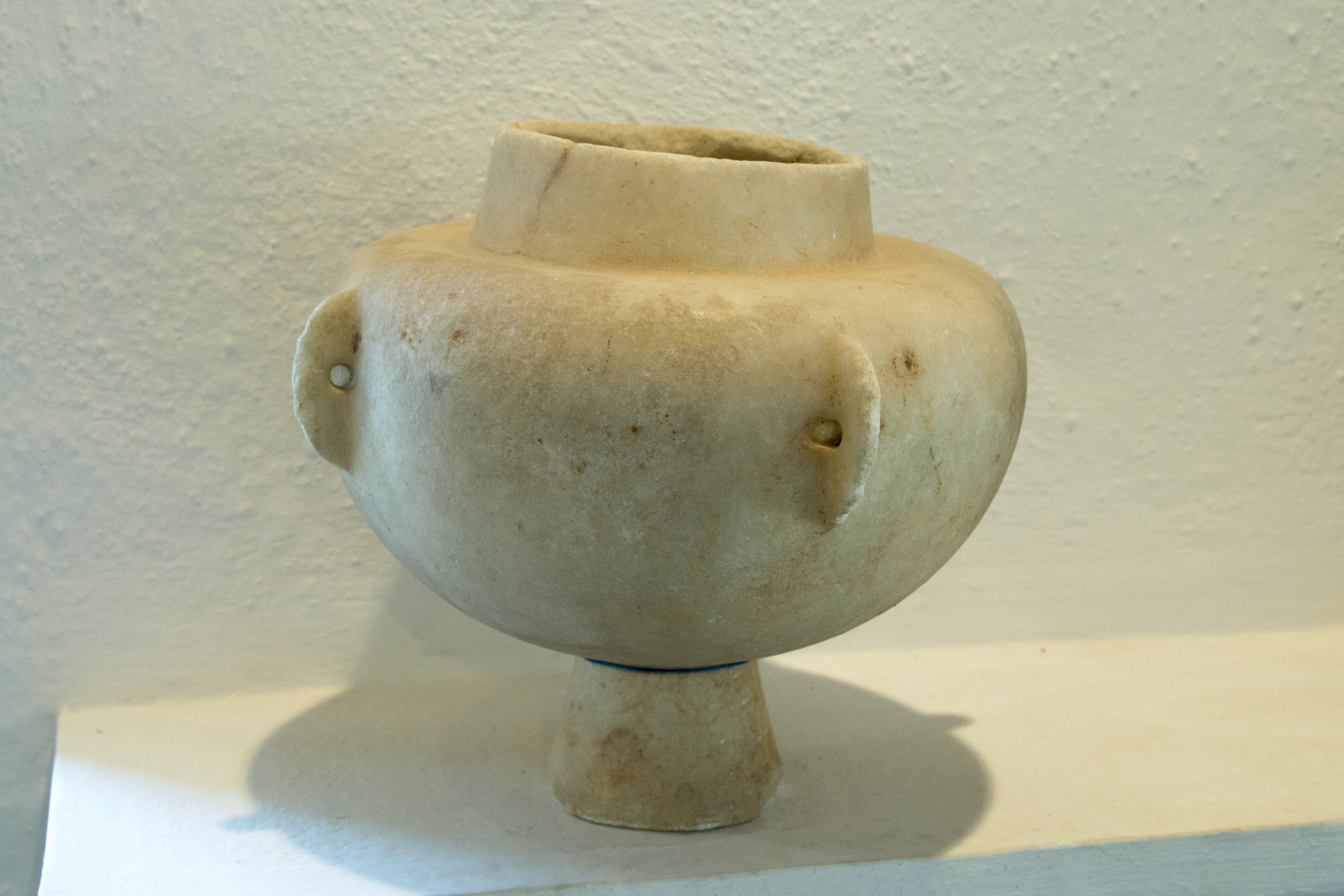
Early Cycladic kandila (chandelier), marble, ca 3000 BC

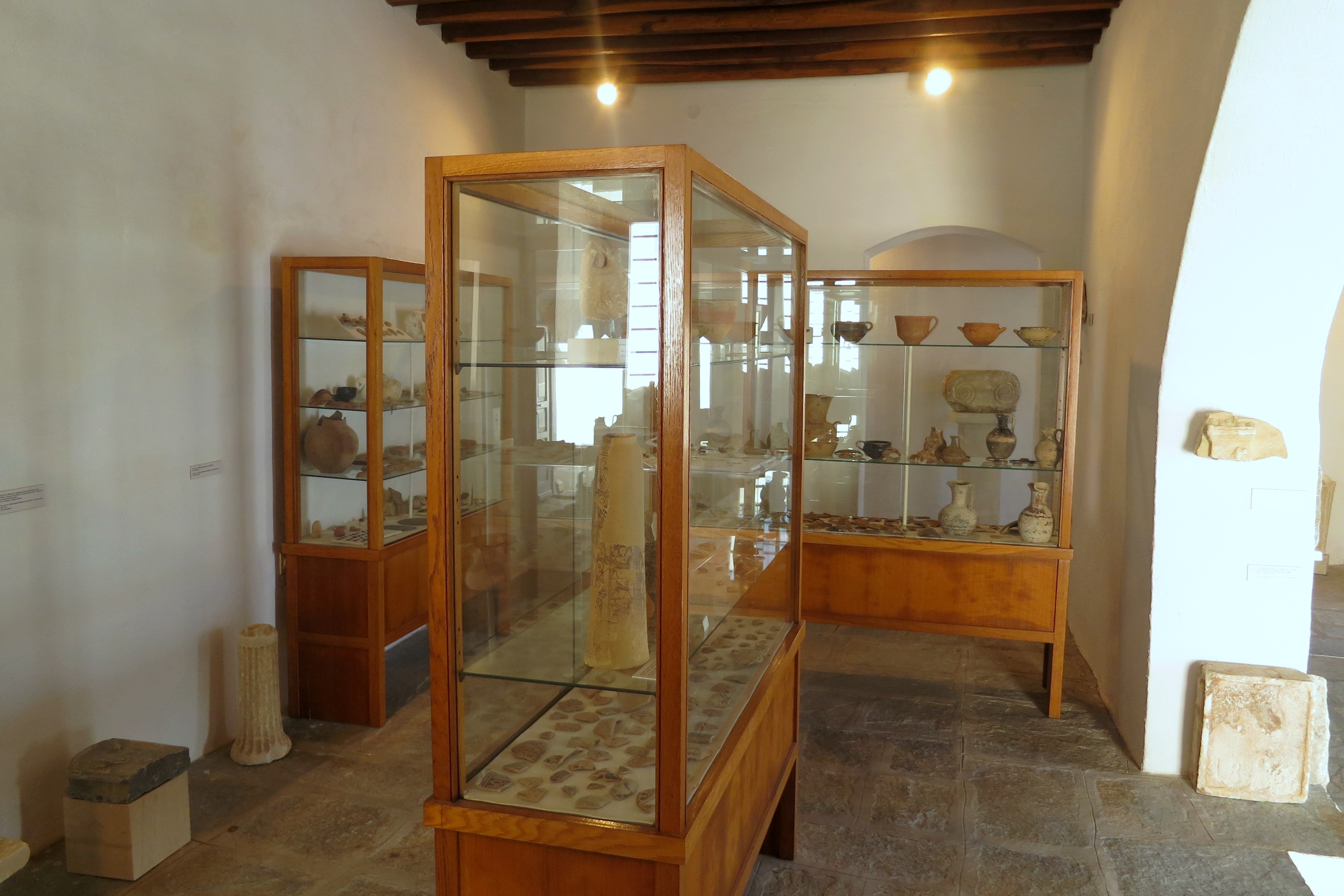
Cases with Greek geometric and archaic pottery

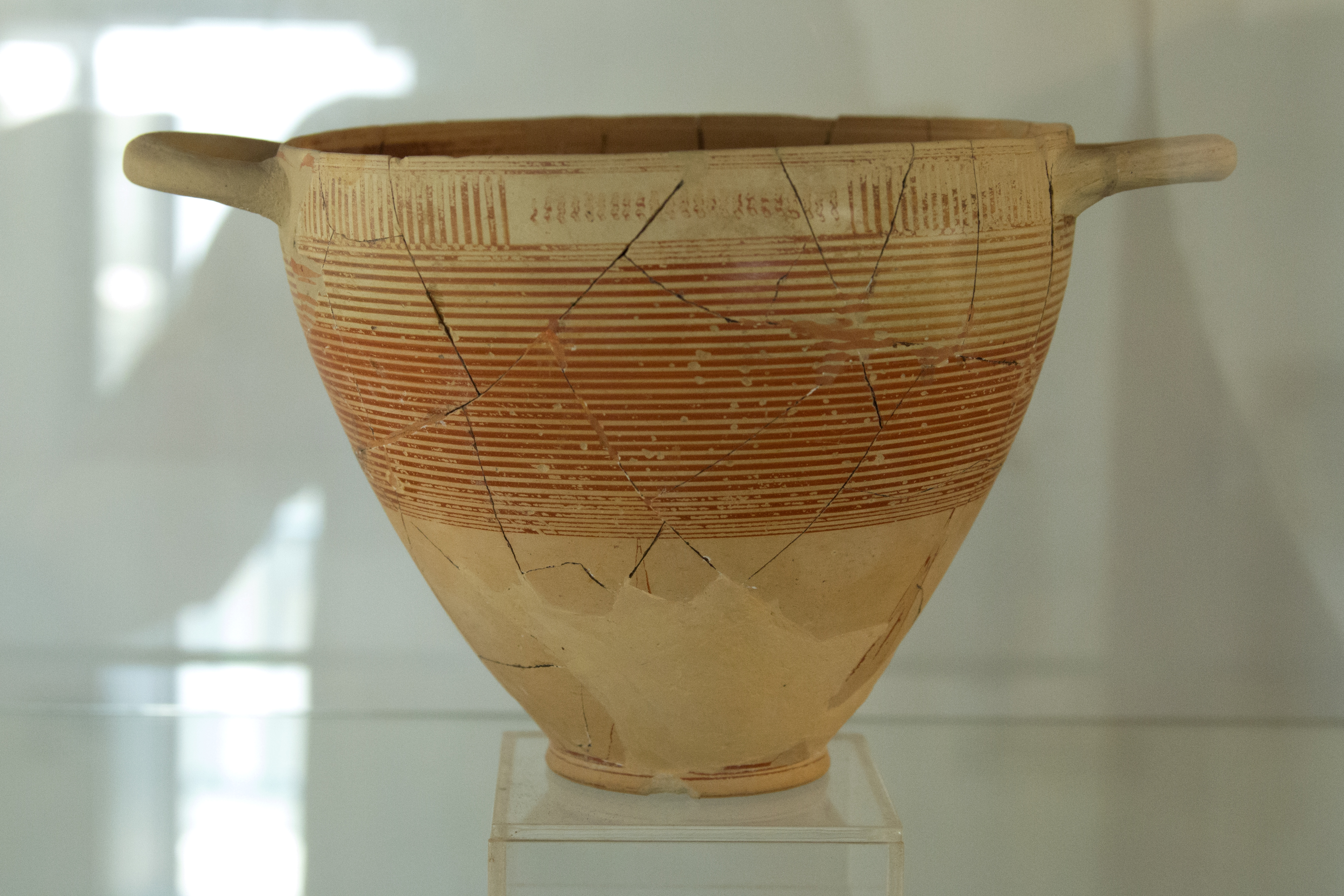
Protocorinthian cotyle, early 7th century BC

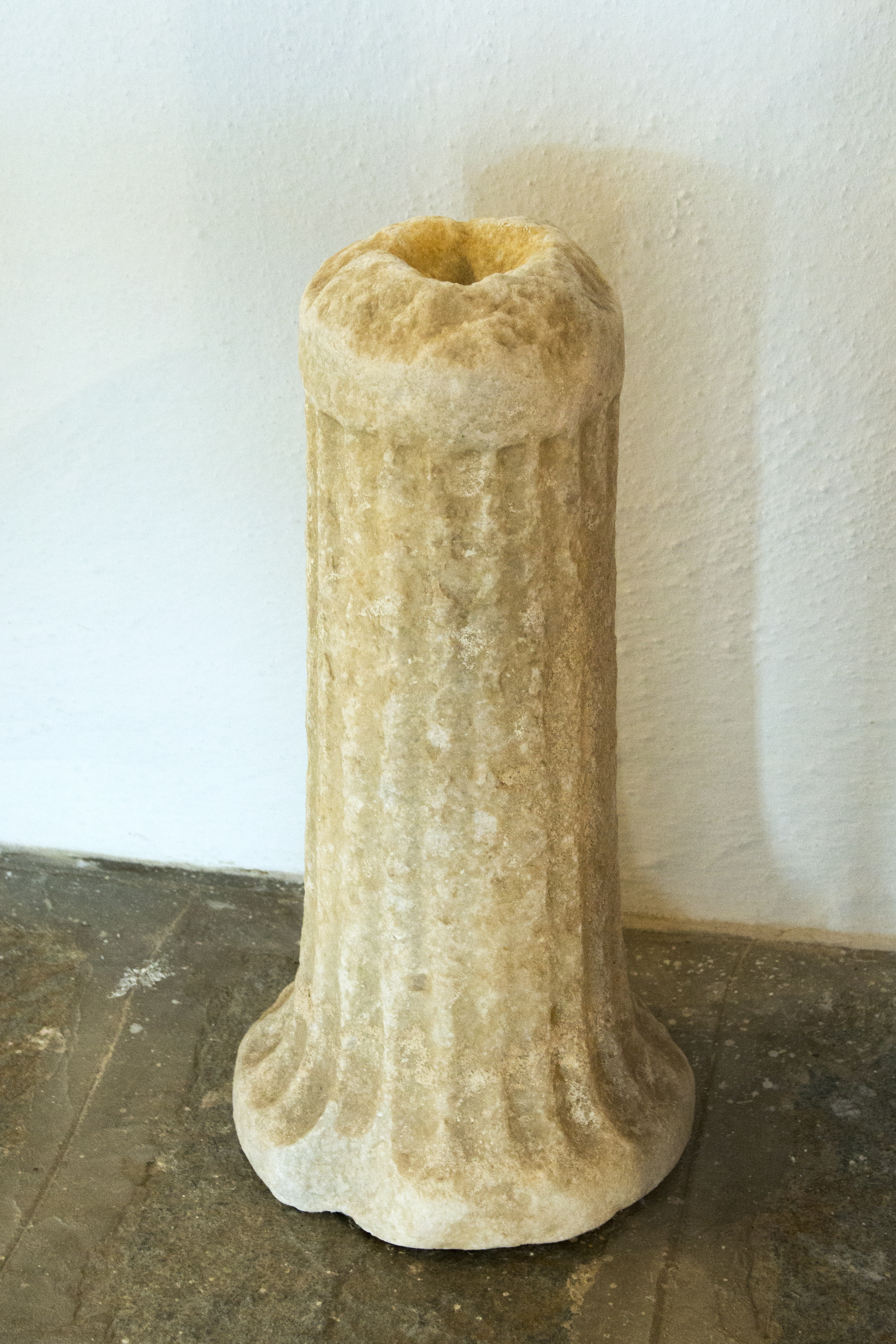
Base of marble perirhanterion (holy water bowl) from the Kastro of Sifnos

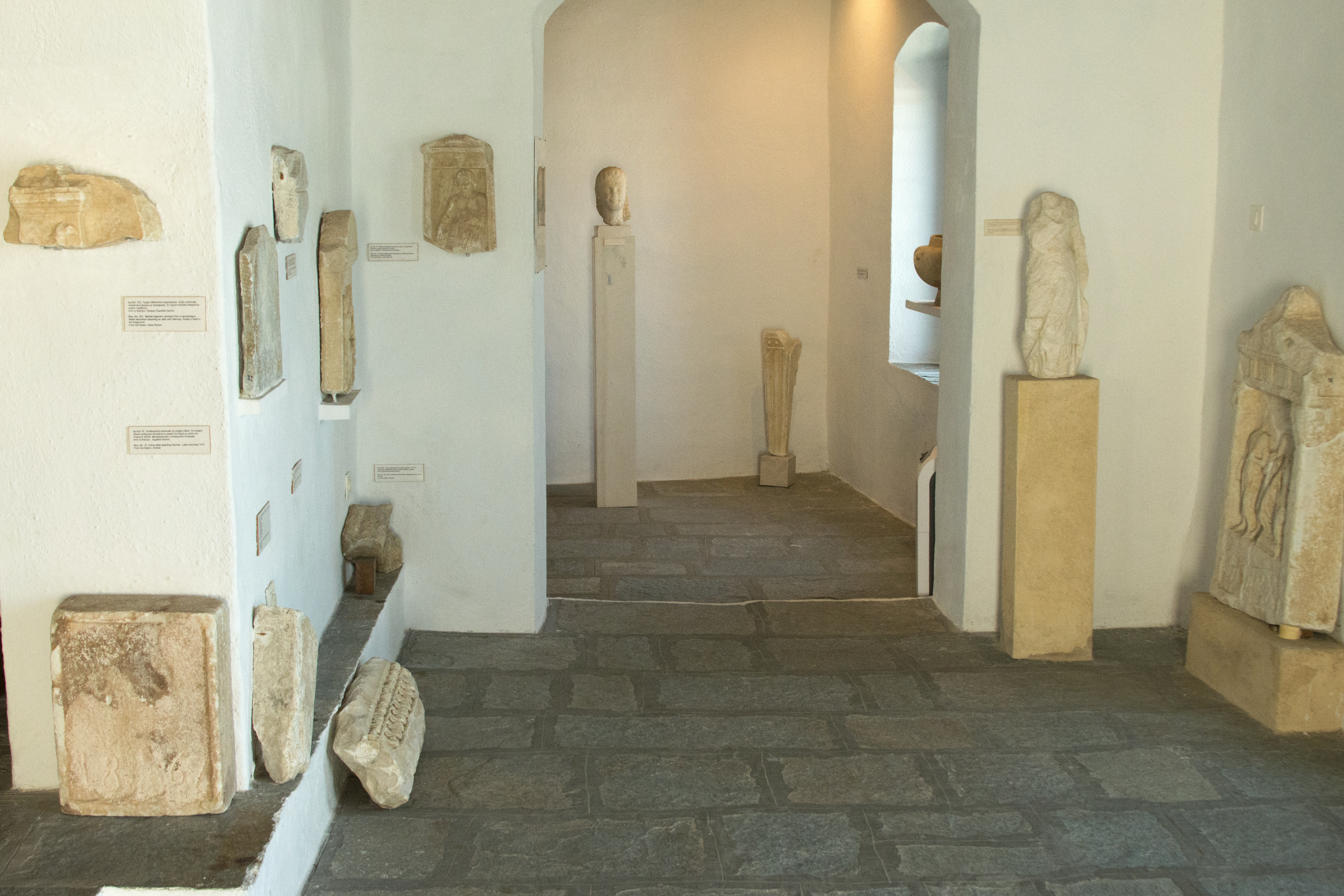
Rooms with ancient sculptures

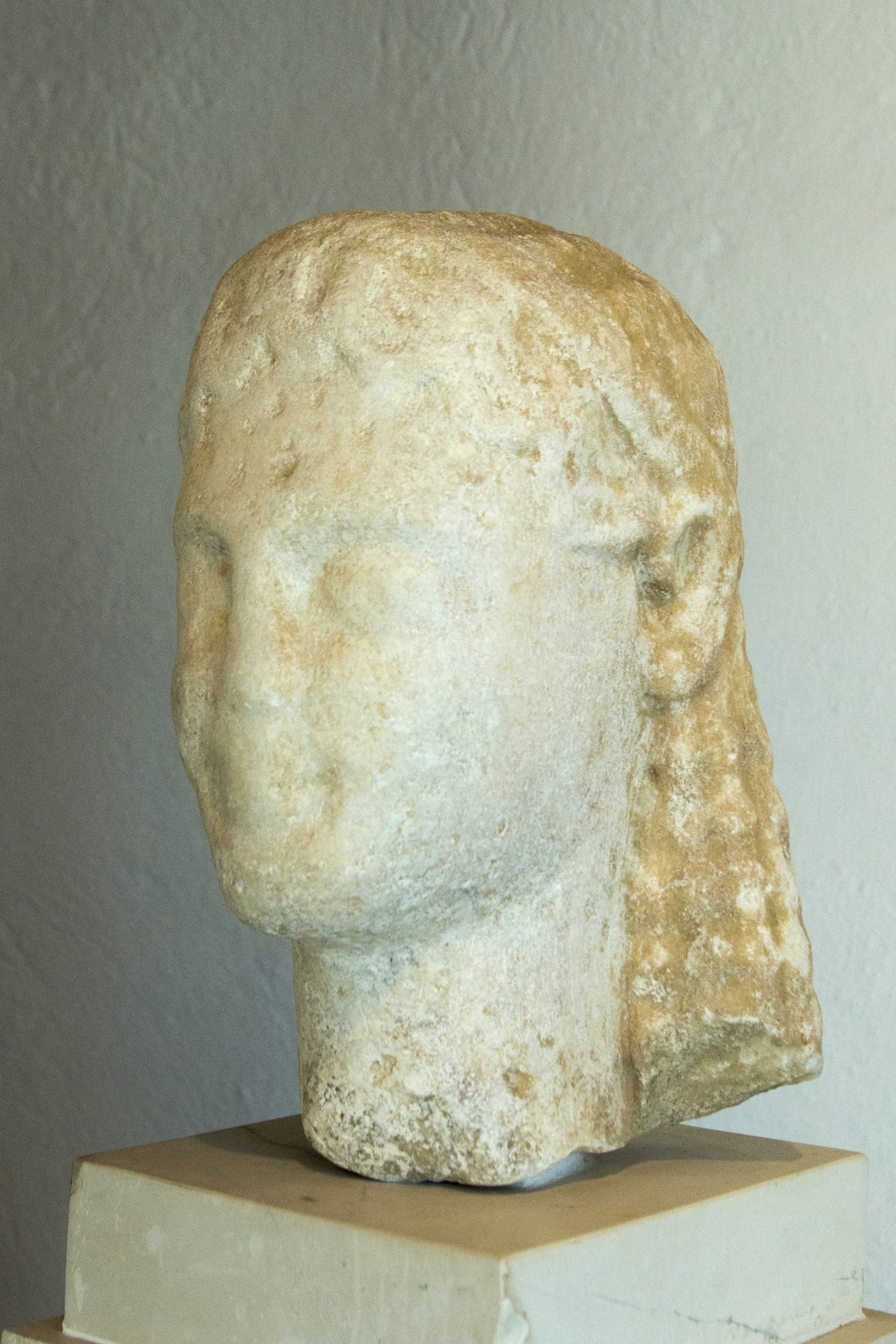
Eroded head of a Kouros, marble, 550 BC

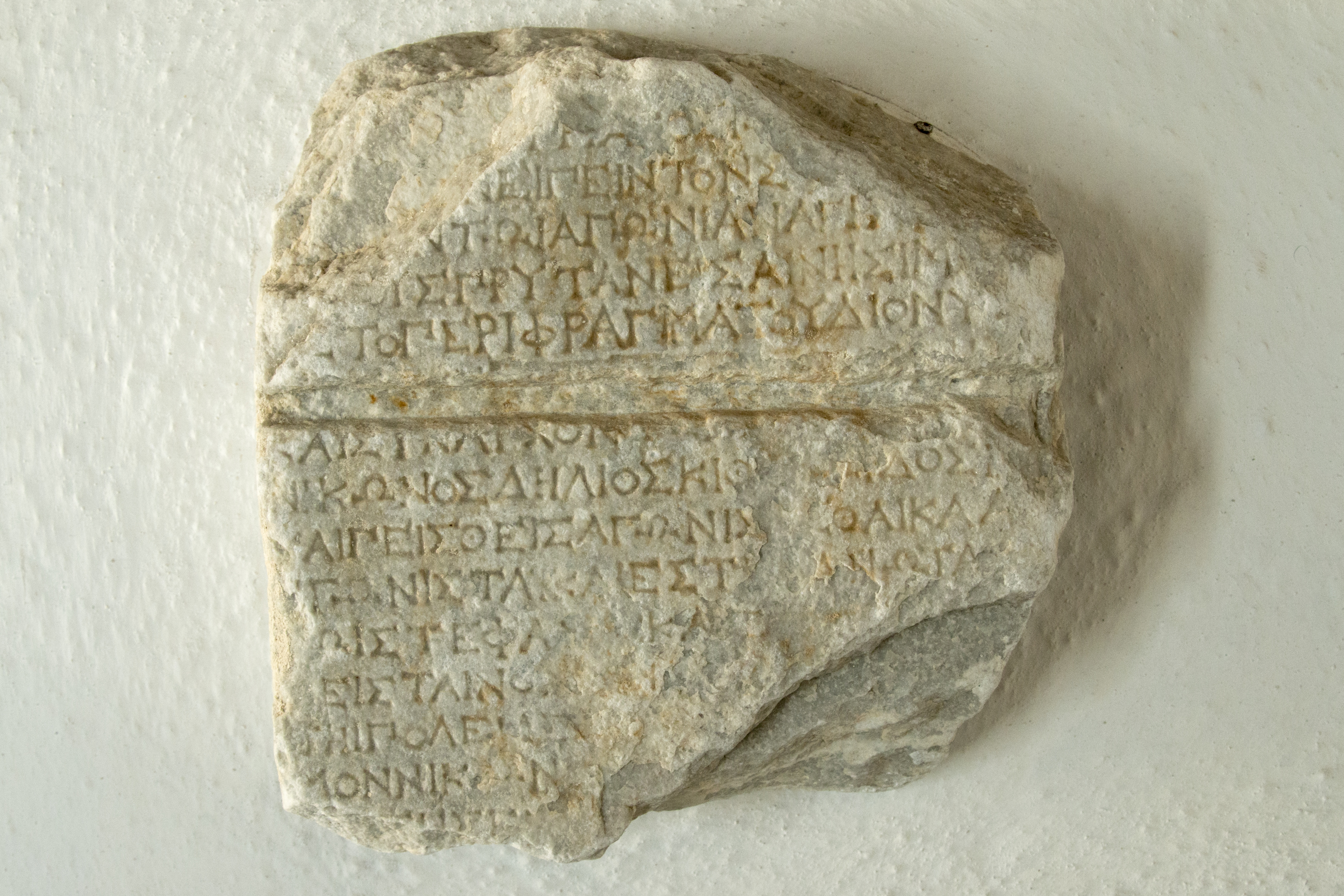
Part of marble stele, inscribed with decree honouring a Delian lyre player, Hellenistic period

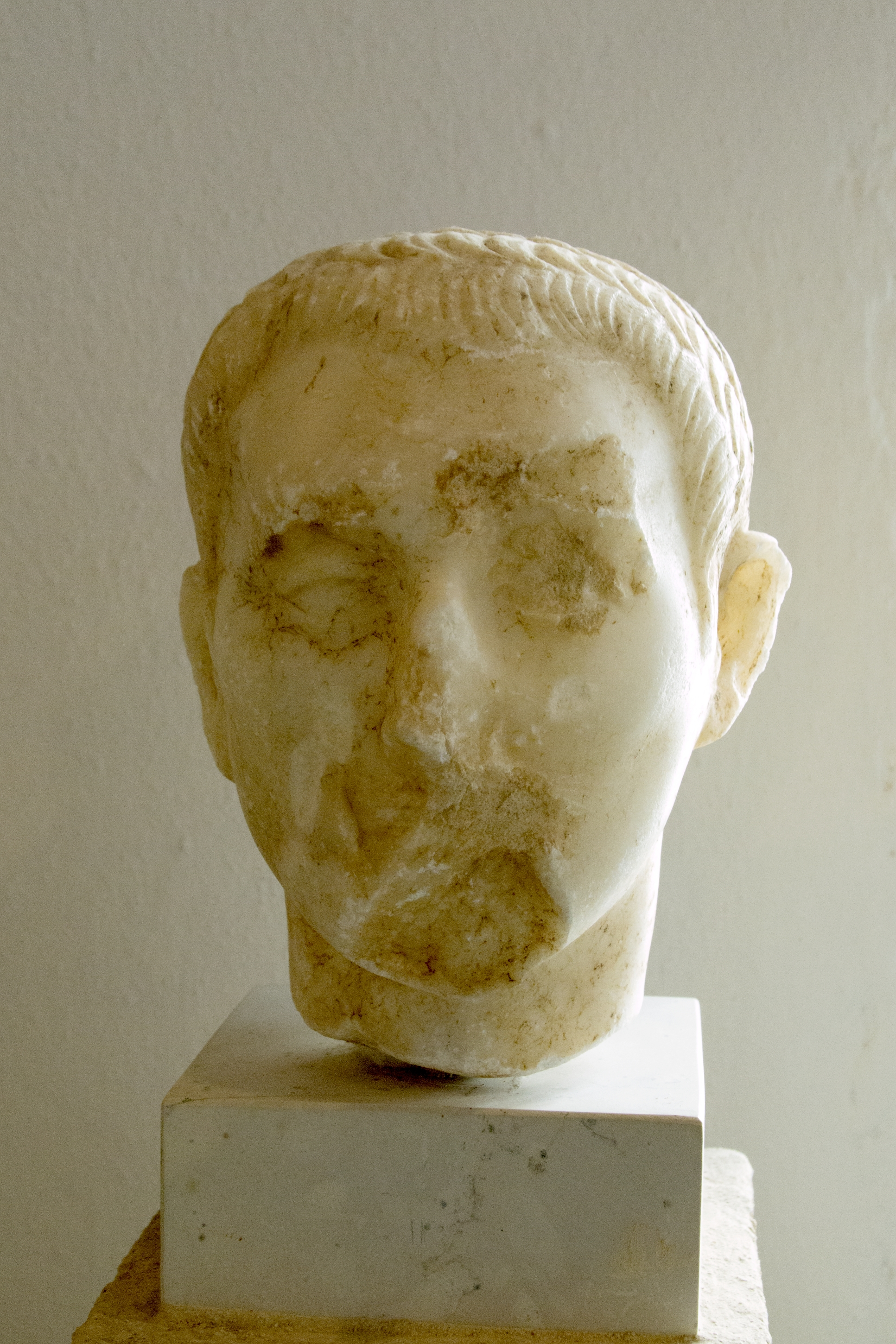
Roman portrait of a man, marble

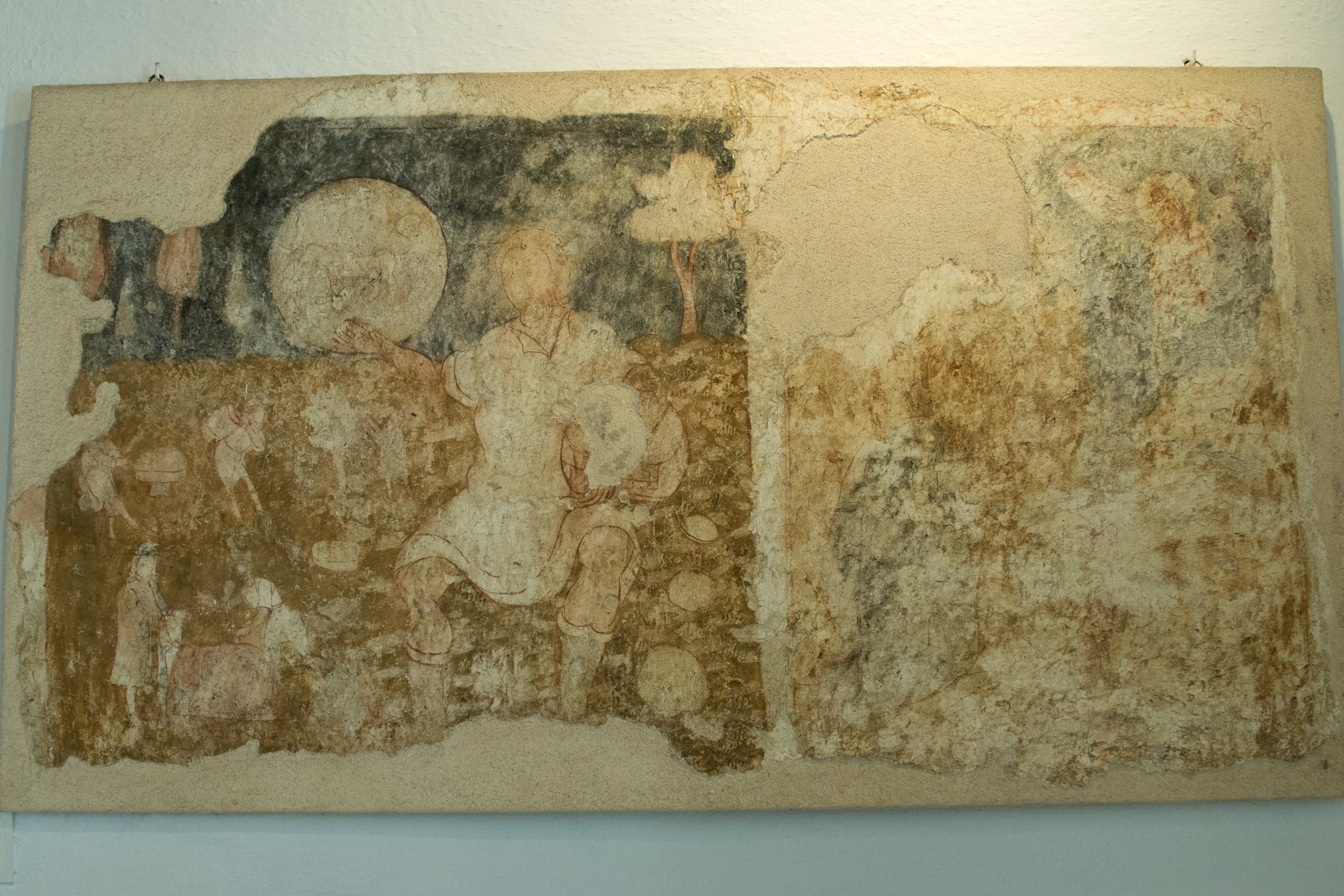
Fresco from a church at Kastro of Sifnos, ca 1700 AD
