= Apollonia (Sifnos) =

Village in Sifnos, Greece

Apollonia Απολλωνία
- Community
- Location within Greece
- Coordinates: 36°58′25″N 24°43′25″E
- Country: Greece
- Administrative region: South Aegean
- Regional unit: Milos
- Municipality: Sifnos
- Municipal unit: Sifnos
- Elevation: 200 m (660 ft)

Population (2021)
  - Community: 1,898
- Time zone: UTC+2 (EET)
  - Summer (DST): UTC+3 (EEST)
- Area code: +30-22840

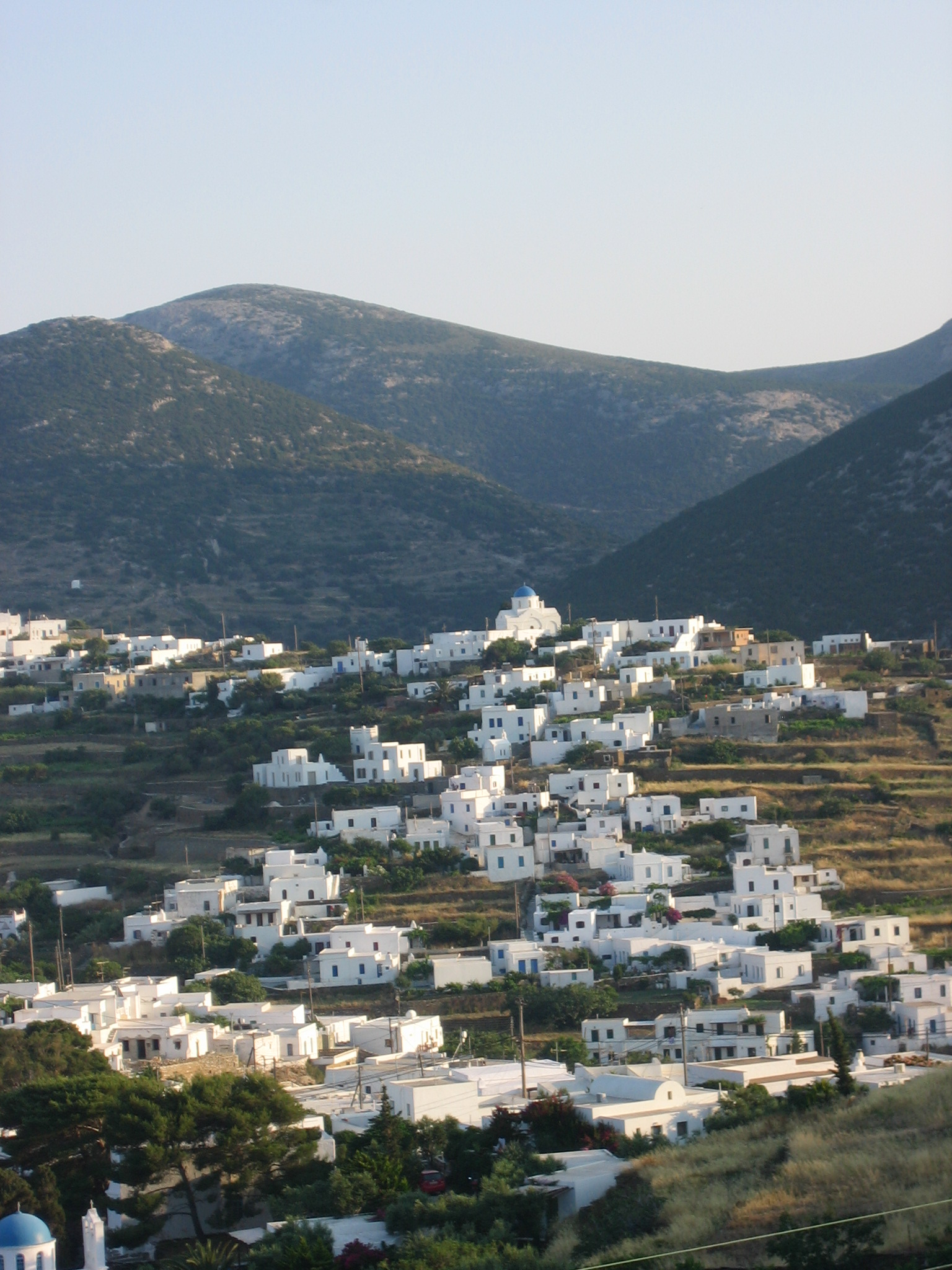
Town of Apollonia, Sifnos

Apollonia (also called Stavri) is a village in Sifnos, Cyclades, Greece. It is the capital (chora) and largest village of the island with 869 inhabitants as of the 2011 Greek Census. It is the head of the homonymous community, which includes the villages Vathy, Kamares, Kastro, Platys Gialos, Kato Petali, Faros and Chrysopigi and has a total population of 1,898 residents (2021). It is named after the god Apollo of the Greek mythology.

== General information ==
Apollonia is located on top of three hills in the inner part of Sifnos. Traditional cycladic architecture is dominant in the village. People born in Apollonia include satyric poet and journalist Kleanthis Triantafyllopoulos and Gregory VII of Constantinople. In the central square of the village there is a folklore museum. The village also has plenty of churches, something common in the whole island.
