= Kastro (Sifnos) =

Kastro Κάστρο
- Settlement
- Location within Greece
- Coordinates: 36°58′28″N 24°44′43″E
- Country: Greece
- Administrative region: South Aegean
- Regional unit: Milos
- Municipality: Sifnos
- Community: Apollonia
- Elevation: 80 m (260 ft)

Population (2021)
  - Total: 124
- Time zone: UTC+2 (EET)
  - Summer (DST): UTC+3 (EEST)

Kastro (Greek: Κάστρο) is a settlement in the cycladic island of Sifnos in Greece. According to the 2021 Greek census it had 124 inhabitants. Kastro is built on top of a steep hill near the eastern coast of the island, at an altitude of 80 meters. Below the hill there is a small bay, which was used as the port of the settlement.

== History ==
Kastro was probably created in the 14th century, and may have been built by the House of Coruña, who captured the island from the Byzantines in 1307. In the ruins of Despotikos, which was the residence of the local lord, there is an inscription from 1365, with the name of Giannoulis da Coruña. The earliest known mention of Kastro is by Cristoforo Buondelmonti in the Isolario of 1420.

Kastro became the main village of the island with estimations of its population in the beginning of the 17th century being at 5000 residents. It remained the principal settlement of the island until 1836, when Apollonia was designated as the capital of the island.

== Geography of the settlement ==
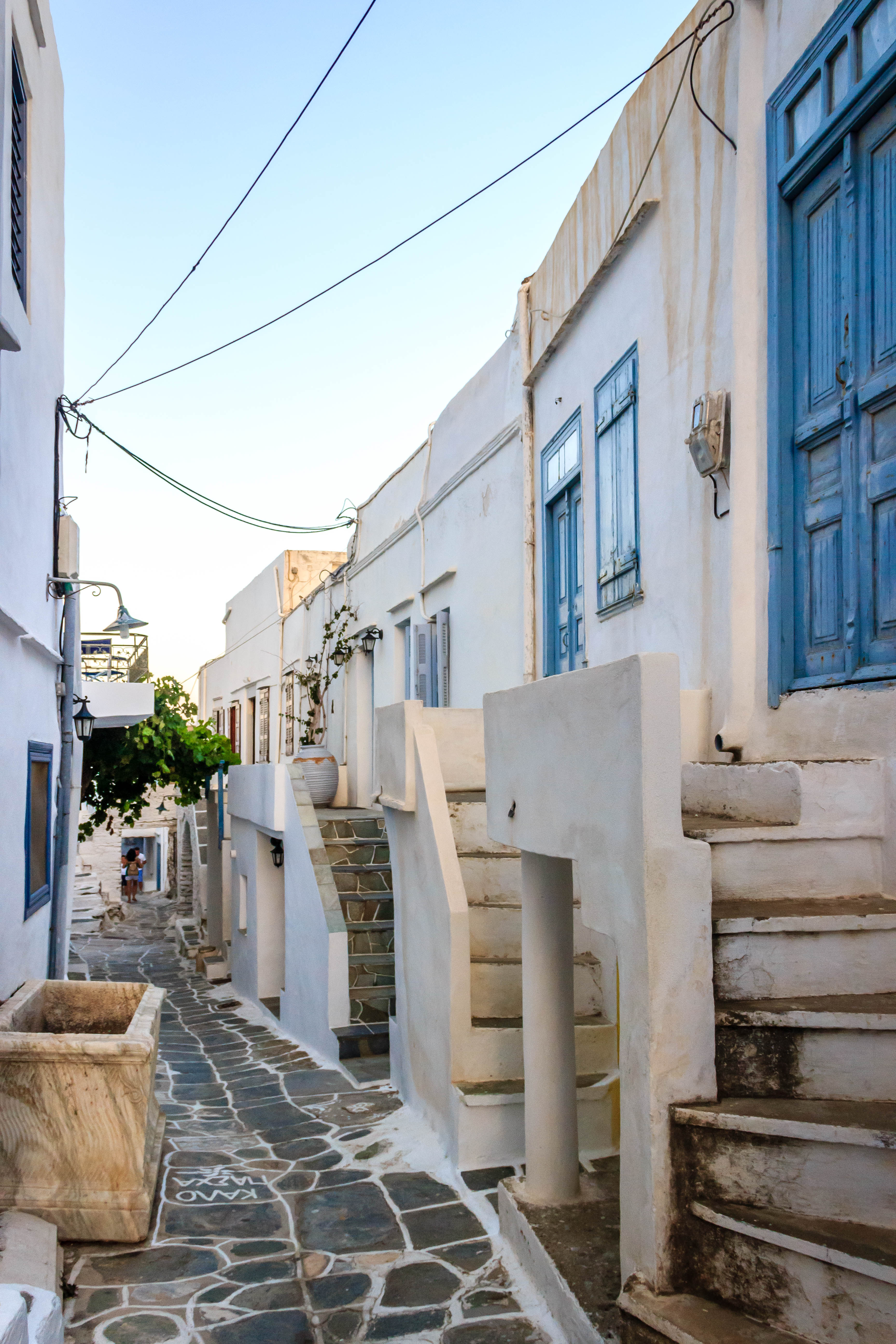
Street in Kastro (attribution of copyrights)

Kastro is built around a hill and the houses and streets form an oval shape following the surface of the hill. Buildings are relatively small, with most of them having an area of around 30 square meters and one or two floors (including ground floor).

== Places of interest ==
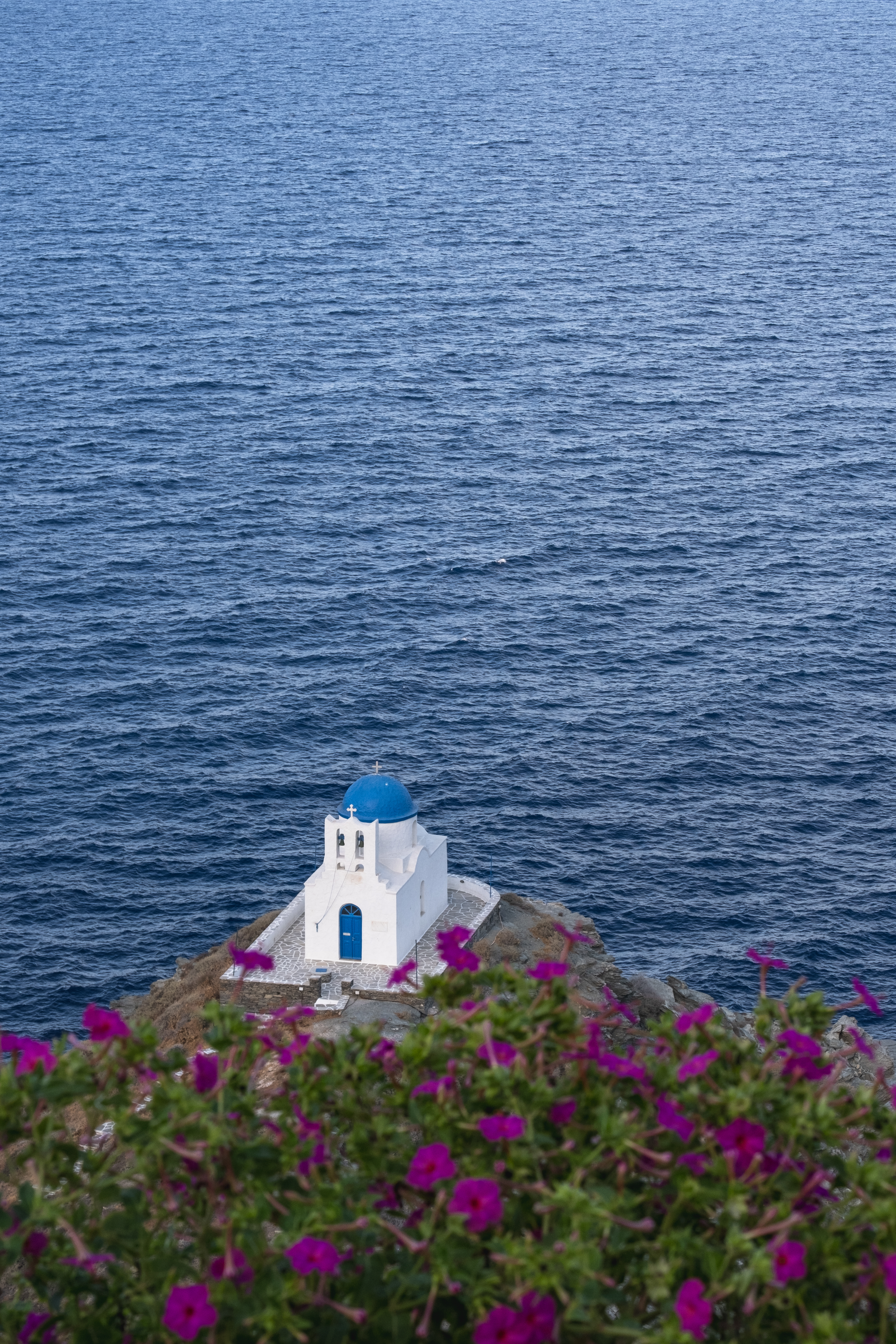
Church of the Seven Martyrs near Kastro

The Archaeological Museum of Sifnos, that started operating in 1986, is situated in Kastro. It hosts collections with sculptures, pottery and coins of Greek and Roman antiquity.

In the settlement of Kastro there are also ancient marbles, columns and sarcophagi.
