= Vathy (Sifnos) =

Vathy Βαθύ
- Settlement
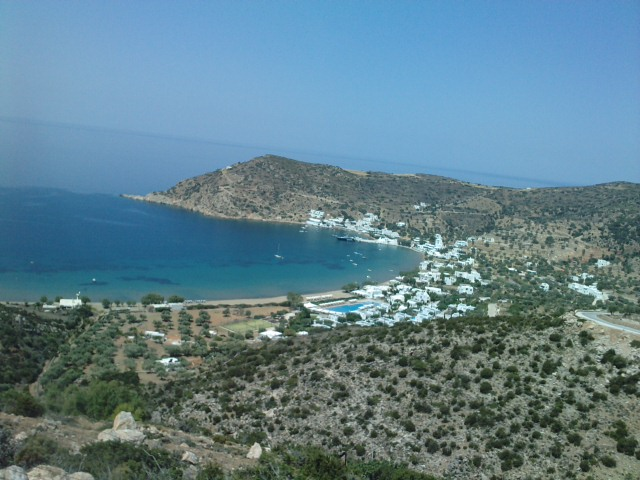

- Location within Greece
- Coordinates: 36°56′N 24°41′E
- Country: Greece
- Administrative region: South Aegean
- Regional unit: Milos
- Municipality: Sifnos
- Community: Apollonia

Population (2021)
  - Total: 75
- Time zone: UTC+2 (EET)
  - Summer (DST): UTC+3 (EEST)

Vathy is a small seaside village in Sifnos, Greece. According to the 2021 Greek census it had a population of 75 permanent residents. It is located on the southwest coast of the island facing the neighboring island of Kimolos.

Vathy belongs to the community of Apollonia of the municipality of Sifnos, which in turn belongs to Milos regional unit of the South Aegean administrative unit.
