= Free enterprise (disambiguation) =

Free enterprise is an economic term related to a free market.

Free Enterprise may also refer to:

== Transport ==
- Free Enterprise I, a ferry in service with European Ferries between 1962 and 1980
- Free Enterprise II, a ferry in service with European Ferries between 1965 and 1982
- Free Enterprise III, a ferry in service with European Ferries between 1966 and 1984
- Herald of Free Enterprise, a ferry in service with European Ferries from 1980 until she sank in 1987
- Pride of Free Enterprise, a ferry in service with European Ferries & P&O Ferries between 1980 and 2001
- Spirit of Free Enterprise, a ferry in service with European Ferries & P&O Ferries between 1979 and 2003

== Other uses ==
- Free Enterprise, a newsletter published by the U.S. Chamber of Commerce
- Free Enterprise (film), a 1999 comedy/romance movie starring Eric McCormack and Rafer Weigel
- "Free Enterprise", a song by Rick Ross (featuring John Legend) from Black Market
- Free Enterprise Action Fund, was a mutual fund
- Free Enterprise Fund, a conservative fund-raising organization co-founded by Stephen Moore
- Free Enterprise, ABC television series starring Brian Hamilton (businessman)
