= MS Oujda =

Ferry built in 1974

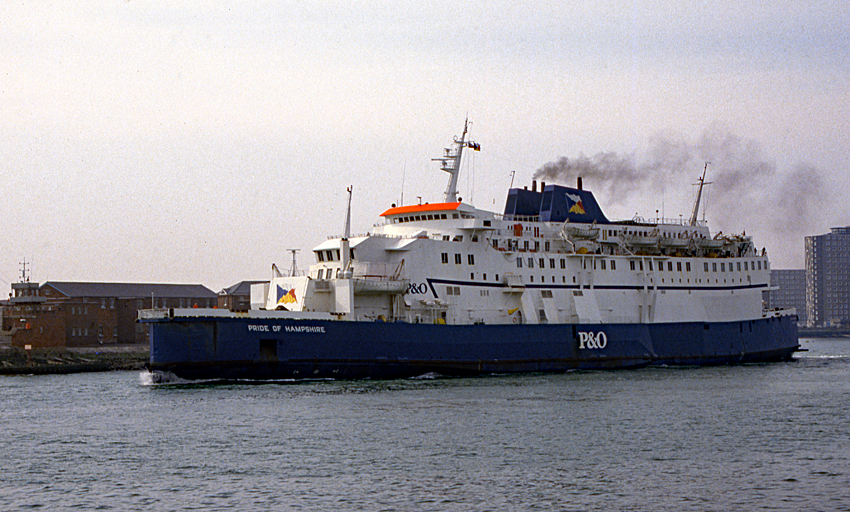
- Pride of Hampshire departing from Portsmouth

History
- Name: Viking Venturer (1974-1989); Pride of Hampshire (1989-2002); Pride of Al Salam 2 (2002-2004); Oujda (2004-2010)
- Owner: European Ferries (1974-1987); P&O Ferries (1987-2002); Seven Seas Marine (2002-2010)
- Port of registry: Panama; Portsmouth, UK (1994)
- Builder: Aalborg Værft AS
- Launched: 7 June 1974
- Out of service: 2010
- Identification: IMO number: 7358286
- Fate: Scrapped early 2010

General characteristics (Original)
- Tonnage: 6,387
- Length: 128.71 m
- Beam: 19.81 m
- Draught: 4.53 m
- Propulsion: Två Werkspoor 8TM410, En 9TM410 diesel
- Speed: 18 knots
- Capacity: 1,200 passengers; 275 cars

General characteristics (Extended)
- Tonnage: 14,760 Gross tons
- Length: 143.66 m
- Beam: 23.47 m
- Draught: 5.05 m
- Propulsion: Två Werkspoor 8TM410, En 9TM410 diesel
- Speed: 18 knots
- Capacity: 1,316 passengers; 380 cars

MS Oujda was a roll-on/roll off ferry built as Viking Venturer by Aalborg Værft AS in 1974 for Townsend Thoresen.

== History ==
Viking Venturer was initially put into service on the route from Southampton to Le Havre then latterly Portsmouth to Cherbourg. She was sold to P&O European Ferries and renamed Pride of Hampshire. With the takeover of Townsend Thoresen by P&O, and the sinking of the Herald of Free Enterprise in 1987, P&O wanted to drop the Townsend Thoresen name and the ship names associated with the company. She was repainted from her Townsend Thoresen orange and white livery to the new P&O blue and white, the TT logo on her funnel replaced by the P&O house flag. Townsend Thoresen became P&O European Ferries and in 1989 Viking Venturer became Pride of Hampshire. She continued to sail under that name until 2002. She was transferred to the Portsmouth-Cherbourg route in 1994 as a result of larger vessels Pride of Le Havre & Pride of Portsmouth being chartered for the Le Havre route.

In 1986, the ship was taken to Bremerhaven for "jumboisation", which added an extra deck to the ship, making it appear comparatively top heavy.

She was sold in 2002 after 27 years service on the English Channel. At the time she, was the eldest cross-channel ferry sailing from the United Kingdom.

Her new owner, El Salam Maritime, renamed her the Pride of Al Salam 2 then latterly Oujda sailing between Sète and Nador in her final days with a Panama flag.

She was sold for demolition in India in 2010.

== Sister ships ==
Viking Venturer was one of four sister ships ordered by Townsend Thoresen.

The other three were:

- Viking Valiant - later the Pride of Cherbourg ^{2}, then Mogador and was scrapped in May 2010.
- Viking Voyager - later Pride of Cherbourg ^{1}, now Samothraki.
- Viking Viscount - later Pride of Winchester, now Vitsentzos Kornaros.
