= Pride of Cherbourg =

Pride of Cherbourg may refer to the following ships:

- Pride of Cherbourg in service under this name 1989 – 1994 with P&O European Ferries
  - Pride of Cherbourg II in service under this name 1994 with P&O European Ferries
- Pride of Cherbourg in service under this name 1994 – 2002 with P&O European Ferries
  - Pride of Cherbourg A in service under this name 2002 with P&O Portsmouth
- Pride of Cherbourg in service under this name 2002 – 2005 with P&O Portsmouth & P&O Ferries
