= MS Viking Valiant =

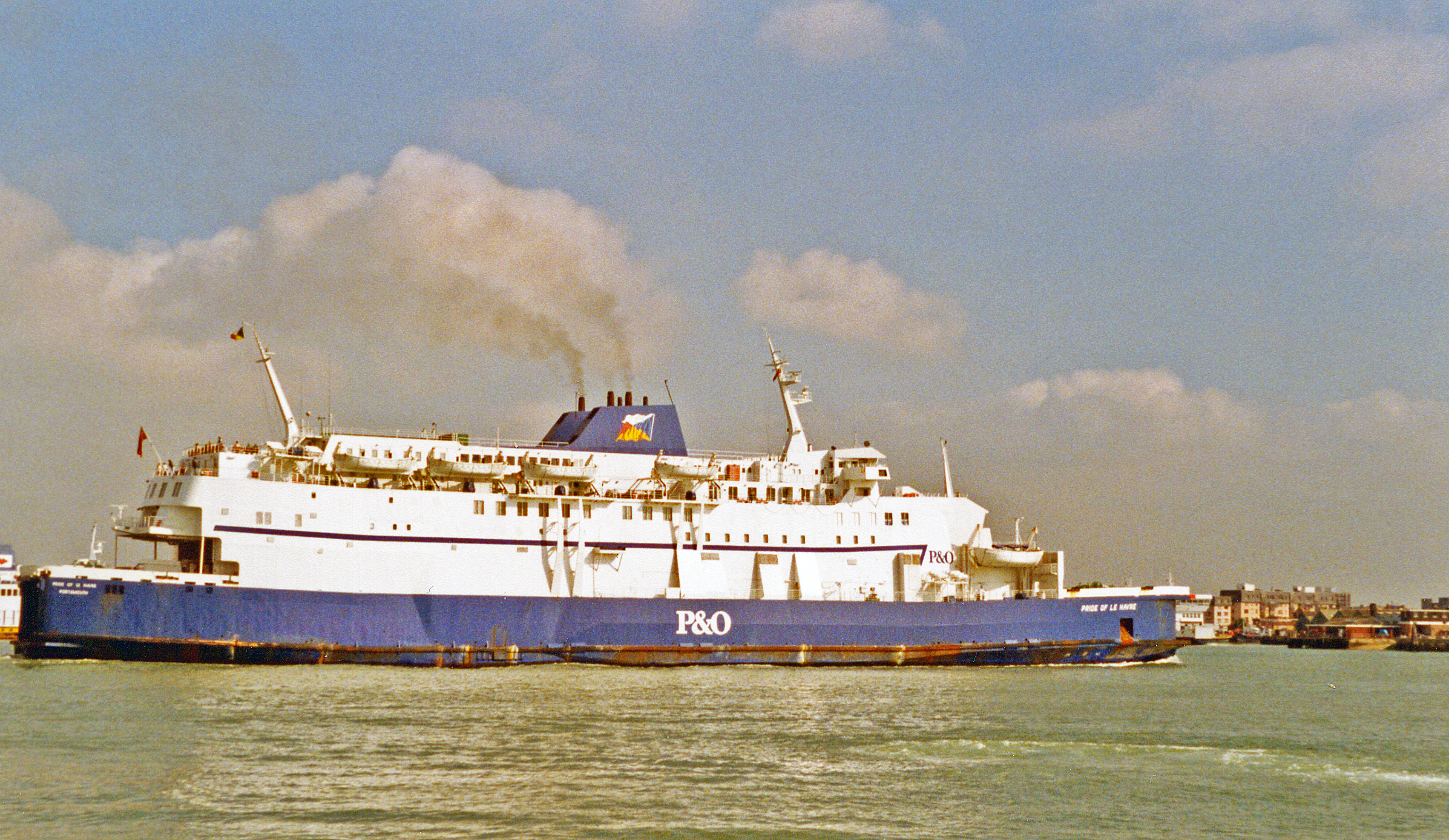
- 'Pride of Le Havre' leaving Portsmouth for Le Havre, 1993

History
- Name: Viking Valiant (1974–1989); Pride of Le Havre (1989–1994); Pride of Cherbourg^{2} (1994–2002); Pride of Cherbourg A (2002); Pride of Al Salam 1 (2002–2004); Nador (2004–2005); Mogador (2005–2010)
- Owner: European Ferries (1974–1987); P&O Ferries (1987–2002); Seven Seas Marine (2002–2010)
- Port of registry: Panama
- Builder: Aalborg Værft AS
- Yard number: 204
- Launched: 4 October 1974
- Out of service: 2010
- Identification: IMO number: 7358298
- Fate: Sold for Scrap, Early 2010

General characteristics (Original)
- Tonnage: 6,387
- Length: 128.71 m
- Beam: 19.81 m
- Draught: 4.53 m
- Propulsion: Two Werkspoor 8TM410, One 9TM410 diesels
- Speed: 18 knots
- Capacity: 1,200 passengers; 275 cars

General characteristics (Extended)
- Tonnage: 14,760
- Length: 143.66 m
- Beam: 23.47 m
- Draught: 5.05 m
- Propulsion: Two Werkspoor 8TM410, One 9TM410 diesels
- Speed: 18 knots
- Capacity: 1,316 passengers; 380 cars

Pride of Le Havre was the name of ferry for P&O Ferries that sailed between Portsmouth and Le Havre from 1989 to 1994. From launch until 1994, she was known as the Viking Valiant for Townsend Thoresen and P&O. In 1994 she was renamed Pride of Cherbourg^{2} for P&O and continued under this name until she was sold to El Salam Maritime in 2002. El Salam Maritime renamed her Pride of Al Salam 1 for El Salam Maritime. In 2004 she was renamed Nador and chartered to Comanav, she was again renamed Mogador for Comanav in 2005, sailing under this name until being scrapped in 2010.

== History ==
Pride of Le Havre was built in 1975 at Aalborgs Værft A/S, Ålborg, Denmark as Viking Valiant for Townsend Thoresen to operate between Southampton and Le Havre or Cherbourg. She also saw service between Felixstowe and Zeebrugge. In 1984, Townsend Thoresen moved its western channel passenger services from Southampton to Portsmouth. After two years sailing from Portsmouth, Viking Valiant was sent to Bremerhaven in 1986 to be enlarged in a process known as jumboisation. This involved removing the superstructure of the vessel from its original hull, adding an upper vehicle deck and reattaching the superstructure to mostly new hull, the stern section of the hull was retained for use as part of the new hull. The enlarged vessel re-entered service later that same year and sailed between Portsmouth and Le Havre.

With the takeover of Townsend Thoresen by P&O and the sinking of the Herald of Free Enterprise in 1987, P&O wanted to drop the Townsend Thoresen name and the ship names associated with the company. Later in 1987, Townsend Thoresen became P&O European Ferries. (Operations from Portsmouth were later branded "P&O Portsmouth".) In 1989, Viking Valiant became Pride of Le Havre ^{1}. She continued to sail under that name until 1994 when she was transferred to the Portsmouth-Cherbourg route as a result of the larger Pride of Le Havre ^{2} and MS Pride of Portsmouth being chartered for the Le Havre route. She was renamed Pride of Cherbourg ^{2}, the second vessel to carry that name, and sailed to Cherbourg with the odd period of refit cover on the Le Havre route until 2002 when she was replaced and sold by what was now P&O Ferries. Prior to her replacement she briefly carried the name Pride of Cherbourg A to free the original name for her replacement.

After her service with P&O she was sold to El Salam Maritime as the Pride of Al Salam 1. She was later chartered to Comanav and was then named Mogador with a Panama flag.

She was sold for demolition in India in early 2010 for $352 per ton.

== Sister ships ==
Viking Valiant was one of four sister ships ordered by Townsend Thoresen.

The other three were:

- Viking Venturer – later the Pride of Hampshire, ended up Oudja and was scrapped May 2010
- Viking Voyager – later Pride of Cherbourg (I), now Samothraki
- Viking Viscount – later Pride of Winchester, now Vitsentzos Kornaros
