= European Gateway =

North Sea ferry which sank in 1982

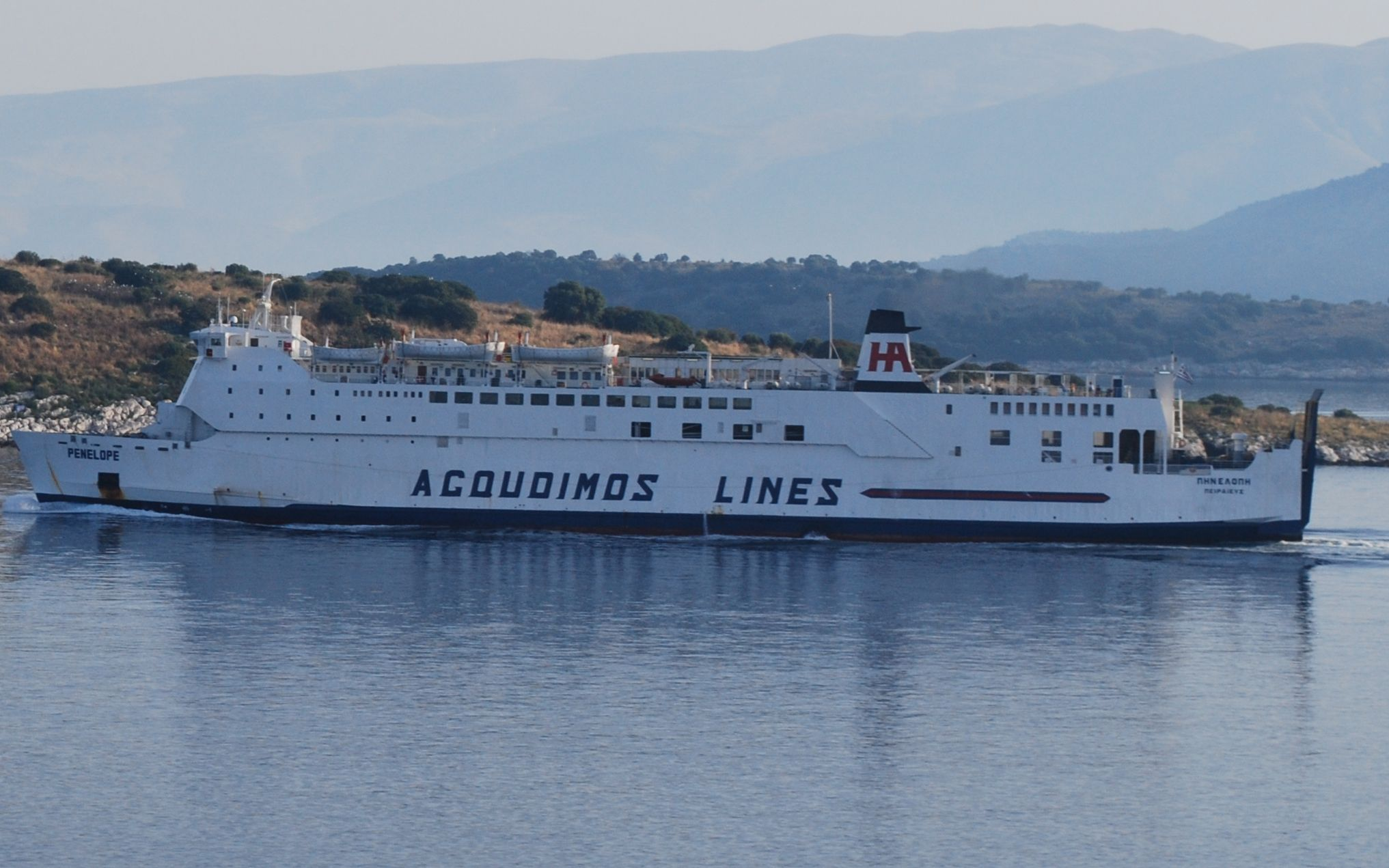
- Penelope in 2009.

History
- Name: Lopi (2013); Penelope (2005-2013); Penelope A (1999-2005); Rostock-Link (1992-1999); Travemünde-Link (1988-1992); Travemünde-Link I (1988); Flavia (1982-1988); European Gateway (1975-1982); European Express (1975)
- Owner: Okeanos Naftliaki Trading (1999-2013); R-L Shipping Ltd (1992-1999); Rederi Sea Link AB (1988-1992); Clorinda Maritime (1983-1988); Townsend Thoresen (1975-1982)
- Operator: Agoudimos Lines (1999-2013); Mols-Linien (1999); Amber Lines (1998-1999); Scandlines A/S (1997-1998); DSB Rederi (1996-1997); Europa Linien (1992-1996); GT Link (1988-1992); Anco Ferries (1982-1988); Townsend Thoresen (1975-1982)
- Port of registry: Piraeus, Greece
- Builder: Schichau-Unterweser, Bremerhaven, Germany
- Yard number: 2256
- Launched: 20 December 1974
- Maiden voyage: 1975
- In service: 1975
- Out of service: 2013
- Identification: IMO number: 7400261
- Fate: Scrapped 15 July 2013.

General characteristics
- Tonnage: 3,335 GT (1975-1980); 4,236 GT (1980-1984); 11,335 GT (1984-Present)
- Length: 117.76 m (386 ft 4 in) (1975-1980); 133.46 m (437 ft 10 in) (1980-Present)
- Beam: 20.27 m (66 ft 6 in)
- Draft: 5.81 m (19 ft 1 in)
- Propulsion: 2* Stork Werkspoor 9TM410RR
- Speed: 18 knots (33 km/h; 21 mph)
- Capacity: Passengers; 132 (1975-1980); 326 (1980-1984); 1,100 (1984-Present); Cars - 400

MS European Gateway was a roll-on roll-off (RORO) car and passenger ferry built in 1975, originally owned and operated by Townsend Thoresen. On 19 December 1982, she capsized following a collision with Speedlink Vanguard off Harwich, settling on a sandbank. The ship had 34 passengers and 36 crew at the time. Six people were killed in the capsizing. She was subsequently refloated and repaired, and served the Greek Islands as Penelope, until 2013 when she was scrapped at the Aliaga breakyards (Turkey)

== Sister Ships ==
The European Gateway has three sister ships:

- European Enterprise
- European Trader
- European Clearway

== See also ==
- Herald of Free Enterprise - Another ferry owned by Townsend Thoresen which sank.
- Harwich Lifeboat Station for description of The European Gateway Disaster.
