= MV Alpha Express =

A number of vessels have been named Alpha Express, including –

- MV Alpha Express (1973) (IMO number: 7325241), a ferry in service 1976–80
- MV Alpha Express (2000) (IMO number: 9222622), a chemical tanker in service 2000–09
