= MS al-Salam Boccaccio 98 =

Egyptian Ro/Ro passenger ferry

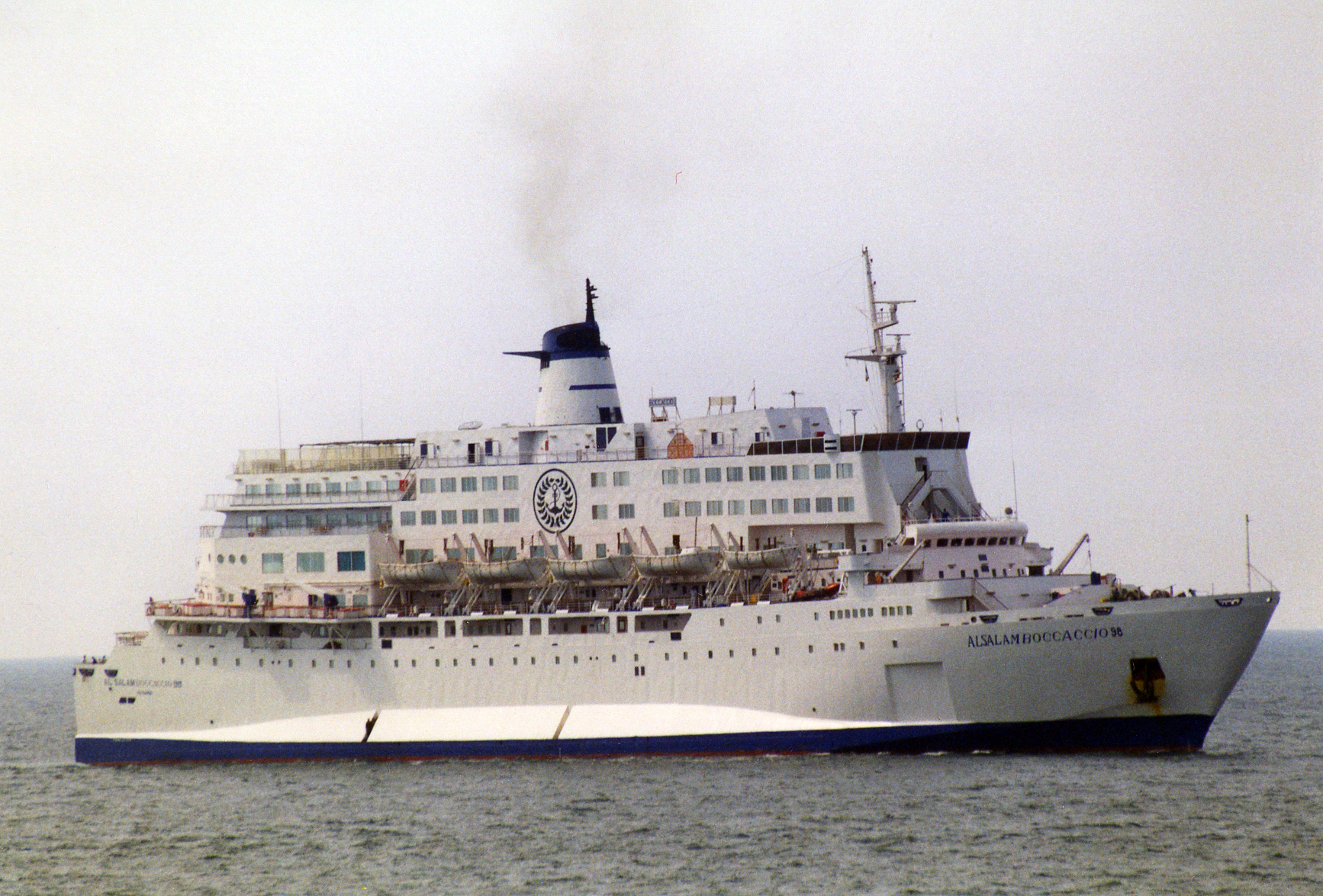
- al-Salam Boccaccio 98 in Genoa, 2001

History

Italy
- Name: Boccaccio
- Owner: Tirrenia di Navigazione
- Operator: Tirrenia di Navigazione
- Port of registry: Italy
- Builder: Italcantieri S.p.A. of Monfalcone, Italy
- Laid down: 22 August 1968
- Launched: 8 June 1969
- Completed: 30 June 1970
- Refit: 1991
- Identification: IMO number: 6921282
- Fate: Sold in 1999 to El Salam Maritime Transport.

Egypt
- Name: al-Salam Boccaccio 98
- Owner: Pacific Sunlight Marine Incorporated of Panama
- Operator: El Salam Maritime Transport
- Port of registry: Egypt
- Acquired: 1999
- Fate: Capsized and sank on 3 February 2006.

General characteristics
- Type: Ro/Ro passenger ferry
- Tonnage: 11,799 GT; 5,555 NT; 2,200 DWT
- Length: 130.99 m (429 ft 9 in)
- Beam: 23.6 m (77 ft 5 in)
- Draught: 5.57 m (18 ft 3 in) (as built); 5.9 m (19 ft 4 in) (after refit)
- Propulsion: 2 × 9-cylinder GMT-Fiat diesels; 16,560 kW (22,210 hp)
- Speed: 19 knots (35 km/h; 22 mph)
- Capacity: Passengers: 1,000 (as built); 1,310 (after refit); Car capacity: 200 (as built); 320 (after refit)
- Crew: 105

MS al-Salam Boccaccio 98 was an Egyptian ro/ro passenger ferry, operated by El Salam Maritime Transport, that sank on 3 February 2006 in the Red Sea en route from Duba, Saudi Arabia, to Safaga in southern Egypt.

The ship was carrying about 1,400 passengers and crew. The majority were thought to have been Egyptians working in Saudi Arabia, but they included pilgrims returning from the Hajj in Mecca. The ship was also carrying about 220 vehicles. No Mayday had been heard from the ship and poor weather conditions hampered the search and rescue operation. 388 people were rescued.

The immediate cause of the sinking appears to have been a buildup of seawater in the hull, when the firefighters were trying to extinguish a fire in the engine room. This was compounded by design faults inherent in ro/ro vessels, where minor flooding of the deck can gain rapid momentum due to the free surface effect. When the captain asked permission to return to port, the ship's owners ordered him to continue, despite knowing that there had been a fire. The owners were jailed in 2009 after their original acquittal was overturned.

== Ship history ==
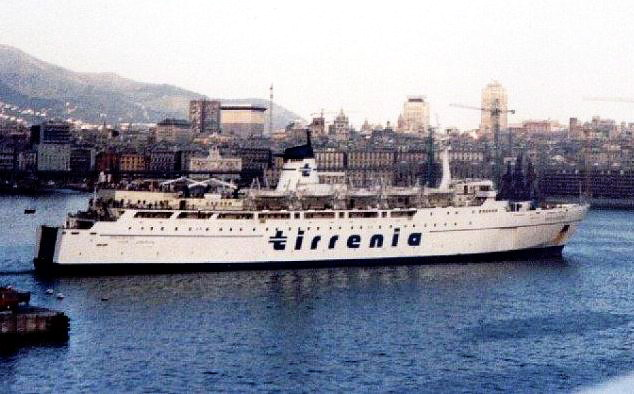
MS Boccaccio in Italian domestic service before rebuilding, in Tirrenia livery.

The vessel was built by the Italian company Italcantieri in 1970 with IMO number 6921282 and named Boccaccio at Monfalcone, Italy, for Tirrenia di Navigazione. She was originally intended for Italian domestic service. Her dimensions were 130.99 metres (429 ft 9 in) length overall with 23.60 m (77 ft 5 in) beam and 5.57 m (18 ft 3 in) draft. The main engines were rated at 16,560 kilowatts (22,210 hp) for a maximum speed of 19 knots (35 km/h; 22 mph). The vessel had an original capacity of 200 automobiles and 1,000 passengers. Five sister ships were built.

The vessel was rebuilt in 1991 by INMA at La Spezia, maintaining the same outer dimensions albeit with a higher superstructure, changing the draught to 5.90 m (19 ft 4 in). At the same time her automobile capacity was increased to 320 and the passenger capacity was increased to 1,300. The most recent tonnage was 11,799 gross tonnage (GT).

Boccaccio was purchased in 1999 by El Salam Maritime Transport, headquartered in Cairo, the largest private shipping company in Egypt and the Middle East, and renamed al-Salam Boccaccio 98 (Arabic: عبارة السلام 98, Arabic: سلام, romanized: Salam, lit. 'peace'); the registered owner was Pacific Sunlight Marine of Panama. She was also referred to as Salam 98.

== The sinking ==
The vessel's last known position was 100 kilometres (62 mi) from Duba, when it lost contact with the shore at about 22:00 EET (20:00 UTC). First reports of statements by survivors indicated that smoke from the engine room was followed by a fire which continued for some time. There were also reports of the ship listing soon after leaving port and that, after continuing for some hours, the list became severe and the ship capsized within 10 minutes as the crew fought the fire. In a BBC radio news broadcast an Egyptian ministerial spokesman said the fire had started in a storage area, was controlled, but started again. The significance of the fire was supported by statements attributed to crew members, who were reported to have claimed that "the firefighters essentially sank the ship when sea water they used to battle the fire collected in the hull because drainage pumps were not working."

=== Weather conditions ===
The Red Sea is known for its strong winds and tricky local currents. The region had been experiencing high winds and dust storms for several days at the time of the sinking. These winds may have contributed to the disaster and may have complicated rescue efforts.

The closest maritime weather report for 3 February 2006 00:00 UTC was from MV Glasgow Maersk, call sign MZGK7. Reporting from 27.00°N 34.40°E, approximately 150 km (93 mi) north-north-west of the sinking, the container ship shows winds of 24.1 knots (44.6 km/h; 27.7 mph) from 320 degrees, with a surface pressure of 1005 hPa. Sea temperature was 25 °C (77 °F) and a significant wave height of only 45 cm (18 in). Visibility was good (10 km, 6.2 mi), with 7/8 cloud cover. There was also an active weather front overlying the area, clearly visible in METEOSAT imagery.

=== Numbers on board ===
The ship was carrying 1,312 passengers and 96 crew members, according to Mamdouh Ismail, head of al-Salaam Maritime Transport Company. Earlier an Egyptian official had mentioned 1,310 passengers and 105 crew (however, the Egyptian presidential spokesman mentioned 98 crew, while the Transport Minister said 104).

=== Possible causes ===
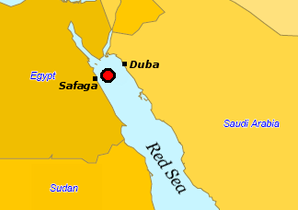
The reported point where the ship was last observed by coastal radar

Several theories have been put forward about possible causes of the sinking.

- Fire: Some survivors reported that there was a large fire on board before the ship sank, and there are eyewitness accounts of thick black smoke coming from the engine rooms.
- Design flaws: al-Salam Boccaccio 98 was a roll on-roll off (ro-ro) ferry. This design allows vehicles to drive on one end and drive off the other, meaning, in theory, neither the ship nor any of the vehicles onboard need to turn around at any point. It also means that the cargo hold is one long chamber going through the ship. To accomplish this, the vehicle bay doors must be near the waterline; unless these are sealed properly, water may leak through. Even a small amount of water moving about inside can gain momentum and capsize a ship, a phenomenon known as the free surface effect.
- Modifications: In the 1980s, the ship reportedly underwent several modifications, including the addition of two passenger decks and the widening of cargo decks. This may have destabilized the ship past its design limitations, particularly as its draught was only 5.9m. Combined with high winds, the tall ship could have been toppled easily.
- Vehicle movement: Another theory is that the rolling of the ship caused one or more of the vehicles in its hold to break loose and puncture a hole in the hull, thereby allowing seawater to flood into the vessel.

=== Search and rescue ===
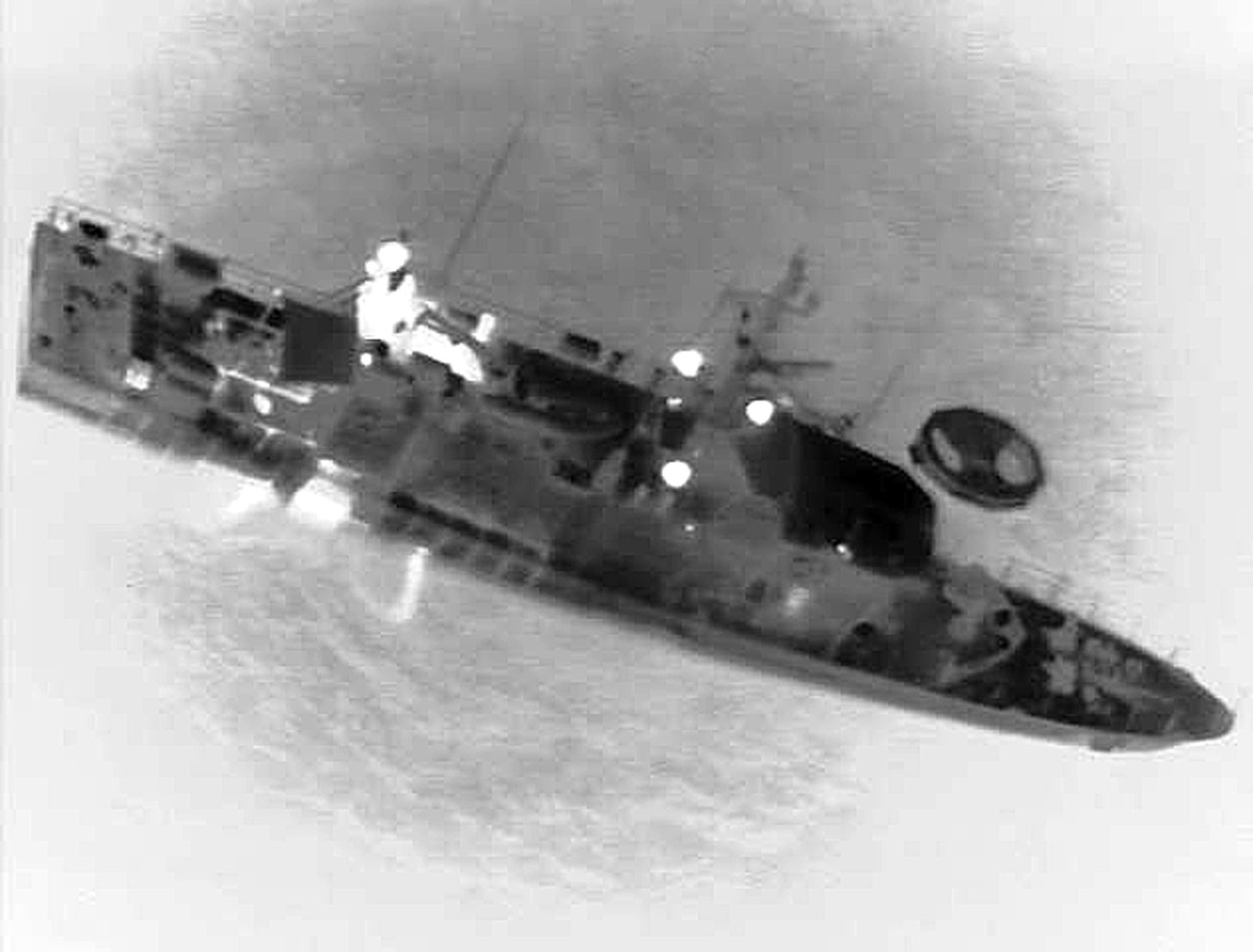
An infrared image from a U.S. Navy aircraft showing a rescue vessel alongside a life raft from al-Salam Boccaccio 98

At 23:58 UTC on 2 February 2006 the air-sea rescue control room at RAF Kinloss in Scotland detected an automatic distress signal relayed by satellite from the ship's position. The alert was passed on via France to the Egyptian authorities.

On 3 February 2006 some lifeboats and bodies were seen in the water. At least 314 survivors and around 185 dead bodies were recovered. Reuters reported that "dozens" of bodies were floating in the Red Sea.

Rescue boats and helicopters searched the area, including four Egyptian frigates. Italian Coastal Patrol Unit Ships patrolled for more than 90 hours in severe weather conditions, and eight survivors were rescued by MFO Esploratore-class vessels Vedetta and Sentinella. The United Kingdom diverted the warship HMS Bulwark which would have arrived in a day-and-a-half, but reports conflict as to whether or not the ship was recalled. Israeli sources report that an offer of search and rescue assistance from the Israeli Navy was declined. Egyptian authorities accepted a United States offer of a P-3 Orion maritime naval patrol aircraft after initially having said that the help was not needed.

Many survivors reported seeing the captain of the vessel being the first to leave the ship in a lifeboat [AP 2-04-06].

=== Similar incidents ===
- In 1915 SS Eastland was raised from the Chicago River after capsizing earlier the same year when the ship's limit of 2500 passengers was exceeded; a total of 844 passengers and crew were killed.
- The sinking of al-Salam Boccaccio 98 was compared to that of the 1987 Herald of Free Enterprise disaster, which killed 193 passengers.
- In 1991 another Egyptian ferry, Salem Express, sank off the coast of Egypt after hitting a small habili reef. 464 Egyptians lost their lives. The bodies were recovered and buried on land, as Islam forbids burial at sea.
- In 1994, the MS Estonia sank, claiming 852 lives.
- On 26 September 2002 the MV Le Joola, a Senegalese government-owned ferry, capsized off the coast of The Gambia killing at least 1,863 people.
- On 17 October 2005, Pride of al Salam 95 also sank in the Red Sea after being struck by the Cypriot-registered cargo ship Jebal Ali. In that accident, two people were killed and another 40 injured, some possibly during a stampede to leave the sinking ship. After evacuating all the ferry passengers and crew, Jebal Ali went astern and Pride of al Salam 95 sank in about 3½ minutes.

== Trial of owners ==
In July 2008 the owner of al-Salam Boccaccio 98, Mamdouh Ismail, along with his son Amr Ismail and two others were acquitted of wrongdoing in connection with the disaster by an Egyptian court. An earlier parliamentary inquiry blamed Ismail's company for the disaster, saying they had operated the ferry despite serious defects. Also, the recovered data recorder proved that the ferry's owner knew there had been a fire on board but gave orders to continue on instead of returning to port as the captain had requested. Family members of the victims felt the ruling was brought about by corruption as Ismail is a member of Egypt's upper house and is very well connected.

On 11 March 2009, after the initial acquittal was overturned in a hearing presided over by Judge Khaled Badereldin, Mamdouh Ismail was sentenced to seven years in prison. Two other employees of the company were sentenced to three years in prison each.

In May 2020, The Court of Justice of the European Union judged that The victims of the sinking of a vessel, which sailed under the flag of Panama, may bring an action for damages before the Italian courts against the Italian Classification Society RINA (Registro Italiano Navale), which classified and certified that vessel.
