= Pride of Bruges =

Pride of Bruges may refer to one of two ferries:

- Pride of Bruges in service under this name 1988–1999 with P&O European Ferries
- Pride of Bruges in service under this name 2003–2020 with P&O Ferries
