= MS Viking Voyager =

History
- Name: Samothraki (2005-2011); Barlovento (2000-2005); Banaderos (1994-2000); Pride of Cherbourg II (1994); Pride Of Cherbourg (1989-1994); Viking Voyager (1975-1989)
- Owner: SAOS Ferries (2005-2011); Fred. Olsen & Co. (1994-2005); P&O Ferries (1987-1994); European Ferries (1975-1987)
- Operator: SAOS Ferries (2005-2011); Fred Olsen Lines (1994-2005); P&O Ferries (1987-1994); European Ferries (1975-1987)
- Port of registry: Greece
- Builder: Aalborg Værft AS
- Yard number: 205
- Launched: 14 June 1975
- Completed: 1976
- Maiden voyage: 20 January 1976
- In service: 1976
- Out of service: 2007
- Identification: IMO number: 7358303
- Fate: Scrapped 22 July 2011

General characteristics
- Tonnage: 6,386
- Length: 128.81 m
- Beam: 19.81 m
- Draught: 4.54 m
- Speed: 19 knots
- Capacity: 918 passengers; 280 cars

The Viking Voyager was built by Aalborg Værft AS, Denmark in 1975 for European Ferries who traded as Townsend Thoresen. European Ferries Group was purchased by P&O and became P&O European Ferries and the ship was renamed Pride of Cherbourg in 1989.

== Early years ==
The vessel was launched on 14 June 1975, having been christened by the wife of European Ferries's Commercial Freight Director. She arrived in Felixstowe in January 1976 and began a service to Zeebrugge. She continued on this route until being transferred to the Southampton-Le Havre and Southampton-Cherbourg routes in 1986. In 1987 European Ferries was acquired by P&O, following which, under P&O's new branding scheme she was renamed Pride Of Cherbourg. In 1994 she was again renamed Pride of Cherbourg II to release the name for the Pride of Le Havre ^{1} which was being transferred to the Portsmouth-Cherbourg route following P&O's chartering of the Pride of Le Havre ^{2} and Pride of Portsmouth. Later in 1994, the vessel was sold by P&O to Fred. Olsen & Co..

== Post P&O ==
In 1994 P&O sold the Pride of Cherbourg II to Fred. Olsen & Co., the vessel was brought into service as the Bañaderos in the Canary Islands, she continued in this role, being renamed to Barlovento in 2000. In 2005 the Barlovento was replaced by the Benchijigua Express ^{3}, she was consequently sold to SAOS Ferries where she now runs a ferry service supporting the Greek Islands. She was laid up at Alexandroupoli port, after the closure of Saos Ferries, and she was auctioned to be removed from the port in the summer of 2011. She left the Alexandroupoli bound for Aliağa, to be broken up on 23 July 2011.

== Sister Ships ==
Viking Voyager was one of four sister ships ordered by Townsend Thoresen.

The other three were:

- Viking Valiant
- Viking Venturer
- Viking Viscount
