= MV Stena Shipper =

Three ships of Stena Line have been named Stena Shipper.

- MV Stena Shipper (1973)
- MV Stena Shipper (1977)
- MV Stena Shipper (1979)
