= Daily Gazette (Colchester) =

Newspaper in Essex

- Type: Daily newspaper
- Owner: USA Today Co.
- Publisher: Newsquest
- Editor: Gary Pearson
- Headquarters: 654 The Crescent, Colchester Business Park, CO4 9YQ, Colchester, UK
- Circulation: 3,148 (as of 2024)
- Website: gazette-news.co.uk

The Daily Gazette, often known as the Colchester Gazette, is a local daily newspaper covering the north-east Essex area of England. It is published by Newsquest.

== History ==
A newspaper called The Gazette was published in Colchester as a weekly title from 1877. It closed in 1970 when Essex County Newspapers launched the Evening Gazette, which came out daily, Monday to Friday. The evening paper's launch slogan was "Your town, your news, your newspaper".

Based in Culver Street and then North Hill in Colchester, the Evening Gazette covered the city as well as Braintree, Clacton, Harwich and Maldon.

The paper had a novel distribution system for home delivery which avoided traditional newsagents in favour of "drop-off mums", usually young mothers who took up to 400 copies each and distributed them to paper boys and girls who called at their homes.

According to the Audit Bureau of Circulations (UK), circulation hit a peak of 32,290 in Jan to June 1979 and bobbled around the 30,000 mark until 1990.

In 1998, the Gazette, then part of Newsquest, established the "This Is Essex" website in partnership with Northcliffe Media. It has maintained a constant online presence since then.

Like other local newspapers, sales of the Gazette fell from the late 1990s onwards, and plummeted in the 2010s mainly because of the effect of the internet. To try to offset this, a "town" early edition was launched: the "evening" was dropped from the newspaper's title and it became the Daily Gazette.

In mid-2008 the Newsquest press at Colchester closed and printing was moved to the company's plants in Oxford and Brighton, ending 38 years of newspapers produced "on the day".

In 2009 management and subediting of the newspaper, including the post of editor, were moved to Basildon, outside the paper's circulation area, and a tranche of editorial staff was made redundant. The National Union of Journalists claimed that this meant that "the daily paper in the area will effectively be an edition of the Basildon publication".

By 2016 the Daily Gazette was selling an average of 9,866 a day and by 2025 that figure had fallen to 3,801.

== Notable stories ==
The Evening Gazette was probably the first newspaper in the world to carry news of 9/11

In the evening paper's early days it scooped national newspapers with the story of Anne, Princess Royal sharing a first kiss with her future husband, British Army officer Mark Phillips, at Navyard Wharf, Harwich, the departure point for ferries to Germany. The couple married in 1973 and divorced in 1992.

In December 1982 the paper's reporters were on the spot after the European Gateway ferry was in a collision with the Harwich train ferry Speedlink Vanguard.

The Gazette provided extensive coverage of the White House Farm murders in August 1985. Wendy Brading, the chief reporter, went on to interview killer Jeremy Bamber in HM Prison Wakefield.

On September 11 2001, the paper's early-afternoon final-edition deadline and its home-town printing press meant it was probably the first newspaper in the world to carry news of the September 11 attacks. The Gazette was being sold on Colchester High Street by 2.55pm. The front page was designed by John Palfrey, the assistant chief sub-editor.

== Notable journalists ==
Gazette journalists have included Liz Curry (the author Liz Trenow), crime writer Mark Pryor, novelist Johanna Bell, mystery writer Lynne Milford, football writer Francis Ponder, and pop star Steve Harley.

== Colchester-based editors ==
· David Goulden (launch editor)

· John Gerard

· Peter Laurie

· Ken Runicles

· Martin McNeill

· Irene Kettle
