= Evening Gazette =

Evening Gazette is or was the name of several local newspapers:

United Kingdom

- Blackpool Gazette
- Colchester Evening Gazette
- Evening Gazette (Essex)
- Teesside Gazette's cover page title prior to 2014 (since then, simply The Gazette)

United States

- Reno Gazette-Journal, formed from the merger of the Nevada State Journal and the Reno Evening Gazette
- Telegram & Gazette, formed from the merger of Worcester Telegram and Evening Gazette in Worcester, Massachusetts
- Evening Gazette, Port Jervis, New York
