= MV Lina Trader =

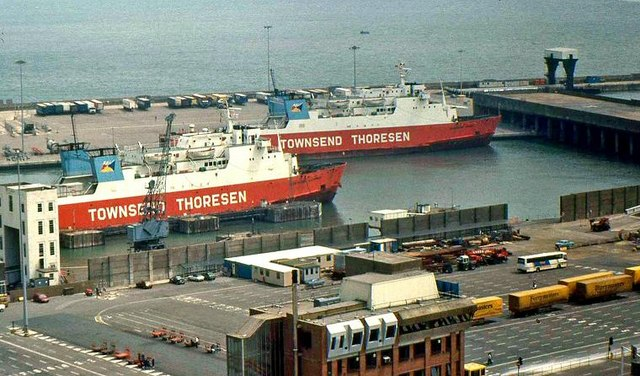
- Seen as European Trader at Dover with the MF Via Mare.

History
- Name: Lina (2006); Lina Trader (2001–2006); Taygran Trader (2001); European Trader (1975–1998)
- Owner: El Salam Shipping & Trading (2001-2006); Taygran Shipping (2001); Abbey National Leasing (1991-2001); P&O European Ferries Ltd. (1987-1991); Townsend Car Ferries Ltd. (1975-1987)
- Operator: El Salam Maritime (2003-2006); Superferries (2003); El Salam Maritime (2001-2003); P&O Irish Sea (1998-2001); P&O European Ferries (1987-1998); Townsend Thoresen (1975-1987)
- Port of registry: 1975–2001: London, United Kingdom; 1997–2001: Hamilton, Bermuda; 2001–2006: Panama City, Panama
- Ordered: 1 January 1974
- Builder: Schichau Unterweser AG, Germany
- Yard number: 2258
- Laid down: November 1974
- Launched: 30 May 1975
- Completed: 4 October 1975
- Out of service: 2006
- Identification: Call sign: H9UB; IMO number: 7400273; MMSI number: 354078000
- Fate: Scrapped in India in 2006

General characteristics
- Tonnage: 8,007 GT
- Length: 118.15 m (388 ft)
- Beam: 20.3 m (67 ft)
- Draught: 5.09 m (17 ft)
- Speed: 18.5 knots (34.3 km/h; 21.3 mph)

MV Lina was a freight ferry owned by El Salam Maritime and was scrapped in 2006 in India, the ship was formerly the European Trader with Townsend Thoresen.
