= Pride of Le Havre =

Pride of Le Havre may refer:

- Pride of Le Havre (1989) in service under this name 1989–1994; formerly Viking Valiant; later Pride of Cherbourg, Pride of Al Salam 1, Mogador
- Pride of Le Havre (1994) in service under this name 1994–2005; formerly Olau Hollandia; later SNAV Sardegna
