= Michael Turner (judge) =

British High Court judge

Sir Michael Turner FRGS

Justice of the High Court
- In office 1985–2002

Personal details
- Born: Michael John Turner Kensington, London

Sir Michael John Turner, FRGS (31 May 1931 – 7 October 2018) was a British barrister and judge. He was a High Court judge, sitting in the Queen's Bench Division, from 1985 until 2002.

== Biography ==
Born in Kensington, London, Michael Turner was the son of Theodore Francis Turner QC and of Elizabeth Alice, née Schuster, daughter of Claud Schuster, 1st Baron Schuster, He was educated at Westminster School and Magdalene College, Cambridge. After National Service with the 7th Hussars, he was called to the English bar by the Inner Temple in 1954. He specialised in insurance and personal injuries cases. He took silk in 1973. He had two children with his first wife, and another two when married to David Croom-Johnson's daughter.

Having served as a recorder from 1972 to 1985, Turner was appointed a Justice of the High Court in 1985, receiving the customary knighthood, and was assigned to the Queen's Bench Division. Among his important trials as a judge were the miners’ respiratory disease litigation against British Coal and the manslaughter trial against P&O European Ferries and seven others after the sinking of the Herald of Free Enterprise.
