= Barry Sheen =

British judge

Sir Barry Cross Sheen (31 August 1918 – 25 October 2005) was a British judge who served as Admiralty Judge of the High Court from 1978 to 1993. He is best known for presiding over the July 1987 inquiry into the deaths of 193 people in the Zeebrugge ferry disaster.

== Early life ==
The second son of Ronald Sheen, FCA, Barry Sheen was educated at Haileybury College, also attending The Hill School in the United States for a year. He began to read law at Trinity Hall, Cambridge, but his studies were interrupted by the outbreak of the Second World War. He joined the Royal Naval Volunteer Reserve, and was first lieutenant of the corvette HMS Aubretia when she captured the German submarine U-110, with her cypher books and Enigma machine, in 1941. In 1943, he was given command of the PCE-842-class patrol craft HMS Kilkenzie.
