= MS Anthi Marina =

Ferry operated by the GA Ferries

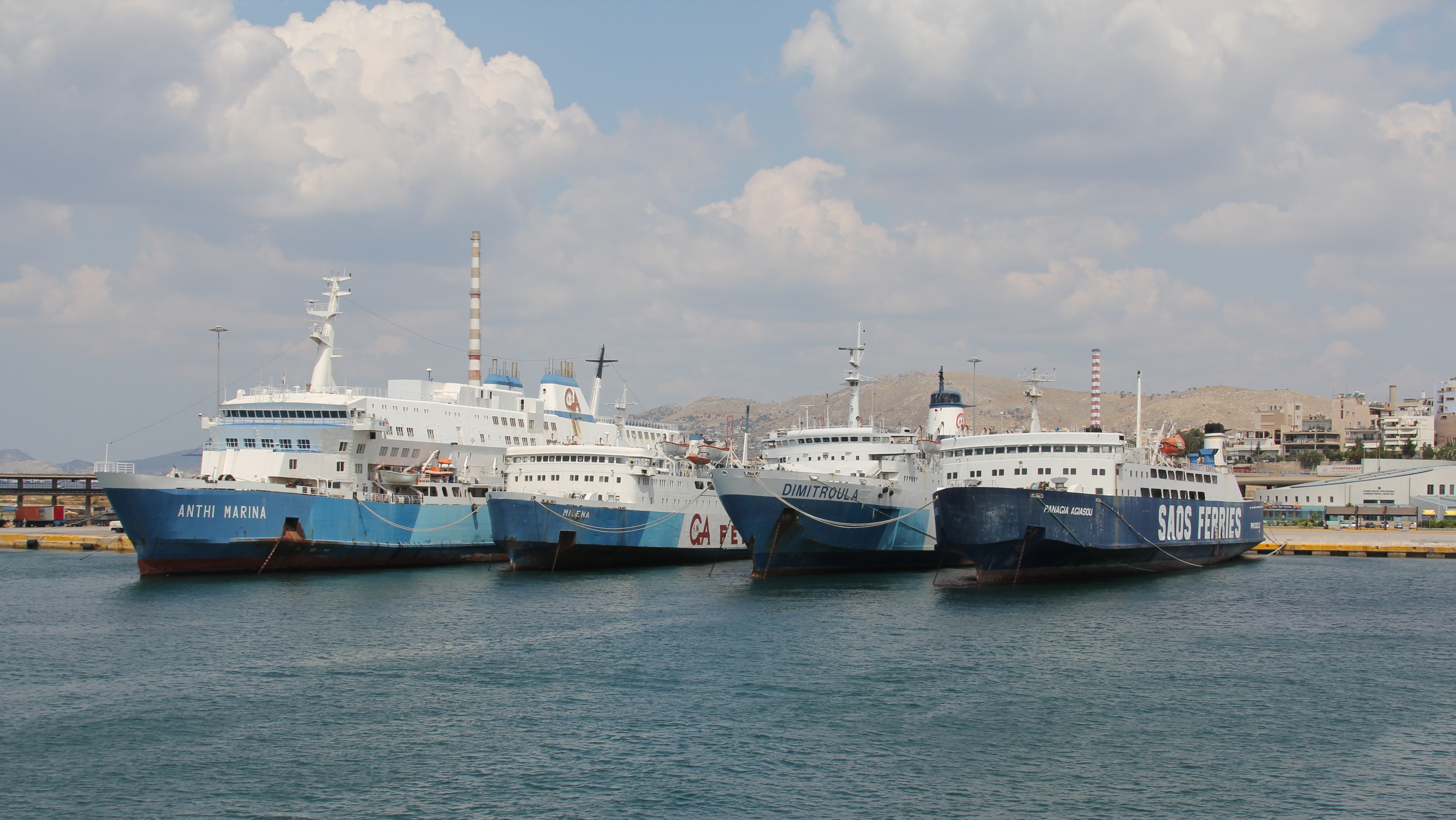
- Anthi Marina (far left) laid up at Piraeus.

History
- Name: Spirit of Free Enterprise (1979–1987); Pride of Kent (1987–1999); P&OSL Kent (1999–2002); PO Kent (2002–2003); Anthi Marina (2003–2012)
- Owner: Townsend Thoresen (1979–1987); P&O European Ferries (1987–2003); GA Ferries (2003–2012)
- Operator: Townsend Thoresen (1979–1987); P&O European Ferries (1987–1998); P&O Stena Line (1998–2002); P&O Ferries (2002–2003); GA Ferries (2003–2012)
- Port of registry: Piraeus, Greece (2003–2012)
- Ordered: 1979
- Launched: 21 July 1979
- Completed: 1980
- Maiden voyage: 1980
- In service: 1980
- Out of service: 2008
- Identification: IMO number: 7820473
- Fate: Scrapped at Aliağa, Turkey in 2012.

General characteristics
- Tonnage: 7,950 GRT
- Length: 131.91 m (432 ft 9 in)
- Beam: 23.19 m (76 ft 1 in)
- Draught: 5.72 m (18 ft 9 in)
- Speed: 22 knots (41 km/h; 25 mph)
- Capacity: 1,300 passengers

Anthi Marina was a ferry operated by GA Ferries. She was the first of three Spirit-class ferries built for Townsend Thoresen, as Spirit of Free Enterprise. Her two sister ships were Pride of Free Enterprise and Herald of Free Enterprise.

== As Spirit of Free Enterprise ==
Spirit of Free Enterprise operated reliably and successfully on Townsend's routes from her delivery in 1980 until the company was bought by P&O in 1987. In the same year, her identical sister ship Herald of Free Enterprise capsized while leaving Zeebrugge. The design of the ship was not found to be at fault, and after fitting of cameras to allow monitoring of the bow doors from the bridge she continued in service.

== As Pride of Kent ==
In the aftermath of the sinking of Herald of Free Enterprise, P&O moved to change the appearance of the fleet. The Townsend red and white hull with light blue funnels was replaced with the P&O darker blue and white, and the old Townsend "Free Enterprise" names were replaced. Spirit of Free Enterprise became Pride of Kent in late 1987. In 1991 Pride of Kent was extended in a process often known as "Jumboisation". The ship was cut in half and a new hull and superstructure section 31 metres (102 ft) in length was inserted amidships, raising her passenger capacity to 1,825 and her car capacity to 460. The work cost £20m and took six months. In 1998 she was renamed P&OSL Kent following the merger of P&O European Ferries and Stena Line on the Dover–Calais route, and later "P O Kent" in August 2002 (following P&O's buyout of Stena Line's 40% share in the joint venture). In early 2003 the ship was sold by P&O after a brief lay-up period in Dunkirk. She has been replaced by another ship again named Pride of Kent, an extensive rebuild of a former freight ferry.

== As Anthi Marina ==
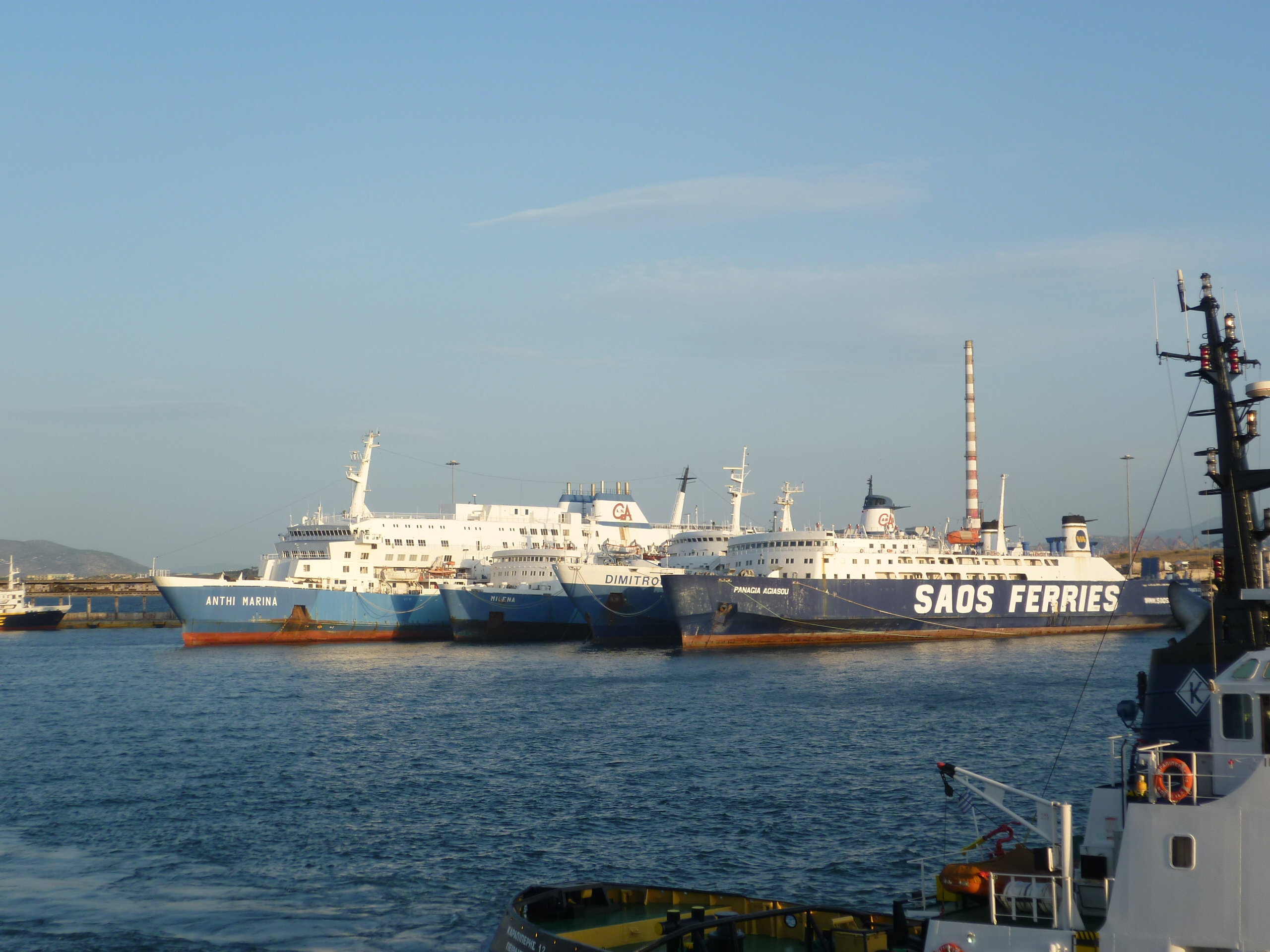
Anthi Marina laid up at Piraeus

In 2003 she was named Anthi Marina and operated by GA Ferries between Piraeus, Kos and Rhodes. In addition to the jumboising carried out by P&O she then had a more conventionally shaped bow in place of her original clamshell doors, and an internal ramp to enable her upper car deck to be used in ports without double-deck linkspans. As most Greek ports lack the linkspans found elsewhere, the ship was usually docked stern-on to the quayside and vehicles loaded via a ramp mounted on the ship. She was laid up in 2009 due to her owner's financial difficulties, and she was scrapped in 2012.
