= MF Via Mare =

Cargo ship

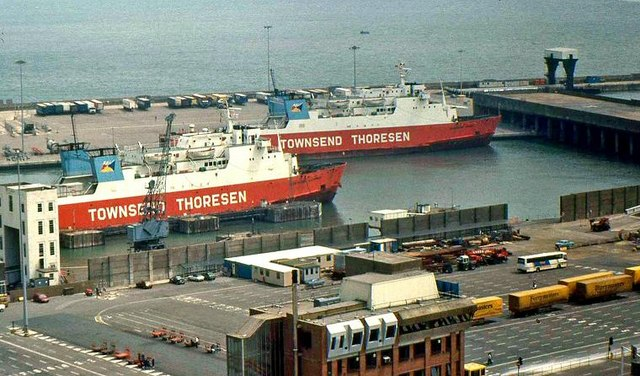
- Dover Eastern Docks in 1987. The 'European Clearway' is on the left and the 'European Trader' on the right

History
- Name: 1976 – 1996: European Clearway; 1996 – 1998: Panther; 1998 – 2002: European Pathfinder; 2002 – 2002: Regina I; 2002 – 2005: Begonia; 2005–present: Via Mare
- Owner: 1976 – 1987: Townsend Thoresen; 1987 – 2002: P&O; 2002 – 2002: Erato Shipping; 2002 – 2005: Transeuropa Ferries; 2005–2012: Baltic Scandinavian Lines; 2012–present: Akgünler Denizcilik
- Operator: 1976 – 1987 Townsend Thoresen; 1987 – 1993: P&O European Ferries; 1993 – 1998: Pandoro Ltd; 1998 – 2002: P&O Irish Sea; 2002 – 2002: Erato Shipping; 2002 – 2005: Transeuropa Ferries; 2005–2012: Baltic Scandinavian Lines; 2012–present: Akgünler Denizcilik
- Port of registry: 1976 – 2002: Dover, UK; 2002 – 2005: Kingstown, Saint Vincent and the Grenadines; 2005 – unknown: Tallinn, Estonia; unknown – present: Tasucu Turkey
- Route: 1976 – 1992: Dover-Zeebrugge; 1992 – 1993: Portsmouth-Le Havre; 1993 – 2001: Rosslare-Cherbourg; 2001 – 2002: Larne-Cairnryan; 2002 – 2005: Ramsgate-Ostend; 2005 – unknown: Kapellskär-Paldiski; unknown – Present: Tasucu-Kyrenia
- Builder: Schichau Unterweser, Germany
- Yard number: 2263
- Laid down: 25 April 1975
- Launched: 10 October 1975
- Completed: 16 January 1976
- In service: 1976
- Identification: IMO number: 7411258

General characteristics
- Tonnage: 8,023 GT
- Length: 117.85 m (386.6 ft)
- Beam: 20.27 m (66.5 ft)
- Draught: 5.82 m (19.1 ft)
- Propulsion: Two Stork Werkspoor 9TM410
- Speed: 18.4 kn (34.1 km/h)

The Via Mare is a ro-pax ship which is owned and operated by Baltic Scandinavian Lines.

== History ==
The Via Mare was launched for Townsend Thoresen as the European Clearway in 1976 for use on their Dover – Zeebrugge route. Townsend Thoresen was absorbed by P&O European Ferries in 1987, retaining the European Clearway before transferring it to Pandoro, another section of P&O. In 1992 European Clearway was transferred to the Portsmouth – Le Havre route In 1993 she was transferred to the Rosslare – Cherbourg route. In 1996 Pandoro renamed the ship Panther, in keeping with the animal names of the other ships in their fleet. Two years later the name was changed again, this time to European Pathfinder when Pandoro Ltd. merged with P&O European (Felixstowe) Ltd. to form P&O Irish Sea.

The vessel suffered a serious fire on 26 November 1997 when 35 miles out from Rosslare on passage to Cherbourg, but was repaired at Birkenhead and returned to service.

She was transferred to the Larne-Cairnryan route in April 2001 to replace the European Trader which had been sold. Unfortunately her port main engine failed in June 2002 and was not repaired, resulting in the final month of operation being at 10 kt on one engine. She was laid up in Liverpool in July 2002 and spent several months awaiting a buyer. In October 2002 the vessel was briefly owned by Erato Shipping of Greece and renamed Regina I but was very quickly sold to Transeuropa Ferries for use on its Ramsgate to Ostend service, being renamed Begonia. Her first voyage from Ostend to Ramsgate was on 11 February 2004, following a refit which took over a year. On 8 July 2005 she was sold to Baltic Scandinavian Lines for use on their Kapellskär – Paldiski route.

== Sister ships ==
- M/F Gardenia – originally European Enterprise
- Lina Trader – originally European Trader
- Penelope – originally European Gateway (laid down as European Express)
