= MS Free Enterprise II =

Ferry in service with European Ferries, 1965–1982

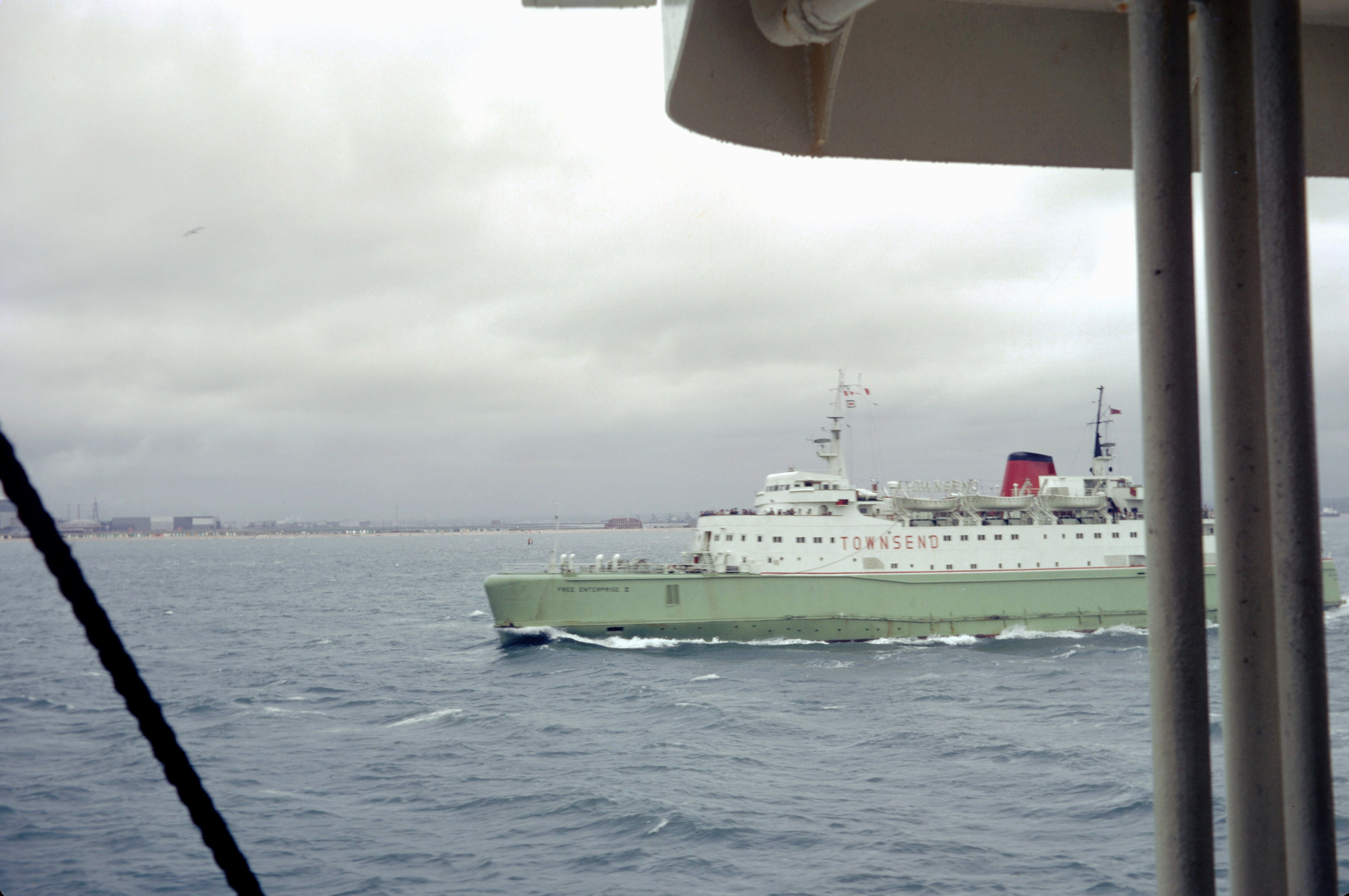

History

United Kingdom
- Name: Free Enterprise II; 1982: Moby Blu
- Owner: Townsend Bros. Ferries Ltd.; 1982: Moby Lines
- Operator: Townsend Thoresen, Dover, England.
- Route: Dover-Calais (1966-1969); Dover-Zeebrugge (1968-1970); Southampton-Cherbourg (1970-1974)
- Builder: N.V. Werf "Gusto", Schiedam, Rotterdam; Engines: J. & K. Smit, Kinderdijk
- Yard number: 502
- Laid down: August 1964
- Launched: 29 January 1965
- Identification: IMO number: 6506317
- Fate: 2003: sold to Indian breakers

General characteristics
- Type: Ferry
- Displacement: 4,011 gross
- Length: Length on deck - 108.11m (354.7 ft) (overall) 98.50m (323.2 ft) (between perpendiculars)
- Height: 9.66m (31.7 ft) (moulded)
- Draught: 4.00m (13.2 ft) (maximum)
- Installed power: 2x 12-cylinder Smit-M.A.N. RBL6612 four-stroke single acting diesels. Power 5664 kW
- Speed: 19.0 knots
- Capacity: 1,200 passengers, 230 cars

MS Free Enterprise II was a cross-Channel ferry operated by Townsend Thoresen between 1965 and 1982. The ship features prominently in the comedy film San Ferry Ann. In later life as Moby Blu she served Corsica and Elba.

== History ==
Free Enterprise II was built by I.C.H. Holland, Werf Gusto Yard, Schiedam, Netherlands in 1965 for Townsend Brothers Ferries (later Townsend Thoresen). In November 2003, she was sold to Indian breakers St Vincent/ Grenadines, renamed Moby and sent to Alang, India for breaking.

=== Service ===
Free Enterprise II operated on the Dover–Calais, Dover–Zeebrugge and Southampton–Cherbourg routes throughout the mid to late 1960s and the 1970s. In 1980 she was chartered by Sealink and used on the Portsmouth–Cherbourg route.

In 1982, she was acquired by the NAVARMA/Moby fleet and renamed Moby Blu. They used her on routes to Corsica and then on the Piombino–Elba service.
