= Pride of Winchester =

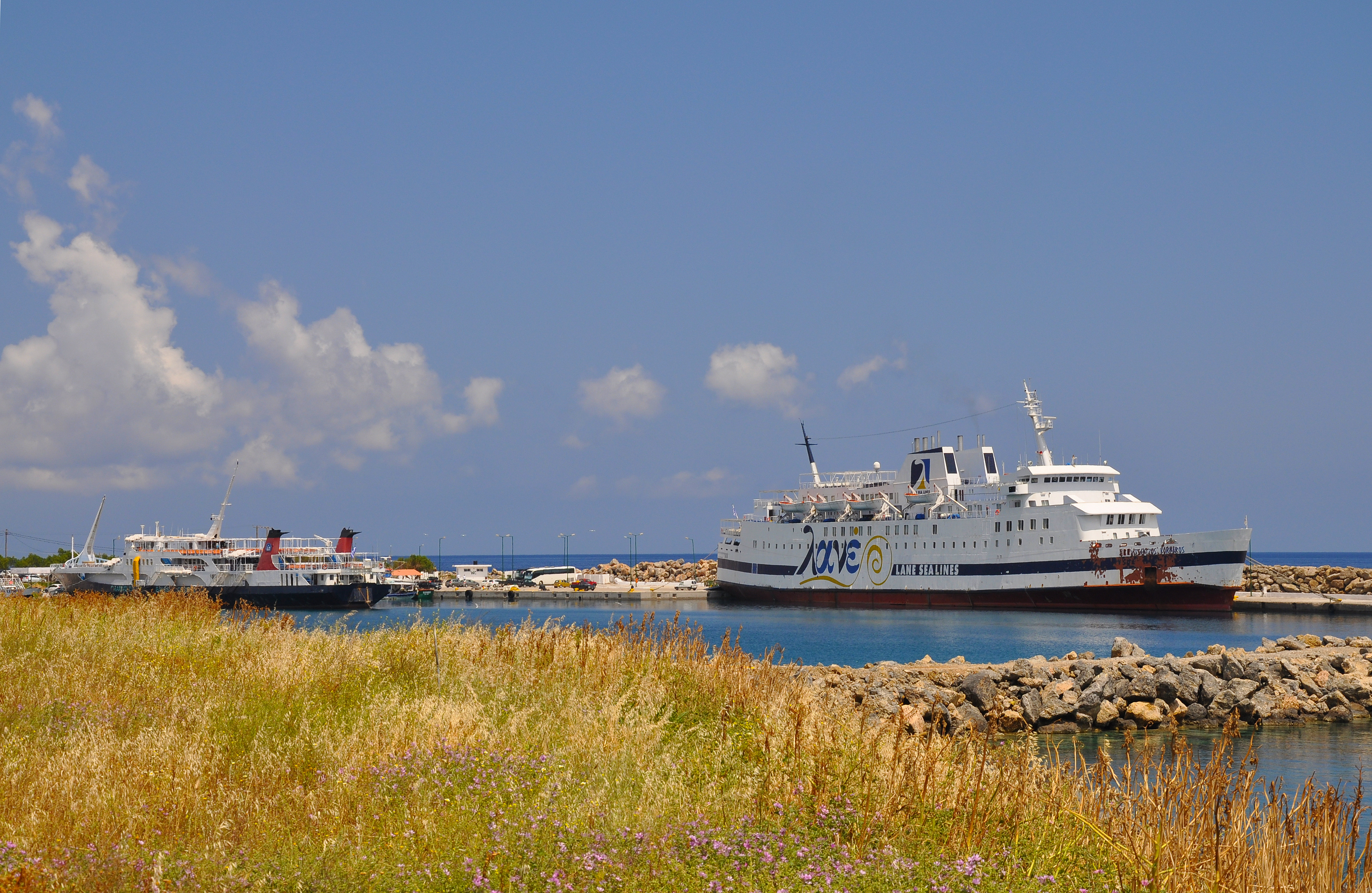

History
- Name: Viking Viscount (1975-1989); Pride of Winchester (1989-1994); Vitsentzos Kornaros (1994-2020)
- Owner: European Ferries (1975 - 1987); P&O Ferries (1987 - 1994); Lasithiotiki (1994 - 2017)
- Operator: Lane Sea Lines (1994 - 2017)
- Port of registry: UK (1976 - 1994) Greece (1994 - 2020)
- Builder: Aalborg Værft AS
- Yard number: 206
- Launched: 7 November 1975
- Completed: 1976
- Maiden voyage: 1976
- In service: 1976
- Out of service: 2017
- Identification: IMO number: 7358327
- Fate: Scrapped in Aliaga, Turkey in 2020

General characteristics
- Tonnage: 6,386
- Length: 128.71 m
- Beam: 19.81 m
- Draught: 4.53 m
- Speed: 21 knots
- Capacity: 1,100 passengers; 260 cars

The Pride of Winchester, was a UK Ro-Ro/Passenger ferry, which was part of P&O European Ferries' fleet. She was built in 1975 by Aalborg as the Viking Viscount for Townsend Thoresen and was put into service by P&O European Ferries in 1989, when European Ferries Group was purchased by P&O. She was named after Winchester, a city in Hampshire, England.

The ship was originally deployed on the Felixstowe to Zeebrugge route she was later transferred to the Portsmouth to Cherbourg route until 1994 when she was replaced by a bigger ship, the original Pride of Le Havre. She also operated on the Calais-Dover line. In 1995 was sold to Lane Sea Lines, a Greek company for the Piraeus, Milos, Agios Nikolaos, Sitia route. Then the ship did the Piraeus, Kithira, Antikythera, Githio, Kalamata, Kisamos route. During the Summer of 2017 Vitsentzos Kornaros had a problem with her engines and then was laid-up in Kinosoura, Greece. In April 2020 Vitsentzos Kornaros was sold for scrap in Aliaga, Turkey.

== Characteristics ==
Vitsentzos Kornaros could hold up to 1200 passengers and 275 private cars. and was powered by three main engines (2 Werkspoor 8TM410 and 1 Werkspoor 9TM410 diesel). with a combined power of 10,655 KW and reached speeds of up to 18 knots. She had stabilizers for sailing in wild sea and -after coming to Greece- cabins for night routes. Her capacity was 6,387 gt.

== History ==
The ship was built in 1976 in Denmark as the Viking Viscount for Townsend Thoresen. In 1989, with the creation of P&O European Ferries (which succeeded Townsend Thoresen) she received the name Pride of Winchester. In 1994, she came to Greece, bought by LANE Sea Lines and underwent a small-scale reconstruction to which cabins were added. Her first route was Piraeus - Milos - Agios Nikolaos - Sitia, but along the way she was launched on other lines such as the line Piraeus-Milos-Santorini-Anafi-Crete-Kaso-Karpathos-Halki-Rhodes and Piraeus-Gythio-Kythira-Antikythira-Kissamos, sometimes approaching Kalamata. The ship also operated at the Rhodes-Alexandroupolis link.

=== The end ===
On 16 June 2017, after 41 years of uninterrupted operation, the ship was stranded in Piraeus due to a mechanical breakdown. The company hoped she would be repaired by 30 June, but the damage was large and the company could not allocate money to repair her, while in case of final withdrawal would have to pay a clause of 480,000 euros. On 17 July it was declared abandoned by the line of Kythera and a tender was announced for the launch of a new ship. In September 2017, she was transferred to Kinosura, Salamina, and at the end of February 2019, a tender was announced for her removal, which was fruitless, while others followed. Finally, in 2020, she was sold to Turkish shipbreakers and was towed to the Aliaga scrap yard for dismantling.

=== Unsolved death ===
A 22-year-old man, Kevin Dundon, from Essex, went missing while working aboard the vessel as it was returning to Felixstowe from Zeebrugge in Belgium, on 21 September 1980. His body was not found and his brothers believe his death may have been suspicious.
