= Seaspeed Dora =

Cargo ship

Seaspeed Dora was a Greek owned roll-on/roll-off ferry which capsized on the discharge berth at Jeddah, Saudi Arabia, on 1 June 1977. Cargo that had been loaded in various ports in Europe was being unloaded in Jeddah when the ship capsized and sank along with all the cargo that remained on board. The ship was repaired and later sailed under various names for various carriers until finally being scrapped as the Gumel in 2011.
