= MS Pride of Free Enterprise =

Ferry, 1980–2015

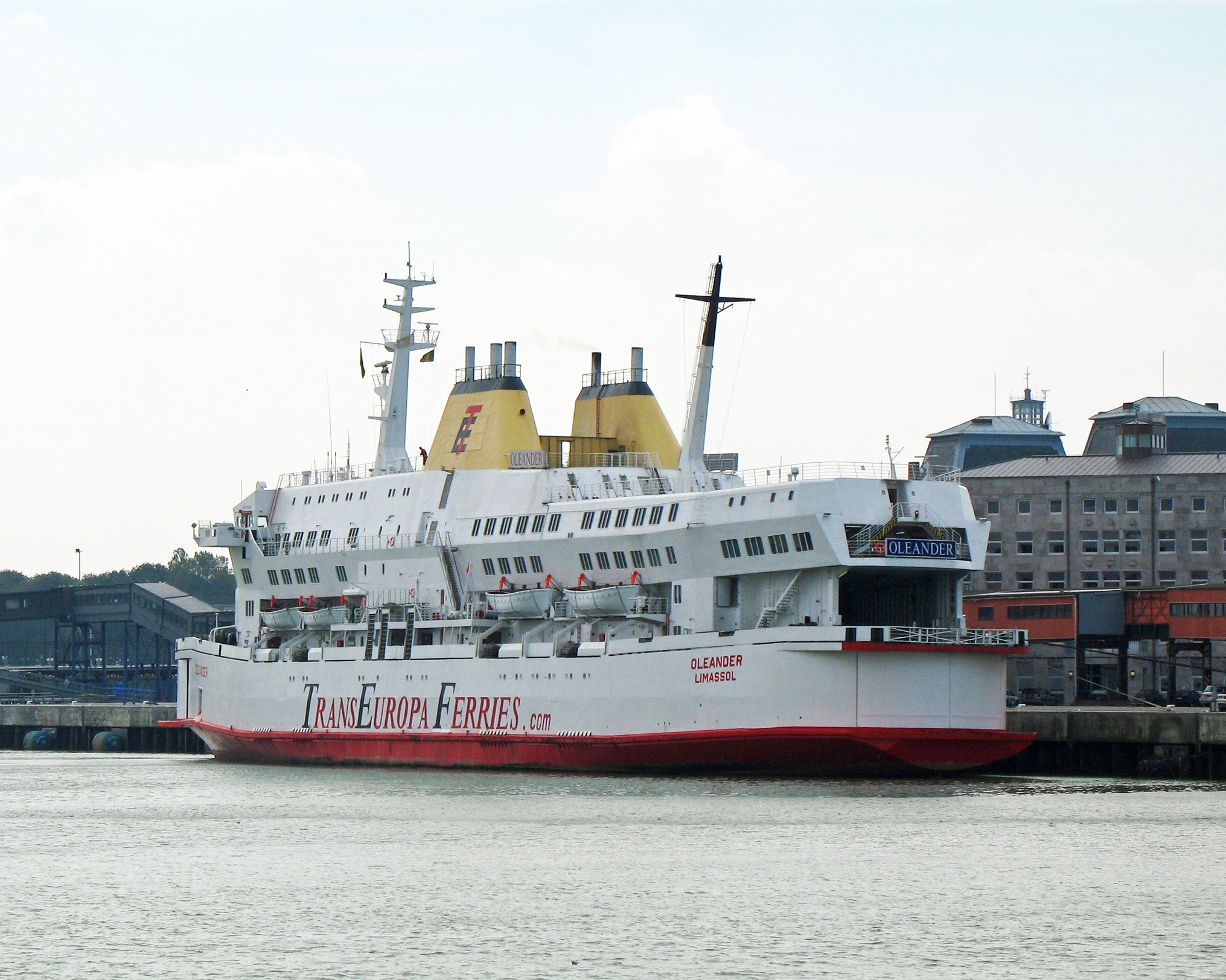
- Oleander at Ostend.

History
- Name: Sher (2015–2015); Sherbatskiy (2013–2015); Oleander (2001–2013); P&OSL Picardy (1999–2001); Pride of Bruges (1987–1999); Pride of Free Enterprise (1980–1987)
- Owner: Novgorod Shipping Ltd (2013–2015); Seabourne Navigational Company Limited (2001–2013); P&O European Ferries (1987–2001); Townsend Thoresen (1980–1987)
- Operator: Acciona Trasmediterranea (2013–2013); Ferrimaroc (2012–2012); Comarit (2010–2011); TransEuropa Ferries (2001–2010); P&O Stena Line (1998–2001); P&O European Ferries (1987–1998); Townsend Thoresen (1980–1987)
- Port of registry: Limassol, Cyprus (2001–2015); Dover, United Kingdom (1980–2001)
- Builder: Schichau Unterweser AG, Germany
- Yard number: 2281
- Launched: 31 May 1980
- Completed: 1980
- Maiden voyage: 1980
- In service: 1980
- Out of service: 2015
- Identification: Call sign: P3ZJ8; IMO number: 7820497; MMSI number: 210422000
- Fate: Scrapped at Alang, India in 2015.

General characteristics
- Tonnage: 13,728
- Length: 132.5 m (434 ft 9 in)
- Beam: 23.15 m (75 ft 11 in)
- Draught: 5.72 m (18 ft 9 in)
- Installed power: 24000 bhp
- Propulsion: 3 × Sulzer 12ZV40/48 engines
- Speed: 22 knots (41 km/h; 25 mph)
- Capacity: 1,326 passengers

MS Pride of Free Enterprise was a roll-on/roll-off passenger and freight ferry. Originally built for European Ferries in 1980, she subsequently operated under the names Pride of Bruges (1987–1999), P&OSL Picardy (1999–2001), Oleander (2001–2013), and Sherbatskiy (2013–2015). She was scrapped at Alang Ship Breaking Yard in late 2015 under the name Sher.

== History ==
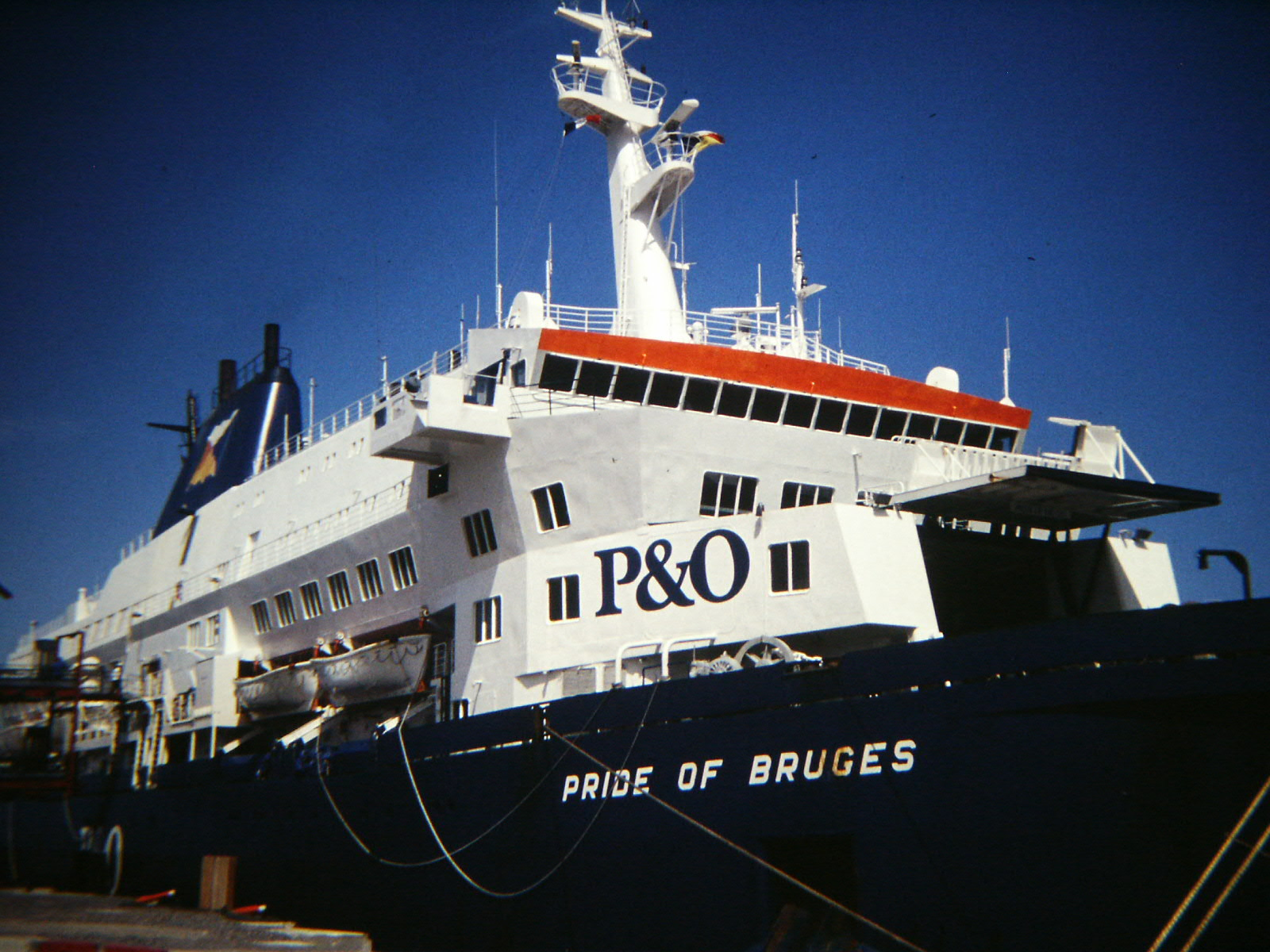
Pride of Bruges in 1993

Pride of Free Enterprise was built by Schichau Unterweser AG for European Ferries services between Dover and Calais, initially entering service with them in 1980. In 1987 European Ferries was purchased by P&O European Ferries; in the same year her sister ship, Herald of Free Enterprise capsized just outside Zeebrugge. As a result of these two events, Pride of Free Enterprise was renamed Pride of Bruges under a rebranding exercise undertaken by P&O following the bad publicity of the Herald of Free Enterprise disaster. P&O Ferries would later use the Pride of Bruges name for another vessel between 2003 and 2020.

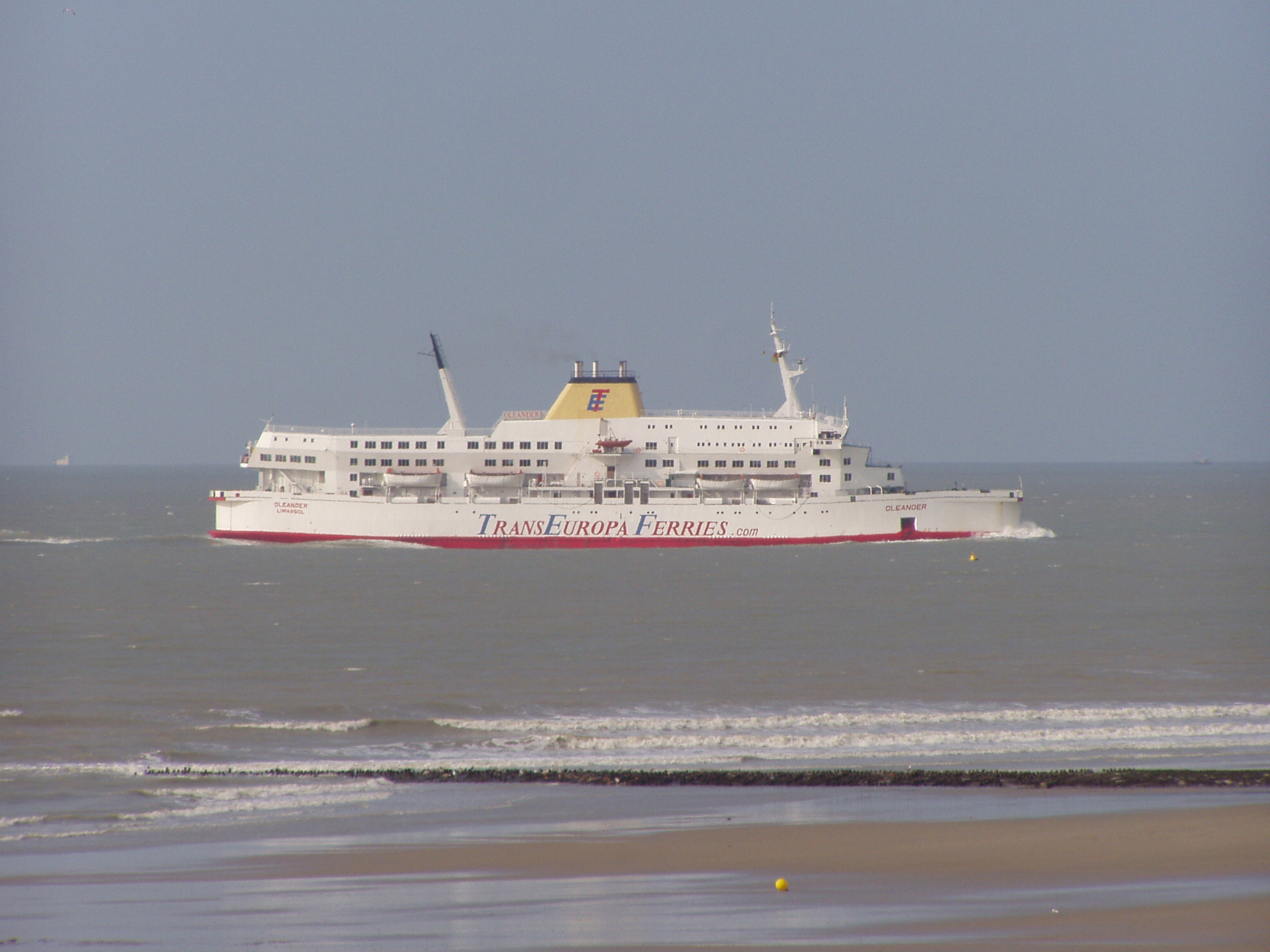
MS Oleander approaching Ostend

In 1998 P&O European Ferries merged its Short sea routes with Stena Line to form P&O Stena Line. As a result of this merger the vessels were again rebranded, this time the vessel was renamed to P&OSL Picardy. In 2000 P&OSL Picardy was laid up pending sale, eventually being sold to Transeuropa Ferries.

Transeuropa Ferries renamed the vessel Oleander and introduced a freight only service between Ramsgate and Ostend which began on 4 July 2002. Two years later, on 20 July 2004 Oleander was joined by Larkspur to provide a joint passenger/freight service also operating between the two ports. From 2010 onwards Oleander was often sailing on the Spain - Morocco lines on short term leases from TEF to Comarit or FerriMaroc. When TEF went into bankruptcy in April 2013 the Oleander moved on more permanent basis to Acciona Trasmediterránea and sailed on the Almeria to Nador route as M/F Sherbatskiy. The ship was renamed Sher for her last voyage to the scrapyard at Alang, India and broken up in late 2015.

== Sister ships ==
- Spirit of Free Enterprise (1979) - Pride of Kent (1987) - MS Anthi Marina (2006) - scrapped: September 2012.
- Herald of Free Enterprise (1979) - capsized 6 March 1987 in Zeebrugge harbour - re-floated, renamed to Flushing Range for the final trip to the scrapyard. Scrapped: 1988
