= MS Free Enterprise I =

Roll-on roll-off ferry

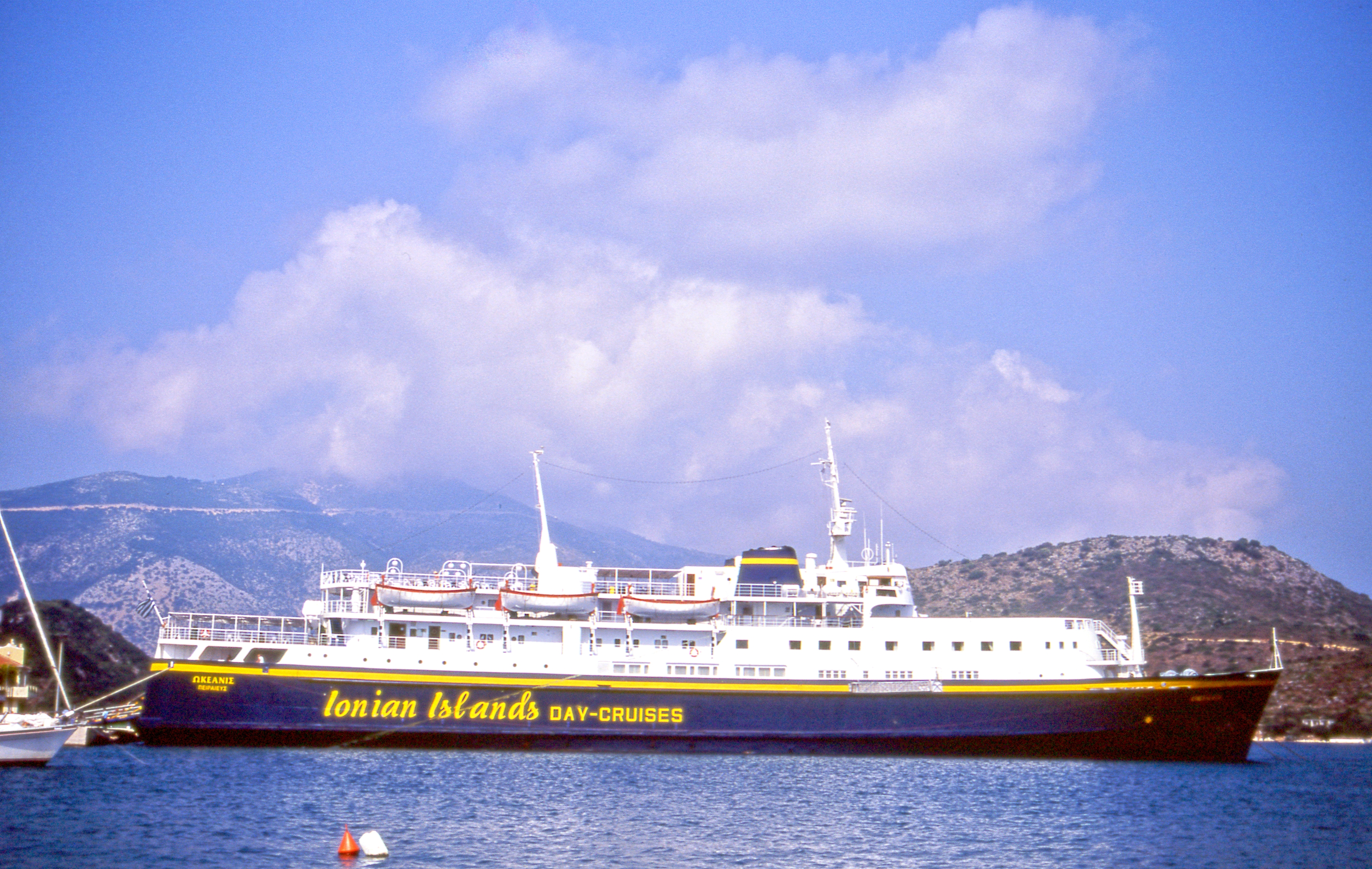

History

United Kingdom/Greece
- Name: Free Enterprise; Free Enterprise I (from May 1965); 1980: Kimolos; 1993: Ergina; 1995: Ventouris; 1995: Methodia II; 1997: Kallisti; 2005: Okeanis
- Owner: Townsend European Ferries; 1968: European Ferries; 1980: Ventouris Ferries; 1997: Sinderella NE, Piraeus; 2005: Ionian Lines Cruises & Ferry, Athens
- Operator: 1968: Townsend Thoresen
- Port of registry: 1962-1980: Dover; 1980-2007: Piraeus
- Route: 1962-79: Channel ferry; 1980-2007: Greek islands
- Builder: I.C.H. Holland, Netherlands
- Yard number: 424
- Laid down: 7 August 1961
- Launched: 2 February 1962
- Completed: April 1962
- Maiden voyage: 22 April 1962
- Identification: IMO number: 5120752; Callsign: GIAR
- Fate: Scrapped (2013)

General characteristics
- Type: Car and passenger ferry
- Tonnage: 3,881 GT; 450 DWT
- Length: 96.47 m (316.5 ft)
- Beam: 16.39 m (53.8 ft)
- Draught: 4.08 m (13.4 ft)
- Installed power: 2x 12-cylinder Smit-MAN RBL 6612 4 stroke single acting diesels; 7360 kW
- Propulsion: twin-screw
- Speed: 18 kn (21 mph)
- Capacity: 850 (1962) / 1,400 (1981) passengers; 120 cars
- Crew: 56

MS Free Enterprise (I) was a cross-Channel ferry operated by Townsend Brothers and later Townsend Thoresen between 1962 and 1980. She was their first purpose built roll-on/roll-off passenger and vehicle ferry. She was sold to Greece in 1980, where she served until being sold for scrap in 2013.

== History ==
Free Enterprise was built in 1962 by I.C.H. Holland, Werf Gusto Yard, Schiedam, the Netherlands, for Townsend Brothers Ferries. She was their first purpose built roll-on/roll-off passenger and vehicle ferry and entered service in 1962 on the Dover - Calais route. On delivery of Free Enterprise II in May 1965, she was renamed Free Enterprise I. In 1968, the company became European Ferries, continuing to operate services as Townsend Thoresen and Free Enterprise I appeared briefly in the 1969 film classic The Italian Job, starring Michael Caine, Noël Coward and Benny Hill.

In February 1980, Free Enterprise I was sold to Ventouris Group as the Kimolos. She ran aground twice in 1983.

In 1993 she was registered to Hellenic Coastal Lines (Ventouris Sons Shipping) receiving the name Ergina. In 1995 she was briefly given the name Ventouris before re-entering service with Ventouris Lines as Methodia II.

In 1997 Methodia II was sold to Sinderella NE, Piraeus, and renamed Kallisti. Kallisti was laid up in Heraklion in 2003. In 2005, she was registered to Ionian Lines Cruises & Ferry. She served for two years before being laid up in 2007. She never returned to service and was sold for scrap in June 2013.

== Layout ==
Free Enterprise had lanes for 120 cars on two decks.

== Service ==
Free Enterprise operated on the Dover-Calais service until 1979. During 1975 and 1976 Free Enterprise I spent time on the Cairnryan - Larne route. From 1977 until sale, she was on stand-by duties and then laid up at Tilbury.

From 1981, Kimolos operated between Piraeus and the Cyclades Islands. After 1997, Kallisti was used during the summer on cruises between Crete and Santorini, and in winter between Lavrio-Tinos-Mykonos. In 2007, Okeanis was operating as a day cruise ship. Okeanis was laid up at the end of the 2007 season and never returned to service, despite plans to resume day cruises. She was sold for scrap in May 2013, being towed to the dismantling port of Aliaga on 1 June 2013.

== Film and Media ==
The ship features in the 1969 film The Italian Job, taking the criminal mob and their cars across the English Channel en route to Turin.
