= El Salam Maritime Transport =

Egyptian ferry operator on the Red Sea

El Salam Maritime Transport Co
- Industry: Shipping
- Headquarters: Cairo, Egypt
- Area served: Red Sea
- Services: Passenger transportation Freight transportation
- Website: www.elsalammaritime.com

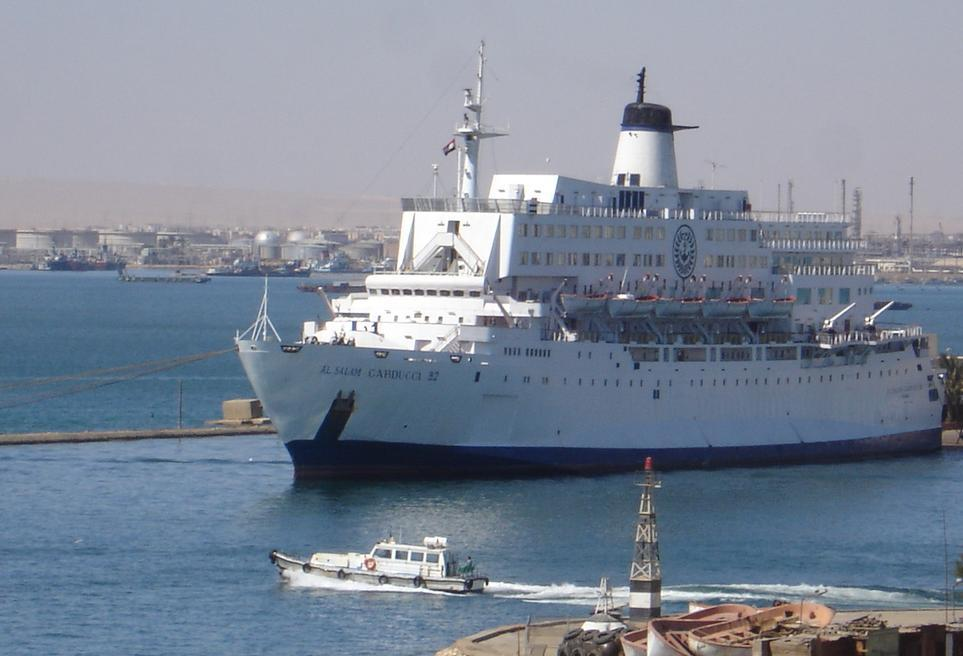
Al Salam Carducci 82 in Suez

El Salam Maritime Transport is an Egyptian ferry operator that operates a fleet of fifteen vessels on Red Sea routes between ports in Egypt, Saudi Arabia and Jordan. The company transports over one million passengers a year and is the largest private shipping company in the Middle East.

El Salam gained media attention in 2006 after the MV al-Salam Boccaccio 98 sank on 2 February 2006 in the Red Sea en route from Duba, Saudi Arabia, to Safaga in southern Egypt, with the loss of over 1000 lives.

This ship, among others in the same class, was supposed to end its career in 2010, but after the Boccaccio 98 disaster all three remaining vessels were sold to an Indian scrapyard (one other had burned out and sank in 2002).

== Routes operated ==
- Suez, Egypt – Jeddah, Saudi Arabia
- Safaga, Egypt – Duba and Jeddah, both in Saudi Arabia
- Nuweiba, Egypt – Aqaba, Jordan
- Hurghada, Egypt – Duba, Saudi Arabia
