= Herald of Free Enterprise =

Ferry sunk at Zeebrugge, Belgium in 1987

Coordinates: 51°22′28.5″N 3°11′26″E

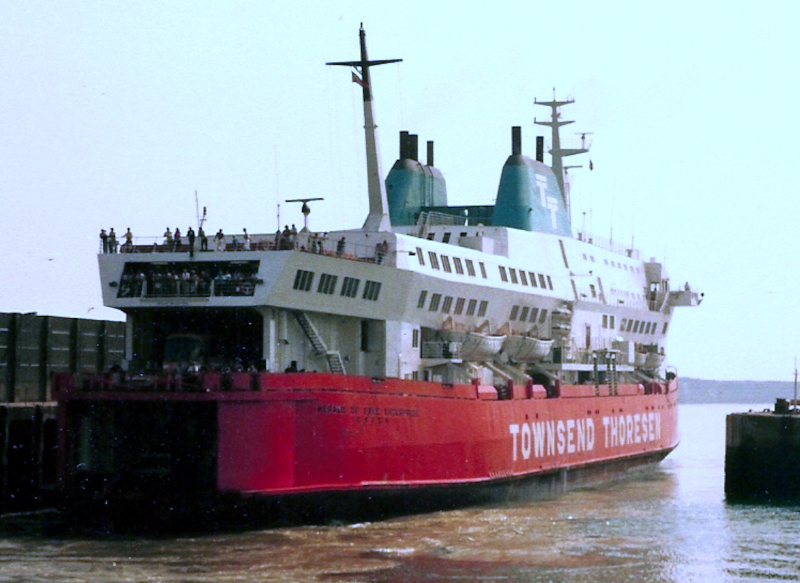
- Herald of Free Enterprise in Dover's Eastern Docks, 1984

History

United Kingdom
- Name: Herald of Free Enterprise (1980–1987); Flushing Range (1987–1988)
- Owner: Townsend Thoresen (1980–1987); Compania Naviera (1987–1988)
- Operator: Townsend Thoresen (1980–1987)
- Port of registry: Dover, England; Kingstown, Saint Vincent
- Builder: Schichau Unterweser, Bremerhaven, Germany
- Launched: 21 December 1979
- In service: 1980
- Out of service: 1987
- Identification: IMO number: 7820485
- Fate: Capsized 6 March 1987; Raised 24 April 1987; Scrapped 22 March 1988

General characteristics
- Class & type: Roll-on/roll-off car and passenger ferry
- Tonnage: 7951.44 gt; 3439.05 net tonnage
- Length: 131.91 m (432 ft 9 in)
- Beam: 23.19 m (76 ft 1 in)
- Draught: 5.72 m (18 ft 9 in)
- Installed power: 23,967 bhp (17,872 kW)
- Propulsion: 3 × Sulzer 12ZV 40/48 diesel engine
- Speed: 22 kn (41 km/h)
- Capacity: 1,400

Herald of Free Enterprise was a roll-on/roll-off ferry which capsized moments after leaving Zeebrugge, Belgium on the night of 6 March 1987, killing 193 passengers and crew.

The eight-deck car and passenger ferry was owned by Townsend Thoresen, designed for rapid loading and unloading on the competitive cross-channel route between Dover and Calais. As is common with RORO ferries, it was built with watertight compartments terminating below the vehicle deck, with the doors at the end of the vehicle deck becoming vital to avoiding uncontrolled flooding. The ship left harbour with her bow door open, and the sea immediately flooded the vehicle deck; within minutes, she was lying on her side in shallow water. The immediate cause of the capsizing was found to be negligence by the assistant boatswain, who was asleep in his cabin when he should have been closing the bow door. The official inquiry, however, placed more blame on his supervisors and a general culture of poor communication in Townsend Thoresen. The vessel was salvaged, put up for sale, and sold to Naviera SA Kingstown on 30 September 1987, renamed Flushing Range. It was taken to Taiwan on 22 March 1988 to be scrapped.

Since the disaster, improvements have been made to the design of RORO vessels, with watertight ramps, indicators showing the position of the bow doors, and the banning of undivided decks.

== Design and construction ==
In the late 1970s, Townsend Thoresen commissioned the design and construction of three new identical ships for its Dover–Calais route for delivery from 1980. The ships were branded the Spirit-class, and were named: Spirit of Free Enterprise, Herald of Free Enterprise and Pride of Free Enterprise. The name "Free Enterprise" dates from Townsend Car Ferries' pioneering private sector roll-on/roll-off ferries (including Free Enterprise I) introduced in 1962. Herald of Free Enterprise began active service on 29 May 1980.

To remain competitive with other ferry operators on the route, Townsend Thoresen required ships designed to permit fast loading and unloading and quick acceleration. The ships comprised eight decks numbered A to H from top to bottom, which contained the following:

- A-deck: crew accommodation and radio room
- Half deck (between A and B decks) wheelhouse (bridge)
- B-deck: passenger areas, crew accommodation and galley
- C-deck: passenger areas and galley
- D-deck: suspended vehicle deck within E deck
- E-deck: upper vehicle deck
- F-deck: crew accommodation (port and starboard)
- G-deck: main vehicle deck
- H-deck: engine rooms, stores and passenger accommodation at the forward end.

Loading of vehicles onto G deck was through watertight doors at the bow and stern. The wheelhouse was positioned at the forward end, and the ship had clam shell doors rather than raising a visor door, making it difficult to see the bow doors. Loading of vehicles onto E deck and D deck was through a weathertight door at the bow and an open portal at the stern. Vehicles could be loaded and unloaded onto E and G decks simultaneously, using double-deck linkspans at Dover and Calais.

The ships were constructed by Schichau Seebeckwerft in Bremerhaven, Germany. Propulsive power was by means of three 6,000 kW (8,000 bhp) 12-cylinder Sulzer medium-speed diesel engines driving variable-pitch propellers. The vehicle deck bow doors were constructed by Cargospeed, Glasgow, Scotland.

== Accident of 6 March 1987 ==
=== Background ===
On the day the ferry capsized, Herald of Free Enterprise was working the route between Dover and Zeebrugge. This was not her normal route and the linkspan at Zeebrugge had not been designed specifically for the Spirit-class vessels: it used a single deck, preventing the simultaneous loading of both E and G decks, and the ramp could not be raised high enough to reach E deck. To compensate for this, the vessel's bow ballast tanks were filled. The ship's natural trim was not restored after loading. Had Herald of Free Enterprise survived, she would have been modified to remove the need for this procedure.

It was normal practice for the assistant boatswain to close the doors before moorings were dropped. The assistant boatswain, Mark Stanley, however, had returned to his cabin for a short break after cleaning the car deck upon arrival, and was still asleep when the harbour-stations call sounded and the ship dropped her moorings. The first officer, Leslie Sabel, was required to stay on deck to make sure the doors were closed. Sabel said he thought he saw Stanley approaching. He was seriously injured in the disaster and the court concluded that his evidence was inaccurate. It is believed that, under pressure to get to his harbour station on the bridge, he had left G deck with the bow doors open in the expectation that Stanley would arrive shortly.

The court also described the attitude of boatswain Terence Ayling, believed to have been the last person on G deck. Asked why he did not close the doors given there was no one else there to do it, he said it was not his duty. The court nevertheless praised his work in the rescue.

Captain David Lewry assumed that the doors had been closed. He could not see them from the wheelhouse owing to the ship's design, and had no indicator lights in the wheelhouse to tell him otherwise.

=== Capsizing ===
The ship on her side, half-submerged

The ship left her berth in Zeebrugge inner harbour at 18:05 (GMT) with a crew of 80 and carrying 459 passengers, 81 cars, three buses and 47 trucks. She passed the outer mole at 18:24 (GMT) and capsized about four minutes later. When the ferry reached 18.9 knots (35.0 km/h) 90 seconds after leaving the harbour, water began to enter the car deck in large quantities. The resulting free surface effect destroyed her stability. In a matter of seconds, the ship began to list 30 degrees to port. The ship briefly righted herself before listing to port once more, this time capsizing. The entire event took place within 90 seconds. The water quickly reached the ship's electrical systems, destroying both main and emergency power and leaving the ship in darkness. The ship ended up on her side half-submerged in shallow water one kilometre (1/2 nautical mile) from the shore. Only a fortuitous turn to starboard in her last moments, and then capsizing on a sandbar, prevented the ship from sinking entirely in much deeper water.

Crew aboard a nearby dredger noticed Herald of Free Enterprise's lights disappear, and notified the port authorities. They also reported that the bow doors appeared to be wide open. The alarm was raised at 18:37 (GMT). Rescue helicopters were quickly dispatched, shortly followed by assistance from the Belgian Navy, which was undertaking an exercise in the area. Wolfgang Schröder, the German captain of a nearby ferry (M/V Gabriele Wehr), was commended by Prime Minister Margaret Thatcher and received a medal from King Baudouin of Belgium for his heroic efforts in rescuing passengers.

The disaster resulted in the deaths of 193 people. Many of those on board had taken advantage of a promotion in The Sun newspaper offering cheap trips to the continent. Most of the victims were trapped inside the ship and succumbed to hypothermia because of the frigid water. The rescue efforts of the Belgian Navy and Royal Navy divers limited the death toll. Recoverable bodies were removed in the days following the accident. During the rescue the tide started to rise and the rescue team was forced to stop all efforts until morning. The last of the people left on board died of hypothermia.

=== Investigation and inquiry ===
A public Formal Investigation into the incident was held in London in the following months, under Justice Barry Sheen as wreck commissioner. It found the capsizing was caused by three main factors—Stanley's failure to close the bow doors, Sabel's failure to make sure the bow doors were closed, and Lewry leaving port without knowing whether the bow doors were closed. While the court determined the immediate cause of the capsizing was Stanley's failure to close the bow doors, it was very critical of Sabel for not being in a position to prevent the disaster, calling his actions "the most immediate" cause of the capsizing.

The fact that Stanley was asleep at the time of departure led Sheen to examine the working practices of Townsend Thoresen, from which he concluded that the poor workplace communication and stand-off relationship between ship operators and shore-based managers was the root cause of the capsizing, and identified a "disease of sloppiness" and negligence at every level of the corporation's hierarchy. Issues relating to the breaking of waves high on the bow doors while under way and requests to have an indicator installed on the bridge showing the position of the doors were dismissed; the former because of the attitude that ships' masters would come and "bang on the desk" if an issue was truly important, and the latter because it was thought frivolous to spend money on equipment to indicate if employees had failed to do their job correctly.

The design of Herald of Free Enterprise was also found to be a contributory cause of the capsizing. Unlike other ships, which are subdivided into watertight compartments, the vehicle decks of RORO vessels are normally contiguous: any flooding on these decks would allow the water to flow the entire length of the ship. This issue had been identified as early as 1980, following the losses of Seaspeed Dora and Hero in June and November 1977, respectively. The need to adjust the ship's bow trim to use the port facilities at Zeebrugge and failure to readjust before departure was another factor in the capsizing.

In October 1983, Herald of Free Enterprise's sister ship Pride of Free Enterprise had sailed from Dover to Zeebrugge with the bow doors open, after her assistant boatswain fell asleep. It was therefore believed that leaving the bow doors open alone should not have caused the ship to capsize. Tests by the Danish Maritime Institute after the accident, however, found that once water began to enter the vehicle deck of a RORO, it was likely that the vessel would capsize within 30 minutes, while other tests showed that the lack of watertight subdivision (which was common on other vessels) allowed the weight of water to flow freely and increase the likelihood of capsizing.

Another factor that contributed to the capsizing was the squat effect. When a vessel is under way, the movement under it creates low pressure, which has the effect of increasing the vessel's draught. In deep water the effect is small but in shallow water it is greater, because as the water that passes underneath the vessel moves faster it causes the draught to increase. This reduced the clearance between the bow doors and water line to between 1.5 and 1.9 metres (4 ft 11 in and 6 ft 3 in). After extensive tests, the investigators found that when the ship travelled at a speed of 18 knots (21 mph; 33 km/h), the wave was enough to engulf the bow doors. This caused a "step change": if the ship had been sailing at less than 18 knots and not in shallow water, people on the car deck would probably have had time to notice the bow doors were open and close them.

== Inquest ==
In October 1987, a coroner's inquest jury into the capsizing returned 187 verdicts of unlawful killing. Seven people involved at the company were charged with gross negligence manslaughter, and the operating company, P&O European Ferries (Dover) Ltd, was charged with corporate manslaughter, but the case collapsed after Justice Turner directed the jury to acquit the company and the five most senior individual defendants. This was because the various acts of negligence could not be attributed to any individual who was a so-called "controlling mind". It did, however, set a precedent that corporate manslaughter is an offence known to the law of England and Wales. The disaster was one of a number that influenced thinking leading to the Public Interest Disclosure Act 1998.

== Aftermath ==
=== Immediate ===
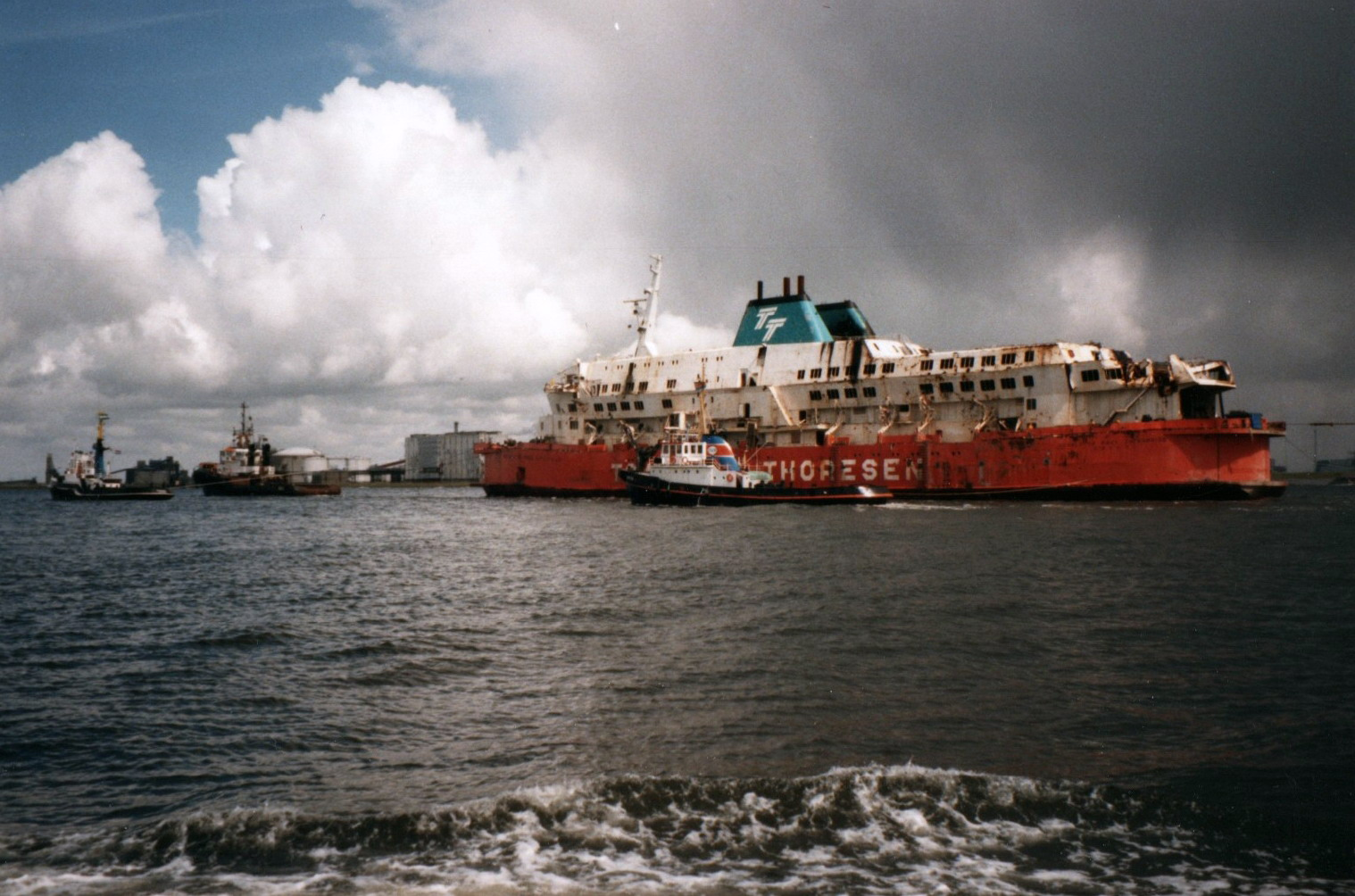
MS Herald of Free Enterprise towed into the harbour at Vlissingen after salvage, May 1987

A salvage operation, conducted by Dutch company Smit-Tak Towage and Salvage (part of Smit International), was embarked upon almost immediately to refloat the ship. The operation included parbuckling and was successfully concluded in late April 1987, allowing the remaining bodies trapped underwater to be removed. The ship was towed to Zeebrugge, and then across the Western Scheldt to the yard of De Schelde in Vlissingen (Flushing, Netherlands), where her fate was decided.

It had originally been assumed that she could be repaired and continue sailing. No buyer was found, however; she was sold to Compania Naviera SA of Kingstown, Saint Vincent and the Grenadines, for scrapping. She was renamed Flushing Range and the Townsend Thoresen branding painted over before her final sailing to a scrapyard at Kaohsiung, Taiwan. She began her final voyage on 5 October 1987, together with Gaelic, towed by the Dutch tug Markusturm. The voyage was interrupted for four days when the ships encountered the Great Storm of 1987 off Cape Finisterre, where Herald of Free Enterprise was cast adrift after its tow rope parted, resuming on 19 October 1987.

The hull began to disintegrate while off the coast of South Africa on 27 December 1987, and had to be towed into Port Elizabeth on 2 January 1988 to undergo temporary repairs to allow her to continue her voyage. She finally arrived in Taiwan on 22 March 1988.

P&O, who had only just taken over Townsend Thoresen before the disaster, quickly decided to re-brand the company as P&O European Ferries, repaint the fleet's red hulls in navy blue and remove the TT logo from the funnels.

=== Long-term ===
The capsizing of Herald of Free Enterprise caused the highest death count of any peacetime maritime disaster involving a British ship since the sinking of HMY Iolaire on 1 January 1919 near Stornoway, Isle of Lewis, when at least 205 perished of the 280 aboard.

Since the accident, several improvements to the design of this type of vessel have been made. These include indicators on the bridge that display the state of the bow doors, watertight ramps being fitted to the bow sections of the front of the ship, and "freeing flaps" to allow water to escape from a vehicle deck in the event of flooding. The International Convention for the Safety of Life at Sea regulations were changed in 1990 to require 125 centimetres (49 in) of freeboard (in the case of RORO vessels, defined as the height between the vehicle deck and the water line) for all new ROROs, instead of the previous 76 centimetres (30 in). Some vessels omit the bow door configuration altogether and vehicles enter and exit from rear doors only. New International Maritime Organization (IMO) regulations are in place that prohibit an open (undivided) deck of this length on a passenger RORO vessel. The capsizing of the ship is used as a standard example of the free surface effect in manuals of seamanship dealing with stability.

Both of Herald of Free Enterprise's two sister ships have since been withdrawn from service. The former Spirit of Free Enterprise was extended to increase her cargo capacity during her time under the P&O flag in a stretch and total rebuild operation and scrapped in 2012. Pride of Free Enterprise remained more or less as built, being scrapped in 2015.

In the UK, an ensemble group named Ferry Aid released a charity record of the song "Let It Be" by the Beatles.

Nicholas Ridley, a government minister at the time, was criticised for alluding to the accident (while speaking on another subject) on 10 March 1987. He was quoted as saying that "although he is the pilot of the [parliamentary] Bill, he has not got his bow doors open". He apologised for the remark.

The disaster was the subject of an episode from Series 2 of Seconds From Disaster. The disaster was also featured in an episode of Deadly Engineering (Season 1, Episode 5) on the Science Channel.

On 1 July 2014, The History Press released a book called Ninety Seconds at Zeebrugge: The Herald of Free Enterprise Story (ISBN 9780752497839), telling the story of the disaster and its aftermath. A second edition, updated to reflect the thirtieth anniversary, was released on 1 March 2018 (ISBN 978-0750985819).

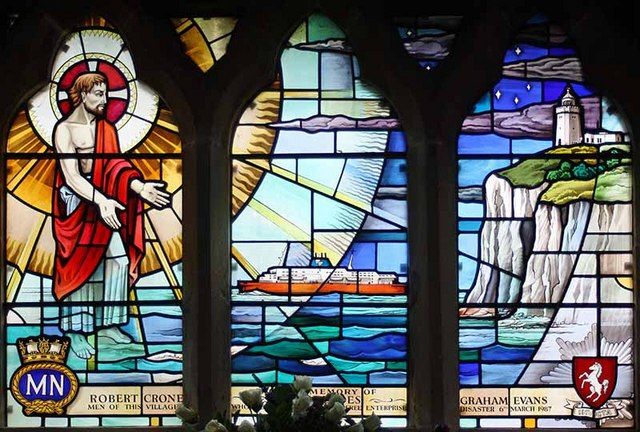
Memorial window at St Margaret's Church, St Margaret's at Cliffe, Kent

St Mary's Church, Dover houses a permanent memorial to the disaster. In the village church of St Margaret, St Margaret's at Cliffe, there is a stained-glass window dedicated to Bob Crone, Bryan Eades and Graham Evans, three of the crewmen who died during the disaster.

=== Disaster Action ===
Australian businessman Maurice de Rohan, who lost his daughter and son-in-law in the tragedy, founded Disaster Action, a charity which assists people affected by similar events.

=== Gallantry awards ===
The following British awards for gallantry on the night of the capsizing were gazetted on 30 December 1987, alongside the 1988 New Year Honours:

- Herald of Free Enterprise crew
  - Michael Ian Skippen, Head Waiter, George Medal (posthumous)
  - Leigh Cornelius, Seaman, Queen's Gallantry Medal
  - Stephen Robert Homewood, Assistant Purser, Queen's Gallantry Medal
  - William Sean Walker, Seaman, Queen's Gallantry Medal
  - Thomas Hume Wilson, Quartermaster, Queen's Gallantry Medal
- Herald of Free Enterprise passenger
  - Andrew Clifford Parker, Assistant Bank Manager, Nippon Credit International, George Medal
- Belgian Navy
  - Lieutenant-Ter-Zee 1ste Klas Guido A. Couwenbergh, Queen's Gallantry Medal
  - Lieutenant-Ter-Zee 1ste Klas Alfons M. A. C. Daems, Queen's Gallantry Medal
- Royal Navy
  - Lieutenant Simon Nicholas Bound, Queen's Gallantry Medal
  - Able Seaman Eamon Christopher McKinley Fullen, Queen's Gallantry Medal
  - Chief Petty Officer Edward Gene Kerr, Queen's Commendation for Brave Conduct
  - Chief Petty Officer Peter Frank Still, Queen's Commendation for Brave Conduct
- Tijdelijke Vereniging Bergingswerken
  - Piet Lagast, Diver, Queen's Gallantry Medal
  - Dirk van Mullem, Diver, Queen's Gallantry Medal

== See also ==
- MS Estonia, a ferry lost in 1994 due to bow door failure
- List of maritime disasters
- List of roll-on/roll-off vessel accidents
- List of disasters in Great Britain and Ireland by death toll
- MV Tricolor, an automobile cargo ship which sank nearby in 2002
- Why–because analysis
