= Speedlink Vanguard =

Train ferry (1973)

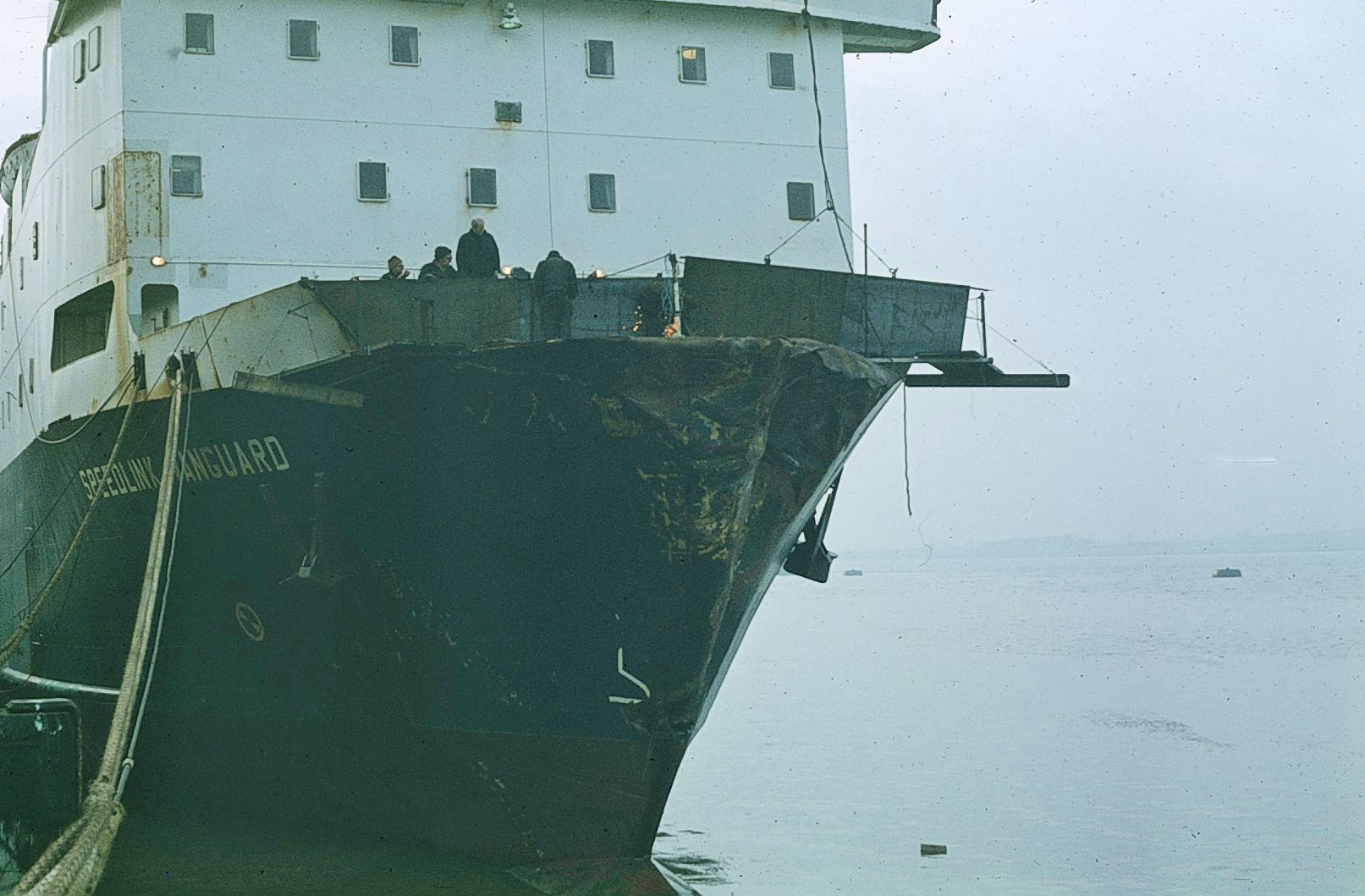
- Speedlink Vanguard in Harwich, 1982

History
- Name: Stena Shipper (1973); Union Wellington (1973–1976); Alpha Express (1976–1980); Stena Shipper (1980–1981); Speedlink Vanguard (1981–1987); Caribe Express (1987–1988); Stena Shipper (1988); Kirk Shipper (1988–1989); Normandie Shipper (1989–1999); Bonavista (1999–2001); Boa Vista (2001–2007); Birlik 1 (2007–2013)
- Owner: Stena Line (1973–1980); Stena Cargo Line (1980–1988); Northern Marine Ltd (1988); Stena Ferries Ltd (1988–1999); Adecon Shipping Ltd (1999–2001); Kyst-Link A/S (2001–2003); Trond A Kittelson Shipping (2003–2004); Kittilssen Shipping (2004–2007); Thrace Shipping (2007); Birlik RoRo Isletmeleri AS (2007–2013)
- Operator: Chartered to — Stena Line (1973); Union Steamship Co (1973–1975); Arghiris Line (1976–1979); Sealink UK Ltd (1980–1987); Truck Line Ferries (1989–1992); HUAL (2007)
- Port of registry: Sweden (1973); New Zealand (1973– ); West Germany (1977); Greece (1977–1980); Bermuda (1980– ); Cayman Islands (1988–1989); (The Bahamas) Nassau, Bahamas (1989–2004); Panama (2004–2007); Turkey (2008–2013)
- Route: see text
- Builder: A Vuyk & Zonen's Scheepswerven
- Yard number: 864
- Launched: 16 June 1973
- In service: 24 September 1973
- Out of service: May 2013
- Identification: IMO number: 7325241
- Fate: Scrapped 1 June 2013

General characteristics
- Type: Ferry (1973–1981); Train ferry (1981–1987); Ferry (1987–2013)
- Tonnage: 2,638 GRT, 798 NRT, 3,816 DWT (1973–1981); 3,514 GRT, 1,296 NRT, 5,555 DWT (1981–1989); 8,104 GT, 5,555 DWT (1989–2013)
- Length: 115.32 metres (378 ft 4 in) (1973–1976); 142.27 metres (466 ft 9 in) (1976–2013)
- Beam: 16.37 metres (53 ft 8 in) (1973–1981); 18.60 metres (61 ft 0 in) (1981–2013)
- Draught: 4.50 metres (14 ft 9 in) (1973–1981); 5.90 metres (19 ft 4 in) (1981–2013)
- Installed power: 2 × 6cyl Stork Werkspoor 6TM410 diesel engines 5,296 kilowatts (7,102 hp)
- Speed: 18 knots (33 km/h)
- Capacity: 12 passengers (1973–1981); 36 passengers (1981–2013); 56 railway wagons (Speedlink Vanguard)
- Crew: 28 (Speedlink Vanguard)

Speedlink Vanguard was a 3,514 GRT train ferry which was built in 1973 as Stena Shipper. She was charted to a New Zealand operator on completion and renamed Union Wellington and saw further service as Alpha Express and Stena Shipper before entering service with Sealink as Speedlink Vanguard. The ship was involved in a collision with European Gateway in 1982, which sank the latter ship with the loss of six lives.

She saw further service under the names Caribe Express, Stena Shipper, Kirk Shipper, Normandie Shipper Bonavista, Boa Vista and Birlik 1 before being scrapped in 2013. The ship sailed under the flags of the Bahamas, Bermuda, the Cayman Islands, Greece, New Zealand, Panama, Sweden, Turkey and West Germany at various points in her career.

== Description ==
As built, the ship was 115.32 metres (378 ft 4 in) long, with a beam of 16.37 metres (53 ft 8 in) and a draught of 4.50 metres (14 ft 9 in). She was powered by two Werkspoor 6TM401 diesel engines giving a total of 5,296 kilowatts (7,102 hp). These could propel the ship at 18 knots (33 km/h). She was assessed at 2,638 GRT, 798 NRT, 3,816 DWT. The ship had a capacity of 12 passengers.

Following her 1981 rebuild, the ship was 142.27 metres (466 ft 9 in) long, with a beam of 18.60 metres (61 ft 0 in) and a draught of 5.60 metres (18 ft 4 in). She was assessed at 3,514 GRT, 1,296 NRT, 5,555 DWT. The ship had a capacity of 36 passengers.

== History ==
Stena Shipper was built in 1973 by A. Vuyk & Zonen's Scheepswerven, Capelle aan den IJssel, Netherlands as Yard Number 864. Launched on 16 June 1973 and completed in September, she was allocated the IMO Number 7325241.

On completion, Stena Shipper was chartered to the Union Steam Ship Company of New Zealand and transferred to the New Zealand flag. She was renamed Union Wellington on 2 November 1973. The charter ended in 1975 and she returned to Europe. In 1976, she was lengthened by about 37 metres (121 ft) by Howaldtswerke-Deutsche Werft, Kiel, West Germany. She was reflagged to West Germany on 26 January 1977 during tests after her rebuilt and was then reflagged to Greece the next day. She was chartered to Aghiris Lines, Piraeus and renamed Alpha Express. Following the bankruptcy of Aghiris Lines in 1979, she was arrested at Mombasa, Kenya.

In May 1981, Alpha Express was sent to Smith's Dock, Middlesbrough, Tyne & Wear for conversion to a train ferry. In August she was chartered to Sealink and renamed Speedlink Vanguard. She had a capacity of 56 railway wagons. Speedlink Vanguard entered service on the Harwich–Zeebrugge route on 21 August. This allowed Suffolk Ferry to be withdrawn from service and Norfolk Ferry to be placed in reserve. On 19 December 1982, Speedlink Vanguard collided with European Gateway off Harwich, tearing a 70-metre-long (230 ft) gash in European Gateway's hull and causing her to capsize in the shallow water with the loss of six of the 70 people on board. Between 40 and 50 survivors were rescued by Dana Futura with small boats rescuing the remainder. There were no injuries amongst the 28 crew on Speedlink Vanguard. Speedlink Vanguard re-entered service ten days later following repairs. The charter to Sealink ended on 30 January 1987. Following a Court of Inquiry, the captains of both vessels were blamed for the collision. An inquest recorded an open verdict on all six victims of the accident after the jury were unable to agree on a verdicts of accident, or misadventure. On 6 January 1987, Speedlink Vanguard lost engine power and steering in a Force 8 gale in the North Sea and issued a Mayday. Power was later restored and she arrived safely at Harwich.

The ship was renamed Caribe Express in 1987 and then Stena Shipper and Kirk Shipper in 1988. She was transferred to Northern Marine Inc., Cayman Islands in 1988 and then to Stena Ferries Ltd, Cayman Islands later that year. Between April and June 1989 the ship was rebuilt at Lloyd Werft, Bremerhaven, West Germany, following which she was chartered to Truckline Ferries, Caen, France and renamed Normandie Shipper. She was reflagged to the Bahamas with Nassau as her port of registry. She served on the Caen–Portsmouth and Cherbourg–Poole routes. Following amendments to the SOLAS Convention in 1990, Normandie Shipper was listed by the British Department of Transport as one of the ships needing modifications to fully meet the new SOLAS 90 standard. Following the end of the charter, she was laid up at Caen in October 1995.

She was then sold to Adecon Shipping Ltd, Bahamas and renamed Bonavista. Rebuilt in Świnoujście, Poland in April 2000 for a planned charter to Falcon Seafreight, Bonavista was then laid up at Świnoujście until July 2001 when she was sold to Kyst-Link A/S, Nassau and renamed Boa Vista. She operated the Brevik–Holmestrand–Hirtshals route for a year before transferring to the Hirtshals–Langesund route. On 26 March 2003, Boa Vista collided with the breakwater at Hirtshals. Two days later, she was sold to Trond A Kittelsen Shipping, A/S, Brevik, remaining on the Hirtshals–Langesund route.

On 16 June 2004, Boa Vista was sold to Kittilsen Shipping, Panama. She was chartered to HUAL. She was operated by Thraki Med RoRo Lines on the Volos–İzmir route from September 2006. On 3 November 2007, Boa Vista was sold to Thraki Shipping Co SA, Panama and renamed Birlik 1. She was registered to Birlik RoRo Isletmeleri AS, Istanbul, Turkey in December 2007. She was used on the Zonguldak–Skadovsk route. Boa Vista arrived at Aliağa, Turkey for scrapping on 1 June 2013.
