= European Ferries =

Former shipping company

European Ferries Group plc
- Predecessor: Townsend Car Ferries (1959); Thoresen Car Ferries (1968); Atlantic Steam Navigation Company (1971); Larne Harbour (1973); Felixstowe Dock & Railway Company (1976)
- Founded: 1935
- Defunct: 1987
- Successor: P&O European Ferries
- Headquarters: Dover, England
- Area served: England, France, Belgium, Scotland, Northern Ireland
- Key people: Peter Ford (Executive Chairman)
- Services: Passenger transportation, Freight transportation, Harbour Operation, Property
- Operating income: £45.5 million (1985)
- Divisions: Shipping; Harbour Operations; Overseas Property

European Ferries Group plc was a company that operated in passenger and freight ferries, harbour operation and property management in the United Kingdom and the United States. It was taken over by P&O and renamed P&O European Ferries in 1987.

== History ==
The European Ferries Group was incorporated in 1935 as Monument Securities Limited, becoming a public limited company in 1949.

In 1957, Monument Securities bought a 51% stake in Townsend Car Ferries and in 1959 acquired the remaining shares. The same year Monument Securities changed its name to George Nott Industries Limited.

== Townsend Thoresen ==
Townsend Thoresen
- Founded: 1968
- Defunct: 1987
- Successor: P&O European Ferries
- Headquarters: Dover, England
- Area served: United Kingdom, France, Belgium, Northern Ireland
- Services: Passenger transportation, Freight transportation

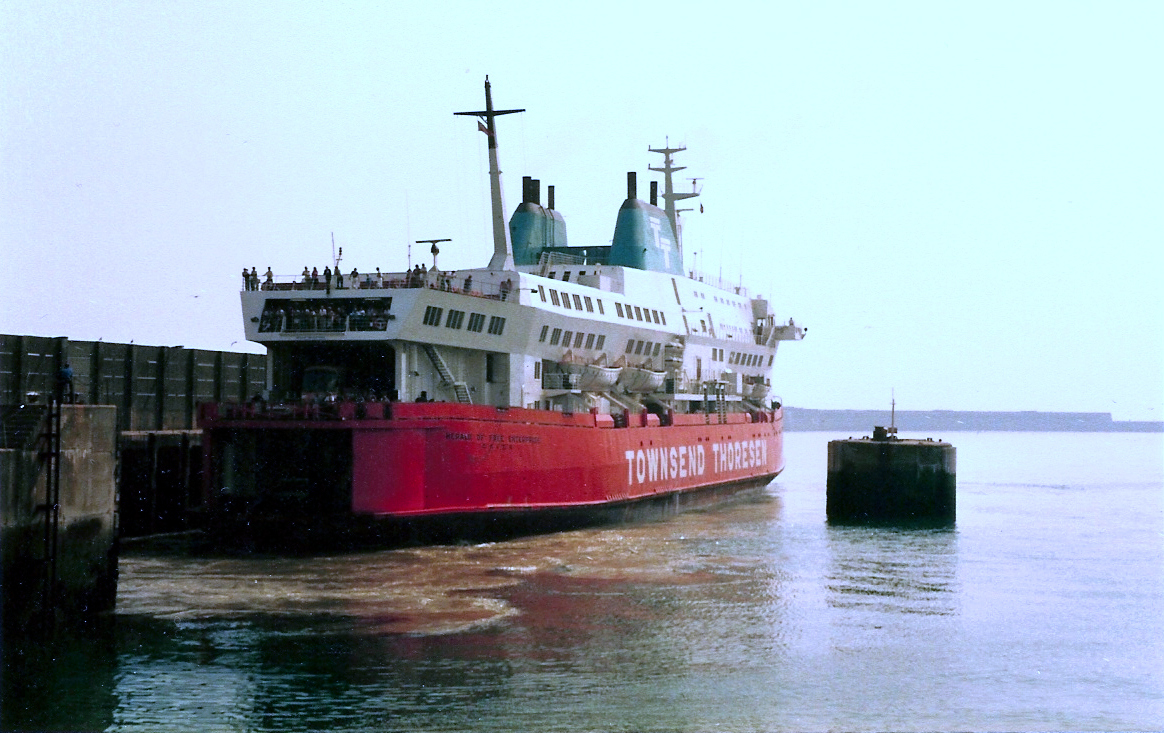
Herald of Free Enterprise in Dover's Eastern Docks, 1984

In 1968, George Nott Industries purchased the Otto Thoresen Shipping Company and its subsidiary Thoresen Car Ferries. As a result of this acquisition it changed its name to European Ferries Limited. In 1971 the Atlantic Steam Navigation Company Limited (trading as Transport Ferry Service) was acquired from the National Freight Corporation. All three of the companies under European Ferries used the name Townsend Thoresen to market their ferry services.

In 1973, European Ferries purchased Larne Harbour Limited and a 50% stake in the former naval dockyard at Harwich. This was followed in 1976 with the acquisition of The Felixstowe Dock and Railway Company.

In 1979, European Ferries entered the property industry in a joint venture for property development in Denver, it expanded this in Atlanta and in 1980 began buying further land in Houston. It had acquired around 5,000 acres (20 km^{2}) of land.

In May 1984, European Ferries Limited transferred its assets to European Ferries Group plc and in January 1985 European Ferries made a further acquisition, when P&O decided to divest its ferry business and sold its operations between Dover and Boulogne and Southampton and Le Havre. These services were formerly known as Normandy Ferries.

On 6 March 1987, the Townsend Thoresen branded roll on/roll off car ferry Herald of Free Enterprise capsized just outside Zeebrugge's harbour about 25 minutes after departure. A subsequent inquiry determined that the ship's bow doors had been left open allowing water to get onto the car deck with 193 deaths as a result of the sinking.

At the time of the sinking, the operating company, P&O European Ferries (Dover) Limited were rebranding the Townsend Thoresen ferries. This was expedited rapidly due to the negative publicity that the disaster had caused to the Townsend Thoresen brand.

=== Felixstowe Dock and Railway Company ===
In 1976, European Ferries took over the operations of Port of Felixstowe following the purchase of the Felixstowe Dock and Railway Company. Townsend Thoresen had begun a twice daily service from Felixstowe to Zeebrugge in 1974. By 1978, European Ferries had purpose built a passenger and freight terminal from which its subsidiary Townsend Thoresen could operate.

Under the management of European Ferries, Felixstowe increased its container handling capacity to approximately 500,000 per annum and in 1980 a total of 252,802 containers were handled, making it the United Kingdom's largest container port. In 1984, Felixstowe became the first UK seaport to introduce computerised Customs clearance.

The management of the port was continued by P&O upon the acquisition of European Ferries in 1987.

In 1991 the Port of Felixstowe was sold to Hutchison Whampoa.

=== Larne Harbour Limited ===
In 1973, European Ferries took over the operations of Port of Larne, Northern Ireland, following the purchase of Larne Harbour Limited. Under European Ferries management the Port prospered, making it the leading ro/ro port in Northern Ireland. European Ferries have improved the handling facilities for ro/ro operations with new double deck facilities in 1978. and a new passenger terminal in 1985.

== Property management ==
European Ferries Group had a number of subsidiaries in the property management and development industry. These were managed by subsidiaries EF International Inc in the United States, Inmogold SA in Spain and Townsend Thoresen Developments Limited and Townsend Thoresen Properties Limited in the United Kingdom.

In May 1985, European Ferries transferred the majority of its UK property interests to Stockley Plc in exchange for a 44% share and as a result of Stockley's acquisition of 26.5% Stock Conversion Plc this stake was reduced to 34.7%. European Ferries maintained a portfolio of around 15 to 20 properties in the UK and was also involved in a 1,100-acre (450-hectare) leisure development in Southern Spain and other properties in Hamburg and Frankfurt

== In the media ==
- In the 1969 original version of The Italian Job, the ferry used by the robbers to reach the continent was the Free Enterprise I (around 40 minutes into the film).
- In 1977, the Viking Valiant attended the Queen Elizabeth II Silver Jubilee Fleet Review in the Solent.
- Townsend Thoresen was the sponsor for the British Formula Ford 1600cc Championship in 1981, when future Formula One Grand Prix winner Ayrton Senna won the championship.

== Falklands War ==
In 1982, three vessels operated by European Ferries were requisitioned by the Ministry of Defence to assist with the Falklands Campaign. The three vessels were; Europic Ferry, Nordic Ferry and Baltic Ferry

- Baltic Ferry was equipped with a helipad and carried three Army helicopters, 105 troops, and 1874 tons of stores and ammunition to Ajax Bay on 1 June 1982.
- Europic Ferry was equipped with a helipad and carried vehicles, ammunition, fuel, and four Scout helicopters of 656 Squadron Army Air Corps to San Carlos on 21 May 1982. She left the Falkland Islands on 23 June 1982, 9 days after the end of hostilities.
- Nordic Ferry was equipped with a helipad and carried troops, stores, and ammunition to the Falklands on 29 May 1982. She returned to the UK on 29 July 1982 and was refitted to return her to civilian service on 25 August 1982.

Following the Falklands War, a number of lessons had been learnt by the British Government. In a bid to test their understanding of these lessons, the Ministry of Defence scheduled a military exercise named Exercise Purple Warrior in Scotland in November 1987. A number of vessels were chartered by the MoD, including European Ferries Viking Viscount. Prior to leaving for this charter the Viking Viscount was fitted with an extra ramp to enable unloading of vehicles to Mexeflotes. A number of military vehicles were embarked in Plymouth prior to the exercise beginning.
