= British Railways ships =

British Railways operated a number of ships from its formation in 1948 on a variety of routes. Many ships were acquired on nationalisation, and others were built for operation by British Railways or its later subsidiary, Sealink. Those ships capable of carrying rail vehicles were classed under TOPS as Class 99.

== Ships ==
| Ship | Launched | Tonnage (GRT) | TOPS number | Notes and references |
|---|---|---|---|---|
| Accrington | 1910 | 1,629 | - | Built in 1910 for the Great Central Railway. Passed to the London and North Eastern Railway (LNER) in 1923. Requisitioned during the Second World War for use as a convoy rescue ship. Returned to LNER post-war and passed to British Railways in 1948. Served until 1950 when scrapped. |
| Ailsa Princess | 1970 | 6,177 | - | Built in 1970 for British Transport Ship Management (Scotland) Ltd., London. In service for Sealink in 1971. Chartered by the Ministry of Defence in 1982-83 for trials as a minelayer. Renamed Earl Harold in 1985. Chartered to British and Irish Steam Packet Company in 1989 and reflagged to the Bahamas. Sold in 1989 to Aktoploiki Maritime, Piraeus, Greece and renamed Dimitra. Sold in 1984 to Agapitos Line, Piraeus and renamed Naias Express. Acquired in 2000 by Minoan Flying Dolphins and renamed Express Adonis. Transferred in 2005 to Hellenic Seaways, Piraeus and laid up pending sale. Sold in December 2005 to G Gupta, Rockford, Illinois, United States, renamed New Caribbean Princess in 2006 and reflagged to Panama. Towed in February 2006 to Drapetsona, Greece. Sold in April 2010 to Indian shipbreakers. Renamed New Cambay Prince for final journey. |
| Amsterdam | 1950 | 5,092 | - | Built in 1950 by John Brown & Company, Clydebank. Sold in 1969 to Chandris Line, converted to a cruise ship and renamed Fiorita. Laid up in 1978 and used from 1978 to 1980 as an accommodation ship. Renamed Ariane II in 1980 and laid up until 1983. Served as an accommodation ship at Fethiye, Turkey until she capsized and sank in a storm on 27 January 1987. |
| Anderida | 1972 | 1,479 | 99 008 | Train ferry built in 1972 by Trosvik Verksted, Brevik, Norway for Stena Line. Sold in 1972 to Carpass Shipping Co Ltd, London. Chartered by British Rail in August 1972 and served until December 1980, when laid up for seven months at Dover before re-entering service. Sold in October 1981 to Covenant Shipping Inc, Liberia. Reflagged to Greece and renamed Truck Trader. Laid up in Greece in September 1984. Sold three months later to South Pacific Navigation Ltd, Wellington, New Zealand and renamed Sealink. Renamed Mirela in 1986, laid up that October at Piraeus. Sold in December 1986 to Cooperative de Transport Maritime et Aérien, Cap-aux-Meules, Canada and renamed CTMA Voyager. In active service as of 2011. |
| Antrim Princess | 1967 | 3,630 | - | Built by Hawthorn Leslie in 1967 for service on the Stranraer – Larne route. Suffered a serious engine fire at sea in December 1983. All passengers airlifted off. Chartered to the Isle of Man Steam Packet Company in 1985 and renamed Tynwald in 1986. Returned to Sealink in February 1990 and laid up awaiting sale. Sold to Linee Lauro and renamed Lauro Express. Renamed Giuseppe D'Abundo in 2004. Chartered by Di Maio Group, Italy in June 2005. Sold for scrap in November 2006 and seized by the company she had been sold to in December 2006. Renamed Stella and reflagged to Saint Kitts and Nevis. Scrapped in 2007 at Alang, India. |
| Antwerp | 1920 | 2,957 | - | Launched in 1919 and built in 1920 for the Great Eastern Railway. Passed to London and North Eastern Railway in 1923 and acquired by British Railways in 1948. Served until scrapped in 1951. |
| Anu | 1972 | 1,577 | - | Built in 1972 by Ankerløkken Verft AS, Oslo, Norway for Alander Frachtschiff GmbH, Hamburg, West Germany. Chartered from May 1973 – June 1974 by North Sea Ferries and renamed Norcliff. Renamed Anu when charter ended. Sold in June 1980 to Tejo Leasing Ltd, Sark, Channel Islands. Chartered by Sealink from June – September 1980. Sold in September 1980 to Javelin Shipping Co, Jersey, Channel Islands and renamed Lune Bridge. Chartered by Sealink from October – December 1980. Renamed Lady Catherine in that month. Chartered from August 1981 – February 1982 by Span Lake Marine Inc, Oshawa, Ontario, Canada and renamed Lake Ontario Span. Chartered from February 1982 – 1985 by the British Ministry of Defence, commissioned into the Royal Fleet Auxiliary as RFA Sir Lamorak. Sold in January 1986 to Cenargo Navigation Ltd, Douglas, Isle of Man and renamed Merchant Trader. Sold in 1987 to Scout Shipping Ltd, Nassau, Bahamas and renamed Mols Trader, then registered to Bahamadifko LXII, Nassau, Bahamas and renamed Mads Mols. Chartered in 1989 to Mainland Market Deliveries, United Kingdom and renamed Pride of Portsmouth. Chartered in 1992 by Commodore Ferries Ltd, Guernsey and renamed Norman Commodore. Onboard fire on 11 December 1993. Damage not serious and the ship was repaired and returned to service. Sold in March 1994 to Clare Business Ltd, Nassau, Bahamas. Sold in December 1995 to Rederi AB Lillgaard, Mariehamn, Finland and renamed Fjärdvägen. In service as of 2011. |
| Arnhem | 1946 | 4,891 | - | Launched in 1946 and completed in 1947 for the LNER. Acquired by British Railways in 1948 and served until 1968. Scrapped at Inverkeithing in June 1969. |
| Autocarrier | 1931 | 822 | - | Built in 1931 by D & W Henderson & Co, Glasgow, for the Southern Railway. Requisitioned by the Royal Navy during the Second World War for use as a troopship and later a recreation ship. Returned to Southern Railway in 1945 and acquired by British Railways in 1948. Served until 1956 when scrapped at Ghent, Belgium. |
| Avalon | 1963 | 6,584 | - | Built in 1963 by Alexander Stephen & Sons, Glasgow. Served until 1980 when sold to Seafaith Navigation Co, Limassol, Cyprus and renamed Valon. Scrapped at Gadani Beach, Pakistan in January 1981. |
| Brading | 1948 | 988 | - | Built in 1948 by William Denny & Brothers. Participated in the 1953 Coronation Review. served until 1984 when sold to Sea Containers Ltd, Bermuda. Laid up at Portsmouth in 1986. Survey in 1992 found she was in a poor condition, planned refit did not take place and she was scrapped in 1994 by H G Pounds, Portsmouth. |
| Brian Boroime | 1970 | 4,098 | - | Built in 1970 by Verolme Cork Dockyard. Container ship built for British Rail Sealink container service between Holyhead and Belfast / Dublin |
| Brittany | 1933 | 1,445 | - | Built in 1933 by William Denny & Brothers for SR. Requisitioned by the Royal Navy in 1940 and returned to SR in 1945. Acquired by British Railways in 1948. Participated in the 1953 Commonwealth Fleet Review. Served until 1963 when sold to Rederi Ab Ålandsfärjan, Mariehamn, Finland and renamed Ålandsfärjan. Passed to Viking Line in 1966 and SF-Line Ab in 1970. Ran aground on 19 May 1972 at Söderarm. Declared a constructive total loss, scrapped in June 1972 at Helsingfors, Finland. |
| Brightlingsea | 1925 | 51 | - | Built in 1925 for the London and North Eastern Railway. Served as a passenger ferry between Harwich and Felixstowe. Passed in 1964 to Orwell & Harwich Navigation Co and then to the Felixstowe Dock & Railway Co in 1979. Sold to Harry Rodger in 1985 and served until 1996. In service as an excursion ship based at Harwich. |
| Brighton | 1949 | 2,875 | - | Ordered by the Southern Railway in 1947. Built by William Denny & Brothers in 1949. Sold to Jersey Lines in 1967 and renamed La Duchesse de Bretagne. Sold to Channel Island Services Ltd in 1969 and scrapped in 1970. |
| Brittany | 1933 | 1,520 | - | Built by William Denny & Brothers in 1933 for the Southern Railway. Acquired by British Railways in 1948. Sold in 1962 to the Viking Line and renamed Ålandsfärjan. Ran aground off Stockholm, Sweden in 1972 and damaged beyond economic repair. Scrapped at Salo, Finland. |
| Caedmon | 1973 | 761 | - | Built in 1973 by Robb Caledon Shipbuilders, Dundee for Passro Shipping Ltd, London. Operated by British Rail. Transferred in July 1984 to Passtruck Shipping Ltd, London. Transferred in November 1990 to Wightlink Ltd, Portsmouth. Laid up in February 2009 at Marchwood, Hampshire. Sold in March 2010 to shipbreakers in Esbjerg, Denmark. |
| Caesarea | 1960 | 3,992 | - | Built in 1960 by J Samuel White, Cowes, Isle of Wight. Served until 1980 when laid up in Newhaven and then sold to Superluck Enterprises Inc, Panama and renamed Aesarea. Laid up in Hong Kong in 1981. Driven ashore on 9 September 1983 during Typhoon Ellen but later refloated. Sold to the Philippines in 1984. Arrived at Kure, Japan in April 1986 for conversion to hotel ship. Scrapped at Kure in June 1986. |
| Caledonian Princess | 1961 | 3,630 | - | Built in 1961 by William Denny and Brothers, Dumbarton for the Caledonian Steam Packet Company although engine defects delayed her entry into service until 16 December 1961. Acquired by British Railways on 1 January 1963. Laid up at Newhaven, East Sussex in 1981 pending sale to Nigeria, but sale fell through due to an embargo on imports imposed by the Nigerian Government. Sold in 1982 to the Michael Quadrini Group. Renamed Tuxedo Princess in 1983, used as a floating leisure complex in Glasgow. Renamed Caledonian Princess in 1996 and then renamed Tuxedo Princess again in 1988 and relocated to Gateshead. Sold in 2008 and renamed Prince, towed to Piraeus, Greece. Scrapped in September 2008 in Turkey. |
| Cambria | 1948 | 4,972 | - | Built in 1948 by Harland & Wolff, Belfast. Served until 1975 then sold to Orri Navigation Company, Saudi Arabia and renamed Al Taif, later renamed Altaif. Scrapped in 1981. |
| Camber Queen | 1961 | 293 | - | Built in 1961 by Philip & Son, Dartmouth, Devon. Served until 1984 then sold to Transportes Fluvias do Sardo, Setúbal, Portugal and renamed Mira Troia. Scrapped in 1988. |
| Cambridge Ferry | 1963 | 3,061 | 99 004 | Train Ferry built in 1963 by Hawthorn Leslie, Hebburn. Collided with Saint Eloi on 1 May 1987 at Dover. Repaired and returned to service. Sold in 1990 to Stena Line, Gothenburg, Sweden. Sold in 1992 to Sincomar, Valletta, Malta and renamed Ita Uno. Renamed Siri in 1993 and laid up at Bari, Italy. Sold in May 2003 to Huzur Gemi Sokum Ltd, Aliağa, Turkey for scrapping. |
| Canterbury | 1928 | 2,910 | - | Built in 1928 by William Denny & Brothers for the Southern Railway. Participated in the 1935 Jubilee Fleet Review at Spithead. Requisitioned in 1939 and converted to a troopship. Participated in Operation Dynamo and the rebuilt as a landing craft. Participated in Operation Overlord. Returned to Southern Railway in 1946 and acquired by British Railways in 1948. Served until 1964, scrapped in 1965 at Willebroek, Belgium. |
| Cenred | 1973 | 761 | - | Built in 1973 by Robb Caledon Shipbuilders, Dundee for Passro Shipping Ltd, London. Operated by British Rail. Transferred in July 1984 to Passtruck Shipping Ltd, London. Transferred in November 1990 to Wightlink Ltd, Portsmouth. Laid up in February 2009 at Marchwood, Hampshire. Sold in 2010 to shipbreakers in Esbjerg, Denmark. |
| Cenwulf | 1973 | 761 | - | Built in 1973 by Robb Caledon Shipbuilders, Dundee for Passro Shipping Ltd, London. Operated by British Rail. Transferred in July 1984 to Passtruck Shipping Ltd, London. Transferred in November 1990 to Wightlink Ltd, Portsmouth. Laid up in February 2009 at Marchwood, Hampshire. Sold in 2010 to shipbreakers in Esbjerg, Denmark. |
| Cerdic Ferry | 1961 | 2,455 | - | Built in 1961 by Ailsa Shipbuilding Co Ltd, Troon, Ayrshire for the Atlantic Steam Navigation Co Ltd, London. Chartered by Sealink from January – March 1978. Sold in 1981 to Compania Armadora de Sudamerica, Panama and renamed Atlas I. Sold in 1987 to C Ventouris Sons Shipping Co, Piraeus, Greece and renamed Sifnos Express. Sold in 1995 to A K Ventouris, Piraeus and renamed Igoumenitsa Express. Sold in October 1998 to Orestes Seatrade Corp, Panama and renamed Orestes. Laid up in January 2000 at Bari, Italy. Scrapped in April 2007 at Aliağa, Turkey. |
| Chartres | 1973 | 1,647 | 99 012 | Train ferry built in 1973 by Dubigeon-Normandie SA, Nantes, France for SNCF, later operated by Sealink. On 25 January 1990, struck the pier at Dieppe, France in stormy weather, causing a 45 metres (148 ft) long gash below her waterline. Repaired and returned to service. Chartered to the French Government from December 1990 to June 1991, operated in support of the First Gulf War. Sold in November 1993 to Agapitos Line, Piraeus, Greece and renamed Express Santorini. Sold in November 1999 to Minoan Flying Dolphins, Piraeus. Withdrawn from service in July 2006 with machinery damage and laid up. Chartered to Atlanticoline in 2007. In service as of 2011. |
| Container Enterprise | 1958 | 1,453 | - | Built in 1958 by Ailsa Shipbuilding Company, Troon. Container ship built for British Railway Commission container service between Heysham-Belfast. IMO 5079018. One of the first two British purpose-built container ships. |
| Container Venturer | 1958 | 1,453 | - | Built in 1958 by Ailsa Shipbuilding Company, Troon. Container ship built for British Railway Commission container service between Heysham-Belfast. IMO 5079020. One of the first two British purpose-built container ships. |
| Cuthred | 1969 | 704 | - | Built in 1969 by Richards (Shipbuilders) Ltd, Lowestoft, Suffolk. Served until 1986 when laid up at Lymington, Hampshire. Sold in 1989 to Open Leisure, plans to convert her to a paddle vessel not carried out, renamed Clemtyne. Sold in January 1990 to Transportes Fluvias do Sardo, Portugal and renamed Mira Praia. In active service as of 2011. |
| Dalriada | 1971 | 1,599 | - | Built in 1971 by Bröderne Lothes Skibsværft, Hagesund, Norway as Stena Trailer for Stena Line, Gothenburg. Chartered by British Rail in June 1972 and renamed Dalriada. Chartered in 1980 to Townsend Thoresen and renamed Viking Trader. Chartered in July 1981 by Sealink, returned to Stena Line in October 1981 and renamed Stena Trader. Sold in 1981 to Finska Företagsfinans AB, Hangö, Finland. Transferred in 1984 to Oy Bore Line AB, Stockholm. Renamed Trader in November 1985 and then renamed Trailer before the year was out. Sold in 1986 to Bent Orla Jorgensen, Kalundborg, Danmark. Laid up in Kalundborg in October 1990. Sold in August 1991 to Polska Skandynawia, Swinoujscie, Poland and renamed Sarmacja. Sold in September 1992 to DIFKO, Denmark and renamed Wolin, remained under the Polish flag. Sold in September 1993 to PT Jemla Ferry, Indonesia and renamed Mesuji. Renamed Lampung in 1994. Gutted by fire on 16 November 2004 on a voyage from Java to Sumatra. All 144 passengers and crew rescued. |
| Darnia | 1976 | 2,807 | - | Built in 1976 by Österreichische Sciffswerften AG, Korneuburg, Austria as Stena Topper for Stena Line, Gothenburg, Sweden. Sold in July 1977 to Barclay's Mercantile Industrial Finance Co Ltd, Stranraer, Dumfries and Galloway, Scotland. Refitted by Harland and Wolff, Belfast, Northern Ireland and renamed Darnia. Chartered in August 1977 to British Rail. Registered in 1990 to Stena Line. Sold in September 1990 to Nordström & Thulin AB, Stockholm, Sweden. Renamed Nord Neptunus in April 1991. Sold in 1997 to New Neptune Shipping Co Ltd, Tallinn, Estonia and renamed Neptunia. Registered in 2000 to Neptunia Navigation Ltd, Valletta, Malta, then re-registered to Falcon Marfreight, Gibraltar. Laid up in Fort-de-France, Martinique in November 2006 with engine defects. Sold in July 2007 to Turkish shipbreakers. |
| Dinard | 1924 | 2,294 (1924–47); 1,769 (1947–70) | - | Built by William Denny & Brothers in 1924 for the Southern Railway. Participated in Operation Dynamo and Operation Overlord during the Second World War. Rebuilt in 1947 and acquired by British Railways in 1948. Withdrawn in 1958 and sold to Viking Line in 1959 and renamed Viking, serving until 1970. Scrapped in 1973 at Mariehamn, Finland. |
| Dover | 1965 | 3,640 | - | Built in 1963 by Swan, Hunter & Wigham Richardson, Newcastle upon Tyne. Renamed Earl Siward in 1978. Laid up at Newhave in 1981 and sold later that year to Sol Ferries, Limassol, Cyprus and renamed Sol Express. Laid up in 1983 at Limassol. Sold in 1986 to Chanson Lines. Towed to Newcastle upon Tyne, arriving on 18 April, converted to a floating restaurant and renamed Tuxedo Royale. Moved to the Graythorpe Basin, Newcastle on 20 April 2006. |
| Duke of Argyll | 1956 | 4,797 | - | Built by William Denny & Brothers in 1956. Sold in 1975 to Libra Maritime and renamed Neptunia. Sold to Hellenic Maritime Lines in 1987 and renamed Corinthia. Sold to Hong Kong-based owners in 1994 and renamed Faith Power. Renamed Fairy Princess in 1995 and then Zenith later that year. Caught fire and ran aground at Hong Kong in July 1995 and then scrapped. |
| Duke of Lancaster | 1956 | 4,450 | - | Built by Harland & Wolff, Belfast in 1956. Sold in 1979 to Empirewise and beached at Mostyn, Clwyd for use as a leisure centre and market. Later used as a warehouse. As of 2021, the ship is derelict at Mostyn, but there are plans to refurbish the interior. |
| Duke of Rothesay | 1956 | 4,797 | - | Built by William Denny & Brothers in 1956. Served until 1971 then laid up until 1975 when scrapped. |
| Earl Godwin | 1966 | 4,018 | - | Built in 1966 by AB Öresundvarvet, Landskrona, Sweden for Rederi AB Svea, Stockholm. Chartered from August – September 1974 by British Rail. Laid up in October 1974 at Helsingborg, Sweden. Sold the next month to Lloyd's Leasing Ltd, London. Chartered to British Rail. Renamed Earl Godwin in 1975. Registered in 1979 to Sealink. Chartered in 1984 to Sea Containers Ltd, Hamilton, Bermuda. Ran aground on 15 October 1985 off St Helier, Jersey. Laid up at Southampton in September 1988, then moved to Falmouth, Cornwall in October. Chartered to Mainland Market Deliveries, Channel Islands in January 1989 for two months. Sold in March 1990 to Navigazione Arcipelago Maddalenino Spa, Naples, Italy and placed under the management of Moby Line, renamed Moby Baby. Registered to Moby Lines srl in 2001. In service as of 2011. |
| Earl Granville | 1973 | 4,477 | - | Built in 1973 by Jos L Meyer, Papenburg, West Germany as Viking 4 for Rederi AB Sally, Mariehamn, Finland. Sold in April 1980 to Williams & Glyn's Industrial Leasing Ltd, London. Delivery scheduled for August. Renamed Earl Granville in August 1980, chartered to Sealink in September 1980 on a 10-year contract. Sold in September 1990 to Aegan Pelagos Naftiki Eteria, Piraeus, and renamed Express Olympia. Transferred in 1992 to Agapitos Express Ferries, Greece. Sold in November 1999 to Minoan Flying Dolphins, Piraeus. Laid up at Drapetsona in September 2004. Transferred in January 2005 to Hellenic Seaways. Sold to Indian shipbreakers in April 2005 and renamed Express O in June. Reflagged to Mongolia for voyage to Alang, India. |
| Earl Leofric | 1965 | 3,879 | - | Built in 1965 by Hawthorn Leslie as Holyhead Ferry I. Renamed Earl Leofric in September 1976. Served until 1980 when laid up at Newhaven. Scrapped in June 1981 at San Esteban de Pravia, Spain. |
| Earl William | 1964 | 3,670 | - | Built in 1964 by Kaldnes Mekaniske Verksted AS, Tönsberg, Norway as Viking II for Otto Thoresen Shipping AS, Oslo, Norway. Sold in December 1979 to Lloyd's Leasing Ltd, London. Chartered to British Rail and renamed Earl William. Chequered service with several periods laid up and short periods in service in between after 1987 before being laid up at Milford Haven, Dyfed in July 1991. Sold in April 1992 to Ardonis Shipping Co Ltd, Valletta, Malta and renamed William. To Neptunus Lines in July 1992 and renamed Pearl William. Sold in April 1996 to P&L Ferries Shipping Co Ltd, Valletta and renamed Mar-Julia. Sold in 1997 to Lucky Shipping SA, Kingstown, Saint Vincent and the Grenadines and renamed Cesme Stern. Arrested in Bari, Italy in July 1997. Sold in 2000 to Windward Lines, Kingstown and renamed Windward II, remained laid up at Bari until July 2001. Collided on 19 October 2003 with patrol vessel Nelson off Port of Spain, Trinidad and Tobago. Arrested at Port of Spain on 31 January 2004. Released on 30 April and chartered to Trinidad and Tobago Government. Laid up in September 2009 in the Gulf of Paria. Sold in December 2006 to Treasure Queen Tours, rebuilt as a hotel ship and renamed Ocean Pearl. In service as a floating hotel at Chaguaramas, Trinidad and Tobago as of 2011. |
| Essex Ferry | 1917 | 2,683 | - | Built in 1917 as Train Ferry No.1 for use between Richborough and Dunkirk. Laid up post-war and acquired by LNER in 1923. Requisitioned in 1940 by the Royal Navy and renamed HMS Princess Iris. Converted to a landing craft carrier in 1941. Returned to LNER in 1946 and renamed Essex Ferry. Renamed Essex Ferry II in 1957 but scrapped later that year at Grays, Essex. |
| Essex Ferry | 1956 | 3,242 | 99 003 | Train and car ferry built in 1956 by John Brown & Company, Clydebank, Renfrewshire. Served until 1983 when sold for scrap. Stripped of superstructure to train deck level and renamed Essex Ferry Pontoon, used to assist in salvage of the capsized Alexander L. Keilland accommodation platform. Scrapped at Rainham, Kent. |
| Falaise | 1946 | 3,710 | - | Built in 1947 by William Denny & Brothers for the Southern Railway. Acquired in 1948 by British Railways. Served until 1974, scrapped in 1975 at Bilbao, Spain. |
| Farringford | 1947 | 489 | - | Built in 1947 by William Denny & Brothers for the Southern Railway. Completed in 1948, served until June 1981 when the opening of the Humber Bridge meant the closure of the Humber Ferry. Sold to Western Ferries later that year but remained laid up at Hull. Scrapped in 1984 in Hull. |
| Freshwater | 1959 | 363 | - | Built in 1959 by Ailsa Shipbuilding Company, Troon Ayrshire. Served until 1984 when sold to Pounds Marine Shipping Ltd, Tipnor, Hampshire and laid up at Southampton. Sold in 1985 to Western Ferries (Clyde) Ltd and renamed Sound of Seil. Sold in 1996 to S Evans & Sons, Widnes, Cheshire. Scrapped in August 1997 at Garston, Merseyside. |
| Fishbourne | 1961 | 293 | - | Built in 1961 by Philip & Son, Dartmouth, Devon. Served until 1984 then sold to H G Pounds Marine Shipping, Portsmouth. Sold to Seagull Marine, Famagusta, Cyprus and renamed Kibris I. Suffered engine failure on 5 February 1985 and driven ashore at Morphu Bay, Cyprus. The ship broke up and sank. |
| Free Enterprise II | 1965 | 5,956 | - | Built in 1965 by I C H Holland, Schiedam, Netherlands for Townsend European Ferries. Chartered by Sealink from May – June 1980 and again from June – July 1981. Sold in October 1982 to Navigazione Arcipelago Maddalenino, Naples and renamed Moby Blu. Registered in 2001 to Moby Lines, Cagliari. Laid up at Cagliari in July 2001. Sold in July 2003 to Indian Shipbreakers. Reflagged to Saint Vincent and the Grenadines and renamed Moby B. Arrived at Alang on 15 December 2004 for breaking. |
| Galloway Princess | 1979 | 6,630 | - | Built in 1979 by Harland & Wolff, Belfast for IBOS Finance Ltd, chartered by Sealink. Registered in July 1984 to Sea Containers Ltd. Registered in May 1990 to Stena Line and renamed Stena Galloway in February 1991. Sold in 2002 to International Maritime Transport Corporation, Morocco and renamed Le Rif. Onboard fire on 22 April 2008 at Algeciras, Spain. |
| Great Western | 1933 | 1,659 | - | Built in 1933 by Cammell, Laird & Co for the Great Western Railway. Acquired by British Railways in 1948. Converted to carry freight only in 1959. Laid up in 1966 and scrapped in 1967. |
| Hampton Ferry | 1934 | 2,839 | - | Train ferry built in 1934 for the Southern Railway. Requisitioned by the Royal Navy during the Second Work War and renamed HMS Hampton. Acquired by British Railways in 1948. Sold in 1969 to Claxton Ltd, Hamilton, Bermuda and renamed Tre Arddur. Laid up at Piraeus, Greece in 1971 Scrapped at Valencia, Spain, in 1973. |
| Hengist | 1972 | 5,596 | - | Built in 1972 by Arsenal de la Marine National Française, Brest, France. Collided on 10 January 1980 with Canabal in the English Channel. Driven ashore at Folkestone, Kent on 16 October 1987. Transferred to Stena Line in 1990, renamed Stena Hengist in 1991. Sold in March 1993 to Flanmare Shipping Inc, Piraeus and renamed Romilda. Sold in April 1994 to Ventouris Sea Lines, Piraeus and renamed Apollo Express 2. Laid up in October 1995 at Piraeus due to owners financial troubles. Sold in September 1996 to Milos Naftiki Eteria, Piraeus. Renamed Panagia Ekatondapaliani. Sold in November 1999 to Minoan Flying Dolphins, Piraeus and renamed Express Artemis. Renamed Panagia Ekatondapaliani in June 2001 at the request of the Archbishop of Paros. Sold in April 2004 to Vaggelis Ventouris, Piraeus. In April 2016, she sank while docked in Piraeus. The ship was refloated in February 2017 and was scrapped in the same year. |
| Hibernia | 1949 | 4,973 | - | Built in 1949, served until 1976 when sold to Agapitos Bros, Piraeus, Greece and renamed Apollon Express. Laid up at Piraeus until 1980 when sold for scrapping. Scrapped in 1981 at Darukhana, India. |
| Holyhead Ferry I | 1965 | 3,879 | - | Built in 1965 by Hawthorn Leslie. Renamed Earl Leofric in September 1976. Served until 1980 when laid up at Newhaven. Scrapped in June 1981 at San Esteban de Pravia, Spain. |
| Horsa | 1972 | 5,590 | - | Built in 1972 by Arsenal de la Marine National Française, Brest. Collided with Lord Warden at Calais. To Stenal Line in April 1990, renamed Stena Horsa. Laid up in January 1995 at Milford Haven, Dyfed. Sold the next month to Flanmare Shipping Inc, Piraeus and renamed Penelope A. Sold in November 1999 to Minoan Flying Dolphins, Piraeus and renamed Express Penelope. Sold in January 2004 to Mimis Agoudimos, Greece and renamed Penelope A. Collided on 5 December 2004 with Evia Star at Rafina, Greece. In active service as of 2011. |
| Ilkka | 1972 | 1,565 | - | Built in 1972 by Ankerløkken Verft Florø AS, Florø, Norway for Alander Frachtschiff OY, Mariehamn, Finland. Flagged to West Germany. Sold in 1978 to Tagus Leasing Ltd, St Helier, Jersey. Chartered to Sealink from June – September 1979. Sold in 1980 to Parang Shipping Ltd, Jersey and renamed Lagan Bridge. Chartered to Sealink in 1980. Sold in December 1980 to Clydedock Engineering, Liverpool and renamed Lady Thone. Sold in 1983 to Cenargo Ltd, and renamed Merchant Navigator. Sold in October 1985 to Commonwealth Shipping Co, Panama and renamed Canada's Tomorrow. Sold in 1990 to KS Geomaster and renamed Geomaster. Soldin 1996 to James Fisher & Sons Plc, Barron in Furness, Cumbria and rebuilt as a cable-laying ship. Sold later that year to the United Arab Emirates Telephone Corporation Ltd and renamed Umm Al Anber. In service as of 2011. |
| Invicta | 1939 | 4,220 | 99 010 | Train ferry built in 1939 for the Southern Railway. Requisitioned on completion in 1940 by the Admiralty. Converted to a Landing Ship, Infantry and renamed HMS Invicta. To Southern Railway in 1945 and acquired by British Railways in 1948. Served until 1972 when scrapped at Bruges, Belgium. |
| Isle of Guernsey | 1929 | 2,143 | - | Built in 1929 by William Denny & Brothers for the Southern Railway. Requisitioned in 1939 by the Royal Navy and converted to a hospital ship. Participated in Operation Dynamo and Operation Overlord. Returned to Southern Railway in 1945 and acquired by British Railways in 1948. Served until 1961 when scrapped at Ghent, Belgium. |
| Isle of Jersey | 1930 | 2,143 | - | Built in 1930 by William Denny & Brothers for the Southern Railway. Participated in the 1935 Jubilee Review at Spithead. Acquired by British Railways in 1948. Served until 1960 when sold to Mohammed Senussi Giaber, Tripoli, Libya and renamed Lidba. Served until 1963 when scrapped at La Spezia, Italy. |
| Isle of Sark | 1932 | 2,211 | - | Built in 1932 by William Denny & Brothers for the Southern Railway. Participated in the 1935 Jubilee Review at Spithead. Acquired by British Railways in 1948. Served until 1960, scrapped in 1961 at Ghent, Belgium. |
| Isle of Thanet | 1925 | 2,701 | - | Built in 1925 by William Denny & Brothers for the Southern Railway. Requisitioned in 1940 by the Royal Navy for use as a hospital ship and renamed HMS Hospital Ship No.22. Returned to Southern Railway in 1946 and acquired by British Railways in 1948. Served until 1963, scrapped at Blyth, Northumberland in 1964. |
| Jupiter | | | - | Participated in the rescue of passengers from St Columba on 9 August 1953. |
| Lagan Bridge | 1972 | 1,565 | - | Built in 1972 by Ankerløkken Verft Florø AS, Florø, Norway for Alander Frachtschiff OY, Mariehamn, Finland. Flagged to West Germany. Sold in 1978 to Tagus Leasing Ltd, St Helier, Jersey. Chartered to Sealink from June – September 1979. Sold in 1980 to Parang Shipping Ltd, Jersey and renamed Lagan Bridge. Chartered to Sealink in 1980. Sold in December 1980 to Clydedock Engineering, Liverpool and renamed Lady Thone. Sold in 1983 to Cenargo Ltd, and renamed Merchant Navigator. Sold in October 1985 to Commonwealth Shipping Co, Panama and renamed Canada's Tomorrow. Sold in 1990 to KS Geomaster and renamed Geomaster. Soldin 1996 to James Fisher & Sons Plc, Barron in Furness, Cumbria and rebuilt as a cable-laying ship. Sold later that year to the United Arab Emirates Telephone Corporation Ltd and renamed Umm Al Anber. In service as of 2011. |
| London-Istanbul | 1914 | 1,384 | - | Built in 1914 by SA Cockerill-Ougee, Hoboken, Antwerp, Belgium as Ville de Liège for Regie voor Maritiem Transport, Ostend. Converted in 1917 to a hospital ship. Returned to Revie voor Maritiem Transport in 1917. On 11 February 1929 ran aground at Dover and sank. Refloated, repaired and returned to service. Renamed London-Istanbul in 1936. Chartered by British Railways from July 1949 to September 1950 when boiler defects put her out of service. Scrapped in 1951 in Antwerp. |
| Lord Warden | 1951 | 3,333 | - | Built in 1951 by William Denny & Brothers. Collided on 7 July 1956 with French ship Tambre and was damaged at the stern. Collided with the quayside on 2 August 1975 at Calais, repaired by Harland & Wolff, London. Laid up in 1972 at Newhaven. Returned to service in May 1974. Collided in January 1975 with Horsa at Calais. Laid up in September 1979 at Newhaven. Sold in November 1979 to Ahmed Mohamed Baaboud, Jeddah, Saudi Arabia and renamed Al Zaher. Scrapped in April 1981 by Karim Shipbreaking Industries, Gadani Beach, Pakistan. |
| Macclesfield | 1914 | 1,018 | - | Built in 1914 for the Great Central Railway. Passed to LNER in 1923. Acquired by British Railways in 1948 and served until scrappd in 1958. |
| Maid of Kent | 1955 | 3,920 | - | Built in 1955 by William Denny & Brothers. Served until 1981 when laid up at Newhaven. Scrapped in 1982 at San Esteban de Pravia, Spain. |
| Maid of Orleans | 1949 | 3,776 | - | Built in 1949 by William Denny & Brothers. Served until 1975 when laid up at Newhaven. Damaged when hit by another ship, scrapped at San Esteban de Pravia, Spain. |
| Malines | 1921 | 2,969 | - | Built in 1921 for the Great Eastern Railway. Passed to LNER in 1923 and served until laid up in 1945. Acquired by British Railways in 1948 and scrapped that year. |
| Norfolk Ferry | 1951 | 3,157 | 99 002 | Train ferry built in 1951 by John Brown & Co. Served until 1981 then laid up in the Blackwater estuary. Scrapped in 1983 in Vianen, Netherlands. |
| Normannia | 1952 | 3,543 | - | Built in 1952 by William Denny & Brothers. Served until April 1968 when transferred to SNCF, France. Transferred back to British Rail in October 1968. Sold in April 1973 to SNCF then bought back in October 1973. Damaged on 9 July 1974 in a collision in Dover Harbour. Repaired and returned to service but laid up in 1975 at Newhaven. Returned to service in July 1976 but again laid up in May 1978 at Newhaven. Sale in June 1978 to Red Sea Ferries, Dubai intended but not proceeded with. Arrived at Gijón, Spain, in December 1978 for scrapping. |
| Penda | 1971 | 1,950 | - | Built in 1971 by Kristiansands Mekaniske Verksted AS, Kristiansand, Norway as Holmia for AB Siljarederiet OY, Åbo, Finland. Sold in February 1973 to International Chartering Corporation, Singapore and renamed ADS Meteor. Registered in 1974 to Reederei und Schiffsfahrts GmbH KG, Singapore. Sold in February 1975 to P&O Ferries and renamed Penda. Chartered by Sealink from January – April 1980. Renamed NF Jaguar in June 1980. Sold in December 1981 to James Fisher and Sons Plc, Barrow in Furness and chartered to Isle of Man Steam Packet Company (IOMSPCo). Renamed Peveril in 1983. Sold to IOMSPCo in December 1992. Sold in September 2000 to Marine Express Inc, Panama and renamed Caribbean Express and laid up at Santander, Spain. Sold in January 2003 to Cadre Shipping Phnom Penh, Cambodia and renamed Express. Sold in 2009 to Indian shipbreakers. |
| Preseli | 1970 | 3,633 | - | Built in 1970 by Krögerwerft, Rendsburgt, West Germany as Isartal for Transanglia Schiffahrts GmbH, Hamburg. Renamed Antwerpen in November 1973. To Rollonoff Shipping, London in 1974 and renamed Preseli. Chartered to British Rail. Sold in November 1974 to P&O Ferries, remaining on charter to British Rail. Registered in December 1976 to Belfast Steamship Co, Belfast, Northern Ireland Charter to British Rail ended in April 1977. Renamed Pointer in June 1977. Registered in 1978 to P&O Ferries then registered in December 1984 to POETS Fleet Management Ltd. Sold in December 1985 to Sea Malta Co Ltd, Valletta, Malta and renamed Zebbug. Laid up in December 2005 at Valletta. Sold in 2006 to Fehun Shipping Co Ltd, Valletta and renamed Fehim Bey. In service as of 2011. |
| Princessan Desirée | 1971 | 5,694 | - | Built in 1971 by Aalborg Værft AS, Aalborg, Denmark for Rederi AB Göteborg-Frederikshavn Linjen AB, Gothenburg, Sweden. Registered in February 1982 to Stena Line, Gothenburg. Chartered from July – August 1981 to Sealink. Transferred in March 1983 to Varberg-Grenå Linjen AB, Varberg, Sweden and renamed Europafärjan. Registered in 1985 to Lion Ferry AB, Grenå, Sweden and renamed Europafärjan II. Renamed Lion Princess in March 1987. Sold in December 1993 to Scandi Lines AS, Sandefjord, Norway and renamed Bohus. In April 1984 Bohus collided with Conberra off Tjøme, Norway. Repaired and returned to service. Registered in January 1999 to Color Line AS, Oslo, Norway. In service as of 2011. |
| Rhodri Mawr | 1970 | 4095 | - | Built in 1970 by Verolme Dockyard, Cork. Container ship built for British Rail Sealink service between Harwich-Zeebrugge/Rotterdam. IMO 7019220. |
| Roebuck | 1925 | 769 | - | Built in 1925 by Swan, Hunter & Wigham Richardson for the Great Western Railway. Requisitioned in 1939 by the Admiralty, participated in Operation Dynamo. Returned to GWR in 1945 and acquired by British Railways in 1948. Served until 1965 when scrapped ain Belgium. |
| Saint Eloi | 1972 | 4,694 | 99 013 | Train ferry built in 1972 by Cantieri Navali di Pietra Ligure, Pietra Ligure, Italy for Angleterre-Lorraine-Alsace (ALA), Dunkirk, France but not completed until 1975 due to bankruptcy of shipyard. ALA acquired by British Rail in March 1977. Collided with Cambridge Ferry on 1 May 1987. Repaired and returned to service. Renamed Channel Entente in May 1989. Sold in February 1990 to Vessel Holdings Ltd, Nassau, Bahamas and then later that month to IOMSPCo. Renamed King Orry in December 1990. Reflagged to Isle of Man in February 1995. Sold in October 1998 to Moby Lines Srl, Naples, Italy and renamed Moby Love. Renamed Moby Love 2 in 1998 and reverted to Moby Lovey in 2002. In active service as of 2011. |
| Saint Edmunds | 1973 | 8,987 | - | Car Ferry launched in 1973 and delivered to Passtruck (Shipping) Co. Ltd., at Harwich. It was used on British Rail services between Harwich and Hook of Holland. In the aftermath of the Falklands War, St. Edmunds was requisitioned by the Ministry of Defence for use as a troop ship. It was sent to HMS Calliope on the River Tyne in Newcastle, and was commissioned as HMS Keren on Good Friday 1983. However, a few days later it was decommissioned and became MV Keren. She did not return to British Rail and was sold by the MoD in 1985. |
| Saint Germain | 1951 | 3,094 | 99 011 | Train ferry built in 1951 by Helsingør Skibsværft og Maskinbyggeri AS, Helsingor, Denmark for SNCF. From January 1976 operated by Sealink. Collided with Liberian bulk carrier Artardi off Calais with two people killed and four injured. Sold in July 1988 to Triton Ship Delivery, London and renamed Germain. Scrapped in August 1988 at Alang, India. |
| Sarnia | 1960 | 4,174 | - | Built in 1960 by J Samuel White, Cowes.. Served until 1978 when sold to Supersave Supermarkets and renamed Aquamart. Laid up in August 1978 in London. Sold in December 1978 to Grecian Fertility Inc, Greece. Renamed Golden Star in 1979. Sold in 1981 to Find Establishment, Jeddah, Saudi Arabia. Renamed Saudi Golden Star. Scrapped in February 1987 at Gadani Beach, Pakistan. |
| Sea Freightliner I | 1968 | 4,043 | - | Built in 1968 by John Readhead & Sons, South Tyneside. Container ship built for British Rail Sealink service between Harwich-Zeebrugge/Rotterdam. IMO 6803416. |
| Sea Freightliner II | 1968 | 4,043 | - | Built in 1968 by John Readhead & Sons, South Tyneside. Container ship built for British Rail Sealink service between Harwich-Zeebrugge/Rotterdam. IMO 6812352. |
| Senlac | 1972 | 5,131 | - | Built in 1972 by Arsenal de la Marine National Française, Brest. Participated in the 1977 Silver Jublilee Fleet Review. Sold in January 1985 to SNCF-owned Overseas Equipment Co Ltd., Dieppe. Sold in November 1987 to Ventouris & Sons Shipping Co, Piraeus and renamed Apollo Express. Renamed Apollo Express 1 in 1993. Sold in August 1996 to Agapitos Express Lines, Piraeus and renamed Express Apollon. Sold in November 1999 to Minoan Flying Dolphins, Piraeus. Ran aground on 28 December 2003 at Serifos, Greece, subsequently laid up at Drapetsona. Transferred to Hellenic Seaways in January 2005, returned to service in June. Laid up at Piraeus in January 2006. Sold in November to a Mr Arkoumanis. Seized by her owner on 31 January 2007 and registered to Apollonas Maritime SA, Kingstown, Saint Vincent and the Grenadines and renamed Apollon. Laid up in September 2007 at Igoumenitsa, Greece. Returned to service in July 2008. Withdrawn from service in August 2010 due to engine defects, laid up at Salamis, Greece. Scrapped at Aliağa, Turkey in October 2010. |
| Shanklin | 1951 | 833 | - | Built in 1951 by William Denny & Brothers. Served until 1980 then sold to Waverley Steam Navigation Co, Portsmouth. Sold in 1981 to Firth of Clyde Steam Packet Co and renamed Prince Ivanhoe. Sank on 3 August 1981 after striking a rock in Port Eynon Bay, Wales. One of the 800 passengers was killed. |
| Shepperton Ferry | 1935 | 2,939 | 99 009 | Train Ferry built in 1935 by Swan, Hunter & Wigham Richardson, Newcastle upon Tyne for the Southern Railway. Requisitioned by the Royal Navy in 1939 and renamed HMS Shepperton. Returned to Southern Railway in 1945 and acquired by British Railways in 1948. Served until 1972 when scrapped at Bilbao, Spain. |
| Speedlink Vanguard | 1973 | 2,638 (1973–76); 3,514 (since 1976) | 99 005 | Built in 1973 by A Vuyk & Zonen's Scheepswerven, Cappelle aan den IJssel, Netherlands as Stena Shipper for Stena AB, Gothenburg. Chartered in September 1973 to Union Steamship Co of New Zealand and renamed Union Wellington. Extended by 32 metres (105 ft) in 1976 by Howaldtswerke-Deutsche Werft, Kiel, West Germany. Chartered to Arghiris Line, Piraeus, and renamed Alpha Express. Transferred in January 1980 to Stena Cargo Line, Hamilton, Bermuda and renamed Stena Shipper. Rebuilt in 1981 by Smiths Dock Company, Middlesbrough, United Kingdom as a combined train and ro-ro ferry. Chartered in August 1981 by Sealink. Collided on 19 December 1982 with European Gateway off Harwich, United Kingdom. European Gateway sank with the loss of six lives. Renamed Caribe Express in 1987, then Stena Shipper and Kirk Shipper in 1988. Transferred in that year to Northern Marine Inc, Cayman Islands then transferred to Stena Ferries Ltd, remaining under the Cayman Islands flag. Chartered in June 1989 to Truckline Ferries, Caen, France and renamed Normandie Shipper. Sold in October 1999 to Adecon Shipping Inc, Nassau, Bahamas and renamed Bona Vista. Laid up at Świnoujście, Poland in May 2000. Sold in July 2001 to Kist-Link AS, Nassau, Bahamas and renamed Boa Vista. Sold in March 2003 to Trond A Kittelsen Shipping AS, Brevik, Norway. Laid up in Sandefjord in June 2004 and sold to Kittilsen Shipping, Panama that month. Chartered to HUAL the next month. Sold in November 2007 to Thraki Shipping Co SA, Panama and renamed Birlik 1. Scrapped in Turkey 2013 |
| St Andrew | 1931 | 2,702 | - | Built in 1931 for the Fishguard & Rosslare Harbours Board. Acquired by British Railways in 1948. Served until 1967 then scrapped. |
| St Anselm | 1979 | 7,003 | - | Built in 1979 by Harland & Wolff, Belfast. Acquired in July 1984 by Sea Containers Ltd, Hamilton, Bermuda. Sold in January 1990 to Stena Line. Renamed Stena Cambria in October 1990. Sold in February 1999 to Union Maritimia Formentera Ibiza SA, Ibiza, Spain and renamed Isla de Botafoc. Laid up in January 2010 at Dénia, Spain. Sold in March to Indian shipbreakers. Reflagged in April to St Kitts & Nevis and renamemd Winner 9, then sold to Ventouris Ferries, Panama. Renamed Bari in May 2010 and reflagged to Cyprus. In service as of 2011. |
| St Christopher | 1980 | 7,003 | - | Built in 1980 by Harland & Wolff, Belfast. Registered in July 1984 to Sea Containers Ltd. Sold in January 1990 to Stena Line AB, Gothenburg and renamed Stena Antrim. Transferred to P&O Stena Line in March 1998 and laid up at Zeebrugge, Belgium the next month. Sold in June 1998 to Lignes Maritimes du Detroit SA, Casablanca, Morocco and renamed Ibn Batouta. In service as of 2011. |
| St Columba | | 851 | - | Ran aground in Ettrick Bay, Kyles of Bute on 9 August 1953. |
| St Columba | 1977 | 7,836 | - | Built in 1977 by Aalborg Værft AS, Aalborg, Denmark. Registered in 1984 to Sea Containers Ltd, London and then registered to Stena Line, Ashford, Kent in 1990. Renamed Stena Hibernia in 1991 and Stena Adventure in 1996. Laid up at Belfast, Northern Ireland in October 1996. Sold in May 1997 to Agapitos Express Co, Piraeus, Greece and renamed Express Aphrodite. Sold in November 1999 to Minoan Flying Dolphins, Piraeus. Transferred in January 2005 to Hellenic Seaways, Greece. Laid up in September 2006. Sold in December 2006 to Namma International Trading, Jeddah, Saudi Arabia and renamed Masarrah, reflagged to Panama. In service as of 2011. |
| St David | 1947 | 3,352 | - | Built in 1947 by Cammell, Laird & Co Ltd for the Fishguard & Rosslare Railway & Harbour Company. Acquired by British Railways in 1948. Sold in 1971 to Chandris Lines, Greece and renamed Holyhead. Laid up at Perama, plans to convert her to a cruise ship were not carried out. Scrapped in 1979 in Greece. |
| St David | 1980 | 7,197 | - | Built in 1980 by Harland & Wolff, Belfast for Sealink. Sold in 1991 to Stena Line and renamed Stena Caledonia. In active service as of 2011. |
| St George | 1968 | 7,359 | - | Built in 1968 by Swan Hunter, Newcastle upon Tyne. Collided on 15 September 1982 with Koningin Juliana. Sold in November 1983 to Folkline and laid up in the River Fal. Sold in September 1984 to Psatha Navigation Co, Limassol, Cyprus and renamed Patra Express. Rebuilt as a cruise ship in 1990 and renamed Scandinavian Sky II. Sold to MSJ Shipping Services, Nassau, Bahamas and renamed Scandinavian Dawn. Chartered to SeaEscape Cruises in 1990 and renamed Discovery Dawn in 1996. Renamed Island Dawn in 1998. Sold in 2000 to Discovery Dawn Partnership, Nassau. Chartered to Viva Gaming & Resorts, renamed Texas Treasure. Used as a casino ship at Corpus Christi and Port Aransas, Texas. Sold to India for scrapping in July 2008. |
| St Helen | 1983 | 2,036 | - | Built in 1983 by Heny Robb Caledon Yard, Leith, Scotland. Registered to Sealink in July 1984. Transferred to Wightlink in July 1990. Laid up at Portsmouth, Hampshire from 1993 to May 1994. In service as of 2011. |
| St Helier | 1925 | 1,885 | - | Built in 1925 by John Brown & Company for the Great Western Railway. Took part in Operation Dynamo, requisitioned in 1940 by the Royal Navy and converted to a Landing Craft. Participated in Operation Overlord. Returned to Great Western Railway in 1945 and acquired by British Railways in 1948. Served until 1960 when scrapped at Antwerp, Belgium. |
| St Julien | 1925 | 1,885 | - | Built in 1925 by John Brown & Company for the Great Western Railway. Converted in 1939 to a hospital ship and renamed Hospital Ship No.29. Participated in Operation Dynamo. Returned to Great Western Railway in 1946 and renamed St Julien. Acquired by British Railways in 1948. Served until 1960 then sold in 1961 to Belgian shipbreakers. Reported to be in use in 1963 as an accommodation ship at Walcheren. |
| St Patrick | 1947 | 3,482 | - | Built in 1947 by Cammell, Laird & Co Ltd for the Great Western Railway in 1947. Acquired by British Railways in 1948. Sold in 1972 to Gerasimos S. Fetouris, Piraeus, and renamed Thermopylae. Sold in 1973 to Agapitos Bros, Piraeus and renamed Agapitos I. Scrapped in 1980 in Greece. |
| Southsea | 1948 | 986 | - | Built in 1948 by William Denny & Brothers. In regular service until 1986, then in reserve until 1997. Sold in that year to Brass Patch, Lymington. To Avon River Historic Vessel & Navigation Trust in 2001. Scrapped in 2005 by Smedegaarden, Esbjerg, Denmark. |
| Stena Normandica | 1974 | 5,607 | - | Built in 1974 by Rickmers, Bremerhaven, West Germany for Stena Line, Gtohenborg, Sweden. Chartered by Sealink in 1979. Reflagged to the Bahamas in February 1984. Sold to Royal Scot Leasing Ltd, Nassau, Bahamas in April 1985 and renamed St Brendan (see Wikimedia photo). Sold in October 1989 to Navigazione Arcipelago Maddalenino, Naples, Italy. Off charter in March 1990, renamed Moby Vincent in May 1990. Chartered in June 1991 to Silja Line, Vaasa, Finland and renamed Wasa Sun. Chartered from June to August 1997 to Comanav, Morocco. Reflagged to Portugal in 1998 and then reflagged to Italy in 1999. Registered to Moby Lines in 2001. In active service as of 2011. |
| Suffolk Ferry | 1947 | 3,134 | 99 001 | Train ferry built in 1947 by John Brown & Company, Clydebank for the Southern Railway. Acquired by British Railways in 1948. In service until 1980, scrapped in 1981 at Tamise, Belgium. |
| Svea Drott | 1966 | 4,018 | - | Built in 1966 by AB Öresundvarvet, Landskrona, Sweden for Rederi AB Svea, Stockholm. Chartered from August – September 1974 by British Rail. Laid up in October 1974 at Helsingborg, Sweden. Sold the next month to Lloyd's Leasing Ltd, London. Chartered to British Rail. Renamed Earl Godwin in 1975. Registered in 1979 to Sealink. Chartered in 1984 to Sea Containers Ltd, Hamilton, Bermuda. Ran aground on 15 October 1985 off St Helier, Jersey. Laid up at Southampton in September 1988, then moved to Falmouth, Cornwall in October. Chartered to Mainland Market Deliveries, Channel Islands in January 1989 for two months. Sold in March 1990 to Navigazione Arcipelago Maddalenino Spa, Naples, Italy and placed under the management of Moby Line, renamed Moby Baby. Registered to Moby Lines srl in 2001. In service as of 2011. |
| Transbaltica | 1971 | 2,325 | - | Built in 1971 by Nystads Varv AB, Nystad, Finland for Poseidon Schiffahrts OHG, Lübeck, West Germany. Chartered by Sealink from June – August 1978. Renamed Karelia in 1979. Sold in June 1980 to Rederi AB Hildegård, Mariehamn, Finland. Developed a severe list on 23 March 1986 in the northern Baltic Sea, ran aground on 24 March at Gotska Sandön, Sweden. Refloated that day and towed to Naantali where declared a constructive total loss. Scrapped in May 1986 at Naantali. |
| Transcontainer I | 1968 | 2,760 (1968–91); 2,289 (1991–2000) | 99 014 | Container ship built by Constructions Navales et Industrielles de la Méditerranée, La Seyne, France for SNCF. To Sealink in 1973, rebuilt as a train ferry in 1974. Collision on 9 January 1978 with Stena Nordica off Felixstowe, Suffolk. Sold in 1986 to Pireo Compagnia Navigazione SA, Piraeus, Greece. Sold in 1991 to Corporation Transport Sa, Panama, rebuilt as a passenger ferry and renamed Nour I. Sold in 1995 to Kassimeris Arab Bridge, Panama and renamed Niobe I. Sold in December 1995 to Rainbow Lines. Registered in 1998 to Cascade Navigation Corp, Panama. Arrived at Alang, India on 27 December 2000 for scrapping. |
| Twickenham Ferry | 1934 | 2,839 | 99 006 | Train ferry built in 1934 by Swan, Hunter & Wigham Richardson for joint owners the Southern Railway and Angleterre-Lorraine-Alsace Société Anonyme de Navigation. Requisitioned in 1939 by the Royal Navy and renamed HMS Twickenham. Returned to owners in 1945 and acquired by British Railways in 1948. Served until 1974 when scrapped at San Esteban de Pravia, Spain. |
| Ulidia | 1970 | 4,979 | - | Built in 1970 by Kristiansand M/V AS, Kristiansand, Norway as Stena Carrier for Stena Line, Gothenburg, Sweden. Sold in July 1974 to Barclay's Export & Finance Ltd, Scotland. To Sealink in December 1974 and renamed Ulidia. Laid up at Dover in April 1981. Sold in November 1981 to Corvo Shipping Inc, Piraeus and renamed Auto Trader. Sold in 1985 to Agency Shipping & Trading, Alexandria, Egypt, renamed Raga Queen in 1986. Sold in November 1987 to AS Team Askøy, Bergen, Norway. Renamed Fjordveien in 1988. Sold in December 1994 to Rederi AB Lillgaard, Mariehamn, Finland and renamed Fjärdvägen. Sold in December 1995 to Bastø Fosen AS, Trondheim, Norway and renamed Holger Stjern. Sold in June 1996 to Meridiano SRL, Genoa, Italy and renamed Holger. Sold in 2005 to Orsa Sea Tasimicilik ve Ticaret, Istanbul, Turkey and renamed Meltem G. Reflagged in May 2009 to Georgia and renamed Lider Avrasya. In service as of 2011. |
| Vienna | 1929 | 4,227 | - | Built in 1929 by John Brown & Co for the London & North Eastern Railway. Participated in the 1935 Jubilee Review. Requisitioned in 1940 by the Royal Navy for use as a troopship. Returned to London & North Eastern Railway in 1945 and acquired by British Railways in 1948. Boiler explosion in 1952 killed two people. Served until 1960 when scrapped in Belgium. |
| Vortigern | 1969 | 4,797 | 99 007 | Train ferry built in 1969 by Swan Hunter, Wallsend. Ran aground off Ostend on 4 March 1982, repairs took until 22 April to complete. Laid up in the River Fal for two months from June 1987. Sold in April 1988 to Lindos Line SA, Piraeus and renamed Milos Express. Sold in 1999 to Minoan Flying Dolphins, Piraeus and renamed Express Milos. Sold in 2003 to SAOS Shipping, Greece and renamed Niso Lemnos. Sold for breaking in September 2004. Renamed Limon and reflagged to Saint Vincent and the Grenadines in December 2004. Scrapped at Alang Beach, India in January 2005. |
| Winchester | 1947 | 1,545 | - | Built in 1947 by William Denny & Brothers for the Southern Railway and acquired in 1948 by British Railways. On 2 December 1952 she was in collision with Haslemere. On 15 February 1970 she was in collision with the Roustel Beacon and sustained severe damage to her superstructure. Repaired by John Upham Ltd, Saint Sampson, Guernsey. Sold in April 1970 to Chandris Lines, Greece and renamed Grida, then renamed Exeter and then Radiosa the following month. Converted to a cruise ship in 1972. Sold in 1982 to Radiosa SA, Panama. Laid up in 1985 at Crete, later moved to Perama. Scrapped in 1995 at Perama. |
| Worthing | 1927 | 2,288 | - | Built in 1927 by William Denny & Brothers for the Southern Railway. Requisitioned in 1939 by the Royal Navy and renamed HMS Brigadier. Participated in Operation Overlord. Returned to Southern Railway in 1945 and renamed Worthing. Sold in 1955 to John S. Latsis, Piraeus and renamed Phyrni. Laid up in 1960 and scrapped in 1964. |
