= British Rail Class 99 (ships) =

British Rail classification for train ferries

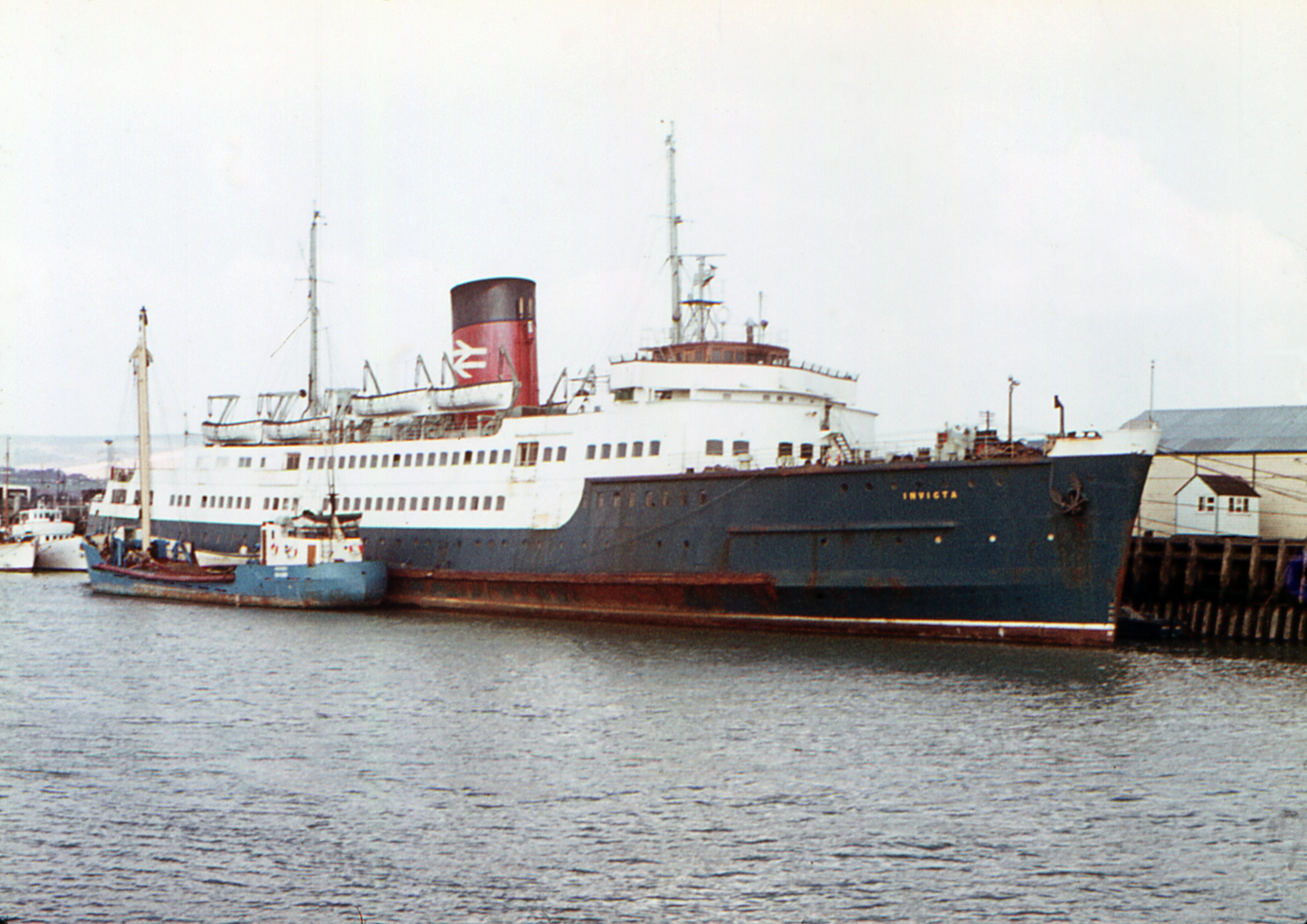
99010 Invicta at Newhaven in 1971.

The British Rail Class 99 were a fleet of train ferries, most of which were owned by Sealink, that carried rail vehicles between Britain and mainland Europe. When British Rail implemented the TOPS system for managing their operating stock, these ships were incorporated into the system in order to circumvent some of the restrictions of the application software. This allowed them to be counted as locomotives while carrying railway vehicles in the same way as a normal locomotive would haul a train.

== Details ==
There were fifteen BR Class 99s, used for carrying road and rail vehicles from Britain to the continent (road only vehicles did not receive TOPS numbers). They were of various ages and origins, but all carried the BR double arrow logo on their red funnels. This was generally set up so that the upper arrow pointed towards the bow, and so was reversed on the port side of the ship. The hull was painted blue, with "Sealink" written in large grey letters between the waterline and the deck. A grey stripe was painted on some around parts of the top of the hull, with the main body of the ship being grey or white. Unlike other non-steam locomotives with TOPS numbers, no yellow warning panels were provided. Names were painted on the bow and stern but the TOPS numbers were not visibly carried.

The number 99001 was reused for Nord Pas-de-Calais.

The table shows the numbers allocated:

Number	Name	Introduced	Builder / Ship yard	Type	Current Status
99 001	Suffolk Ferry	New to LNER 1947	John Brown and Company, Clydebank.	TF/C/P	Scrapped 1981
99 001	Nord Pas-de-Calais	New to SNCF in 1987	Normed, Dunkerque	TF/VF/P	Active (Cyprus)
99 002	Norfolk Ferry	New to BR 1951	John Brown and Company, Clydebank.	TF/C/P	Scrapped 1983
99 003	Essex Ferry	New to BR 1957	John Brown and Company, Clydebank.	TF/C/P	Scrapped 1983
99 004	Cambridge Ferry	New to BR 1963	Hawthorn Leslie and Company, Hebburn, England	TF/C/P	Scrapped 2003
99 005	Speedlink Vanguard	New to Stena Line 1973; sold to Sealink 1980	A.Vuyk and Zonen Scheepswerven B.V., Capelle aan den IJssel, Netherlands.	TF/C	Scrapped 2013
99 006	Twickenham Ferry	New to SR 1934	Swan, Hunter & Wigham Richardson Ltd, Newcastle upon Tyne	P/VF/TF	Scrapped 1974
99 007	Vortigern	New to BR 1969	Swan Hunter, Wallsend	P/VF/TF	Scrapped 2005
99 008	Anderida	New to Sealink 1971		TF/C/P	In service (Greece)
99 009	Shepperton Ferry	New to SR 1935	Swan Hunter, Newcastle upon Tyne.	P/VF/TF	Scrapped 1972
99 010	Invicta	New to SR 1939	William Denny & Bros Ltd, Dumbarton	P/VF/TF	Scrapped 1972
99 011	Saint Germain	New to BR/SNCF 1951	Helsingor Skibsvaerft og Maskinbyggeri A/S Helsingor, Denmark	P/VF/TF	Scrapped 1988
99 012	Chartres	New to SNCF 1973		P/VF/TF	Scrapped 2022
99 013	Saint Eloi	New to BR / Angleterre-Lorraine-Alsace Société Anonyme de Navigation (ALA) 1975	Cantieri Navali di Pietra Ligure, Genoa, Italy	P/VF/TF	In service (Italy)
99 014	Transcontainer I	New to SNCF 1968	Constructions Navales et Industrielles de la Mediterranee, La Seyne, France.	TF/C	Scrapped 2001

Key	
P	Passenger
VF	Vehicle Ferry
TF	Train Ferry
C	Container ship

There were also a number of other Sealink vessels which did not carry rail vehicles and so did not receive TOPS numbers.

While in traffic several vessels were involved in various incidents. Vortigern grounded on the approach to Ostend in 1982. Sealink Vanguard collided with European Gateway on the approach to Harwich, also in 1982, causing serious damage to the latter vessel, which nearly sank altogether. This was the most serious accident that a Class 99 was involved in while working for Sealink, resulting in six fatalities.

== Disposal ==
The mixed origins of the fleet meant that disposal was carried out in a patchy manner, and at no point were all 15 Class 99s in service. Instead, ships were cut up at any time after the 30-year-old mark, and so Sealink disposed of 6 prior to privatisation in 1984. No.99 009 Shepperton Ferry was withdrawn and broken up in Spain in 1972 while No.99 010 Invicta was dismantled in the Netherlands in the same year. No.99 006 Twickenham Ferry, the oldest member of the fleet, was withdrawn for scrap in 1974. No.99 001 Suffolk Ferry, No.99 002 Norfolk Ferry and No.99 003 Essex Ferry were all withdrawn around 1980 and broken up shortly afterwards.

The remaining eight members of the fleet (99 004/5/7/8/11-14) left British Rail ownership when Sealink was sold in 1984, after which they were invariably renamed (sometimes several times, making them harder to trace). The vessels were scattered across the world, with new homes including Cuba, Greece, Canada and Malta. Subsequently, six of the ferries (now all over 30 years old) have been broken up, but two were still in service as of 2023. No.99 008 Anderida was, from 1988, owned by Cooperative de Transport Maritime et Aerien in Canada, but has since been sold to the Greek company Ainaftis. She is the oldest survivor of the fleet, dating back to 1971. She now carries the name Armenistis and retains several historic features. No.99 013 Sporades Star is now owned by Seajets.

Meanwhile, No.99 011 St. Germain was dismantled in India in 1988. No.99 014 Transcontainer I was broken up early in 2001, also in India, while No.99 004 Cambridge Ferry met its end in Turkey in 2003 after working off Malta as Ita Uno and Sirio. No.99 007 Vortigern moved to Greece for ferry services around the islands, for which she was renamed Express Milos. She finished her days as the Nisos Limnos; Greek regulations on the age of passenger ferries prompted her to be sold for scrap in India in 2004.

99 005 Speedlink Vanguard was scrapped in 2013, while 99 012 Chartres was scrapped in 2022. As time goes by the surviving Class 99s (99008/13) will probably also be broken up.

== See also ==
- British Railways ships for details of all ships operated by British Railways and Sealink.
