= Essex Ferry =

Two train ferries have been named Essex Ferry.

- SS Essex Ferry, in service 1947–1956
- MV Essex Ferry, in service 1957–1981
