= Sporades Star =

Passenger ferry (1975)

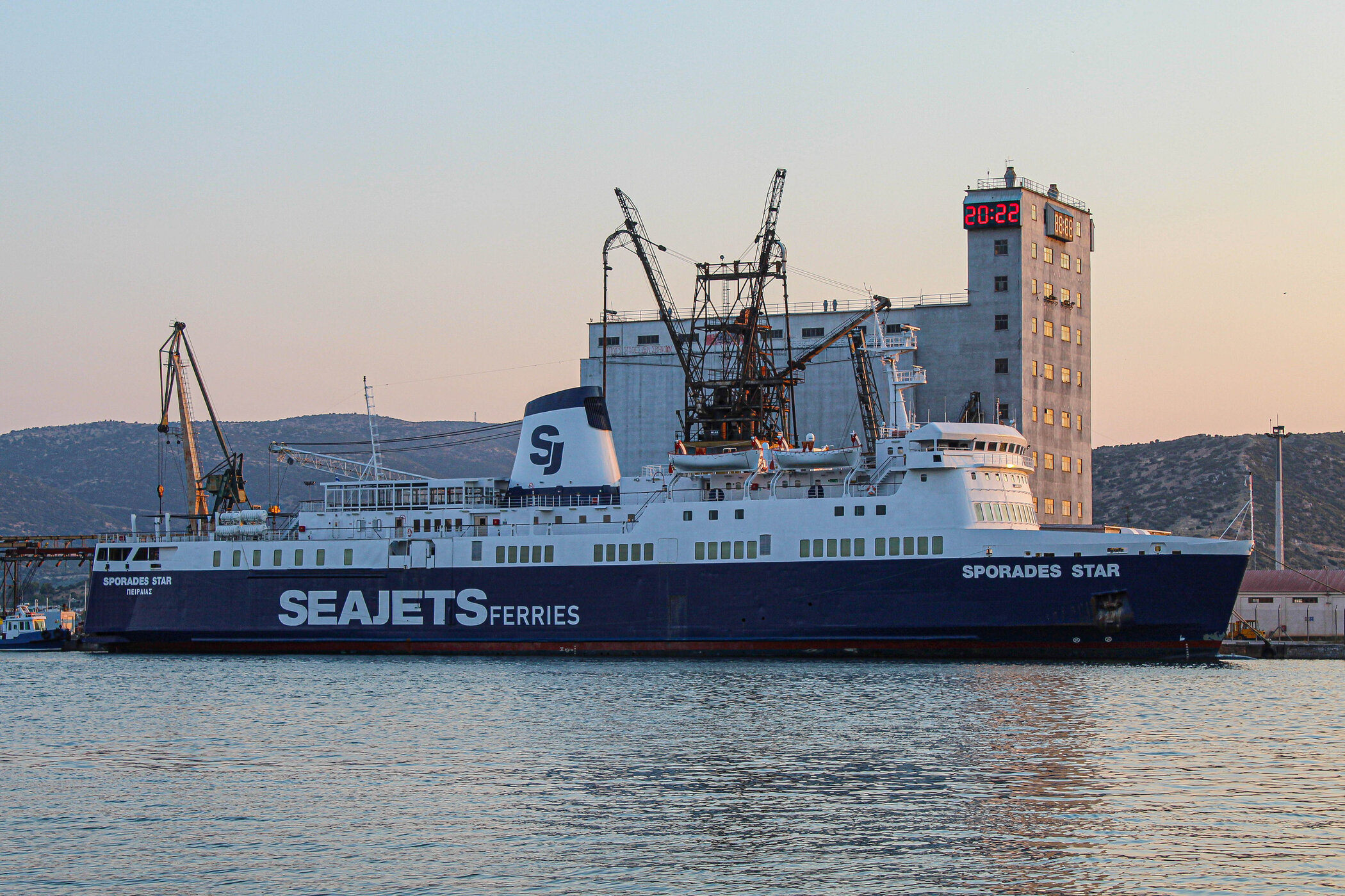
- Sporades Star in Volos

History
- Name: 1975–1989: Saint Eloi; 1989–1990: Channel Entente; 1990–1998: King Orry; 1998: Moby Love; 1998–2002: Moby Love 2; 2002–2017: Moby Love; 2017–2019: Aeolos; 2019–2021: Azores Express; 2021–2022: Aqua Star; 2022–Present: Sporades Star
- Owner: 1975–1990: Angleterre-Lorraine-Alsace; 1990: Vessel Holdings; 1990–1998: Isle of Man Steam Packet Company; 1998–2017: Moby Lines; 2017–2021: Med Lines Shipping; 2021–Present: Seajets
- Operator: 1975–1990: Angleterre-Lorraine-Alsace; 1986–1988: SNCF; 1988–1990: Angleterre-Lorraine-Alsace; 1990–1998: Isle of Man Steam Packet Company; 1998–2017: Moby Lines; 2017–2021: Med Lines Shipping; 2021–Present: Seajets
- Port of registry: (France) Dunkirk (1975–1989); (The Bahamas) Nassau (1989–1995); (Isle of Man) Douglas (1995–1998); (Italy) Naples (1998–2017); (Greece) Piraeus (2017–present)
- Route: 1975–1986: Dover – Dunkirk; 1986: Calais – Dover; 1986–1988: Dover – Dunkirk; 1988: Calais – Dover; 1989: Larne – Stranraer; 1989: Dún Laoghaire – Holyhead; 1989–1990: Calais – Dover; 1990–1998: Douglas – Heysham; 1990–1998: Douglas – Liverpool; 1998–2017: Piombino – Portoferraio; 2017–2019: Under Repairs; 2019: Alexandroupoli – Samothraki; 2019–2021: Laid Up; 2021: Lavrion – Lemnos – Agios Efstratios – Kavala; 2021–2022: Laid Up; 2022–Present: Volos – Skiathos – Skopelos – Alonissos
- Ordered: 24 November 1969
- Builder: Cantieri Navali di Pietra Ligure
- Yard number: 12
- Laid down: 1 February 1971
- Launched: 26 February 1972
- Completed: February 1975
- Maiden voyage: 1975
- In service: March 1975
- Identification: IMO number: 7207451; Callsign FNKC (1990–98); Callsign IBDB (since 1998); MMSI Number 247322000
- Status: Under repairs

General characteristics
- Tonnage: 4,649 GRT; 1,849 NRT
- Length: 114.59 m (375 ft 11 in)
- Beam: 18.62 m (61 ft 1 in)
- Draught: 4.11 m (13 ft 6 in)
- Installed power: Two Pielstick 16PC2-2V-400 diesel engines
- Speed: 21.8 knots (40.4 km/h)
- Capacity: 1,000 passengers, 48 berths, 160 cars. 35 railway wagons or 10 carriages and 11 wagons.

Sporades Star is a passenger ferry which belongs to Seajets. She was previously owned by Moby Lines and was named Moby Love. She was launched in 1972 as Saint Eloi but not completed until 1975 due to the bankruptcy of the shipyard that built her. She was built as a multi-purpose ferry, capable of carrying railway rolling stock as well as road vehicles.

Built for Angleterre-Lorraine-Alsace, she was renamed Channel Entente in 1989. She served on cross-channel routes until she was sold in 1990 to the Isle of Man Steam Packet Company (IoMSPCo) and reflagged to the Bahamas. Renamed King Orry, she was reflagged to the Isle of Man in 1995. In 1998, she was sold to Moby Lines and renamed Moby Love, and then Moby Love 2. She was renamed Moby Love again in 2002 until 2017 when she sold in Greek company.

== Description ==
The ship is 114.59 metres (375 ft 11 in) long, with a beam of 18.62 metres (61 ft 1 in). She has a depth of 11.48 metres (37 ft 8 in) and a draught of 4.11 metres (13 ft 6 in). She is powered by two Pielstick 16PC2-2V-400 diesel engines giving a total power output of 10,740 kilowatts (14,400 hp). These can propel the ship at 21.8 knots (40.4 km/h).

Originally built as a train and roll on, roll off ferry, the ship has 48 berths. She can carry 1,000 passengers and 160 cars. The ship is assessed as 4,649 GRT, 1,849 NRT. She could carry 35 railway wagons or 10 carriages and 11 wagons.

== History ==
Saint Eloi was ordered on 24 November 1969 and her keel was laid on 2 January 1971. Built by Cantieri Navali di Pietra Ligure, Pietra Ligure, Italy, she was yard number 12 and was launched on 26 February 1972. She was due to be delivered in October 1972, but the shipyard went bankrupt after her launch and the unfinished ship was laid up in Genoa. Work resumed on 1 July 1972. The Italian Government had to finance the completion of the ship, which was delivered to ALA in February 1975.

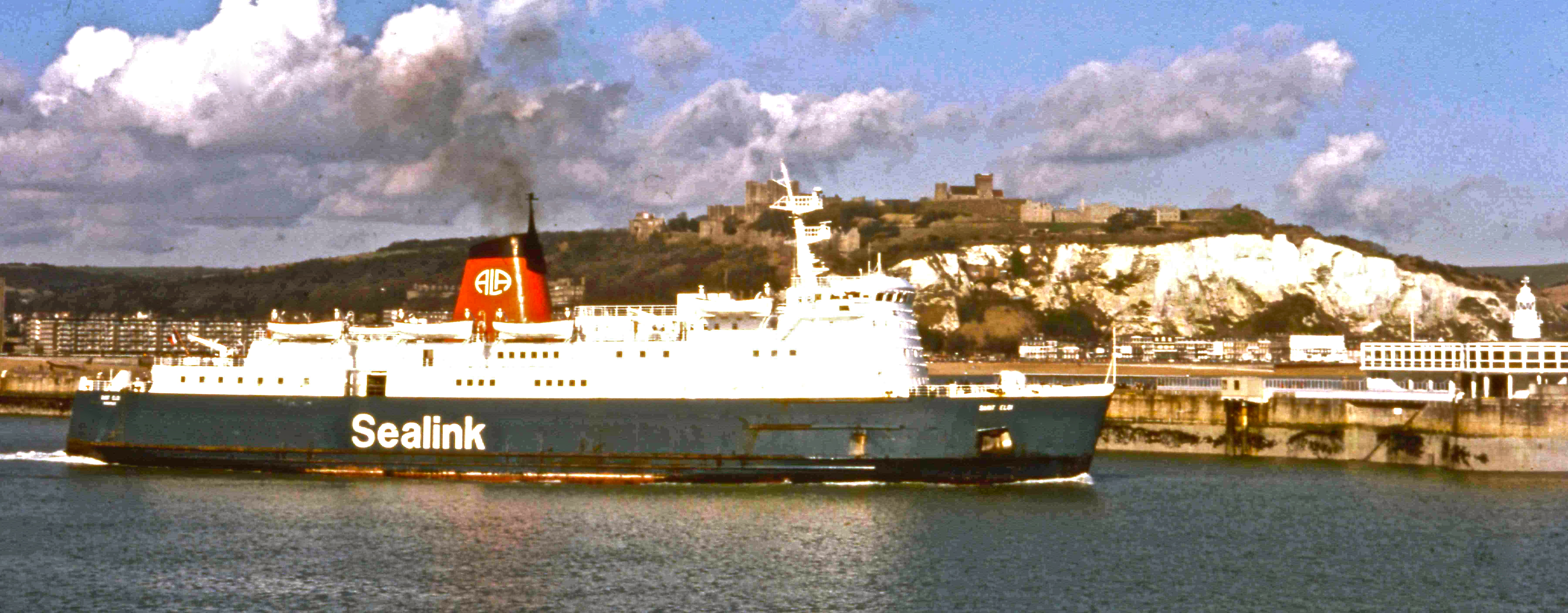
Saint Eloi leaving Dover in Angleterre-Lorraine-Alsace 'Sealink' livery in 1980.

Saint Eloi entered service with ALA on the Dover–Dunkerque route on 12 March 1975. Her port of registry was Dunkerque and the IMO Number 7207451 was allocated. On 23 March 1977, ALA was bought outright by British Rail. As she could carry railway wagons, Saint Eloi was classed as a locomotive, being allocated to Class 99 under TOPS. Saint Eloi was allocated the TOPS number 99 013.

On 27 May 1986, Saint Eloi was chartered for four months by SNCF. She was employed on the Calais–Dover route. She reverted to the Dover–Dunkerque route on 27 September, serving until 24 April 1988 when she was again chartered by SNCF for use between Calais and Dover. On 1 May 1987, Saint Eloi was in collision with Cambridge Ferry just outside the Port of Dover. Both ships damaged. Saint Eloi was repaired at Dunkerque, re-entering service on 16 May. On 23 July 1988, Saint Eloi collided with the breakwater at Dover and suffered a damaged stern. Nord Pas-de-Calais replaced Saint Eloi and Saint Germain on the Calais - Dover route. On 8 January 1989, she entered service on the Larne–Stranraer route. On 4 March 1989, Saint Eloi entered service on the Dún Laoghaire–Holyhead route, which she operated on until 28 April. This enabled the regular ferry St Columba to undergo an overhaul at Bremerhaven, West Germany. On 20 May, Saint Eloi was renamed Channel Entente. She entered service on the Calais - Dover route on 25 May 1989, serving until the end of the year.

On 11 January 1990, Channel Entente arrived at Douglas, Isle of Man for berthing trials. On 5 February 1990 she was reflagged to the Bahamas, with Nassau as her port of registry. The call sign FNKC was allocated. She was sold to Vessel Holdings Ltd, Nassau, on 9 February and then sold to the IoMSPCo, Douglas on 14 February. She entered service on the Douglas–Heysham route on 19 February, serving until 27 September when she was sent to Messrs Wright & Beyer, Birkenhead for a refit. during the refit, her passenger accommodation was extended and vehicle side-loading doors were fitted. An additional bow thruster was fitted. During her time with the IoMSPCo, the rails were filled in and the buffers were removed. On 8 December 1990, Channel Entente was renamed King Orry, she re-entered service on the Douglas–Heysham and Douglas–Liverpool routes on 9 December. King Orry was fitted with stern doors in 1992. In February 1995, King Orry was reflagged to the Isle of Man, with Douglas as her port of registry. Her last day of service with IoMSPCo was 28 September 1998.

In October 1998, King Orry was sold to Moby Lines Srl, Naples, Italy. On 21 October, she was renamed Moby Love. The call sign IBDB was allocated. She departed Birkenhead on 23 October bound for Livorno, arriving on 29 October. Later that year, she was renamed Moby Love 2. She entered service on the Piombino–Portoferraio route in April 1999. She was renamed Moby Love in 2002 until 2017 when she sold to Med Lines Shipping in Greece and renamed it Aeolos. She arrived in Greece in 2017 along with Moby Baby and both ships renamed Aeolos and Anemos. However, both ships remained laid-up until Anemos was sold for scrap and Aeolos remained laid-up. The ship was renamed again Azores Express and remained laid-up with until the summer of 2019, when she returned to service for one day in Alexandroupoli-Samothraki route without success. She was laid-up once again in Perama until 2021, when she was sold to Seajets, which renamed her Aqua Star. The ship changed name and signals, and returned to service, replacing Aqua Blue on the Lavrion-Agios Efstratios-Lemnos-Kavala route, again without any success, leading to her getting laid-up again. In 2022, Seajets decided to return her to service with a new name and on a new route. She was renamed Sporades Star and started operating on the Volos-Skopelos-Skiathos-Alonissos route.

== Accidents and Incidents ==
=== 2023 collision (Syros) ===
On 8 August 2023, during the evening hours, the vessel struck a floating dry dock within a shipyard facility while entering the port of Syros. It was operating an itinerary from Milos to Kimolos, Sifnos, Serifos, and Paros. The ship successfully docked and safely disembarked 94 passengers and 21 vehicles.

An inspection by the Local Ship Inspection Team revealed a hull breach approximately four meters long and one meter high on the port side of the bow, located above the bulbous bow. The impact also caused a breach measuring one meter by five meters on the deck of the floating dry dock. An underwater inspection by a professional diver confirmed no further damage below the waterline, and no marine pollution was reported. The local port authority banned the vessel from departing until its classification society issues a certificate of seaworthiness and class maintenance.

==== 2023 grounding (Syros) ====
On 23 August 2023, during its morning itinerary to Serifos, Sifnos, Kimolos, and Milos, the vessel struck a reef approximately 3 nautical miles south of the port of Hermoupolis on Syros. The ship returned to the port under its own power and safely disembarked 90 passengers, 22 cars, and 7 motorcycles. The operating company subsequently arranged alternative transportation for the passengers to reach their destinations.

An underwater inspection by a professional diver revealed a longitudinal hull breach on the starboard side, which caused water ingress. The inflow was successfully contained using the ship's own pumps alongside equipment provided by the Syros Fire Service. While no marine pollution was detected, local authorities deployed floating booms and anti-pollution materials as a preventative measure.

The local port authority banned the vessel from departing until its classification society issues a certificate of seaworthiness and class maintenance. Additionally, the ship's captain was arrested for violating regulations regarding the prevention of collisions at sea and for dangerous interference with maritime transit under the Greek Penal Code.

== In popular culture ==
The ship was featured in the 1997 ChuckleVision episode Loch Aye, in which the Chuckle Brothers travel from Heysham to Douglas on board the King Orry, thinking they were heading to the Loch Aye Highland games in Scotland (actually the Loch Aye Island Games in the Isle of Man).

== Gallery ==
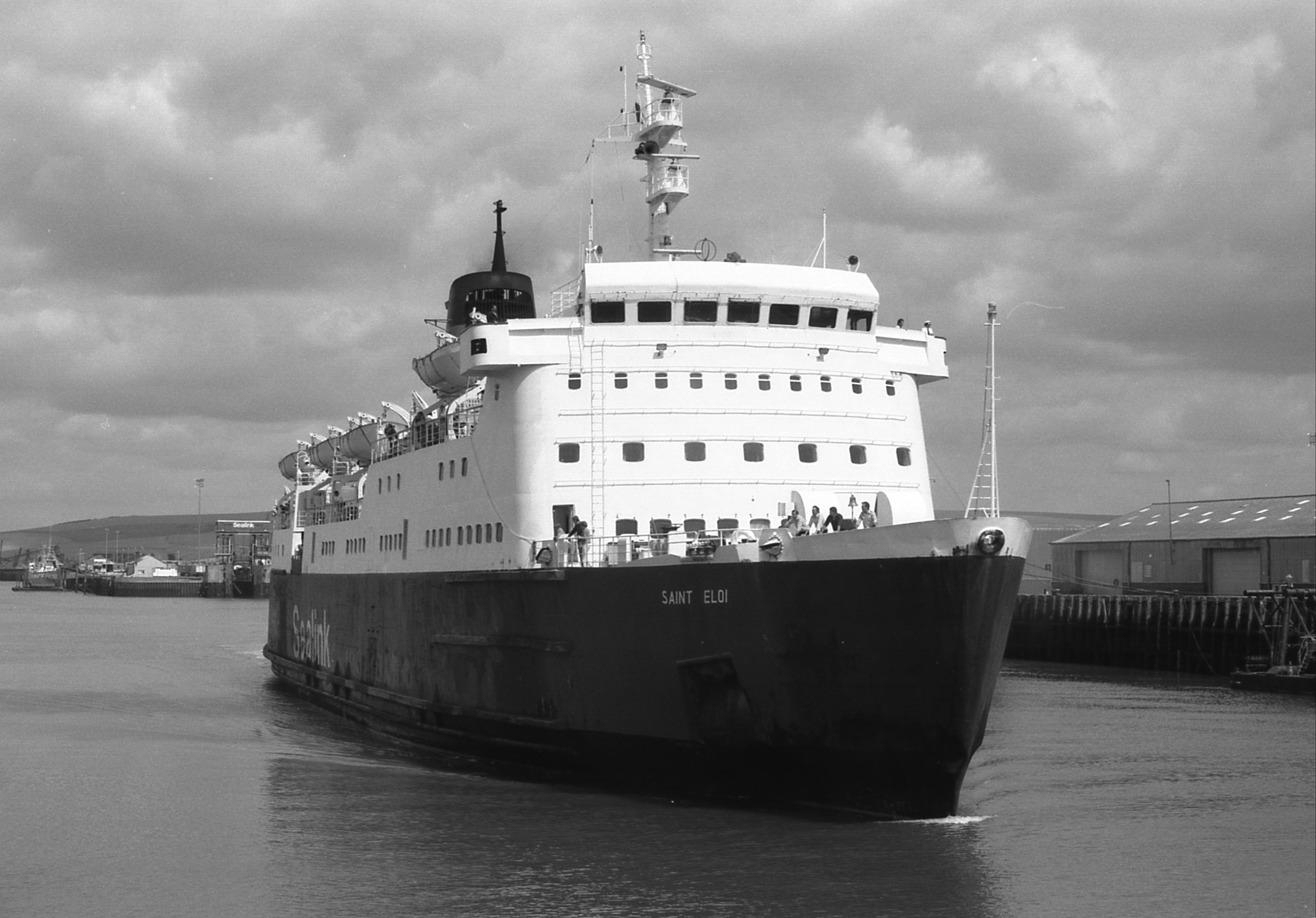
Saint Eloi at Newhaven in the 1980s.

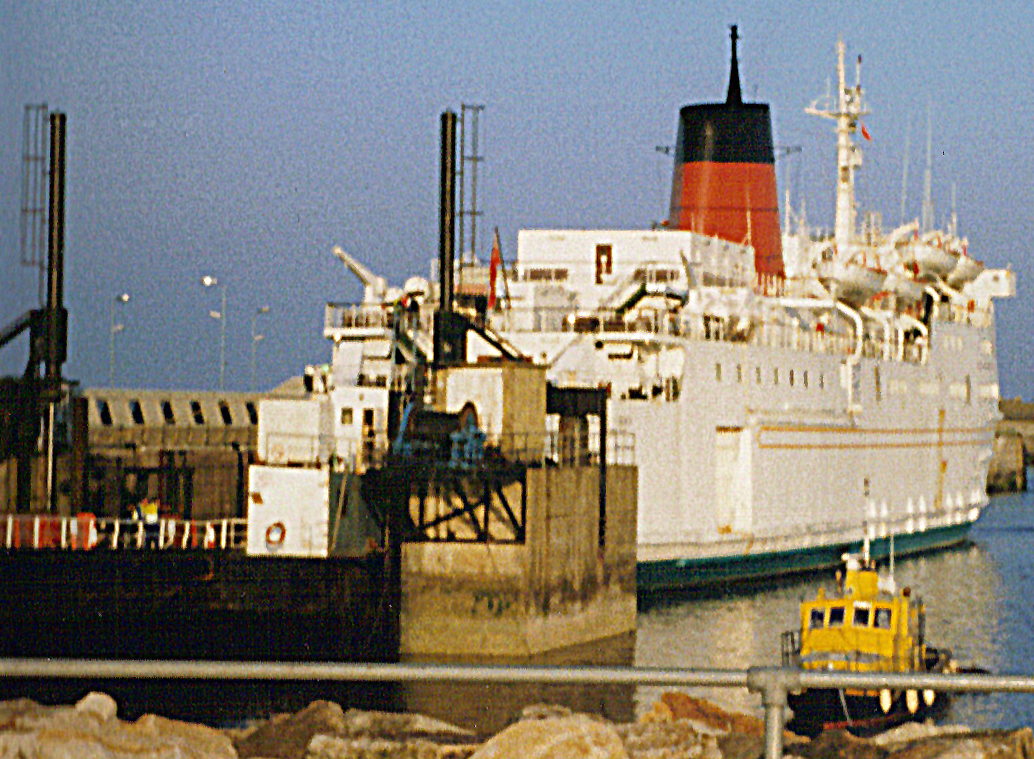
King Orry at Douglas in 1996.

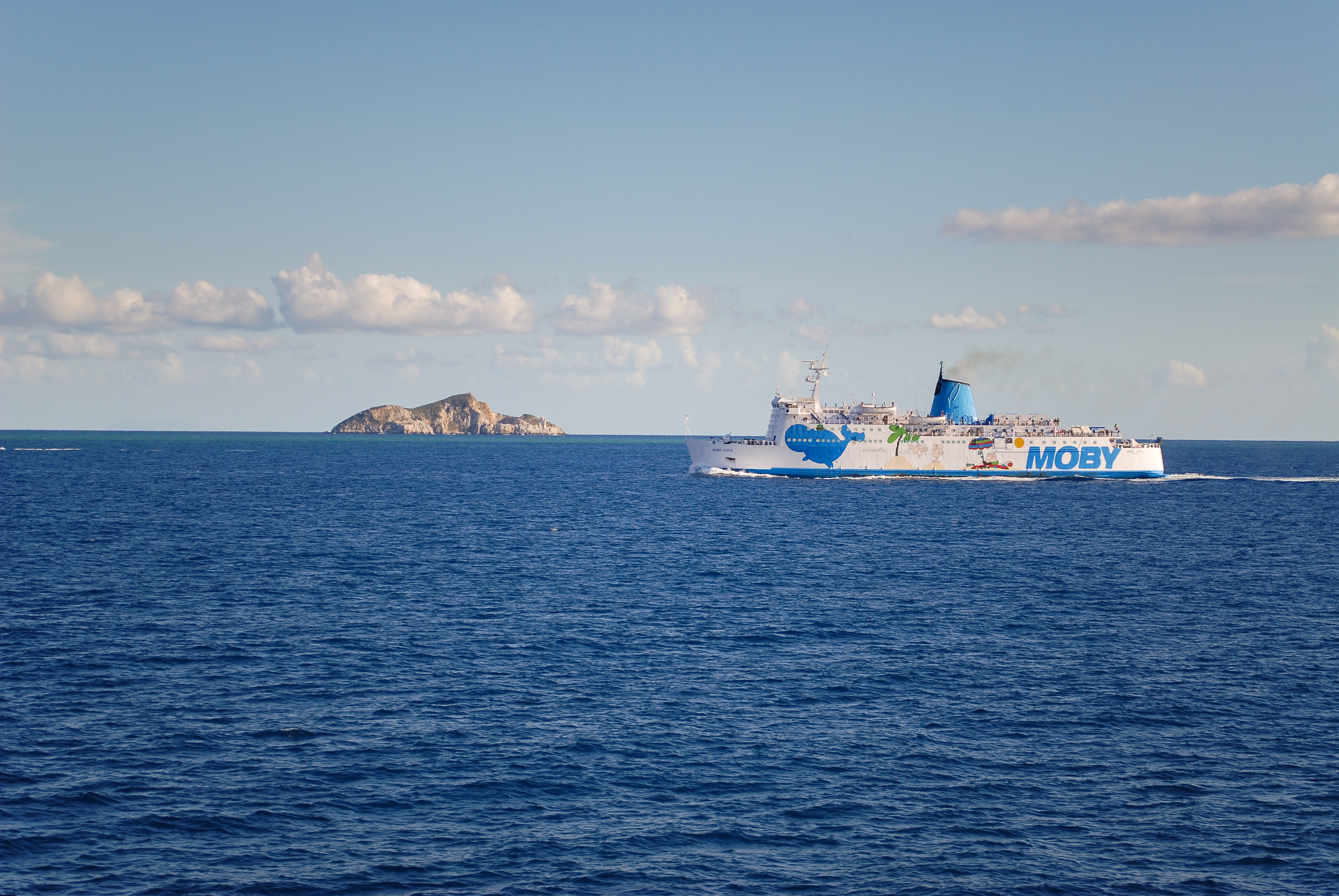
Moby Love en route to Piombino from Isola d'Elba.
