= MV Cambridge Ferry =

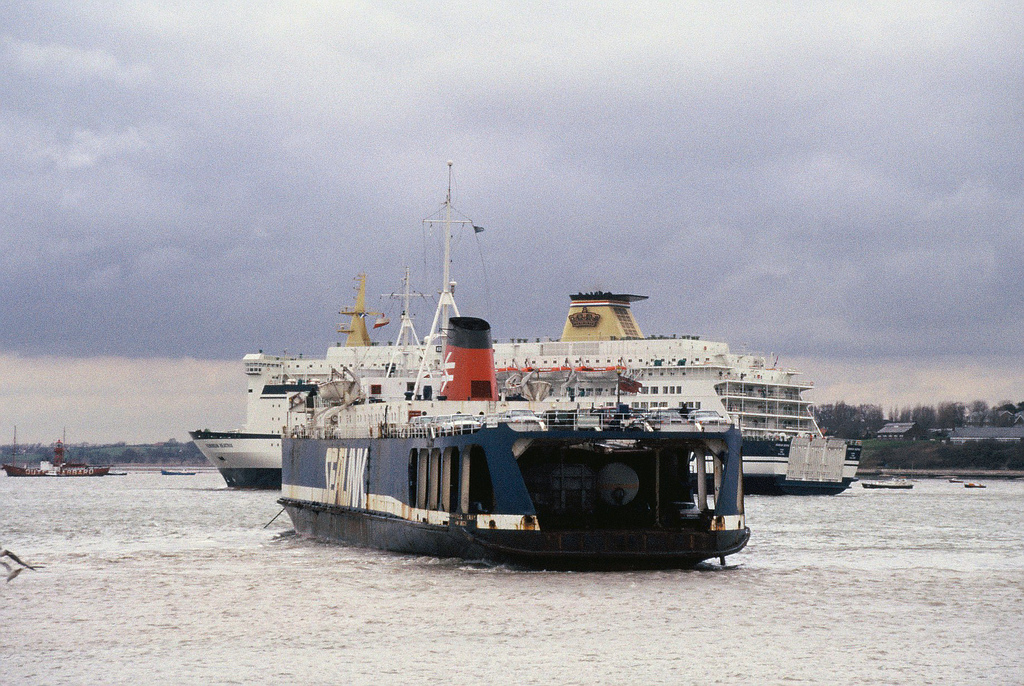

History
- Name: Cambridge Ferry (1963–92); Ita Uno (1992–93); Sirio (1993–2003)
- Owner: British Railways Board (1963–78); Sealink (1979–90); Stena Line (1990–92); Sincomar Malta (1992–2003)
- Operator: British Rail (1963–78); Sealink (1979–90); Stena Line (1990–92); Sincomar Malta (1992–2003)
- Port of registry: Harwich, United Kingdom (1963–92); Valletta, Malta (1992–98); Panama (1998–2003)
- Route: see text
- Builder: Hawthorn Leslie & Company
- Cost: £700,000 (1963) (equivalent to £17.3 million in 2024)
- Yard number: 754
- Launched: 1 November 1963
- Completed: December 1963
- Maiden voyage: 2 January 1964
- Out of service: 1993
- Identification: United Kingdom Official Number 305493 (1963–92); Call sign GMOB (1963–92); IMO number: 6400044 (late 1960s–2003)
- Fate: Scrapped

General characteristics
- Class & type: Train ferry
- Tonnage: 3,294 GRT, 1,111 NRT, 1,825 DWT
- Length: 403 feet 0 inches (122.83 m)
- Beam: 61 feet 4 inches (18.69 m)
- Draught: 12 feet 1 inch (3.68 m)
- Installed power: 2 x 7cyl Mirrlees National diesel engines, 3,720 horsepower (2,770 kW)
- Propulsion: Twin screws
- Speed: 13.5 knots (25.0 km/h)
- Capacity: 35 railway wagons or 200 motor cars, 100 passengers (1963–77); 35 railway wagons or 250 motor cars, 100 passengers (from 1977)

Cambridge Ferry was a 3,294 GRT train ferry that was built in 1963 for the British Railways Board. She was sold to Malta in 1992 and renamed Ita Uno. She was renamed Sirio in 1993 and reflagged to Panama in 1998. The ship was scrapped in Turkey in 2003.

== Design ==
The ship was 403 feet 0 inches (122.83 m) long, with a beam of 61 feet 4 inches (18.69 m) and a draught of 12 feet 1 inch (3.68 m). She was propelled by two Mirrlees 4-stroke single action diesel engines. The engines had seven cylinders of 15 inches (380 mm) stroke by 20 inches (510 mm) bore. They were rated at 3,720 horsepower (2,770 kW) and drove twin screw propellers. She had a speed of 13.5 knots (25.0 km/h). The ship was fitted with the Flume stabilisation system and had controllable pitch propellers; both of these were a first within the British Railways fleet.

== History ==
Cambridge Ferry was built by Hawthorn Leslie & Company, Hebburn as yard number 754. She was allocated the United Kingdom Official Number 305493. Her call sign was GMOB. Built at a cost of £700,000, the ship was launched on 1 November 1963 and was completed in December 1963. Her port of registry was Harwich. She could carry 38 railway wagons or 200 motor cars, and 100 passengers.

Cambridge Ferry made her maiden voyage from Harwich to Zeebrugge, Belgium on 2 January 1964. With the introduction of IMO Numbers in the late 1960s, Cambridge Ferry was allocated the IMO Number 6400044.

In 1972, Cambridge Ferry and Essex Ferry were chartered and made ten voyages between Holyhead and Dublin, Ireland to deliver new Mark 2 coach rolling stock to CIÉ (hauled from Derby Works to Holyhead). In April and May 1975, Cambridge Ferry operated between Stranraer and Larne. In 1976, she was used to transport motor vehicles from Falmouth, Cornwall to Zeebrugge for use in the film A Bridge Too Far.

In 1977, Cambridge Ferry was extended at a cost of £91,000. This was to enable her to carry an additional 50 motor cars, and use the docks at Dunkerque, France. She was registered to Sealink on 1 January 1978.

In May 1980, Cambridge Ferry entered service on the Holyhead - Dún Laoghaire route following the breakdown of St Columba and her replacement Avalon. She had been in dry dock at the time and was pressed into service whilst replacement ships were sourced and repairs effected.

In April 1982, she was withdrawn from the Harwich – Zeebrugge route. From May - November 1982, Cambridge Ferry served on the Holyhead - Dún Laoghaire route. In December, she operated on the Dover - Dunkerque route, returning to the Harwich - Zeebrugge route in January 1983.

In 1987, she was refitted at Immingham, including modifications to make her more suitable for use at Dover, from where she operated from February 1987.

On 1 May 1987, she collided with Saint Eloi off Dover. Both vessels were severely damaged. Repairs to Cambridge Ferry cost £78,000. She was withdrawn from the Dover - Dunkerque route on 31 December 1987, but was reinstated from September to mid-October 1988 before being laid up in the River Fal.

In November 1988, she was put into service between Rosslare and Fishguard. Ownership of Cambridge Ferry was transferred to Stena Line in January 1990. She was laid up at Milford Haven in March 1990 and put into service the next month between Stranraer and Larne. She returned to the Rosslare - Fishguard route between June and September 1990 and also between December 1990 and January 1991.

She operated the Holyhead - Dún Laoghaire route in February 1991 whilst Stena Cambria was under repair, before returning to the Stranraer - Larne route. She was laid up at Fal River in summer 1991. Cambridge Ferry was withdrawn from service on 15 March 1992 and was then laid up at Milford Haven.

On 21 April 1992, Cambridge Ferry was sold to Sincomar Malta and renamed Ito Uno. She departed from Milford Haven on 21 April 1992 for Valletta, where she underwent a rebuild. She was renamed Sirio in 1993 and was laid up at Bari, Italy. Sirio was reflagged to Panama in 1998. She was broken up at Aliağa, Turkey in May 2003.
