= SS Invicta (1939) =

Passenger ferry built in 1939

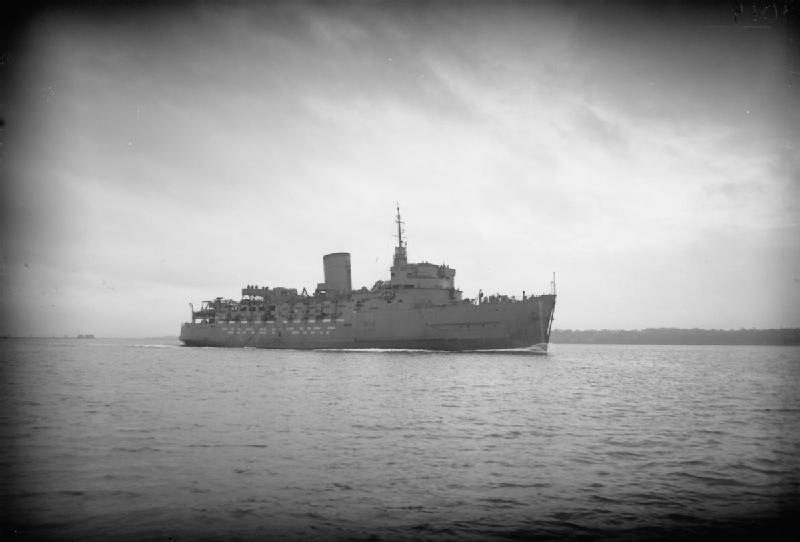
- HMS Invicta underway on completion

History
- Name: Invicta
- Owner: Admiralty (1939–42); Royal Navy (1942–45); Southern Railway (1945–47); British Transport Commission (1948–62); British Railways Board (1963–72)
- Operator: Admiralty (1939–42); Royal Navy (1942–45); Southern Railway (1945–47); British Rail (1948–70); Sealink (1970–72)
- Port of registry: (United Kingdom) London (1940–42); (United Kingdom) London (1942–45); (United Kingdom) London (1945–72)
- Route: Dover – Calais (1945–72)
- Ordered: 13 February 1939
- Builder: William Denny & Brothers, Dumbarton
- Yard number: 1344
- Launched: 14 December 1939
- Completed: June 1940
- Commissioned: 3 June 1942
- Decommissioned: 9 October 1945
- Maiden voyage: 27 June 1940
- In service: 1 July 1940
- Out of service: 8 August 1972
- Identification: Code Letters GLJG (1939–43); Code Letters GLJQ (1943–72); United Kingdom Official Number 167606; IMO number: 5162217 ( -1972); TOPS Number 99 010 (1968-72)
- Fate: Scrapped

General characteristics
- Type: Passenger ship
- Tonnage: 4,220 GRT; 1,982 DWT
- Length: 336 ft 5 in (102.54 m)
- Beam: 50 ft 1 in (15.27 m)
- Draught: 12 ft 9 in (3.89 m)
- Depth: 24 ft 5 in (7.44 m)
- Installed power: 4 steam turbines
- Propulsion: Twin propellers
- Speed: 22 knots (41 km/h)
- Capacity: 1,304 passengers

Invicta was a passenger ferry built in 1939 for the Southern Railway and requisitioned on completion by the Admiralty for use as a troopship, serving in the Second World War as HMS Invicta. She was returned to the Southern Railway in 1945 and passed to British Railways in 1948. With the introduction to TOPS (a new numbering system) in 1968, Invicta was one of 14 "locomotives" classified as Class 99. She was allocated TOPS Number 99 010. Invicta served on the Dover – Calais route from 1946 until 1972 when she was withdrawn from service and scrapped.

== Description ==
Invicta was ordered on 13 February 1939 from William Denny & Brothers of Dumbarton. She was built as yard number 1344 and was launched on 14 December 1939. Completion was in June 1940.

Invicta was 336 feet 5 inches (102.54 m) long, with a beam of 50 feet 1 inch (15.27 m) and a depth of 24 feet 5 inches (7.44 m). She was 4,178 GRT and 1,982 NRT. She had a draught of 12 feet 9 inches (3.89 m).

She was powered by four Parsons turbines, that were built by Denny's. The four turbines drove twin screw propellers through single reduction gearing and had a total power output of 11,000 shaft horsepower (8,200 kW). These gave Invicta a speed of 22 knots (41 km/h). Steam was supplied by two Yarrow water tube boilers operating at 250 pounds per square inch (17 atm). Originally coal fired, the boilers were converted to oil in 1946.

== War service ==
Invicta was completed in June 1940. The Admiralty then requisitioned her and she left Dumbarton on 27 June for Clynder, where she was laid up on the River Clyde, although technically she had been delivered to the Southern Railway on 1 July. In 1941 it was decided to convert Invicta to a Landing Ship, Infantry. The work was carried out by Barclay, Curle & Co Ltd, Elderslie. After conversion, Invicta could carry six LCAs and 250 troops. Invicta was allocated the Code Letters GLJG and the United Kingdom Official Number 167606. Her port of registry was London.

On 3 June 1943 Invicta was commissioned into the Royal Navy as HMS Invicta. She took part in the Dieppe Raid on 19 August 1942, landing soldiers from The South Saskatchewan Regiment on Green Beach. In October 1943 Invicta was assigned to Force J in preparation for Operation Overlord. Her Code Letters were changed to GLJQ at this time. On 6 June 1944 Invicta was part of 510 Flotilla. She carried members of the 7th Canadian Infantry Brigade to Juno Beach, Courseulles-sur-Mer. Amongst those on board Invicta was Richard Pirrie, the first Australian to be killed on D-Day. Also on board was war correspondent Robert Raymond. Invicta was decommissioned on 9 October 1945 and returned to the Southern Railway.

Invicta was refitted ready for service, but she was bareboat chartered by the Government on 26 December 1945 for use as a troopship, repatriating demobilised troops from Calais to Dover. On 27 December she collided with Ben-my-Chree in Dover.

== Civilian service ==
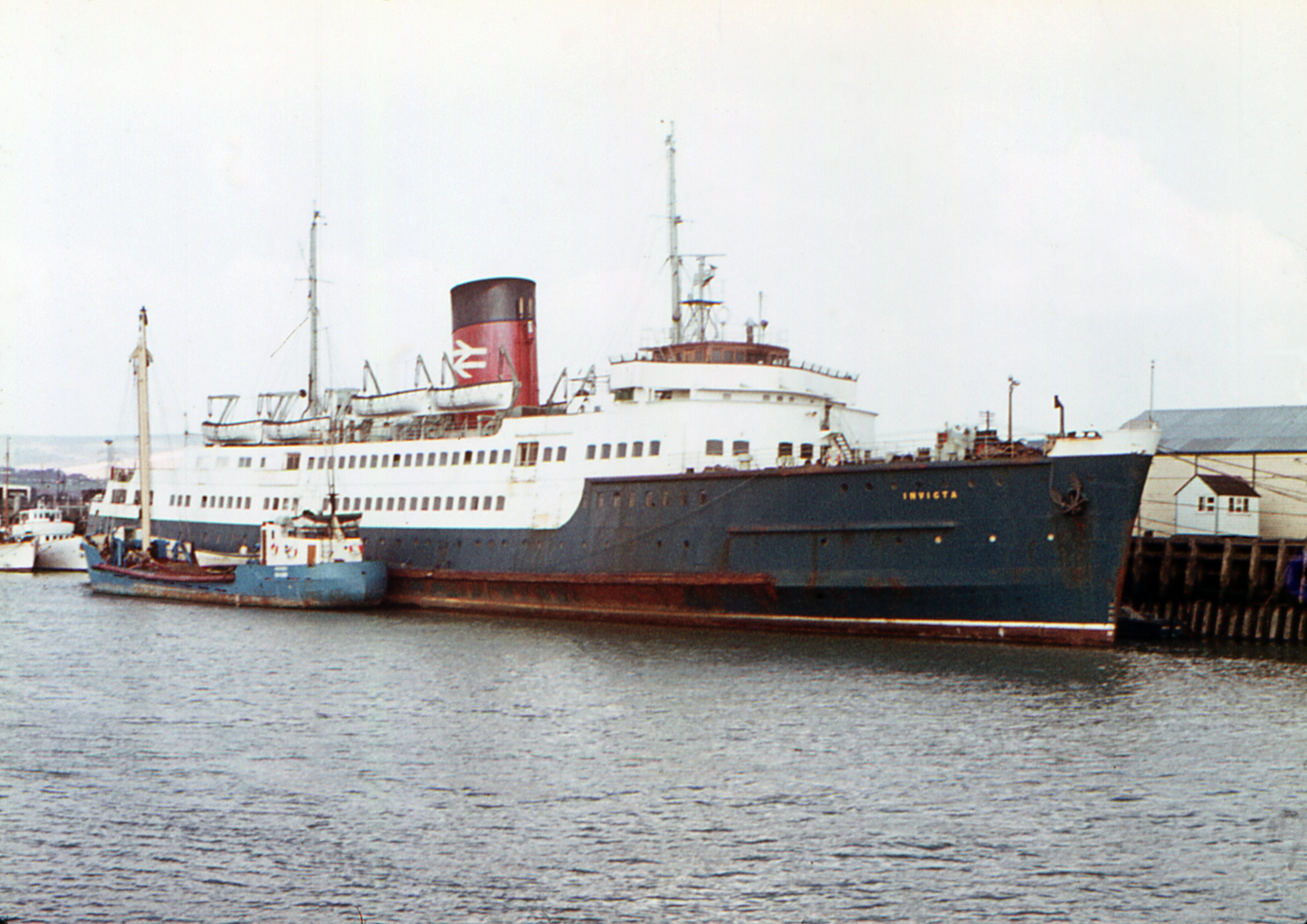
Invicta in Sealink livery at Newhaven, 1971

On 23 April 1946 Invicta left for Walker where she was to be refitted by Vickers-Armstrongs. During the refit, she was converted from coal to oil fuel. Invicta left the River Tyne on 14 October and made her first peacetime crossing of the English Channel the next day, replacing Canterbury on the Dover – Calais route.

In 1947, another refit saw Invicta fitted with stabilisers. These were part of the original design but were omitted to hasten construction. The vessel featured in the Southern Region film Golden Arrow in 1947. On 1 January 1948 ownership of Invicta passed to the British Transport Commission on the Nationalisation of the Railways. She was now operated by British Railways, remaining on the Dover – Calais route. In January 1959 Invicta suffered minor damage in a collision with the pier at Calais. On 1 January 1963 ownership of Invicta passed to the British Railways Board after the dissolution of the British Transport Commission.

On 26 April 1963 Invicta was the first ship to pass through the western entrance of Dover Harbour after the removal of Second World War blockships. Invicta appeared in the comedy film San Ferry Ann, which was released in 1966. In 1967 Invicta was repainted into the new Sealink livery, with a blue hull, white superstructure and red funnel with the double arrow logo. With the introduction of TOPS in 1968, Sealink ships were classed as locomotives for TOPS purposes, being allocated Class 99. On 23 May 1970 Invicta was chartered for a trip to Ostend, Belgium.

With the introduction of TOPS Numbers in 1972, Invicta was allocated 99 010. She made her final revenue-earning voyages on 8 August 1972. She was then laid up at Newhaven, East Sussex pending a sale. Although a Greek company showed interest in buying her, she remained unsold. She was sold to Machinehandel en Scheepssloperij de Koophandel, Rotterdam, the Netherlands and left Newhaven on 21 September under tow from the tug Michel Petersen, bound for Nieuw Lekkerland. Invicta was resold and scrapped at Bruges, Belgium.
