= MV Norfolk Ferry =

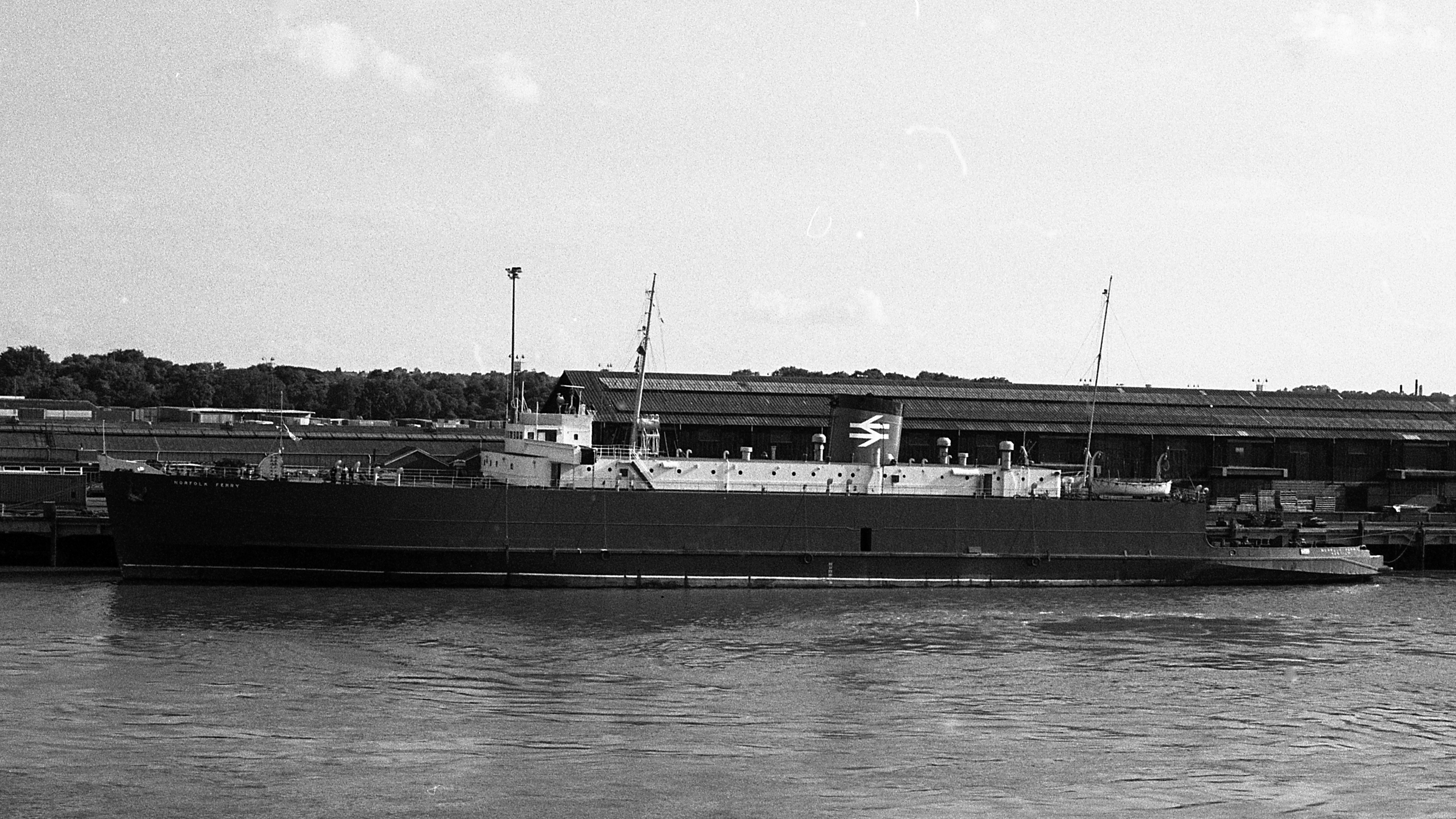
- Norfolk Ferry, Harwich, June 1980

History
- Name: Norfolk Ferry
- Owner: British Transport Commission (1951–62); British Railways Board (1963–73); Passtruck Shipping (1973–79); Sealink (1973–82)
- Operator: British Railways (1951–73); Passtruck Shipping (1973-79); Sealink (1973–82)
- Port of registry: Harwich, United Kingdom
- Route: Harwich – Zeebrugge (1951–67); Harwich–Dunkerque (1967–72); Holyhead–Dublin (1972); Harwich–Zeebrugge (1972–81)
- Builder: John Brown & Company, Clydebank
- Yard number: 661
- Launched: 8 March 1951
- Maiden voyage: 17 July 1951
- Out of service: April 1983
- Identification: United Kingdom Official Number 182204; IMO number: 5255985
- Fate: Scrapped 1983

General characteristics
- Type: Train ferry
- Tonnage: 3,157 GRT, 1,408 NRT, 1,955 DWT
- Length: 399 feet 10 inches (121.87 m)
- Beam: 61 feet 4 inches (18.69 m)
- Draught: 12 feet 0 inches (3.66 m)
- Installed power: 2 x 6-cylinder Sulzer diesel engines, 2,480 bhp.
- Speed: 12.25 knots (22.69 km/h)

Norfolk Ferry was a train ferry built in 1951 by John Brown & Company, Clydebank for British Railways. She served until 1983, when she was scrapped in the Netherlands.

== Description ==
Norfolk Ferry was built by John Brown & Company, Clydebank as yard number 661. She was 399 feet 10 inches (121.87 m) long, with a beam of 61 feet 4 inches (18.69 m) and a draught of 12 feet 0 inches (3.66 m). She was powered by two 6-cylinder Sulzer single action diesel engines with cylinders of 480 millimetres (19 in) stroke by 700 millimetres (28 in) bore, rated at 2,480 bhp. They could propel the ship at 12.25 knots (22.69 km/h). She carried 187 long tons (190 t) of diesel oil. A donkey engine supplied steam at 105 pounds per square inch (7.2 bar). The ship was equipped with three generators supplying 125 kilowatts (168 hp) at 220 volts DC.

== History ==
Norfolk Ferry was launched on 8 March 1951. Her port of registry was Harwich. She was allocated the Official Number 182204. Built for the British Transport Commission and operated by British Railways, she made her maiden voyage on the Harwich–Zeebrugge route on 17 July 1951. On 5 July 1960, Norfolk Ferry rescued the five crew from the German yacht Tagomago, which had been dismasted in the North Sea 30 nautical miles (56 km) off Harwich.

Norfolk Ferry was registered to the British Railways Board on 1 January 1963. In January 1963, she twice returned to Harwich due to a 98 long tons (100 t) casting coming loose. She rescued four people on 20 September 1964 after their yacht capsized 3 nautical miles (5.6 km) off Felixstowe. Norfolk Ferry served on the Harwich–Zeebrugge route until February 1972, when she was put into service on the Harwich–Dunkerque route, having been modified to enable her to use Dunkerque in 1967 and inaugurating the service on 2 October of that year.

With the introduction of IMO numbers in the late 1960s, Norfolk Ferry was allocated the IMO number 5255985. In May 1972, Norfolk Ferry was transferred to the Holyhead–Dublin route for a short time. She was registered to Passtruck (Shipping) Ltd in 1973 and then to Sealink in 1979. Norfolk Ferry was withdrawn from service in August 1981 and then reinstated from September to October, when she was again withdrawn from service and laid up in the River Blackwater. She departed under tow of the Dutch tug Banckert on 14 April 1983 and arrived at Ouwerkerk, Netherlands for scrapping on 17 April 1983.
