= SS Holyhead Ferry I =

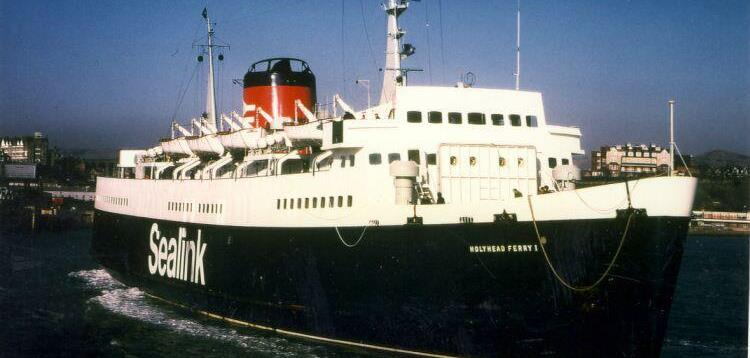
- Holyhead Ferry I in Holyhead

History
- Name: 1965–1976: Holyhead Ferry I; 1976–1981: Earl Leofric
- Operator: 1965–1981: British Railways
- Port of registry: (United Kingdom)
- Builder: Hawthorn Leslie and Company, Hebburn
- Yard number: 757
- Launched: 17 February 1965
- Out of service: 1981
- Identification: IMO number: 6508470
- Fate: Scrapped 1981

General characteristics
- Tonnage: 3,879 gross register tons (GRT)
- Length: 369 feet (112 m)
- Beam: 57.2 feet (17.4 m)
- Draught: 12.8 feet (3.9 m)
- Installed power: 12,000 shp
- Speed: 19.5 knots
- Capacity: 1,000 passengers, 150 cars

TSS Holyhead Ferry I was a passenger vessel built for British Railways in 1965.

== History ==
TSS Holyhead Ferry I was built by Hawthorn Leslie and Company, Hebburn for British Railways for the Irish Sea crossing between Holyhead and Dun Laoghaire and Dublin.

In 1976 she was rebuilt by Swan Hunter on the River Tyne which increased her car capacity from 150 to 205, but reduced the passenger capacity to 725. She was renamed Earl Leofric. In 1979 she fell under the control of the British Railways subsidiary company Sealink UK Ltd.

She was scrapped in June 1981 at San Esteban de Pravia, Spain.
