= MV Stena Nordica =

Seven motor vessels of Stena Line have carried the name Stena Nordica.

- MV Stena Nordica (1965)
- MV Stena Nordica (1969)
- MV Stena Nordica (1973)
- MV Stena Nordica (1974)
- MV Stena Nordica (1975)
- MV Stena Nordica (1979)
- MV Stena Nordica (2000)
