= MV Suffolk Ferry =

Train ferry operating in the UK

History

United Kingdom
- Name: Suffolk Ferry
- Owner: London & North Eastern Railway (1947); British Transport Commission (1948–63); British Railways Board (1963–79); Sealink UK Ltd (1979–80>
- Operator: London & North Eastern Railway (1947); British Railways, Eastern Region (1948–79); Sealink UK Ltd (1979–80)
- Port of registry: Harwich
- Route: Harwich – Zeebrugge
- Builder: John Brown & Co Ltd., Clydebank
- Yard number: 638
- Launched: 7 May 1947
- Completed: August 1947
- In service: August 1947
- Out of service: September 1980
- Identification: IMO number: 5343160
- Fate: Scrapped April 1991

General characteristics
- Class & type: Train ferry
- Tonnage: 3,138 GRT; 1,979 DWT
- Length: 404 feet 6 inches (123.29 m)
- Beam: 61 feet (18.59 m)
- Draught: 12 feet 1 inch (3.68 m)
- Installed power: 2,680 bhp
- Propulsion: 2 x Sulzer diesel engines
- Speed: 13 knots (24 km/h)
- Capacity: 35 railway wagons; 12 passengers

Suffolk Ferry was a train ferry built for the London and North Eastern Railway in 1947. She was subsequently operated by British Railways and Sealink before being withdrawn in 1980 and scrapped in Belgium in 1981.

== Description ==
Suffolk Ferry was built by John Brown & Co, Ltd, Clydebank, Dunbartonshire. She was yard number 638. Suffolk Ferry was 404 feet 6 inches (123.29 m) long, with a beam of 61 feet 6 inches (18.75 m), with a draught of 12 feet 1 inch (3.68 m). Registered at 3,134 GRT, 1,979 DWT, She was powered by two 6-cylinder Sulzer single action diesel engines with cylinders of 480 millimetres (19 in) stroke by 700 millimetres (28 in) bore, rated at 2,680 bhp. They could propel the ship at 13 knots (24 km/h). She could carry 35 railway wagons and twelve passengers.

== Service ==
Suffolk Ferry was the first diesel powered ship built for the London and North Eastern Railway. Registered at Harwich, she usually operated on the Harwich – Zeebrugge route, the crossing taking nine hours. Suffolk Ferry entered service in August 1947. With the nationalisation of the railways in the United Kingdom in 1948, ownership of Suffolk Ferry passed to the British Transport Commission.

On 2 January 1956, the Liberian tanker Melody ran aground off Vlissingen, Zeeland, Netherlands. Suffolk Ferry was one of three vessels which went to the assistance of Melody.

On 6 May 1961, Suffolk Ferry rescued all four people from the British yacht Sugar Creek in the North Sea off the Cork Lightship.

On 16 December 1962, Suffolk Ferry reported to Ostend Radio that the Offshore radio ship Uilenspiegel, home of Radio Antwerpen, was adrift and sinking. Suffolk Ferry remained alongside Uilenspiegel until a lifeboat arrived. Uilenspiegel subsequently beached at Cadzand.

In 1963, ownership passed to the British Railways Board. On 8 October 1965, Suffolk Ferry rescued nine of the thirteen crew of the German coastal tanker Unkas, which had collided with the Swedish cargo ship Marieholm in the North Sea 35 nautical miles (65 km) off the coast of the Netherlands. Unkas was later towed in to Rotterdam.

With the introduction of IMO numbers in the late 1960s, Suffolk Ferry was allocated the IMO Number 5343160. Ownership passed to the British Rail subsidiary Sealink in 1979. She was withdrawn from service in September 1980. Suffolk Ferry was towed to Antwerp, Belgium on 25 November 1980. She was scrapped at Burcht, Antwerp in April 1981.
