= MV Transcontainer I =

History
- Name: Transcontainer I (1968–91); Nour I (1991–95); Niobe I (1995–2000)
- Owner: SNCF (1968–86); Pireo Cia. Nav. (1986–91); Corporation Transport SA (1991–95); Kassimeris Arab Bridge (1995); Rainbow Lines (1995–98 or later)
- Operator: SNCF (1969–86); Pireo Cia. Nav. (1986–91); Corporation Transport SA (1991–95); Seatower Shipping Co Ltd (1995); Rainbow Lines (1995–98); Ikaria Lines (1998– )
- Port of registry: Dunkerque, France (1968–74); (France) Dieppe (1974–91); Piraeus, Greece (1991–95); Panama (1995–2000)
- Route: see text
- Builder: Constructions Navales et Industrielles de la Méditerranée
- Yard number: 1381
- Launched: 30 November 1968
- Completed: February 1969
- Maiden voyage: 11 March 1969 (planned); 13 March 1969 (actual)
- Identification: IMO number: 6904478; Call sign FNZN (1968–91); Call sign 3ETZ8 (1991–2000)
- Fate: Scrapped 2000

General characteristics
- Type: Freight ferry (1968–74); Train ferry (1974–91>; Passenger ferry (1991–2000)
- Tonnage: 2,760 GRT (1968–91), 2,289 GT (1991–2000), 1,829 NRT (1968–91), 759 DWT
- Length: 104.20 metres (341 ft 10 in)
- Beam: 18.70 metres (61 ft 4 in)
- Draught: 5.20 metres (17 ft 1 in)
- Installed power: 2 diesel engines 3,236 kilowatts (4,340 hp)
- Speed: 16.0 knots (29.6 km/h)
- Capacity: 36 passengers (1968–91); 1,000 passengers (1991–2000)

Transcontainer I was built in 1968 for SNCF as a combined ro-ro ferry and container ship. She was converted to a train ferry in 1974. The ship was sold in 1991 to a Panamanian company and renamed Nour I. A further sale in 1995 saw her renamed Niobe I. She served until scrapped in India in 2000.

== Description ==
The ship was 104.20 metres (341 ft 10 in) long, with a beam of 18.70 metres (61 ft 4 in) and a draught of 5.20 metres (17 ft 1 in). She was propelled by two MWM diesel engines producing 3,236 kilowatts (4,340 hp). These could propel the ship at 16.0 knots (29.6 km/h). As built, she was assessed as 2,760 GRT, 1,829 NRT (1968–91), 759 DWT. The ship had accommodation for 36 passengers.

== History ==
Transcontainer I was built by Constructions Navales et Industrielles de la Méditerranée, La Seyne-sur-Mer, France as Yard Number 1381 for SNCF. She was launched on 30 November 1968 and was delivered in February 1969. Her port of registry was Dunkerque and the IMO number 6904478 was allocated. She was allocated the call sign FNZN.

Built as a combined RO-RO ferry and container ship, Transcontainer I entered service on the Dunkerque– Harwich route on 13 March 1969, her planned maiden voyage on 11 March having been cancelled due to industrial action. In 1974, she was converted to a train ferry and was delivered back to SNCF on 24 October. Her port of registry was changed to Dieppe. From November 1974 to January 1975 she operated the Calais–Dover route. On 9 January 1975, the day after she returned to the Dunkerque–Harwich route, Transcontainer I collided with Stena Nordica off Felixstowe, United Kingdom. She was repaired at Dunkerque and returned to service in April 1975. From March to October 1985, she operated the Dieppe–Portsmouth route. Transcontainer I operated the Dunkerque–Dover route between February and July 1986.

Transcontainer I was the sold to Pireo Navigation of Piraeus, Greece'. From 1987 to 1991 she operated the Piraeus–Ravenna route. In 1991, Transcontainer I was sold to Tran Corporation, Panama, and was rebuilt as a passenger ferry, with accommodation for 1,000 passengers. She was renamed Nour I and placed in service on the Aqaba–Nuwaiba route. Her DWT was now 2,289 and her call sign was changed to 3ETZ8. In 1995, Nour I was sold to Kassimeris Arab Bridge, Panama and was renamed Niobe I. She operated under the management of Seatower Shipping of Panama. In December 1995, she was sold to Rainbow Lines and was rebuilt at Perama, Greece.

Niobe I operated on the Otranto–Durrës route in 1996, and was then placed on the Brindisi–Durrës–Igoumenitsa route in 1997 before being laid up at Igoumenitsa. In 1998, she was operated by Ikaria Lines on the Brindisi–Otranto–Vlorë route. Subsequent to this service, Niobe I was sold to Cascade Navigation of Panama. She arrived at Alang, India on 27 December 2000 for scrapping.
