= MV Essex Ferry =

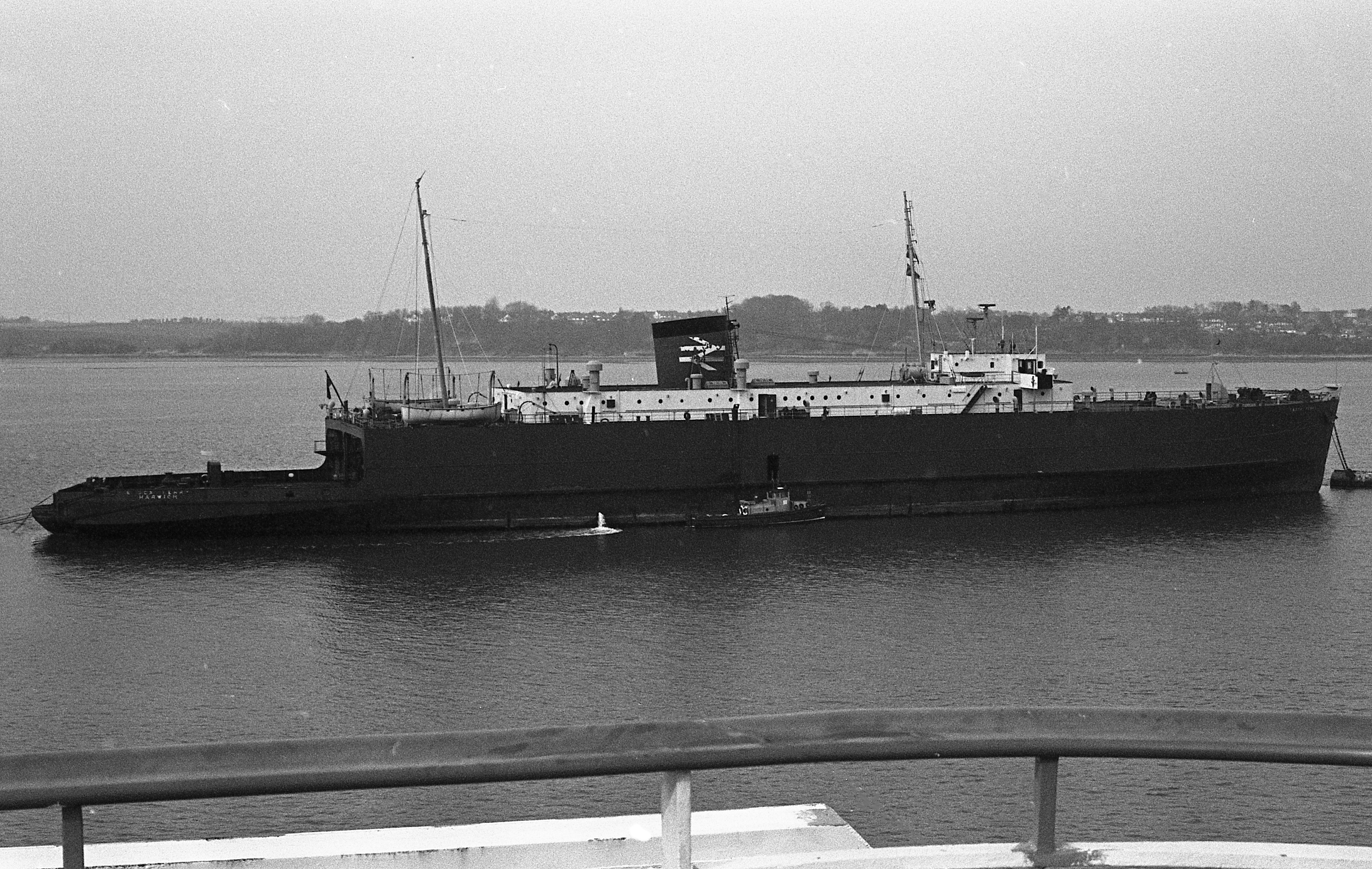
- Essex Ferry, Harwich Harbour, 10th April 1980

History
- Name: Essex Ferry (1955–83); Essex Ferry Pontoon (1983)
- Owner: British Transport Commission
- Operator: British Rail (1957–73); Sealink (1973–83)
- Port of registry: (United Kingdom) Harwich, England
- Route: Harwich – Zeebrugge
- Builder: John Brown & Company, Clydebank
- Yard number: 694
- Launched: 24 October 1955
- Completed: January 1957
- Maiden voyage: 15 January 1957
- Out of service: 1981
- Identification: United Kingdom Official Number 185600; IMO number: 5106693; British Rail 99003
- Fate: Scrapped 1983

General characteristics
- Type: Train ferry
- Tonnage: 3,242 GRT, 1,988 DWT
- Length: 399 feet 10 inches (121.87 m)
- Beam: 61 feet 4 inches (18.69 m)
- Draught: 12 feet 0.75 inches (3.68 m)
- Installed power: 2 x 6-cylinder Sulzer diesel engines, 2,480 bhp
- Speed: 12.25 knots (22.69 km/h)
- Capacity: 38 railway wagons, 12 passengers

Essex Ferry was a 3,242 GRT train ferry built in 1956 by John Brown & Company for British Railways. She served until 1981 when she was laid up. In 1983, she was reduced to a floating pontoon and used in the salvage of the semi-submersible drilling rig Alexander L. Kielland before being scrapped later that year.

== Description ==
Essex Ferry was built by John Brown & Company, Clydebank as yard number 694. She was 399 feet 10 inches (121.87 m) long, with a beam of 61 feet 4 inches (18.69 m) and a draught of 12 feet 0.75 inches (3.68 m). She was powered by two 6-cylinder Sulzer single action diesel engines with cylinders of 480 millimetres (19 in) stroke by 700 millimetres (28 in) bore, rated at 2,680 bhp. They could propel the ship at 12.25 knots (22.69 km/h). She was assessed at 3,242 GRT, 1,988 DWT.

== History ==
Essex Ferry was launched on 24 October 1955. She was allocated the Official Number 185600. Completed in January 1957, she made her maiden voyage from Harwich to Zeebrugge, Belgium on 15 January. With the introduction of IMO Numbers in the late 1960s, Essex Ferry was allocated the IMO Number 5106693. She could carry 38 railway wagons and had accommodation for twelve passengers. She mainly served on the Harwich to Zeebrugge route, with a short spell of service in May 1972 on the Holyhead to Dublin route. Towards the end of her service she was transferred to the Harwich - Dunkerque route.

Essex Ferry was withdrawn from service in 1981 and laid up at Harwich. In 1983, Essex Ferry was sold to Medway Secondary Metals for breaking, departing under tow for Rainham, Kent on 27 April 1983 and arriving two days later. She was initially reduced to deck level and renamed Essex Ferry Pontoon. She was used in the salvage of the Norwegian semi-submersible drilling rig Alexander L. Kielland which had capsized in March 1980. Following this work, she was scrapped.
