= Sealink =

Former ferry company in the United Kingdom

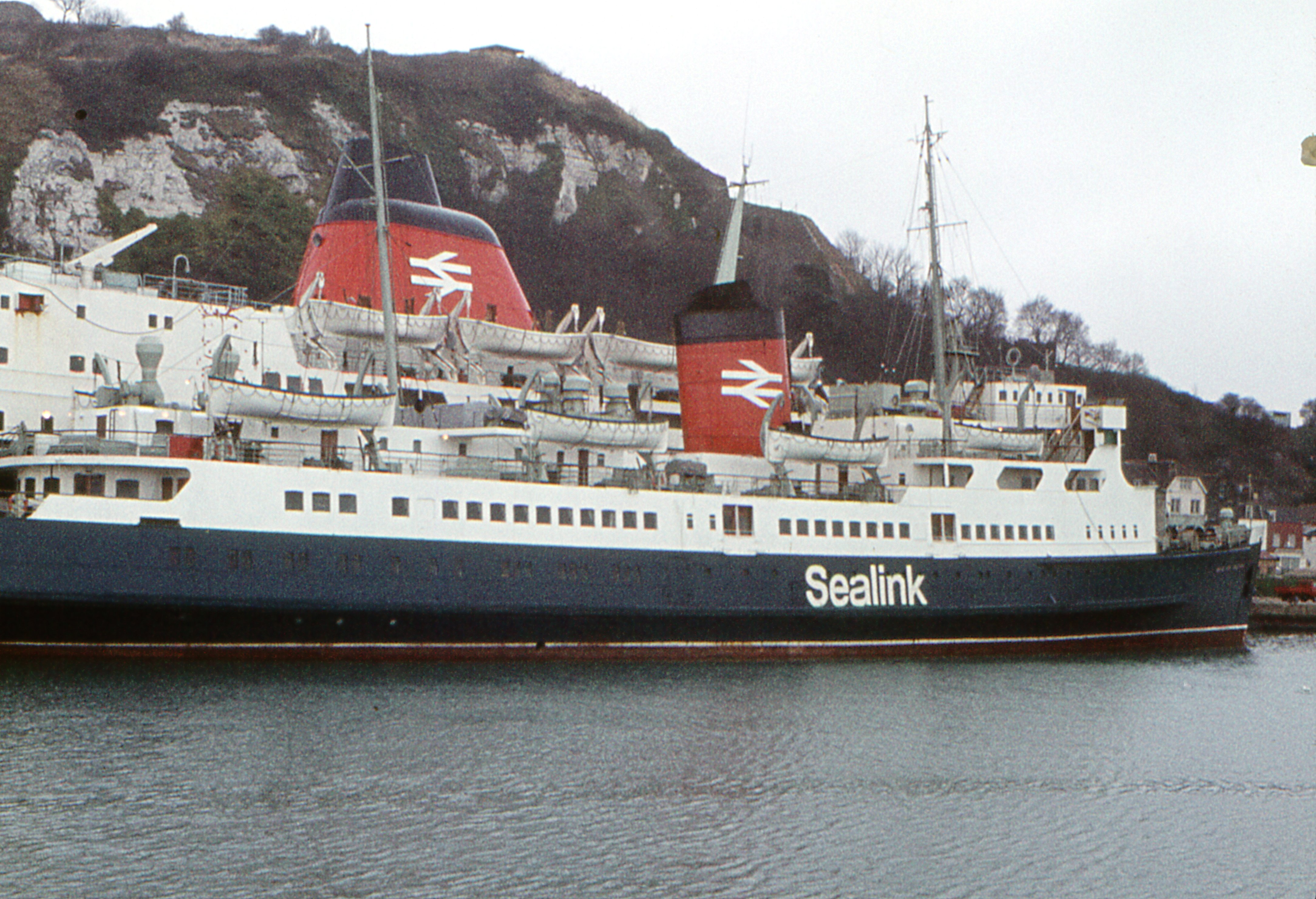
- Sealink ferries Horsa and Maid of Orleans, Dover, 1973
- Genre: Ferry company
- Founded: 1970
- Founder: British Rail
- Defunct: 1984
- Fate: Privatised
- Successor: Sealink British Ferries (1984); Sealink Stena Line (1991); Stena Sealink Line (1992); Stena Line (1996)
- Area served: Great Britain, Ireland, Belgium, Channel Islands, Isle of Wight, France
- Services: Passenger, car and coach transportation, freight transportation
- Owner: British Rail

Sealink was a ferry company based in Great Britain from 1970 to 1984, operating services to France, Belgium, the Netherlands, the Isle of Man, the Channel Islands, the Isle of Wight and Ireland.

Ports served by the company included: Dover, Folkestone, Newhaven, Southampton and Harwich for services to the European continent; Holyhead, Fishguard, Heysham and Stranraer for services to the Republic of Ireland, Northern Ireland and the Isle of Man; Weymouth and Portsmouth for services to the Channel Islands. The Isle of Wight was also served from Portsmouth and Lymington.

Sealink also operated the Steamer passenger ferry services on Windermere in Cumbria until privatisation, when these were passed to the newly reformed Windermere Iron Steamboat Company (now Windermere Lake Cruises Ltd).

== History ==
Sealink was originally the brand name for the ferry services of British Rail in the United Kingdom and Ireland. Services to France, Belgium and the Netherlands were run by Sealink UK as part of the Sealink consortium which also used ferries owned by French national railways (SNCF), the Belgian Maritime Transport Authority Regie voor Maritiem Transport/Regie des transports maritimes (RMT/RTM) and the Dutch Stoomvaart Maatschappij Zeeland (Zeeland Steamship Company).

Historically, the shipping services were exclusively an extension of the railways across the English Channel and the Irish Sea in order to provide through, integrated services to Europe and Ireland. As international travel became more popular in the late 1960s and before air travel became generally affordable, the responsibility for shipping services was taken away from the British Rail Regions and in 1969 centralised in a new division – British Rail Shipping and International Services Division.

With the advent of car ferry services, the old passenger-only ferries were gradually replaced by roll-on/roll-off ships, catering for motorists and rail passengers as well as road freight. However, given that there was now competition in the form of other ferry companies offering crossings to motorists, it became necessary to market the services in a normal business fashion (as opposed to the previous almost monopolistic situation). Thus, with the other partners mentioned above, the brand name Sealink was introduced for the consortium.

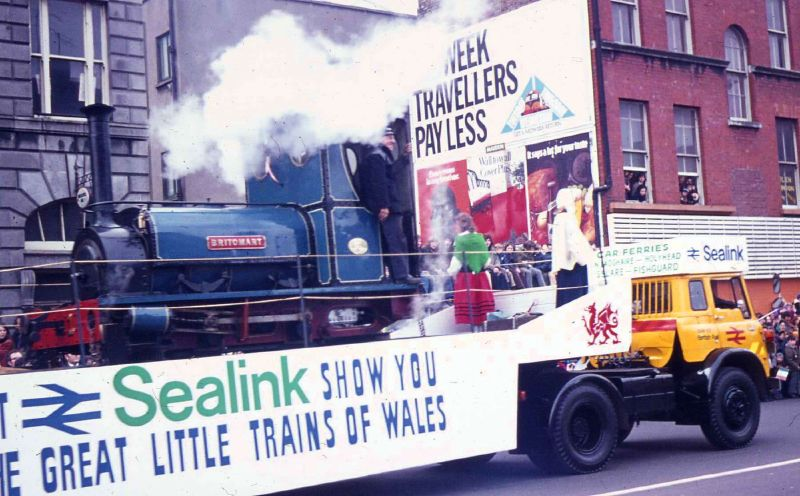
Ffestiniog Railway locomotive Britomart being hauled by a British Rail Bedford TK tractor unit, with a Sealink promotion of the Great Little Trains of Wales, during the St Patrick's Day Parade in 1974 in Dublin.

In November 1970, Belgium Marine joined the Sealink consortium with five car ferries and six passenger ships.

As demand for international rail travel declined and the shipping business became almost exclusively dependent on passenger and freight vehicle traffic, the ferry business was incorporated as Sealink UK Limited on 1 January 1979, a wholly owned subsidiary of the British Railways Board (BRB), but still part of the Sealink consortium. In 1979, Sealink acquired Manx Line which offered services to the Isle of Man from Heysham.

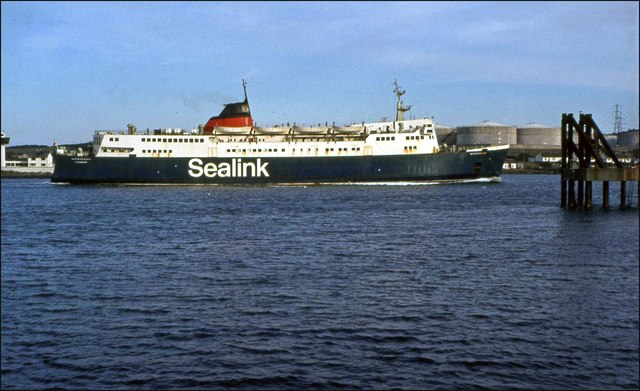
The Antrim Princess in Larne with Sealink in large letters

On 27 July 1984 the UK Government sold Sealink UK Limited to Sea Containers for £66m. The company was renamed Sealink British Ferries. In 1991, Sea Containers sold Sealink British Ferries to Stena Line. The sale excluded the operations of Hoverspeed, the Isle of Wight services and the share in the Isle of Man Steam Packet Company, as well as the Port of Heysham. The new owners rebranded the company as Sealink Stena Line, then again a few years later to Stena Sealink Line.

In 1996, the Sealink name disappeared when the UK services were re-branded as Stena Line. The agreement with the SNCF on the Dover to Calais route also ended at this time and the French-run Sealink services were rebranded as SeaFrance.

== Livery ==
Sealink house flag

Prior to 1964/65, the colours were black hull, white upperworks and black-topped buff funnel.

From 1972/73, Sealink was displayed in white Rail Alphabet typeface on the side of the hull.

The livery from 1984 to 1995 was a distinctive blue-on-white. Previously, the British Rail double arrow logo had been used, with a BR corporate monastral blue hull, white upperworks and black-topped red funnel.

A reversed version of the BR symbol was used on one side of Sealink ship's funnels and flags. This was so that the 'top' arrow was always pointing towards the bow of the ship on funnels, and for flags towards the flag staff.

== Hovercraft ==
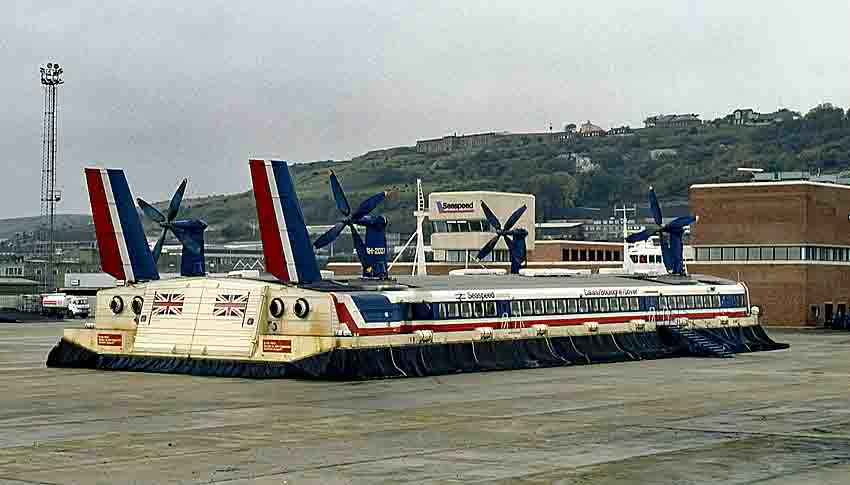
Seaspeed SRN4 The Princess Anne at Dover

In the 1960s, British Rail started hovercraft services from Dover to Calais and Boulogne-sur-Mer, and also across the Solent to the Isle of Wight. Rather than use the name Sealink, the services were marketed as Seaspeed and Solent Seaspeed. Seaspeed merged with rival Hoverlloyd in 1981 to form Hoverspeed.

== See also ==
- British Railways ships
