= Dutchflyer =

Rail-sea-rail service between Netherlands and the UK

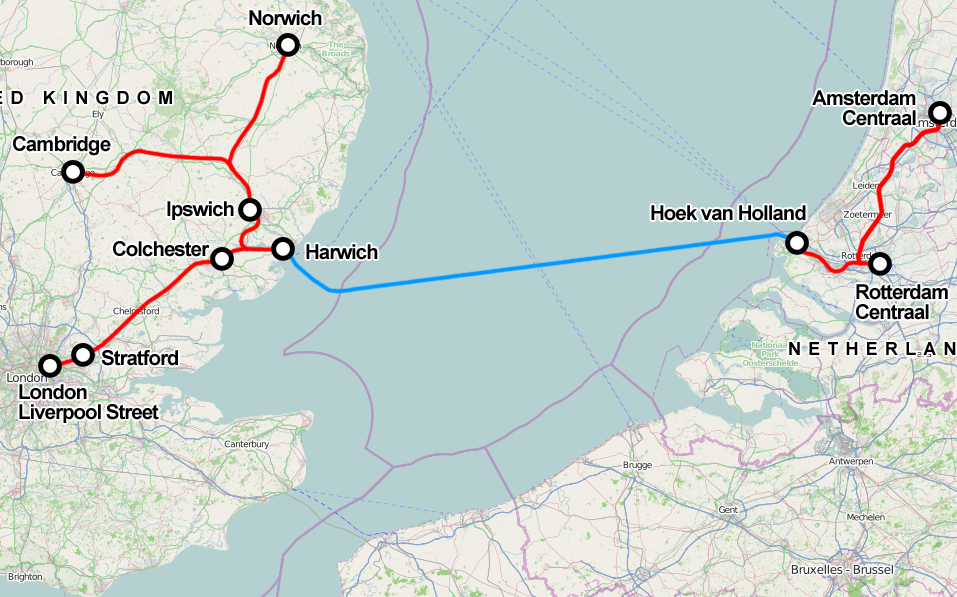
- Map of the Dutch Flyer rail & sea route over the North Sea
- Main region(s): London, East Anglia, South Holland, North Holland
- Parent company: Greater Anglia; Nederlandse Spoorwegen; Rotterdamse Elektrische Tram; Stena Line

Other
- Website: www.stenaline.co.uk/ferry-to-holland/rail-and-sail

Dutchflyer is an integrated passenger service between the United Kingdom and the Netherlands. Formerly known as Amsterdam Express, Dutchflyer is a rail/sea/rail service operated jointly by Stena Line, the Dutch state railway operator Nederlandse Spoorwegen, Greater Anglia, and the Rotterdam metro and bus company Rotterdamse Elektrische Tram.

== History ==
The Dutchflyer service is a successor to former boat trains such as the London & North Eastern Railway (LNER) Hook Continental service, which operated between London and the Netherlands from 1927 to 1987.

Originally, the Dutchflyer brand was only used to market the service to passengers starting in the UK, while in the Netherlands the service was advertised as "GoLondon". Nowadays the Dutchflyer brand is not used as prominently and the service is sold through the Dutch Stena Line website.

== Booking ==
The Dutchflyer service lets passengers travel from any UK railway station served by Greater Anglia to Harwich International (formerly Parkeston Quay), and then cross the North Sea by Stena Line ferry. Before March 2022, the ticket also included the journey after arrival at Hoek van Holland Haven to any station in the Netherlands (or in the reverse direction): since then, the ticket for the Dutch rail portion has to be purchased separately.

== Train services ==
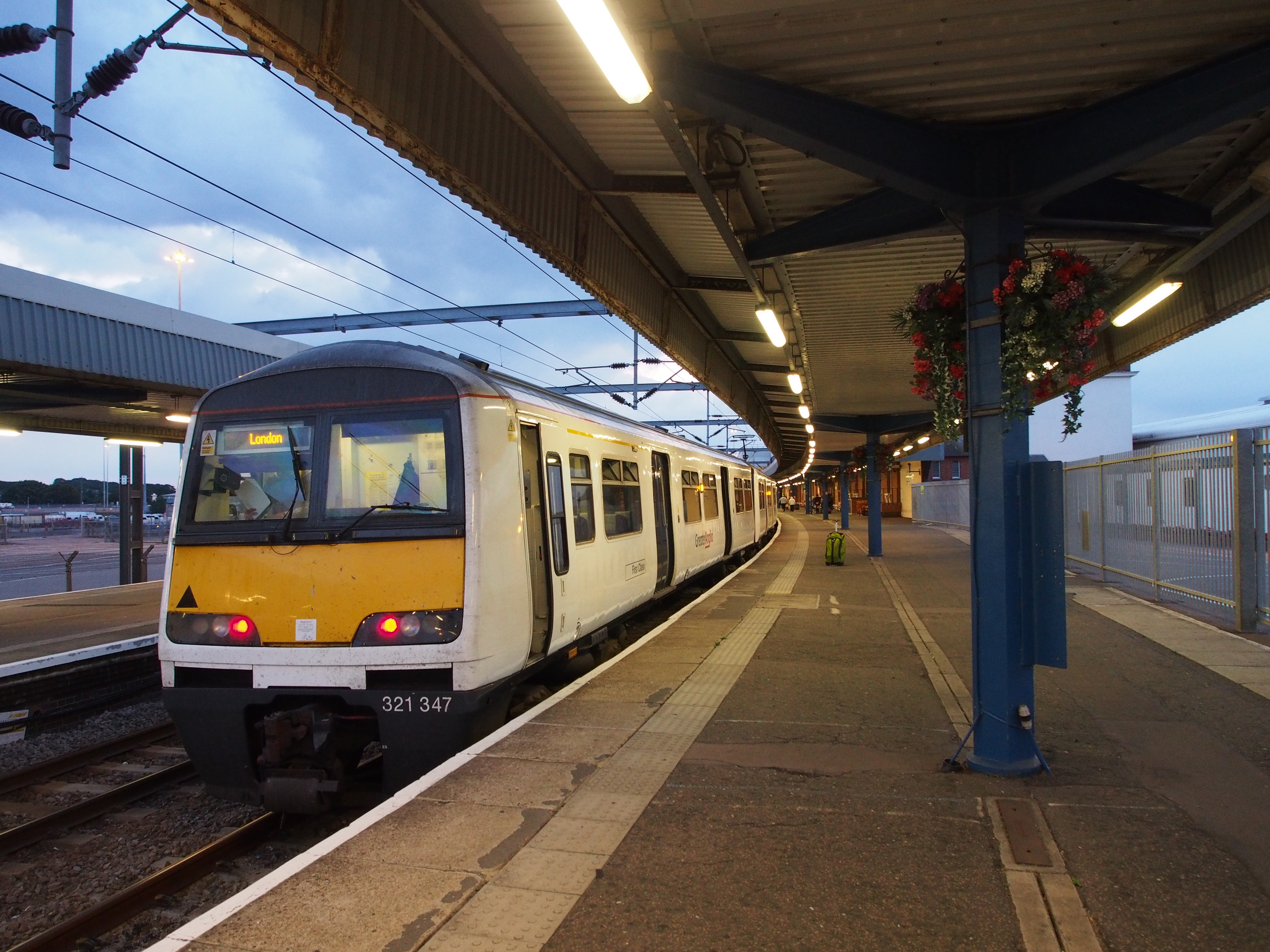
A Greater Anglia British Rail Class 321 at Harwich International station

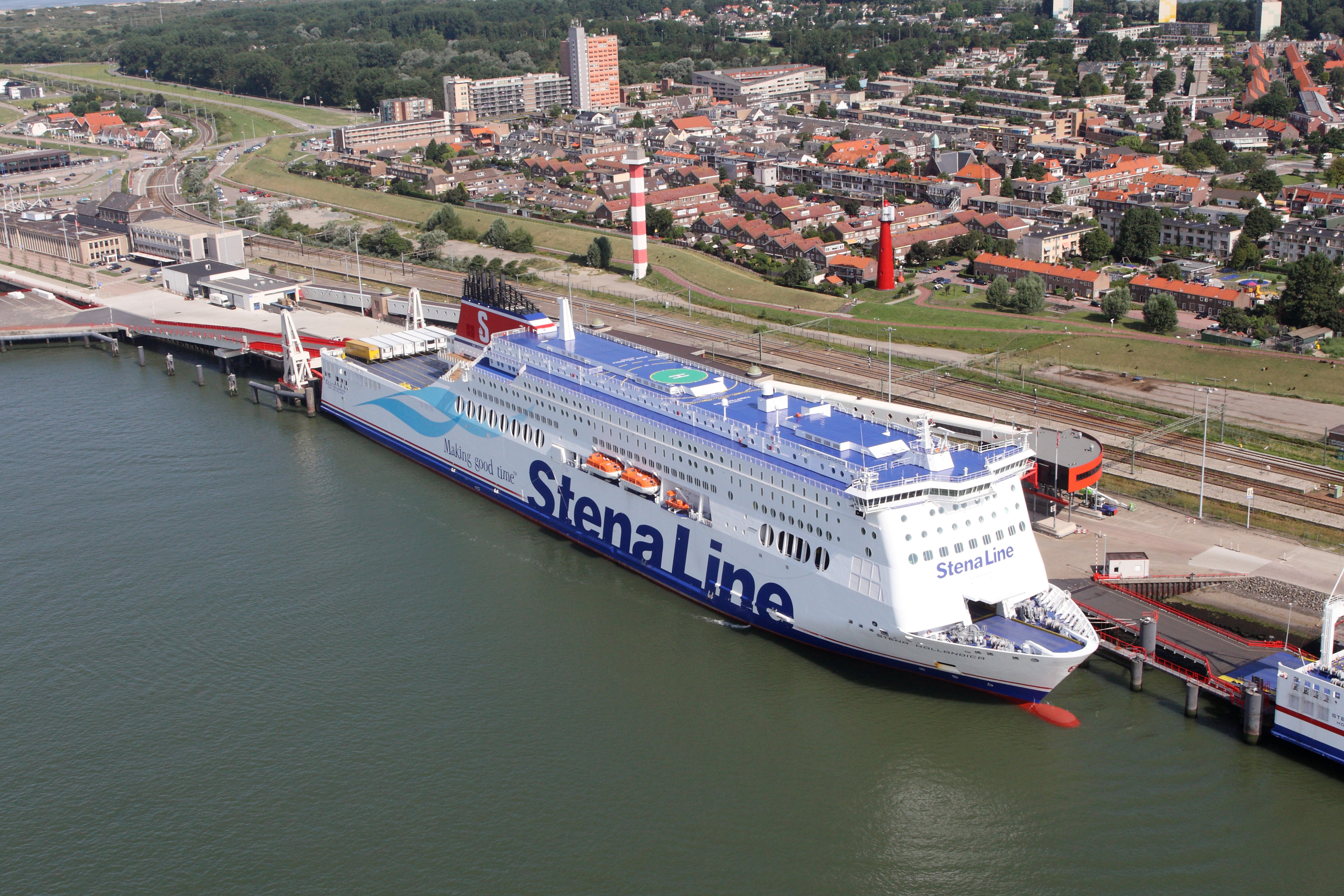
The Stena Hollandica ferry at Hook of Holland

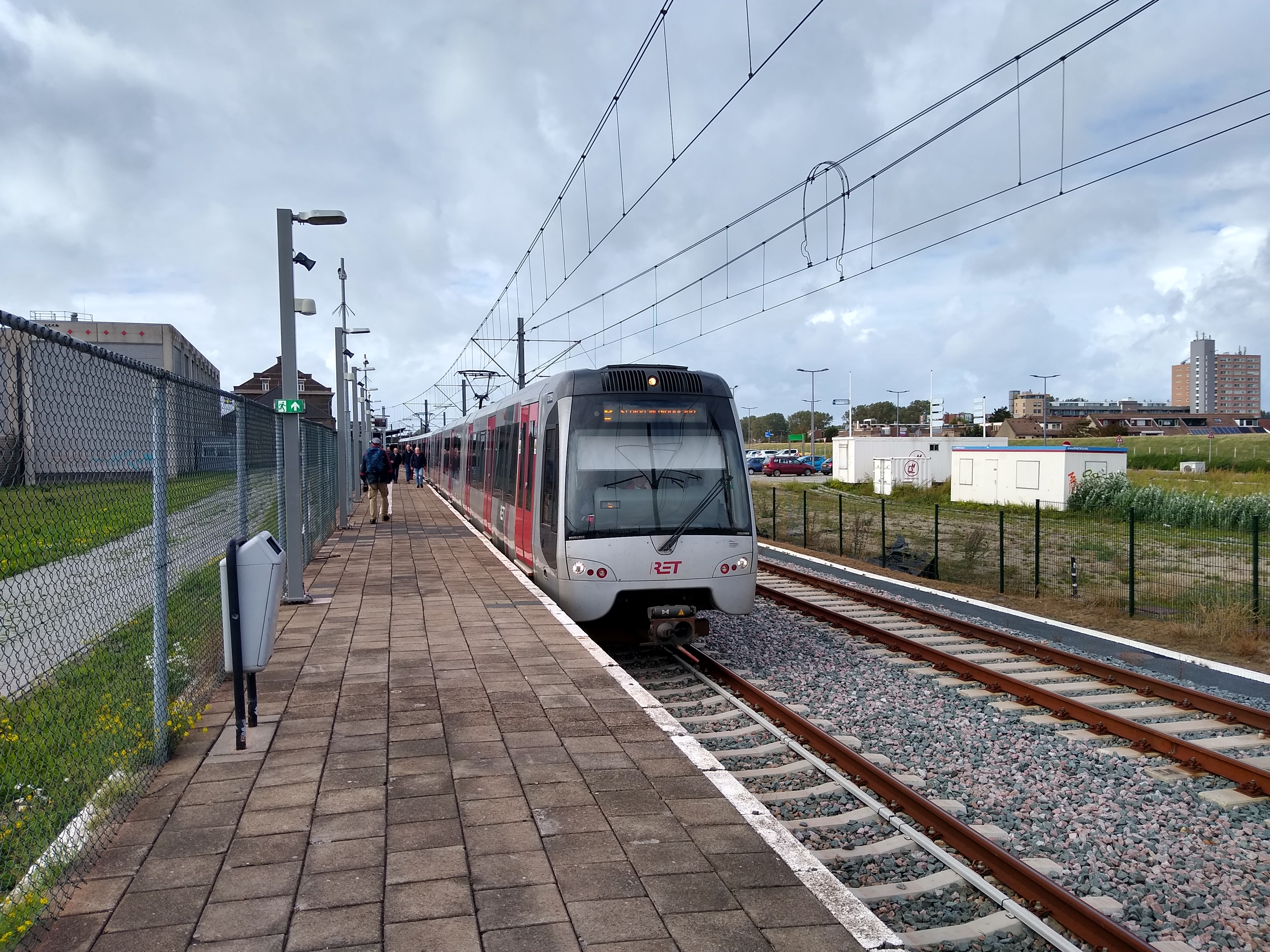
A Rotterdam Metro train at Hoek van Holland Haven station

Trains to and from London and Cambridge are timed to meet the ferry.

After arriving in Hook of Holland (Hoek van Holland), passengers disembark across from the station of the Rotterdam Metro, slightly moved from the historical railway station. The metro connects to train stations at Schiedam Centrum railway station, Rotterdam Blaak railway station, and Rotterdam Alexander railway station, all of which feature intercity services to many destinations in the Netherlands. An example is shown in this table for a connection by metro from Hook of Holland to Schiedam and then to The Hague or Amsterdam, or stations in between.

Operator	Train Type	Route	Rolling Stock	Frequency
Greater Anglia	Local train	Manningtree – Harwich International	Class 720	1 per hour
Greater Anglia	Boat train	London Liverpool Street – Harwich International	Class 720	4 per day
Greater Anglia	Boat train	Cambridge/Lowestoft – Harwich International	Class 755	2 per day
Stena Line	Ship	Harwich International harbour – Hook of Holland harbour	Stena Hollandica; Stena Britannica	2 per day
Rotterdam Metro Line B	Metro	Hoek van Holland Haven – Schiedam Centrum	Bombardier Flexity Swift	3 per hour
Nederlandse Spoorwegen	Intercity	Schiedam Centrum – Den Haag Hollands Spoor - Amsterdam Centraal	VIRM	4 per hour

== See also ==
- Admiraal de Ruijter (London–Amsterdam, 1987–?)
- Benjamin Britten (London–Amsterdam, 1987–?)
- Eurostar (London–Paris; London–Amsterdam)
  - Regional Eurostar (Glasgow/Manchester–Paris, proposed)
- The Golden Arrow - London–Calais (1929–1972)
- Night Ferry (London–Paris/Brussels, 1936–1980)
- Venice-Simplon Orient Express (London–Paris–Rome)
