= Aqua Myth =

Scrapped ferry

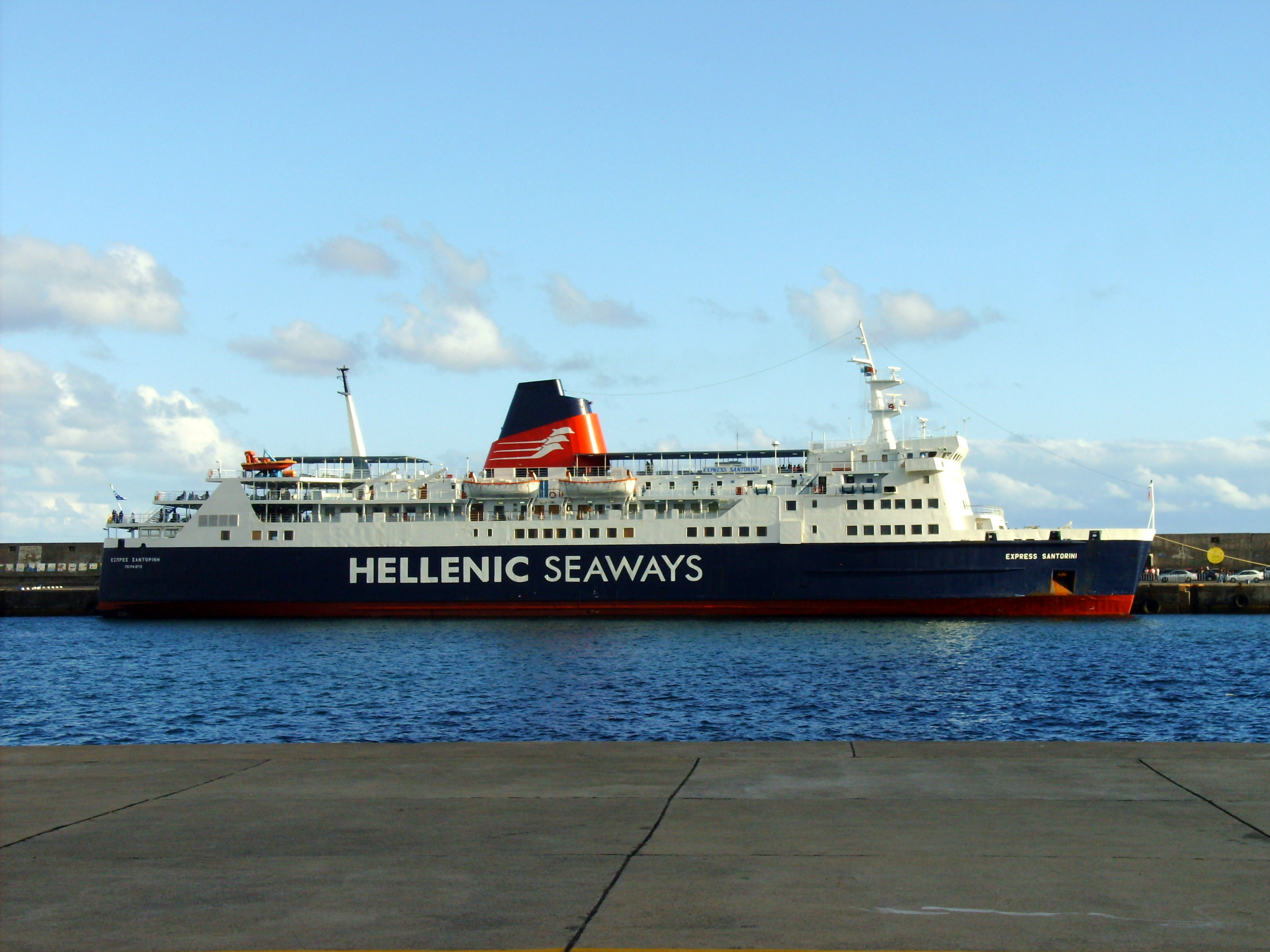
- Express Santorini at dock in Ponta Delgada in 2008.

History
- Name: Chartres (1973–1993); Express Santorini (1993–2016); Al Salmy 4 (2016–2021); Aqua Myth (2021–2022); Myth (2022)
- Owner: SNCF (1973–1993); Agapitos Express Ferries (1993–1999); Minoan Flying Dolphins (1999–2005); Hellenic Seaways (2005–2014); Portucalence Shipping (2014–2016); SAMC (2016–2021); Seajets (2021–2022)
- Operator: SNCF (1974–1990); French Government (1990–1991); Angleterre-Lorraine-Alsace (1991–1993); Agapitos Express Ferries (1993–1999); Hellas Ferries (1999–2005); Hellenic Seaways (2005–2007); Atlânticoline (various charters from 2007–2016); SAMC (2016–2021)
- Port of registry: Calais, France (1974–1993); Piraeus, Greece (1993–2016); (United Arab Emirates) Dubai, UAE (2016–2021); Moroni, Comoros (2021–2022)
- Builder: Chantiers Dubigeon S.A.
- Yard number: 137
- Launched: 12 September 1973
- Christened: 6 March 1974
- Completed: January 1974
- Maiden voyage: 1974
- In service: 25 February 1974
- Out of service: February 2022
- Identification: IMO number: 7330040
- Fate: Scrapped, at Alang, India, in 2022.

General characteristics
- Type: RO-RO/Passenger ship
- Tonnage: 4,590 GRT as built, 7,821 GT, 1,189 DWT
- Length: 115.40 m (378 ft 7 in)
- Beam: 19.23 m (63 ft 1 in)
- Draught: 4.19 m (13 ft 9 in)
- Decks: 350 m (1,150 ft)
- Installed power: 2 SEMT Pielstick 16-cylinder diesel engines 11,768 kW (15,781 hp)
- Speed: 18.5 knots (34.3 km/h; 21.3 mph)
- Capacity: 1,707 passengers; 260 vehicles

Aqua Myth was a former train ferry, converted to RO-RO/passenger ferry. Built in 1974 as the Chartres for SNCF. Chartered by the French Government during the First Gulf War, she was sold in 1993 to Agapitos Express Ferries and renamed Express Santorini. Sold to Minoan Flying Dolphins in 1999, and then transferred to Hellenic Seaways in 2005, the ship operated charters from 2007 to 2014 within the Portuguese archipelago of the Azores with Atlântico Line. She was sold to Portucalence Shipping in 2014, and then was sold to Emirati company SAMC in 2016, taking the name Al Salmy 4. In 2021 she was sold to Seajets as Aqua Myth.

== History ==
=== Chartres ===
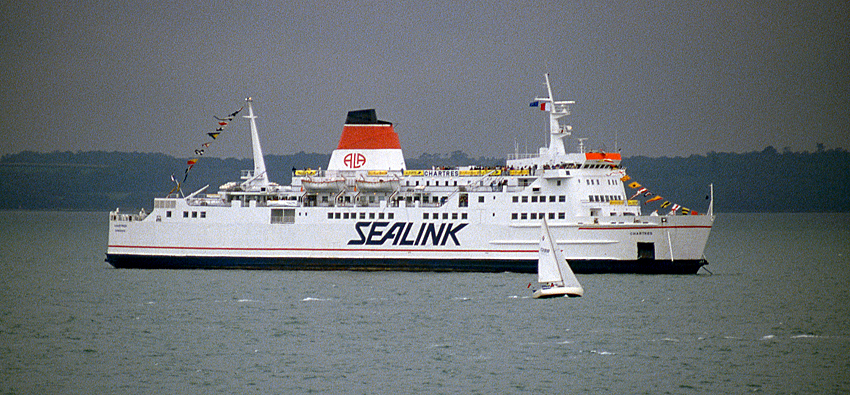
Chartres train ferry in the Solent

The Chartres was one of three Sealink multipurpose train ferries built in the early 1970s, complementing the British Rail's Vortigern and the Saint Eloi of Sealink UK's French subsidiary ALA. The Chartres was built in Nantes by Dubigeon-Normandie S.A. (later Chantiers Dubigeon S.A.) in 1974 for SNCF (French Railways) operations between Dover-Dunkerque and passenger service between Dover-Calais. Although the three ships were similar, there were small structural differences that included size of windows and design of funnels.

The Chartres was delivered to SNCF on 9 January 1974 and visited Boulogne, Calais and Dunkerque on 15 February. Chartres entered service on the Dunkerque-Dover route on 25 February. She was christened at Calais on 6 March 1973.

Launched on 12 September 1973, the Chartres briefly operated train ferry operations and was quickly transferred to Dieppe. From 1973, Chartres operated as a car and passenger ferry on the Boulogne-Dover and Calais-Dover routes during the summer; and as a train ferry on the Dunkerque-Dover route during the winter. In 1975–76, she was operated on the Dieppe-Newhaven routes between 1983 and 1990.

She continued to service the English Channel until the summer of 1990, along the Dover-Calais route, on behalf of ALA from her berth at Dover's Western Docks. She replaced the Saint Eloi (which had been rechristened the Channel Entente) when the latter was sold to the Isle of Man Steam Packet Company. In this role she operated cross-channel passenger service until the end of the 1993 season. Following the opening of the Channel Tunnel train ferry service ceased from the Dover Western Docks and Nord pas-de-Calais ceased, and she began to operate passenger traffic. Chartres collided with the Calais pilot boat Louis Magniez in 1978.

Chartres operated on the Dieppe - Newhaven route from 29 May 1982. She was placed into service on the Dunkerque - Dover route in 1986 and again in 1988. On 25 January 1990, Chartres collided with the breakwater at Dieppe and was severely damaged. She was repaired at Rouen and re-entered service on 3 June on the Calais - Dover route. Due to a blockade of Calais later that month, Chartres operated on the Boulogne - Dover route before spending the last week of June on the Zeebrugge - Dover route. In October, she was switched to the Boulogne - Folkestone route. Chartres was chartered by the French Government in December for use as a troopship during the First Gulf War. She operated between Toulon and Yanbu, Saudi Arabia until June 1991. On return from trooping duties, she was chartered by Angleterre-Lorraine-Alsace, the French subsidiary of Sealink. During the winter of 1991–92, she operated on the Dún Laoghaire - Holyhead route. In May 1993, she was placed in service on the Calais - Dover route, making her final voyages on 24 September.

=== Express Santorini ===
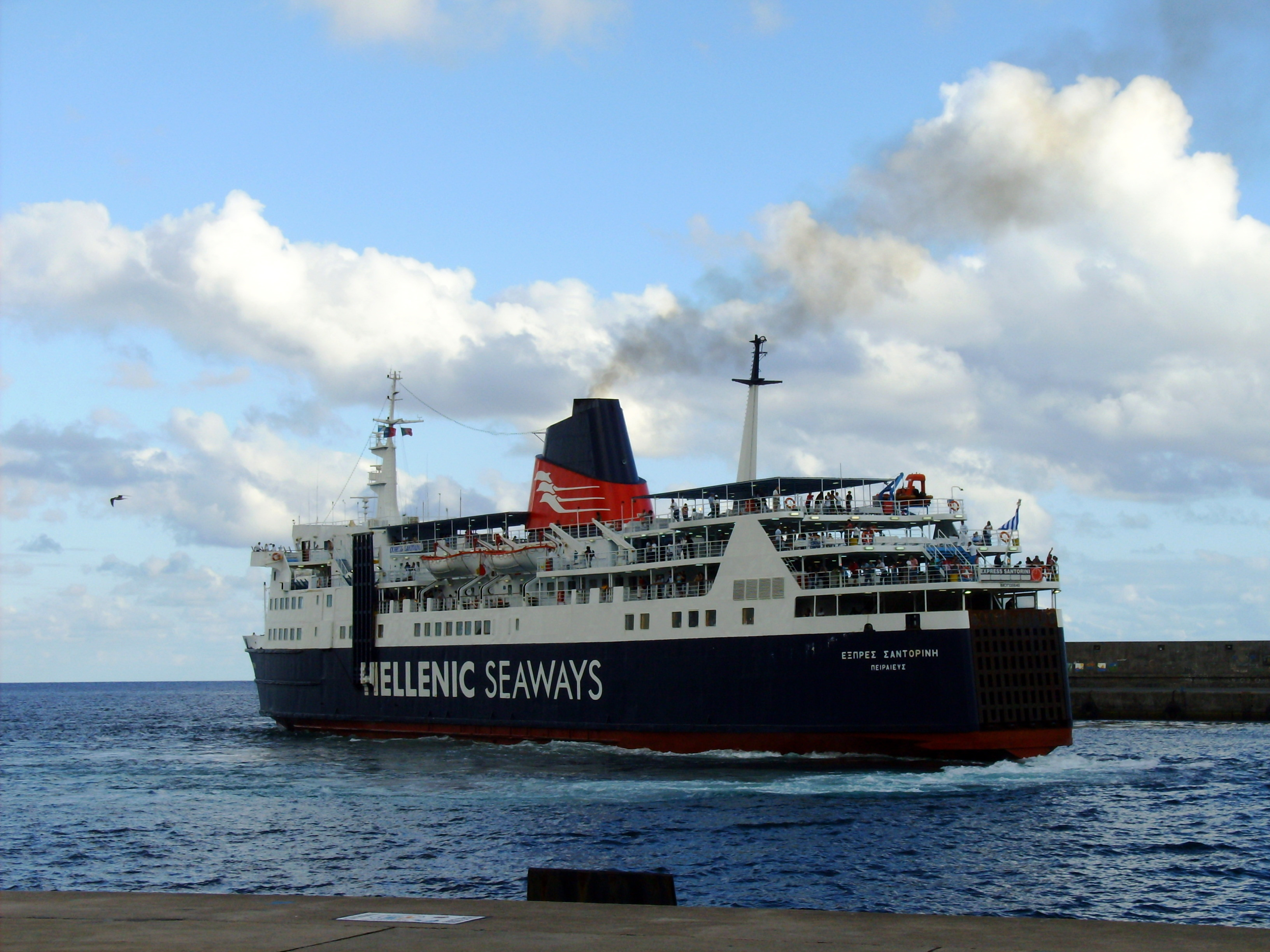
Express Santorini at the port of Vila do Porto

The vessel was acquired by Agapitos Express Ferries on 5 November 1993, and renamed the Express Santorini. She departed from Calais for Piraeus on 21 December, where there was a minor change in the ships livery following the takeover. From 1994, she operated the Piraeus-Paros-Naxos-Ios-Santorini route. On 8 November 1999, Express Santorini was sold to Minoan Flying Dolphins and was operated under the brand of Hellas Ferries, which remained unchanged following a 2000 rename of the mother company to Hellas Flying Dolphins. She operated on the Piraeus-Paros-Naxos-Ios-Santorini route.

In 2005 while still operating on the same route, Hellas Flying Dolphins adopted the Hellenic Seaways name, and the ferry appeared in a revised blue hull colours.

In July 2006, she was laid-up in Drapetsona, following a major engine failure in June.

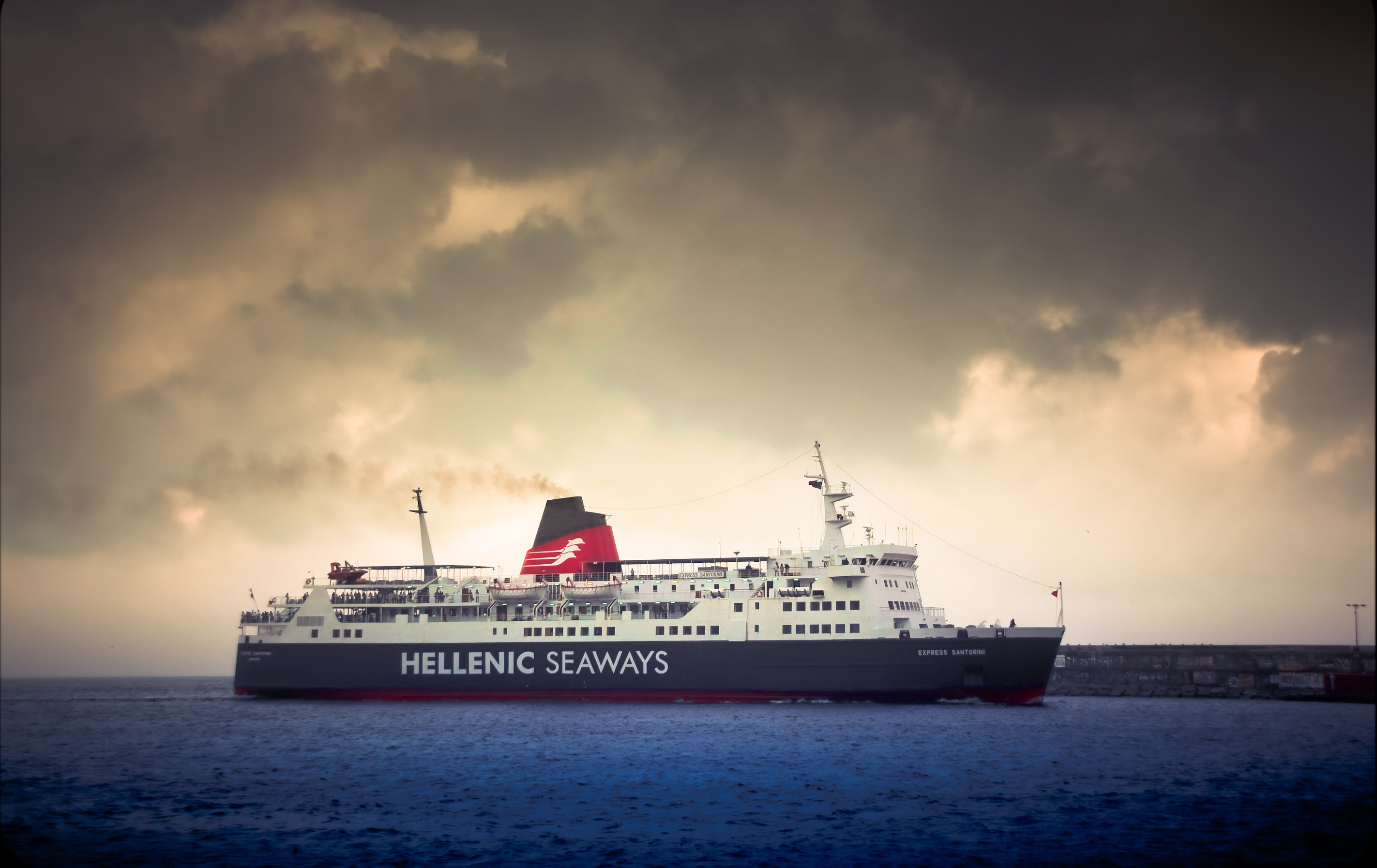
Express Santorini at São Miguel Island

Beginning in the summer of 2007, Express Santorini was chartered by Atlantico Line to operate in the Azores between the islands of Faial, Pico and Sao Jorge, until 30 September. Alternately, during the winter season, she continued to Piraeus where she operated local services. Following a further period laid up at Drapetsona, Express Santorini was again chartered by Atlantico Line between June and September 2008; she was also chartered between May and October from 2009 to 2014. That year she was sold to Portucalence Shipping and remained in service in the Azores until 2016, when she was sold to Salam Ak Makran Cargo, Dubai in 2016 as Al Salmy 4. In 2021 she was sold to Seajets and renamed Aqua Myth. In 2022 she was sold for scrap as Myth in Alang, India.

== Description ==
The ship was 115.40 metres (378 ft 7 in) long, with a beam of 19.23 metres (63 ft 1 in) and a draught of 4.19 metres (13 ft 9 in). She was assessed at 4,590 GRT – increased to 7,821 GT, 1,189 DWT on completion, and powered by two Pielstick 16PC2V400 diesel engines producing 11,768 kilowatts (15,781 hp).
