= Silver Arrow (rail-air service) =

Intermodal transport service linking London and Paris

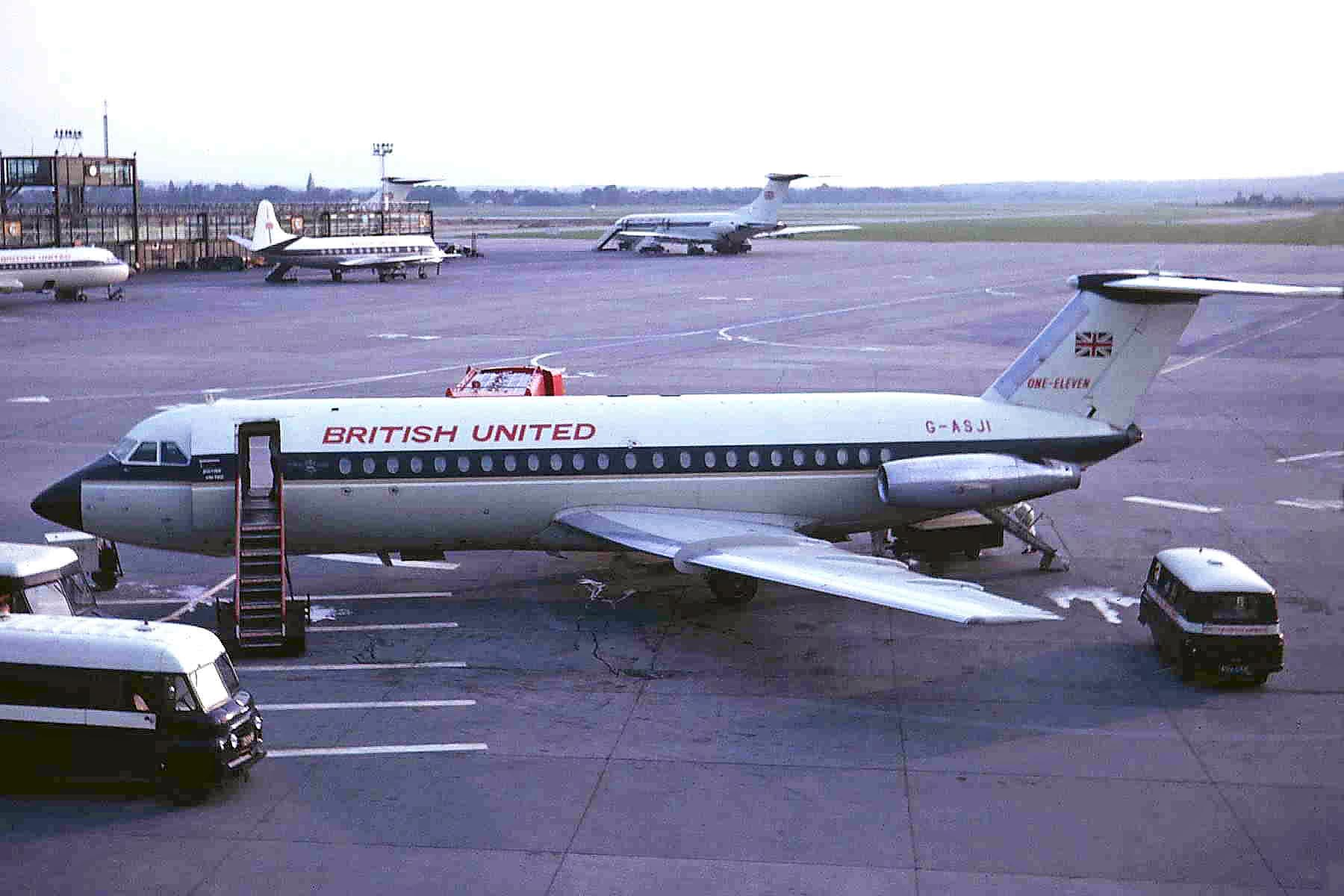
- BAC 1-11s operated the air mode of some Silver Arrow services

Overview
- Service type: Intermodal passenger
- Status: Discontinued
- Locale: England–France
- First service: 18 May 1956
- Last service: 1980
- Successor: Eurostar

Route
- Termini: Victoria station, London; Gare du Nord, Paris

The Silver Arrow (French: Flèche d’Argent) was an intermodal passenger transport service linking Victoria station in London with Gare du Nord in Paris, via Gatwick Airport and Le Touquet Airport, northern France. In operation between 1956 and the opening of the Channel Tunnel, it used a combination of rail and air transport, and, for some of its existence, also buses.

== See also ==
- Eurostar – train service via the Channel Tunnel (since 1994)
- Golden Arrow and La Flèche d’Or – boat trains that, in combination with a ferry, linked London with Paris
- Night Ferry – sleeper train between London and Paris/Brussels (1936–1980)
