= TSS Canterbury =

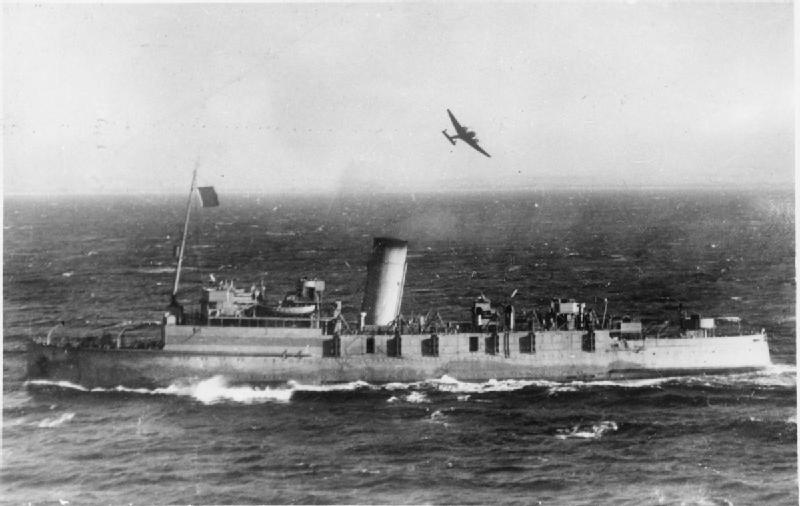
- As HMS Canterbury in wartime service

History
- Name: 1929–1939: TSS Canterbury; 1940–1945: HMS Canterbury; 1946–1965: TSS Canterbury
- Owner: 1929–1942: Southern Railway
- Operator: 1939–1940: Southern Railway; 1942–1945: Admiralty requisition; 1945–1948: Southern Railway; 1948–1963: British Transport Commission; 1963–1965: British Railways Board
- Route: 1929–1940: Dover–Calais; 1946–1946: Dover–Calais; 1946–1964: Folkestone–Boulogne
- Builder: William Denny and Brothers, Dumbarton
- Yard number: 1218
- Launched: 13 December 1928
- Identification: Official number: 161199
- Fate: Broken up 1 August 1965

General characteristics
- Type: Turbine Steel Steamship
- Tonnage: 2,910 GRT; 1,155 NRT; 602 DWT
- Length: 329.6 ft (100.5 m)
- Beam: 47.1 ft (14.4 m)
- Draught: 12.0 ft (3.7 m)
- Depth: 16.9 ft (5.2 m)
- Propulsion: 2 screw
- Speed: 22 kn (41 km/h; 25 mph)

TSS Canterbury was a ferry completed in 1929 to link the Golden Arrow and La Flèche d'Or trains to form the prestige London–Dover–Calais–Paris service.

== Construction ==
The ship was built as first class only passenger ferry by William Denny & Bros of Dumbarton, Scotland for the Southern Railway.

== Service ==
The ship entered service simultaneously with the Golden Arrow rail service. At this time she was first class only, and while having a capacity of 1700, her projected loadings were expected to be less than 400.

The ship was modified to accommodate two classes of passengers from May 1931, at the same time as third class carriages were introduced on the Golden Arrow train.

Following the Golden Arrow's last trip after the declaration of the Second World War, Canterbury was converted to a troop ship. On 29 May 1940 after departing the east pier at Dunkirk at 16:50 with 1960 troops Canterbury was badly damaged by a bomb near miss but was able to reach Dover. Following repairs she continued with the evacuation on 3 June 1940 completing five trips for the evacuation. She then performed some sailings from Southampton evacuations to Normandy and Brittany until the middle of June before resting on the River Dart and serving as a target practice ship of the Fleet Air Arm and a period on the Stranraer–Larne route.

From June 1942, she undertook an eight-month conversion to a troop landing ship and took part in the June 1944 Normandy landings.

Postwar, she initially returned to the Golden Arrow service, but was replaced in October 1946 by the Southern Railways flagship SS Invicta following that ship's refurbishment. Canterbury served on the Folkestone–Calais run, and in 1948 moved to the Calais–Boulogne route until retirement in 1964. In 1948, Canterbury became the first English Channel ferry to be equipped with radar.

== Fate ==
The ship was broken up in 1965.

== Preservation ==
The ship's bell and a Second World War memorial plaque are held by the National Railway Museum.

== In fiction ==
In 1951 she made an appearance as the cross-channel ferry in the British comedy film The Lavender Hill Mob.
