= Night Ferry =

Boat train from London to Paris

Overview
- Service type: Boat train
- Status: Ceased
- First service: 14 October 1936
- Last service: 31 October 1980
- Successor: Eurostar
- Former operators: Compagnie Internationale des Wagons-Lits (1936-1976); British Rail (1977-1980)

Route
- Termini: London Victoria; Paris Gare du Nord
- Distance travelled: ~ 500 kilometres
- Average journey time: ~ 11 hours
- Service frequency: Nightly

The Night Ferry was an international boat train from London Victoria to Paris Gare du Nord that crossed the English Channel on a train ferry. It ran from 1936 until 1980, with a break in services from 1939-1947 due to World War II. It was operated by Compagnie Internationale des Wagons-Lits until 1977 and then British Rail.

== History ==
A 1953 British Railways poster for the Night Ferry illustrating the loading of carriages onto the ferry

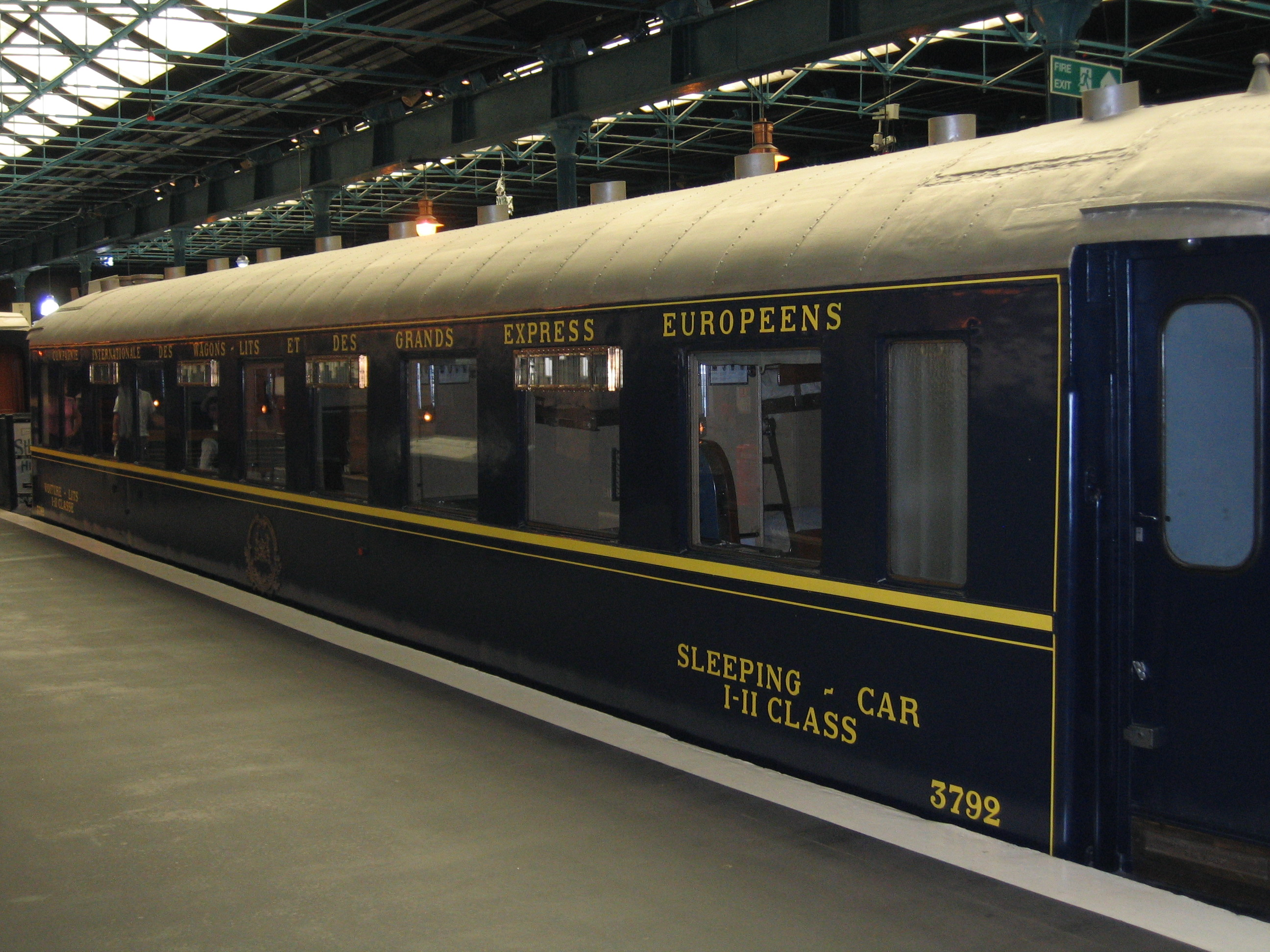
Sleeping car 3792 at the National Railway Museum

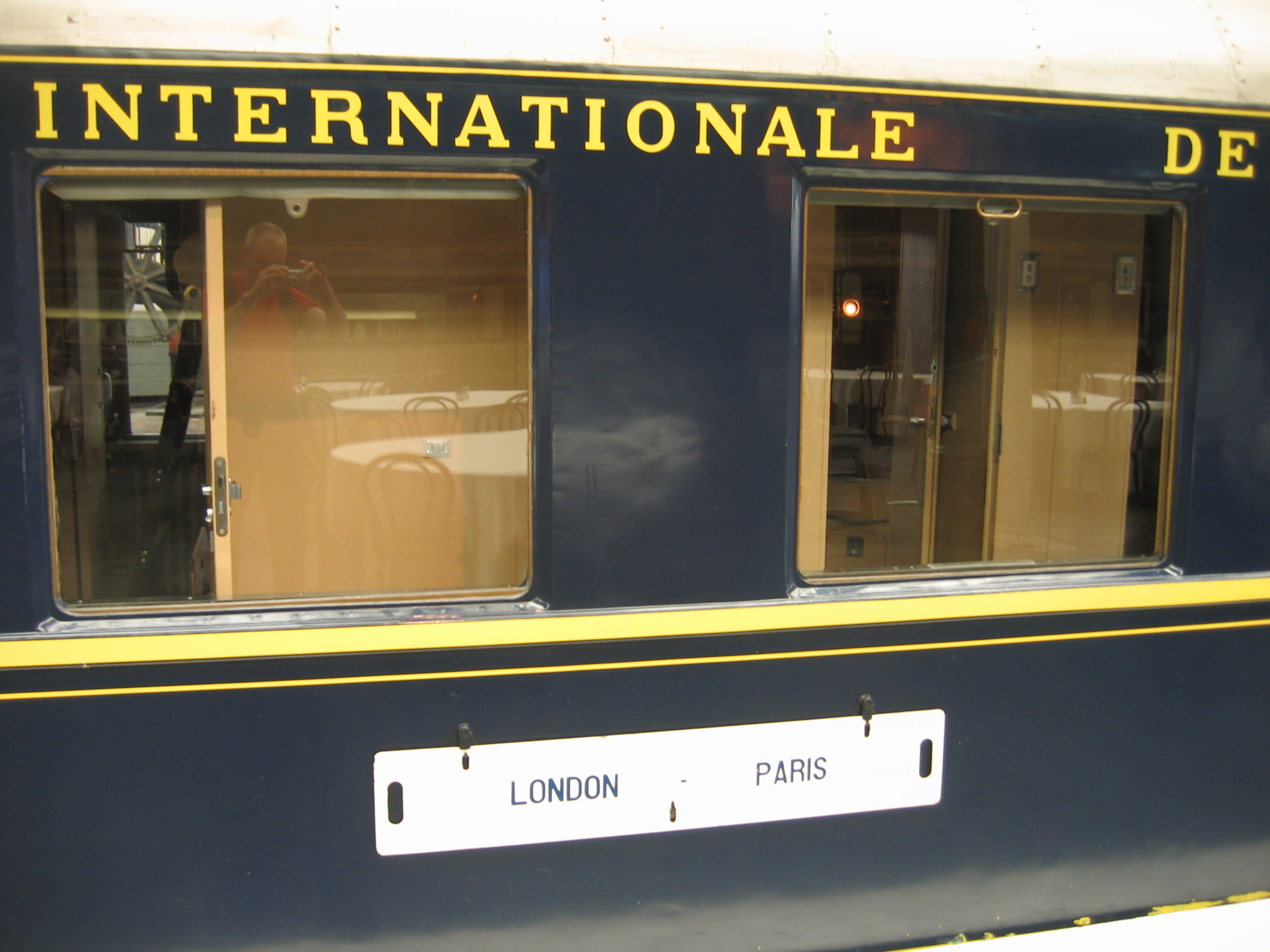
Sleeping car 3792 at the National Railway Museum

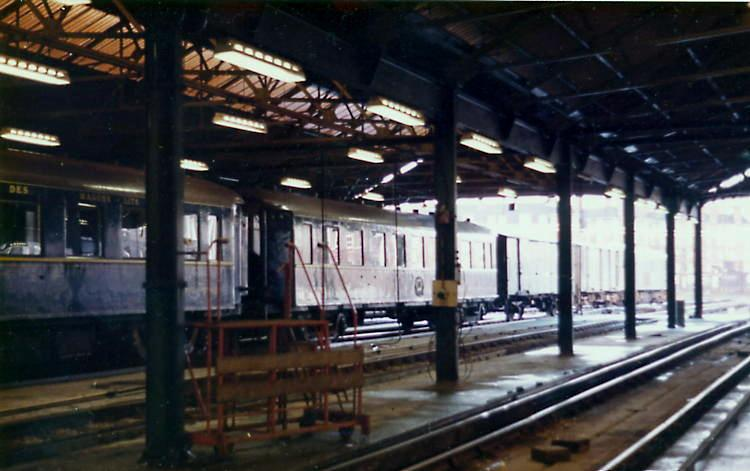
Night Ferry stock in the London Victoria car sheds

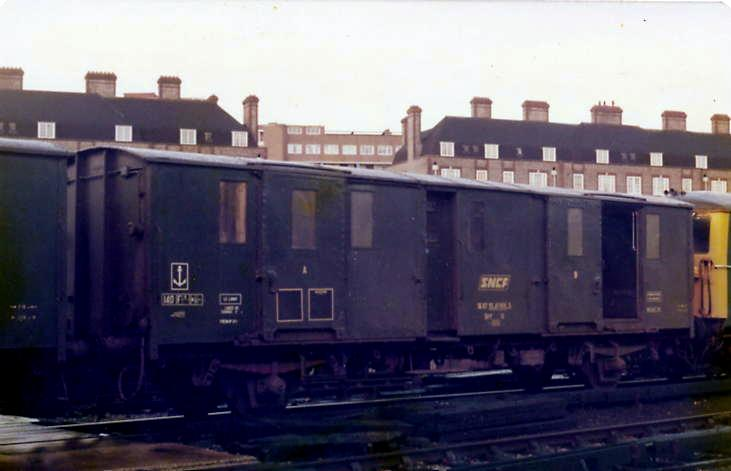
A SNCF luggage van used on Night Ferry services

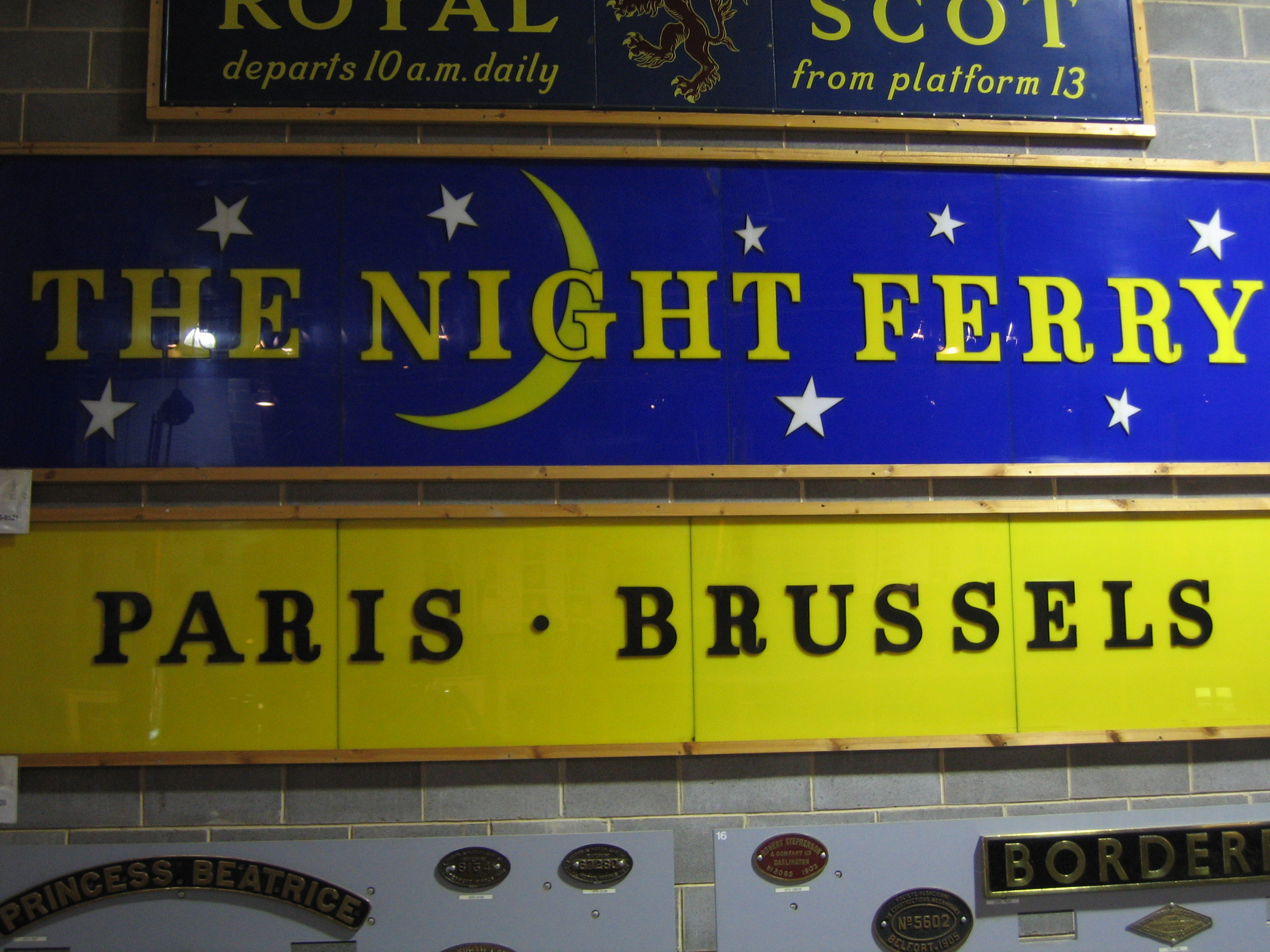
Signs from Victoria station at the National Railway Museum

The Night Ferry was introduced on the night of 14 October 1936. The train was operated by Compagnie Internationale des Wagons-Lits (CIWL) until 1 January 1977, when it was taken over by British Rail. Motive power was provided by the Southern Railway and later British Railways in England, SNCF in France and from 1957, by SNCB in Belgium.

When loaded onto the train ferry the train was split into sections and loaded equally on tracks on the port and starboard sides of the ship, to maintain its balance. It normally departed from and arrived at platform 2 at London Victoria where customs checks were performed.

The first class sleeping cars and the baggage vans travelled the entire journey. The English train from London Victoria to Dover, and the French train from Dunkirk to Paris Gare du Nord, conveyed normal second class carriages of their own railway. The passengers travelling by these walked on and off the ship in the standard way. The English train conveyed one of a pair of standard Mark 1 Brake Composite carriages, which had been modified with a French-style gangway connection at one end. This provided the guard's compartment in England and enabled the guard to walk through the train.

From November 1936, a Pullman Car Company dining carriage was added for the serving of supper and breakfast, operated between Victoria and Dover. Following British Railways taking over the Southern Railway, but not Pullman, a British Rail carriage took over the restaurant duties from January 1948, although still crewed by Pullman, until 1962 when Pullman was merged into British Transport Hotel and Catering Services. In France, a dining carriage was attached, initially a 1926 carriage built by the Birmingham Railway Carriage & Wagon Company.

After ceasing with the onset of World War II in September 1939, services resumed on 15 December 1947. From 2 June 1957, a through coach to and from Brussels was attached/detached at Lille. In the winter seasons of 1967/68 and 1968/69, a daily through coach to and from Basel, Switzerland was added, where onward connections to skiing resorts were provided.

In 1959, diesel locomotives were replaced by electric locomotives on parts of the train's route in both France and the UK – from 11 January between Paris and Arras and from 8 June between London and Dover – which allowed faster speeds (e.g. reducing the London–Dover journey time by 12 minutes). Following electrification of the South Eastern Main Line between Sevenoaks and Dover Marine in 1961, the train was usually hauled within England by Class 71 electric locomotives. In its final years Class 33 diesels or Class 73 electro-diesels were often used.

Until the Eurostar service began on 14 November 1994, the Night Ferry had been the only through passenger train between the United Kingdom and continental Europe. The carriages of the daytime Golden Arrow train did not cross the English Channel.

Plans to build the Channel Tunnel were scrapped in the 1970s on cost grounds. This gave the Night Ferry a short reprieve; a tunnel would have inevitably led to the end of conveying passenger carriages by train ferry.

By the 1970s the carriages were dated and in need of replacement. They were not air-conditioned, and during the ship voyage, while inside the ship, they became notably hot in summer. This was exacerbated by the chaining of the vehicles to the ship's deck, an activity underneath the sleeping compartments which inevitably woke most passengers up during the middle of the night. The carriages were over 40 years old, and by some margin were the oldest passenger vehicles running on the British network.

From 1 January 1977, British Rail took over the operation of the train from CIWL. SNCF purchased the seven 1950s-built sleepers while others were leased from CIWL with some repainted in standard SNCF blue sleeper car livery including the SNCF logo and a prominent white stripe along the bodyside. Consideration was given to using British Rail Mark 1 sleeper carriages built in the late 1950s, but these too were dated and the idea was never adopted. The Night Ferry platform and trains as they were in 1974 featured towards the end of the final Steptoe and Son episode, the 1974 Christmas special. The Night Ferry was also used in part during the 1976 Children's Film Foundation drama Night Ferry.

Competition from air services also affected the train. The Night Ferry was withdrawn on 31 October 1980.

== Rolling stock ==
For the commencement of the service, 12 sleeping carriages (numbered 3788-3799) were built by ANF Industrie for the CIWL to an adapted design to fit the British loading gauge in 1935/36. A further six (3800-3805) were built in 1939 by the Compagnie Générale de Construction in St Denis, but did not enter service until 1946.

A final seven (3983-3989) were built in 1952, also built at St Denis, to replace wartime losses. In addition to sleeping cars, the train normally included two SNCF Fourgon baggage vans. The National Railway Museum in York has preserved 3792 and has it on display at their Locomotion Museum in Shildon. The Bluebell Railway in East Grinstead had 3801 until 2022. The latter carriage was destroyed fire in 2025.

== Ferries ==
A train ferry was used between Dover and Dunkirk to convey passengers as they slept. The train used one of the three Southern Railway train ferries: SS Hampton Ferry, SS Twickenham Ferry and SS Shepperton Ferry, built in the mid-1930s by Swan Hunter in Newcastle. Two ships were normally in service with the third as a spare.

After the loss of the MV Princess Victoria car ferry in 1953 on a voyage from Stranraer Harbour to Larne Harbour it was normal for the Hampton Ferry to go to Stranraer each summer to provide a drive on/off car ferry service, and the annual ship overhauls were scheduled in the winter when it would return to relieve the other two in turn. This arrangement ended in 1961. There was also a SNCF-owned train ferry, the MV St Germain, built in 1951, and some of the car ferries built later, including the MV Vortigern, also had rail tracks and were used on the service; the original ships were withdrawn between 1969 and 1974.

At Port of Dover and Dunkirk special enclosed docks with sea locks were built so that the train ferry could be kept at a reasonably constant level relative to the railway tracks on the land. It was not possible for railway vehicles to ascend the steep gradient that road vehicles would sometimes have to use crossing a car ferry linkspan when the tide is at its fullest extent. At high tide the ship could steam directly in or out of the dock, but at low tide the water had to be let out first before departure, like a canal lock, and on arrival water had to be pumped in to bring the ship up to track level. There was a pumphouse alongside each dock to perform this rather long-winded process. In contrast the train ferries which used to link parts of Denmark and Scandinavia did not have such problems, as the tidal range in the Baltic Sea is far less than at the Strait of Dover.

Two ships were required for the service each night. They passed in mid-Channel, the voyage taking about three hours. The ships usually returned in the daytime, carrying only freight wagons. On some crossings road vehicles were also carried alongside the trains, the decks of the ships being level with the embedded rail tracks. The carriages were chained to four parallel tracks in the ferry's hold.

Along with the removal of much of the old railway infrastructure at Dover Marine (renamed Dover Western Docks in 1979), the Night Ferry enclosed dock at Dover has been filled in and is now used as an aggregates terminal.

== Channel Tunnel ==
An attempted resurrection of British–Continental sleeper services under the Nightstar brand after the opening of the Channel Tunnel in 1994 was abandoned after the carriages for it had been built. The arrival of cheap airlines in the 1990s meant the service could never be profitable, and the proposed service faced daunting logistical issues as well. The carriages, which were never used in Europe, were eventually sold to Via Rail of Canada.

== Timetable ==
The journey from London to Paris took 11 hours
Winter timetable 1959/1960

Down	station	Up
21:00	d London Victoria a	09:10
22:42	a Dover Marine d	07:20
05:34	d Dunkirk a	01:21
09:00	a Paris Gare du Nord d	22:00
08:44	a Brussels d	21:15

== See also ==
- List of named passenger trains of the United Kingdom
