= Benjamin Britten (train) =

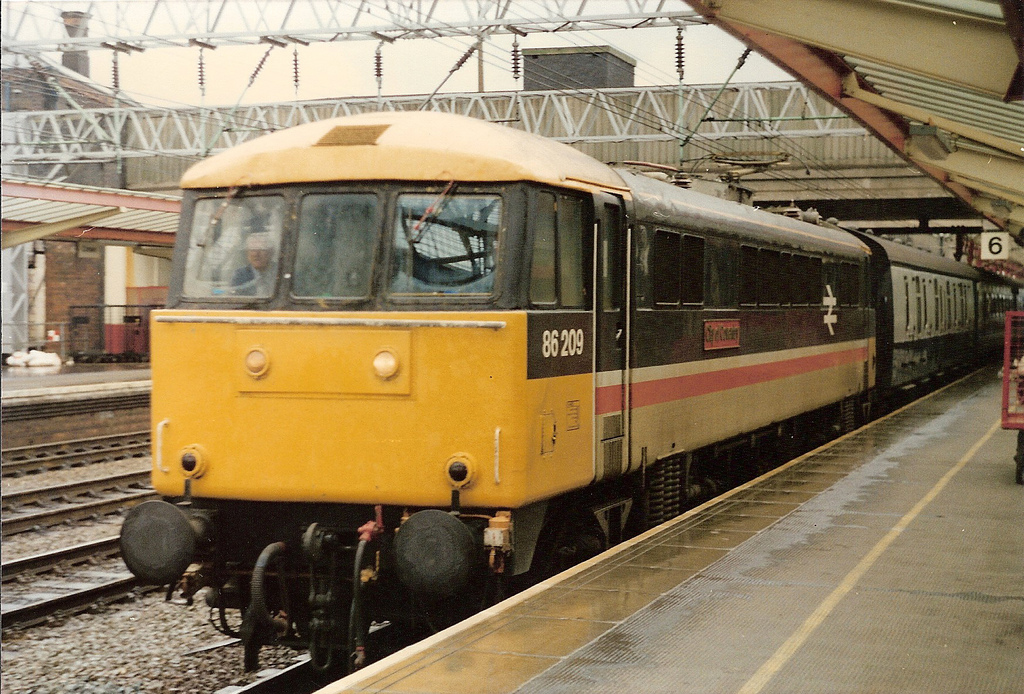
- BR Class 86209 "City of Coventry" at Crewe, 31 July 1986.

Overview
- Service type: EuroCity (EC) (1987–1988); InterCity (IC) (1988–?)
- Locale: Netherlands; United Kingdom
- Predecessor: Hook Continental
- First service: 31 May 1987
- Former operator(s): Nederlandse Spoorwegen; British Rail

Route
- Termini: Amsterdam CS; London Liverpool Street

Technical
- Track gauge: 1,435 mm (4 ft 8 1/2 in)
- Electrification: 1500 V DC (Netherlands); 25 kVAC (United Kingdom)

The Benjamin Britten was an international train service linking Amsterdam with London. The train service was named after English composer Benjamin Britten due to his international status and his association with East Anglia, through which the service passes.

== History ==
The Benjamin Britten was one of the initial services of the 1987 EuroCity network. It was operated as a boat train, the first part London Liverpool Street – Harwich by train, the second Harwich – Hook of Holland by Sealink ferry, and the final part, Hook of Holland – Amsterdam, by train. The journey of 69 miles (111 km) from London to Harwich Parkeston Quay railway station took 70 minutes.

The eastbound EC Benjamin Britten and the westbound EC Admiraal de Ruijter had timed connections with the day boats. The return services had timed connections with the night boats.

Each of these trains lost its EuroCity label after one year of service because it did not meet the EuroCity criteria for service quality; sometimes other rolling stock was used and the on-board catering was minimal from the start. However, both trains also remained in the timetable, as InterCity services.

== Formation (consist) ==
The Nederlandse Spoorwegen used three coupled Koplopers between Amsterdam and Hook of Holland. Ferries of Stoomvaart Maatschappij Zeeland (the MS Koningin Beatrix) or Sealink (the MS St Nicholas) provided the shipping. British Rail used its most modern InterCity coaches hauled by Class 86 locomotives on the Harwich – London portion.

== Works cited ==
- Nieuwenhuis, Gerrit (1987). Spoorwegen 88 (in Dutch). Alkmaar: Uitgeverij de Alk. ISBN 90-6013839-2.
