= MV Saint Germain (1951) =

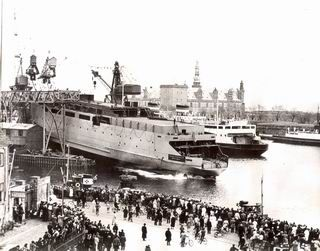
- Launch of Saint Germain, 5 April 1951

History
- Name: Saint Germain (1951 - 1988); Germain (1988)
- Owner: SNCF (1951 - 1988)
- Operator: SNCF (1951 - 1962, 1962 - 1988); Townsend Thoresen (1962)
- Port of registry: Dunkirk, France
- Route: see text
- Builder: Helsingør Skibs og Maskinbyggeri
- Yard number: 303
- Launched: 5 April 1951
- Maiden voyage: 28 July 1951
- Out of service: 16 May 1988
- Identification: Call sign FNXF; IMO number: 5305895
- Fate: Scrapped

General characteristics
- Class & type: Train ferry
- Tonnage: 3,492 GRT; 1,299 NRT
- Length: 115.80 metres (379 ft 11 in)
- Beam: 18.60 metres (61 ft 0 in)
- Draught: 4.1 metres (13 ft 5 in)
- Installed power: 2 diesel engines by builder, 4,490 kilowatts (6,020 hp)
- Propulsion: 2 screw propellers
- Speed: 18.0 knots (33.3 km/h)
- Capacity: 36 sleeping cars and 2 PMVs or 36 railway wagons or 160 motor cars.; 850 passengers (1951–76), 1,000 passengers (1976–85)

Saint Germain was a 3,492 GRT train ferry which was built in 1951 by Helsingør Skibs og Maskinbyggeri for SNCF. She served until 1988 when withdrawn from service and scrapped.

== Description ==
Saint Germain was 115.80 metres (379 ft 11 in) long, with a beam of 18.60 metres (61 ft 0 in) and a draught of 4.10 metres (13 ft 5 in). She was powered by two 9-cylinder Burmeister & Wain diesel engines producing a total of 4,490 kilowatts (6,020 hp), driving twin screw propellers. These could propel the ship at 18.0 knots (33.3 km/h).

== History ==
Saint Germain was built by Helsingør Skibs og Maskinbyggeri, Helsingør, Denmark for SNCF. She was launched on 5 April 1951. Her port of registry was Dunkirk and she was allocated the Call sign FNXF. She had a capacity of 36 sleeping cars and two PMVs or 36 railway wagons or 160 motor cars. As built, she had capacity for 850 passengers. Saint Germain arrived at Dunkirk on 25 July 1951 and entered service three days later on the Dunkerque - Dover route. On 11 December 1951, she collided with the pier at Dover, damaging her stern and was thus unable to transport the sleeping cars of the Night Ferry. On 6 September 1953, she collided with St. Jean whilst on a voyage from Dunkirk to Dover, but was able to complete the voyage. In 1958, she spent five weeks on the Calais - Dover route.

In August and September 1962, Saint Germain was chartered to Townsend Thoresen for use on the Dover - Calais route. On return to SNCF, she was put into service on the Dunkirk - Harwich route. With the introduction of IMO Numbers in the late 1960s, Saint Germain was allocated the IMO Number 5305895. On 6 February 1967, she struck the lock gates at Dunkirk and was damaged.

In 1976, Saint Germain was transferred to the Dunkirk - Dover route. Her passenger capacity was increased to 1,000. On 21 February 1979, she collided with the Liberian bulk carrier Artadi, killing two people and injuring four more. She was repaired at Dunkirk, returning to service operating a reduced speed.

From 20 February 1985, she was used solely as a freight ferry. On 8 July 1987, she damaged her bow in a collision with the pier at Dover. Saint Germain was withdrawn from service on 16 May 1988. She was sold to Triton Ship Delivery, London on 21 July and renamed Germain. She arrived at Alang, India, on 11 August 1988 for scrapping by NCK Sun Exports.
