= SS Twickenham Ferry =

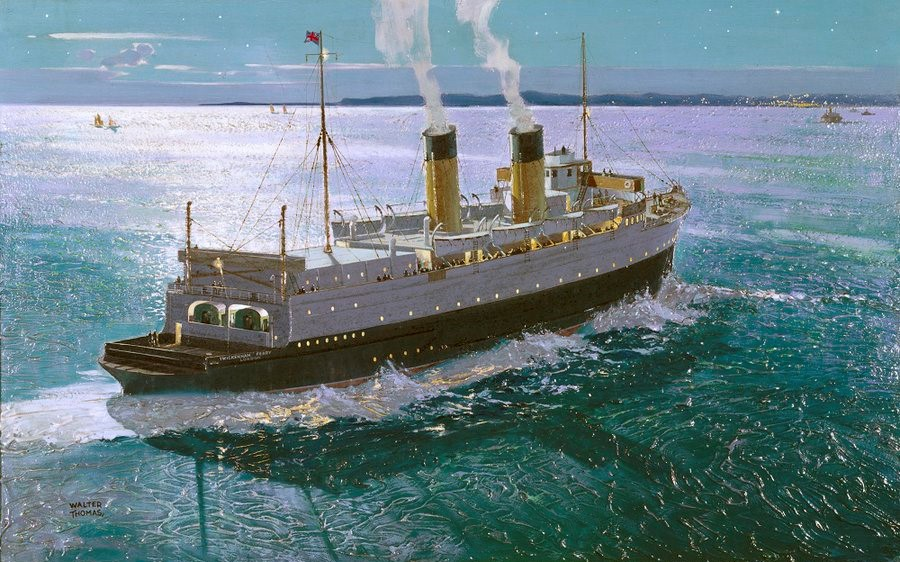
- Twickenham Ferry

History
- Name: SS Twickenham Ferry (1934–39); HMS Twickenham (1939–45); SS Twickenham Ferry (1945–74)
- Owner: Southern Railway & Angleterre-Lorraine-Alsace (joint owners, 1934–39); Admiralty (1939–45); Southern Railway & Angleterre-Lorraine-Alsace (joint owners, 1945–47); British Transport Commission (1948–62); British Railways Board (1963–74)
- Operator: Southern Railway (1934–36); Angleterre-Lorraine-Alsace (1936–39); Royal Navy (1939–45); Angleterre-Lorraine-Alsace (1945–47); British Railways (1948–68); British Rail Sealink (1968–74)
- Port of registry: (United Kingdom) London (1934–36); (France) Dunkerque (1936–39); (United Kingdom) London (1939–45); (France) Dunkerque (1945–74)
- Route: Dover - Dunkerque (1936–39); Larne - Stranraer (1940, 1941–44)
- Builder: Swan, Hunter & Wigham Richardson Ltd
- Yard number: 1446
- Launched: 15 March 1934
- Completed: July 1934
- In service: 1934
- Out of service: 1974
- Identification: Code Letters GWTQ (1934–36); Code Letters FOSA (1936- ); Code Letters BCYF (1939–45); United Kingdom Official Number 163500 (1934–36, 1939–45); IMO number: 5371478 ( -1974)
- Fate: Scrapped

General characteristics
- Tonnage: 2,839 GRT; 1,044 NRT; 1,200 DWT
- Length: 346 ft 8 in (105.66 m)
- Beam: 60 ft 7 in (18.47 m)
- Draught: 13 ft 6 in (4.11 m)
- Depth: 18 ft 2 in (5.54 m)
- Installed power: Four steam turbines, single reduction geared
- Propulsion: Twin screw propellers
- Speed: 16 knots (30 km/h)
- Notes: Sister ships Hampton Ferry and Shepperton Ferry.

Twickenham Ferry was a train ferry built in 1934 for the Southern Railway. She served during the Second World War as a minesweeper and returned to merchant service post-war, serving until 1974 when she was scrapped.

== Description ==
Twickenham Ferry was one of three ships built to the same design. Her sister ships were Hampton Ferry and Shepperton Ferry. She was 346 feet 8 inches (105.66 m) long, with a beam of 60 feet 7 inches (18.47 m). She had a depth of 18 feet 2 inches (5.54 m) and a draught of 13 feet 6 inches (4.11 m). She was 2,839 GRT, 1,044 NRT, and 1,200 DWT.

She was powered by four Parsons turbines, which were built by Parsons. Steam was supplied by boilers made by Yarrows Ltd, Scotstoun. The four turbines drove twin screw propellers through single reduction gearing and they had a total power output of 948 nhp (3,300 kW). She had a service speed of 16 knots (30 km/h).

Twickenham Ferry could carry 12 sleeping cars or 40 goods wagons, with space for 25 cars. Accommodation was provided for 500 passengers.

== History ==
Twickenham Ferry was built by Swan, Hunter and Wigham Richardson Ltd as yard number 1446. Launched on 15 March 1934, completion was in July. Jointly owned by the Southern Railway & Angleterre-Lorraine-Alsace, she was built for service on the Dover - Dunkerque route, but initially operated out of Southampton as the new facilities at Dover were not ready. Her port of registry was London and the code letters GWTQ were allocated. On 22 September 1936, she was reflagged to France. Her port of registry was changed to Dunkerque and her code letters were changed to FOSA. Twickenham Ferry commenced service between Dover and Dunkerque on 6 October 1936. She served on this route until 25 August 1939.

The next day, Twickenham Ferry was requisitioned by the Admiralty as HMS Twickenham. Her port of registry was changed to London and the code letters BCYF were allocated. She was re-allocated the Official Number 163500. She was converted to a minesweeper, and initially based at Southampton. She was put into service between Larne and Stranraer from July to December 1940, and again from March 1941 to January 1944. By November 1944, Twickenham was employed in taking locomotives to Calais being able to carry 16 locomotives and 16 wagons. She could also carry an ambulance train of 14 carriages and four wagons., with the associated personnel. On 24 January 1945, HMS Twickenham was involved in a collision with the tug Empire Rupert 10 nautical miles (19 km) off Dover (51°03′N 1°32′E). Empire Rupert sank.

On 31 October 1945, HMS Twickenham was returned to Angleterre-Lorraine-Alsace and regained her former name of Twickenham Ferry. She was the first Southern Railway ship to enter Cherbourg post-war. In 1947, Twickenham Ferry was converted from coal to oil burning. On the formation of British Railways in 1948, Twickenham Ferry was registered to the British Transport Commission. With the introduction of IMO Numbers, Twickenham Ferry was allocated the number 5371478. With the introduction of TOPS in 1968, Sealink ships were classed as locomotives for TOPS purposes, being allocated Class 99. Twickenham Ferry was allocated 99 006. She was withdrawn from service in 1974 as her boilers were life-expired. Her final day of service was 5 May 1974. On 24 May, she was sold for scrap, arriving on 26 May at San Esteban de Pravia, Spain, where she was scrapped by Stellnortem.
