= La Flèche d'Or =

Luxury French boat train

La Flèche d’Or (English: The Golden Arrow) was a luxury boat train of the Chemin de Fer du Nord and later SNCF. It linked Paris with Calais, where passengers took the ferry to Dover to join the Golden Arrow of the Southern Railway and later British Railways, which took them on to London.

== In popular culture ==
- La Flèche d'Or appeared as the backdrop to a photoshoot by Audrey Hepburn's character in the 1957 movie Funny Face with Fred Astaire.

== See also ==
- Eurostar – high-speed train service via the Channel Tunnel (since 1994)
- Night Ferry – sleeper train between London and Paris/Brussels (1936–1980)
- Silver Arrow (rail-air service) – intermodal passenger transport service between London and Paris (1956–c 1994)
