= MV Armenistis =

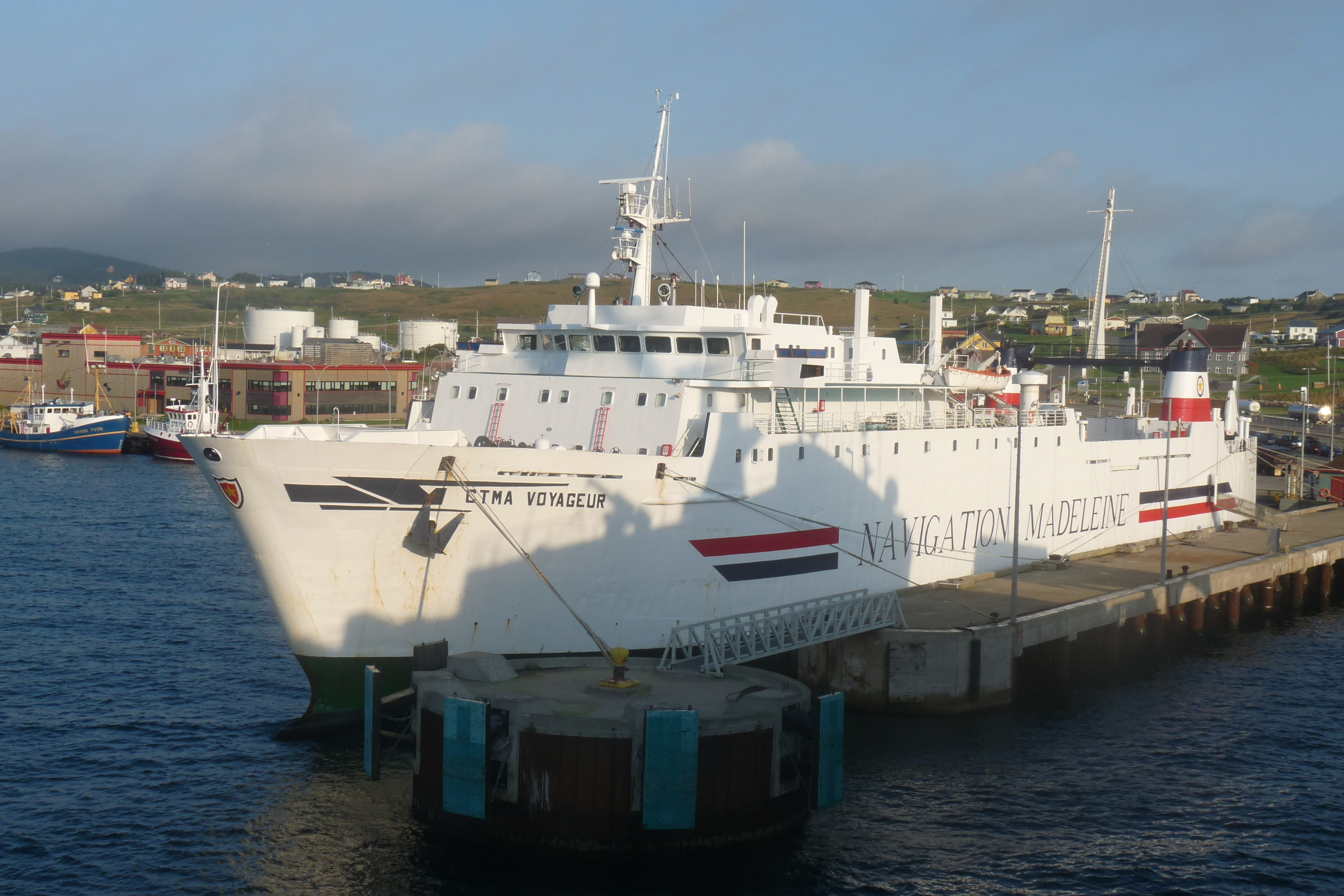
- C.T.M.A. Voyageur at Cap-aux-Meules in 2011.

History
- Name: Anderida (1971–1981); Truck Trader (1981–1984); Sealink (1984–1986); Mirela (1986–1987); C.T.M.A. Voyageur (1987–2020); Armenistis (2020–present)
- Owner: Stena Line AB (1971–1972); Carpass Shipping Ltd (1972–1981); Covenant Shipping Inc (1981–1984); South Pacific Navigation Ltd (1984–1986); Navigation Madeleine Inc (1986–2020); Ainaftis (2020–2021); Star Mariners SA. (2021–present)
- Operator: Stena Line AB (1972); Carpass Shipping Ltd (1972); British Rail (1972–1980); Manta Line Inc (1981–1984); South Pacific Navigation Ltd (1984–1986); Coopérative de Transport Maritime et Aérien (1986–2020); Ainaftis (2020–2021); Star Mariners SA. (2021–present)
- Port of registry: London, United Kingdom (1972–1981); Piraeus, Greece (1981–1985); Wellington, New Zealand (1985–1986); Cap-aux-Meules, Canada (1986–2020); Chios, Greece (2020–2021); (Cook Islands) (2021); , Lomé, Togo (2021–present)
- Builder: Trosvik Verksted A/S Brevik
- Yard number: 95
- Launched: 11 December 1971
- In service: 28 April 1972
- Identification: IMO number: 7222229
- Status: Laid up

General characteristics
- Class & type: Train ferry
- Tonnage: 4,529 GT, 3,252 NT, 2,591 DWT
- Length: 106.00 m (347 ft 9 in)
- Beam: 16.03 m (52 ft 7 in)
- Draught: 4.30 m (14 ft 1 in)
- Installed power: 4 Normo diesel engines, 3,376 kW (4,527 hp)
- Speed: 17 knots (31 km/h; 20 mph)
- Capacity: 12 passengers

MV Αrmenistis is a ferry in service in Greece. She was built in 1971 as Anderida for Stena Line, serving under charter with Sealink until 1980. She then served under the names Truck Trader, Sealink and Mirela before she was sold to the Coopérative de Transport Maritime et Aérien (CTMA) in 1986 and renamed C.T.M.A. Voyageur. In January 2020 it was announced that the ship was sold to the Greek company Ainaftis. Her new name is Armenistis.

== Description ==
Armenistis is 99.70 metres (327 ft 1 in) long, with a beam of 16.03 metres (52 ft 7 in) and a draught of 4.30 metres (14 ft 1 in). Assessed at 4,529 GT, 3,252 NT, 2,591 DWT, she is propelled by two 8-cylinder and two 9-cylinder diesel engines producing a total of 3,376 kilowatts (4,527 hp). These can propel the ship at 17 knots (31 km/h; 20 mph).

== History ==
Armenistis was built as a train ferry by Trosvik Verksted A/S, Brevik, Norway as Yard number 95. She was launched on 11 December 1971. Anderida was delivered on 28 April 1972. Originally ordered by Stena Line, she was sold whilst still under construction. Named after the Saxon Shore Fort, the ship was sold to Carpass Shipping Ltd on 1 May and was chartered to British Rail on 22 August. She entered service on the Dover–Dunkerque route on 28 August. In March 1975, she operated on the Larne–Stranraer route. In May 1976, she was employed on the Holyhead–Dún Laoghaire route, and in October she was put in service on the Heysham–Belfast route. In May 1977, she entered service on the Fishguard–Rosslare route. An engine room fire on 17 February 1979 put her out of service for a month. In December 1980, she returned to Dover and was laid up. In 1981, captains working for Sealink refused to sail Anderida from Dover to Newhaven in a bid to prevent Sealink laying her up there prior to sale.

Anderida was sold to Covenant Shipping Inc, Monrovia, Liberia, on 30 October 1981 and was renamed Truck Trader. She operated under the management of Manta Line Inc. Her port of registry was changed to Piraeus, Greece. On 3 December 1984, Truck Trader was sold to Marlborough Sealink of New Zealand and renamed Sealink. During the delivery voyage to New Zealand, she suffered an engine failure. She was reflagged to New Zealand in 1985. Sealink operated on the Cook Strait route from Wellington to Picton but was withdrawn due to competition from New Zealand Railways Corporation and sold by mid-1986. In 1986, she was renamed Mirela and was laid up at Piraeus on 31 October.

On 4 December 1986, Mirela was sold to CTMA subsidiary Navigation Madeleine Inc. She was renamed C.T.M.A. Voyageur in 1987 and entered service between Montreal and Cap-aux-Meules, Quebec. In June 2002, she was put into service between Prince Edward Island and the Magdalen Islands, later returning to the Montreal–Cap-aux-Meules route. As of 2006, she was mainly used during the winter on the Matane–Cap-aux-Meules route. In February 2020 the ship was sold to Greek company Ainaftis and in May 2020 renamed Armenistis.
