= Boat train =

Passenger train that takes its passengers to a port to be loaded on to a passenger ship

A boat train is a passenger train operating to a port for the specific purpose of making connection with a passenger ship, such as a ferry, ocean liner, or cruise ship. Through ticketing is normally available.

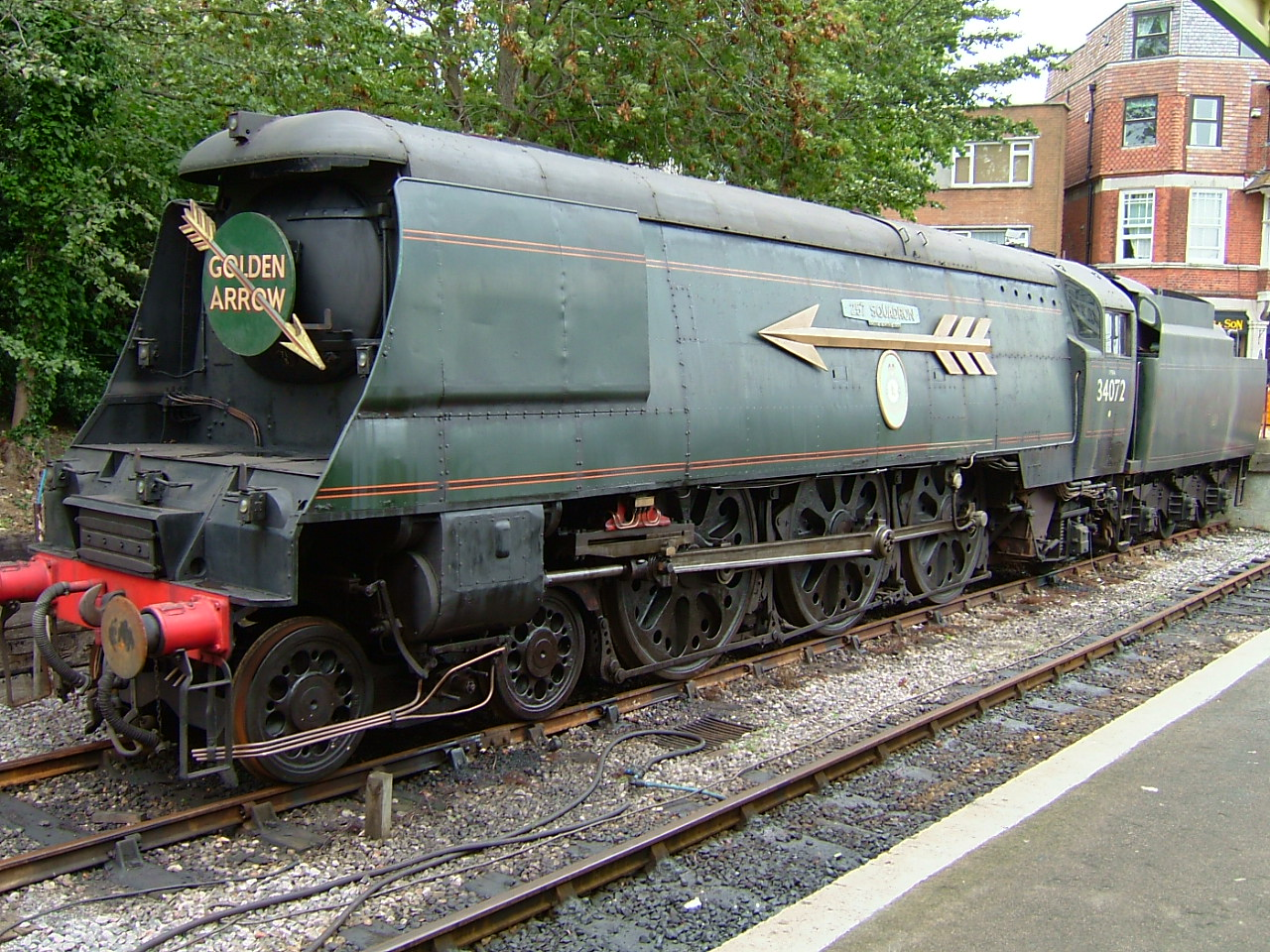
Battle of Britain class 34072 257 Squadron unrebuilt Bulleid Light Pacific, with the Golden Arrow styling, formerly operated by Southern Railway

== Notable named boat trains ==
- Admiraal de Ruijter, London Liverpool Street – Amsterdam Centraal (1987–2006)
- Benjamin Britten, London Liverpool Street – Amsterdam Centraal (1987–?)
- La Flèche d'Or (Golden Arrow), Paris Gare du Nord – Calais-Maritime (1929–1972)
- The Golden Arrow, London Victoria – Dover Marine (1929–1972)
- The Cunarder
  - London Waterloo – Southampton Docks (Ocean Terminal)
  - London Euston – Liverpool Riverside
  - Glasgow Central – Greenock Prince’s Pier
- Night Ferry, London Victoria – Paris Nord / Brussels Midi/Zuid (1936–1980)
- The Statesman, London Waterloo – Southampton Docks (Ocean Terminal)
- The Steam Boat, Toronto – Port McNicoll

== See also ==
- Train ferry, which carries rail vehicles as well as passengers
- Dutchflyer, London to Amsterdam
- Lyttelton Line Boat trains, New Zealand
- On the Wigan Boat Express, a song
- Venice-Simplon Orient Express, London to Paris and beyond
