= Admiraal de Ruijter (train) =

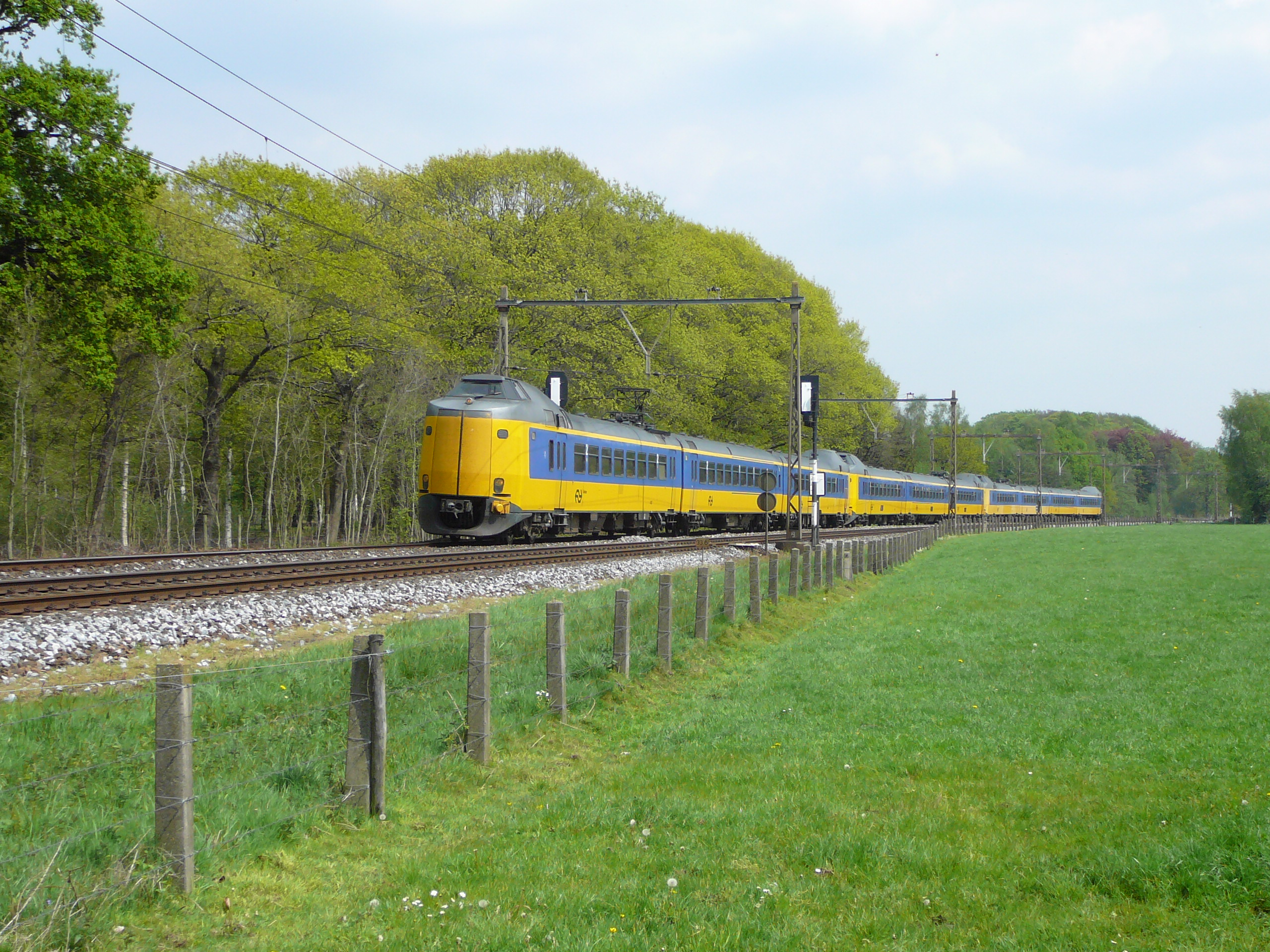
- NS Koploper

Overview
- Service type: EuroCity (EC) (1987–1988); InterCity (IC) (1988–2006)
- Locale: Netherlands; United Kingdom
- Predecessor: Hook Continental
- First service: 31 May 1987
- Former operator(s): Nederlandse Spoorwegen; British Rail

Route
- Termini: Amsterdam CS; London Liverpool Street

Technical
- Track gauge: 1,435 mm (4 ft 8 1/2 in)
- Electrification: 1500 V DC (Netherlands)

The Admiraal de Ruijter was an international train service linking Amsterdam with London.

The train was named after the Dutch Admiral Michiel de Ruyter, a remarkable choice because it was De Ruyter who attacked Britain and destroyed or seized many British navy ships during the Raid on the Medway several centuries earlier.

== History ==
The Admiraal de Ruijter was one of the day services in the 1987 EuroCity network. It was operated as a boat train, the first part Amsterdam – Hook of Holland by train, the second Hook of Holland – Harwich by boat and the last part, Harwich – London, by train.

The train's classification as a day train was related to the shipping during the day seen from the Dutch side, the westbound "night train" EC Benjamin Britten, connecting with the night boat ran at day time as well. In Britain the eastbound Admiraal de Ruijter was connected with the night boat and the eastbound Benjamin Britten with the day boat.

Each of these trains lost its EuroCity label after one year of service because it did not meet the EuroCity criteria for service quality; sometimes other rolling stock was used and the on-board catering was minimal from the start. However, both trains also remained in the timetable, as InterCity services.

== Formation (consist) ==
The Nederlandse Spoorwegen used three coupled Koplopers between Amsterdam and Hook of Holland. Ferries of Stoomvaart Maatschappij Zeeland (the MS Koningin Beatrix) or Sealink (the MS St Nicholas) provided the shipping. British Rail used its class 86 and Mark 2 coaching stock on the Harwich – London part.

== Works cited ==
- Nieuwenhuis, Gerrit (1987). Spoorwegen 88 (in Dutch). Alkmaar: Uitgeverij de Alk. ISBN 90-6013839-2.
