= Hook Continental =

Passenger train running between London and Harwich

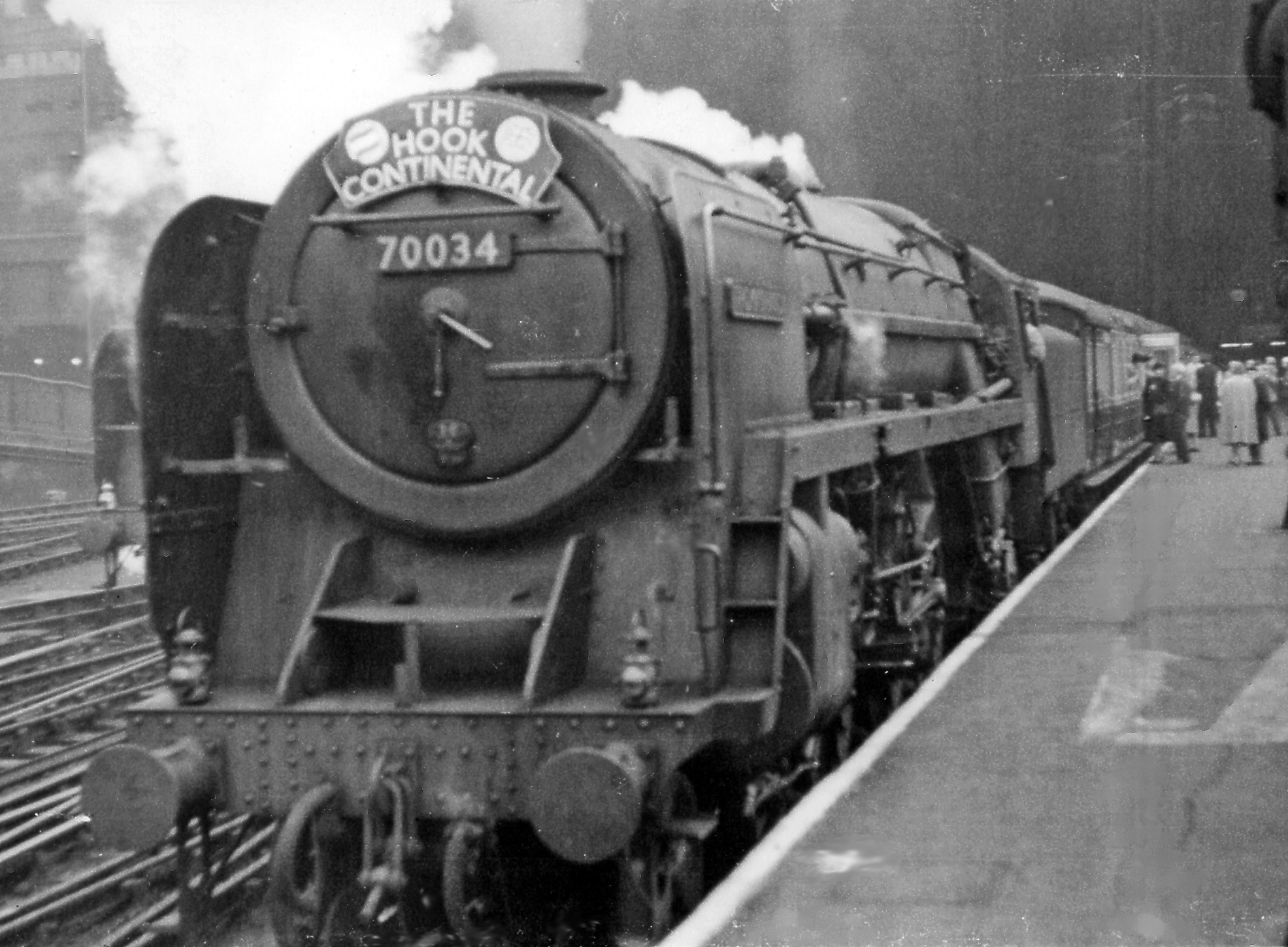
BR Standard Class 7 70034 Thomas Hardy at Liverpool Street with The Hook Continental, 1955.

The Hook Continental was a passenger train running between London's Liverpool Street Station and Harwich Parkeston Quay where it connected with the night ferry sailing to the Hook of Holland in the Netherlands. It was introduced as a named express by the London and North Eastern Railway (LNER) in 1927, and was part of the marketing strategy pushing the concept of almost seamless travel from London overnight to numerous European destinations utilising the company's own ships and the rail connections from the Hook of Holland.

== Early ferry services ==
The promotion of Harwich as a good railhead for ferry services across the North Sea dates back to the Eastern Counties Railway and from 1869 the Great Eastern Railway (GER) advertised using its services from Liverpool Street to Harwich in conjunction with a ferry service as "The shortest, cheapest, and most direct route" to a selection of northern European countries, and offered through tickets. A new station adjacent to a deep water quay was opened in 1883 and was named Parkestone Quay after the Chairman Charles Henry Parkes, and Hook of Holland became one of the main destinations of ferry services from 1893.

== GER and LNER ==
In 1905 the GER produced its first corridor train set of 13 coaches specifically for the service to Harwich, and this was also the first GER train to be steam heated throughout with Claud Hamilton 4-4-0 steam locomotives providing the motive power.

In 1925 a set of 20 coaches was built at Stratford Works for the Hook Continental, the new train set of eleven bogie coaches having four second class coaches, three first class coaches, three restaurant coaches plus a full brake. In addition two Pullmans were also allocated to the service although only one of the two was used on some occasions. Driving the locomotive that hauled the Hook Continental with this set of coaches was considered a very difficult turn due to the weight of the train and the climbs to Bethnal Green and Brentwood, with speed restrictions through both Chelmsford and Colchester, followed by the severe restriction over the junction at Manningtree. The tare weight was 430 tons with a gross of up to 455 and it constituted the 'top link' (Note: The crews who worked out of engine sheds were organised into links based on seniority. The crews who drove the important express workings were known as Top Link) at Parkeston shed where four engine crews were responsible for this duty. The B12 / "1500" class 4-6-0s were used exclusively and the train was allowed 82 minutes for the 68.9 miles for the down journey.

A further new and more luxurious train set was introduced in 1936 with the same composition as the 1925 set and weighing 443 tons tare, although the change is also reported as the introduction of some new coaches rather than a complete new rake in 1936 with the remaining coaches being replaced in 1938; certainly an additional 10 coaches for the Hook Contienetal were included in the construction programme at York Works in that year. While the formation of the train remained as it had in 1925 it was occasionally increased by an additional bogie coach. Haulage of the train by this time had been taken over by the "Sandringham" or "B17" Gresley 4-6-0s although their performance was never considered greatly superior to the earlier G.E.R 1500s especially after the latter had been fitted with larger boilers.

== World War II and Post-war British Railways ==
The Hook Continental ceased immediately at the outbreak of World War II and the three ships operating the ferry sailings were requisitioned for war service. The train service officially restarted in November 1945 using the same coaches and locomotives as pre-war, but with only three sailings per week. Of the three vessels that had been used pre-war, the SS Amsterdam was lost and the SS Vienna was purchased by the government as a troop carrier leaving the SS Prague as the sole vessel to operate the service.

The train was restored as a daily service in the summer of 1947 with the arrival of the faster and more capacious vessel "Arnhem" from the John Brown Shipyard on Clydebank. The Thompson B1 class 4-6-0s took over the duties at that time from the B17s and continued as the principal locomotive on the train until the advent of the Britannia pacifics after which they were still used for relief services until the withdrawal of steam haulage in the Great Eastern area in 1962.

In the early 1950s six Britannia 4-6-2s worked out of Parkestone Quay shed for boat train traffic and the main train in both directions through the mid-1950s was hauled by these. Although driven by Parkeston crews the actual locomotive allocation was to Stratford who adopted a policy of allocating 70000 Britannia whenever possible. At this time the train weight had grown to 485 tons tare/520 tons gross and the allowed time was actually increased to 90 minutes compared to the 82 minutes of 1912.

With the introduction of train reporting codes, the Hook Continental was considered a Class 1 train (express passenger) and the route between Liverpool Street and Harwich was assigned the letter F giving a headcode in the format 1Fnn. Even numbers indicated down trains and odd numbers up trains.

=== Relief trains ===
During peak traffic periods in the summers of the mid-1950s, particularly on a Friday night, there would be an additional ferry sailing, requiring several relief trains, these usually being hauled by Thompson B1 class. During the summer of 1957 there was a second train, with third-class only accommodation, which was scheduled to run 10 minutes after the main train, and with three further reliefs available as required. Only one of these reliefs would stop at an intermediate station, Colchester, and only the main train was advertised in the timetable. In 1980 there was a separate train shown in the working timetable but not shown in the public timetable running 20 minutes behind the second of the two published trains.

=== Day Continental ===
The LNER introduced a balancing working to the Hook Continental called the Day Continental which left Liverpool Street in the morning and returned from Harwich in the evening.

The last scheduled steam-hauled passenger train to arrive in Liverpool Street was the up Day Continental on 9 September 1962 hauled by a B1 class locomotive and the use of the name Day Continental for a working from Liverpool Street to Harwich in the morning with a return working in the evening continued into the BR diesel era with the timings in 1984 being the exact mirror of those for the Hook Continental. In 1980 the Day Continental was shown as running "as required".

== BR Diesel days ==
From 1958 haulage of the Hook Continental was entrusted to Class 40 diesels after the first batch of 10 locomotives were allocated to Stratford for use on the premier services in East Anglia. After the move of the Class 40s away from East Anglia the train was usually hauled by a Class 37 diesel and from the mid-1970s the consist included one or two BR Mark 1 2nd class Pullmans that had been reclassified as Open Firsts; these were easily identified as the grey upper section stopped short of the recessed doors leaving each end of the coaches all blue. By 1984 the train ran every day departing Parkestone Quay station at 07:50 Monday-Saturday and 07:28 on Sunday in the up direction, and leaving Liverpool Street station at 19:40 in the down direction every day.

=== The end ===
As travel patterns changed, particularly the growth in car accompanied ferry travel and the greater availability of air services, the levels of foot passengers declined and in May 1987 The Hook Continental was discontinued. It was succeeded by a limited stop EMU service to and from Harwich International which was timed to connect with the night Hook of Holland sailings, and which was timetabled and marketed as the Admiral de Ruyter.

== Timings ==
The main train was timed to arrive about 30 to 35 minutes before the ferry sailed and its arrival often coincided with the ferry's mandatory horn test. During that heyday period of steam, a Britannia class locomotive's whistle received an apparent response from the ship. The sounding of the train whistle was a warning to the station staff that it was approaching, obscured from view by the extensive system of sidings, for what would be a busy few minutes as large amounts of mail and baggage were transferred to the ship.

=== Operational problems ===
From an operational perspective, the fact that the evening departures were after the main rush period at Liverpool Street was beneficial, but the up trains in the morning would arrive at the morning peak, and any delays caused by the late arrival of the ferry would create difficulties finding the paths and capacity at Liverpool Street. Various alternative paths were laid down in the working timetable in case of need. One small bonus was that the ferries from the Netherlands enjoyed the cushion of an extra hour for their passage because of the time difference.

== Tickets ==
Except in very exceptional circumstances, passengers were required to hold tickets for the ferry to be allowed to travel on the service. A note in the 1984 BR timetable stated that passengers without a ferry ticket may be barred from boarding.

== Headboards ==
The train initially carried a simple headboard carrying the wording "Hook of Holland" at the top of the smokebox, but this was later changed to read "The Hook Continental", and carried both the British and Dutch flags either side of the definite article. This was also carried at the top of the smokebox. An example of the similar "Day Continental" headboard can be seen at the National Railway Museum.

== See also ==
- Dutchflyer
- List of named passenger trains of the United Kingdom
