= Dover–Dunkerque train ferry =

Train ferry that operated between the United Kingdom and Europe

Coordinates: 51.11333°N 1.31545°E

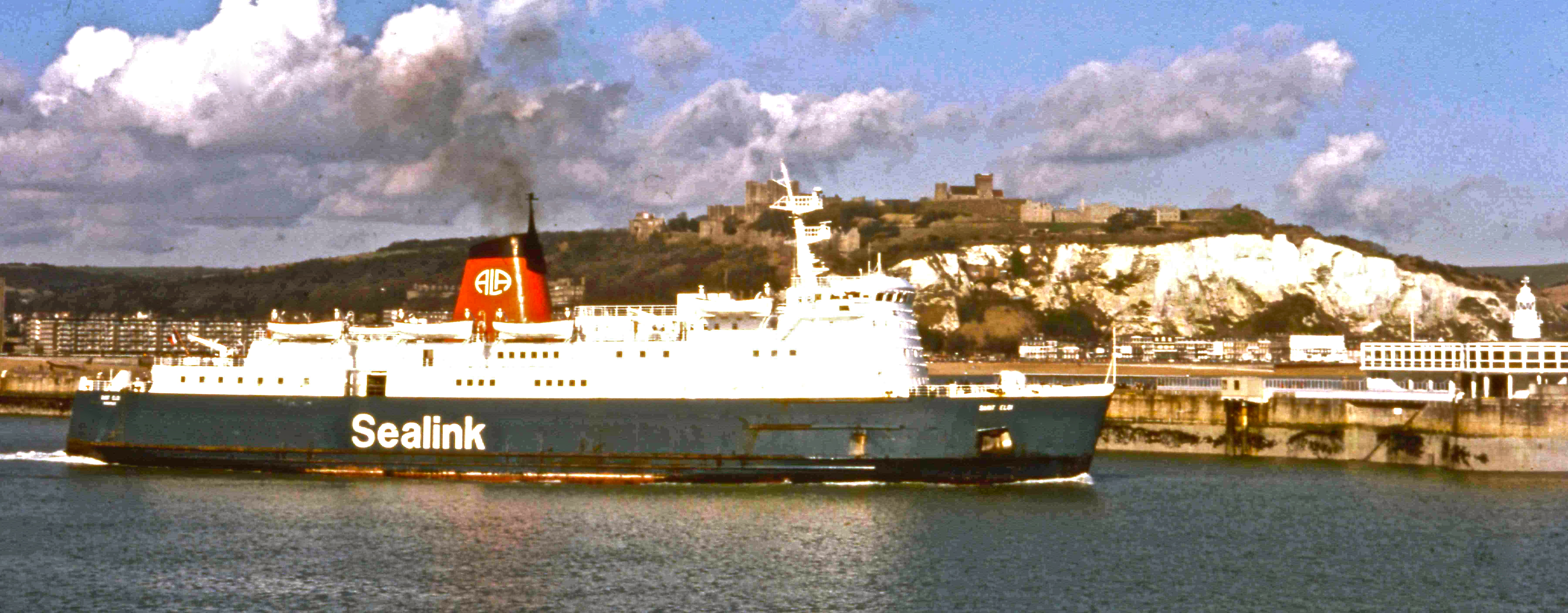
MV St Eloi leaving Dover

The Dover–Dunkerque train ferry was one of two regular rail freight train ferries that operated between the United Kingdom and Europe. (Note: Ferries for train passengers existed in many locations; train ferries that actually carried coaches, locomotives and wagons only operated from Dover and Harwich to the continent. This excludes the wartime shipping of military stores from the Port of Richborough and the Port of Southampton.) The route connected the English port of Dover, with the French port of Dunkerque. After rationalisation of other Anglo-European train ferries, the Dover to Dunkerque sailing was the last to survive, though it ended its days on freight carryings only after the Night Ferry passenger service ended in 1980. The last Dover to Dunkerque wagon-freight ferry service became redundant upon the opening of the Channel Tunnel when freight was carried directly through the Channel Tunnel.

== History ==
Before the First World War, freight being shipped between the Channel ports led to a time-consuming process of shipping from source, unloading onto a ship, re-loading onto rail wagons and then onward delivery on the continent. This ran a significant cost of finance, time and also was detrimental in the amount of labour required to handle the transhipment. During the First World War, despite many innovative efforts to get military supplies to the front (such as small barges sailing across the Channel), the British military established a train ferry at Richborough to enable trains and wagons to be taken onto a ferry without having to transfer the goods from wagons. Other crossings were also established at Southampton, Dover, Newhaven and Liverpool.

Whilst this process was by no means unique in Britain (at least two water crossing train ferries were in operation across the Firths of Forth and Tay until their respective bridges were built), train ferries on the open sea was new to the British railway system.

The London and North Eastern Railway established a Harwich to Zeebrugge train ferry in 1924, using the former ferries and docking equipment as produced for the British military at Southampton and Richborough during the First World War. In 1933, the Southern Railway started on a train ferry terminal in the port at Dover to allow a ro-ro ferry service for trains across the channel to Dunkerque. Dunkerque was chosen above other French ports because of its recently refurbished docks. Initial lightly loaded freight services started in 1936, but a full service for freight did not begin in earnest until 1937, with the Night Ferry passenger service starting a year earlier in 1936. (Note: The Night Ferry was suspended in September 1939 due to the Second World War and was resurrected in 1946. It ceased running completely in 1980.)

Due to the height difference between high and low tides, which could be as much as 23 feet (7 m) in Dover Harbour, a separate dock was created which was protected against the extremes of tidal difference. Additionally, the dock was specially constructed with concrete in the water and a substrate of chalk removed from beneath it. The geological problems of building on the grey chalk (which was found to be riddled with cavities) was a problem that presented itself to the builders of the Channel Tunnel, a venture which brought the train ferry service to an end.

The Night Ferry service last ran in September 1939 due to the onset of the Second World War, and during the war, the three ships that plied the route were redeployed in use by the Royal Navy as mine-laying ships as the advantage of having rails set into the deck, allowed for easy transport onto the ship of the mines.

Competition first came from vehicle only ro-ro ferries in 1952 when a Dover to Boulogne service was started.

In 1988, a new dock and linkspan were installed at Admiralty Pier at Dover. This allowed loading and unloading of the ferry whatever the water level as the linkspan was adaptable for the height variances of the tide. At the same time, a single ship was introduced, the MS Nord Pas-de-Calais, which was capable of a two-hour journey time between the two ports, which resulted in the possibility of up to four sailings each way per day. Loading and unloading at both terminals was undertaken with two locomotives each drawing a train of railway wagons on or off at the same time. This was to prevent the ship shifting under the weight change when wagons were taken away or added. The Nord Pas-de-Calais was built with an open section at the stern of the ship (as were most other train ferry vessels); this allowed for the transport of dangerous goods which could dissipate fumes if they leaked, but also that the wagons that contained the dangerous goods were more accessible in case of emergencies.

== Commodities ==
Freight arriving and departing from the Dover ferry terminal was brought into Dover, or forwarded on, via British Rail's wagonload network (labelled as Speedlink from 1977 to 1991, and as Railfreight Distribution between 1991 and 1995. Traffic imported into Dover via the train ferry included, fruit, chemicals and nuclear fuels between the continent and the BNFL complex at Sellafield.

Exports included china clay from the south west of England to Switzerland and steel products from Teesside to France and Spain. Total tonnage of freight carried between Germany, France, Spain and the United Kingdom in 1993 was almost 706,000 tonnes (778,000 tons). A further 200,000 tonnes (220,000 tons) was transferred between the UK and other countries in Europe.

== Ships ==
The train ferry route utilised a number of ships in its near 60-year history. For the purposes of TOPS (British Rail's numbering system), all the ships were given Class 99 status, except Hampton Ferry which was withdrawn before TOPS was introduced.

Name	TOPS number	Launch date	Withdrawal date (Note: This is date when the vessel was scrapped, sold on or moved permanently away from the train ferry route. Some vessels remained in Sealink or other railway operator control, but did not carry railway vehicles again.)	Notes	Ref
Twickenham Ferry	99 006	March 1934	May 1974	Was HMS Twickenham during the Second World War	
Hampton Ferry		July 1934	November 1969	Was HMS Hampton during the Second World War. She was sold in 1969 but laid up in 1973	
Shepperton Ferry	99 009	October 1934	September 1972	Was HMS Shepperton during the Second World War	
Saint Germain	99 011	1951	1988	Scrapped straight from train ferry service in 1988	
Vortigern	99 007	1969	1988	Some sources state its name as Vortigan. The ship was used sporadically as a train ferry and was finally moved away from the Channel routes in 1984.	
Anderida	99 008	1971	1981	Only operated on the Dover to Dunkerque route for two years 1972–1974	
Chartres	99 012	1974	1993	After being used on the train ferry route on a rolling basis with other routes, she was sold to another ferry company in 1993	
Saint Eloi	99 013	1975	1990	Sold to another ferry company	
Nord Pas-de-Calais	99 001	January 1988	December 1995	Sold to SeaFrance	

Interchangeability with other train ferries was not common; the Harwich to Zeebrugge train ferry used other ships (Suffolk Ferry, Cambridge Ferry, Essex Ferry, and Speedlink Vanguard) which were not used on the Dover to Dunkerque route.

== Closure ==
The train ferry carried its last cargo in December 1995. The opening of the Channel Tunnel prompted the demise of the train ferry to and from Dover, as most flows were re-routed through the tunnel, though its freight loadings have seen lower tonnages than the train ferry carried. Part of the reason for the lower tonnages was down to uncertainty with illegal immigrants, but also crucially, the dangerous goods that the train ferry carried were banned from travelling through the tunnel, so these loads were lost to road transport.

The train ferry dock at Dover has since been partially infilled and was in use as an aggregate terminal in the late 1990s/early 2000s.

== Revival as car ferry service ==
As for the Dover-Dunkerque service in general, the railway ferry shut down in 1995, however in 2000 Maersk subsidiary Norfolkline revived the service. However, whilst the old service was tailored to the needs of the rail freight market, this new service was instead aimed at lorries and road freight. The new service operated by Norfolkline quickly proved to be a breakout success, as the initial one-ship operation expanded to four vessels within five years of the new service opening.

However, even by 2003 Norfolkline forecast a sharp increase in demand for transport on this route, especially with tourists, and as a result sought to aim at a more passenger-oriented market with the route, and ordered three newbuild ships. By 2005 four ships – the Midnight, Dawn, Brave and Northern Merchant were on charter from Norse Merchant Ferries to Norfolkline, however these were heavily oriented towards road freight, as shown by their high lane metres but low pax capacity. It was in October 2005 that the first of the three newbuilds – the Maersk Dunkerque – entered service between Dover and Dunkerque, and slowly, one by one the Merchants were phased out. In 2006, the other two newbuilds – Maersk Delft and Maersk Dover – entered service, and with the triplets in service, the Merchant quad were phased out completely.

In 2010 DFDS bought Norfolkline, and subsequently inherited the Norfolkline network, including the Dover-Dunkerque service. The triplets were then renamed, ditching the Maersk prefix and gaining the Seaways suffix, alongside being repainted into DFDS' house livery. Today, the service continues as a three-ship service under the DFDS banner, as one of two routes operated by the company across the Dover Straits – the other ending in Calais. The service occasionally has seen additional vessels operate to Dunkerque, chiefly when industrial action shuts down the neighbouring Port of Calais, like in 2015 when Calais suffered from strike action around the closure of MyFerryLink.

== In popular culture ==
The Dover to Dunkerque train ferry has appeared in TV, films and books;

- 1938 - The Lady Vanishes (film; seen towards the end)
- 1965 - The Ipcress File (film)
- 1965 - The Night Ferry (book)
- 1967 - The Saint (TV series) S5 E24 “A double in diamonds”
- 1974 - Steptoe and Son (TV series)
