= Golden Arrow (train) =

Luxury British boat train

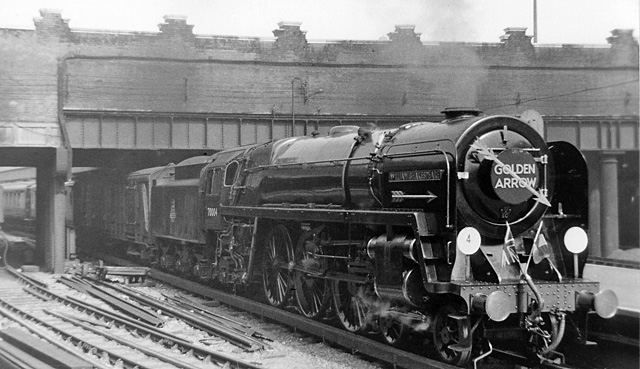
The 'Golden Arrow' leaving Victoria Station, London, in 1953

The Golden Arrow (French: Flèche d'Or) was a luxury boat train of the Southern Railway and later British Railways. It linked London with Dover, where passengers took the ferry to Calais to join the Flèche d'Or of the Chemin de Fer du Nord and later SNCF which took them on to Paris.

== History ==
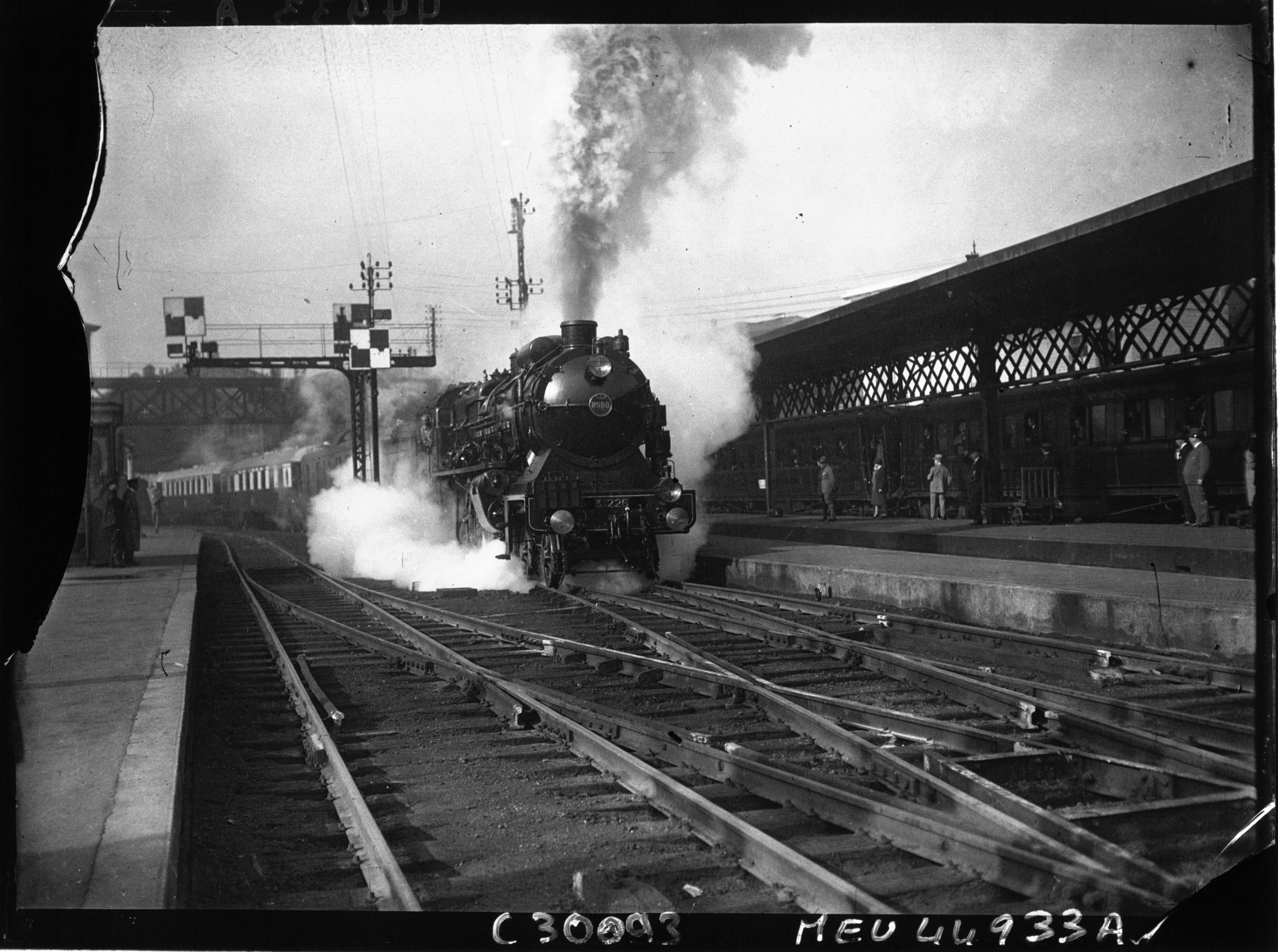
French version of the train, 1927

The Flèche d'Or was introduced in 1926 as an all-first-class Pullman service between Paris and Calais. On 15 May 1929, the Southern Railway introduced the equivalent between London Victoria and Dover while simultaneously launching a new first class only ship, the Canterbury, for the ferry crossing. The train usually consisted of 10 British Pullman cars, hauled by one of the Southern Railway's Lord Nelson class locomotives, and took 98 minutes to travel between London and Dover. Because of the impact of air travel and 'market forces' on the underlying economy of the service, ordinary first- and third-class carriages were added in 1931. Similarly the first-class-only ferry, Canterbury, was modified to allow other classes of passenger.

The train service ceased at the outbreak of the Second World War in September 1939. It resumed after the war on 15 April 1946, initially running with the pre-war Pullmans and the Trianon Bar car, a converted twelve-wheeled Pullman. The Southern railway flagship, the Invicta replaced the Canterbury from 10 October 1946. As of 1949, the all-Pullman train was scheduled to depart from London Victoria at 10:30, with the connecting train from Calais reaching Paris (Gare du Nord) at 17:30, and from Paris at 12:15, with the connecting train from Dover arriving in London at 19:30. This worked out to a scheduled journey time of 6 hours eastbound and 6 hours, 15 minutes, westbound after accounting for the one-hour difference between Greenwich Mean Time and Central European Time.

In 1951, a new set of Pullmans was built, exhibited as part of British Railways' celebration of the Festival of Britain.

In 1961, with the Kent Coast electrification scheme, the train became electric-hauled. That allowed an acceleration to 80 minutes for the down service and 82 minutes for the up service. The last steam hauled train ran on 11 June 1961 hauled by 34100 Appledore. A decline in demand for rail travel between London and Paris saw the last Golden Arrow run on 30 September 1972 and, in its later years, only the first class section was advertised as a Pullman service.

== Preservation ==
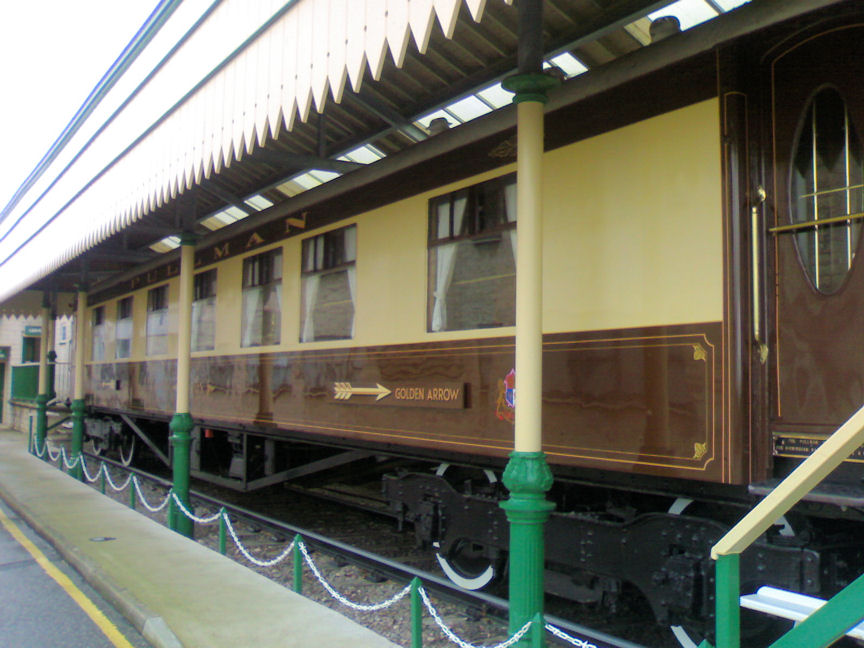
A restored Golden Arrow carriage at Pecorama in Devon

The preserved Bluebell Railway in Sussex runs a Golden Arrow train with Pullman third-class Car No. 64; Pullman first-class cars Christine, Fingall, and Sappho; and an ex-LMS six-wheel brake van.

The main-line service was revived for a one-off event on 6 May 1994 when it formed part of the celebrations for the inauguration of the Channel Tunnel. It was hauled by the steam locomotive Britannia.

The Golden Arrow insignia, of 'Golden Arrow' titles on a green disc with a golden arrow element passing through the two 'O' letters is still a registered trademark and is still today owned by the Department for Transport, officially registered to the Secretary of State for Transport.

== Literary reference ==
In Graham Greene's Travels With My Aunt the character Zachary Wordsworth, suspected by the London Police of drug-trafficking, uses the Golden Arrow to escape to Paris (Ch.4). The book, published in 1969, notes that twenty pounds, given to Wordsworth by the narrator's aunt, were enough to cover the fare to Paris.

== See also ==
- Eurostar – train service via the Channel Tunnel (since 1994)
- Night Ferry – sleeper train between London and Paris/Brussels (1936–1980)
- Silver Arrow (rail-air service) – intermodal passenger transport service between London and Paris (1956–c 1994)
