= SS Shepperton Ferry =

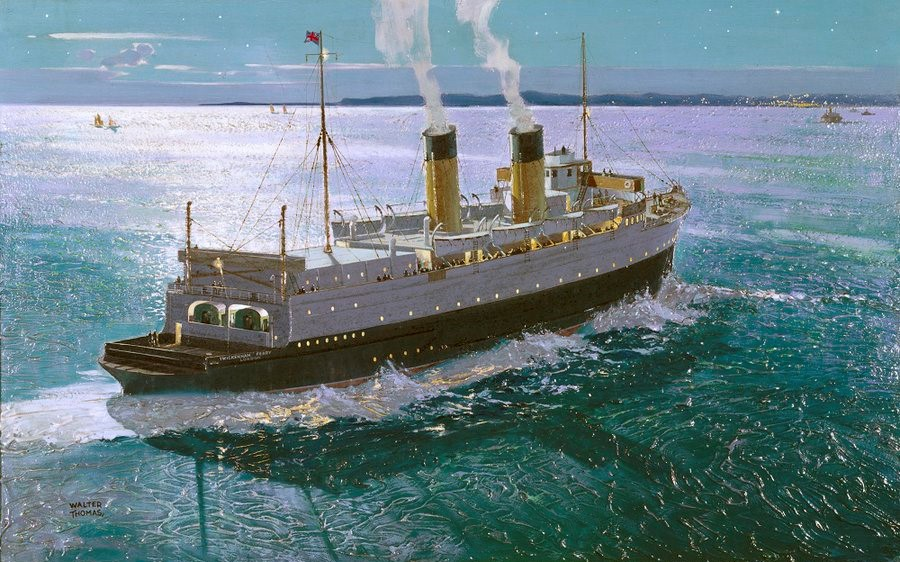
- Sister ship Twickenham Ferry.

History
- Name: Shepperton Ferry (1934–39); HMS Shepperton (1939–40); Shepperton Ferry (1940–72)
- Owner: Southern Railway (1934–39); Royal Navy (1939–40) Ministry of War Transport (1940–45); Southern Railway (1945–47); British Transport Commission (1948–62); British Railways Board (1963–72)
- Operator: Southern Railway (1935–39); Royal Navy (1939–40); Southern Railway (1940–47); British Railways (1948-67); British Rail (1968–72)
- Port of registry: London, United Kingdom (1934–39); Royal Navy (1939–40); (United Kingdom) London (1940–72)
- Builder: Swan, Hunter & Wigham Richardson Ltd
- Yard number: 1450
- Launched: 23 October 1934
- Completed: March 1935
- Identification: United Kingdom Official Number 163583; Code Letters GYJJ; Pennant Number M83 (HMS Shepperton); IMO number: 5322544
- Fate: Scrapped 1972

General characteristics
- Class & type: Train ferry (1934–39); Minelayer (1939–40); Troopship (1940–44); Heavy lift ship (1944–45); Train ferry (1945–72)
- Tonnage: 2,839 GRT, 1,044 NRT
- Length: 346 feet 8 inches (105.66 m)
- Beam: 60 feet 7 inches (18.47 m)
- Draught: 18 feet 6 inches (5.64 m)
- Depth: 18 feet 2 inches (5.54 m)
- Installed power: 4 steam turbines, 948nhp
- Propulsion: 2 screw propellers
- Speed: 16 knots (30 km/h)
- Capacity: 12 sleeping cars or 40 railway wagons, 25 motor cars (100 from 1950), 500 passengers
- Armament: 1 x 4" Anti-Aircraft gun, 2 x .303 machine guns (HMS Shepperton)

Shepperton Ferry was a train ferry built for the Southern Railway in 1934. Requisitioned by the Royal Navy during World War II, she served as the minelayer, troopship and heavy lift ship HMS Shepperton. She was returned to the Southern Railway post-war and saw service with them and their successor British Railways until 1972, when she was scrapped.

== Description ==
The ship was 346 feet 8 inches (105.66 m) long with a beam of 60 feet 7 inches (18.47 m) and a depth of 18 feet 2 inches (5.54 m). Her draught was 18 feet 6 inches (5.64 m). Assessed at 2,839 GRT, 1,044 NRT, she was propelled by four Parsons Turbines of 948 nhp driving twin screw propellers through single reduction gearing. These could propel the ship at 16 knots (30 km/h).

== History ==
Shepperton Ferry was built by Swan Hunter & Wigham Richardson Ltd, Low Walker, Northumberland as Yard Number 1450 for the Southern Railway. Launched on 23 October 1934, she was completed in March 1935 and entered service on the Dover - Dunkerque route. Shepperton Ferry was allocated the Official Number 163583. Her port of registry was London and she was allocated the Code Letters GYJJ. The ship could carry 12 sleeping cars or 40 railway wagons. She also had space for 25 motor cars and 500 passengers. On 21 December 1938, Shepperton Ferry was involved in a collision with a Dutch coaster 7 nautical miles (13 km) off the Dyke Lightship.

In 1939, Shepperton Ferry was requisitioned by the Admiralty and converted to a minelayer for the Royal Navy under the name HMS Shepperton. Her pennant number was M83. She was armed with a 4" anti-aircraft gun and two .303 machine guns and carried 270 mines. She operated in the English Channel. She remained in Royal Naval service until 5 May 1941 when she was declared a Constructive Total Loss after an air raid at Belfast. Other sources state that in 1940, she was transferred to the Ministry of War Transport and regained her original name. She was converted to a troopship and used on the Stranraer - Larne route. In 1944, Shepperton Ferry was converted to a heavy lift ship. She was fitted with a gantry crane which enabled her to lift steam locomotives.

Following the cessation of hostilities, Shepperton Ferry was converted back to a train ferry and returned to the Southern Railway. She returned to the Dover - Dunkerque route. Ownership passed to the British Transport Commission upon the nationalisation of the railways in 1948. In 1950, Shepperton Ferry was fitted with additional flooring on her train deck, which gave her a capacity of 100 motor cars. On 29 November, she struck the submerged wreck of a Royal Navy motor torpedo boat at Dunkerque in a gale. She was freed by five tugs.

Following the loss of Princess Victoria on 31 January 1953, alterations were made to Shepperton Ferry to strengthen her as a result of recommendations made by the court of inquiry into that disaster.

In each of the years between 1962 and 1965, Shepperton Ferry spent up to a month on the Stranraer - Larne route. With the introduction of IMO Numbers in the late 1960s, she was allocated the IMO Number 5322544. was withdrawn from service on 26 August 1972 and laid up at Dover before being sold to Hierro Ardes SA, Bilbao, Spain for scrapping. Shepperton Ferry arrived at Bilbao for scrapping on 17 September 1972.
