= MS Limon =

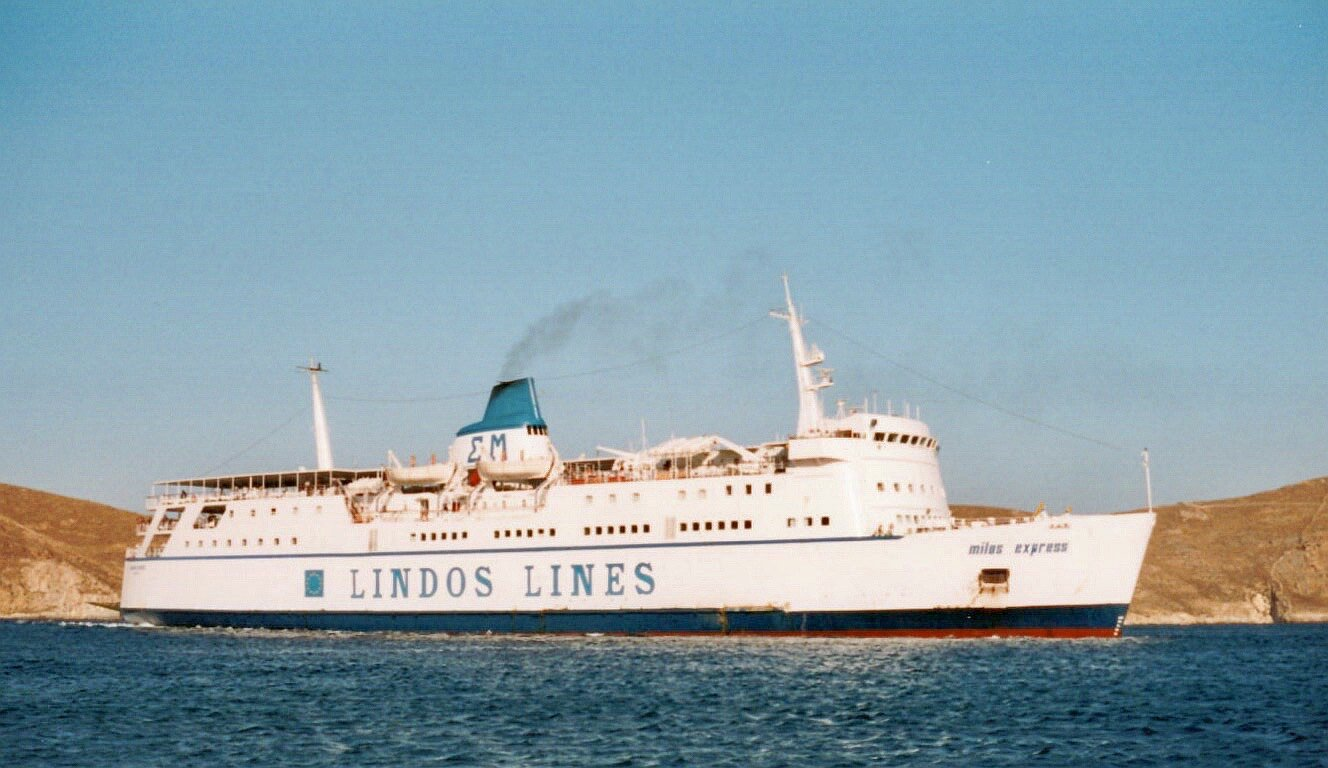
- Milos Express in Serifos

History
- Name: Vortigern (1969–88); Milos Express (1988–2000); Express Milos (2000–03); Nisos Lemnos (2003–04); Limon (2004–05)
- Namesake: Vortigern
- Owner: British Transport Commission (1969–79); Sealink (1979–84); Sea Containers (1984–88); Lindos Line (1988–99); Minoan Flying Dolphins (1999–2003); Saos Sipping Company (2003–05)
- Operator: BR Sealink (1969–79); Sealink (1979–84); Sea Containers (1984–87); Townsend Thoresen (1987); Sea Containers (1987–88); Lindos Line (1988–99); Minoan Flying Dolphins (1999–2000); Hellas Ferries (2000–03); Saos Sipping Company (2003–05)
- Port of registry: (United Kingdom) London, England (1969–88); Piraeus, Greece (1988–2004); Kingstown, Saint Vincent and the Grenadines (2004–05)
- Route: see text
- Builder: Swan Hunter
- Cost: £2.5 million (1969) (equivalent to £46.3 million in 2024)
- Yard number: 10
- Launched: 5 March 1969
- Completed: July 1969
- Maiden voyage: 31 July 1969
- Out of service: September 2004
- Identification: United Kingdom Official Number 337888 (1969–88); IMO number: 6910960
- Fate: Scrapped 2005

General characteristics
- Class & type: Train ferry / roll-on/roll-off ferry
- Tonnage: 4,797 GRT, 2,144 NRT, 908 DWT
- Length: 380 feet 0 inches (115.82 m)
- Beam: 63 feet 0 inches (19.20 m)
- Draught: 13 feet 6 inches (4.11 m)
- Installed power: 2 x 16 cylinder Pielstick diesel engines, 7,280 horsepower (5,430 kW) each
- Propulsion: 2 screw propellers
- Speed: 19.5 knots (36.1 km/h)
- Capacity: 250 motor cars, 1,000 passengers (Vortigern)

Vortigern was a 4,797 GRT combined train and roll-on/roll-off ferry built by Swan Hunter in 1969 for the British Railways Board. She was sold to Greece in 1988 and served until 2004 under the names Milos Express, Express Milos and Nisos Lemnos. She was renamed Limon in 2004 and reflagged to Saint Vincent and the Grenadines. Limon was scrapped in 2005.

== Description ==
As built, the ship was 380 feet 0 inches (115.82 m) long, with a beam of 63 feet 0 inches (19.20 m) and a draught of 13 feet 6 inches (4.11 m). She was propelled by two 16-cylinder Crossley-Pielstick, 16 PC2V 450 diesel engines producing 7,280 horsepower (5,430 kW) each. The engines drove twin screw propellers and could propel the ship at 19.5 knots (36.1 km/h). The ship had a capacity of 250 motor cars and 1,000 passengers. She could carry 30 railway wagons or ten carriages and eleven wagons.

== History ==
Costing £2,500,000, Vortigern was built by Swan Hunter, Wallsend as yard number 10. Named after the 5th-Century King of the Britons, she was launched on 5 March 1969 and completed in July. Built for the British Transport Commission for operation by British Rail Sealink, she entered service on 31 July 1969. She was allocated the IMO Number 6910960, and United Kingdom Official Number 337888. Her port of registry was London. Vortigern was the last train ferry built for British Rail. Built as a dual purpose train and roll-on/roll-off ferry, Vortigern served on the Dover to Boulogne route during the summer season, and on the Dover to Dunkerque route during the winter season. On 22 May 1971, Vortigern was chartered by the International Railway Congress and made a voyage from Southend Pier Essex to Greenwich, London. The train track configuration in her hold can be seen in the 1973 drama Don Juan.

On 1 January 1979, Vortigern was registered to Sealink. She served on the Folkestone to Boulogne route. On 16 January 1983, the ship suffered an engine fire, which took her out of service for four weeks. At 05:42 on 4 March 1982, Vortigern ran aground on a breakwater at Ostend, Belgium. Her passengers were disembarked by lifeboat. She was later refloated with assistance from five tugs. After repairs in Amsterdam, Netherlands, which cost over £1 million, she returned to service on 22 April. In July 1982, she ran aground at Folkestone.

Vortigern was registered to Sea Containers, London in 1984. She served on the Dover to Dunkerque route from March 1985, switching to the Folkestone to Boulogne route in 1986. On 10 January 1987, she entered service on the Fishguard Harbour - Rosslare route. From April to June she was operated on the Dover - Calais route under charter to Townsend Thoresen, following the loss of the Herald of Free Enterprise on 6 March 1987. Following the entry of Pride of Dover into Townsend Thoresen service, Vortigern was then laid up in the River Fal, Cornwall.

From June to September 1987, Vortigern was in service on the Newhaven to Dieppe route, then on the Folkestone to Boulogne route from until January 1988. In October 1988, she was in service on the Holyhead to Dún Laoghaire route.

On 1 April 1988, Vortigern was sold to Lindos Line SA, Piraeus, Greece and was renamed Milos Express (Greek: ΜΗΛΟΣ ΕΞΠΡΕΣ). She was operated primarily on the Piraeus - Kythnos - Serifos - Sifnos - Milos route. On 11 December 1999, Milos Express was sold to Minoan Flying Dolphins, Piraeus. She was renamed Express Milos (Greek: ΕΞΠΡΕΣ ΛΗΜΝΟΣ) in January 2000 and entered service under the Hellas Ferries brand, continuing on the same route.

In May 2003, Express Milos was sold to Saos Shipping Company and renamed Nisos Lemnos. Due to the Greek authorities imposing a 35-year age limit on Greek ferries, her time with Saos was limited to two seasons. Following withdrawal from service, she was laid up at Lavrion. She was sold to Indian shipbreakers in September 2004. The ship was reflagged to Saint Vincent and the Grenadines in December 2004 and renamed Limon. She arrived at Alang, India on 13 January 2005 for scrapping, and was beached on 24 January. Scrapping took a mere couple of weeks.
