= Michaelstowe Hall =

Country house in Ramsey, Essex, England

Coordinates: 51°55′50″N 1°13′40″E

Michaelstowe Hall is a manor house in the village of Ramsey near Harwich, Essex, England.

The present Michaelstowe Hall dates from 1903, but the Michaelstowe Estate has a long and varied history which can readily be traced back to the Domesday Book of 1086. Located a few hundred yards to the east of Ramsey Parish Church, Essex, Michaelstowe Hall is set back from the main Harwich road in 17 acres of landscaped grounds.

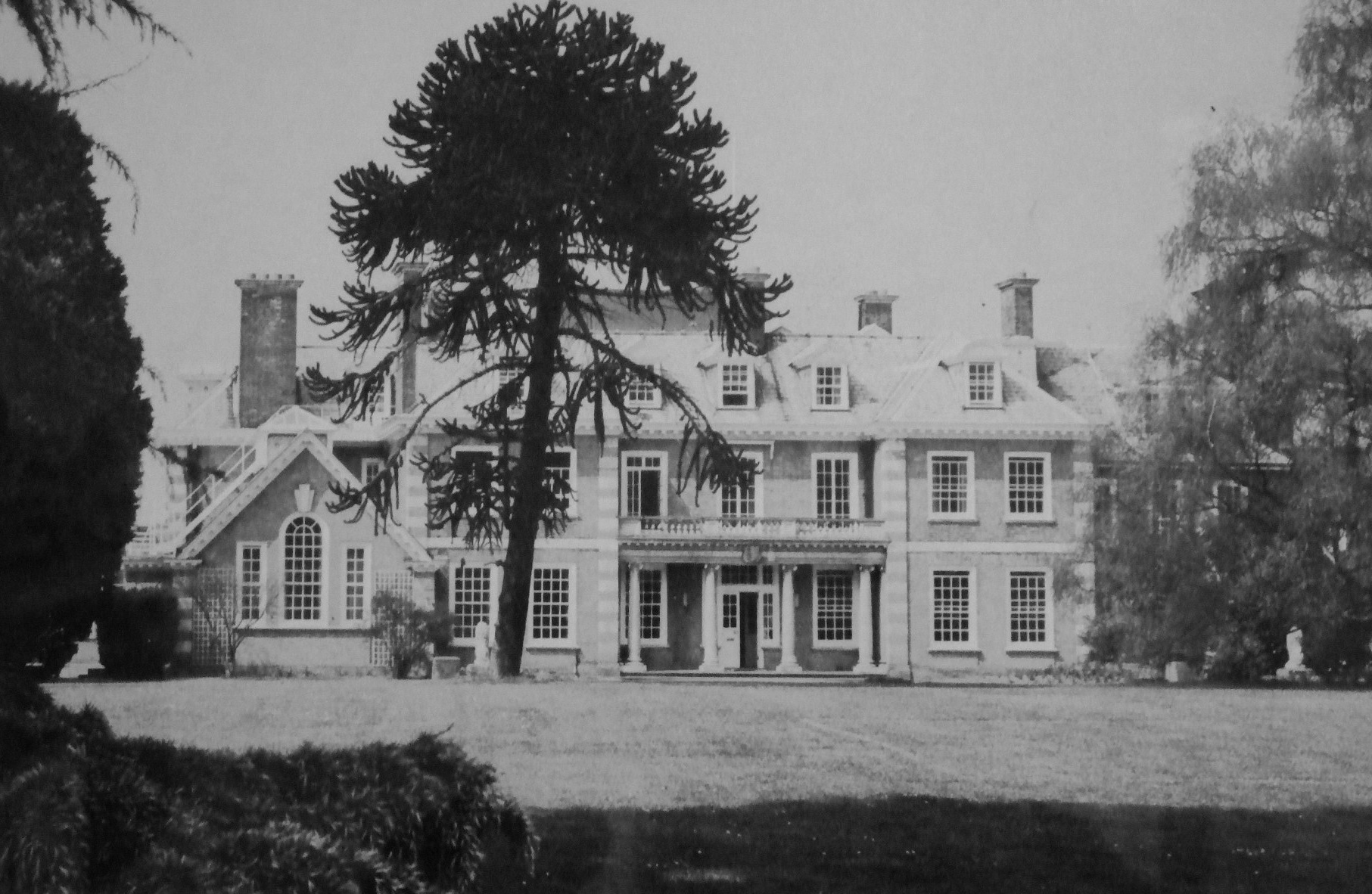
Michaelstowe Hall

Grade II listed in 1987, the main three-storey 1903 structure is of red Berkshire brick with white stone facings and a slated roof. Electric lighting was provided from the private lighting plant located near the stables. The main residence included seven family bedrooms, two fitted bathrooms, and a billiards room. A luggage lift and speaking tube served all three floors. The stable block is surmounted by a clock tower and provided stalls for eight horses and a garage for three motor cars or carriages.

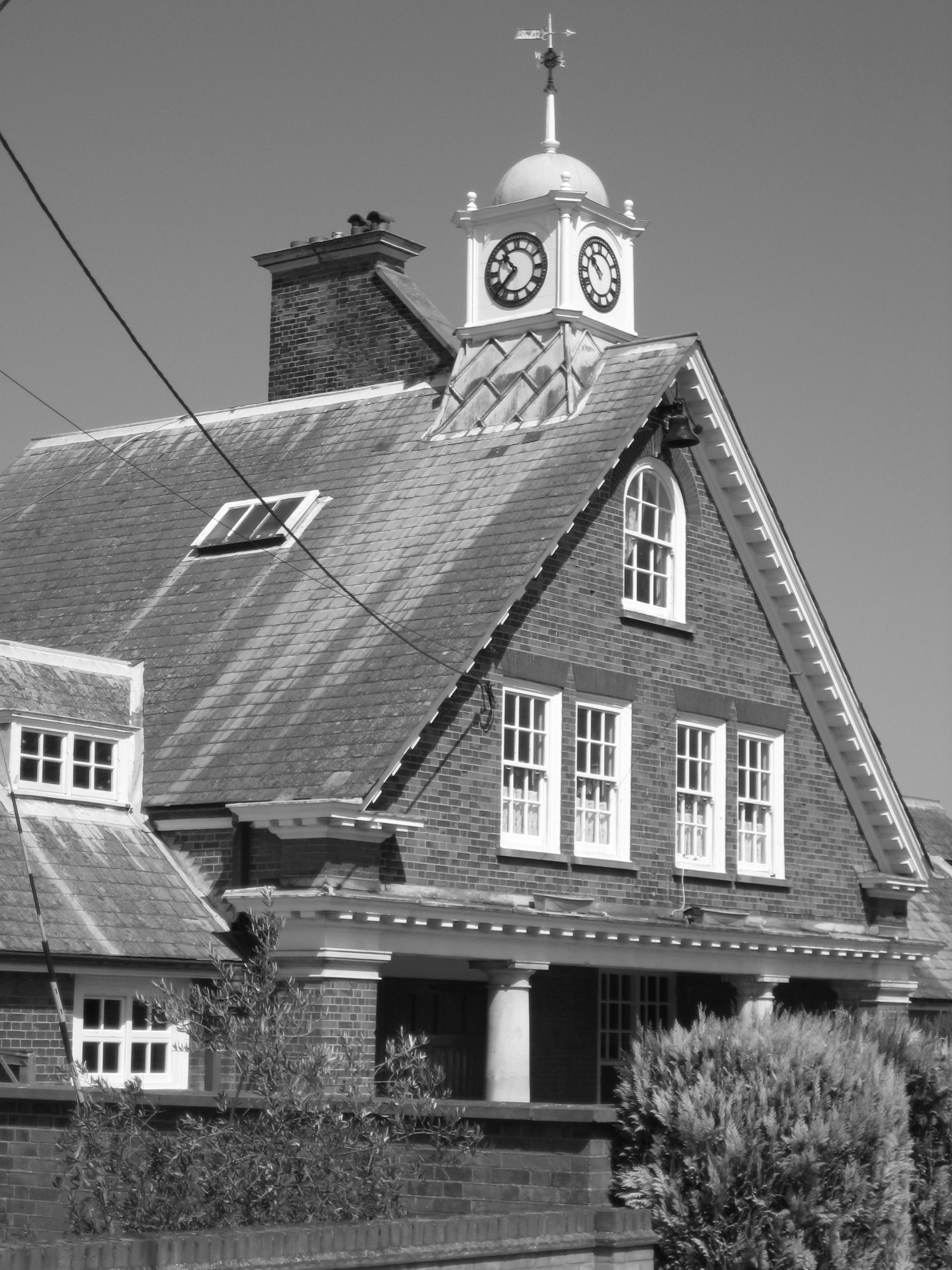
Michaelstowe Hall Stables

The 1777 Andre and Chapman map of Essex shows an earlier Michaelstow Hall on the main road immediately adjacent to St. Michael's church at the top of Ramsey Hill, four hundred yards west of the current location. This earlier building mysteriously disappears completely from local maps around 1850.

In February 2011 Michaelstowe Hall was sold to Southend Care Ltd. Since new ownership it has been renamed as Ramsay Manor. Ramsay Manor has had extensive refurbishment in order to modernise the building to bring it to the forefront of elderly residential care.

== 1086-1750 ==
=== Domesday Book ===
The Domesday Book records two parcels of land in the area, "Michaelstou" and "Ramefeia".

These were later divided into seven manors: those of Roydon Hall, Ramsey Hall, Michaelstowe, East New Hall, Strondland, Le Rey (Ray Island), and Foulton. A manor is defined as a division of countryside, each manor being subject to a lord who held a manorial court and governed by public law and local custom.

In 1379 King Richard II granted licence to give 200 acres of Michaelstowe to the Monastery of Saint Osyth, but following the dissolution of the monasteries, the manor was divided with a "moiety" (half) being granted to Robert Carey, 1st Earl of Monmouth, and a "moiety" to Sir George Whitmore. Sir George Whitmore was Lord Mayor of London in 1631.

=== William Whitmore ===
William Whitmore succeeded his father George as lord of the manor of Michaelstowe in 1652. He died in 1678 and is buried in the churchyard at Ramsey. The estate then passed to his young son (also named William). However soon after, the young William Whitmore was killed when a pistol accidentally misfired in the carriage he was traveling in. As William died under age and without issue, the Michaelstowe Estate passed to trustees and was later sold to Sir Thomas Davall, MP for Harwich from 1695 to 1708.

Sir Thomas died in 1712 leaving the estate to his two infant sons but following a lengthy legal case the estate was granted to a cousin, Daniel Burr, on 30 May 1722. In 1750 Daniel Burr sold the estate to Nathaniel Garland, a wealthy mercer, who became first member of the Garland family to become lord of the manor of Michaelstowe.

== 1750-1920: Garland family ==
For nearly two hundred years from 1750 to 1920, Michaelstowe Hall was occupied by five generations of the Garland family:

- Nathaniel Garland (1684–1756) Elected Master of the Mercers Company in the City of London in 1738. His father, also Nathaniel, was married to Mary Elphick from whose family the Garlands also inherited the Barcombe estate near Lewes, Sussex.
- Lewes Peake Garland (1732–1778) Lewes was forty years old when he married Indiana Talbot from Durham in 1773. Two years later his eldest son Nathaniel was born but Lewes died in 1778 just before the birth of his second son. Indiana died in 1787 and the two boys were brought up by guardians at Michaelstowe Hall and were educated at Eton and Christ Church Oxford. (According to Cambridge University Alumni Lewes matriculated at Clare College on 21 Mar 1753)
- Nathaniel Garland (1775–1845) was also forty years old when he married Anna Cope from Armagh, Ireland, in 1814. The couple divided their time between their London home in Harley Street, Michaelstowe Hall in Essex, and also their estate in Surrey. Nathaniel was appointed Deputy Lieutenant of Essex in 1819 and High Sheriff of Essex in 1824. Their eldest son, Edgar Walter, born in 1814 was the first of the couple's ten children. Nathaniel died at his London home in January 1845 age 70.
- Edgar Walter Garland (1814–1902) was lord of the manor when the Eastern Union Railway, later the Great Eastern Railway, built the line from Manningtree to Harwich, much of it across land owned by the Garlands. The line opened in 1854. Some twenty years later in 1875 the board of GER decided to build their own quay up river from Harwich. Negotiations with Edgar Garland resulted in a further 50 acres of Ray Island being sold to the Railway Board for this purpose. The docks and the newly created village were named after the Charles H. Parks, chairman of the Great Eastern Railway Company and the new Parkeston Quay opened for shipping in March 1883. Edgar Garland died without issue in 1902, and was succeeded by his nephew Arthur Nathaniel Garland.
- Arthur Nathaniel Garland (1847–1942) oversaw the building of the current Michaelstowe Hall in 1903. In 1904 he married his second wife Evelyn Lisa Chavalley, the daughter of a French aristocrat and his son Victor Nathaniel Garland was born in 1905. The census from 1911 shows four daughters from Arthur's first marriage also resident at Michaelstowe Hall along with 10 servants, including a butler, first footman, second footman, nurse, cook/housekeeper and five housemaids.

== 1920-1947 ==
=== 1920 sale ===
The Garland's link with Michaelstowe Hall ended in 1920, when the 2,250 acres of the Michaelstowe estate were put up for sale by auction by Hampton and Sons at the Corn Exchange in Colchester. The estate at that time owned land and farms across Bradfield, Wrabness and Ramsey as well as the Dovercourt Golf Course and the Garland Hotel in Parkeston.

=== Richard Combe Abdy ===
Following the 1920 sale, Michaelstowe Hall was acquired by Richard Combe Abdy (1869–1938), a wealthy businessman with interests in cotton and banking. He also owned property abroad including homes in Alexandria, Egypt, and in Switzerland. During his ownership of Michaelstowe Hall sixty gardeners were employed to help maintain the grounds and there is a well known tale of Squire Abdy offering £1 to any of his guests who could find a single weed anywhere on the estate.

During the 1920s the house and gardens were extensively improved and extended by Mr Abdy who also spent a vast sum on creating a rock garden around the ornamental lake. The grounds were notable for a collection of rare flowering and evergreen shrubs. The gardens were well known throughout the county and the ornamental rock garden around the lake was described as probably the finest in the country.

A successful businessman, Mr Abdy began his career at Barings Brothers bank in London. He later went on to found the National Bank of Egypt, and became chairman of several other Egyptian insurance and investment companies. He was twice president of the British Chamber of Commerce in Egypt. Well known for his good humour and hospitality, his many house guests at Michaelstowe Hall included representatives from Harwich Police, and officers from visiting warships. Boy Scouts and Girl Guides from Harwich were invited to hold annual camps in the grounds. As High Steward of Harwich, Mr Abdy took a valued part in local affairs and one of his civic duties was to open the Dovercourt Band Enclosure on 14 July 1929 (later known as the Cliffs Pavilion). Mr. Abdy died in Cairo in March 1938 from heart failure, aged 69. He was unmarried.

=== 1932 sale ===
Michaelstowe Hall was up for sale again in July 1932 at an auction held by Knight, Frank, and Rutley in Hanover Square, London. The freehold passed to Francis Edward Harris, previously owner of the Towers Hotel in Clacton. He lived at Michaelstowe Hall with his wife Elsie Winifred Harris and their six children until March 1938 when Mr Harris completed the sale of Michaelstowe Hall to Essex County Council and moved into "Elcombe", a large modern house in Mayes Lane, Ramsey, on land which had previously formed part of the Michaelstowe Estate.

=== Essex County Council ===
Michaelstowe Hall and the surrounding 117 acres were purchased by Essex County Council for use as a convalescent home and the County Convalescent Home, Dovercourt opened in November 1938. Minutes show that an additional allowance of five shillings per head was made for additional fare for Christmas 1938, excluding the cost of turkeys. By April 1940 thirty patients were resident in the home.

In 1941 Michaelstowe Hall and grounds were requisitioned by the Admiralty.

After the war in 1946, following negotiations with the War Office, the property was relinquished back to Essex County Council and responsibility was given over to the Education Department as a new home for Chafford School.

== 1947–present ==
=== Chafford School ===
In 1947 Chafford Approved School transferred to Michaelstowe Hall from its original premises in Coxtie Green near Brentwood (Coxtie Green is located in Chafford Hundred, hence the school name)

Approved Schools were residential institutions to which young people could be sent by a court, usually for committing offences but sometimes because they were deemed to be beyond parental control. The term came into use following the Children and Young Persons Act 1933 when Approved Schools were created out of the earlier "industrial" or "reformatory" schools. They were essentially "open" institutions, modelled on ordinary boarding schools, from which it was relatively easy to abscond.

Chafford School had been established as an Approved School for boys by Essex County Council in 1942, and received its Certificate of Approval under the 1933 CYP Act in August 1942. Mr and Mrs Harold Conway were appointed as first head and matron and admissions commenced in November 1942. By November 1943 fifty two boys aged 12–15 were in residence. Following the move to Michaelstowe Hall in 1947 the school gradually expanded to take a maximum of 91 boys in the 1970s, mainly from the East London area.

Full-time education was provided in a block of prefabricated army huts leased from the nearby Army Transit Camp, but older boys had the opportunity to learn a trade such as painting and decorating, bricklaying, or carpentry. The school also provided excellent sporting facilities, including one of the best cricket grounds in the area.

Following a change of government policy during the 1980s towards more community-based services Approved Schools (now known as Community Home Schools) were in decline. By 1984 occupancy at Chafford School had fallen to only 22 and Essex Social Services Committee took the decision to close the school with effect from July 1985.

=== Residential care home ===
In August 1986 Michaelstowe Hall was sold by Essex County Council to Residential Care and Nursing Homes Ltd from Ipswich and the building subsequently re-opened as a residential care home for the elderly.

Michaelstowe Hall was sold to the Vive-Kananda Estate under Essex County Care Ltd, it was renamed Ramsay Manor and now provides residential care for the senior living.
