= Harwich International Port =

Port in Essex, England

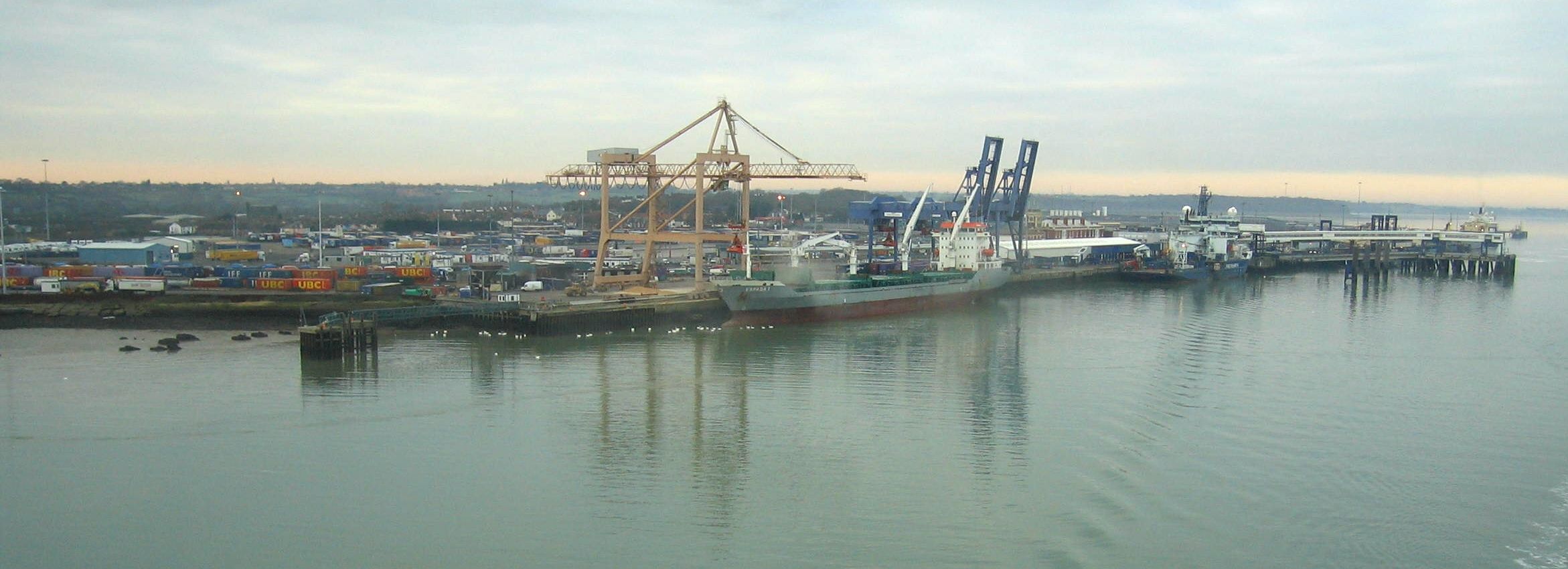
- 2007 view of Harwich International Port from the north-east
- Interactive map of Harwich International Port
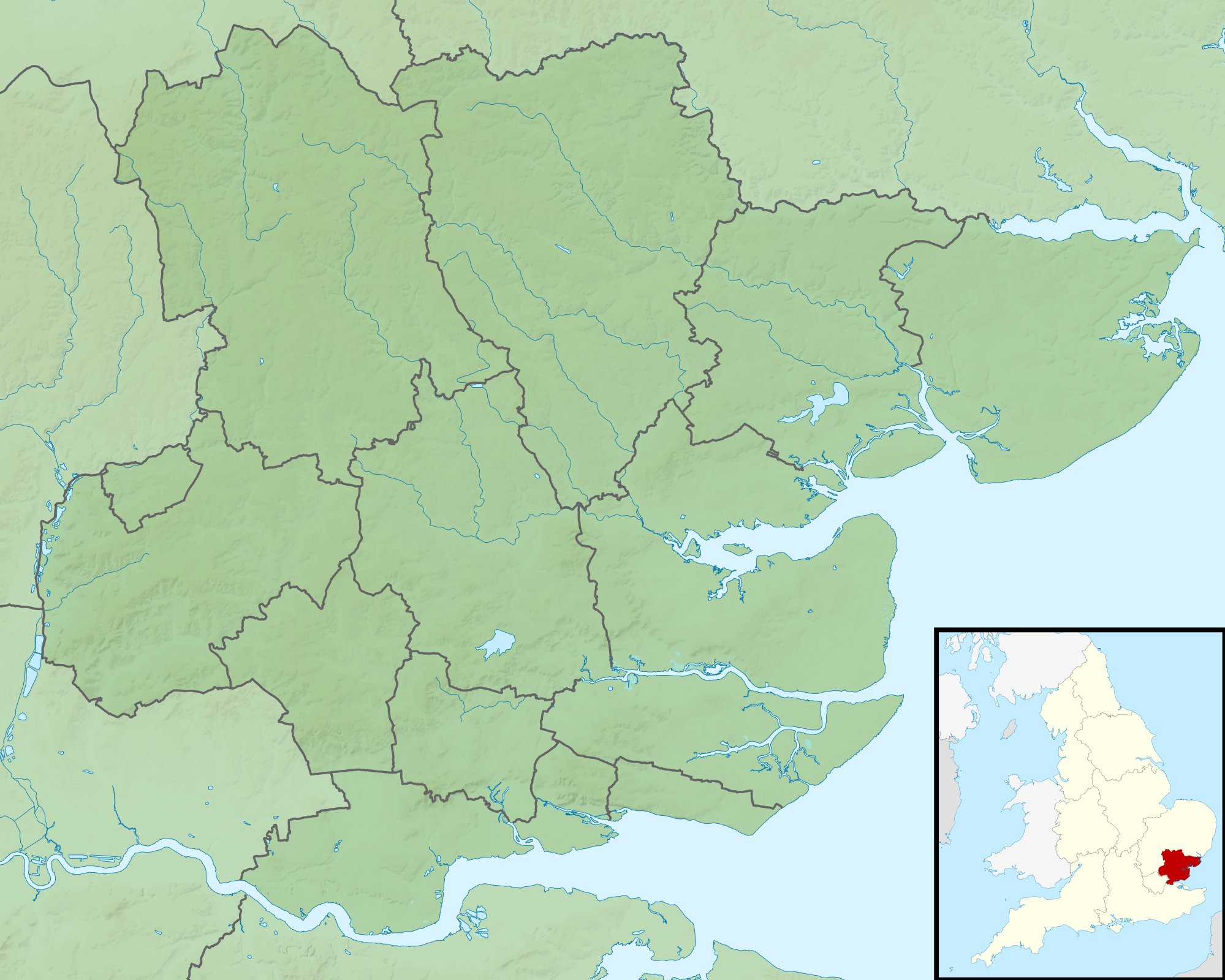
- Location within Essex

Location
- Location: River Stour, Essex, England
- Coordinates: 51°56′53″N 1°15′18″E

Details
- Opened: 1883; 143 years ago (as Parkeston Quay)
- Owned by: Hutchison Port Holdings
- Type of Harbor: Seaport
- Land area: 105 acres (42 ha)
- No. of berths: 4
- Rail lines: Mayflower

Statistics
- Website www.harwich.co.uk

Harwich International Port is a North Sea seaport in Essex, England, and one of the Haven ports. It lies on the south bank of the River Stour 1 mile (1.5 kilometres) upstream from the town of Harwich, opposite the Port of Felixstowe. The port was formerly known as Parkeston Quay.

== History ==
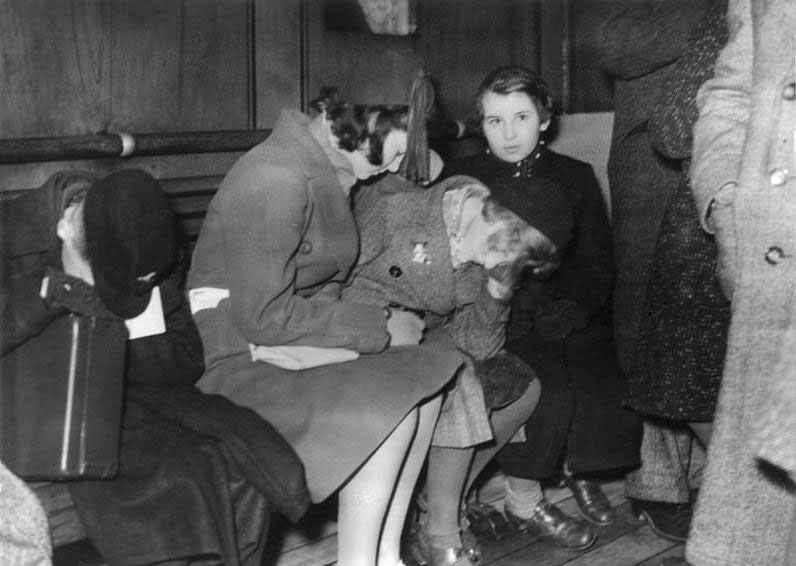
Young Jewish refugees of the first Kindertransport, tired on their arrival at Harwich in the early morning of 2 December 1938

The Great Eastern Railway, which was formed from the merging of the Eastern Counties Railway and the Eastern Union Railway in 1862, operated passenger steamers across the North Sea from Harwich to continental Europe. By 1872, shipping trade had increased so that more capacity was required and the Great Eastern Railway obtained permission to reclaim land at Ray Farm, a mile to the west of Harwich, and build a new quay. This new quay was opened in 1883 by Charles H. Parkes, the chairman of the Great Eastern Railway company, the port being named after him as Parkeston Quay. The port had its own railway station, and a hotel was built between the northern platform and the quay; the hotel building is now used as offices. The railway station was originally called Parkeston Quay, but was renamed Harwich Parkeston Quay in 1934 when the new Parkeston Quay West station was opened to serve the west end of the quay. It was given its current name, Harwich International, in 1995.

The port remained under the ownership of the Great Eastern Railway until 1923 when the company became part of the London and North Eastern Railway (LNER). In 1939 the Admiralty requisitioned Parkeston Quay for naval purposes, naming it HMS Badger. It was released back to the LNER in 1946.

On 1 January 1948 the LNER was nationalised and the port came under the ownership of British Railways (BR). In 1984, as part of the privatisation of BR's Sealink ferry services, the port was sold to Sealink's new owners Sea Containers, which sold it on to Stena Line in 1989. In 1997 Parkeston Quay was acquired by Hutchison Port Holdings, which renamed the port Harwich International Port.

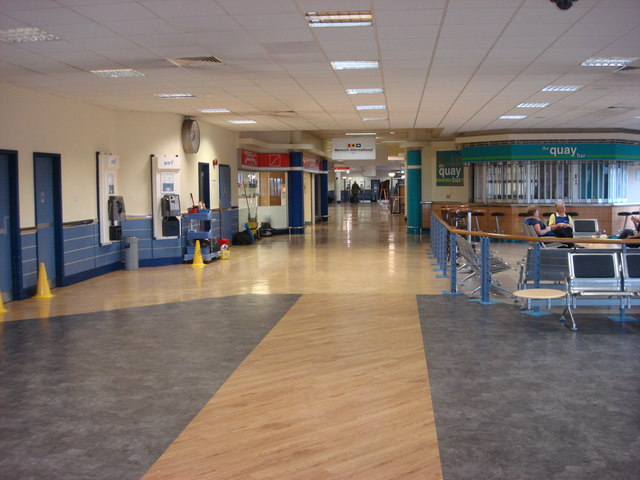
Interior of the terminal in 2008

== Current operations ==
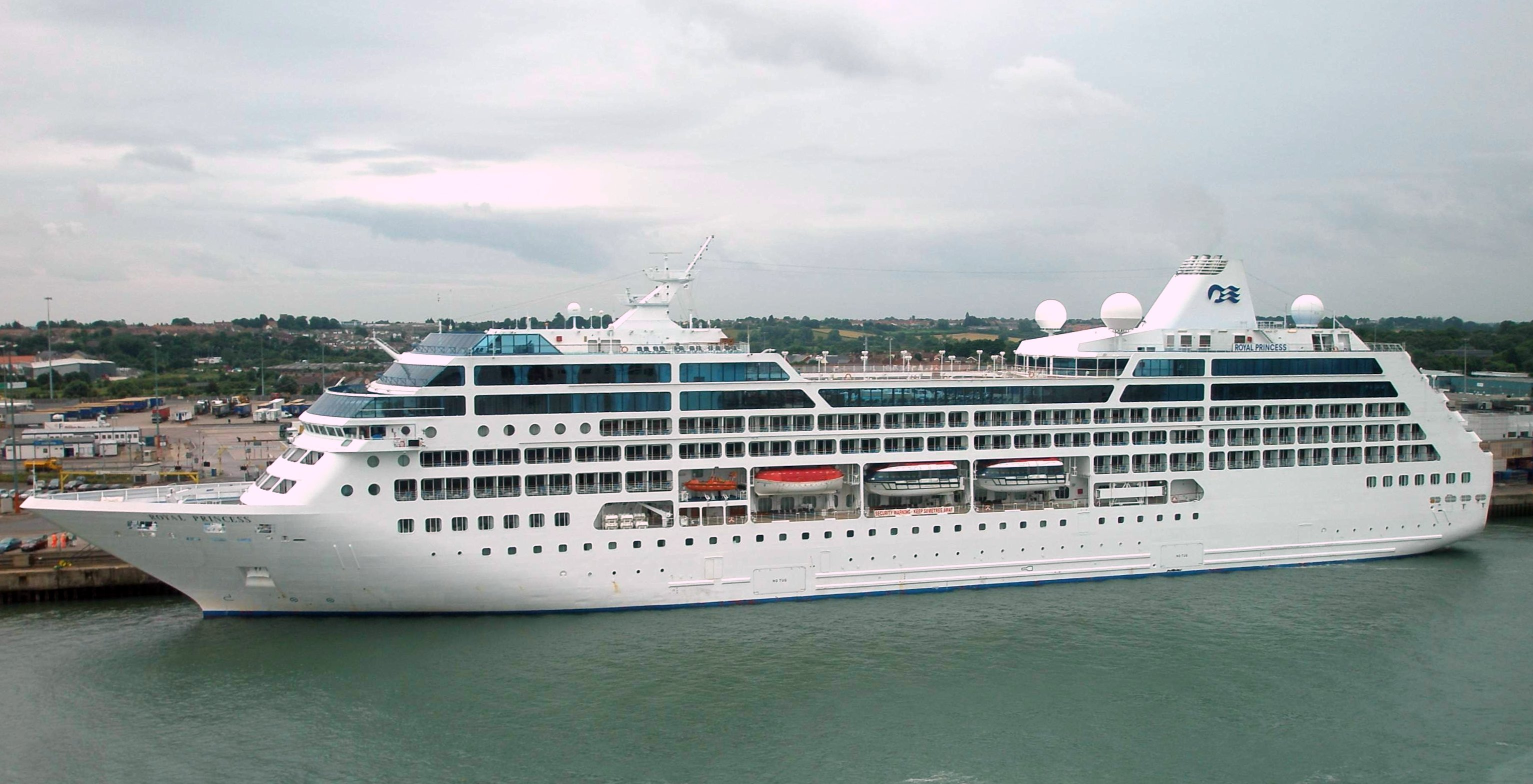
The cruise ship Royal Princess at the port

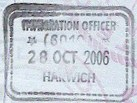
Passport stamp

The main user of the port is the regular ferry services of Stena Line who run twice daily passenger and freight services to the Hook of Holland; as well as freight only services to Rotterdam Europort. The main vessels serving the port are the RoPax ferries the Stena Hollandica and the Stena Britannica, and the RoRo ferries.

Previously, DFDS Seaways operated services to Esbjerg, Denmark (ceased 29 September 2014), Cuxhaven (and before that to Hamburg), Germany, and Gothenburg, Sweden; the latter two services were discontinued by 2005.

Cruise ships once called regularly at the port during the summer months, although in recent times these calls have become more and more infrequent. The year 2016 saw 12 visits – the lowest since the service started. While the majority of opinion puts this down to the recent economic downturn, others feel the reason is the lack of facilities for visitors when compared to the likes of Southampton or Dover. Tankers call at the Carless refinery, and some general cargo and bulk cargos are worked at the port.

As of May 2010, the port was the base for the installation of the offshore Greater Gabbard wind farm and Thanet Wind Farm in the southern North Sea, and has also been used for Gunfleet Sands Offshore Wind Farm.

The operations and maintenance base for the Galloper wind farm is housed in the port and is made up of a dedicated pontoon, warehouse and office space.

== Facilities ==
There are four ro-ro berths with linkspans. The specialised pier for the High Speed Ferry Discovery is disused now that the high-speed ferry service has been discontinued and its linkspan has been removed. There are extensive railway sidings adjacent to and within the port with 40 acres (16 hectares) of standing for cars including electric vehicle charging points. In total, there are over 105 acres (42 hectares) of operational land with parking for over 1,000 trailers.
