= Ramsey and Parkeston =

- Civil parish
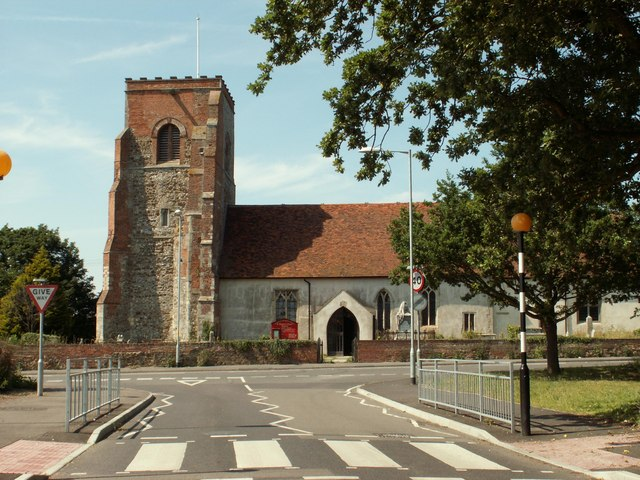
- Ramsey church
- Interactive map of Ramsey and Parkeston
- Coordinates: 51.928773°N 1.2166178°E
- Country: England
- Primary council: Tendring
- County: Essex
- Region: East of England
- Status: Parish
- Main settlements: Ramsey and Parkeston

Area
  - Total: 15.99 km^{2} (6.17 sq mi)

Population (Parish, 2021)
  - Total: 2,383
  - Density: 149.0/km^{2} (386.0/sq mi)
- Website: https://www.ramseyparkeston-pc.gov.uk/

Ramsey and Parkeston (formerly just Ramsey) is a civil parish in the Tendring district, in the county of Essex, England. The parish includes the villages of Ramsey and Parkeston. The neighbouring parishes are Arwarton, Great Oakley, Harkstead, Harwich, Little Oakley, Wix and Wrabness. There are 13 listed buildings in the parish. At the 2021 census the parish had a population of 2,383.

== History ==
On 12 January 1979 it was renamed from "Ramsey" to "Ramsey and Parkeston".
