= Parkeston, Essex =

Village in Essex, England

Coordinates: 51.9407°N 1.2531°E

Parkeston
- Location within Essex
- Area: 0.708 km^{2} (0.273 sq mi)
- Population: 932 (2018 estimate)
  - Density: 1,316/km^{2} (3,410/sq mi)
- OS grid reference: TM236319
- Civil parish: Ramsey and Parkeston
- District: Tendring
- Shire county: Essex
- Region: East
- Country: England
- Sovereign state: United Kingdom
- Post town: HARWICH
- Postcode district: CO12
- Dialling code: 01255
- Police: Essex
- Fire: Essex
- Ambulance: East of England
- UK Parliament: Harwich and Essex North

Parkeston /ˈpɑːrkstən/ is a North Sea port village in Essex, England, situated on the south bank of the River Stour about one mile (1.6 km) up-river from Harwich. In 2018 it had an estimated population of 932.

== History ==
In the 1880s, reclaimed land that had been Ray Island was developed by the Great Eastern Railway Company (GER) as a railway depot for import/export trade with the European mainland. The new port was named Parkeston Quay, after Charles Henry Parkes (1816–1895), Chairman of the GER. The existing railway line was re-routed to pass through the port, although the original railway embankment, through an overgrown area known locally as The Hangings, still exists. Most of the terraced housing in Parkeston was built for railway employees and some of the streets in the village have names that can be theoretically linked to the shipping and general activities of the railway, examples being Tyler Street (paddle steamer The Lady Tyler), Hamilton Street (paddle steamer Claud Hamilton), Adelaide Street (paddle steamer Adelaide) and Princess Street (paddle steamer Princess of Wales).

Claud Hamilton, a former chairman of GER, also gave his name to Hamilton Park, the extensive playing fields between the village and the station/quay area.

Parkeston is known locally as "Spike Island" or "Cinder City". The "Cinder City" name was particularly appropriate given the large areas of marshland or saltings that were reclaimed, frequently using waste material from the railway activities.

There are very few examples of villages established by a railway company to house its workers for an extensive railway and shipping service. This operation also included a locomotive shed and extensive marine workshops to service a fleet of vessels based at the port, which comprised up to a dozen ferries and cargo vessels at its peak.

From early in the 20th century, major passenger ferry services were developed, mainly to the Hook of Holland (with the slogan "Harwich to the Hook of Holland") and later to Esbjerg in Denmark. During both World Wars Parkeston served as an important naval base. Parkeston Quay is now named Harwich International Port and the railway station is named Harwich International. Parkeston is also now faced, across the Stour estuary, by the UK's busiest container port, the Port of Felixstowe.

=== Harwich Gateway Retail Park ===
Other than the port, the area of Parkeston that has seen the largest expansion in recent years is Harwich Gateway Retail Park, a retail district located in what is otherwise known as Iconfield Park, an area of land next to the port on the outskirts of Parkeston. The first shop to be built in the location was Safeway, a supermarket that opened in March 1997, and is currently a Morrisons store. This stood alone for many years, until a flurry of activity in the mid-2000s saw the proper formation of the retail park: a multi-unit development opposite the supermarket, the discount supermarket Lidl off the roundabout between the two, a Premier Inn and Brewers Fayre (opened October 2004 alongside Lidl, and most recently a Home Bargains store, opened in November 2014 on the opposite side of the retail park. There has also been a small housing estate called "The Gateway" built next to Lidl to accommodate the growth of the area.

== Timeline ==
- 1883: Parkeston Quay was officially opened by Charles H. Parkes, Chairman of the Great Eastern Railway Company.
- 1914–1918: The 8th and 9th submarine flotillas of the Royal Navy were based at Parkeston Quay, including all of the E-class submarines. Between 1916 and 1917, four submarines sank as a result of collisions outside the harbour: E4, E41, C16 and E36. Although the first three craft were salvaged, only 15 crew survived.
- 1917: Section II of the wartime Board of Invention and Research established a research station at the Quay under Sir William Bragg and Sir Ernest Rutherford to investigate the use of ASDIC and electro-magnetism to detect submarines.
- 1918: 113 submarines of the German fleet surrendered to the Royal Navy Submarine Service at Parkeston Quay on 20 November, a day before the High Seas Fleet surrendered at Scapa Flow.
- 1938: In the early hours of the morning of 2 December, the ferry from the Hook of Holland docked in Parkeston Quay. Among the passengers were 200 mostly Jewish children from Germany, none had parents with them. This was the first landing of the ‘Kindertransport’ – a unique rescue mission to try to save children from Nazi persecution.
- 1939: Parkeston Quay was again requisitioned by the Admiralty for naval purposes, during which time it was known as HMS Badger, until 1945.
- 1946: The quay suffered extensive damage in air raids during the Second World War.
- 1953: One of the Harwich-based ferries, the Duke of York, had her bows completely cut off in a collision with an American cargo ship, and the Danish passenger liner Kronprins Frederik caught fire while docked and capsized alongside the quay. Both casualties sat together in adjacent berths awaiting repair.

The village also suffered very severe flooding in the East Coast Floods of that springtime. The railway embankment which also acted as the sea wall was breached south of the loco shed immediately east of the village.

- 1964: The Carless oil refinery opened next to the port, adding oil tankers to the traffic.
- 1974: The 130-metre (430 ft) ro-ro ship St Edmund came into service and remained on the Hook route until being requisitioned by the UK Ministry of Defence in 1982 as a troop ship during the Falklands War.
- 1983: The St Nicholas, the largest superferry on the North Sea at that time, commenced service from Harwich.
- 1986: More than 2 million passengers annually passed through the port for the first time.
- 1989: Last call of the MS Braemar and end of the summer service to Kristiansand, Norway, which had been operated by Fred. Olsen Cruise Lines since 1967.
- 1992: Construction of No.2 linkspan was completed, in readiness for vessels of 200 metres (660 ft) loa.
- 1994: The annual number of trade vehicles moving through the port peaked at nearly 270,000.
- 1997: A£12 million development was completed to accommodate the Stena Discovery high-speed ferry.
- 1998: Harwich International Port became part of Hutchison Ports (UK) Ltd, a subsidiary of the multinational conglomerate Hutchison Whampoa Ltd (HWL), which also owns through subsidiaries the Port of Felixstowe.

== Gallery ==
Parkeston Station (now Harwich International) in Victorian times

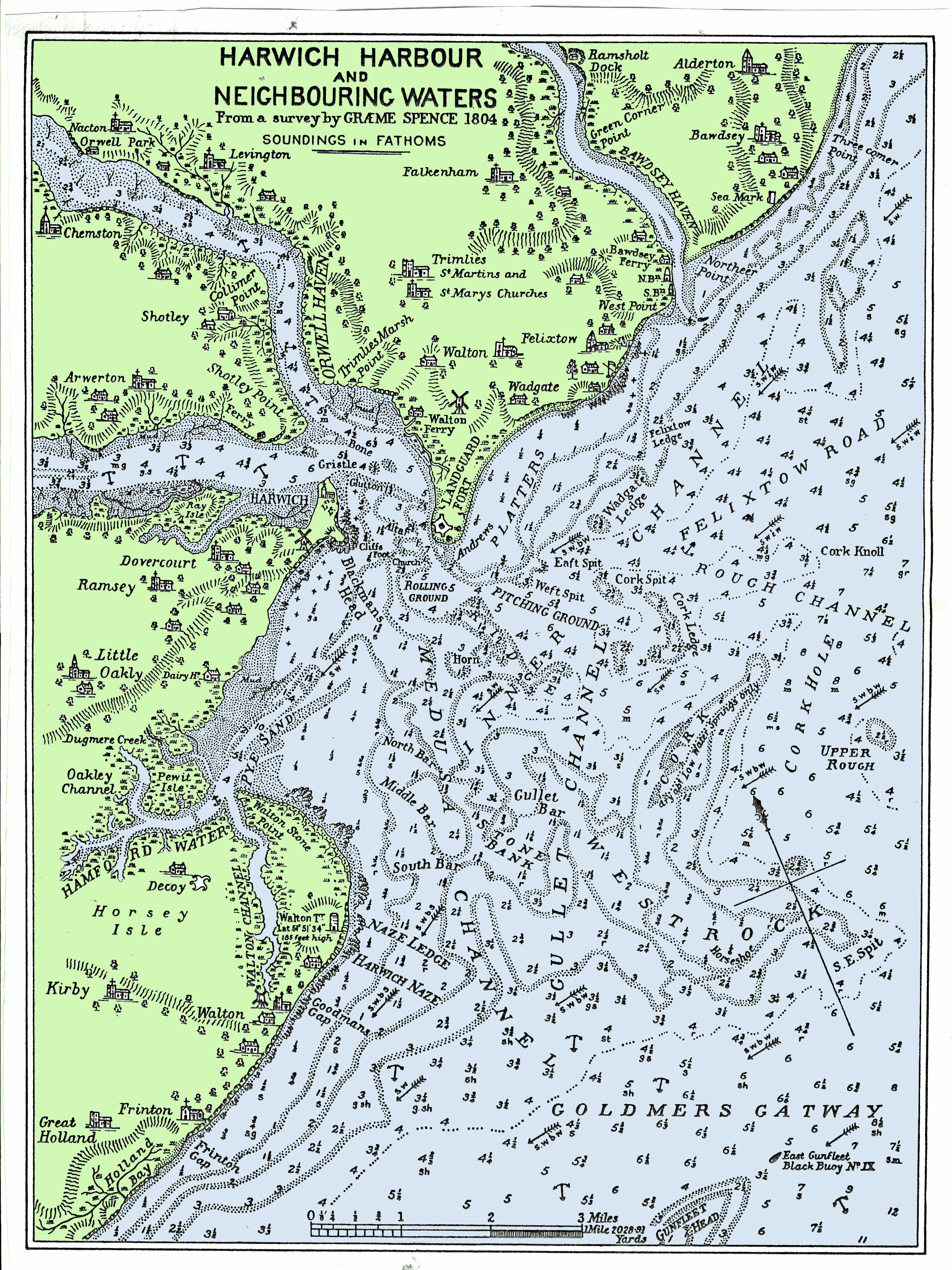
An 1804 chart of Harwich area from a survey by Graeme Spence - enlargement shows "Ray Isle".
