= Francillon (surname) =

Francillon is a surname, and may refer to:

- Ernest Francillon (1834–1900), founder and manager of Longines watch manufacturing company
- Henri Françillon (born 1946), Haitian footballer
- James Francillon (1802–1866), English barrister and legal writer
- John Francillon (1744–1816), English jeweller and naturalist
- Robert Edward Francillon (1841–1919), English journalist and author

== See also ==
- Francillon, Indre, France
- Francillon-sur-Roubion, Drôme, France
- Francillon was also the title of Alexandre Dumas, fils's last play.
