= SS Brussels =

Passenger ferry built in 1902

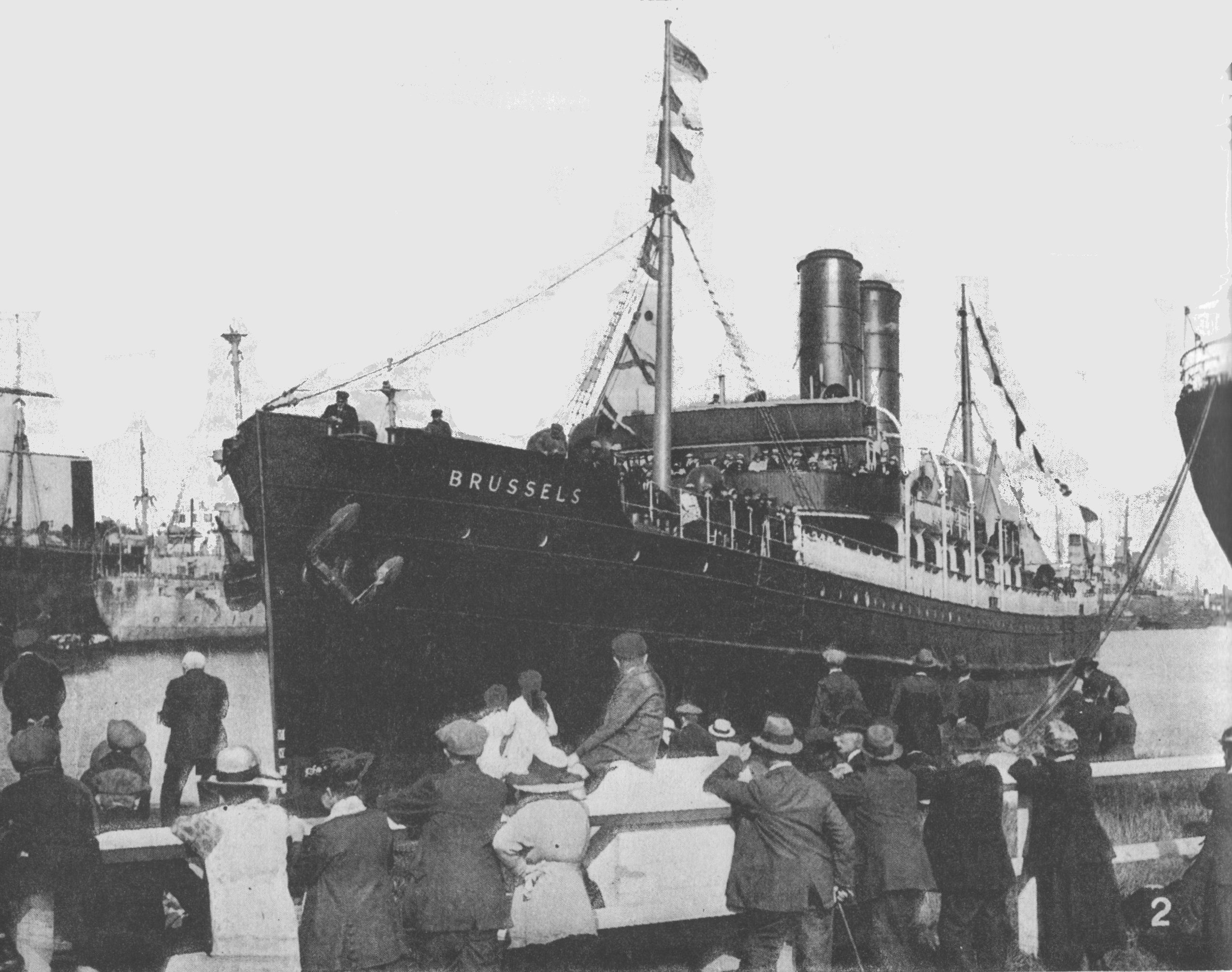

History
- Name: SS Brussels (1902–16); SMS Brugge (1916–21); SS Lady Brussels (1921–29)
- Owner: Great Eastern Railway (1902–16); Kaiserliche Marine (1916–18); Belgian Government (1918–20); Admiralty (1920–21); J Gale & Co (1921–29)
- Operator: Great Eastern Railway (1902–16); Kaiserliche Marine (1916–18); Dublin & Lancashire Steamship Co (1921–22); British & Irish Steam Packet Co Ltd (1922–29)
- Port of registry: (United Kingdom of Great Britain and Ireland) Harwich (1902–16); (German Empire) Berlin (1916–18); (United Kingdom of Great Britain and Ireland) Dublin (1921–23); (Republic of Ireland) Dublin (1923–29)
- Route: Harwich–Antwerp (1902–16); Preston–Dublin (1920–29)
- Builder: Gourlay Brothers, Dundee
- Yard number: 202
- Launched: 26 March 1902
- Completed: May 1902
- In service: May 1902
- Out of service: 1918–20
- Identification: UK Official Number 109884 (1902–16, 1921–29)
- Fate: Scrapped 1929

General characteristics
- Tonnage: 1,380 GRT
- Length: 285 ft (86.87 m)
- Beam: 34 ft (10.36 m)
- Depth: 15 ft 6 in (4.72 m)
- Installed power: Two triple-expansion steam engines
- Propulsion: Twin screws
- Speed: 16.5 knots (30.6 km/h)

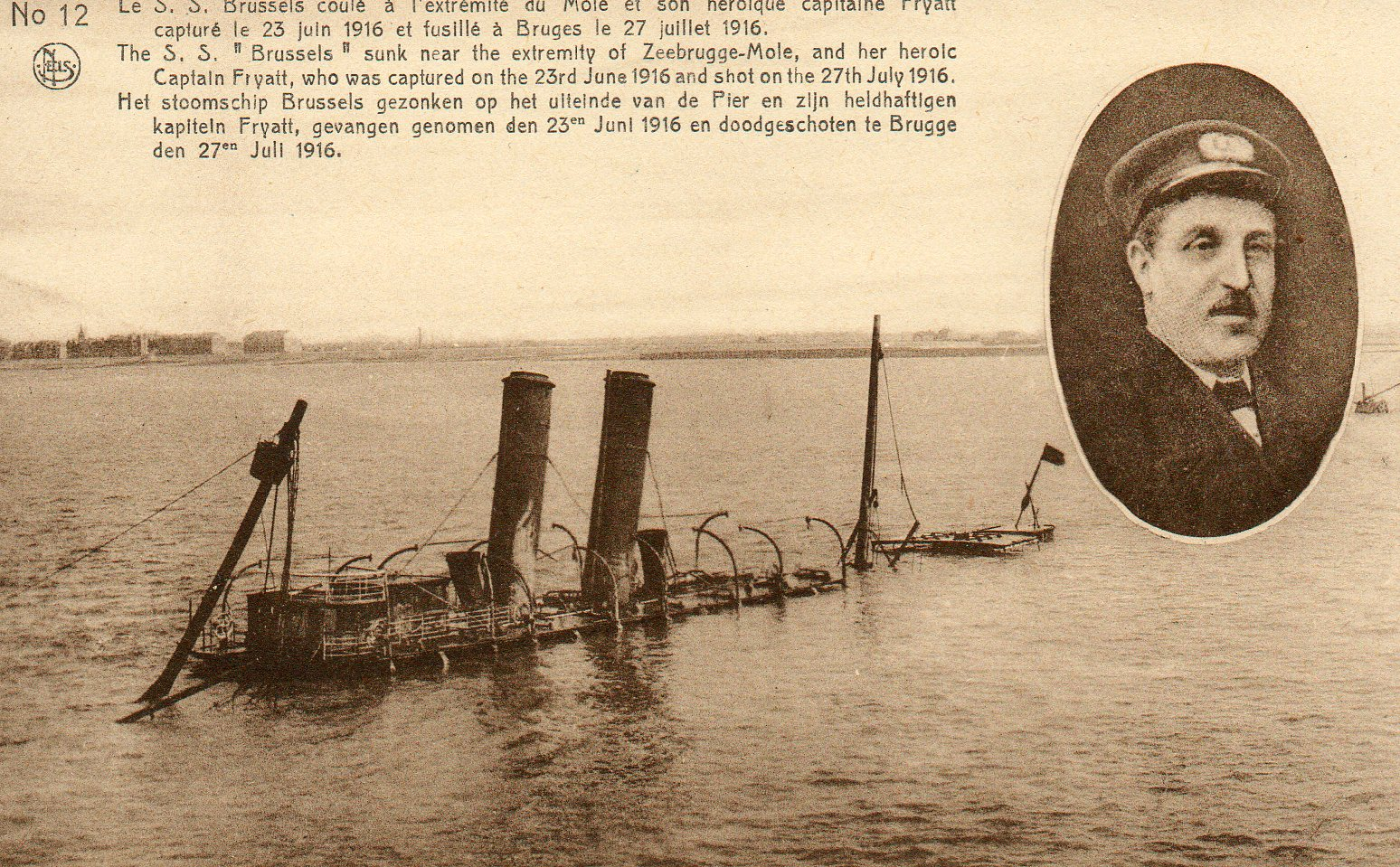
SMS Brugge scuttled at Zeebrugge, in late 1918

Brussels was a passenger ferry built in 1902 for the British Great Eastern Railway. In 1915, she tried to ram U-33. The ship was captured by Germany in 1916 and her captain, Charles Fryatt was executed after the Germans discovered his attempted ramming. Brussels was renamed Brugge and used as a depôt ship at Zeebrugge.

In October 1918, Brugge was scuttled by the Germans when they evacuated the port. The ship was raised by the Belgian government and presented to the Admiralty in 1920. She was repaired and later renamed Lady Brussels. She was employed as an Irish Sea ferry, serving until scrapped in 1929.

== Construction and design ==
Brussels was a 1,380 GRT passenger ferry. She was built by Gourlay Brothers, Dundee, as yard number 202. She was 285 feet (86.87 m) long, with a beam of 34 feet (10.36 m) and a depth of 15 feet 6 inches (4.72 m). Her two triple expansion steam engines gave a service speed of 16.5 knots (30.6 km/h).

Brussels was launched on 26 March 1902 and completed in May. Her Official Number was 109884 and her port of registry was Harwich.

== Service history ==
Brussels was used on the Harwich – Hook of Holland route. During the First World War, her captain, Fryatt, was twice recognised for his actions. On 3 March 1915, he evaded a German U-boat for which he was awarded a gold watch by the Great Eastern Railway. On 28 March 1915, Brussels was ordered to stop by U-33 when she was near the Maas Lightship, but Fryatt attempted to ram the U-boat, which was forced to crash dive. For this action, the Admiralty awarded him a gold watch. The First Officer and Chief Engineer also received gold watches from the Admiralty for this action.

On 23 June 1916, Brussels was captured by the German torpedo boats G101 and G102. Fryatt was interned at Zeebrugge where he was arrested after engravings on his watches revealed his previous actions. Fryatt was tried and executed on 27 July 1916. Brussels was taken over by the Kaiserliche Marine and renamed Brugge, serving as a depôt ship at Zeebrugge. Her port of registry was nominally Berlin. On 23 April 1918, the Zeebrugge Raid took place, and the ship was torpedoed several times by the British, but did not sink. Brugge was scuttled by the Germans on 28 October 1918 when they evacuated Zeebrugge.

In 1918, Brugge was claimed by the Belgian government as a war prize. On 26 April 1920, she was presented to Britain. On 17 May, Brugge left Antwerp assisted by three tugs on a three-day journey to South Shields. Brugge was taken to a Henry Robb's shipyard at Leith to be repaired. She was sold by auction in 1920 for £2,700 to J Gale & Co. She was operated by the Dublin & Lancashire Steamship Company, which was later taken over by the British & Irish Steam Packet Company. Her port of registry was Dublin. Brugge was renamed Lady Brussels in 1922. She was used on the Preston – Dublin route, serving until 1929. In May 1929 she was scrapped by Smith & Co, Port Glasgow. In 1920, the 10,317 feet (3,145 m) high Brussels Peak in Canada (51°31′00″N 117°49′20″W) was named in honour of the ship.

A ship's bell, which had been installed in the ship during her repairs in 1920/21, was acquired by Harwich Borough Council at put on display in Harwich Guildhall in April 1950.
