= Ramsey, Essex =

Village in Essex, England

Coordinates: 51.928°N 1.217°E

Ramsey
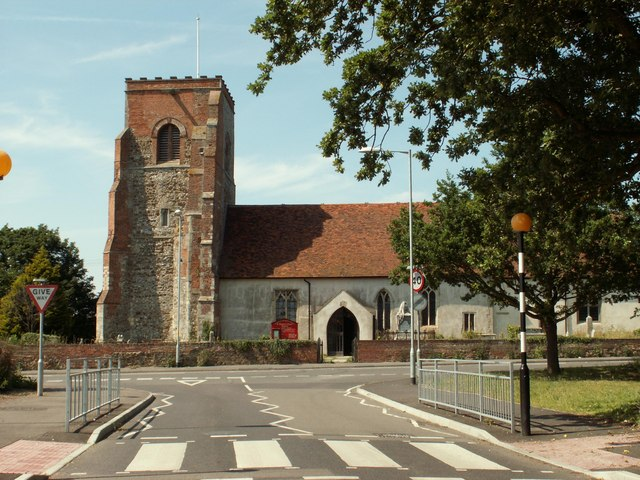

- Location within Essex
- Population: 2,343 (2011)
- Civil parish: Ramsey and Parkeston
- District: Tendring
- Shire county: Essex
- Region: East
- Country: England
- Sovereign state: United Kingdom
- Post town: HARWICH
- Postcode district: CO12
- Dialling code: 01255
- Police: Essex
- Fire: Essex
- Ambulance: East of England
- UK Parliament: Harwich

Ramsey is a village on the B1352 road, in the civil parish of Ramsey and Parkeston, in the Tendring district, in the county of Essex, England. It is near the A120 road and the town of Harwich. It has a pub called the Castle Inn.

The Domesday Book of 1086 records two parcels of land in the area, "Michaelstou" and "Rameseia". These were later divided into seven manors:

1. The manor of Roydon Hall
2. The manor of Ramsey Hall
3. The manor of Michaelstowe
4. The manor of East New Hall
5. The manor of Strondland
6. The manor of Le Rey (Ray Island)
7. The manor of Foulton

== See also ==
- Ramsey Windmill, Essex
- Michaelstowe Hall
