= Harwich Mayflower Heritage Centre =

Museum in Essex, England

- Location of the Centre within Essex
- Established: 2017
- Location: Harwich; Essex, CO12; United Kingdom
- Coordinates: 51.944°N 1.287°E
- Type: Heritage
- Chairman: Tony Elliston
- Public transit access: Mayflower line
- Website: harwichmayflower.com

Mayflower Replica
History

United Kingdom
- Namesake: Mayflower
- Owner: Harwich Mayflower Heritage Centre
- Keel Cut: June 2013
- Projected Completion Date: Not specified
- Quatercentenary Voyage: 2020

The Harwich Mayflower Heritage Centre (formerly Project) is a museum and charitable community project whose main goal is to establish a "legacy for Essex", both through constructing a full-scale replica of the famous Mayflower ship which transported a hundred Pilgrim Fathers from England to America in 1620, and through celebrating the history and heritage of Harwich, a town in the south-east of England.

== History ==
The Centre's formation, initially as the "Harwich Mayflower Project", was inspired by a visit to the town from a replica of HMS Endeavour, the ship commanded by James Cook. A small group of residents came together in 2009 to form a project for Harwich to build its own replica ship. The Mayflower was the obvious choice due to its Harwich connections, as ship's master Christopher Jones was born and raised there. The first designs of the ship were unveiled in April 2009. By 2010, the project had achieved charitable status, and it commenced before the year was through. It received a major boost in 2010 with an official endorsement by Richard Branson, the billionaire founder of Virgin Group.

In 2016, a visitor centre and museum were built in the yard next to the ship. In July 2017, a newsletter stated that "funds must be in place by March 2018 or the 2020 date will be missed" for building a seafaring replica; a shore-based replica was touted as an alternative. In that event, the charity will be renamed the Harwich Mayflower Heritage Centre.

As of April 2018, the former Project has been incorporated into the Heritage Centre; a shore-based replica is to be built "that will become the centerpiece of the former Harwich Station Yard and the focus of the 2020 Mayflower 400 commemoration in Harwich." Meanwhile, a Railway & Shipping Museum has opened at the site of the Harwich Town railway station, which "has been designed to show the GER station at Harwich town as it would have looked internally about 1924 which coincides with the opening on April 24th 1924 by Prince George Duke of Kent of the Harwich train ferry terminal."

== Harwich Mayflower build ==
The main construction of the seafaring Mayflower was within a specially built shed situated within Harwich Town railway station's railyard, with the main progress visible outside in the yard. The build officially commenced in December 2012 with cutting the first oak tree. In June 2013, a ceremony was held for cutting the keel. In December 2014, the first stage of the build was completed.

Visible progress of the build has stalled since this first stage. The vice chairman of the Mayflower Project board of trustees has since resigned, but stated that she expected building to recommence in the Summer of 2016. A local newspaper reported in March 2017 that no build would start until funding was in place. The Heritage Centre confirmed in April 2018 that the build is to be shore-based rather than a seafaring replica.

== Railway and maritime museum ==
In 2017, extensive work began to renovate the disused buildings at Harwich Town rail station. The interiors were to be completely overhauled and, using local rail enthusiast Bob Clow's extensive and unique collection of memorabilia, converted to replicate their appearance as they would have looked in about 1924.

By June 2017, the renovation of the station was well under way. In October 2017, a 25-year lease was signed on the Harwich Town Station buildings, securing their future for the long term.

The Museum officially opened on 15 April 2018, to coincide with the charity railtour train ride arriving into the town.

== Training ==
The centre had a Training Centre which offered NVQs and apprenticeships; this was closed in May 2016.

== In the media ==
Word of the Centre gathered momentum in 2013, with multiple news agencies both sides of the Atlantic and beyond picking up on the story of Harwich's Mayflower claim, from Britain to America, Canada, and even Hungary.

The Centre itself has also received national coverage from the BBC and ITV, from a range of online publications writing about the 400 Year celebrations for the Mayflower expedition as well as a number of local papers, including the Harwich & Manningtree Standard and the East Anglian Daily Times.
