= Bath Side Battery =

Coordinates: 51.9446°N 1.2850°E

Bath Side Battery was built in 1811 to cover the anchorage of the port of Harwich, Essex, England, as part of the same complex as the Redoubt, armed with 3 × 24-pdr (11 kg) cannon. The battery was allowed to decay, and after 1990 excavations is marked out on the ground in front of the Anchor pub, Stour Road. This Public House has since been demolished. As of April 2019, the land is still unused, with future plans as yet unknown.
