= HMS Badger (shore establishment) =

Coordinates: 51°56′53″N 1°15′18″E

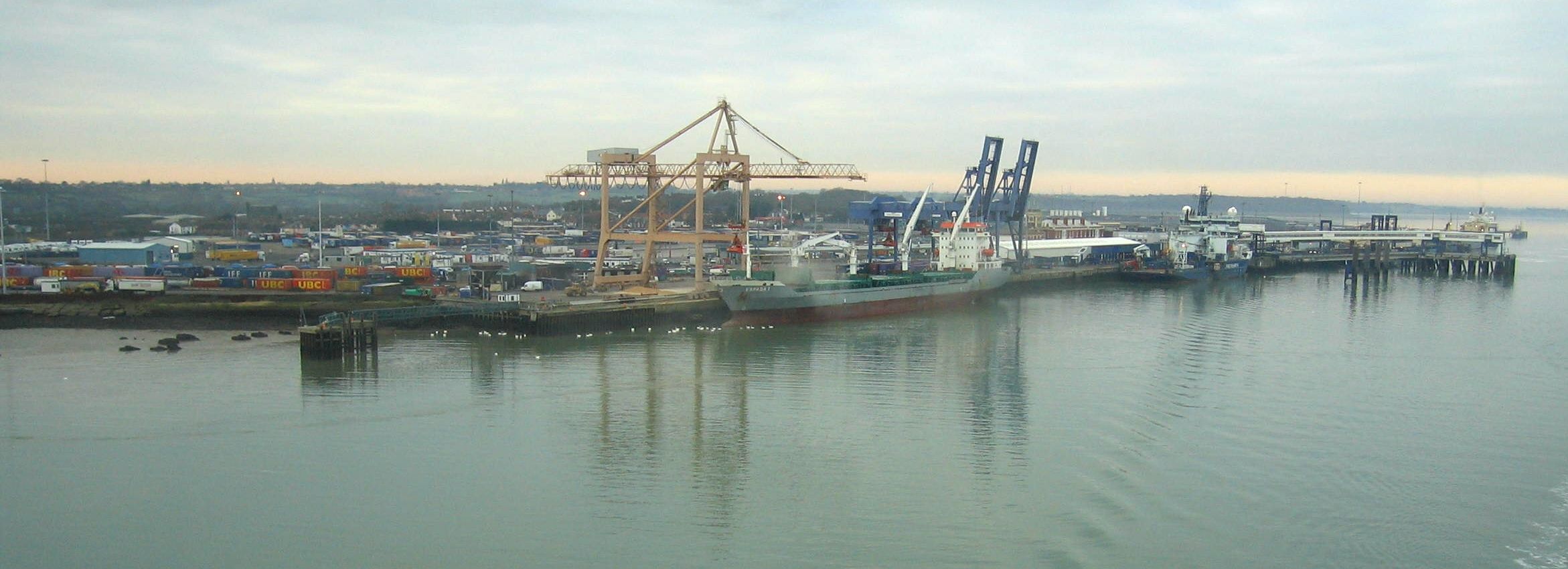
- Harwich International Port - site of HMS Badger as it is seen todayHarwich International Port, a present-day view of the site of HMS Badger

History

United Kingdom
- Name: HMS Badger
- Commissioned: 13 September 1939
- Decommissioned: 21 October 1946

General characteristics
- Class & type: Stone frigate

HMS Badger was a shore establishment of the Royal Navy on the east coast of the United Kingdom. She was commissioned on 13 September 1939, and was the flagship of the headquarters of the Flag Officer in Charge (FOIC), Harwich who was responsible to Commander-in-Chief, The Nore. She was decommissioned on 21 October 1946, although the Operations Room remained as the Emergency Port Control for the Harwich area. The site was Parkeston Quay, now Harwich International Port, and the bunker lies under Hamilton House, currently an occupational health centre, close to the entrance to Harwich International Port, a few miles west of Harwich.

== Second World War ==
The Parkeston Quay site had been used during the First World War by the Royal Navy (see Harwich Force), and an Admiralty Research Laboratory had been constructed there. The port was, again, requisitioned from the London & North Eastern Railway (LNER) at the beginning of World War II.

In its early days Badger provided a base for minesweepers, but by the end of 1940 it also serviced a destroyer flotilla, a submarine squadron and a Coastal Forces motor torpedo boat base, becoming the largest base for small craft in the United Kingdom.

Badger was the name of the Harwich-Parkeston shore base but, for traditionalist purposes, was also applied to a harbour craft—initially the requisitioned LNER ferry Epping, and later, the large 4-masted sailing ship Westwood, which was kept permanently moored, as personnel-accommodation ship, at the east end of Parkeston Quay.

HMS Badger had in excess of 1,300 shore staff, with up to 4,000 more men on warships under the authority of its FOIC (a rear-admiral or vice-admiral). His authority extending from the River Blackwater to Dunwich, and across to Holland. About 600 men of this command lost their lives, mainly at sea due to air and E-boat attacks (such as on the destroyers Wren and Exmoor) or mines (Gipsy and Grenville).

Its facilities included oil tanks, signals office (with WT/RT) station, a bomb disposal unit, a salvage and rescue tugs base, engineering sheds for warships (though there was no dockyard), minefield control posts (with small radar station), harbour entrance signal/control station, officers' club (at Michaelstowe Hall), and ratings club (at Parkeston).

Various sub-bases, originally part of it, were progressively split off under their own officers, such as HMS Epping for minesweepers, HMS Beehive (Felixstowe) for MTBs and HMS Bunting (Ipswich) for auxiliary patrol.

The successive FOICs were Harris, Goolden, Rogers, Baillie-Grohman and Watson. The base was visited by Winston Churchill, King George VI, Queen Wilhelmina of the Netherlands and Admiral Sir Jack Tovey.

Its minesweepers were prominent in early efforts to find and destroy German magnetic mines. In April 1940, its submarines were active off Denmark and Norway, and later patrolled off the Dutch coast. In May 1940, it played important roles in the Dutch and Dunkirk evacuations, and the refugees landed there included the Dutch royal family).

It was then designated as an anti-invasion base. By the end of 1940, its main warship unit was 16th Destroyer Flotilla, made up of V & W class and Hunt-class destroyers. In the autumn of 1940, it was one of half a dozen east coast naval bases unsuccessfully targeted by the Italian Air Force. In 1942, six destroyers went from there to intercept the Germans Scharnhorst, Gneisenau and Prinz Eugen. HMS Worcester came back with many dead-along with many other Harwich naval fatalities buried at RNTE Shotley.

In 1944, it was responsible for Force L and other follow-up forces for the D-Day invasion, though the initial contingents for these were loaded over at Felixstowe. In 1945, Brauning, the German admiral commanding in the Occupied Netherlands, and other German officers, were landed there having come into Felixstowe on two E-boats.

At various times ships and crews of many Allied nations were attached to the base, including Poles, French, Dutchmen and Belgians.

At the end of the war, it was designated as an anchorage for the Reserve Fleet. (References—J P Foynes: The Battle of the East Coast 1939-1945—published 1994—by far the most detailed and researched account of the base, based on official Admiralty records and veteran's interviews).

After a short period accommodated in the Station Hotel at Parkeston Quay, the accommodation and administration moved, in 1940, to Hamilton House, the former Georgian customs house. A bunker was built under Hamilton House, and this opened in 1941 as an underground operations room. Anti-aircraft sea-forts (known as HM Fort Roughs), located 10 miles offshore, were kept supplied from HMS Badger. An alternative deceptive site for Parkeston Quay was sited at East Mersea, but the port area suffered extensive damage from air attacks during the course of World War II

== Post-war service ==
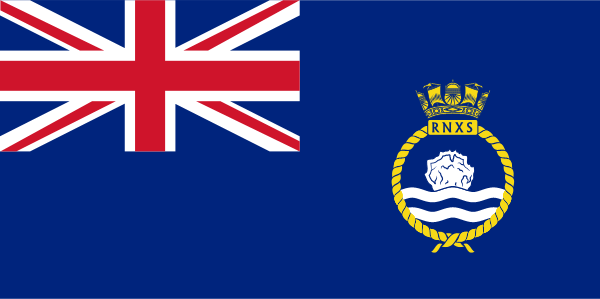
Ensign of the Royal Naval Auxiliary Service

HMS Badger was decommissioned on 21 October 1946, but the operations room was retained. When the Royal Naval Auxiliary Service (RNXS) was formed in 1964, the bunker was refurbished and re-opened as the emergency port control for Parkeston, Harwich, the Port of Felixstowe, the Port of Ipswich and the River Orwell. Several of these centres around the United Kingdom were intended to direct shipping in the event of a nuclear attack. The RNXS bunker remained operational until 1992.
