= Little Oakley Channel Deposit =

Protected site in Essex, England

Coordinates: 51.921°N 1.231°E

- Site of Special Scientific Interest
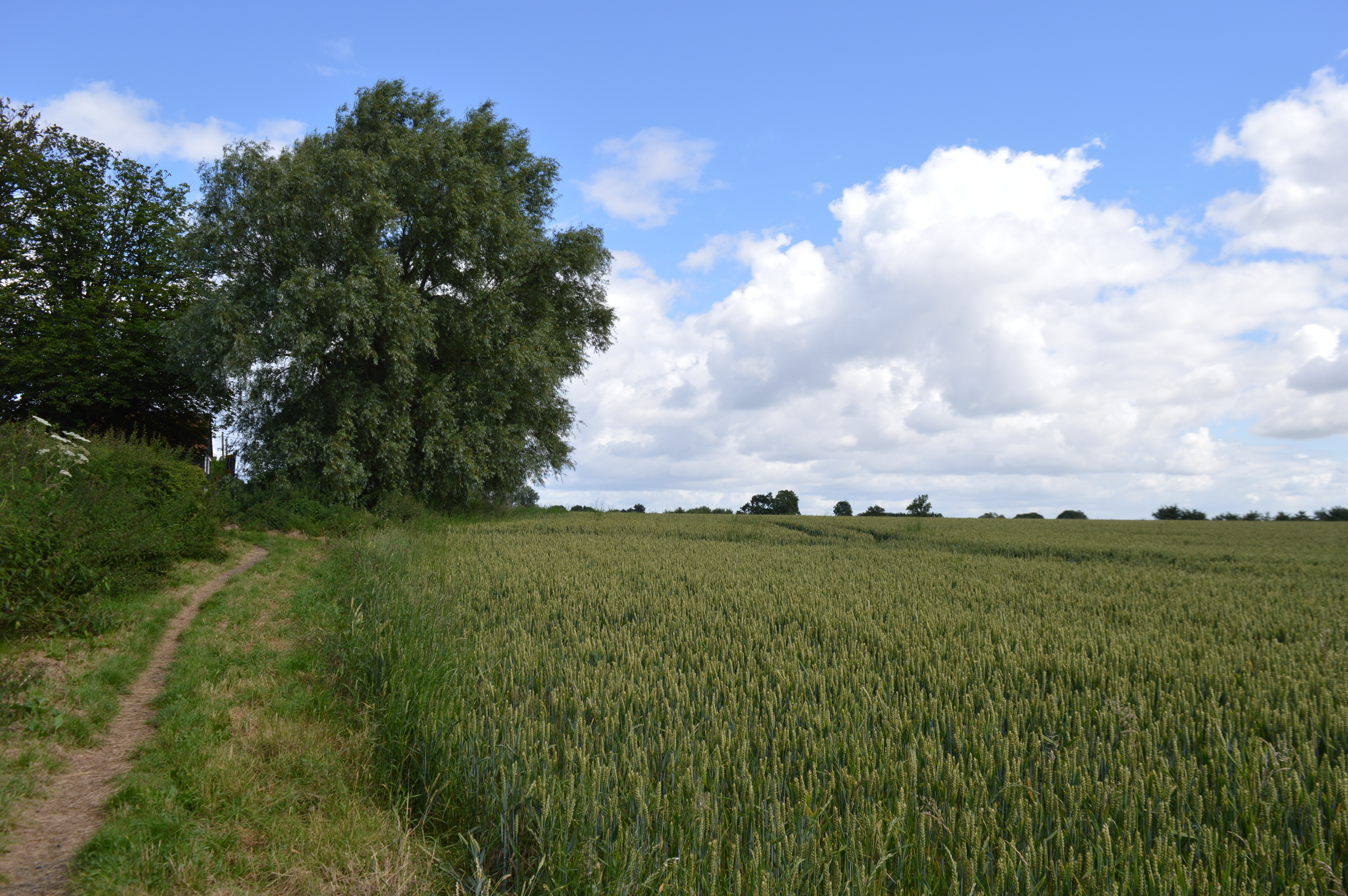
- No geology is visible as the site has been filled in.
- Location of Little Oakley Channel Deposit.
- Area of search: Essex
- Grid reference: TM 223296
- Interest: Geological
- Area: 3.0 ha (7.4 acres)
- Notification date: 1990
- Location map: Magic Map

Little Oakley Channel Deposit is a three-hectare geological Site of Special Scientific Interest in Little Oakley in Essex, England. It is a Geological Conservation Review site.

This site exposed a former channel of the River Thames during an interglacial period around 575,000 years ago, probably where it met the early River Medway. The site was found in 1939, but not excavated until the 1980s. Many fossils were found, including rhinoceros and giant deer, many freshwater shells and an extensive pollen record, allowing geologists to reconstruct the fauna and flora of the time.

As the site has been filled in, no geology is visible.
