= Beacon Hill Battery =

Late-19th and 20th century coastal fortification

- Harwich; Essex; England
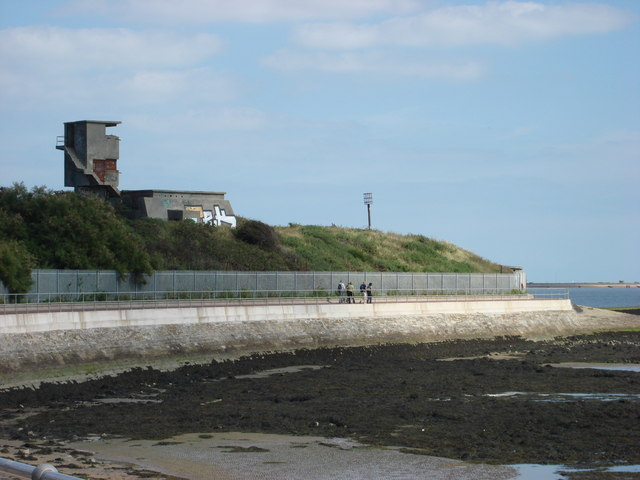
- Beacon Hill Battery, showing the 1941 director tower for twin 6-pounder guns.

Site information
- Type: Coastal fortification
- Owner: private
- Condition: At risk

Location
- Location within Essex
- Coordinates: 51.9381°N 1.2892°E

Site history
- Built: 1889-92
- Materials: Earth; Concrete

Beacon Hill Battery (also known as Beacon Hill Fort) is a late-19th and 20th century coastal fortification that was built to defend the port of Harwich, Essex. It is a scheduled ancient monument.

== Prior military use of the site ==
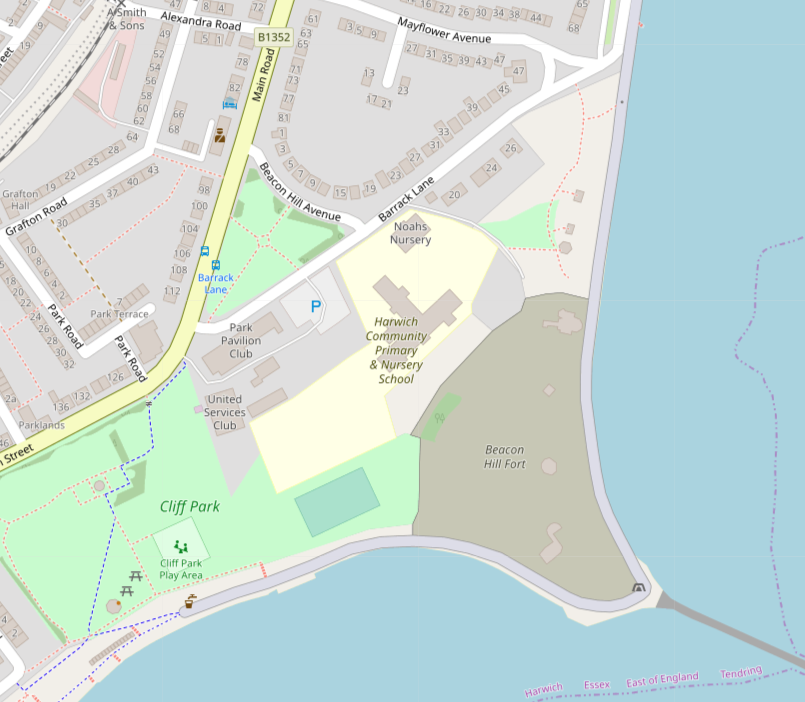
Map of Beacon Hill Fort, Harwich, OpenStreetMap 2019

Beacon Hill is a promontory on the Harwich peninsula, about one kilometre south of the town. It overlooks the estuaries of the Stour and Orwell rivers on the approach to the harbour, which has been an important civil and naval port since the Middle Ages.

=== Tudor blockhouse: House-upon-the-Hill ===
The first fortification built on the site was one of three blockhouses, constructed at Harwich during the reign of Henry VIII, following his visit to the town in 1543. These were Device Forts, built at Tower House, Middle House and the House-upon-the-Hill. They were abandoned within ten years, only to be briefly revived in 1588, owing to the threat posed by the Spanish Armada. By 1625 the site had again fallen into disrepair and Harwich was considered to be defenceless. The site of the actual blockhouse was destroyed by erosion.

=== Napoleonic Wars ===
A nearby site was chosen for Harwich Barracks. These were built in 1803. The original occupants were the West Essex Regiment and the Royal Buckinghamshire Militia. On the promontory itself, an earthen artillery battery of five 24-pounder guns was constructed in 1812, intended to supplement the larger Harwich Redoubt, which had been completed 200 yards (180 m) to the north in 1810 and was armed with ten 24-pounders. By 1822, the battery had been lost to erosion, and a replacement planned in 1839 was not built.

== Beacon Hill Battery ==
In 1887, renewed fear of a French invasion prompted the Secretary of State for War, Edward Stanhope, to chair a committee on the "Fortifications and Armaments of Military and Mercantile Ports". One of the results of the committee's report was the ordering of a new artillery battery at Beacon Hill in September 1888; work had been completed by May 1892. The battery was built to an innovative design; an artificial mound in the centre of the promontory served to conceal the underground magazines, shelters and ancillary buildings, while creating a natural-looking profile against which, the lighter weapons at the foot of the mound would be difficult to see. The rear of the work was protected by a defensive perimeter built to a new design called the Twydall Profile, consisting of an earthen rampart, fronted by a glacis sloping down to a shallow ditch that concealed a steel palisade fence.

The battery was powerfully armed with a single BL 10-inch gun and a single BL 6-inch gun on a hydro-pneumatic disappearing mountings, together with two QF 4.7-inch guns. In 1894, a former practice battery sited near the tip of the headland and dating from 1871 was rebuilt to mount four RML 64-pounder guns on traversing carriages for close defence. Two QF 3-pounder Hotchkiss guns were added in 1898.

By the turn of the 20th century, concern had shifted from France to Germany, and the battery's armament was the subject of several upgrades. In 1898, a depression range finder and telephone system were installed. In 1901, a further BL 6-inch gun was added to the north of the battery. In 1903, the original guns were replaced with three of the latest BL 6-inch Mk VII guns, but retaining the two old 4.7-inch guns. During the First World War, Harwich was an important destroyer base; improvements to the battery included two QF 1-pounder pom-pom anti-aircraft guns.

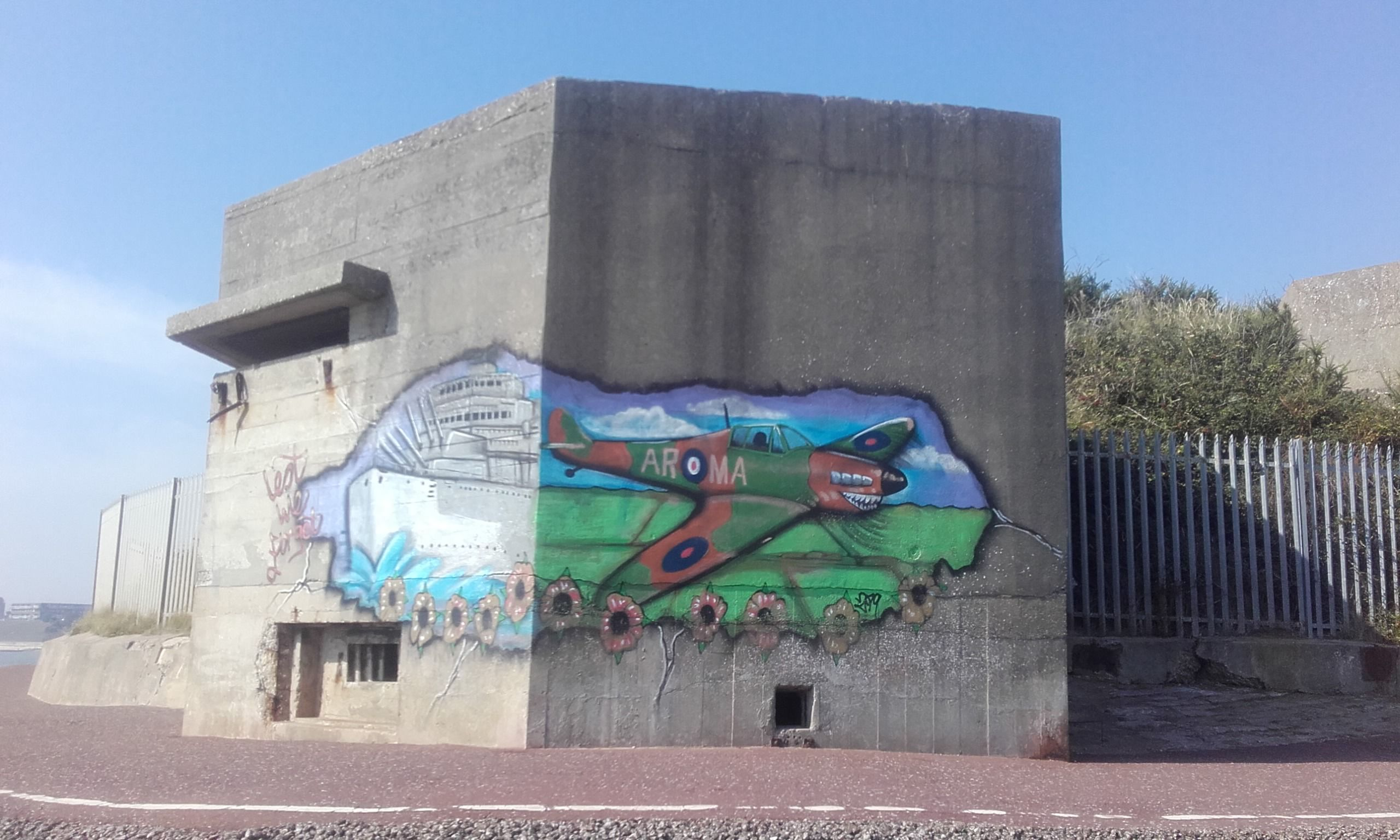
The Extended Defence Officer (EXDO) post, with modern mural.

The fort remained operational in the inter-war period, although the 4.7-inch guns were finally retired. Plans to modernise the battery had not been started before the outbreak of the Second World War. In 1940, a new emplacement, known as "Cornwallis Battery" was constructed for two rapid-firing QF 6-pounder 10 cwt guns on a twin-barrelled mounting, intended to counter fast attack craft, which also included a new magazine, shelters and a prominent three-storey battery observation post (BOP). The 6-inch guns were partially enclosed by concrete casemates to protect the crews from air attack. In April 1941, a hexagonal tower was built 100 yards north of Beacon Hill. This housed a Type 287 Radio Direction Finding (RDF) array, used to monitor the observation mine field installed across the harbour entrance. It remained in use until December 1943. The tower still retains its original array with replacement 'pig trough' reflectors. Ground defences were improved by the addition of pillboxes, trenches and searchlight emplacements. Overlooking the breakwater, a concrete blockhouse housed an Extended Defence Officer (EXDO) post, from where naval officers could electrically detonate sea mines in the estuary.

== Decommissioning and subsequent restoration ==
The fort was finally decommissioned in 1956 on the dissolution of coast artillery in the United Kingdom.

In early 2018, part of Beacon Hill Battery was bought by Paul Valentine and Barry Sharp as part of a restoration project.
