= Harwich Guildhall =

Municipal building in Harwich, Essex, England

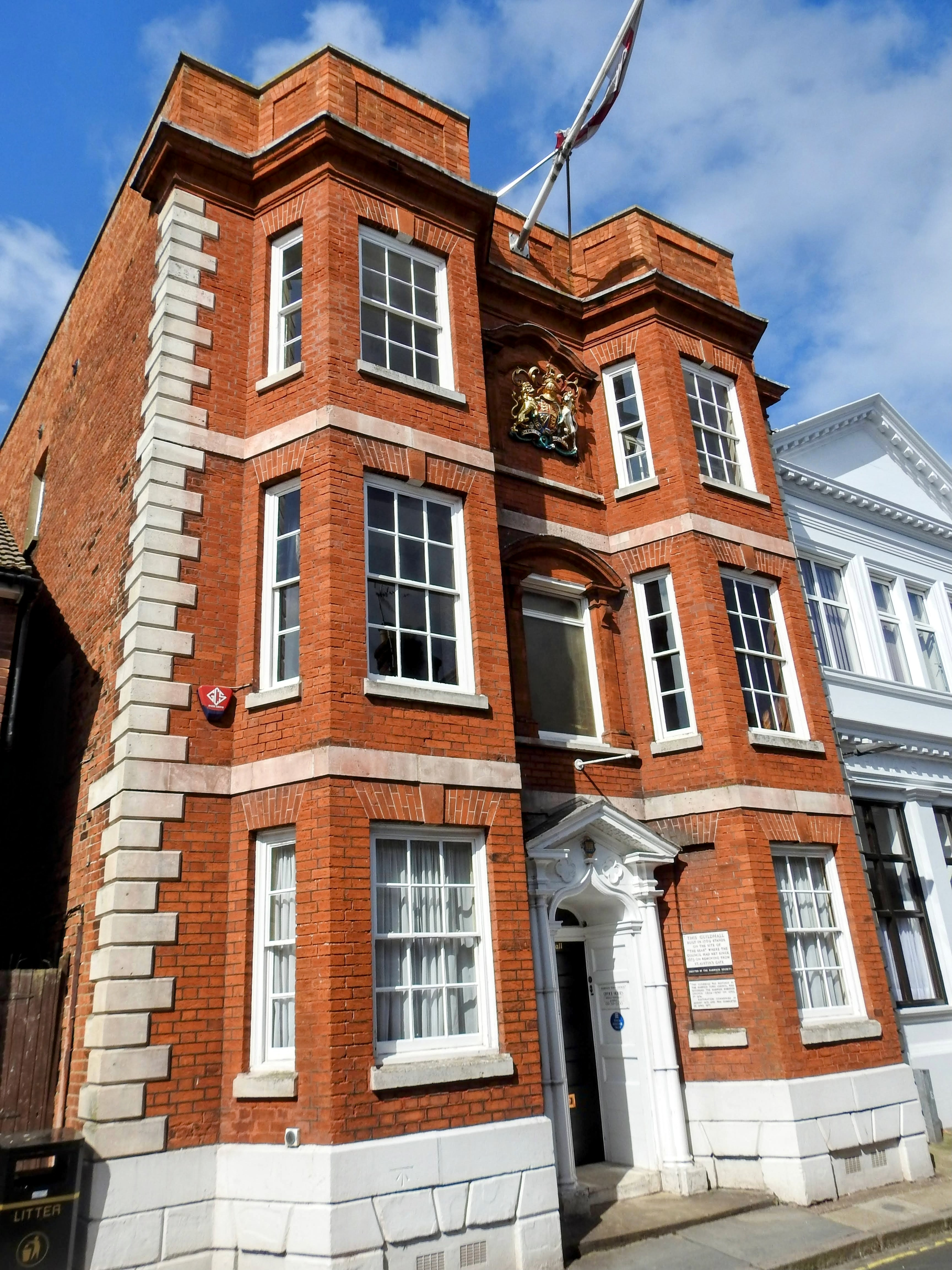
- Harwich Guildhall

- Shown in Essex
- 51.9459°N 1.2879°E
- Location: Church Street, Harwich

History
- Built: 1769

Site notes
- Architectural style: Georgian style

Listed Building – Grade I
- Official name: Guildhall
- Designated: 25 September 1951
- Reference no.: 1298482

Harwich Guildhall is a municipal building in Church Street, Harwich, Essex, England. The structure, which accommodates the offices of Harwich Town Council, is a Grade I listed building.

== History ==
The first building on the site was a public house known as "The Bear", which dated back to at least the mid-17th century. It was acquired by Harwich Borough Council, when the council relocated from an earlier guildhall in St Austin's Gate, in 1673. The current building was designed in the Georgian style, built in red brick with stone dressings and was completed in 1769.

The design involved a symmetrical main frontage of three bays facing onto Church Street. The central bay contained an doorway with an ogee-shaped fanlight, flanked by elaborate pilasters, described by English Heritage as being in the style of Batty Langley, which supported an open pediment. There was an aedicula containing a stained glass window on the first floor and a Royal coat of arms surmounted by a curved pediment on the second floor. The outer bays, which were canted, were fenestrated by sash windows with keystones on all three floors. At roof level, there was a parapet which was embellished with a series of recessed panels. Internally, the principal room was the council chamber, which was panelled, on the first floor. There was also a mayor's parlour, which contained the civic regalia and the official brass yard, on the first floor, and a "carvings room", which contained elaborate carvings which had been created by petty criminals when they were incarcerated in the room, on the ground floor.

The building continued to serve as the meeting place of Harwich Borough Council throughout the 19th century and the first half of the 20th century, but ceased to be local seat of government when the borough council moved to the former Great Eastern Railway Hotel at Harwich Quay in October 1951. However, following local government re-organisation in 1974, the guildhall became the meeting place of Harwich Town Council. An extensive programme of refurbishment works was carried out at the guildhall between August 1975 and April 1977.

In February 2000, the Archbishop of Canterbury, George Carey, visited the guildhall, and, in November 2004, Queen Elizabeth II visited the building to mark the 400th anniversary of the granting of a royal charter to the town.

Works of art in the town hall include a portrait by William Owen of the former Chancellor of the Exchequer, Nicholas Vansittart, 1st Baron Bexley, a portrait by Frederick George Cotman of Alderman William Groom and a portrait by an unnamed artist of King Charles II. Other artefacts in the building include the ship's bell from the passenger ferry, SS Brussels, which was registered at Harwich but was captured by the Imperial German Navy in June 1916 during the First World War.

== See also ==
- Grade I listed buildings in Essex
