= James Francillon =

English barrister and legal writer

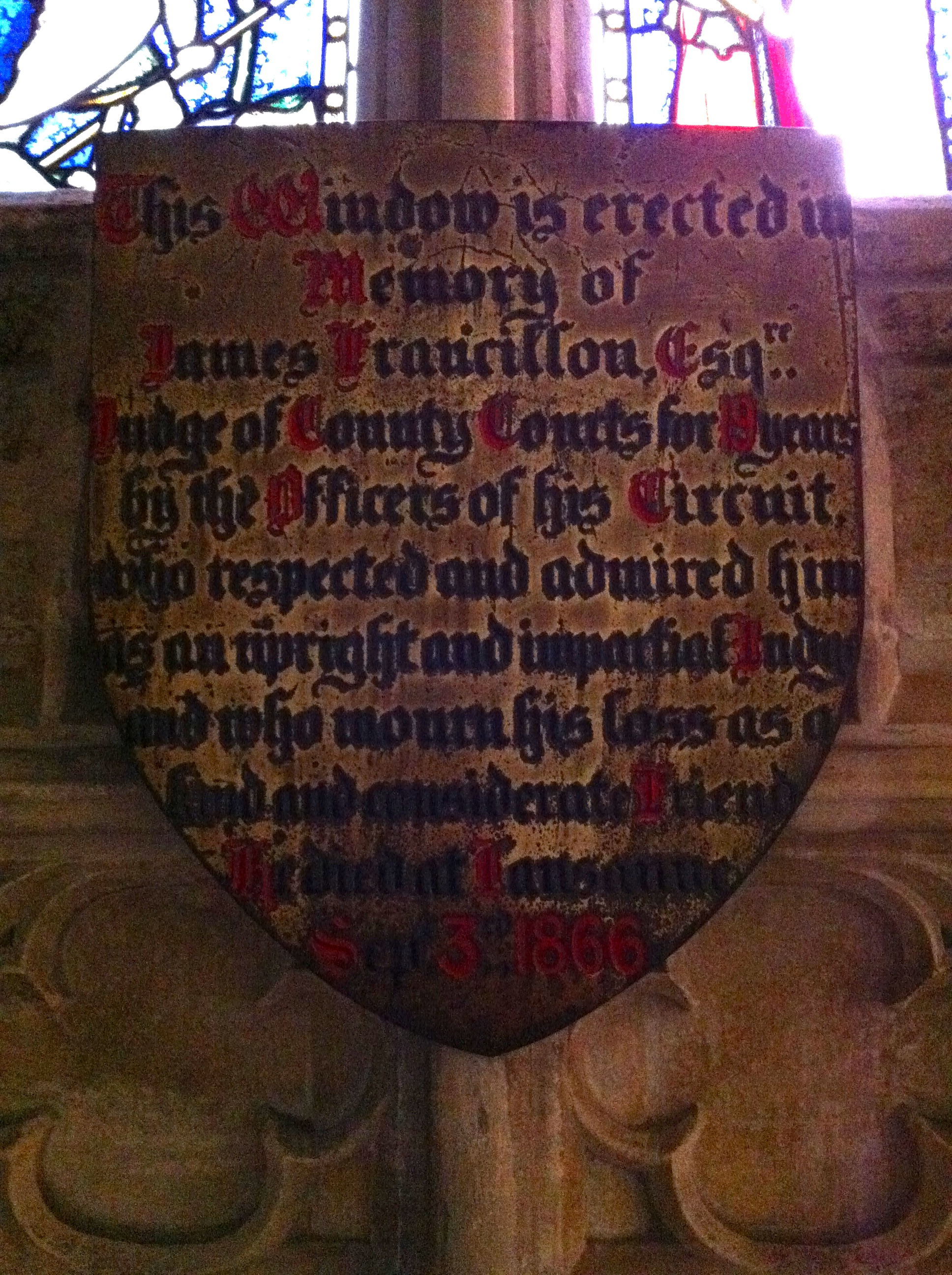
- Memorial in Gloucester Cathedral
- Born: 21 November 1802
- Died: 3 September 1866 (aged 63); Lausanne, Switzerland
- Education: King's School, Rochester
- Occupations: Barrister, county court judge, legal writer

James Francillon (21 November 1802 – 3 September 1866) was an English barrister and legal writer.

== Life ==
Francillon was the sixth son of Francis Francillon of Harwich, Essex, born 21 November 1802. He was educated at the King's School, Rochester, served his articles and was admitted an attorney. He then entered Gray's Inn, and was called to the bar there in 1833.

He went the Oxford circuit, enjoyed a fair practice, but was chiefly employed in chamber work. In 1847, when the new county courts were constituted, he was appointed judge for the Gloucestershire district. He was also a magistrate for Gloucestershire and Wiltshire, and deputy-chairman of the Gloucestershire quarter sessions.

Francillon, who was married and had issue, died in Lausanne of cholera 3 September 1866.

== Works ==
He wrote Lectures, Elementary and Familiar, on English Law, first and second series, 1860–61.
