= Little Oakley, Essex =

Village and civil parish in Essex, UK

Coordinates: 51.916°N 1.223°E

Little Oakley
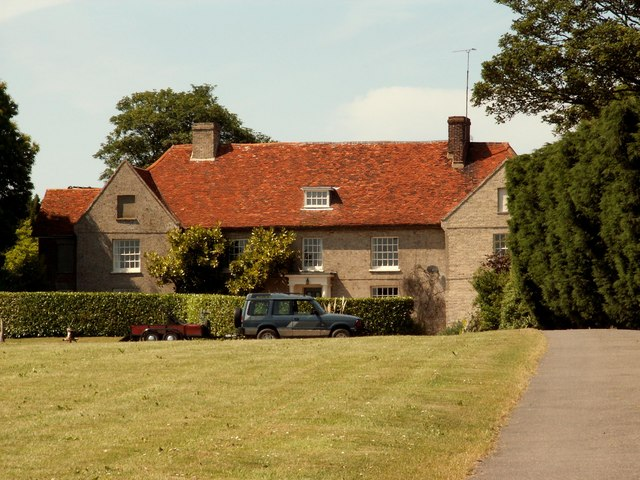
- Little Oakley Hall

- Location within Essex
- Population: 1,195 (Parish, 2021)
- Civil parish: Little Oakley
- District: Tendring
- Shire county: Essex
- Region: East
- Country: England
- Sovereign state: United Kingdom
- Post town: Harwich
- Postcode district: CO12
- UK Parliament: Harwich and North Essex

Little Oakley is a village and civil parish in the Tendring district of Essex, England, on the western outskirts of Harwich. At the 2021 census the parish had a population of 1,195.

It is the site of a fourth-century Roman villa, excavated between 1951 and 1975.

Just north-east of the village is Little Oakley Channel Deposit, a geological Site of Special Scientific Interest. It is the site of former channel of the River Thames during an interglacial period about 575,000 years ago.
