= Haltermann Carless =

Haltermann Carless is the present-day continuation of one of the earliest oil companies. With more than 165 years of corporate history, Haltermann Carless is one of the most traditional companies in the chemical industry and is regarded as a pioneer in the development of high-quality specialty hydrocarbon products. Haltermann Carless (operating under the company name HCS Group until 2024) is an international supplier of high-quality hydrocarbon products for the Mobility, Life Sciences, Industrial, and Energy sectors. The company’s headquarters are located in Frankfurt am Main, Germany.

In September 2023, the company was acquired by the International Chemical Investors Group (ICIG).[2]

The company’s products are marketed worldwide under the brands Haltermann Carless, ETS Racing Fuels, and Electrical Oil Services (EOS).

== History ==
- 1859: Carless was formed by Eugene Carless. Its base was the Hope Chemical Works in Hackney Wick.
- 1860: Carless became Carless, Blagdon and Company, when William George Blagdon joined in partnership.
- 1870: Carless, Blagdon and Company was dissolved by Blagdon. George Bligh Capel became a partner in the firm. Carless started selling a volatile inflammable petroleum distillate trademarked 'Petrol'. That is where the word "petrol" came from. At first it was often used as a solvent, including to remove nits by dissolving the natural glue that the female louse uses to stick the nit to the hair. When internal combustion engines were invented, petrol was found to be suitable fuel for them.
- 1872: Carless, Capel and Leonard formed. John Hare Leonard joined Capel as a partner. Carless was no longer a partner but was retained by the new company as the manager of its works.
- 1893: Frederick Simms, on behalf of Gottlieb Daimler, visited Carless, Capel, and Leonard to form and agreement to use the Launch Spirit for Daimler Launches. It was a result of this meeting that the company began to use the word Petrol to distinguish is product from other motor spirit products. The word 'petrol' is still the generic name for gasoline used throughout the UK.
- 1996: Petrochem Distribution BVBA was established.
- 2000: Petrochem UK acquired Carless from the Spanish Repsol-YPF Group. The resulting company is now called Petrochem Carless Ltd.
- 2013: The company was acquired by HCS Group and rebranded Haltermann Carless.

== Operations ==
The chemical company operates additional sites in Hamburg-Wilhelmsburg and Speyer (Germany), Harwich and Stanlow (United Kingdom), Bourgtheroulde (France), Troy, Michigan (USA), and Yokohama (Japan). All production sites are appropriately certified; the major sites additionally hold ISCC PLUS and ISCC EU certifications (Speyer, Hamburg, Harwich, and Bourgtheroulde)..
