= Harwich =

Town in Essex, England

Coordinates: 51°56′40″N 1°17′18″E

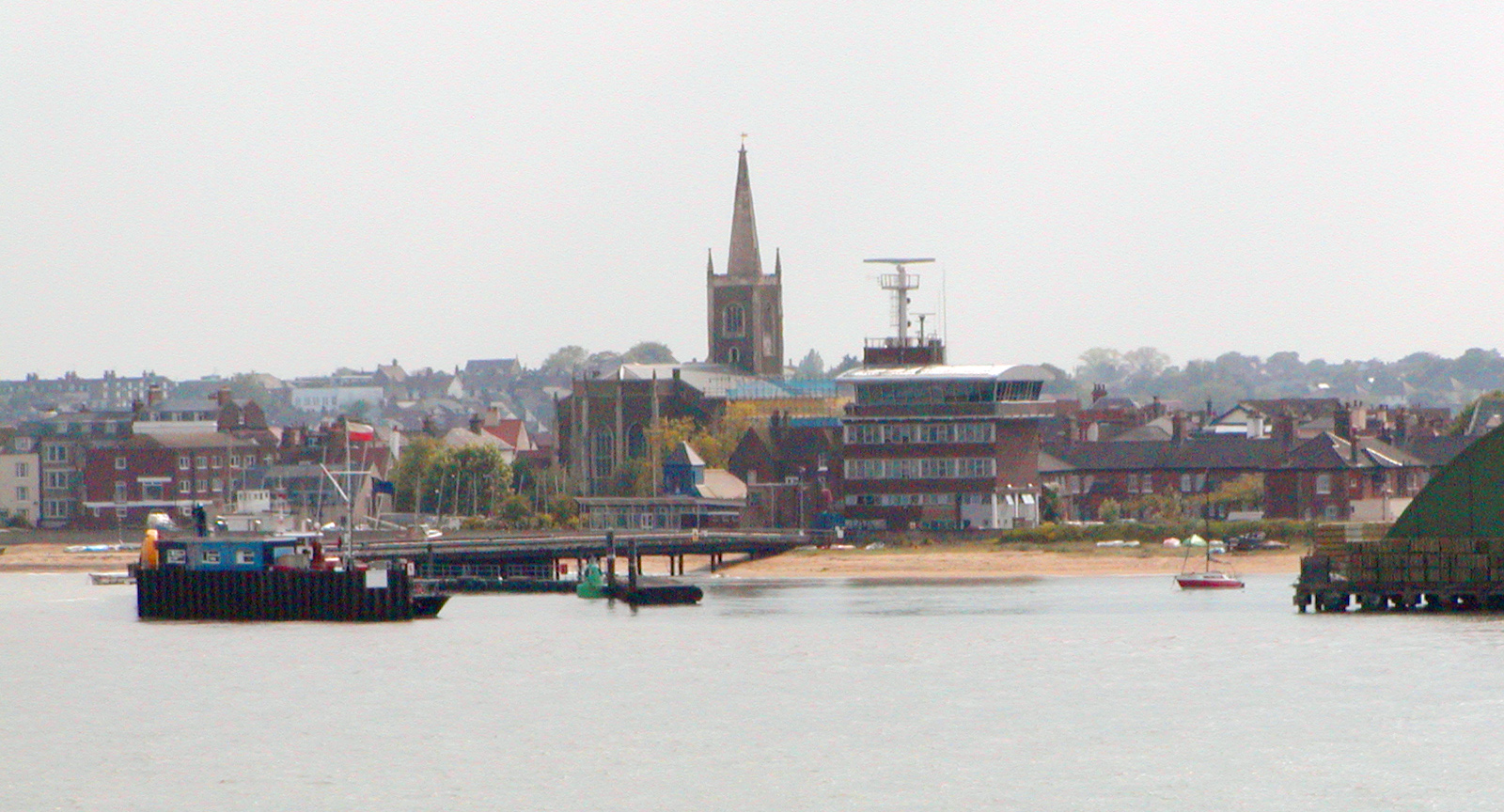

- Location within Essex
- Population: 18,794 (Parish, 2021); 20,215 (Built up area, 2021)
- OS grid reference: TM243313
- Civil parish: Harwich
- District: Tendring
- Shire county: Essex
- Region: East
- Country: England
- Sovereign state: United Kingdom
- Post town: HARWICH
- Postcode district: CO12
- Dialling code: 01255
- Police: Essex
- Fire: Essex
- Ambulance: East of England
- UK Parliament: Harwich and North Essex

Harwich (/ˈhærɪtʃ/) is a port town and civil parish in the Tendring district of Essex, England. It is one of the Haven ports on the North Sea coast. Nearby places include Felixstowe to the north-east, Ipswich to the north-west, Colchester to the south-west and Clacton-on-Sea to the south. It is the northernmost coastal town in Essex.

Its position on the estuaries of the Stour and Orwell rivers, with its usefulness to mariners as one of the safest ports between the Thames and the Humber, led to a long period of civil and military maritime significance. The town became a naval base in 1657 and was heavily fortified, with Harwich Redoubt, Beacon Hill Battery, and Bath Side Battery.

The Mayflower, which carried English Puritans to North America, was registered with Harwich as its home port, and Harwich is the presumed birthplace of Mayflower captain Christopher Jones.

The historic core of the town stands at the end of a peninsula. The built up area now extends westwards from the peninsula to include Dovercourt, which has been administered as part of Harwich since at least the 17th century. There are few retail facilities in the historic core of Harwich today, and Dovercourt now has the main retail town centre for the built up area. The main port facilities of Harwich International Port are now at Parkeston, about 1 mile (1.6 km) upstream on the Stour from the old town's quays.

At the 2021 census, the population of the parish of Harwich (which includes Dovercourt) was 18,794, and the population of the built up area as defined by the Office for National Statistics (which extends beyond Harwich parish to also include parts of the neighbouring parishes of Little Oakley and Ramsey and Parkeston) was 20,215.

== History ==
The town's name means "military settlement", from Old English here-wic.

Roman remains have been found in the area. In 885 the River Stour north of the town was the location for two battles.

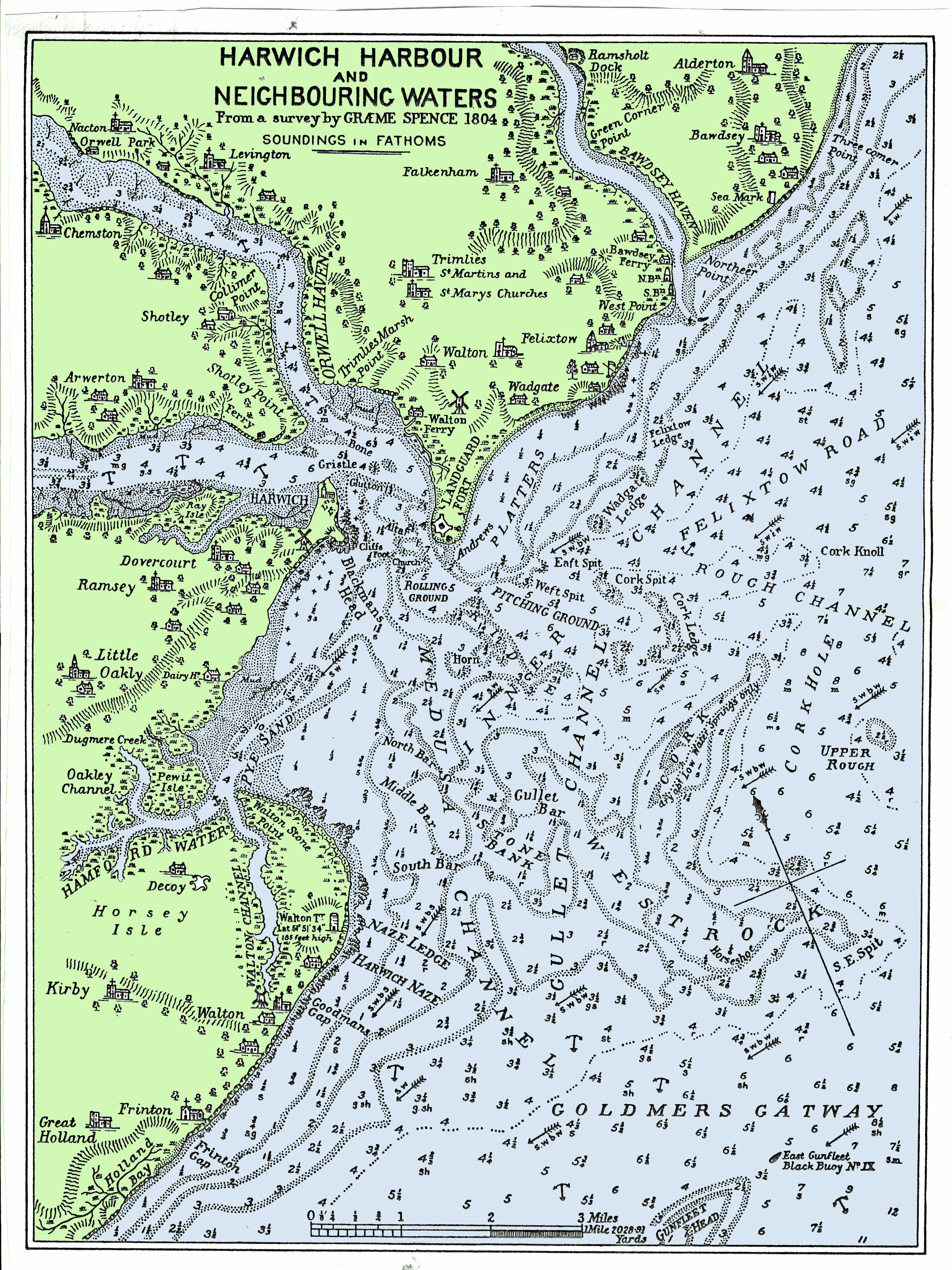
An 1804 chart of Harwich from a survey by Graeme Spence

Harwich was anciently part of the manor and parish of Dovercourt. The original village of Dovercourt was at what is now known as Upper Dovercourt, a little way inland. In 1177, a chapel of ease was recorded at Harwich, which was probably a very small settlement at that time. It was not until the Duke of Norfolk as lord of the manor obtained the right to hold a market at Harwich in 1253 that the town began to develop more significantly. Harwich was granted its first charter making it a borough in 1318. The town was deemed to be a separate parish for civil purposes by the 16th century, but remained part of the ecclesiastical parish of Dovercourt until 1871, when its chapel of St Nicholas was upgraded to being a parish church.

The town was the target of an abortive raid by French forces under Antonio Doria on 24 March 1339 during the Hundred Years' War.

The town is known to have been granted several borough charters in medieval times, but the earliest surviving charter was issued in 1604. This charter confirms that the borough covered the whole area of the two parishes of Harwich St Nicholas and Dovercourt; it is not clear whether Dovercourt was added to the borough by virtue of that charter or whether Dovercourt was already included in the borough under the earlier lost charters.

Because of its strategic position, Harwich was the target for the invasion of Britain by William of Orange on 11 November 1688. However, unfavourable winds forced his fleet to sail into the English Channel instead and eventually land at Torbay. Due to the involvement of the Schomberg family in the invasion, Charles Louis Schomberg was made Marquess of Harwich.

Writer Daniel Defoe devotes a few pages to the town in A tour thro' the Whole Island of Great Britain. Visiting in 1722, he noted its formidable fort and harbour "of a vast extent". The town, he recounts, was also known for an unusual chalybeate spring rising on Beacon Hill (a promontory to the north-east of the town), which "petrified" clay, allowing it to be used to pave Harwich's streets and build its walls. The locals also claimed that "the same spring is said to turn wood into iron", but Defoe put this down to the presence of "copperas" in the water. Regarding the atmosphere of the town, he states: "Harwich is a town of hurry and business, not much of gaiety and pleasure; yet the inhabitants seem warm in their nests and some of them are very wealthy".

In the late 19th century and early 20th century the hamlet of Lower Dovercourt, lying on the western edge of Harwich between the town and the older village of Upper Dovercourt, was significantly developed. Both Upper Dovercourt and Lower Dovercourt were being described as suburbs of Harwich by the early 20th century. Lying next to Dovercourt railway station, Lower Dovercourt came to be known as Dovercourt and it now has the main town centre for the Harwich built up area; there are today few retail facilities in the old town of Harwich.

=== Naval history ===
Harwich played an important part in the Napoleonic and more especially the two world wars. Of particular note:

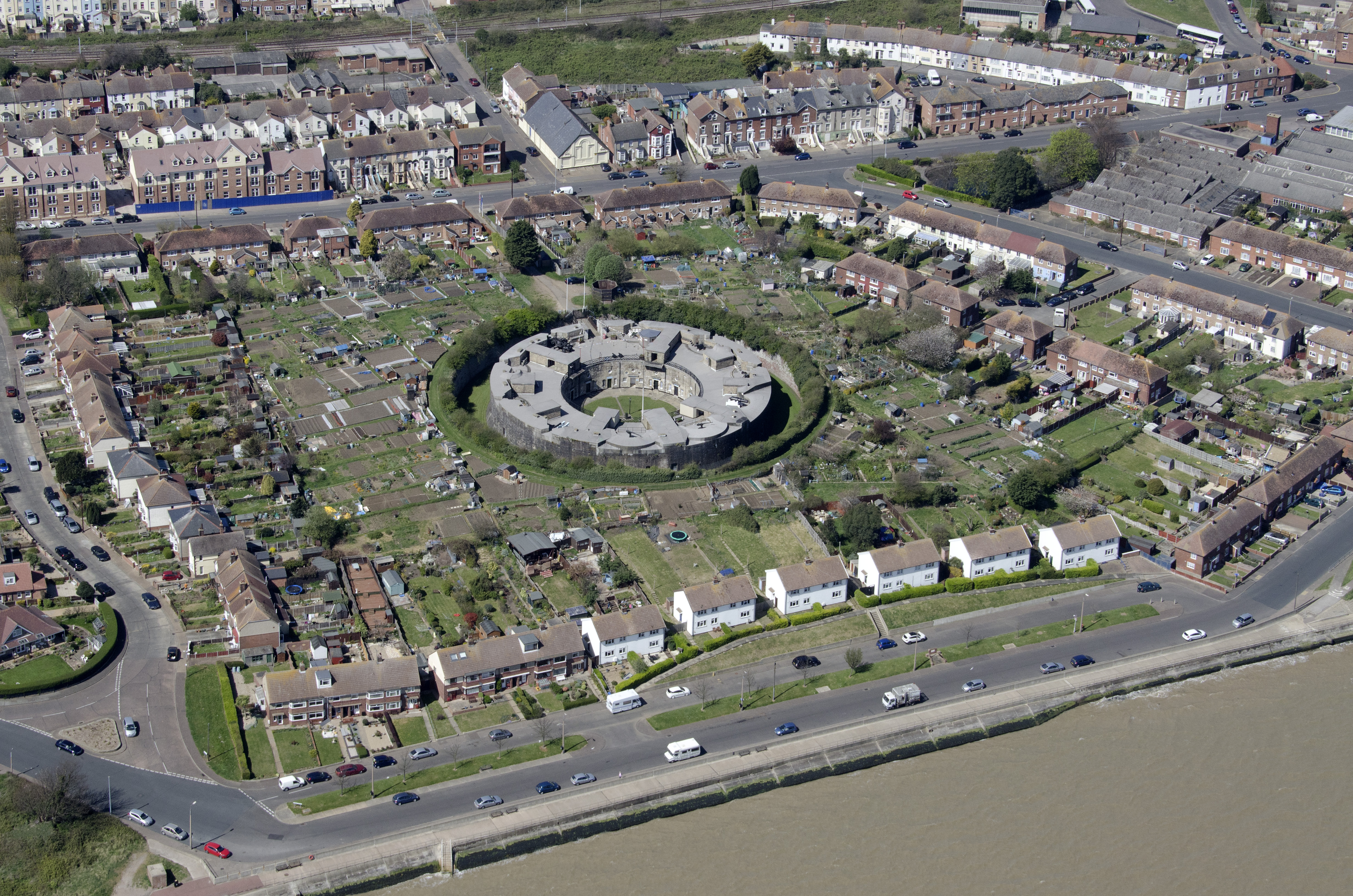
Harwich Redoubt

==== Napoleonic Wars ====
During the Napoleonic Wars, Harwich was a Post Office Station for communication with Europe, one of the embarkation and evacuation bases for expeditions to Holland in 1799, 1809, and 1813/14; base for capturing enemy privateers. The dockyard built many ships for the Navy, including HMS Conqueror which captured the French Admiral Villeneuve at the Battle of Trafalgar. The Redoubt and the now-demolished Ordnance Building date from that era.

==== First World War ====
The Harwich Force, a destroyer flotilla, was established at Harwich under Commodore Tyrwhitt in the run-up to the First World War. From 1916, destroyers from Harwich escorted Dutch food exports from the Hook of Holland, with "almost total success." In November 1918, the German U-boat fleet surrendered to the Royal Navy in the harbour.

==== Second World War ====
During the Second World War, Harwich was one of the main East Coast minesweeping and destroyer bases, at one period base for British and French submarines; assembled fleets for Dutch and Dunkirk evacuations and follow-up to D-Day; unusually, a target for Italian bombers during the Battle of Britain.

=== Royal Naval Dockyard ===
Harwich Dockyard was established as a Naval Dockyard in 1652. It ceased to operate as a Royal Dockyard in 1713 (though a Royal Navy presence was maintained until 1829). During the various wars with France and Holland, through to 1815, the dockyard was responsible for both building and repairing numerous warships. HMS Conqueror, a 74-gun ship completed in 1801, captured the French admiral Villeneuve at Trafalgar. The yard was then a semi-private concern, with the actual shipbuilding contracted to Joseph Graham, who was sometimes mayor of the town. During World War II parts of Harwich were again requisitioned for naval use and ships were based at HMS Badger; Badger was decommissioned in 1946, but the Royal Naval Auxiliary Service maintained a headquarters on the site until 1992.

=== Lighthouses ===
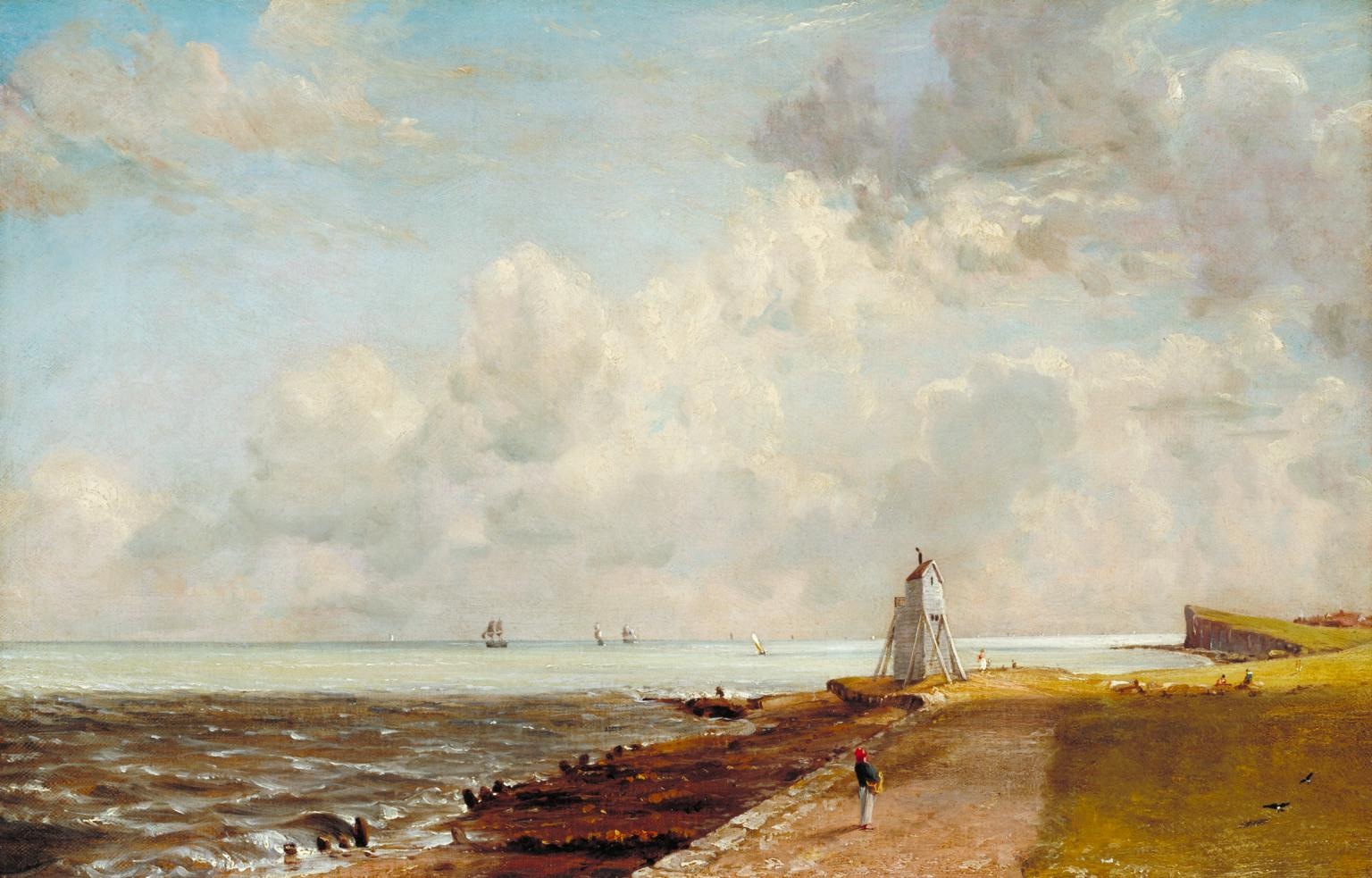
Harwich Lighthouse by John Constable, 1820

In 1665, not long after the establishment of the Dockyard, a pair of lighthouses were set up on the Town Green to serve as leading lights for ships entering the harbour. Completely rebuilt in 1818, both towers are still standing (though they ceased functioning as lighthouses in 1863, when they were replaced by the Dovercourt Lighthouses, a new pair of lights at Dovercourt).

== Transport ==
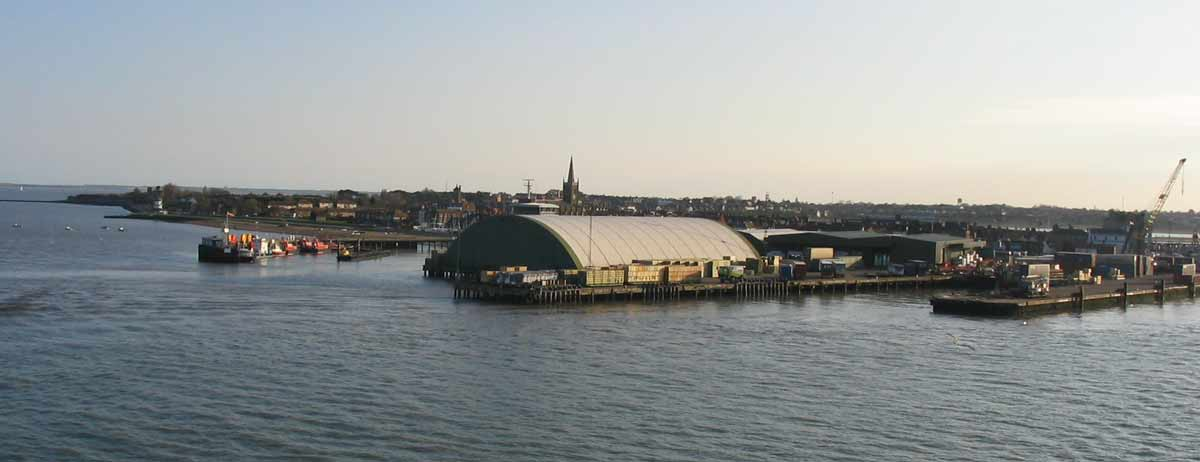
Harwich 'Navyard' and Harwich seen from the river

The Royal Navy no longer has a presence in Harwich but Harwich International Port at nearby Parkeston continues to offer regular ferry services to the Hook of Holland (Hoek van Holland) in the Netherlands. Many operations of the Port of Felixstowe and of Trinity House, the lighthouse authority, are managed from Harwich.

The Mayflower railway line serves Harwich and there are three operational passenger stations: Harwich International, Dovercourt and Harwich Town. The line also allows freight trains to access the Port.

The port is famous for the phrase "Harwich for the Continent", seen on road signs and in London and North Eastern Railway (LNER) advertisements.

From 1924 to 1987 (with a break during the Second World War), a train ferry service operated between Harwich and Zeebrugge. The train ferry linkspan still exists today and the rails leading from the former goods yard of Harwich Town railway station are still in position across the road, although the line is blocked by the Trinity House buoy store.

== Architecture ==
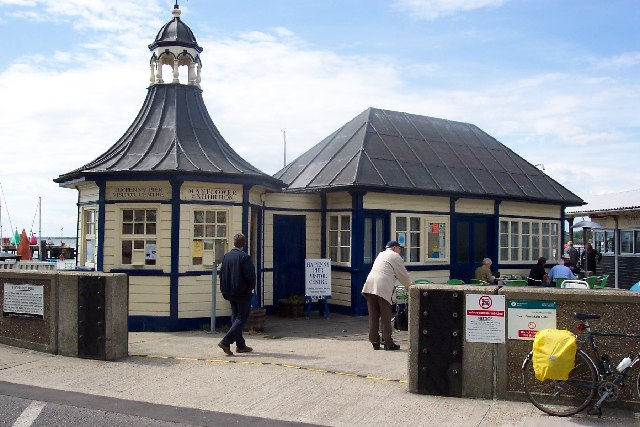
The Halfpenny Pier

Despite, or perhaps because of, its small size Harwich is highly regarded in terms of architectural heritage, and the whole of the older part of the town, excluding Navyard Wharf, is a conservation area.

The regular street plan with principal thoroughfares connected by numerous small alleys indicates the town's medieval origins, although many buildings of this period are hidden behind 18th century facades.

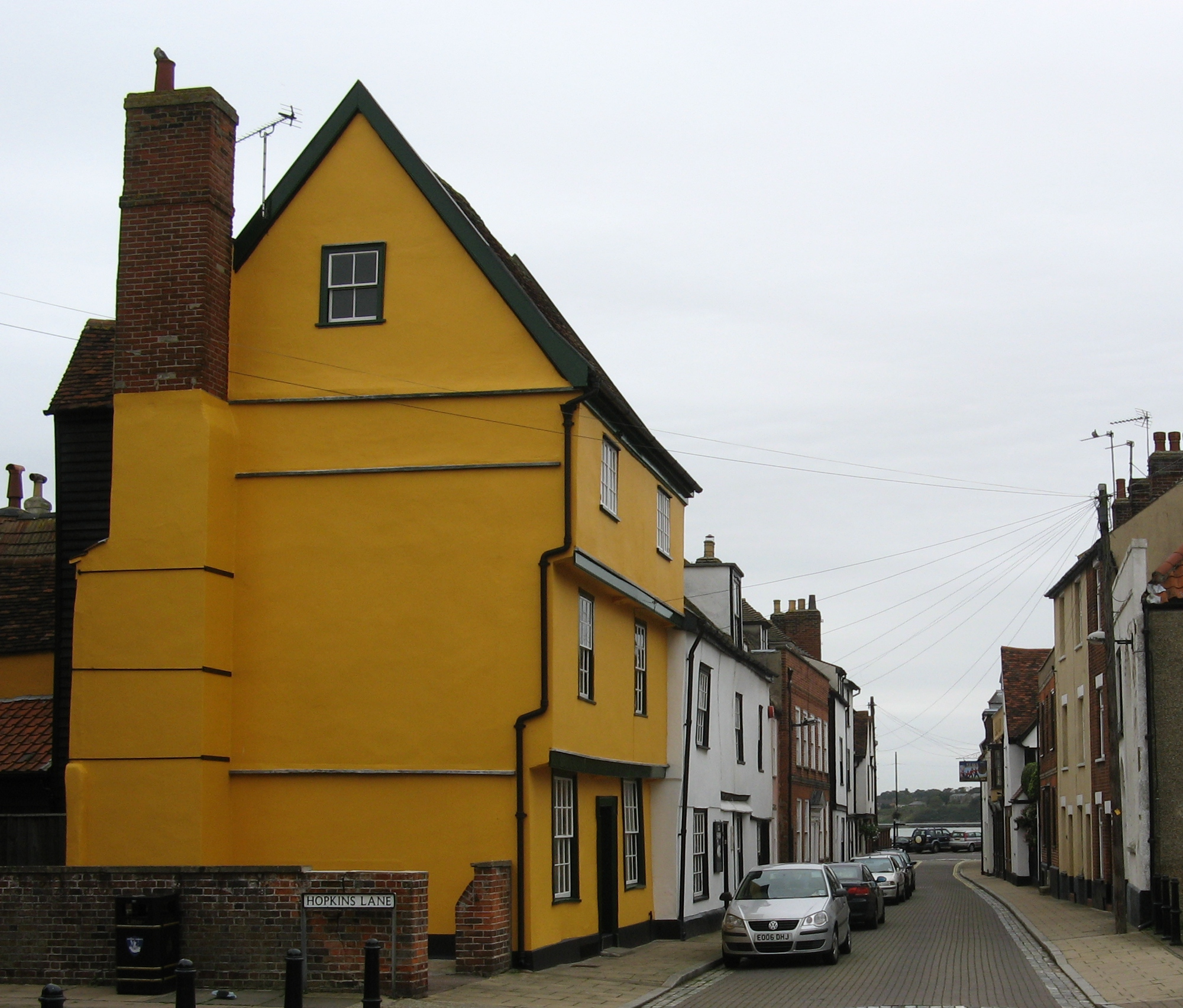
King's Head Street

The extant medieval structures are largely private homes. The house featured in the image of Kings Head St to the left is unique in the town and is an example of a sailmaker's house, thought to have been built circa 1600. Notable public buildings include the parish church of St. Nicholas of 1820–1822 (architect: M G Thompson of Dedham), in a restrained Gothic style, with many original furnishings, including a somewhat altered organ in the west end gallery. There is also the Harwich Guildhall of 1769, the only Grade I listed building in Harwich.

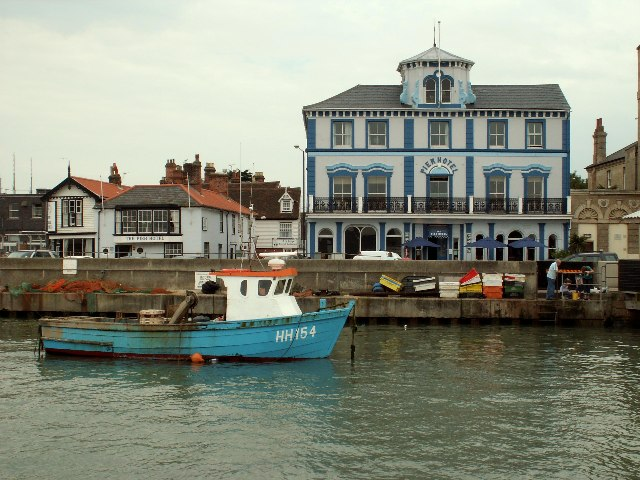
Pier Hotel

The Pier Hotel of 1860 and the building that was the Great Eastern Hotel of 1864 can both be seen on the quayside, both reflecting the town's new importance to travellers following the arrival of the Great Eastern Main Line from Colchester in 1854. In 1923, The Great Eastern Hotel was closed by the newly formed LNER, as the Great Eastern Railway had opened a new hotel with the same name at the new passenger port at Parkeston Quay, causing a decline in numbers. The hotel became the Harwich Town Hall, which included the Magistrates Court and, following changes in local government, was sold and divided into apartments.

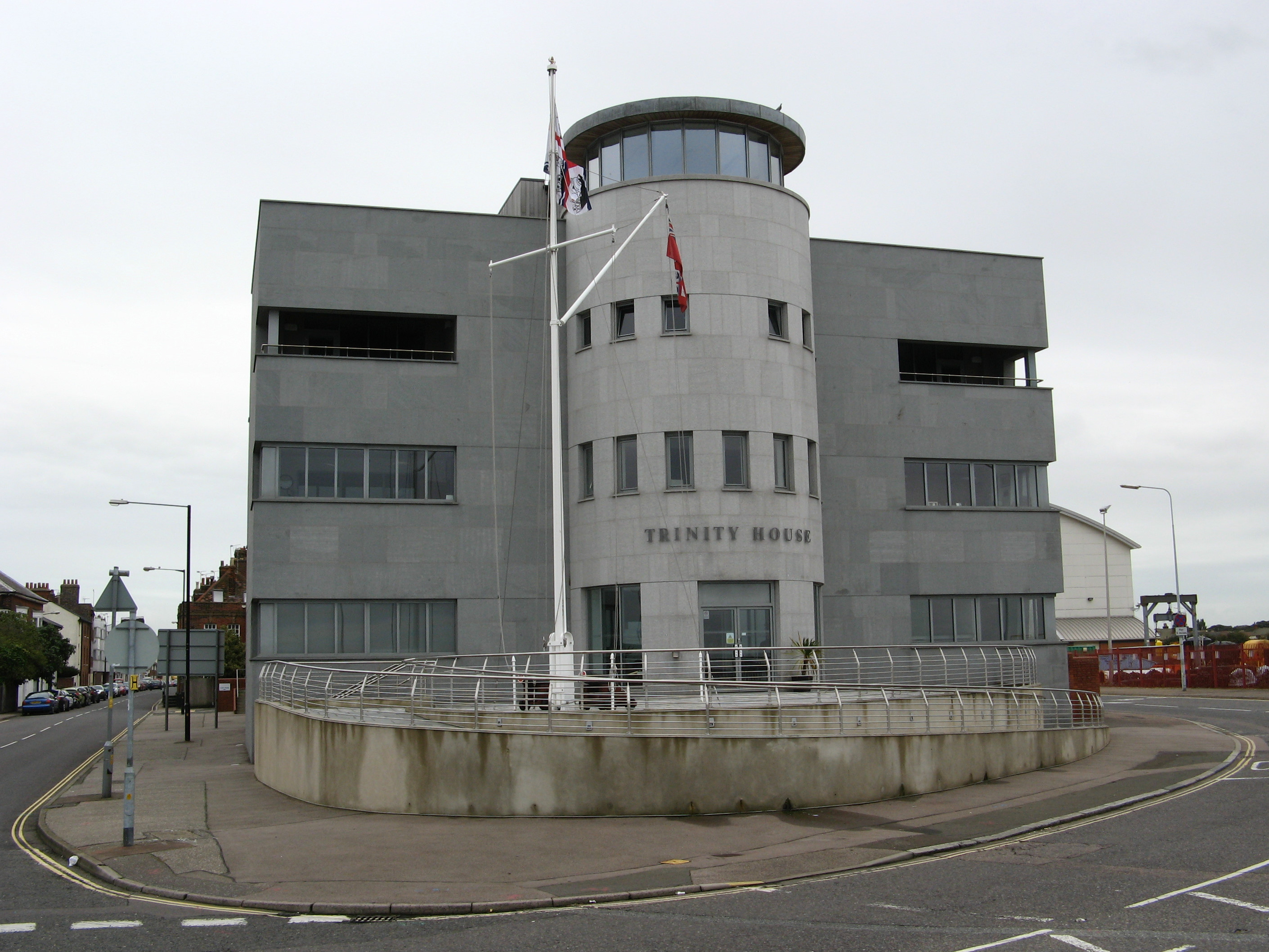
The Trinity House offices

Also of interest are the High Lighthouse (1818), the unusual Treadwheel Crane (late 17th century), the Old Custom Houses on West Street, a number of Victorian shopfronts and the Electric Palace Cinema (1911), one of the oldest purpose-built cinemas to survive complete with its ornamental frontage and original projection room still intact and operational.

There is little notable building from the later parts of the 20th century, but major recent additions include the lifeboat station and two new structures for Trinity House. The Trinity House office building, next door to the Old Custom Houses, was completed in 2005. All three additions are influenced by the high-tech style.

== Governance ==
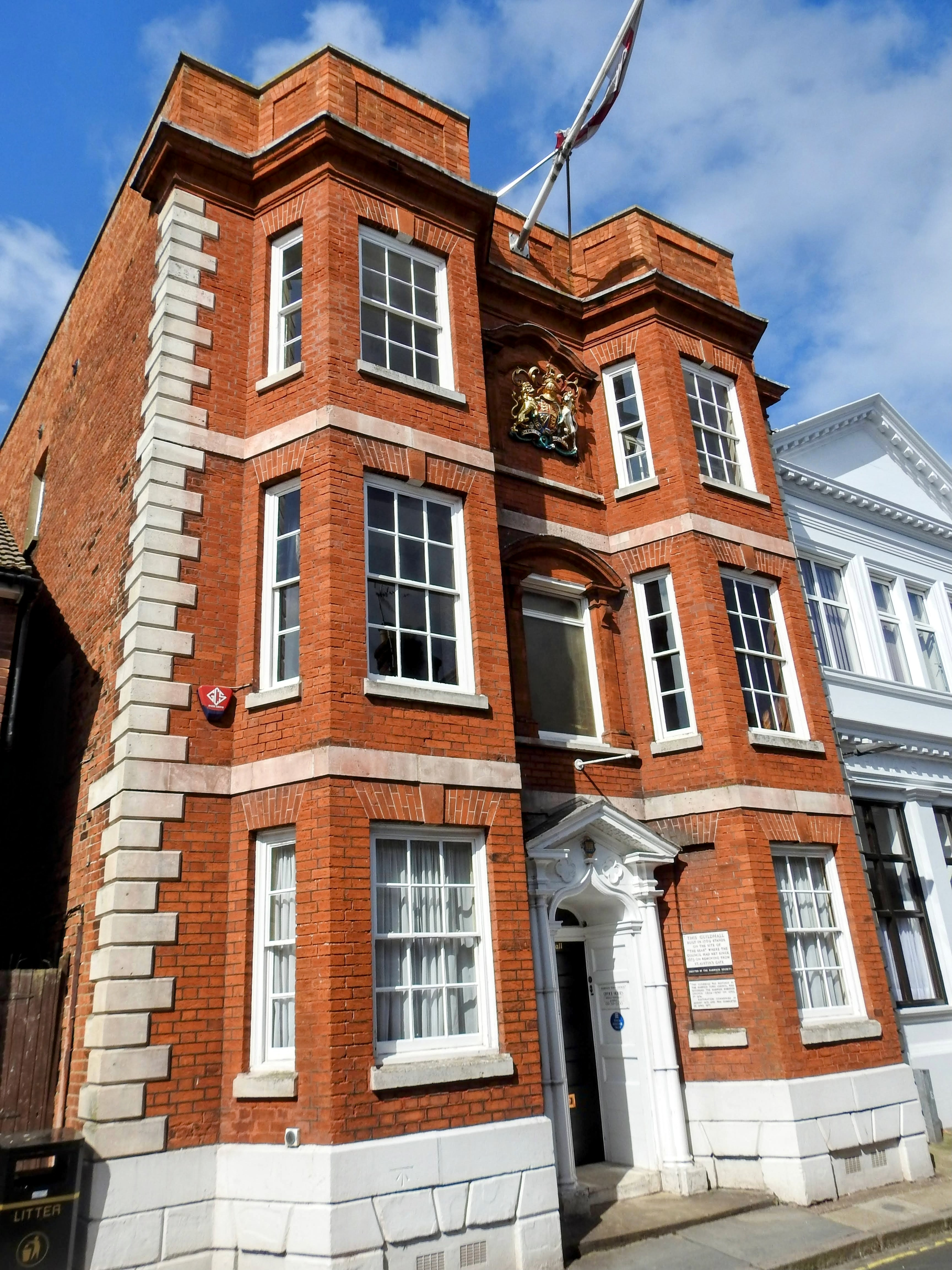
Harwich Guildhall

There are three tiers of local government covering Harwich, at parish (town), district and county level: Harwich Town Council, Tendring District Council, and Essex County Council. The town council is based at Harwich Guildhall at 11 Church Street.

=== Administrative history ===
The town was granted its first borough charter in 1318. It was administered by a portreeve until 1604 when a new charter formally incorporated the borough and established a council led by a mayor. From 1604 the borough also served as a constituency for parliamentary elections, as the Harwich parliamentary borough.

The borough was reformed to become a municipal borough in 1836 under the Municipal Corporations Act 1835, which standardised how most boroughs operated across the country. From at least the 1604 charter, the borough had covered the two parishes of Harwich St Nicholas and Dovercourt. In 1925 the two parishes were merged into a single parish of Harwich matching the borough.

The borough of Harwich was abolished in 1974 under the Local Government Act 1972, when the area became part of the new Tendring district. A successor parish called Harwich was created as part of the 1974 reforms, covering the area of the abolished borough, with its parish council taking the name Harwich Town Council.

== International Shanty Festival ==
A Harwich International Shanty Festival was set up in 2006 to organise and co-ordinate an annual sea shanty festival in October. Through concerts, 'singarounds', pub sessions, talks and workshops, the seafaring history and heritage of Harwich is celebrated by local people and international groups. This event for Essex attracts audiences countrywide and beyond. The festival is one of the biggest shanty festivals in the country.

== Notable residents ==
Harwich has also historically hosted a number of notable inhabitants, linked with Harwich's maritime past.

- Christopher Newport (1561–1617), seaman and privateer, captain of the expedition that founded Jamestown, Virginia
- Christopher Jones (c.1570–1622) Captain of the 1620 voyage of the Pilgrim ship Mayflower
- Thomas Cobbold (1708–1767), brewer and owner of Three Cups
- William Shearman (1767–1861), physician and medical writer
- James Francillon (1802–1866), barrister and legal writer
- Captain Charles Fryatt (1872–1916), mariner executed by the Germans, brought back from Belgium and buried at Dovercourt
- Peter Firmin (1928–2018), artist and puppet maker
- Randolph Stow (1935–2010), reclusive but award-winning Australian-born writer made his home in Harwich
- Myles de Vries (born 1940), first-class cricketer
- Liana Bridges (born 1969) actress, best known for co-presenting Sooty & Co
- Kate Hall (born 1983), British-Danish singer
- Dan Rowe, singer

=== Politicians ===
- Sir John Jacob, 1st Baronet of Bromley (c.1597–1666), politician who sat in the House of Commons in 1640 and 1641
- Sir Capel Luckyn, 2nd Baronet (1622–1680), politician who sat in the House of Commons variously between 1647 and 1679
- Samuel Pepys (1633–1703), diarist and member of parliament (MP) for Harwich
- Sir Anthony Deane (1638–1721), mayor of Harwich, naval architect, Master Shipwright, commercial shipbuilder and MP
- Lieutenant-General Edward Harvey (1718–1788) Adjutant-General to the Forces and MP for Harwich 1768 to 1778
- Tony Newton, Baron Newton of Braintree (1937–2012), Conservative politician and former Cabinet member
- Nick Alston (born 1952), Conservative Essex Police and Crime Commissioner
- Bernard Jenkin (born 1959), Conservative politician, MP for Harwich and North Essex since 2010
- Andrew Murrison (born 1961), doctor and Conservative Party politician, MP since 2001

== Sport ==
Harwich is home to Harwich & Parkeston F.C.; Harwich and Dovercourt RFC; Harwich Rangers FC; Sunday Shrimpers; Harwich & Dovercourt Sailing Club; Harwich, Dovercourt & Parkeston Swimming Club; Harwich & Dovercourt Rugby Union Football Club; Harwich & Dovercourt Cricket Club; and Harwich Runners who with support from Harwich Swimming Club host the annual Harwich Triathlons.

== Media ==
Local news and television programmes are provided by BBC East and ITV Anglia. Television signals are received from the Sudbury transmitting station and the local relay transmitter.

The town is served by both BBC Essex and BBC Radio Suffolk. Other radio stations including Heart East, Greatest Hits Radio Essex, Actual Radio, Nation Radio Suffolk and Radio Mi Amigo, a community based station which broadcast from The Harwich Quay.

The town is served by the local newspaper, Harwich and Manningtree Standard which publishes on Fridays.

== Arms ==
Coat of arms of Harwich
Notes Granted to Harwich Borough Council on 15 December 1943. Crest On a wreath of the colours upon waves of the sea Proper an ancient ship with one mast Or at the bow and stern turrets and affixed below the top of the mast a tower Argent the sail furled of the last and flying to the dexter a pennon Gules. Escutcheon Gules a portcullis chained Or studded and spiked Azure. Motto Omnia Bona Bonis (To The Good All Things Are Good).

== See also ==
- Harwich Force
- Harwich Redoubt
- Harwich (UK Parliament constituency)
- Harwich and Dovercourt High School
- Harwich Lifeboat Station
- Harwich Mayflower Heritage Centre
- Harwich refinery
