= List of Stena Line vessels =

This page shows a fleet history of the Swedish ferry company Stena Line.

== Chronological (complete) ==
Stena Line's passenger, car-passenger, multi-purpose, Ropax and RoRo ships are added, with Stena RoRo's passenger, RoPax and RoRo ships.

=== 1960-1969 ===
- MS Østersøen (1962 - 1963, Chartered) Built in 1954. Scrapped in Italy in 1995.
- MS Isefjord (1963 - 1966) Built in 1935. Later with Medmar as Agostino Lauro. Scrapped in Aliaga, Turkey in 2008.
- MS Gorch Fock (1963 - 1964, Chartered) Built in 1963.
- MS Seute Deern (1963, Chartered) Built in 1961.
- MS Helgoland (1963 (Chartered), 1964 - 1965 (Chartered), 1972 - 1974, 1974 - 1976 (Chartered Out)) Built in 1963. Renamed Stena Finlandica in 1972 when bought by Stena Line, and Baltic Star in 1974.
- MS Hein Godenwind (1964, Chartered) Built in 1960. Sank in Gibraltar harbour in 2007 then scrapped there a year later.
- SS Skagen 1 (1963 (Chartered), 1964 - 1965) Built in 1914. Sold in 1965. Scrapped in Nakskov, Denmark in 1970.
- SS Skagen 2 (1963 - 1968) Built in 1924. Scrapped in Ystad, Sweden in 1968.
- MS Poseidon (1964 - 1973) Sold in 1973. Chartered Out to Brittany Ferries in 1973, after being sold.
- MS Afrodite (1964 - 1971) Sold in 1971.
- MS Wappen (1964 - 1966) Built in 1962. Sold in 1966. Scrapped in Aliaga, Turkey in 2014.
- MS Seebad Warnemünde (1964, 1965, 1966, Chartered) Built in 1961. Sunk to form a part of a reef in Bayahibe in 2009.
- MS Stena Danica (I) (1965 - 1969) Sold in 1969 to Government of Canada, Ministry of Transport.
- MS Stena Nordica (I) (1965 - 1973) Chartered Out to Caledonian Steam Packet Co (Irish Services) and Burns & Laird between 1966 - 1971. Sold in 1973.
- MS Prinsessan Christina (1966, Chartered) Built in 1960. Operated under the stage name The Londoner between Tilbury and Calais.
- MS Völkerfreundschaft (1966 - 1985 (winter), Chartered) Built in 1948 as Stockholm. Chartered for cruises from Gothenburg to the Caribbean and North Cape. Renamed Astoria in 2016, scrapped in 2025.
- MS Stena Baltica (I) (1966 - 1970) Sold in 1970 to Caledonian Steam Packet Co, renamed Caledonia. Scrapped in Aliaga, Turkey in 2006.
- MS Stena Germanica (I) (1967 - 1979) Sold in 1979 to Corsica Ferries. Scrapped in 1989 after being wrecked off Puerto Rico.
- MS Stena Britannica (I) (1967 - 1968) Sold in 1968 to the State of Alaska, Department of Public Works. Scrapped in Aliaga, Turkey in 2001.
- MS Stena Danica (II) (1969 - 1974) Sold in April 1974 to BC Ferries. Wrecked in 2006 enroute from Prince Rupert to Port Hardy.

=== 1970-1979 ===
- MS Stena Carrier (I) (1970 - 1974 (Chartered Out)) Chartered to Canadian Ministry of Transport. Scrapped in Aliaga, Turkey in 2011.
- MS Stubbenkammer (1971) Ordered by a Canadian Shipping Company but delivered to Stena Line for charter and sale to Deutsche Reichsbahn, East Germany. Scrapped in Sidor, Venezuela in 2007.
- MS Viking II (1971, Chartered) Built in 1964. Sunk while enroute from Trinidad to Venezuela in 2011.
- MS Stena Trailer (1972 - 1982 (Chartered Out), 1982 - 1983, 1983 - 1985 (Chartered Out)) Renamed Dalriada in 1972, Viking Trader in 1980, Stena Trader (III) in 1981. Sank on 16 November 2006 as a result of a fire in the engine room.
- MS Anderida (1972) Sold to Sealink before commencing service. When enroute from Lagos to Dakar the ship was attacked and was let to run aground by the hijackers and abandoned it.
- MS Alvpilen (1972 - 1974) Built in 1946.
- MS Stena Olympica (1972 - 1982) Sold in 1982 to Prince of Fundy Cruises, renamed Scotia Prince. Scrapped in Chittagong, Bangladesh in 2012.
- MS Stena Atlantica (I) (1972 - 1973) Built in 1966. Sold in 1973 to Finnlines. Scrapped in Aliaga, Turkey in 2003.
- MS Stena Transporter (I) (1973 - 1975 (Chartered Out)) Built in 1973. Renamed Jarl Transporter before delivery, reverted in 1975.
- MS Stena Trailer (1973 - 1978 (Numerous Charters)) Built in 1973. Renamed Nopal Sky in 1974, reverted in 1975, Kirk Trailer in 1978. Scrapped in Aliaga, Turkey in 2009.
- MS Stena Jutlandica (I) (1973 - 1982, 1982 - 1983 (Chartered Out to CN Marine)) Renamed Jutlandica in 1982 and Bluenose in 1983. Sold to CN Marine then Marine Atlantic in 1983. Scrapped in Aliaga, Turkey in 2010.
- MS Skagen (III) (1973, Chartered) Built in 1958.
- MV Stena Seatrader (I) (1973 - 1987 (Numerous Charters), 1987 - 2015) Renamed Seatrader in 1973, Bahjah in 1976, Stena Searider in 1982, and Stena Scanrail in 1987. Scrapped in Pakistan in 2021.
- MV Stena Shipper (I) (1973 - 1999 (Numerous Charters)) Renamed Union Wellington in 1973, Alpha Express in 1976, Stena Shipper in 1980 and 1988, Speedlink Vanguard in 1981, Caribe Express in 1987, Kirk Shipper in 1988, and Normandie Shipper in 1989. Scrapped in Aliaga, Turkey in 2013.
- MV Stena Sailer (1973 - 1989 (Numerous Charters)) Renamed Farha in 1975 and Stena Seatrader (II) in 1981. Scrapped in Alang, India in 2011.
- MS Stena Scandinavica (I) (1973 - 1978, 1978 (Chartered)) Sold to Irish Continental Line, then chartered back for 2 months. Renamed Saint Killian in 1978. Scrapped in Alang, India in 2007.
- MS Stena Nordica (II) (1974 - 1988, 1992 - 1996 (Chartered)) Renamed Stena Danica (III) in 1974 before entering service, Stena Nordica (II) in 1981, Stena Nautica (IV) in 1984, Versailles in 1987, and Stena Londoner in 1992. Chartered to SNCF in 1987. Scrapped in Aliaga, Turkey in 2005.
- MS Stena Normandica (1974 - 1985) Had numerous charters throughout her Stena career, mostly for spells of relief. Sold to Sealink British Ferries in 1985. Still in service with Moby Lines as Moby Vincent.
- MS Stena Nautica (I) (1974 - 1979 (Chartered Out)) Did not serve under this name. Chartered to CN Marine and renamed Marine Nautica. Still in service with Corsica Ferries.
- MS Stena Atlantica (II) (1975 - 1979 (Chartered Out)). Did not serve under this name, renamed Stena Nautica (II) for her launch. Chartered to CN Marine and renamed Marine Atlantica. Still in service with Corsica Ferries.
- MS Stena Nordica (III) (1975 - 1983) Chartered Out to Soutos-Hellas Ferries and CN Marine for relief multiple times. Renamed Greece in 1978 - 79, 1980 and 1981 - 82 when on charter to Hellas Ferries, Stena Nautica (III) in 1982. Sold in 1983. Scrapped in Aliaga, Turkey in 2015.
- MS Stena Trailer (1975, 2004 - 2011) Delivered for Stena then sold to P&O Ferries. Renamed Bison for delivery, European Pioneer in 1998 and Stena Pioneer in 2004 when bought back. In 1995 she was rebuilt with an extra trailer deck. Scrapped in Aliaga, Turkey in 2014.
- MS Stena Traveller (I) (1975, 2004 - 2011) Launched for Stena then sold to P&O Ferries. Renamed Buffalo for delivery, European Leader in 1998 and Stena Leader in 2004 when bought back. Lengthened by 12.5m in 1989 and 15m in 1998. Scrapped in Aliaga, Turkey in 2014.
- MS Stena Trader (I) (1975 - 1980 (Chartered Out), 2004 - 2011) Renamed Union Melbourne for delivery, Union Trader in 1980, Puma in 1980, European Seafarer in 1998, and Stena Seafarer in 2004 when bought back. Scrapped in Aliaga, Turkey in 2014.
- MS Drottningen (1976, Chartered) Built in 1968. Scrapped in 2005.
- MS Viking Victory (1976, Chartered) Built in 1964. Scrapped in Aliaga, Turkey in 2008.
- MV Stena Tender (1976) Sold between launch and delivery to United Baltic Co as Goya . Later European Navigator. Scrapped in Adabiya, Egypt in 2014.
- MV Stena Topper (1977 - 1990) Renamed Darnia in 1977. Scrapped in Aliaga, Turkey in 2007.
- MV Stena Timer (1977 - 1978 (Chartered Out), 1978 - 1981) Chartered to P&O between 1977 and 1978 as Jaguar. Scrapped in Chittagong, Bangladesh in 2004.
- MV Merzario Ausonia (1977 - 1987 (Numerous Charters) 1987 - 2004) Renamed Stena Freighter (I) in 1980 and Global Freighter in 2004. Sold to Lillbacka Powerco Oy in 2004. Scrapped in Alang, India in 2011.
- MV Stena Runner (1977 - 1994 (Numerous Charters), 2002 - 2010) Renamed Alpha Progress on completion, Hellas in 1979, Doric Ferry in 1986, European Tideway in 1992, Ideway in 2002 and Stena Transfer in 2002. Lengthened by 33.6m in 1982. Sold to P&O Ferries in 1994 and bought back in 2002. Scrapped in Alang, India in 2012.
- MV Elk (1977 - 1978 (Chartered Out to P&O Ferries)) Sold to P&O in 1978. Scrapped in Alang, India in 2011.
- MV Stena Shipper (II) (1977 - 1986 (Numerous Charters), 1986 - 1987) Sold to Nordstrom & Thulin in 1987. Scrapped in Aliaga, Turkey in 2010.
- MV Stena Prosper (1978 - 1988 (Numerous Charters), 2002 - 2010) Renamed Stena Ionia in 1982, Stena Gothica (I) in 1985 and Finnbirch in 1996. During heavy seas on 31 October 2006 when enroute from Helsinki to Arhus, she suffered a severe list and cargo shift and eventually capsized.
- MV Stena Grecia (1978 - 1987 (Numerous Charters)) Sold to Marine Atlantic after a short charter and renamed Atlantic Freighter. In service in Greek Isles as of 2022.
- MV Stena Project (1978 - 1986 (Numerous Charters), 1986 - 1988, 1988 (Chartered Out)) Renamed Stena Hispania in 1983, Stena Britannica (II) in 1986. Sold in 1988. Scrapped in Alang, India in 2011.
- MV Alpha Enterprise (1978 - 1983 (Numerous Charters), 1983 - 1985, 2002 - 2010, 2012 - 2016 (Chartered)) Sold in 1985, bought back in 2002 from P&O Ferries. Renamed Syria in 1979, Stena Transporter (III) in 1983, Cerdic Ferry in 1985, European Freeway in 1992, Freeway in 2002 and Stena Partner in 2003. Lengthened by 33.6m in 1981. Chartered in 2012 for Stena Sealines services and later in service in the Mediterranean. Sold to Turkey in 2021 and renamed Cenk T.
- MV Imparca Express I (1978 - 2004 (Numerous Charters)) Renamed Stena Carrier (II) in 1980. Scrapped in Aliaga, Turkey in 2012.
- MV Merzario Espania (1978 - 1982 (Numerous Charters), 1982 (Falklands Requisition), 1982 - 1994, 2002 - 2009) Sold in 1984, then bought back in 2002 from P&O Ferries. Renamed Nordic Ferry in 1980, Pride of Flanders in 1992, Flanders in 2002 and Stena Transporter (V) in 2002. Had additional passenger accommodation between 1986 and 1995 for 688 passengers. Scrapped in Turkey in 2017.
- MV Stena Trader (II) (1978 - 1982 (Numerous Charters), 1982 - 1983 (Falklands Requisition), 1983 - 1984) Renamed Stena Transporter (II) in 1978 and Baltic Ferry in 1980. Scrapped in Alang, India in 2011.
- MS Stena Oceanica (1978 - 1988, 1988 - 1997 (Numerous Charters)) Built in 1967. Renamed Stena Saga (I) in 1979 and Lion Queen in 1988. Carried out charters as a casino ship in the USA. Scrapped in Alang, India in 2021.
- MS Stena Baltica (II) (1978 – 1982) Built in 1966. Between 1979 and 1981 she was used as an accommodation ship for several oil projects and oil rigs on the Sullom Voe oil field, off Shetland. Sold in 1982. Scrapped in Alang, India in 2004.
- MS Scandinavica (1978 - 1981, Chartered) Built in 1973, MS Bolero chartered from Fred. Olsen Lines.
- MS Dana Sirena (1978, Chartered) Built in 1969.
- MS Thomas Wehr (1978 - 1979, Chartered) Built in 1977.
- MS Fuldatal (1979, 1981, Chartered) Built in 1971.

=== 1980-1989 ===
- MS Stena Sailer (1980 - 1988, 1990 - 1991) Built in 1974. Sold to Sealink in 1988 as St Cybi, then bought back with Sealink Stena Line. Scrapped in Aliaga, Turkey in 2006.
- MS RoRo Anglia (1981 - 1983, Chartered) Built in 1972. Scrapped in Aliaga, Turkey in 2012.
- MS Argo (1981 - 1985, Chartered) Built in 1976.
- MS Kronprinsessan Victoria (1981 - 2023, 2023 (Chartered Out), 2023 - ) Renamed Stena Saga (II) in 1988, Stena Europe in 1994, Lion Europe in 1997 for a Charter to Lion Ferry, and Stena Europe in 1998. Still owned by Stena RoRo, but in use with Africa Morocco Link, which is half owned by Stena.
- MS Prinsessan Birgitta (I) (1981 - 1989) Built in 1974. Renamed Stena Scandinavica (II) in 1982, Scandinavica in 1987 when on charter to Sealink British Ferries and Terek L in 1989. Scrapped in Alang, India in 2022.
- MS Prinsessan Desirée (1981 - 1993) Built in 1971. Renamed Europafärjan in 1983, Europafärjan II in 1985, Lion Princess in 1987. Sold in 1993.
- MS Prinsessan Christina (1982 - 1999) Built 1969. Renamed Stena Nordica (IV) in 1983, Europafärjan I in 1985, Lion Prince in 1985, and Stena Prince in 1998. Scrapped in Alang, India in 2022.
- MS Prinsessan Birgitta (II) (1982 - 1983, 1983 - 1989 (Chartered Out), 1989 - 1997 (Chartered)) Chartered to Sealink UK in 1983. Renamed St Nicholas in 1983, Stena Normandy in 1991 and Normandy in 1997. Scrapped in Alang, India in 2012.
- MS Europafärjan III (1982 - 1983) Built in 1974. Sold in 1983.
- MS Mariner (1982 - 1995 (Numerous Charters)) Bought by Stena in a damaged condition, renamed Stena Mariner in 1983, Salah L in 1990, Senator in 1993 and Stena Mariner in 1994. Grounded then partially sank off the coast of Chile in August 2014, she was scuttled by the navy a year later.
- MS Stena Danica (IV) (1983 - ) Still serves today.
- MS Stena Jutlandica (II) (1983 - 2002) Renamed Stena Empereur in 1996 and P&OSL Provence in 1998. Sold to P&O Ferries in 2002. Scrapped in Alang, India in 2011.
- MS Stena Baltica (III) (1983) Built in 1973. Sold to USSR Baltic Shipping Co. before entering service, renamed Ilich. Scrapped in Alang, India in 2021.
- MS Stena Baltica (IV) (1984 - 1989 (Chartered Out)) Built in 1971. Renamed Island Fiesta in 1984 and Scandinavian Star in 1984.
- MS Stena Driver (1984 - 1985, 2003 - 2005 (Chartered), 2012 - 2024) Built in 1981, renamed Ask in 1991, Stena Gothica (III) in 2012, when bought by Stena Line again. Sold in 2024 to Universal Maritime Management.
- MS Stena Polonica (1984) Launched in 1984, order cancelled in 1986 due to build issues, finally completed in 1992 for ANEK Lines. Still in service for Blue Star Ferries.
- MS Stena Baltica (V) (1985) Did not serve with any company, order cancelled in 1986 before completion due to problems with the shipyard. Renamed Regent Sky in 1990, to be converted into a cruise ship. Scrapped in Aliaga, Turkey in 2012.
- MS Saint Patrick II (1985 - 1986, Chartered) Built in 1973. Named MV C.T.M.A Vacancier since 2002.
- MS Saudi Express (1986, Chartered) Built in 1978. Order was originally for a tanker. Scrapped in Alang, India in 2010.
- MS Stena Nordica (V) (1986 - 1988) Built in 1973. Sold in 1988 to Jadrolinija.
- MS Stena Germanica (II) (1987 - ) Still serves today. Renamed Stena Scandinavica (IV) in 1986 and Stena Spirit in 2011.
- MS Stena Scandinavica (III) (1987 - 2025) Renamed Stena Germanica (III) in 1986 and Stena Vision in 2010. Sold to Corsica Ferries in November 2025.
- MS Belinda (1987, Chartered) Built in 1979. Scrapped in Alang, India in 2012.
- MS Stena Trailer (1987 - 1999) Built in 1978. Renamed Trailer in 1991, Stena Trailer in 1991 and Medferry Express in 1993. Scrapped in Alang, India in 2009.
- MS Stena Trader (IV) (1987 - 1991) Built in 1979.
- MS Stena Topper (1988 - 1996 (Numerous Charters)) Built in 1983. Renamed Salar in 1989, Stena Topper in 1993, River Lune in 1993.
- MS Stena Big Sil (1988). Still serving in Food City today ?
- MS Scandinavian Saga (1988 - 1997) Built in 1974. Renamed Pride of San Diego 1991,Tropic Star II in 1992, and Stena Arcadia in 1994. Scrapped in Alang, India in 2010.
- MS Silvia Regina (1988 - 1991 (Chartered Out to Silja Line), 1991 - 2021, 2021 - 2025 (Chartered Out)) Built in 1981. Renamed Stena Britannica (III) in 1991, Stena Saga in 1994 and Saga in 2021. Was chartered out from Stena RoRo for use in the Philippines as an accommodation ship. Sold in 2025 to Bridgemans for use as a floatel.
- MS Stena Baltica (VI) (1988 - 1989 (Chartered Out)) Built in 1973. Never used in service with Stena Line. Renamed Nieborow in 1988. Scrapped in Aliaga, Turkey in 2017.
- MS Stena Project (1988 - 2008 (Numerous Charters)) Built in 1974. Renamed Monowar L in 1988, Stena Gothica (II) in 1990, and RoRo Gothica in 2004. Scrapped in Aliaga, Turkey in 2012.
- MS Nieborow (1988 - 1989, Chartered) Left in 1989.
- SS Princess Marguerite (1988 - 1991) Laid up in 1990 until sold in 1991. Scrapped in Alang, India in 1997.
- MS Stena Dan (1988 - 1991, Chartered) Built in 1988.
- MS Stena Progress (1988 - 1989) Built in 1978. Scrapped in Aliaga, Turkey in 2014.
- MS Stena Bey (1988). In dry dock ?
- MS Vancouver Island Princess (1988 - 1990, 1990 - 1993 (Numerous Charters)) Sold to the Chinese Government in 1993.
- MS Turella (1988 (Chartered Out), 1988 - 1997) Built in 1979. Renamed Stena Nordica (VI) in 1988 and Lion King in 1996.
- MS Koningin Beatrix (1989 - 2013, 2013 - 2017 (Chartered Out)) Renamed Stena Baltica (VII) in 2002. Sold to Grandi Navi Veloci.
- MS Stena Tender (1989 - 2004 (Numerous Charters)) Built in 1983. Renamed Tender in 1989, City of Port Melbourne in 1991 when on charter to Brambles Shipping, Melbourne, Stena Tender in 1999.
- MS Stena Timer (1989 - 2004 (Numerous Charters)) Built in 1984. Renamed Tasmania B in 1989 and City of Burnie in 1991 when on charter to Brambles Shipping, Melbourne, Stena Timer in 1999. Scrapped in Alang, India in 2014.
- MS Stena Transporter (IV) (1989 - 1993 (Numerous Charters)) Built in 1977. Extended by 39m in Gothenburg in 1989. Scrapped in Aliaga, Turkey in 2013.
- MS Stena Transfer (1989 - 1993 (Numerous Charters)) Built in 1978. Extended by 39m in Gothenburg in 1989. Scrapped in Aliaga, Turkey in 2013.
- MS Stena Prosper (1989) Built in 1980. Sold shortly after purchase. Scrapped in Aliaga, Turkey in 2013.
- MS G and C Admiral (1989 - 1993) Built in 1977. Sold to the US Navy.
- TS Stefan (1989 - 1992) Built in 1952. Sold in 1992.
- MS Svea Link (1989 - 2008, 2008 - 2009 (Chartered Out)) Built in 1973 as Svealand for Lion Ferry. Lengthened by 33.7m in 1982. Renamed Stena Seatrader (III) in 1990 and Seatrade in 2008. Scrapped in Alang, India in 2012.

=== 1990-1999 ===
- MS Empress (1990) Built in 1965. Planned to put her in service between Gothenburg and Copenhagen as Stena Empress. Sold in 1990.
- MS Stena Searider (1990 - 1991, 1991 - 1992 (Chartered Out), 1992, 1992 - 1995 (Chartered Out), 1995 - 2007) Built in 1969 as Finncarrier for Finnlines. Renamed Searider in 1991, Stena Searider in 1992 and 1995, and Norse Mersey in 1992.
- MS Cambridge Ferry (1990 - 1992) Sold in 1992, laid up. Scrapped in Aliaga, Turkey in 2003.
- MS Earl William (1990 - 1991, Chartered) Built in 1964.
- MS Stena Antrim (1990 - 1998) Built in 1981. Sold in 1998 to Limadet Ferry.
- MS Stena Caledonia (1990 - 2012) Built in 1981 as St David for Sealink. Had several charters to Isle of Man Steam Packet between 2007 - 2009. Sold to Indonesia Ferry in 2013.
- MS Stena Cambria (1990 - 1999) Sold in 1999 to UMAFISA, then Baleària in 2003 and Ventouris Ferries in 2010. Scrapped in Chittagong, Bangladesh in 2021.
- MS Stena Fantasia (1990 - 2002) Built in 1980. Renamed P&OSL Canterbury in 1998.
- MS Stena Felicity (1990 - 1997, Chartered) Built in 1980.
- MS Stena Galloway (1990 - 2002) Sold in 2002 to IMTC.
- MS Stena Hengist (1990 - 1992) Sold in 1992 to GA Ferries. Scrapped in Aliaga, Turkey in 2017.
- MS Stena Horsa (1990 - 1992) Sold in 1992 to Agoudimos Lines.
- MS Stena Hibernia (I) (1991 - 1997) Built in 1977. Renamed Stena Adventurer in 1996. Sold in 1997 to Agapitos Express Ferries. Scrapped in Gadani, Pakistan in 2021.
- MS Stena Challenger (1991 - 2001) Sold in 2001 to Marine Atlantic, renamed Leif Ericson.
- MS Stena Invicta (1991 - 1998, 1998 - 1999 (Chartered Out), 1999 - 2000, 2000 - 2002 (Chartered Out)). Built in 1985, ex Peder Paars. Chartered to Color Line in 2000 before being sold to them in 2002, renamed Color Viking.
- MS Stena Nautica (V) (1991 - 1992, 1992 - 1997 (Chartered Out), 1997 - 2026) Built in 1986. Chartered to B+I Line between 1992 and 1995 as Isle of Innisfree, then to Lion ferry until 1996 as Lion King. During 1996 and 1997 she done numerous charters between lay up periods. Rebuilt in 2002 with the lowest passenger deck being converted into a vehicle deck, doubling the lane metres but the passenger capacity was thirded. Sold to Eckero Link in 2026 and renamed to MV Eckero Link.
- MS Stena Traveller (II) (1991 - 2004, 2025, 2026 (Chartered)) Chartered Out to TT-Line 1992 - 1995 and 1997 - 2002 as TT-Traveller. Sold in 2004 to LISCO Baltic Service as Lisco Patria. Now owned by DFDS as Patria Seaways, chartered for refit relief in 2025 and 2026.
- MS Auersberg (1992, Chartered) Built in 1983. Scrapped in Alang, India in 2010.
- MS Stena Parisien (1992 - 1997 (Chartered), 2009 - 2012) Returned to SeaFrance in 1997. Bought by Stena Line in 2009 and renamed to Stena Navigator. Serves today as Poeta Lopez Anglada with Balearia.
- MS Vinzia E (1993 - 1994, Chartered) Built in 1972. For Stena SeaLink Line. Scrapped in Grenå, Denmark in 2011.
- HSC Stena Sea Lynx (1993 - 1999, Chartered) Renamed Stena Lynx in 1995.
- HSC Stena Sea Lynx II (1994 - 1998, Chartered) Renamed Stena Lynx II in 1996.
- MS Rosebay (1994 - 1997, 1998 - 2001, Chartered) Built in 1976. Scrapped in Alang, India in 2014.
- MS Stena Clipper (1994 - 2003 (Chartered Out)) Built in 1978. Chartered to Crowly Caribic in the Caribbean. Renamed Clipper in 2003 for scrapping in Alang, India.
- MS Stena Shipper (III) (1994 - 2008 (Numerous Charters)) Built in 1979. Renamed Volga Highway between 2005 and 2006, reverting afterwards. Scrapped in Alang, India in 2011.
- MS Norröna (1994, 1995, Chartered) Built in 1973.
- MS Marine Evangeline (1995 - 1996, Chartered) Built in 1974. Ex-Duke of Yorkshire. Scrapped in Aliaga, Turkey 2021.
- HSS Stena Explorer (1996 - 2015) Withdrawn in 2014. Sold to Karedeniz Holding and renamed One World Karedeniz. In 2023 she was converted to accommodate some 2000 victims of the Turkey and Syria earthquake.
- MS Stena Jutlandica (III) (1996 - ) Still serves today. Prior to entering service she was named Stena Jutlandica III.
- HSC Stena Lynx III (1996 - 2003 (Chartered), 2004 - 2011) Renamed Elite in 1998 and 2003, as P&OSL Elite in 1998 and reverting to Stena Lynx III in 1998 and 2004. Sold in 2011 for further service.
- HSC Condor 10 (1996, Chartered) Built in 1993.
- HSC Stena Pegasus (1996, Chartered) Finished charter in 1996, only to lay up until the next summer.
- HSS Stena Voyager (1996 - 2013) Laid up from 2011 until sold for scrap in 2013. Scrapped in Landskrona, Sweden, 2013.
- HSS Stena 900 (1996) Never operated, shipyard went bankrupt with 30% of the hull built which were taken apart and reused.
- HSS Stena Carisma (1997 - 2013) Laterly only operating in the summer. Laid up in Gothenburg.
- HSS Stena Discovery (1997 - 2009) Laid up from 2007 until sold in 2009. Scrapped in Aliaga, Turkey in 2015.
- MS Stena Royal (1998 - 2002) Renamed P&O SL Aquitaine in 1999, Pride of Aquitaine in 2003, Calais Seaways in 2013 and Isle of Innisfree in 2021.
- MS Stena Ausonia (1998 - (Chartered Out)) Stena 4-Runner Mk-I Class. Renamed Sea Centurian in 1998, Mont Ventoux in 2003, Stena Forwarder (II) in 2005, Ark Forwarder in 2007, Wilhelmsborg in 2015, Ark Forwarder in 2016, and MSC Bridge in 2018. Chartered to MSC starting in 2018.
- MS Stena Porter (1998 - 1999) Built in 1981. Rebuilt after purchase then chartered out. Renamed Tor Scandia in 1998. Scrapped in Chittagong, Bangladesh in 2014.
- MS Stena Partner (1998) Built in 1981. Sold shortly after purchase. Scrapped in Alang, India in 2014.
- MS Southern Carrier (1999, Chartered) Built in 1979. Scrapped in Alang, India in 2011.
- MS Greifswald (1999, Chartered) Built in 1988.
- MS Aurora af Helsingborg (1999 - 2015) Built in 1992.
- MS Götaland (1999 - 2010) Built in 1973. Sold to VG Trans Terminal Co Ltd in 2010.
- MS Skåne (1999 - ) Built in 1998. Still serves today.
- MS Trelleborg (1999 - 2016) Built in 1981. Sold to MH Marine Co, Marshall Islands in 2016.
- MS Finnclipper (1999, 2017 (Chartered)) Stena Seapacer Class. Build agreement between Stena RoRo and Finnlines, where Stena RoRo builds 4 vessels and 2 are sold to Finnlines after delivery. The other 2 were kept by Stena Line.
- MS Finneagle (1999) Stena Seapacer Class, see Finnclipper.

=== 2000-2009 ===
- MS Stena Britannica (IV) (2000 - 2003) Stena Seapacer Class, see Finnclipper. Sold to Finnlines in 2003 and renamed Finnfellow.
- MS Svealand (2001 - 2003 (Chartered), 2005 - 2006) Built in 1999. Finished charter in 2003, then was bought in 2005 before being sold to DFDS Tor Line in 2006 as Lisco Optima then Optima Seaways.
- MS Stena Hollandica (I) (2001 - ) Stena Seapacer Class, see Finnclipper. Moved to Baltic, renamed Stena Germanica (IV) in 2010, and lengthened by 52m.
- MS Stena Forwarder (I) (2001 - 2003, Chartered) For the Dublin - Holyhead route. Sold to Baja Ferries in 2007.
- MV Norse Mersey (2001, Chartered) Built in 1995.
- MV Antares (2002 - 2003, Chartered) Built in 1988.
- MV Stena Foreteller (2002 - (Numerous Charters)) Stena 4-Runner Mk-II Class. Rebuilt in 2025 with an extra trailer deck, increasing lane metres by 30%.
- MV Stena Forerunner (2003 - (Numerous Charters)) Stena 4-Runner Mk-II Class. Rebuilt in 2025 with an extra trailer deck, increasing lane metres by 30%.
- MV Stena Forecaster (2003 - (Numerous Charters)) Stena 4-Runner Mk-II Class. Currently on charter to CMA CGM.
- MS Stena Britannica (V) (2003 - ) Stena Seamaster Class. Still serves today. Renamed Stena Scandinavica (V) in 2011, when lengthened by 30m.
- MS Stena Adventurer (2003 - ) Stena Seamaster Class. Still serves today.
- MS Pride of Aquitaine (2003 - 2005 (Chartered Out)) Laid up in 2005, renamed MS Norman Spirit in 2005. Sold to LD Lines in 2005.
- MS Oihonna (2003, 2003 - 2006 (Chartered to Charter Out)) Built in 1984. Chartered from Imperial RoRo to charter to Finnlines. Renamed Vasaland in 2003.
- MS Bore-Mari (2004, Chartered) Built in 1991.
- MS European Envoy (2004 (Chartered Out)) Built in 1979. Sold shortly after purchase, renamed Envoy in 2004.
- HSC Elite (2004) Laid up ?
- MS Stena Nordica (VII) (2004 - 2015, 2015 - 2016 (Chartered Out), 2016 - ) Built 2000, ex European Ambassador. Chartered to DFDS seaways between 2015 and 2016 as Malo Seaways.
- MS Stena Carrier II (III) (2004 - 2018) Stena 4-Runner Mk-I Class. Named Aronte prior to launch and renamed once towed elsewhere for completion. Renamed Stena Carrier in 2004. Sold to Baja Ferries, renamed Mexico Star.
- MS Stena Seafreighter (2004 - 2018) Stena 4-Runner Mk-I Class. Named Stena Hispanica prior to launch and renamed once towed elsewhere for completion. Renamed Stena Freighter (II) in 2004. Sold to Blue Origin in 2018 to serve as a rocket booster landing platform. Scrapped in USA in 2022.
- Stena Challenger (II) (2005, Chartered) Built in 1995. ex Pride of Cherbourg (III), Isle of Innisfree, renamed Challenger in 2005, Kaitaki in 2007.
- MV Lindarosa (2005 - 2021 (Chartered Out)) Built in 1996. Renamed Mont Ventoux in 2005. Sold to CMA CGM in 2021.
- MV Sea Runner (2006, Chartered) Built in 1978. Scrapped in India in 2010.
- MV Stena Trader (V) (2006 - 2009, 2009 - 2015 (Chartered Out)) Stena Seabridger Mk-I Class. Chartered to Marine Atlantic as Blue Puttees from 2009 - 2015. Sold to Marine Atlantic in 2015.
- MV Borja (2007 - 2022 (Chartered Out)) Intended name was Stena Ausonia but chartered out on delivery from shipyard. Renamed Baltic Amber in 2010, Norman Asturias in 2011, Asterion in 2016, and Connemara in 2018 when on charter to Brittany Ferries.
- MV Amanda (2007, Chartered) Built in 1978. Scrapped in Alang, India in 2010.
- MV Finnarrow (2007 - 2011, 2013, Chartered) Built in 1996.
- MV Stena Traveller (III) (2007 - 2009, 2009 - 2015 (Chartered Out)) Stena Seabridger Mk-I Class. Chartered to Marine Atlantic as Highlanders from 2009 - 2015. Sold to Marine Atlantic in 2015.

=== 2010-2019 ===
- MV Stena Britannica (VI) (2010 - ) Stena Superferry Class.
- MV Stena Hollandica (II) (2010 - ) Stena Superferry Class.
- MV Coraggio (2010 - 2011, Chartered) Built in 2007.
- MV Lagan Seaways (2010 - 2012 (Chartered), 2012 - ) Built in 2005. Renamed Stena Lagan in 2011. Rebuilt and lengthened by 35.4m in 2021 for Baltic routes and renamed Stena Scandica.
- MV Mersey Seaways (2010 - 2012 (Chartered), 2012 - ) Built in 2005. Renamed Stena Mersey in 2011. Rebuilt and lengthened by 35.4m in 2021 for Baltic routes and renamed Stena Baltica (IX).
- MV Scotia Seaways (2010 - 2011 (Chartered), 2011 - )) Built in 1996, ex Maersk Exporter. Renamed Stena Scotia in 2011.
- MV Hibernia Seaways (2010 - 2011 (Chartered), 2011 - ) Built in 1996, ex Maersk Importer. Renamed Stena Hibernia (II) in 2011.
- MV Stena Transit (2011 - ) Stena Seabridger Mk-II Class.
- MV Stena Transporter (VI) (2011 - ) Stena Seabridger Mk-II Class.
- MV Stena Superfast VII (2011 - 2017 (Chartered), 2017 - ) Built in 2001, bought by Stena in 2017.
- MV Stena Superfast VIII (2011 - 2017 (Chartered), 2017 - ) Built in 2001, bought by Stena in 2017.
- Norman Trader (2011 (Chartered), 2013, 2013 - 2019 (Chartered Out)) Built in 1998, renamed Stena Alegra when bought in 2013. Chartered to Interislander in 2013, sold to KiwiRail in 2019.
- Stena Feronia (2011 - 2015) Built in 1997. Many different charters to DFDS Seaways, FRS Iberia, and Intershipping between relief periods for Stena Line's fleet. Sold to Bluebridge, New Zealand in 2015.
- MV Capucine (2012 - 2017) Built in 2011.
- MV Severine (2012 - 2017) Built in 2012.
- MV Urd (2012 - 2013 (Chartered), 2013 - 2023, 2023 - 2024 (Chartered Out)) Built in 1981. Bought by Stena Line in 2013. Sold in 2024 to Sea Lines.
- MV Norman Voyager (2012 - 2021 (Chartered Out), 2021 - 2025) Built in 2008, bought by Stena RoRo in 2012 for charters to DFDS Seaways and Brittany Ferries. Renamed Etretat in 2014 and Stena Livia in 2021. Sold to Strait NZ in March 2025, renamed MV Livia.
- MV Scottish Viking (2012 - 2021, Chartered) Built in 2008, renamed GNV Sealand in 2021.
- MV Watling Street (2012 - ) Built in 2008. Renamed Stena Flavia in 2013.
- MV Stena Performer (2012 - 2018, Chartered) Built in 2012. Long-term charter from Seatruck Ferries, reverted to Seatruck Performance in 2018.
- MV Stena Precision (2012 - 2018, Chartered) Built in 2012. Long-term charter from Seatruck Ferries, reverted to Seatruck Precision in 2018.
- MV Clipper Pennant (2012, 2013, 2014, Chartered) Built in 2009.
- MV Mecklenburg-Vorpommern (2012 - ) Built in 1996. Stena Line took over the charter from Scandlines in 2012.
- MV Sassnitz (2012 - 2021) Built in 1989. Sold for scrap and beached in Aliaga, Turkey.
- MV Stena Baltica (VIII) (2013 - 2020, Chartered) Built in 2007, chartered from Brittany Ferries, with which she served as Cotentin.
- MV Lazio (2013, Chartered) Built in 1994. For Stena SeaLine services.
- MV Stena Horizon (2014 - , Chartered) Built in 2006, ex Cartour Beta and Celtic Horizon.
- MV Dieppe Seaways (2014 - 2015 (Chartered Out), 2015 - 2020, 2020 - (Chartered Out)) Built in 2002. Renamed Stena Superfast X in 2015. Chartered out to Corsica Linea, renamed A Nepita.
- MV Stena Egeria (2014 - (Chartered Out)) Built in 2001. Renamed Af Michela in 2017, and Kerry in 2019. Currently on charter to Baleària.
- MV Lasse Maja III (2015, Chartered) Built in 1984. For a sailing competition, ran between Koön - Martstrandsön as Stena Marstrandica, from 29 June to 4 July 2015.
- MV Partenope (2015 - 2017 (Chartered Out)) Built in 2002. Renamed Napoles in 2015 when chartered to Balearia. Sold to Kanalion Maritime Co Ltd in 2017, continuing the charter.
- MV Trinacria (2015 - 2017 (Chartered Out)) Built in 2002. Renamed Sicilia in 2015 when chartered to Balearia. Sold to Kanalion Maritime Co Ltd in 2017, continuing the charter.
- MV Miranda (2015 - 2017, Chartered) Built in 1999.
- MV Misida (2015 - 2017, 2018 - 2020, Chartered) Built in 2007.
- MV Misana (2015 - 2017, 2018 - 2020, Chartered) Built in 2007.
- MV Caroline Russ (2016 - 2018, Chartered) Built in 1999.
- MV Elisabeth Russ (2017 - 2018, Chartered) Built in 1999.
- MV Gute (2016 - 2017, 2017, 2017 - 2018, Chartered) Built in 1979.
- MV Hammerodde (2017 - 2018 (Chartered Out), 2018 - 2023, 2023 (Chartered Out), 2023 - 2025, 2025 - 2026 (Chartered Out)) Built in 2005. Bought in 2017 and chartered back to Danske Faerger for almost a year. Renamed Stena Vinga in 2018. Chartered to Intershipping in 2023, then DFDS Seaways from 2025 to 2026. Acquired by DFDS in 2026.
- MV Mistral (2018, 2026, Chartered) Built in 1998.
- MV Vikingland (2018 - 2019, Chartered) Built in 1982.
- MV Somerset (2018 - 2021, 2023, Chartered, 2026 - ) Built in 2000. Bought in October 2026 for the Dublin - Birkenhead route, to be renamed MV Stena Freighter.
- MV Bore Bay (2018 - 2019, Chartered) Built in 1997.
- MV Clipper Ranger (2018, Chartered) Built in 1998.
- MV Stena Estrid (2019 - ) Entered service January 2020. Stena E-Flexer 1.
- MV Stena Edda (2019 - ) Entered service March 2020. Stena E-Flexer 2.

=== 2020-2029 ===
- MV Galicia (2020 - (Chartered Out)) Entered service December 2020. Stena E-Flexer 3, long-term chartered to Brittany Ferries.
- MV Stena Nova (2020 - 2021) Built in 2003. Bought by Stena RoRo in February 2019, Never entered service and bought by 2GO Travel in 2021.
- MV Seatruck Panorama (2020 - 2021, 2021 - 2023, Chartered)
- MV Stena Embla (2020 - ) Entered service January 2021. Stena E-Flexer 4.
- MV Hatche (2020 - 2022, Chartered) Built in 2009. Renamed MV Pol Stella in 2021.
- MV Qezban (2020 - 2022, Chartered) Built in 2010. Renamed MV Pol Maris in 2020.
- MV Côte D'Opale (2021 - (Chartered Out)) Entered service August 2021. Stena E-Flexer 5, long-term chartered to DFDS Seaways.
- MV Salamanca (2021 - (Chartered Out)) Entered service March 2022. Stena E-Flexer 6, long-term chartered to Brittany Ferries.
- MV Stena Estelle (2022 - ) Entered service September 2022. Stena E-Flexer 7.
- MV Stena Ebba (2022 - ) Entered service January 2023. Stena E-Flexer 8.
- MV Santoña (2022 - (Chartered Out)) Entered service March 2023. Stena E-Flexer 9, long-term chartered to Brittany Ferries.
- MV Midas (2022, Chartered) Built in 1990.
- MV Jutlandia Sea (2022 - 2026, Chartered) Built in 2010.
- MV Fionia Sea (2022 - 2026, Chartered) Built in 2009.
- MV Stena Forwarder (III) (2023 - ) Built in 2016. Bought in October 2023.
- MV Bore Song (2024 - 2026, Chartered) Built in 2011. Charter from April 2024 to January 2026 for Dublin - Liverpool route.
- MV Ala'Suinu (2024 - (Chartered Out)) Delivered February 2024, entered service summer 2024. Stena E-Flexer 10, long-term chartered to Marine Atlantic.
- MV Ben My Chree (2024 - 2025, 2025 - 2026, Chartered) Built in 1998. Chartered from Isle of Man Steam packet during Holyhead port Closure and 2025 to May 2026 dry dock seasons.
- MV Saint-Malo (2024 - (Chartered Out)) Delivered October 2024. Stena E-Flexer 11, long-term chartered to Brittany Ferries.
- MV Guillame De Normandie (2025 - (Chartered Out)) Delivered December 2024. Stena E-Flexer 12, long-term chartered to Brittany Ferries.
- MV Thuleland (2025 - 2026, Chartered) Built in 2006.
- MV Stena Shipper (IV) (2025 - ) Built in 2012.
- MV Stena Futura (2025 - ) Stena NewMax Class 1. Ordered 10 May 2023 for Belfast - Heysham route. Entered service 22 September 2025.
- MV Stena Connecta (2026 - ) Stena NewMax Class 2. Ordered 10 May 2023 for Belfast - Heysham route. Entered service 23 January 2026.
- MV Aurora Botnia (2026 - ) Built in 2021. Stena Line bought Wasaline and her in 2026, but still operates under the brand Wasaline.

=== Under Construction ===
- MV Capu Rossu (2026 - ) Stena E-Flexer 13, long-term chartered to Corsica Linea.
- MV Stena E-Flexer 14 (2027 - ) Stena E-Flexer 14, long-term chartered to Attica Group.
- MV Stena E-Flexer 15 (2027 - ) Stena E-Flexer 15, long-term chartered to Attica Group.
- MV Stena E-Flexer 16 (2030 - ) Stena E-Flexer 16, ordered September 2026 for Gothenburg - Frederikshavn route.
- MV Stena E-Flexer 17 (2030 - ) Stena E-Flexer 17, ordered September 2026 for Gothenburg - Frederikshavn route.

== Alphabetical ==
- Stena Adventurer (built 1977) - Scrapped in 2021.
- Stena Adventurer (built 2003)
- Stena Antrim (built 1981) - Now Ibn Batouta with Limadet Ferry.
- Stena Atlantica (I) (built 1966) - Sold in 1973 to Finnlines. Scrapped in 2003 after burnout.
- Stena Atlantica (II) (built 1975) - Did not serve under this name, renamed Stena Nautica (II) for her launch. Chartered to CN Marine and renamed Marine Atlantica. Scrapped as Sardinia Vera in 2024.
- Stena Ausonia (built 1998) - Now the Ark Forwarder with DFDS Tor Line
- Stena Baltica (I) (built 1966) - Sold in 1970 to Caledonian Steam Packet Co, renamed Caledonia. Scrapped in 2006.
- Stena Baltica (II) (built 1966) - Served as an accommodation ship. Scrapped in 2004.
- Stena Baltica (III) (built 1973) - Later as Rigel I with Ventouris Ferries, scrapped. Scrapped in 2021.
- Stena Baltica (IV) (built 1971)
- Stena Baltica (V) (built 1985) - Never completed due to shipyard troubles. Scrapped in 2012.
- Stena Baltica (VI) (built 1973) - Later as Sveti Stefan II with Montenegro Lines. Scrapped in 2017.
- Stena Baltica (VII) (built 1986) - Bought in 1989. Renamed from Koningin Beatrix in 2002. Later SNAV Adriatico with SNAV, now GNV Blu.
- Stena Baltica (VIII) (built 2007) - Charter from Brittany Ferries, named as Cotentin prior to 2013 and after returning in 2020.
- Stena Baltica (IX) (built 2005) - Renamed from Stena Mersey after rebuild in 2021.
- Stena Britannica (I) (built 1967) - Scrapped in 2001.
- Stena Britannica (II) (built 1978) - Renamed from Stena Project in 1983, Stena Hispania in 1986. Used as Finnforest with Finnlines from 1996 until scrapped in 2011.
- Stena Britannica (III) (built 1981) - Renamed from Silvia Regina in 1991, and to Stena Saga in 1994 and Saga in 2021.
- Stena Britannica (IV) (built 2000) - Now Finnfellow with Finnlines.
- Stena Britannica (V) (built 2003) - Renamed Stena Scandinavica (V) in 2011.
- Stena Britannica (VI) (built 2010)
- Stena Caledonia (built 1981) - Now Port Link with ASDP Indonesia Ferry.
- Stena Cambria (built 1980) - Now Bari with Ventouris Ferries.
- Stena Carisma (built 1997)
- Stena Carrier (I) (built 1970) - Scrapped in 2011.
- Stena Carrier (II) (built 1978) - Renamed from Imparca Express I in 1980. Scrapped in 2012.
- Stena Carrier (III) (built 2004) - Named Aronte prior to completion, and Stena Carrier II for first few months of service.
- Stena Carrier II (built 2004) - Named Aronte prior to completion. Renamed Stena Carrier in 2004 after first few months of service.
- Stena Challenger (built 1991) - Sold to Marine Atlantic in 2001.
- Stena Challenger (II) (built 1995) - Sold to Interislander.
- Stena Danica (I) (built 1965)
- Stena Danica (II) (built 1969) - Wrecked in 2006.
- Stena Danica (III) (built 1974) - Renamed from Stena Nordica (II) before entering service, and returning to it in 1981, Stena Nautica (IV) in 1984, Stena Londoner in 1992. Scrapped in 2005.
- Stena Danica (IV) (built 1983)
- Stena Discovery (built 1997) - Later the HSS Discovery. Scrapped in 2015.
- Stena Driver (built 1982) - Later the Ask with Scandlines. Now named Gothica.
- Stena Ebba (built 2022)
- Stena Edda (built 2019)
- Stena Embla (built 2020)
- Stena Empereur (built 1983) now the Pride of Telemark with Kystlink.
- Stena Estelle (built 2022)
- Stena Estrid (built 2019)
- Stena Europe (built 1981)
- Stena Explorer (built 1995)
- Stena Fantasia (built 1980)
- Stena Finlandica (built 1963) - now the Galapagos Legend with Galatours
- Stena Felicity (built 1980)
- Stena Forecaster (built 2003)
- Stena Forerunner (built 2003)
- Stena Foreteller (built 2002)
- Stena Forwarder (I) (built 2001)
- Stena Forwarder (II) (built 1998) - now MSC Bridge, under charter to MSC
- Stena Forwarder (III) (built 2016) - Bought in October 2023.
- Stena Freighter (I) (built 1977) - Sold in 2004, renamed Global Freighter. Scrapped in 2011.
- Stena Freighter (II) (built 2004) - Named Stena Hispanica prior to launch and renamed to Stena SeaFreighter once towed elsewhere to be completed. Used as a Roll-on/Roll-off ship until 2018; refitted out 2018–2019 to become a landing platform ship for landing Blue Origin New Glenn to launch vehicle booster stages on.
- Stena Galloway (built 1980) - Now Morocco Sun with Africa Morocco Link.
- Stena Germanica (I) (built 1967) - Sold in 1979. Wrecked then scrapped in 2006.
- Stena Germanica (II) (built 1987) - Renamed Stena Scandinavica (IV) in 1986 and Stena Spirit in 2011.
- Stena Germanica (III) (built 1987) - Renamed from Stena Scandinavica (III) in 1986 and renamed Stena Vision in 2010.
- Stena Germanica (IV) (built 2001) - Renamed from Stena Hollandica when lengthened in 2010.
- Stena Gothica (I) (built 1978) - Sank in Baltic Sea, 1 November 2006.
- Stena Gothica (II) (built 1974) - Bought in 1988, scrapped in 2012.
- Stena Gothica (III) (built 1981) - Bought in 1984, sold 1985, bought again in 2012, when got the name. Sold in 2024 as Gothica.
- Stena Grecia (built 1978) - Now Atlantic Freighter with Marine Atlantic.
- Stena Hengist (built 1972)
- Stena Hibernia (I) (built 1977) - Renamed Stena Adventurer in 1996. Later Masarrah with Namma Lines. Scrapped in 2021.
- Stena Hibernia (II) (built 1996) - Bought from DFDS Seaways in 2011.
- Stena Hispania (built 1978) - Now Finnforest with Finnlines.
- Stena Hollandica (I) (built 2001) - Renamed Stena Germanica when lengthened in 2010.
- Stena Hollandica (II) (built 2010)
- Stena Horizon (built 2006)
- Stena Horsa (built 1972)
- Stena Invicta (built 1985) - Now Color Viking with Color Line.
- Stena Ionia (built 1978) - Sank in Baltic Sea, 1 November 2006.
- Stena Jutlandica (I) (built 1973) - Renamed Jutlandica in 1982 and Bluenose in 1983. Sold to CN Marine in 1983. Scrapped in 2010.
- Stena Jutlandica (II) (built 1983) - Renamed Stena Empereur in 1996 and P&OSL Provence in 1998. Later Pride of Telemark with Kystlink, scrapped in 2011.
- Stena Jutlandica (III) (built 1996) - Named Stena Jutlandica III prior to entering service.
- Stena Jutlandica III (built 1996) - Renamed Stena Jutlandica prior to entering service.
- Stena Leader (built 1975) - Launched as Stena Traveller (I)
- Stena Londoner (built 1974)
- Stena Lynx (built 1993)
- Stena Lynx II (built 1994)
- Stena Lynx III (built 1996)
- Stena Mariner (built 1976)
- Stena Nautica (I) (built 1974) - Did not serve under this name. Chartered to CN Marine, renamed Marine Nautica. Still in service with Corsica Ferries.
- Stena Nautica (II) (built 1974) - Named Stena Atlantica (II) prior to her launch. Chartered to CN Marine and renamed Marine Atlantica. Still in service with Corsica Ferries.
- Stena Nautica (III) (built 1975) - Ex Stena Nordica (III) Renamed Greece in 1978 - 79, 1980 and 1981 - 82 when on charter to Hellas Ferries, renamed to Stena Nautica (III) in 1982. Sold in 1983. Scrapped in 2015.
- Stena Nautica (IV) (built 1974) - Ex Stena Nordica (II) Renamed Stena Danica (III) in 1974 before entering service, reverted to Stena Nordica (II) in 1981, renamed Stena Nautica (IV) in 1984, Versailles in 1987, and Stena Londoner in 1992.
- Stena Nautica (V) (built 1986) - Chartered to B+I Line between 1992 and 1995 as Isle of Innisfree, then to Lion ferry until 1996 as Lion King.
- Stena Navigator (built 1984) now Poeta Lòpez Anglada with Baleària
- Stena Nordic (built 1969)
- Stena Nordica (I) (built 1965)
- Stena Nordica (II) (built 1974) - Renamed Stena Danica (III) in 1974 before entering service, Stena Nordica (II) in 1981, Stena Nautica (IV) in 1984, Versailles in 1987, and Stena Londoner in 1992.
- Stena Nordica (III) (built 1975) - Renamed Greece in 1978 - 79, 1980 and 1981 - 82 when on charter to Hellas Ferries, Stena Nautica (III) in 1982.
- Stena Nordica (IV) (built 1969) - Renamed from Prinsessan Christina in 1983, and to Europafärjan I in 1985, Lion Prince in 1985, and Stena Prince in 1998.
- Stena Nordica (V) (built 1973)
- Stena Nordica (VI) (built 1979) - Renamed from Turella in 1988 and renamed Lion King in 1996. Now Rigel III with Ventouris Ferries.
- Stena Nordica (VII) (built 2000) - Renamed from European Ambassador in 2004 and named Malo Seaways between 2015 and 2016.
- Stena Normandica (built 1974) now Moby Vincent with Moby Lines
- Stena Normandy (built 1982) - Now Normandy with Irish Ferries.
- Stena Olympica (built 1972)
- Stena Parisien (built 1984) - now Poeta Lòpez Anglada with Baleària
- Stena Partner (built 1978)
- Stena Partner (built 1981) - now Eurocargo Africa with Grimaldi Ferries.
- Stena Pegasus (built 1996) - now Speedrunner II with Aegean Speed Lines.
- Stena Pioneer (built 1975)
- Stena Polonica (built 1988)
- Stena Porter (built 1981)
- Stena Prince (built 1969)
- Stena Progress (built 1978)
- Stena Progress (built 2009)
- Stena Project (built 1975)
- Stena Project (built 1978) - Now Finnforest with Finnlines.
- Stena Prosper (built 1978) - Sank in Baltic Sea, 1 November 2006.
- Stena Royal (built 1991) - now Ostend Spirit with LD Lines.
- Stena Runner (built 1977) - Later Stena Transfer (I).
- Stena Saga (built 1980)
- Stena Saga (built 1981) now the Stena Europe.
- Stena Sailer (built 1974) - Now Theseus
- Stena Scandinavica (I) (built 1973) - Renamed Saint Killian in 1978. Later Egnatia III. Scrapped in 2007.
- Stena Scandinavica (II) (built 1974) - Renamed from Prinsessan Birgitta in 1982, and renamed Scandinavica in 1987 and Terek L in 1989. Later Cesme with Marmara Lines. Scrapped in 2022.
- Stena Scandinavica (III) (built 1987) - Renamed Stena Germanica (III) prior to completion work in 1986 and Stena Vision in 2010.
- Stena Scandinavica (IV) (built 1987) - Renamed from Stena Germanica (II) prior to completion work in 1986 and Stena Spirit in 2011.
- Stena Scandinavica (V) (built 2002) - Renamed from Stena Britannica (V) in 2011.
- Stena Scanrail (built 1973)
- Stena Scotia (built 1996)
- Stena Sea Lynx (built 1993)
- Stena Sea Lynx II (built 1994)
- Stena Seafarer (built 1975)
- Stena Seafreighter (built 2004)
- Stena Searider (built 1969)
- Stena Searider (built 1973) - Later Stena Scanrail.
- Stena Seatrader (I) (built 1973) - Later Stena Scanrail. Scrapped in 2021.
- Stena Seatrader (II) (built 1973) - Scrapped in 2011.
- Stena Seatrader (III) (built 1973) - Later Seatrade with Ventouris Ferries. Scrapped in 2012.
- Stena Shipper (I) (built 1973) - Scrapped in 2013.
- Stena Shipper (II) (built 1977) - Scrapped in 2010.
- Stena Shipper (III) (built 1979) - Bought in 1979, scrapped in 2011.
- Stena Shipper (IV) (built 2012) - Bought in 2025.
- Stena Tender (built 1983)
- Stena Timer (built 1984)
- Stena Topper (built 1979)
- Stena Trader (I) (built 1975) - Renamed Union Melbourne for delivery.
- Stena Trader (II) (built 1978) - Renamed Stena Transporter in 1978 upon delivery and Baltic Ferry in 1980.
- Stena Trader (III) (built 1971) - Launched as Stena Trailer, renamed Dalriada in 1972, Viking Trader in 1980, Stena Trader in 1981 - 1985.
- Stena Trader (IV) (built 1979) - Stena owned 1987 - 1991.
- Stena Trader (V) (built 2006) - Now Blue Puttees with Marine Atlantic.
- Stena Trailer (built 1971) - Renamed Dalriada in 1972, Viking Trader in 1980, Stena Trader (III) in 1981.
- Stena Transit (built 2011)
- Stena Transfer (I) (built 1977) - Built as Stena Runner, sold 1994, bought again in 2002, sold in 2010. Scrapped in 2012.
- Stena Transfer (II) (built 1989) - Scrapped in 2013.
- Stena Transporter (I) (built 1973) - Named Jarl Transporter 1973 - 1975. Sold in 1975.
- Stena Transporter (II) (built 1978) - Named Stena Transporter 1978 - 1980. Later Diplomat with Marine Express. Scrapper in 2011.
- Stena Transporter (III) (built 1978) - Renamed from Alpha Enterprise in 1983, renamed Cerdic Ferry in 1985, Stena Partner in 2003.
- Stena Transporter (IV) (built 1977) - Bought 1989, sold 1993. Scrapped in 2013.
- Stena Transporter (V) (built 1978) - Named Stena Transporter 2002 - 2009. Later Strada Corsa. Scrapped in 2017.
- Stena Transporter (VI) (built 2011)
- Stena Traveller (I) (built 1975) - Renamed Buffalo for delivery to P&O Ferries who bought her off the blocks. Stena owned her again 2004 - 2011 as Stena Leader.
- Stena Traveller (II) (built 1992) - Sold in 2004. Now Patria Seaways with DFDS. Chartered for dry dock cover in 2025.
- Stena Traveller (III) (built 2007) - Now Highlanders with Marine Atlantic.
- Stena Voyager (built 1996)
