= Stena Freighter =

Stena Freighter may refer to:

- Stena Freighter (1977)
- Stena Freighter (2004)
