= MV Finnbirch =

Ship built in 1978

Coordinates: 56°45′03″N 17°15′06″E

History
- Name: Finnbirch (1996–2006); Bore Gothica (1988–1996); Stena Gothica (1985–1988); Stena Ionia (1982–1985); Merzario Ionia (1981–1982); Atlantic Prosper (1978–1984); Stena Prosper (1978)
- Operator: Finnlines (2002–2006); Finncarriers (1992–2002); Bore RoRo (1991–1992); British Ministry of Defence (1991); Bore RoRo (1988–1991); Stena Line (1985–1988); North Sea Ferries (1985); OT West Africa Line (1982–1985); Andreo Merzario (1981–1982); Atlantic Container Line (1978–1981)
- Port of registry: Stockholm Sweden
- Builder: Hyundai Heavy Industries
- Yard number: 646
- Launched: 1978
- Acquired: 2 February 1978
- Identification: Call sign: SLNK; IMO number: 7528609
- Fate: Sunk in the Baltic Sea; 1 November 2006

General characteristics
- Length: 155.99 m (511 ft 9 in)
- Beam: 22.71 m (74 ft 6 in)
- Draft: 7.32 m (24 ft 0 in)
- Speed: 17 knots (31 km/h; 20 mph)
- Crew: 14

MV Finnbirch was a Swedish roll-on/roll-off (ro-ro) ship built in 1978 as Stena Prosper.

== History ==
Finnbirch was built at Hyundai Heavy Industries in South Korea and delivered to her owners Stena RoRo on 2 February 1978. In 1988 the ship was sold to Finnish Rettig, and in 1995 to Bore Line. In 1999, Strömma Turism & Sjöfart in Stockholm acquired the ship and kept it until it foundered. Lindholm Shipping, Strömma Turism & Sjöfart AB was the last owner of Finnbirch and her sister ship Finnforest. Both vessels were in timecharter for the Finnish company Finnlines Plc at the time of the sinking.

== Sinking ==
On 1 November 2006, the ship sank on the east coast of Sweden. At the time of the sinking, Finnbirch had a crew of 14, of four Swedes and ten Filipinos. The ship capsized in a heavy storm which also set an oil rig adrift. The crew were seen sitting on the ship's hull, but the storm prevented rescue boats from reaching the scene and it was too dangerous to lower the helicopter crew onto the violently pitching hull. All but two of the men were eventually rescued after jumping into the sea once the ship had capsized. One of the Filipino crew members died in the hospital after his rescue suit failed and a Swede drowned after being entangled in the wreck. The master of the ship broke several bones after falling, but survived. On 7 November 2006, the Merchant Marine Officers' Association criticized the rescue, stating that the helicopter had been circling overhead whilst the crew members sat on the hull waiting to be rescued.

If one is going to save lives it is probably best to do so while they are still on board rather than when they are in the water.

— Christer Themnér, CEO of Merchant Marine Officers' Association

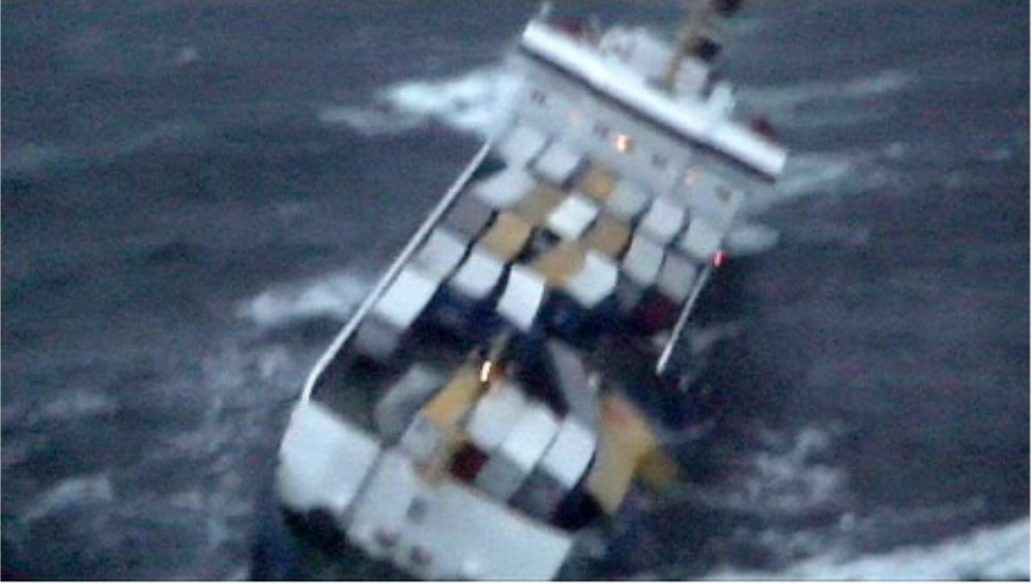
MV Finnbirch during its sinking

== Sister Ships ==
The Finnbirch has 10 sister ships, these are;

- Global Freighter
- Doric Ferry
- Stena Shipper
- Elk
- Baltic Ferry
- Atlantic Freighter
- Stena Project
- Cerdic Ferry
- Global Carrier
- Nordic Ferry

== See also ==
- ISSN 1400-5735 Report RS 2008:03e Loss of M/S FINNBIRCH between Öland and Gotland, 1 november 2006 Case S-130/06." Swedish Accident Investigation Board. (Archive)
- Investigation by the Swedish Accident Investigation Board (Archive) (in Swedish)
- DN Nyheter: Sju räddade från kapsejsat fartyg (in Swedish)
- Fartygets historia (in Swedish)
