= Nordica =

Nordica may refer to:

== Companies ==
- Nordica (airline), a defunct Estonian airline
- Nordica (company), a manufacturer of skis, ski boots, and accessories for skiing

== People ==
- Lillian Nordica, an American operatic soprano

== Ships and boats ==
- Finnish icebreaker Nordica (1994)
- MS Stena Nordica, the name of various Stena Line ships, including:
  - MS Stena Nordica (2004), built in 2000 as the MS European Ambassador
  - MS Regina Pacis, built 1979, named Stena Nordica from 1988 to 1996
- Nordica 16, a sailboat design from 1820
- SS Lillian Nordica, a Liberty ship launched 1944, scrapped 1965, named after the soprano
