= MS Baltic Ferry =

Ship built in 1978

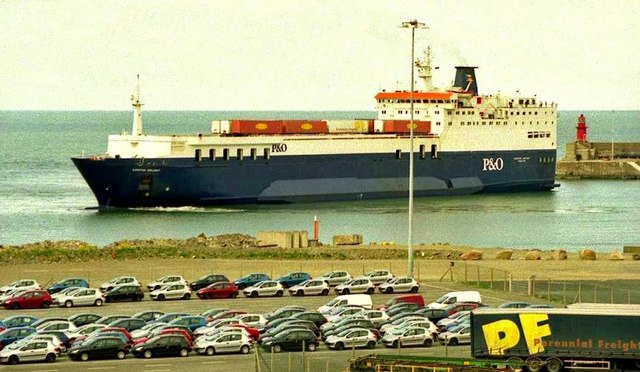
- European Diplomat arriving at Rosslare

History
- Name: Pavilion (2011); Diplomat (2005-2011); European Diplomat (2001-2005); Pride of Suffolk (1992-2001); Baltic Ferry (1980-1992); Stena Transporter (1980); Finnrose (1979-1980); Stena Transporter (1978-1979)
- Owner: Argo Systems (2011); Celtic Link Ferries (2005-2011); P&O European Ferries (1994-2005); Stena Rederi (1978-1994)
- Operator: Marine Express (2010-2011); Celtic Link Ferries (2005-2010); P&O Irish Sea (2001-2005); P&O North Sea Ferries (1992-2001); P&O European Ferries (1987-1992); Townsend Thoresen (1983-1987); Ministry of Defence (UK) (1982-1983); Townsend Thoresen (1980-1982); Stena Line (1980); Finnlines (1979-1980); Stena Line (1978-1999)
- Port of registry: Hamilton, Bermuda
- Builder: Hyundai H.I., Ulsan, South Korea
- Yard number: 652
- Launched: 5 July 1978
- Identification: IMO number: 7528661
- Fate: Scrapped 2011

General characteristics
- Tonnage: 18,732 GT
- Length: 151.01 m
- Beam: 21.67 m
- Draught: 7.32 m
- Propulsion: Pielstick
- Speed: 18 knots

MS Baltic Ferry was built in 1978 by South Korean-based Hyundai H.I. for Stena Lines who had intended her, and 10 sister ships to be used for charter or sale to other operators. She was chartered by Townsend Thoresen in 1980, staying with them and their successor P&O Ferries and P&O Irish Sea until 2005. In 1982 the Ministry of Defence requisitioned the vessel to transport troops to the Falkland Islands.

In July 2011 the ship was renamed Pavilion for her final journey to India for breaking.

== Falklands War ==
In 1982, three vessels operated by European Ferries were requisitioned by the Ministry of Defence to assist with the Falklands Campaign. The three vessels were Europic Ferry, Nordic Ferry, and Baltic Ferry. The Baltic Ferry entered the Falkland Islands Exclusion zone on 25 May 1982, she had been equipped with a helipad and carried three Army helicopters, 105 troops, and 1,874 tons of stores and ammunition to Ajax Bay on 1 June 1982. After the Falklands war, the vessel was moored in the inner harbour and used as a supply ship. Falkland Islands logistic battalion ( FILOG ) for operations on the island.

For a list of other ships requisitioned for MoD use see British naval forces in the Falklands War

== Sister Ships ==
- Global Freighter
- Doric Ferry
- Stena Shipper
- Elk
- Stena Prosper
- Atlantic Freighter
- Stena Project
- Cerdic Ferry
- Global Carrier
- Nordic Ferry
