= Jacklyn (ship) =

Floating landing platform owned by Blue Origin

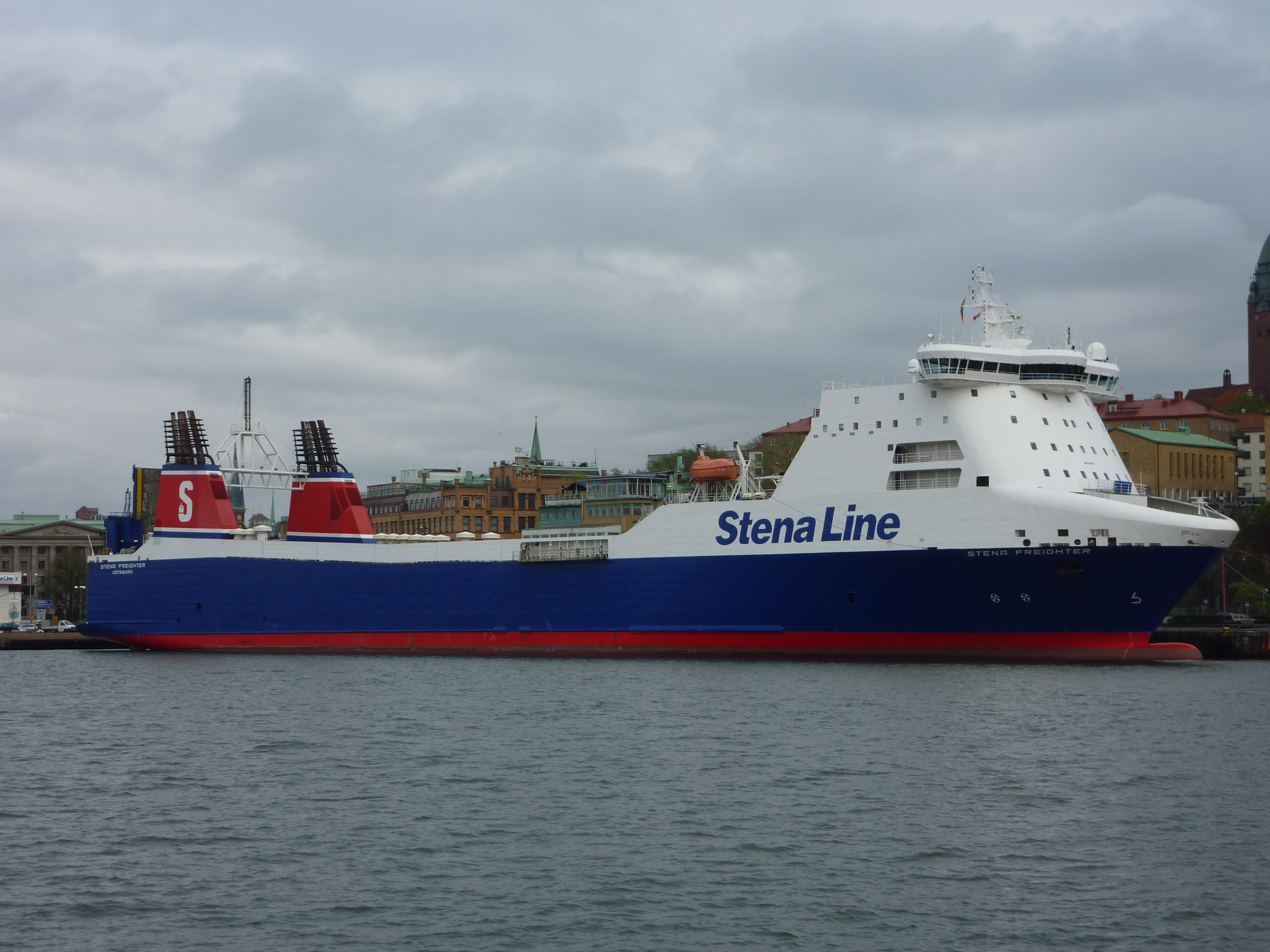
- Stena Freighter in May 2010

History
- Name: Jacklyn 2020–2022; LPV 2018–2020; Stena Freighter 2004–2018; Stena Seafreighter 2002–2004; RFA Sea Chieftain 1998–1999; Stena Hispanica 1997–1998
- Owner: Blue Origin 2018–2022; Stena Line 1997–2018 (contracted for future service with the Royal Fleet Auxiliary 1998-1999)
- Port of registry: Majuro, Marshall Islands 2018–2022
- Builder: Società Esercizio Cantieri, Viareggio, Italy (hull complete, 1999); Elektromehanika d.o.o. at Kraljevica Shipyard, Croatia (ship complete, 2004)
- Yard number: 1547
- Laid down: 19 February 1997
- Launched: 9 May 1998
- Completed: 12 March 2004
- Maiden voyage: 2004
- Out of service: October 2018
- Refit: 2018–2021
- Identification: IMO number: 9138795; MMSI number: 538008209; Call sign: V7A2085; DNV ID: 19270
- Fate: Scrapped in 2022

General characteristics
- Type: Floating landing platform 2018–2022; Ro-Ro cargo 2004–2018
- Tonnage: 21,104 GT; 10,048 DWT; 6,331 NT
- Length: 182.8 m (600 ft)
- Beam: 25.5 m (84 ft)
- Draft: 7.4 m (24 ft)
- Depth: 8.4 m (28 ft)
- Installed power: 4 × Sulzer 8ZAL40S diesel generator; 2 × MAN 6L28/32H diesel generator; 1 × Volvo Penta TAMD 163A emergency generator
- Propulsion: 2 × controllable-pitch propellers; 2 × maneuvering thrusters
- Speed: 22 kn (41 km/h; 25 mph)
- Capacity: 1 vertical rocket on landing deck; 2 horizontal New Glenn launch vehicles

Jacklyn, formerly known as LPV, Stena Freighter, Stena Seafreighter, RFA Sea Chieftain, and originally Stena Hispanica, was a roll-on/roll-off cargo ship which was purchased by Blue Origin in 2018 for use as a landing platform ship. Ultimately, Blue Origin abandoned its plans to use the ship as a landing platform, and in August 2022, the ship was towed to the Port of Brownsville for scrapping.

== History ==
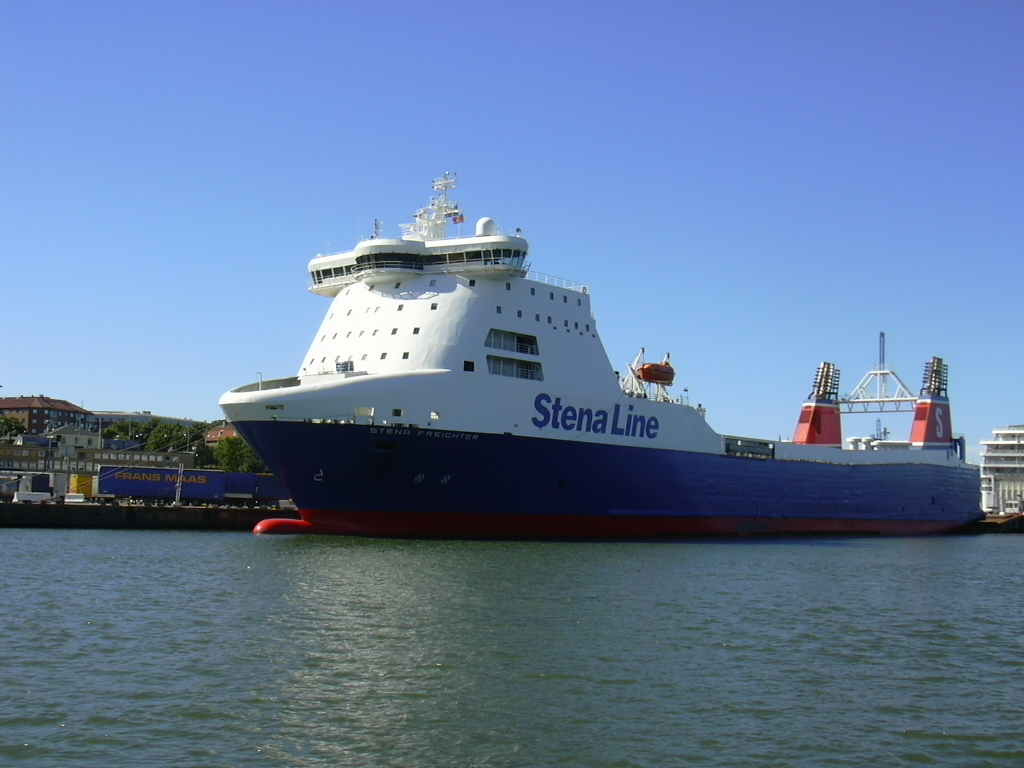
Stena Freighter in July 2006

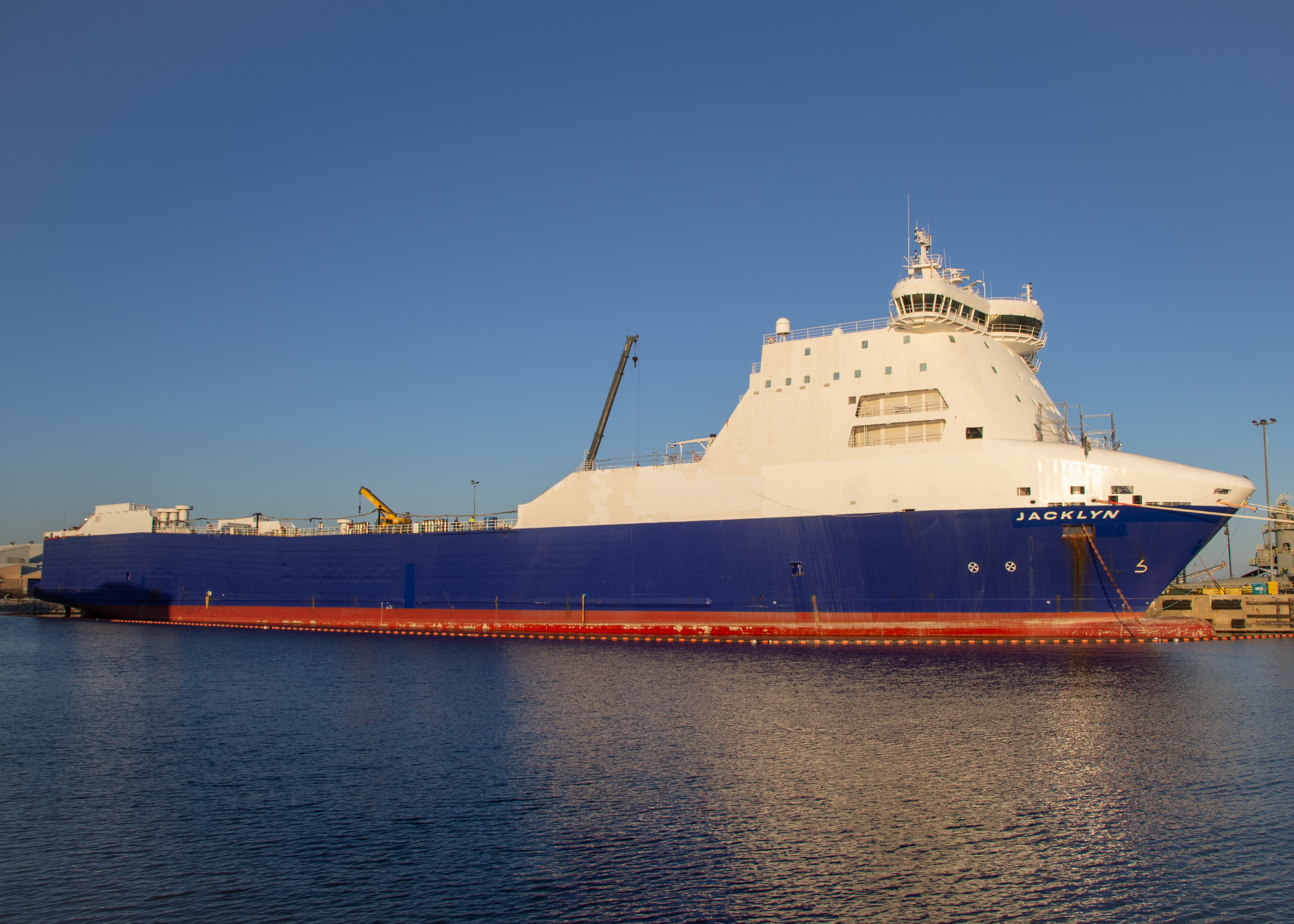
Jacklyn in January 2021

Stena Freighter was built by Società Esercizio Cantieri of Viareggio, Italy, and completed in 2004 by Elektromehanika d.o.o. at Kraljevica Shipyard, Croatia, for Swedish operator Stena Line.

The ship was initially laid down in February 1997 as Stena Hispanica for Stena Line, but on 5 May 1998 was renamed RFA Sea Chieftain (A97) after the British Ministry of Defence (MoD) contracted with Stena for a long-term charter of the vessel for freight-carrying capacity to support the Joint Rapid Reaction Force. The ship was launched four days later on 9 May 1998.

Società Esercizio Cantieri had fallen into financial difficulties, and the contract for the ship was cancelled in 1998 due to delays in construction. At the time, work on the hull was complete and the ship 50% finished. The shipyard went bankrupt in 1999, and all work on the ship ceased.

In 2002, the incomplete vessel was purchased from a bankruptcy estate at auction by Stena Line and renamed Stena Seafreighter. After months of additional financial and performance difficulties by several shipyards in Slovenia and Croatia in 2003, she was towed to Arsenale Shipyard in Venice, and then steamed under her own power to Kraljevica in Croatia for final completion. As a result of the delays, the ship never sailed as a Royal Fleet Auxiliary for the MoD. The ship was renamed Stena Freighter and delivered to Stena Line in March 2004.

Stena Freighter operated on a number of ferry routes including Gothenburg to Travemünde, Gothenburg to Kiel and Harwich to Rotterdam.

Stena confirmed the sale of the vessel on 30 August 2018, and in October 2018, Blue Origin, a U.S. launch service provider and space technology company owned by Amazon founder Jeff Bezos, confirmed it was the purchaser. The vessel sailed to Florida and arrived at Pensacola in October 2018 to commence a refit. In March 2017, Blue Origin had unveiled the concept of landing a rocket on a hydrodynamically-stabilized ship that was underway, but did not reveal which marine vessel would be used as the landing platform until October 2018.

Blue Origin called the ship LPV, short for Landing Platform Vessel. In December 2020, it was renamed Jacklyn, after Jeff Bezos' mother Jacklyn Bezos.

In April 2022, news surfaced that Blue Origin was no longer certain of plans to use Jacklyn for landing the first stage boosters of New Glenn. Later, Blue Origin abandoned the project to build a landing platform vessel. Jacklyn arrived under tow at Brownsville, Texas, on 19 August 2022 to be scrapped.

== Landing platform plans ==
If the ship had been used for rocket landings, the rocket boosters were planned to be recovered downrange of the Cape Canaveral Launch Complex 36 (LC-36) in the Atlantic Ocean while the hydrodynamically-stabilized ship was underway. The ship stabilization technology was intended to increase the likelihood of successful rocket recovery in rough seas, as well as helping to carry out launches on schedule.

The first stage boosters of New Glenn were intended to be reusable, and Jacklyn was to recover the boosters downrange in the Atlantic Ocean east of the launch site. The ship would not have been crewed at the time the New Glenn booster was going to be landing; but rather would be autonomously or telerobotically controlled.

In October 2018, Blue Origin said that its plans were to make the first orbital launch of New Glenn in 2021, but in February 2021, stated that the maiden flight was now targeted for late 2022, but the ship would no longer be used after Blue Origin abandoned the project to refit it as a landing platform ship.

In September 2024, Blue Origin revealed that a new landing barge, bought as a replacement for Jacklyn and tentatively known as Landing Platform Vessel 1, had also been given the name Jacklyn.

== See also ==
- Autonomous spaceport drone ship – Floating landing platform operated by SpaceX
- List of Stena Line vessels
- Virgin Galactic VMS Eve; the Virgin vehicle named after the founder's mother
- Landing Platform Vessel 1; the barge in service for New Glenn landings starting in 2024
