= MV A Regina =

Car ferry launched in 1967

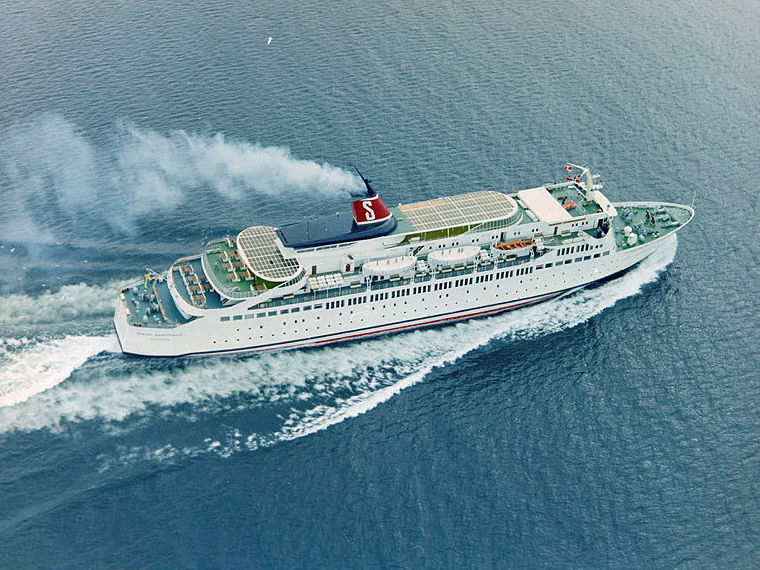
- Stena Germanica

History
- Name: Stena Germanica (1967–1979); A Regina (1979–1985)
- Owner: Armatur Sa Panama
- Operator: Dominican Ferries
- Port of registry: Sweden (1967–1979); Panama (1979–1985)
- Route: Mayagüez to San Pedro de Macoris
- Builder: Langesund mekaniske verksted, Norway
- Laid down: 1966
- Launched: 7 February 1966
- Christened: 1967
- Completed: 1967
- In service: 1967–1985
- Out of service: 1985
- Identification: IMO number: 6702155
- Fate: Ran aground off Isla de Mona, 15 February 1985

General characteristics
- Tonnage: 701 dwt; 5195 grt
- Length: 110.80 m
- Beam: 18.00 m
- Draught: 4.8 m
- Installed power: 2 pcs. 16-cylinder MAN diesel, 12710 kW
- Propulsion: 2 pcs. propeller with adjustable screw
- Speed: 23.5 knots
- Capacity: 1300 passengers, 384 berths, 220 cars
- Crew: 72

MV A. Regina was a Panamanian flagged 330 foot long passenger Ro-Ro car ferry operated by Dominican Ferries, IMO:6702155. The ship, originally named Stena Germanica, was built in 1967 by Langesund mekaniske verksted in Langesund, Norway. The vessel was delivered on April 15, 1967 to Stena AB, and was officially named Stena Germanica on April 21, 1967 with godmother Helga Renger. In February 1979, it was sold to Armatur Sa Panama (Corsica Ferries) and renamed A. Regina. On February 15, 1985, the Dominican Ferries A. Regina ran aground and was wrecked on a reef off Isla de Mona in the Mona Passage.

== Routes ==
- Gothenburg – Frederikshavn (some trips) (Autumn 1967)
- Gothenburg – Kiel (April 24, 1967 – Autumn 1967)
- Algeria – Marseille (November, 1967)
- Gothenburg – Kiel (12 December 1967 – 1973)
- Korsor – Kiel (Summer, 1972)
- Mariehamn – Stockholm (July 1973 – 1974)
- Gothenburg – Kiel (April 1974 – August 1974)
- Gothenburg – Frederikshavn (August 1974)
- Gothenburg – Kiel (June 1975 – August 1975)
- Gothenburg – Frederikshavn (June 1975 – August 1975)
- Hotel ship in Stavanger (October 1975 – December 1975)
- Algeria – Marseille (June 1976 – November 1976)
- Cork – Swansea (1978) supply vessel for drilling rigs. Chartered to Chevron, USA (May 1978 – December 1978)
- Gothenburg – Kiel (21 december 1978 – January 1979)
- San Remo – Genoa – Livorno – Bastia – Calvi – Livorno – Bastia (April 1979 – 1984)
- Casino ship in Bastia, Italy. (1984)
- Mayagüez, Puerto Rico – San Pedro de Macoris, Dominican Republic (October 1984 – February 15, 1985)

== Operators ==
Stena AB, Sweden (15 April 1967 – February 1979)

- Compagnie Nationale de Navigation Algerienne (CNAN), Algiers (November, 1967)
- Entreprise Nationale de Transport Maritime de Voyageurs (ENTMV), Algiers, Algeria (June 1976 – November 1979)
- B & I Line, Dublin, Ireland (1978)
- Shell UK Exploration & Production Division, Aberdeen, Scotland (May 1978 – October 1978)
- Chevron, USA (October, 1978 – December 1978)

Amartur Sa (Corsica Ferries), Panama (February, 1979 – 1989)

- Dominican Ferries SA, Panama (October 1984 – February 15, 1985)

== 1985 Grounding and Shipwreck ==
On February 15, 1985 at 1:20 am, while en route from Mayagüez, Puerto Rico, to San Pedro de Macoris, Dominican Republic the ship ran aground a reef off southeastern Isla de Mona, an uninhabited marine and nature sanctuary located approximately 80 km from Mayagüez. At 1:40 AM the master of A. Regina contacted the U.S. Coast Guard and described the vessel's situation, advised that there was no immediate danger, and indicated that it would be best to wait until daylight before having the passengers and crew leave the vessel. A helicopter from Coast Guard Air Station Borinquen was dispatched to the scene. As day broke, using the ship's lifeboats, 143 passengers and 72 crew members landed on Mona Island to await rescue. There were no casualties or serious injuries.

At 10:30 AM, the frigate USS Joseph Hewes arrived on scene but due to surf conditions Joseph Hewes was unable to use its small boats to transport persons from the beach. Joseph Hewes remained nearby and using its helicopter delivered hot food, soft drinks, and water to the evacuees on Mona Island.

Transporting the stranded A. Regina evacuees out of Isla de Mona was delayed due to miscommunication between federal and local government agencies. By late afternoon children, pregnant women and those needing special care were first to be transported out of Mona Island by helicopter. It became apparent, given the limited occupant capacity of the helicopters available, that transporting all the evacuees before nightfall would not be possible. As night set on February 15, 1985, only about half of the evacuees had been transported back to Mayagüez, Puerto Rico. Evacuation flights at night were deemed not safe, so food and blankets were brought by helicopter to the remaining evacuees, who had no option but to spend a night on the island reserve. By dawn Saturday, February 16, 1985 helicopters from the Puerto Rico Air National Guard, United States Army, United States Coast Guard and Dominican Air Force were able to pick up the remaining passengers and crew. The last group of evacuees arrived back to Mayagüez at 1:15 PM, nearly 36 hours after the grounding.

Attempts to re-float the ship were unsuccessful. A. Regina, valued at the time at US$5 million, and the 31 automobiles on board, were considered a total loss. The National Transportation Safety Board (NTSB) published its findings of their investigation in 1986 (NTSB-MAR-86-02) which determined that the master of the ship, Captain Ascenzio Bessone, was responsible for the grounding by failing to “monitor the vessel's progress along the charted course line by plotting navigation fixes so as to detect the vessel's set and drift”. Also in 1986, based on a review of the Federal and Puerto Rico government response to the A. Regina grounding incident, the NTSB issued a Safety Recommendation calling for the Puerto Rican government to "[a]ssist the U.S. Coast Guard in developing a memorandum of understanding concerning responsibilities, communications, and coordination of logistics among the agencies responsible for participating in various search and rescue emergency and nonemergency situations on the Puerto Rican offshore islands".

The MV A. Regina wrecksite was situated at approximately 18°3.20′N 67°53.02′W. Debris and leaked fuel from the MV A. Regina wreck started washing ashore in the Isla de Mona reserve as the vessel rusted and was slowly breaking apart. Environmentalists, concerned that the wreck posed a threat to endangered turtles and other wildlife, advocated for its removal from the reef. In 1988 the United States Congress included a provision in the Water Resources Development Act of 1988 Pub. L. 100–676 for the removal of the abandoned wreck of A. Regina. The United States government also passed law Pub. L. 100–653 in which Section 902 of the law provided for the transfer of a Delong Pier Jack-Up Barge Type A to a private entity for use in A. Regina wreck removal effort. In 1990 the wreck of A. Regina was removed and scrapped in situ from the Isla de Mona reef by Titan Maritime Industries, a marine salvage company using the jack-up barge procured from the federal government.
