= MS Express Aphrodite =

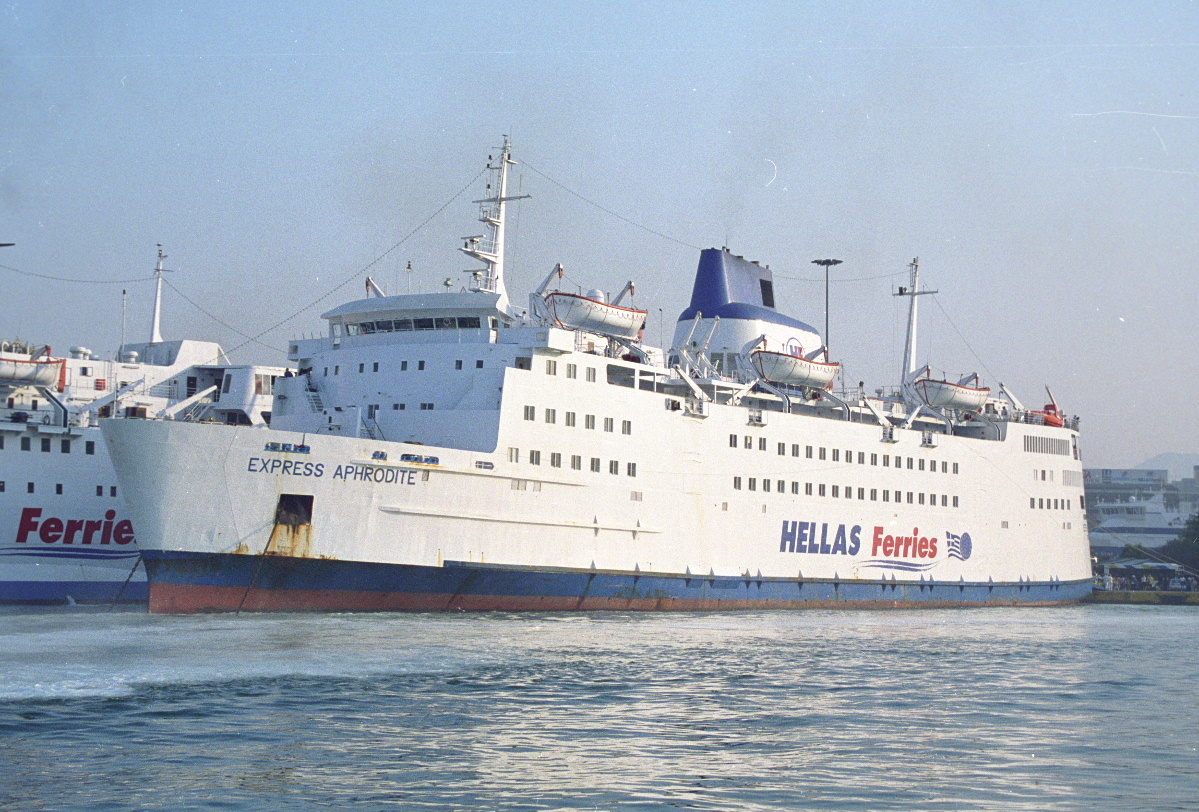
- Express Aphrodite at Piraeus in 2000.

History
- Name: 1977–1991: St. Columba; 1991–1996: Stena Hibernia; 1996–1997: Stena Adventurer; 1997–2007: Express Aphrodite; 2007–2021: Masarrah; 2021: Asarrah
- Operator: Namma Shipping Lines (2007–2021)
- Port of registry: Gabon (2021)
- Builder: Aalborg Vaerft, Denmark
- Yard number: 214
- Launched: 17 July 1976
- Completed: 1977
- Acquired: 1977
- Maiden voyage: 1977
- In service: 1977-2021
- Out of service: December 2021
- Identification: IMO number: 7507019
- Fate: Scrapped at Gadani, Pakistan, December 2021.

General characteristics
- Tonnage: 11,690 GT
- Length: 129.2 m (423 ft 11 in)
- Beam: 20.6 m (67 ft 7 in)
- Draught: 4.7 m (15 ft 5 in)
- Installed power: 2 × Stork-Werkspoor 16TM410
- Capacity: 1,700 passengers; 52 berths; 335 cars; 430 lane metres

MS Express Aphrodite was a ferry originally named St. Columba. Built in 1977, at the Aalborg Shipyard in Denmark, St. Columba was originally a Sealink UK ferry, operating between Holyhead and Dún Laoghaire in the Irish Sea. She laterally operated between Duba and Jeddah for Namma Shipping Lines. She was beached at Gadani for scrapping in December 2021.

St. Columbia was featured in the 1980 film: The Hard Way.

== Fire ==
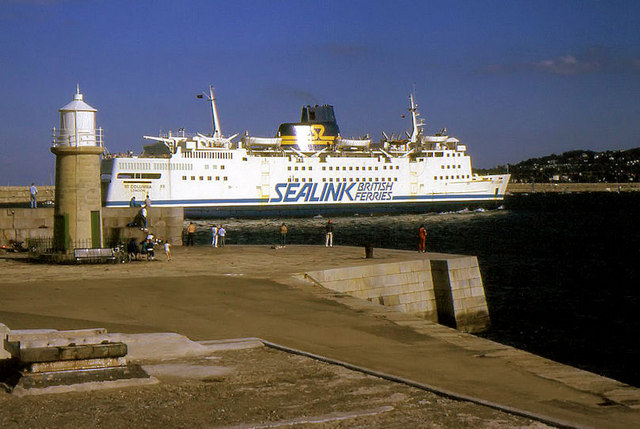
St. Columba at Dún Laoghaire

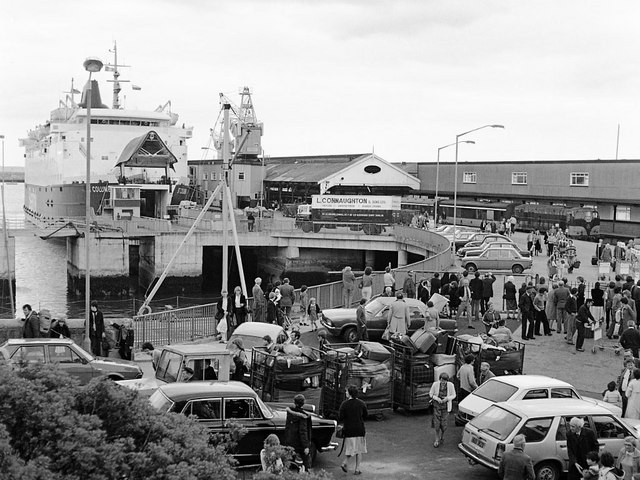
St. Columba

On 31 January 1990, a fire broke out in the engine room of St. Columba. None of the 199 passengers on board were injured, however a fireman suffered a fractured ulna.

The Captain praised the work of the staff on board the ferry in preventing the spread of the fire, and keeping the passengers safe and re-assured. As there was too much oil to re-ignite the engines, the ship had to be towed for the remainder of the journey to Holyhead port.

== Ownership by Stena Line ==
In 1990, Sealink was taken over by Stena Line, and with this new investment, came an £8 million re-fit for St Columba, and her name was changed to Stena Hibernia. In 1996, with the introduction of the HSS fast ferries, Hibernia was again re-named, this time as Stena Adventurer, with the intention of her moving to the English Channel to serve the Dover to Calais route. This move, however, never materialised, and Stena Adventurer was sold to Agapitos Express Ferries of Greece.

== Ownership by Agapitos Express Ferries ==
Stena Adventurer was renamed Express Aphrodite.

== Ship's names ==
- St. Columba (1977–1990)
- Stena Hibernia (1990–1996)
- Stena Adventurer (1996–1997)
- Express Aphrodite (1997–2007)
- Masarrah (2007–2021)
- Asarrah (2021)

== Scrapping ==
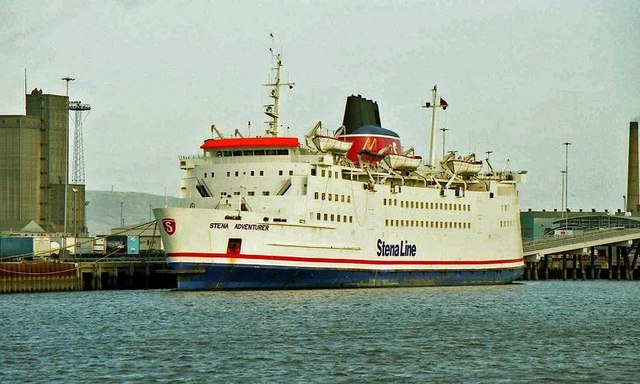
Stena Adventurer at Belfast.

Masarrah was beached as Asarrah at Gadani Ship Breaking Yard, Pakistan, on the morning of 2 December 2021 for scrapping. She was flying the flag of Gabon at the time.

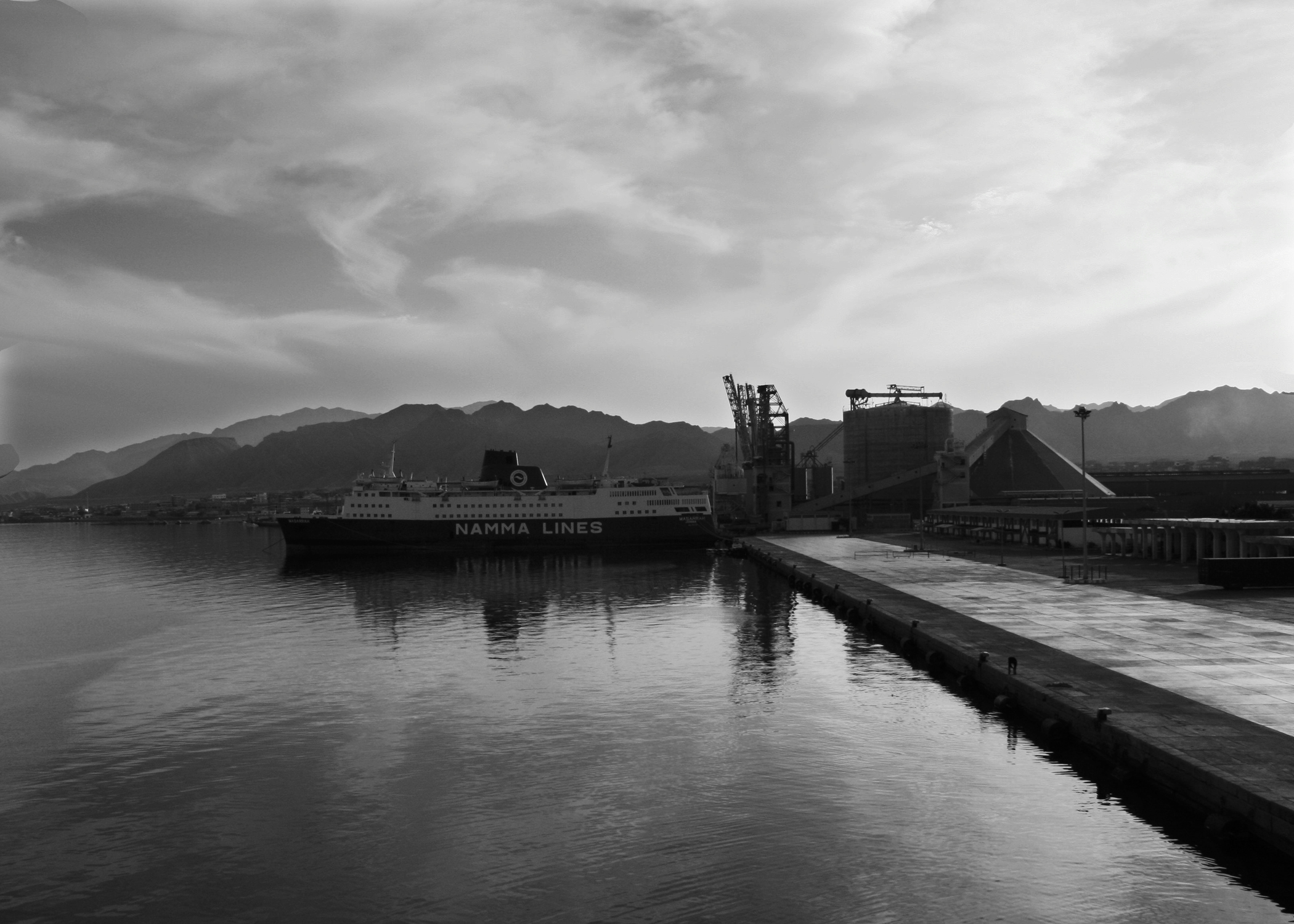
Masarrah at Safaga.
