= Stena Hollandica =

Ferry built in 2010

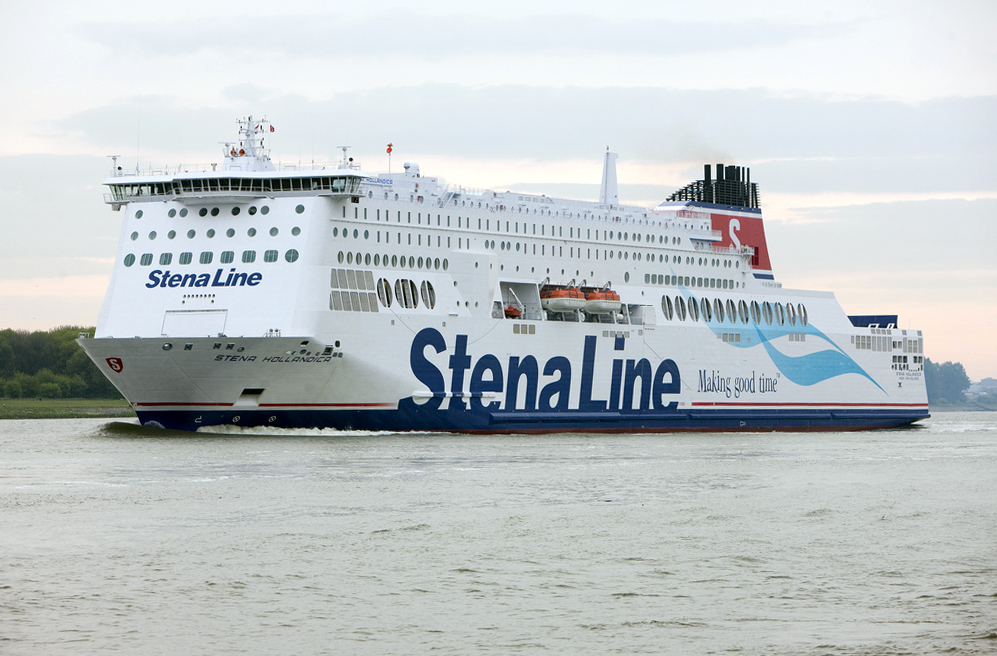

History
- Name: Stena Hollandica
- Owner: Stena Line
- Operator: Stena Line
- Port of registry: Harwich
- Route: Harwich - Hook of Holland
- Builder: Wadan Yards, Wismar, Germany.
- Yard number: 159
- Launched: 7 June 2009
- Completed: 2010
- Maiden voyage: June 2010
- Identification: IMO number: 9419163
- Status: In service

General characteristics
- Class & type: RoPax Cruiseferry
- Tonnage: 64,039 GT
- Length: 240.87 m (790 ft 3 in)
- Beam: 32.00 m (105 ft 0 in)
- Height: 51 m (167 ft 4 in)
- Draught: 6.5 m (21 ft 4 in)
- Decks: 12
- Installed power: 33,600 kW
- Propulsion: 2 × 8L48/60CR and 2 × 6L48/60CR MAN 4 stroke diesel engines.
- Speed: 22 kn (41 km/h)
- Capacity: Passengers: 1,200; 538 cabins; 1,376 passenger beds; Vehicles: 230 car capacity; 5,500 lane meters
- Crew: 85
- Notes: Sister ship is Stena Britannica

Stena Hollandica, launched in January 2010, is the first of two identical roll-on/roll-off ferries built by Wadan Yards in Warnemünde and nearby Wismar, Germany for Stena Line. The second of the two ships, launched towards the end of 2010, is the Stena Britannica. Both ships operate (2012) across the southern North Sea between Harwich and Hook of Holland providing a twice daily service (taking seven hours) from each side. The ships were specifically designed for this route.

== Power and its transmission ==
Stena Hollandica has four main MAN diesel engines, producing between them 33,600 kilowatts, and providing for a maximum speed of 22 knots (41 km/h). Two of the engines are rated at 9,600 kW and the other two at 7,200 kW. The engines are connected via two gearboxes to two controllable pitch propellers. The two rudders, one behind each propeller, are of the Becker flap type with twisted leading edges. Control of the bow while docking is by two tunnel thrusters.

Heat from the main engines is also used to heat the ship.

== Loading characteristics ==
The vehicle decks can be loaded on two levels from both the bow and stern on decks 3 and 5 and there are two tier linkspans at both Harwich and Hook of Holland to accommodate the ship.

== Extended gestation ==
The ferries, then designated "RoPax 55" ferries, were originally ordered from the ship builders Waden Yards (subsequently subsumed into Nordic Yards Wismar) by Stena Line in 2006. The total value of the order amounted to approximately €400 million. Delays arose when Stena temporarily withdrew the order in response to economic difficulties being experienced by Waden Yards. After further negotiations the order was reinstated, but the new agreement included a price cut of 6% or approximately €24 million. The ships having been completed, naming ceremonies took place on 8 June 2010 for the Stena Hollandica at the Hook of Holland and on 19 October 2010 at Harwich for the Stena Britannica.
