= Stena Jutlandica =

Swedish ferry

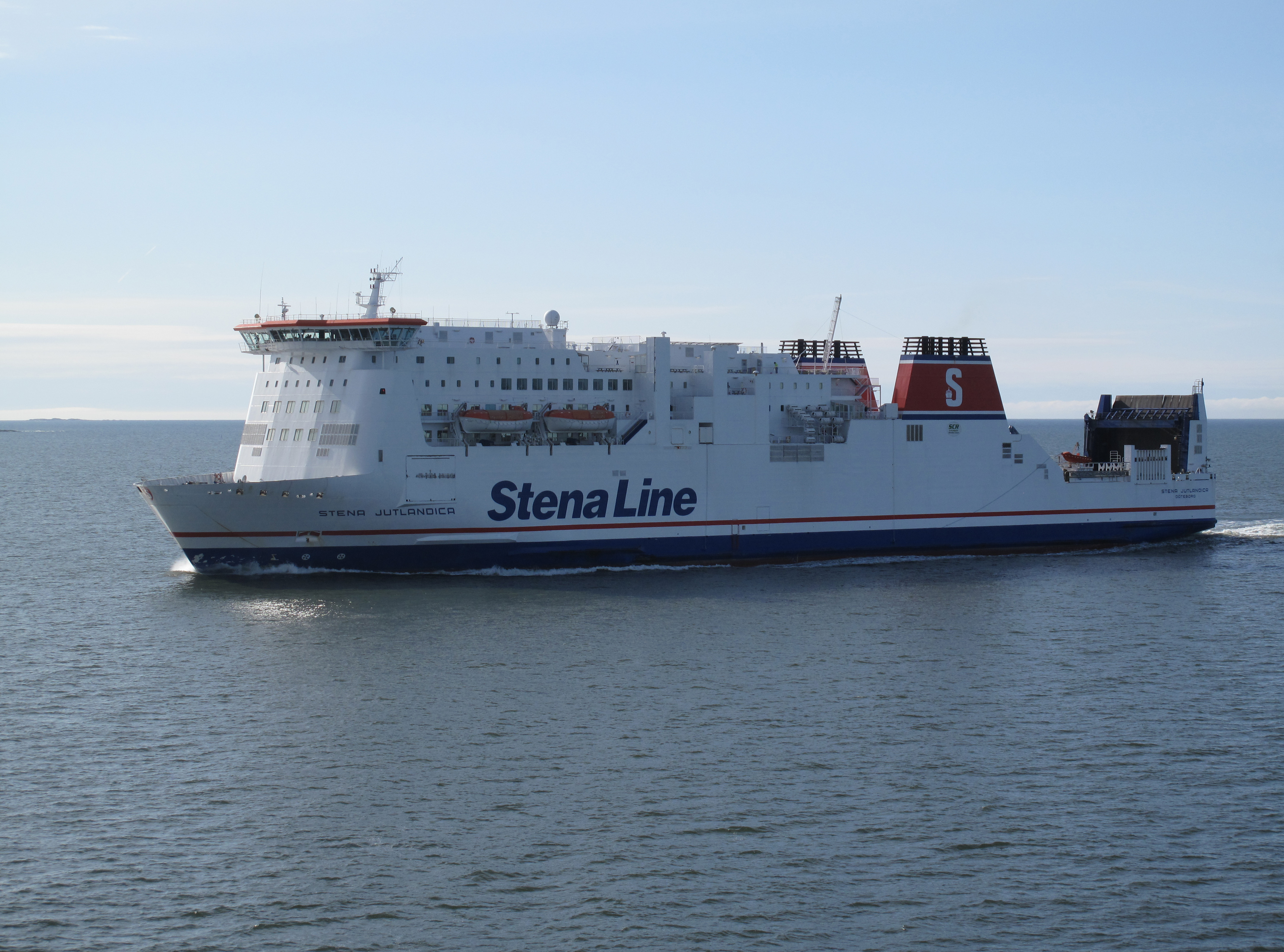
- Stena Jutlandica in Gothenburg

History
- Name: Stena Jutlandica
- Operator: Stena Line
- Port of registry: Gothenburg, Sweden
- Route: Gothenburg-Fredrikshavn
- Builder: Van der Giessen de Noord
- Yard number: 967
- Launched: 2 March 1996
- Identification: IMO number: 9125944
- Status: In service

General characteristics
- Tonnage: 29,691 GT
- Length: 184 m (603 ft 8 in)
- Beam: 28 m (91 ft 10 in)
- Draught: 6.00 m (19 ft 8 in)
- Installed power: 4 × MAN B&W 9L 40/54 diesel engines
- Propulsion: 2 × controllable pitch propellers; 2 × KaMeWa bow thrusters
- Speed: 21.5 knots (39.8 km/h; 24.7 mph)
- Capacity: 1,500 passengers; 550 cars; 2,100 lane meters
- Notes: 1 MWh battery

Stena Jutlandica is a Swedish registered Passenger / Vehicle / Train ferry owned and operated by Stena Line. The vessel operates between Gothenburg and Frederikshavn.

Stena Jutlandica is the first of two similar ships built by Van der Giessen de Noord. The second vessel operates on the Dover Strait as the Isle of Inishmore.

== History ==
The vessel was launched in March 1996 as the Stena Jutlandica. Prior to entering service the vessel was renamed Stena Jutlandica III.

In August 1996 the vessel returned to her original name following the transfer of the previous Stena Jutlandica to the English Channel.

On 23 January 1998 Stena Jutlandica collided with the Chemical tanker Brevik near Gothenburg.

In the early morning of 19 July 2015 Stena Jutlandica collided with the tanker Ternvind near Gothenburg, leaving a hole in the hull.

In March 2018 Stena Line has announced the plan to convert the ship to electric propulsion with a 1 MWh battery pack.
