= Stena Britannica =

Ship built in 2010

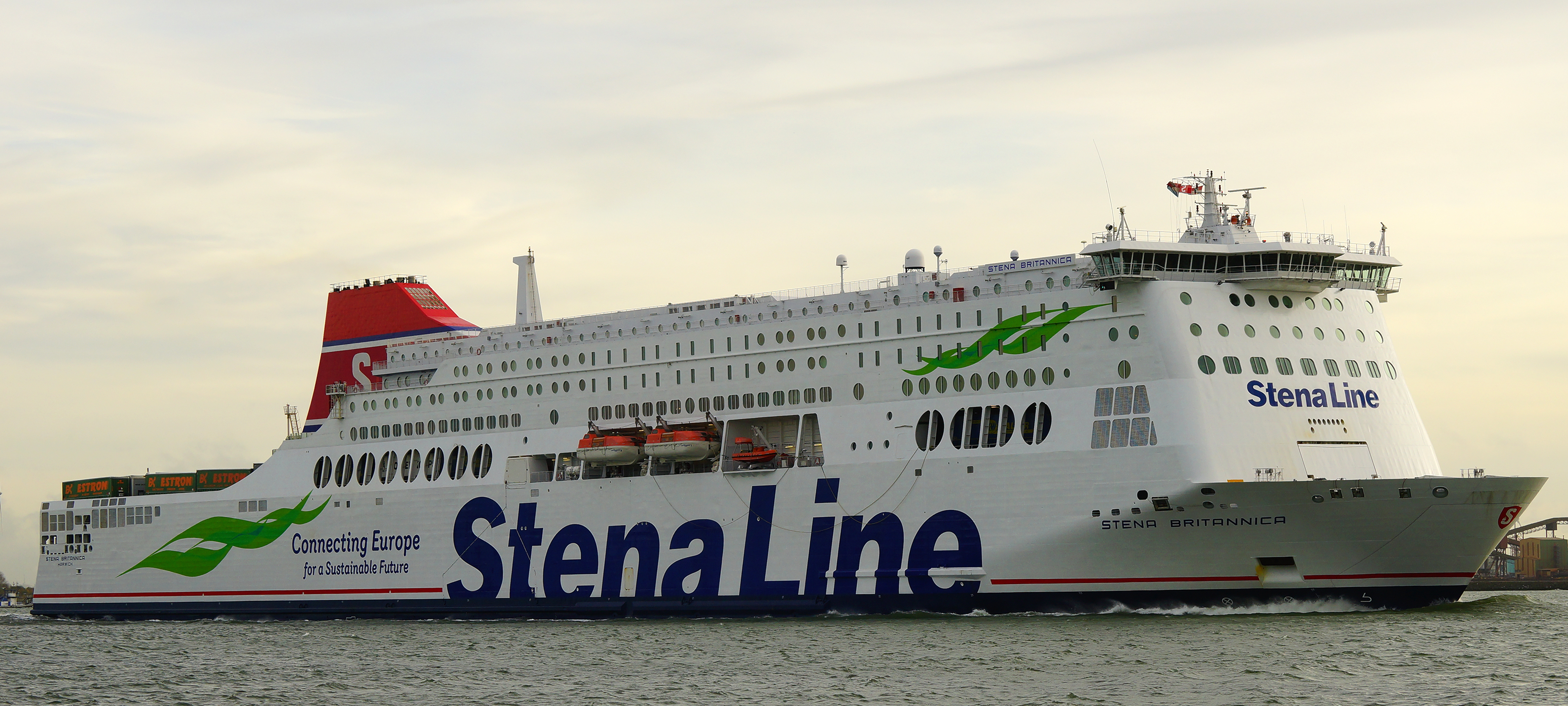
- Stena Britannica in November 2016

History
- Name: Stena Britannica
- Owner: Stena Ropax Ltd
- Operator: Stena Line
- Port of registry: Harwich
- Route: Harwich – Hook of Holland
- Builder: Wadan Yards, Wismar, Germany.
- Yard number: 164
- Laid down: 17 December 2008
- Launched: 7 June 2009
- Completed: 2010
- Maiden voyage: 9 October 2010
- Identification: IMO number: 9419175
- Status: In service

General characteristics
- Class & type: RoPax Cruiseferry
- Tonnage: 64,039 GT
- Length: 240 m (787 ft 5 in)
- Beam: 32 m (105 ft 0 in)
- Height: 51 m (167 ft 4 in)
- Draught: 6.65 m (21 ft 10 in)
- Decks: 12
- Ice class: 1B FS
- Installed power: 33.6 MW (45,100 hp)
- Propulsion: 2 x 8L48/60CR and 2 x 6L48/60CR MAN 4-stroke diesel engines.
- Speed: 22 knots (41 km/h; 25 mph)
- Capacity: Passengers; 1,200; 538 cabins; 1,376 passenger beds; Vehicles; 230 car capacity; 5,500 lane meters
- Crew: 85

Stena Britannica, launched in 2009, is the second of two identical Ropax cruiseferries built by Wadan Yards in Warnemünde and nearby Wismar, Germany for Stena Line. The first of the two ships, launched in January 2010, was Stena Hollandica. Both ships operate across the southern North Sea between Harwich in Essex, England, and Hook of Holland, Netherlands, providing a twice daily service. The ships were specifically designed for this route.

== Design and description ==
Stena Britannica has four main MAN diesel engines, producing between them 33,600 kilowatts (45,100 hp), and providing for a maximum speed of 22 knots (41 km/h; 25 mph). Two of the engines are rated at 9,600 kW (12,900 hp) and the other two at 7,200 kW (9,700 hp). The engines are connected via two gearboxes to two controllable pitch propellers. The two rudders, one behind each propeller, are of the Becker flap type with twisted leading edges. Control of the bow while docking is by two tunnel thrusters. Heat from the main engines is also used to heat the ship.

=== Loading characteristics ===
The vehicle decks can be loaded on two levels from both the bow and stern on decks 3 and 5 and there are two-tier linkspans in both Harwich and Hook of Holland to accommodate the ship.

== Construction and career ==
The ferries, then designated "RoPax 55" ferries, were originally ordered from the shipbuilders Waden Yards (subsequently subsumed into Nordic Yards Wismar) by Stena Line in 2006. The total value of the order amounted to approximately €400 million. Delays arose when Stena temporarily withdrew the order in response to economic difficulties being experienced by Waden Yards. After further negotiations the order was reinstated, but the new agreement included a price cut of 6% or approximately €24 million. The ships having been completed, naming ceremonies took place on 8 June 2010 for Stena Hollandica at Hook of Holland and on 19 October 2010 at Harwich for Stena Britannica.

On the overnight crossing between Hook of Holland and Harwich on 17 January 2018, a fire broke out on one of the refrigerated lorries and subsequently spread to other lorries but did not breach the lorry decks. The vessel was subsequently taken to Schiedam and returned to service three days after the fire.

== In popular culture ==
Stena Britannica is the focus of the season 4, episode 4 of the documentary TV show Mighty Ships. The episode first aired on 16 October 2011. During filming a problem with the locking pins of the bow watertight door meant that, for 72 hours / six crossings, loading and unloading could only be carried out via the upper ramp while engineers worked night and day to resolve the problem.
