= MS Nordic Ferry =

Car ferry built in 1967

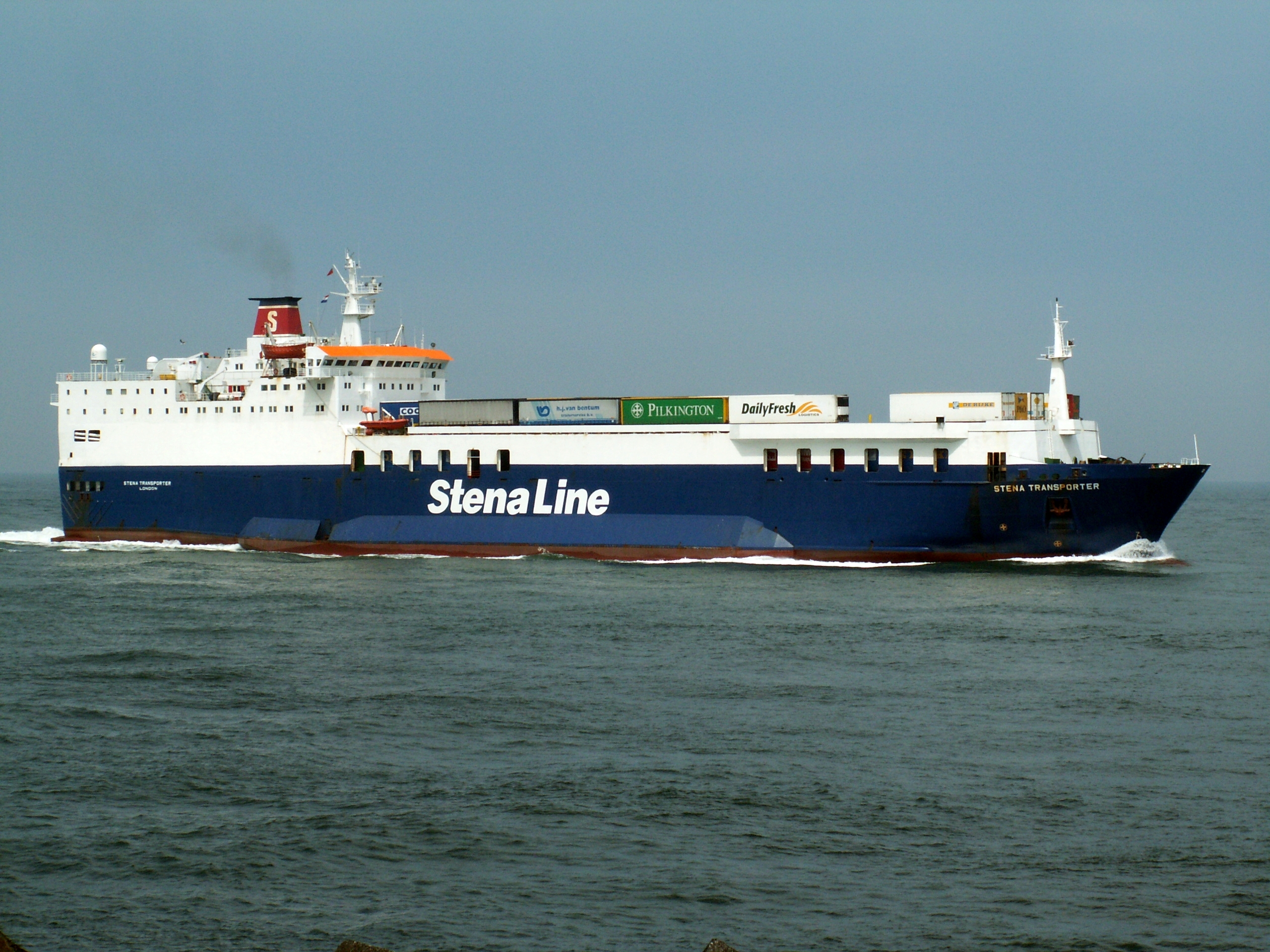
- Stena Transporter in 2005, approaching Rotterdam

History
- Name: Merzario Espania/Merzario Hispania (1978–1980); Nordic Ferry (1980–1992); Pride of Flanders (1992–2002); Flanders (2002); Stena Transporter (2002–2009); Strada Corsa (2009–2013); La Paz Star (2013–2016); Med Star (2016–2017); Star (2017)
- Operator: Merzario Line (1978–1980); Townsend Thoresen (1980–1982); Ministry of Defence (1982); Townsend Thoresen (1982–1987); P&O European Ferries (1987–2002); Stena Line (2002–2009); Strade Blu (2009–2013); Baja ferries (2013–2016); Blue Star Ferries (2016–2017)
- Port of registry: London, United Kingdom (1978–2016); La Paz, Mexico (2013–15); Limassol, Cyprus (2015–17)
- Launched: 20 March 1978
- Identification: IMO number: 7528659
- Honours and awards: Falkland Islands 1982
- Fate: Broken up 2017

General characteristics
- Tonnage: 5,539 GRT, 2,485 NRT, 8,672 DWT (1978–80); 6,566 GRT, 3,284 NRT, 8,704 DWT (1981–86); 18,732 GRT, 10,578 NRT, 8,704 DWT (1986–95); 16,776 GT, 8,704 DWT (1995–2017)
- Length: 151.95 metres (498 ft 6 in)
- Beam: 21.67 metres (71 ft 1 in) (1978–86); 23.50 metres (77 ft 1 in) (1986–2017)
- Depth: 6.45 metres (21 ft 2 in) (1978–86); 7.27 metres (23 ft 10 in) (1986–2017)
- Installed power: 2×Pielstick 12PC2-5V-400-V diesel engines, 11,475 kilowatts (15,388 hp)
- Speed: 17 knots (31 km/h)

MS Nordic Ferry was a car ferry built in South Korea as Merzario Espania in 1978 for the Stena Container Line. She operated on Stena's Merzario Line and was renamed Merzario Hispania. Sold to European Ferries in 1980 she was jumboised and renamed Nordic Ferry before sailing on the Felixstowe–Europoort route under the Townsend Thoresen brand. She was taken up from trade by the British government in 1982 to carry troops and stores during the Falklands War, returning to commercial service later that year. She served on the Felixstowe–Zeebrugge routes after a 1986 refit, and was renamed Pride of Flanders after the Townsend Thoresen rebranding to P&O European Ferries the following year. She was sold to Stena Line in 2002 and renamed Flanders and then Stena Transporter. In 2009 she was sold to Strade Blu and renamed Strada Corsa, serving on their Livorno to Olbia route in Italian waters. Sold to Baja Ferries in 2013 and renamed La Paz Star she sailed to the Pacific and served on routes along the northern part of the Western Mexican coast. She was sold again to Medferry Shipping in 2016 and the following year returned to European waters. After a refit she served on the Rhodes to Santorini route in Greek waters. She caught fire in June 2017 and, though saved, was afterwards scrapped in Turkey under the name Star.

== Description ==
As built, the ship was 151.95 metres (498 ft 6 in) long, with a beam of 21.67 metres (71 ft 1 in) and a depth of 6.45 metres (21 ft 2 in). She was assessed at 5,539 GRT, 2,485 NRT, 8,672 DWT. She was powered by two Pielstick 12PC2-5V-400-V diesel engines rated at a total of 11,475 kilowatts (15,388 hp) giving a maximum speed of 17 knots (31 km/h). She had accommodation for 12 passengers.

== History ==
=== Early career ===
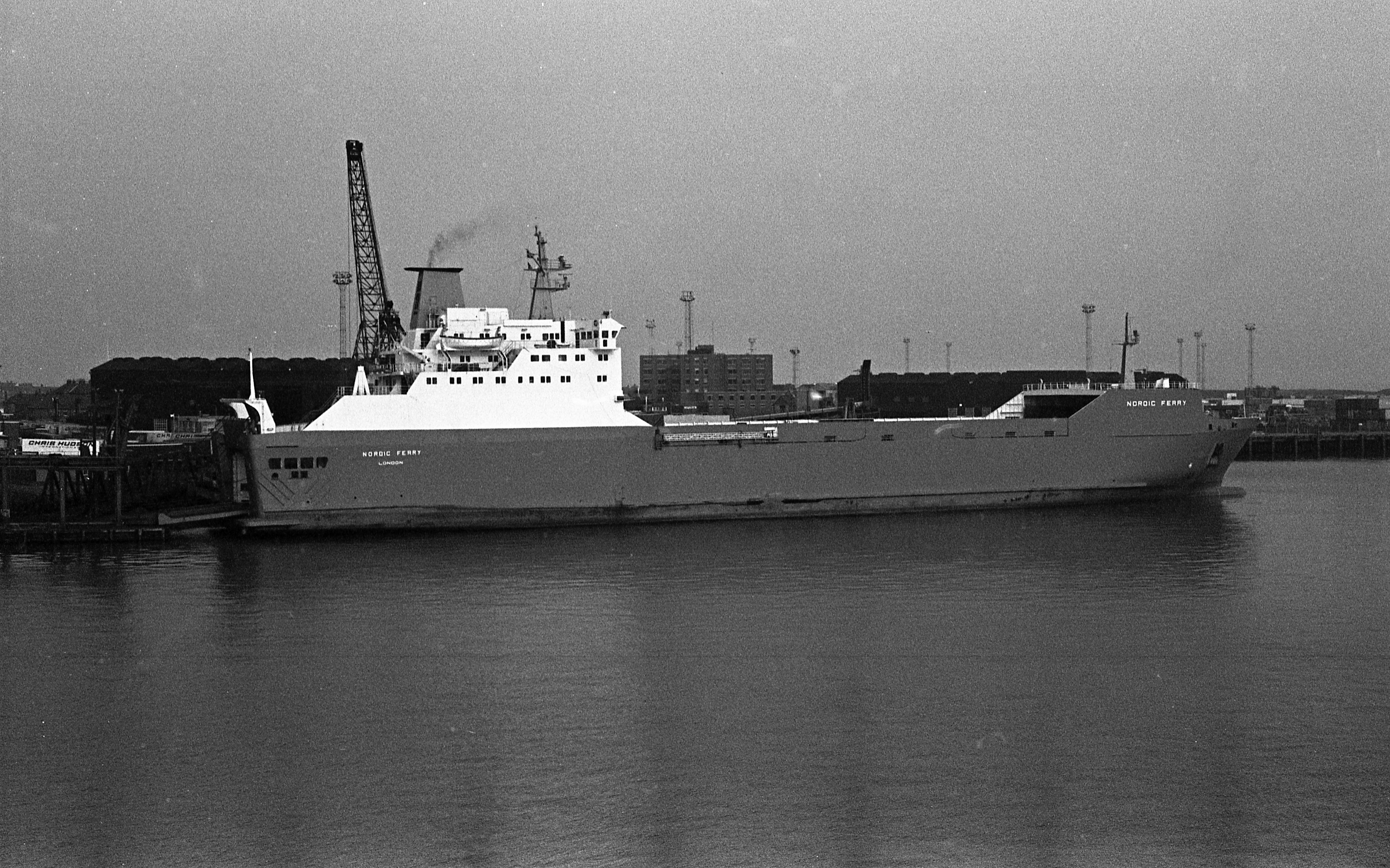
As "Nordic Ferry", Felixstowe, April 1980

The ship was built in 1978 as Merzario Espania for Stena Container Line's Merzario Line. She was constructed by Hyundai at their Ulsan, South Korea shipyard; her IMO number was 7528659. She first sailed in August 1978 and was later renamed Merzario Hispania. She was sold in 1980 to European Ferries who renamed her Nordic Ferry and operated her under their Townsend Thoresen brand. From December 1980 to February 1981 she was in the Hapag Lloyd Werft shipyards in Bremerhaven, Germany, undergoing jumboisation to increase passenger capacity. After rebuilding, she was assessed at 6,566 GRT, 3,284 NRT, 8,704 DWT. She was afterwards employed on the Felixstowe–Europoort route.

=== Falklands War ===
Nordic Ferry was in Europoort on 3 May 1982, preparing to sail for Felixstowe, when she was taken up from trade by the British government for service in the Falklands War. She sailed for the UK and from 4–9 May underwent an extensive refit for service as a troop and stores ship. Two 15-square-metre (160 sq ft) helipads were installed on her top deck, made from 12-millimetre (0.47 in) thick steel. Landing aids and 102 helicopter tying-down points were also installed. A replenishment at sea mast with a 6-inch (150 mm) fuel line was installed to her shelter deck, some of her bulwarks were removed and additional life rafts installed. Internally she was fitted with satellite communications with teleprinters, satellite navigation, additional galley equipment and a reverse osmosis freshwater plant. She displaced 6,455 tons and was capable of making 17 knots (31 km/h; 20 mph).

Together with sister ship Baltic Ferry and Sealink's St Edmund she carried personnel and equipment of the 5th Infantry Brigade and associated logistics support units. Her main deck was loaded with stores and equipment, at the bow were 15 rows of pallets of ammunition, stacked three-high, followed by six pallet rows of rations, eight of other equipment, containers of refrigerated goods and, at the stern, military vehicles. Since the stern door was the only access, almost everything else had to be unloaded to reach the ammunition.

Nordic Ferry carried approximately half of the stores and many of the personnel of 10 Field Workshop, a maintenance support unit. The majority of their stores were never unloaded and remained on board for the duration of the war, the unit never being deployed in its main role and instead being used to guard Argentine prisoners of war. With Nordic Ferry, Baltic Ferry and St Edmund removed from service, capacity on the Harwich/Felixstowe to Holland routes was greatly reduced and Townsend Thoresen chartered two replacement vessels.

Nordic Ferry sailed from Portsmouth on 9 May and carried out replenishment at sea and helicopter landing trials in The Solent. She afterwards proceeded to Freetown, Sierra Leone, and sailed in company with Baltic Ferry. The two vessels parted company on 29 May to proceed independently to the Falklands. After unloading her stores she was escorted eastwards by the frigate Penelope. On 8 July she picked up 85 Royal Marines from King Edward Point, South Georgia, taking them onboard from a tug backed up to her open stern ramp. Nordic Ferry sailed for the UK on 29 July and upon her arrival was refitted for commercial use, returning to service at Felixstowe on 25 August. In recognition of her service she was awarded the battle honour "Falkland Islands 1982".

=== Later career ===
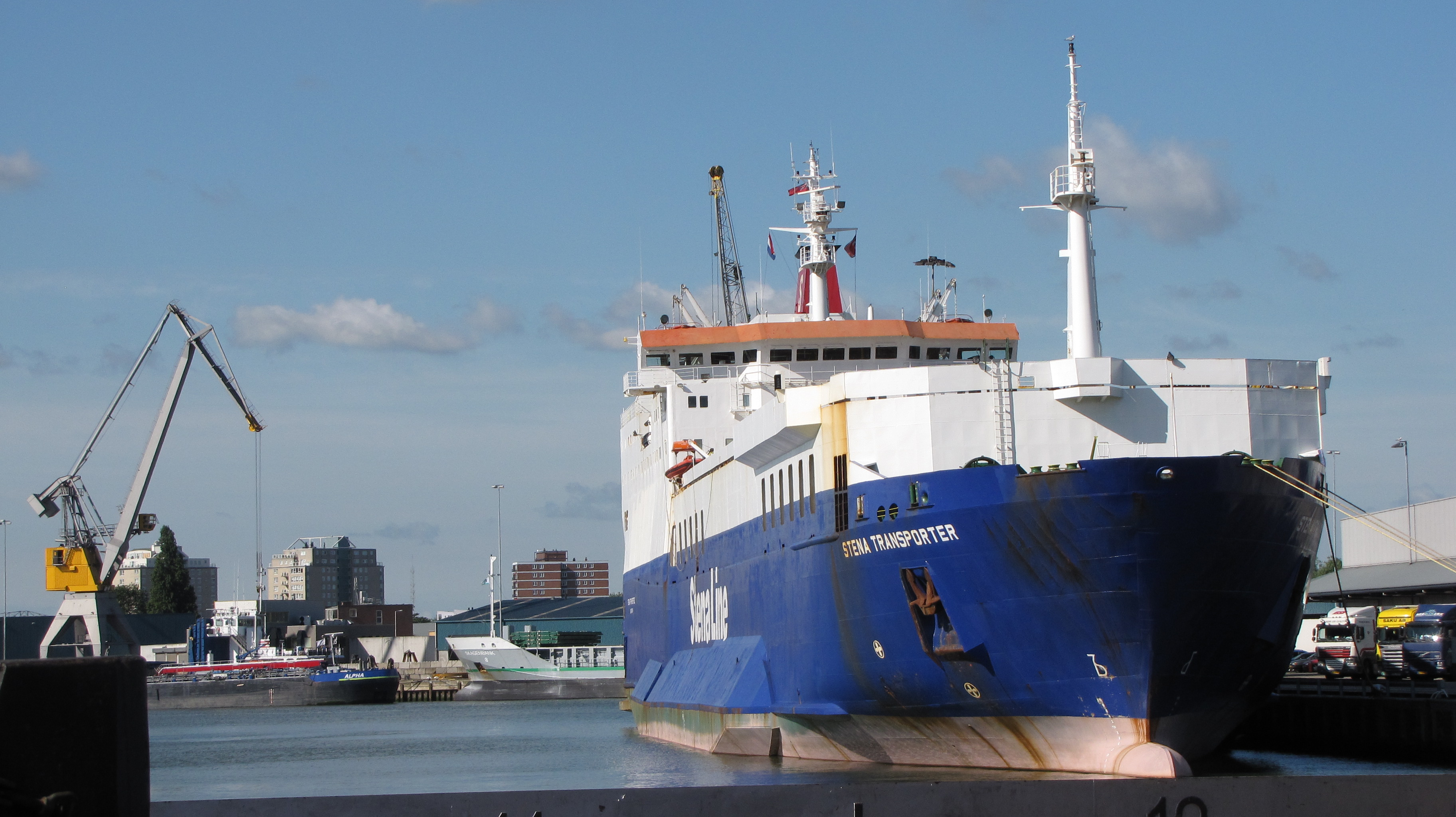
Stena Transporter in Rotterdam June 2009

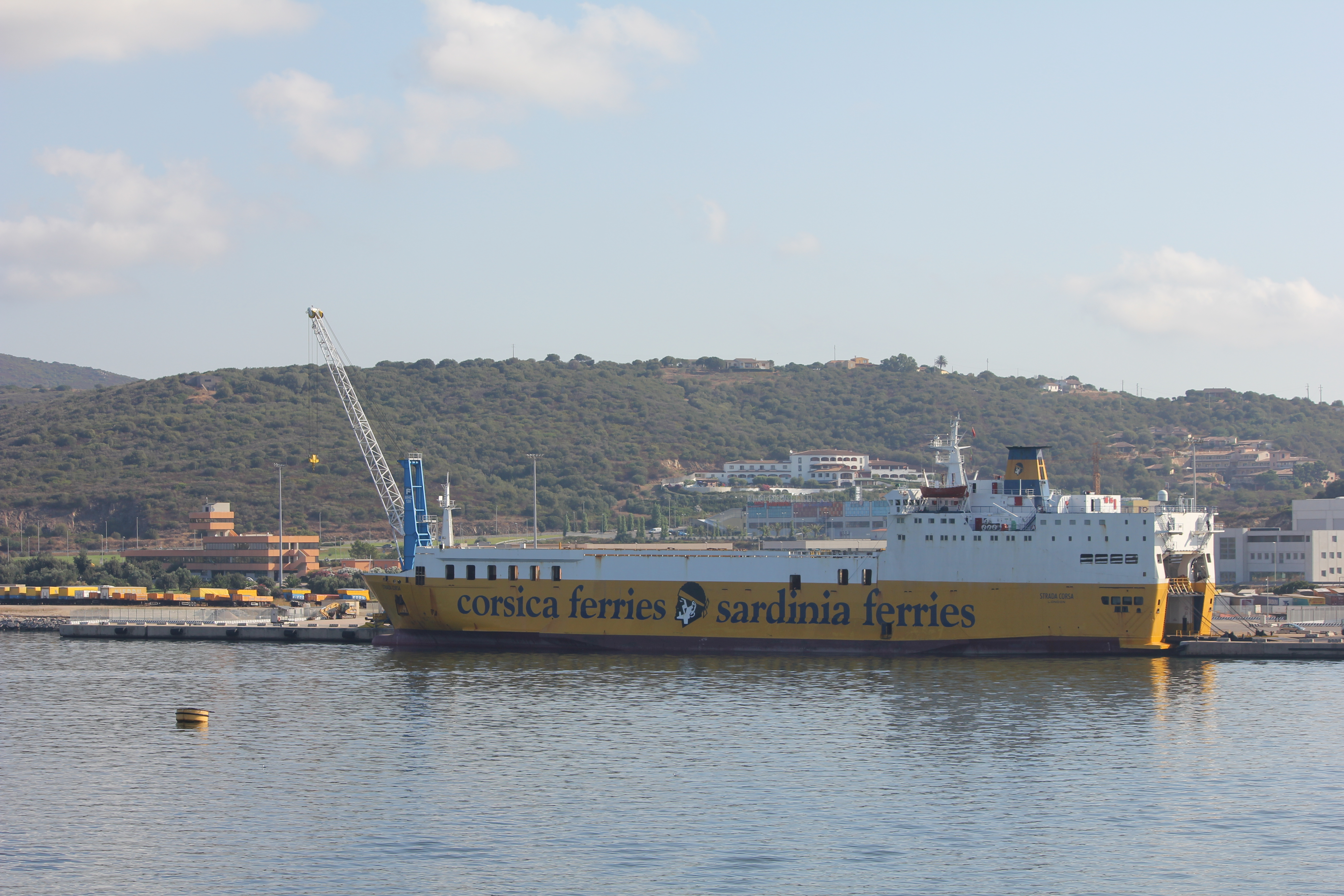
As Strada Corsa in Olbia August 2013

After the war Nordic Ferry continued on the Felixstowe–Europoort route. In 1985–86 she underwent a £5 million refit at the Wilton-Fijenoord shipyard in Schiedam, the Netherlands, to fit her for combined passenger and freight use. She had 27 additional cabins installed, bringing her passenger capacity up to 124. Nordic Ferry afterwards replaced MS Super Viking on the Felixstowe–Zeebrugge route. She was assessed at 18,732 GRT, 10,578 NRT, 8,704 DWT. Townsend Thoresen was rebranded as P&O European Ferries in 1987. On 4 February 1987, Nordic Ferry collided with the vessel San Salvador while travelling towards Felixstowe. The subsequent investigation found that San Salvador had proceeded at an unsafe speed of 6.5 knots (12.0 km/h; 7.5 mph) given she had an inoperable radar and visibility of only 50 feet (15 m) in poor weather. Although Nordic Ferry was proceeding faster, at 7–8 knots (13–15 km/h; 8.1–9.2 mph), her speed was ruled safe given she was fitted with two excellent radar sets, had a high level of manoeuvrability and an experienced crew. Nordic Ferry was renamed Pride of Flanders by 1993 and in November 1995 was refitted at Harland and Wolff in Belfast to maximise her freight capacity. Following the refit, she was assessed at 16,776 GT, 8,704 DWT. Her beam and depth were now 23.50 metres (77 ft 1 in) and 7.27 metres (23 ft 10 in) respectively.

Pride of Flanders was sold to Stena Line in 2002 and her name shortened to Flanders, she was later renamed Stena Transporter. In June 2009 she was sold to Strade Blu and served on their Livorno to Olbia, Sardinia route, being renamed Strada Corsa. She was sold again in October 2013 to Baja Ferries and was sailed to the Pacific to service their La Paz to Topolobampo and Mazatlán routes in Mexico, during which time she was named La Paz Star. Sold to Medferry Shipping in December 2016 she returned to Europe, traversing the Panama Canal in January 2017 and passing Gibraltar in February. Renamed Med Star, a major refit was carried out to her car decks and stern ramp. She afterwards served on the Rhodes to Santorini route in Greece under charter to Blue Star Ferries and sailing under the Cypriot flag. Having loaded 33 vehicles at Rhodes on 15 June 2017 she suffered a fire in her engine room that spread to the accommodation block. Twenty of her passengers and crew were evacuated in a lifeboat and, after the remaining twelve crew managed to extinguish the fire, Med Star was towed to Rhodes. She was transferred to the Spanopoulos repair yard in Perama but repairs proved uneconomic. Renamed Star and sailing under the Sierra Leonean flag, she was beached at Aliağa, Turkey, for breaking on 8 December 2017. At the time of scrapping her length was measured at 151 metres (495 ft).

== Bibliography ==
- Ambrose, A. J. (1983). Jane's Merchant Shipping Review. Jane's. ISBN 978-0-86720-663-0.
- Brown, David (1987). The Royal Navy and The Falklands War. Pen and Sword. ISBN 978-1-4738-1779-1.
- Burtles, Jim (2013). Emergency Evacuation Planning for Your Workplace: From Chaos to Life-Saving Solutions. Rothstein Publishing. ISBN 978-1-931332-56-9.
- "Ferry Med Star" (PDF). Shipbreaking: Bulletin of Information and Analysis on Ship Demolition (50). 15 February 2018.
- Marsden, Reginald Godfrey; Gault, Simon; Hazelwood, Steven J.; Tettenborn, A. M. (2003). Marsden on Collisions at Sea. Sweet & Maxwell. ISBN 978-0-421-68400-3.
- Institute of Marine Engineers (1985). MER: Marine Engineers Review.
- Lloyd's Register of Shipping (1993). Register of Ships.
- The Motor Ship. Vol. 67. Temple Press. 1986.
- Thomas, David (1998). Battles and Honours of the Royal Navy. Pen and Sword. ISBN 978-0-85052-623-3.
- Privratsky, Kenneth L. (2014). Logistics in the Falklands War. Barnsley, South Yorkshire: Pen and Sword Books. ISBN 978-1-47382-312-9. OCLC 890938195.
- Sea Breezes:The Magazine of Ships and the Sea. Vol. 70. London: Charles Birchall & Sons. 1996.
- Villar, Captain Roger (1984). Merchant Ships at War: The Falklands Experience. London: Conway Maritime Press and Lloyd's of London Press. ISBN 0851772986.
