= MV Pelagitis =

Ferry

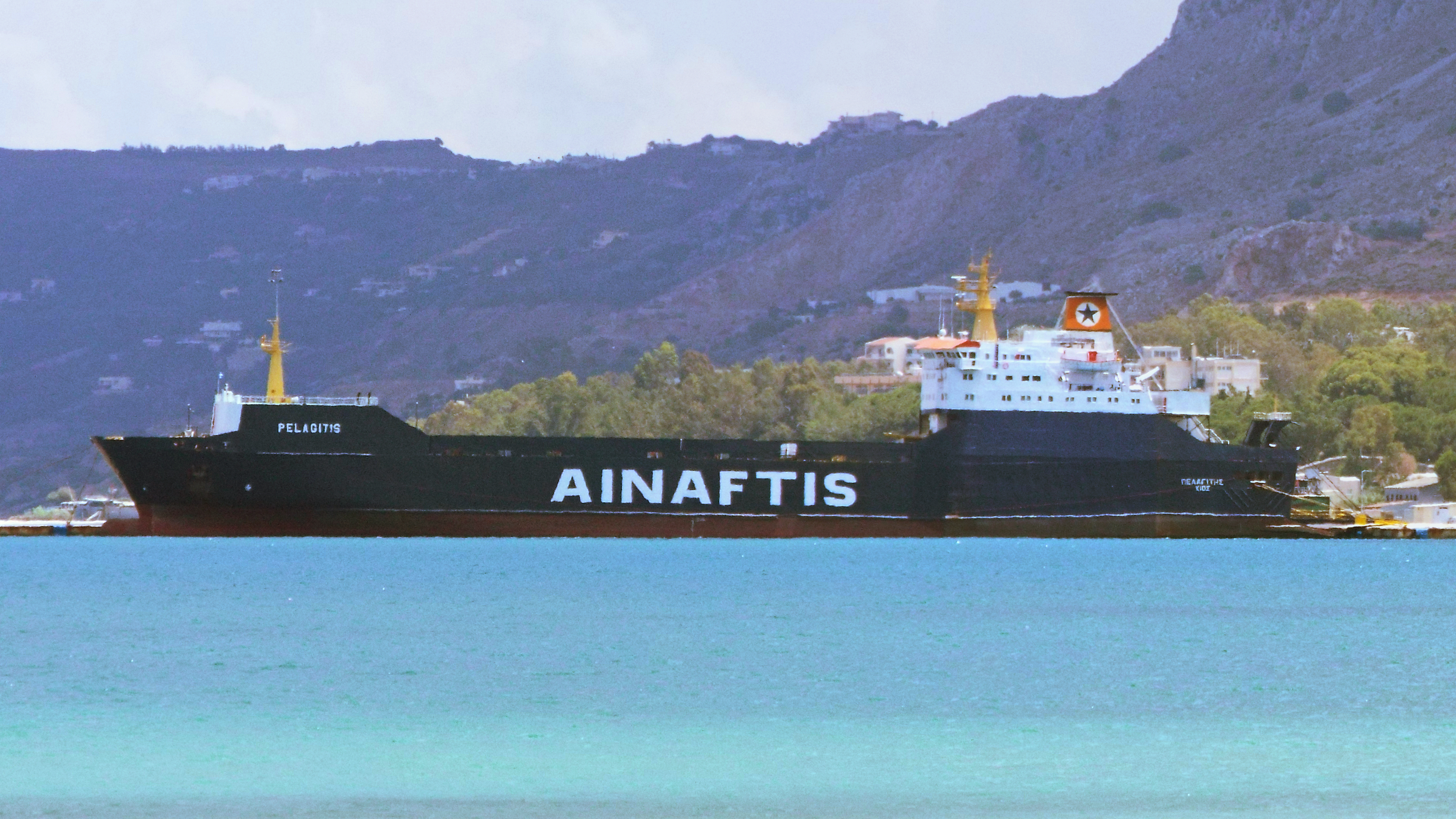
- Ro-Ro Cargo Storno in Souda (Crete)

History
- Name: Storno (2025- 2026); "Pelagitis" (2011-2025); Atlantic Freighter (1987–2010); Stena Grecia (1983–1987); Merzario Grecia (1978–1983); Tor Felicia (1978)
- Owner: Togo Cargo F. (2025-2026) Ainaftis (2010-2025) Stena Line (1978–1987)
- Operator: Togo Cargo Ferries
- Port of registry: Togo (2025-2026); Greece (2010-2025); Bahamas (1978–1987)
- Builder: Hyundai Heavy Industries; Ulsan, South Korea
- Yard number: 647
- Launched: 22 December 1977
- Completed: 1978
- Out of service: 2024 (laid up until late 2025, then scrapped in January 2026)
- Identification: Call sign: SVBC8; IMO number: 7528611; MMSI number: 241053000

General characteristics
- Tonnage: 5,466 GT; 3,995 NT; 8,661 DWT
- Length: 154 m (505 ft); 143 m (469 ft)
- Beam: 21.67 m (71.1 ft)
- Draught: 7.319 m (24.01 ft)
- Ramps: Stern loading; shore based
- Installed power: Two NKK-Pielstick diesel engines; 11,638 kW (combined)
- Propulsion: Two propellers Bow thruster (1,000 hp)
- Speed: 15 knots (28 km/h; 17 mph)
- Capacity: 12 passengers; 75 drop trailers (plus tank top)

MV Storno was a roll-on/roll-off (Ro-Ro) ferry formerly operated by Marine Atlantic from North Sydney, Nova Scotia to Channel-Port aux Basques, Newfoundland, Canada. The vessel was completed in 1978 by Hyundai Shipbuilding Company Limited in and delivered to the Stena Line which operates in Northern Europe. She was sold on 12 March 2010 and given her current name Pelagitis. In 2025 AINAFTIS sold the ship to Togo Cargo Ferries in 2025 and has the name Storno. The vessel was scrapped in Turkey at the beginning of 2026.

Throughout her career, the vessel sailed under the names Atlantic Freighter, Merzario Grecia, Stena Grecia, and Tor Felicia.

== Operation ==
Loading and unloading the vessel each take over three hours. Eight trailers are loaded at one time using a "yard tractor train system". The vessel represented 19.6 percent of Marine Atlantic's fleet in 2005.

== Asbestos risk ==
In 1990 asbestos was found in use on the vessel. Management made the decision to encapsulate the asbestos. In November 2007, 60 workers on Atlantic Freighter were told they should be tested for asbestos exposure.

== Gulf War service ==
Atlantic Freighter was chartered by the United States Military Sealift Command in December 1990, and served two supply missions to the Persian Gulf during the Gulf War. The vessel was captained by Neil Hillier, and crewed by 25 volunteers. Fisheries and Oceans Minister, Fred Mifflin was credited with five years of efforts to secure the right for the crew to wear the United States Merchant Marine Expeditionary Award.
