= Stena Europe =

Vehicle and passenger ferry operated by Stena Line

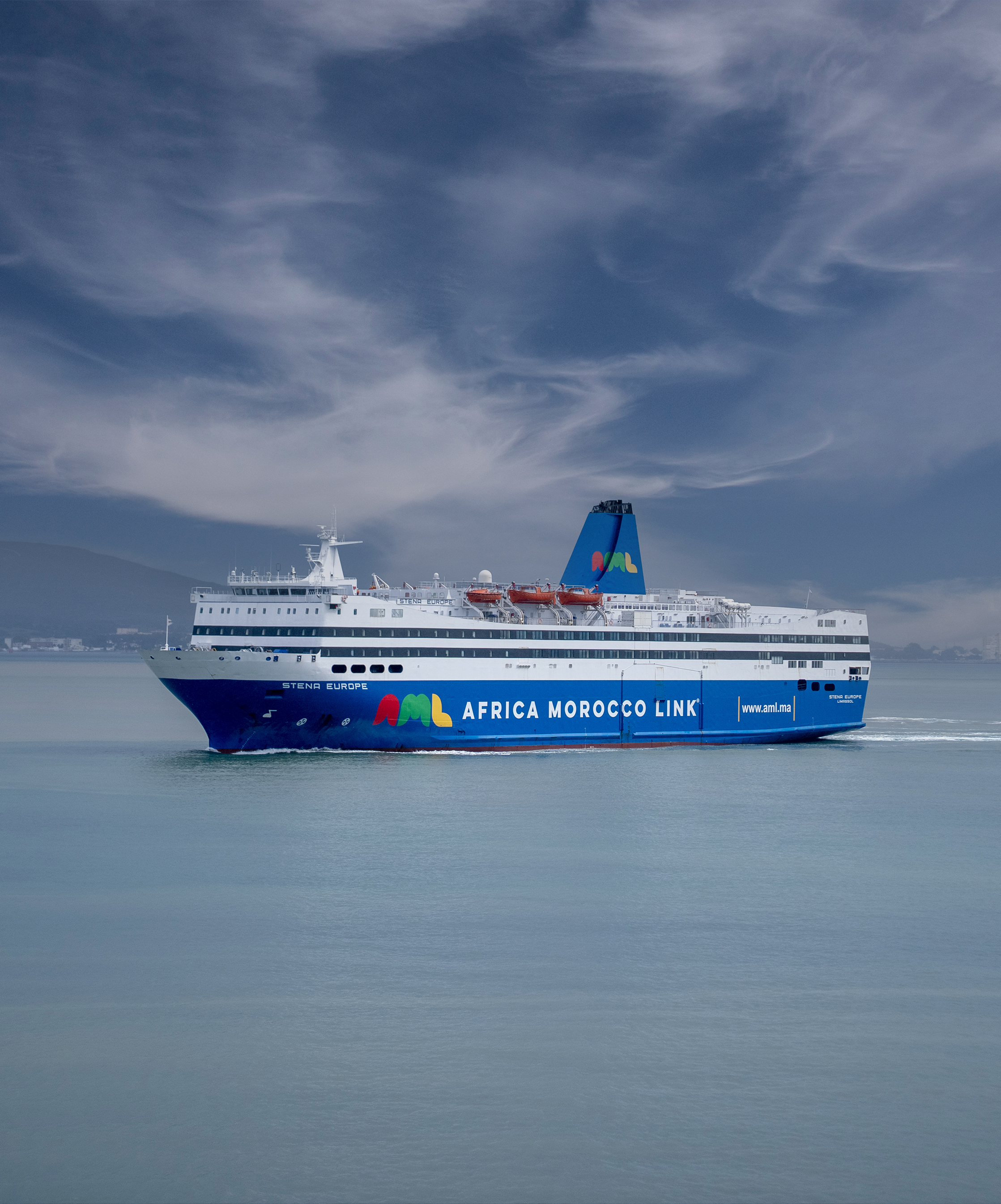
- Stena Europe in the Strait of Gibraltar

History
- Name: 1980-1988: Kronprinsessan Victoria; 1988-1994: Stena Saga; 1994-1997: Stena Europe; 1997-1998: Lion Europe; 1998 onwards: Stena Europe
- Owner: 1981-1982: Sessanlinjen; 1982 onwards: Stena Line
- Operator: 1981-1997: Stena Line; 1997-1998: Lion Ferry; 1998 onwards: Stena Line
- Port of registry: 2023-onwards Limassol Cyprus; 2002-2023: Fishguard UK; 2000-2002: Nassau Bahamas; 1997-2000: Gdansk Poland; 1997: Nassau Bahamas; 1981-1997: Göteborg Sweden
- Route: Algeciras - Tanger Med
- Launched: 15 October 1980
- In service: 1981
- Identification: IMO number: 7901760
- Status: In service

General characteristics
- Class & type: Ro-Ro Pax
- Tonnage: 24,828 GRT
- Length: 149.05 m (489 ft 0 in)
- Beam: 26.55 m (87 ft 1 in)
- Draught: 6.12 m (20 ft 1 in)
- Decks: 10
- Ramps: 4 Ramps
- Installed power: 4 × Wärtsilä, combined 15,360 kW
- Speed: 20.5 knots (37.97 km/h; 23.59 mph)
- Capacity: 1,386 passengers; 452 berths; 456 cars; 1,120 lane meters

Stena Europe is a ferry owned by Stena Line which operates between Algeciras and Tanger Med; under charter to Africa Morocco Link.

She was built in 1980 by Götaverken, Gothenburg, Sweden, and first entered service in 1981 as MS Kronprinsessan Victoria for Sessanlinjen.

== Concept and Construction ==
The ship, along with her sister, Prinsessan Birgitta, was originally ordered from Götaverken on 15 February 1979 by Sessanlinjen, Sweden. The two ships were to replace much smaller vessels on the route and were seen as a way for Sessanlinjen to compete with their main rival Stena Line.

Whilst the ships were built at Arendal, this had not been the intention when planning the new builds. Sessanlinjen managing director; Ulf Trapp had originally approached Aalborg Værft in Denmark to collaborate on the design of the new ships. Aalborg Værft had previously designed and built several of the company's previous ships since the early 1960s and the collaboration resulted in a design which could carry 2,100 passengers (400 cabin berths) and 700 cars, including a large Copa Room-style tiered show lounge; the first of their kind on a new-build passenger ship. During the 1970s there was a downturn in the Swedish shipbuilding industries, with few new ships being ordered from Swedish shipyards. The Swedish Government intervened offering subsidies and encouragement to ferry companies to build their new tonnage in Sweden (the Finnish and Danish governments had similar schemes at the time also). As a result of these subsidies, when it was time to place the order for Sessanlinjen's new ships, the order went to the Arendal Shipyard of Götaverken instead of Aalborg Værft, as Sessanlinjen had perhaps originally anticipated.

Given the level of government subsidies which were given to secure the order, the Swedish Government were closely involved in the process and the subsidies were conditional on Sessanlinjen being able to demonstrate financial stability. The suggestion of reviving an earlier collaboration with Stena Line was rebuffed by Sten A. Olsson and resulted in Stena Line ordering their own new ships for the same route. Shortly after, 26% of Sessanlinjen was purchased by Tor Line and Sessan Tor Line was formed to operate services by both companies, which improved the financial standing of Sessanlinjen to such a degree that funding was granted for one of their new build ships, with negotiations between Stena Line and Sessan Tor Line resulting in both agreeing to forgo one new ship each and form a jointly owned company to market both companies traffic on the Gothenburg-Frederikshavn route. Funding approval in August 1980 for the second ship saw this agreement collapse, putting both companies on track for an estimated combined loss of 150 million Krone in 1982.

At the time of the order, the Sessanlinjen ships were planned not only to be the largest ferries on their routes, but to be among the largest ferries in the world and with the ships having planned delivery dates in 1981, this attracted rival Stena Line's renewed attention. Stena Line's own pair of new ships (Stena Danica and Stena Jutlandica) for the Gothenburg-Frederikshavn route, were experiencing construction delays at the Chantiers de France-Dunkerque (later Chantiers du Nord et de la Mediterranee) shipyard, and this meant their ships would not enter service until 1983, giving Sessanlinjen the chance to gain a two year advantage over Stena. Stena's solution was to purchase the majority of shares in Sessanlinjen, leading to the formation of Stena Sessan Line.

Stena's takeover of Sessanlinjen was approved at extraordinary general meeting of Sessanlinjen in January 1981 after Stena had acquired all the shares in Sessan that were available to purchase, and this resulted in a vote to terminate the agreement with Tor Line from 1 March 1981. Both Stena and Sessanlinjen presented the takeover in a positive light, but Tor Line sued Sessanlinjen for breach of contract, which ended in a small compensation settlement being awarded to Tor Line. Kronprinsessan Victoria was actually delivered with the words 'Sessan Tor Line' still painted on the side of the ship, but this was quickly painted over leaving a slightly odd spacing arrangement, before decoration in Stena Line livery.

The takeover by Stena also addressed two other concerns which had been circulating at the time; namely the financial situation of Sessanlinjen, and therefore their ability to pay for their two ships, and the overcapacity that would have been created with four new ferries entering service between Gothenburg-Frederikshavn at largely the same time (two for Sessanlinjen and two for Stena).

The difference between the orders placed by Sessanlinjen and Stena illustrate the different financial situations of the companies. Sessanlinjen's two ships were designed with flexibility in mind, and by specifying the 400 cabin berths and multi-functional arrangements to the main passenger spaces, the ships would also be suitable for deployment on the overnight sailings on the Gothenburg-Travemünde route. Stena on the other hand ordered Stena Danica and Stena Jutlandica with only a few cabins below the car deck, as they were designed solely for daytime sailings Gothenburg-Frederikshavn route, whilst also at the same time ordering four overnight ferries for other routes. Ironically, these four ships; Stena Germanica, Stena Scandinavica, Stena Polonica and Stena Baltica also encountered major delays while under construction at Stocznia Gdynia, Poland, with the latter two being cancelled (and sold to other operators) and the former two swapping names upon their eventual delivery in 1986/7 having been ordered in 1979.

== Service ==
=== Early career ===
Due to the delay in delivery of the Stena Danica; Kronprisessan Victoria was used as a day ferry on the Gothenburg - Frederikshavn route until March 1982 (when Stena Danica was eventually delivered) at which point she was converted to a night ferry for the Gothenburg - Kiel route. This involved building a large numbers of additional cabins onto the upper vehicle deck to make her suitable as an overnight ship.

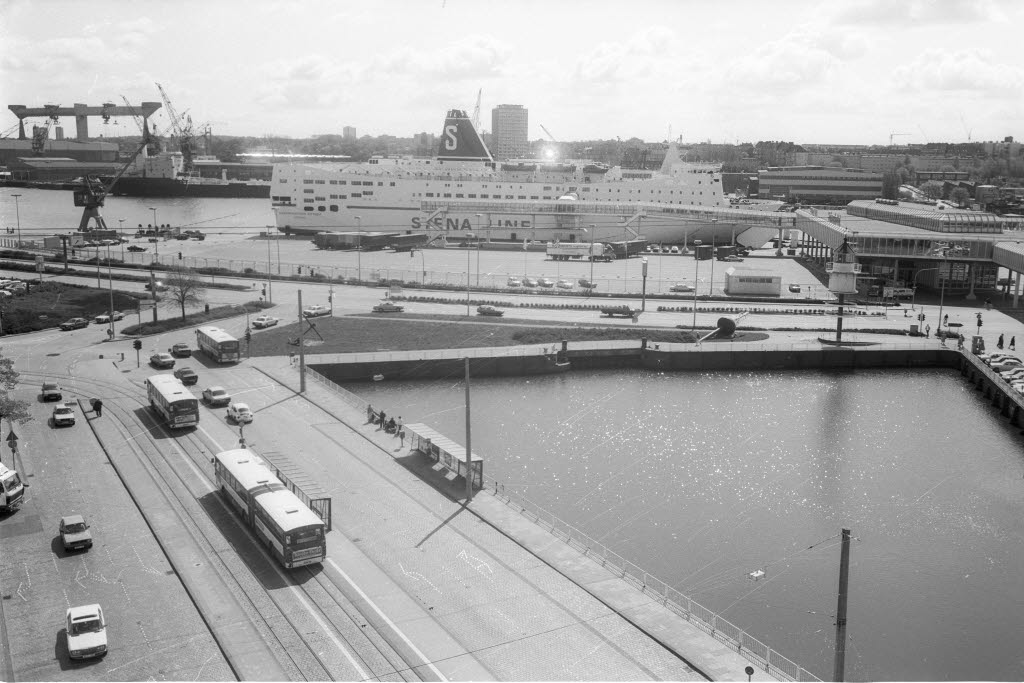
Kronprinsessan Victoria in Kiel, April 1984

In 1988, Kronprinsessan Victoria was sent for rebuilding to make her more suitable for use on the Oslo - Fredrikshavn route, this involved building more cabins which saw an accommodation block added on the top deck. Kronprisessan Victoria was renamed Stena Saga prior to entering service on the Oslo - Fredrikshavn route.

The vessel was transferred to the Hook of Holland - Harwich route in 1994. Stena Saga was refitted prior to transfer; this mainly involved removing the accommodation block that was added to the top deck in 1988. The vessel was then renamed Stena Europe. Following the introduction of the Stena Discovery on the Hook of Holland - Harwich route in June 1997, the Stena Europe was withdrawn from the route. She was transferred to Stena Line's subsidiary Lion Ferry as Lion Europe entering service on the Karlskrona - Gdynia route. In 1998 all Lion Ferry routes and vessel were transferred to the Stena Line banner. Following this she reverted to the name Stena Europe. Between 1997 and 2001, she served on Stena Line's Karlskrona - Gdynia route.

=== Transfer to the Irish Sea ===
In late 2001 Stena Line announced that the Koningin Beatrix and Stena Europe would swap routes in early 2002. In January 2002 Stena Europe entered the City Shipyard at Gothenburg to undergo a GBP4.5 million refit. All the main passenger lounges were refurbished and the cabins installed on the upper vehicle deck in 1982 were removed returning the latter to something like their original state. With freight capacity fully restored the vessel is once again very much a day ferry. Following berthing trials the MS Stena Europe entered service on its new route on 13 March 2002.

Stena Europe has proved a popular ship on the Fishguard - Rosslare route. She shared Rosslare for a time with her sister ship, MS Normandy, that was then operating Irish Ferries' services to France. She also shared the Fishguard - Rosslare route with the Stena Lynx III during the summer months until the end of Summer 2011 when Stena Lynx III ceased operating the route.

In June 2005 Stena Europe covered on the Holyhead - Dublin route for eleven days while Stena Adventurer was on annual overhaul. In November 2008 Stena Europe received an €850,000 refurbishment to some of its main passenger lounges. In 2011 the Stena Europe was off service twice, once for overhaul in January and again in April for the replacement of an engine in Falmouth. Stena Europe went for annual refit in late January 2012 and returned to service on 3 February 2012. In March 2019, Stena Europe arrived at Gemak's Tuzla yard in Turkey for life extension work returning to her usual Fishguard - Rosslare route in early October.

=== Later years ===
On 13 July 2023 she was replaced on the Rosslare to Fishguard route by the Stena Nordica. The following day she left Rosslare and the Irish Sea for the very last time bound for dry dock in Falmouth before going to the western Mediterranean on charter. Stena Europe was on charter to Intershipping operating the Algeciras to Tanger Med route from August to 15 September 2023. She was then laid up between Algeciras and Gibraltar both alongside and at anchor until 28 November 2023. She then departed for Falmouth.

== Incidents ==
- In January 2003 Stena Europe was in the news when she lost power near Tuskar Rock, just off the Irish coast. Five helicopters were scrambled to winch 155 passengers to safety, but the rescue was aborted as engineers brought the ship back under her own power.
- On 6 June 2009, the ferry was called to assist in the rescue of a sailor that had fallen overboard from another vessel in the Irish Sea. The incident happened during the ship’s regular journey from Rosslare to Fishguard.
- On the evening of 26 October 2012, Stena Line reported on Facebook that a minor incident occurred at Rosslare Port involving Stena Europe and the Irish Ferries Oscar Wilde vessel. The 454 passengers and 71 crew on board were said to be safe, although the return crossing to Fishguard was cancelled.
- On the evening of 11 February 2023 a fire was reported in the Engine Room of the vessel whilst en-route to Fishguard from Rosslare. The vessel was able to reach the berth with assistance from local tug boats where fire crews from Mid & West Wales Fire & Rescue Service boarded the vessel. However, the crew had already extinguished the blaze. The UK's Marine Accident Investigation Branch determined that the cause was fuel leaking from a loose pipe onto a hot exhaust. It found the fire protection systems were inadequate and the crew were not trained to monitor the exhaust insulation for hot-spots.
