= GNV Blu =

1986 roll-on/roll-off ferry

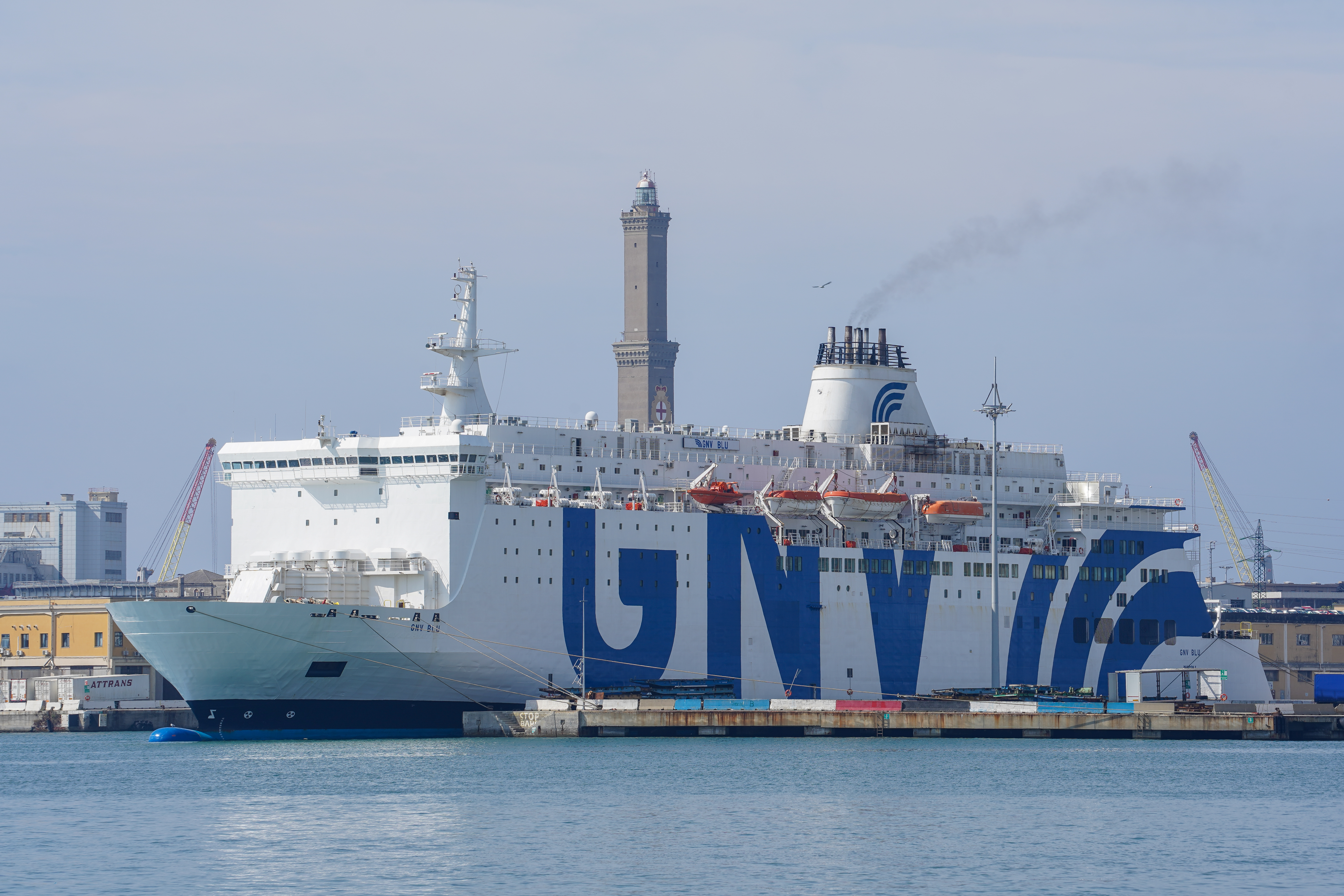
- GNV Blu in Genoa

History
- Name: 1986–2002: Koningin Beatrix; 2002–2013: Stena Baltica; 2013–2022: SNAV Adriatico; 2022–present: GNV Blu
- Operator: 1986–1989: SMZ; 1989–2013: Stena Line; 2013–2014: SNAV; 2014: Ferry Xpress; 2015–2018: Acciona Trasmediterránea; 2018–present: Grandi Navi Veloci
- Port of registry: 1986–1997: Hook of Holland, Netherlands; 1997–2002: London, United Kingdom; 2002–2013: Nassau, Bahamas; 2013: Limassol, Cyprus; 2013–present: Naples, Italy
- Route: Palma de Mallorca - Valencia
- Builder: Van der Giessen de Noord
- Yard number: 935
- Laid down: 5 January 1985
- Launched: 9 November 1985
- Christened: 9 November 1985 by Beatrix of the Netherlands
- Completed: 1986
- Acquired: 22 April 1986
- Maiden voyage: April 1986
- Identification: Call sign: IBEA; IMO number: 8416308; MMSI number: 247334600
- Status: In service

General characteristics
- Type: Cruiseferry
- Tonnage: 31,910 GT
- Length: 164.61 m (540 ft 1 in)
- Installed power: 4 × MAN 8L 40/45 diesel engines
- Speed: 20 knots (37 km/h; 23 mph)
- Capacity: 1,200 passengers; 524 vehicles

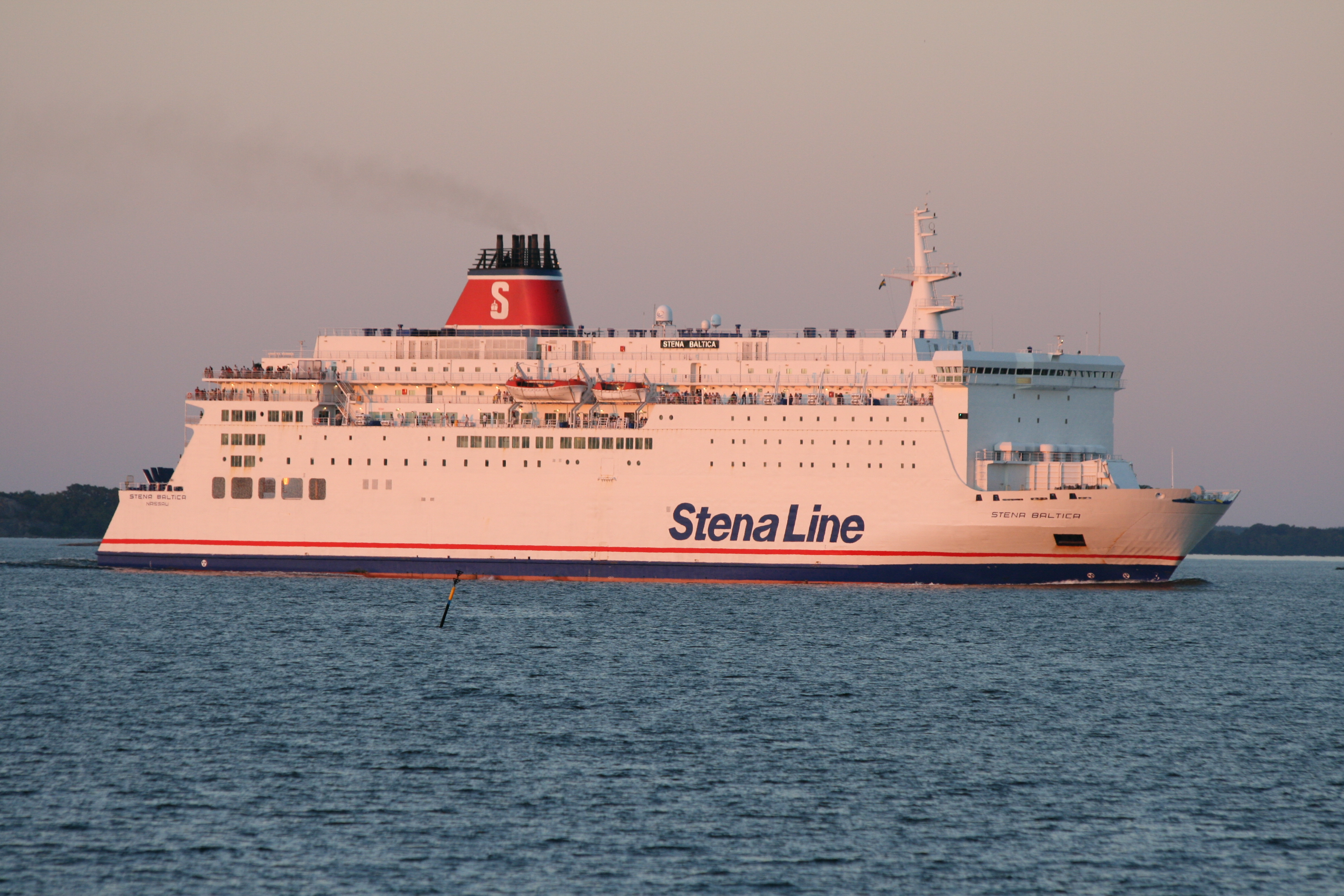
As Stena Baltica

GNV Blu is a roll-on/roll-off ferry currently operated by Grandi Navi Veloci. She used to be owned by Stena Line and operated on the Karlskrona–Gdynia service. She was built in 1986 by Van der Giessen de Noord as MS Koningin Beatrix for SMZ. In 1989 she passed under Stena Line's ownership and in 2002 was renamed Stena Baltica. In 2013 she was sold to SNAV. On 23 October 2014, SNAV leased the ship to Panamanian company Ferry Xpress Panama to start operations on the Colon – Cartagena – Colon and Colon – Bocas del Toro – Colon routes. Since 2015 the vessel is operated by Trasmediterránea, and is currently used by Grandi Navi Veloci to serve the Bari–Durrës route.

She was built to a similar design to the SNAV Lazio, SNAV Sardegna, Princess of Norway and King of Scandinavia.

== History ==
The GNV Blu was built in 1986 by Van der Giessen de Noord as the Koningin Beatrix. It entered service the same year sailing between Hook of Holland and Harwich for SMZ. In 1989 Stena Line took over the route. She remained on that route until 1997 when she was replaced by the Stena Discovery.

Following the arrival of the Stena Discovery the Koningin Beatrix was transferred to the Fishguard – Rosslare route, replacing the Stena Felicity. She remained on the Fishguard – Rosslare Harbour route until 2002, when it was replaced by former Stena Line BV fleetmate Stena Europe.

In 2003 the Koningin Beatrix was transferred to the Karlskrona – Gdynia route and renamed Stena Baltica.

In 2005 the Stena Baltica was rebuilt at the Remontowa yard. The SEK 235 million. investment included the refurbishment of the passenger facilities on decks 7, 8 and 9. A new vehicle deck was created from stripping the cabin accommodation on decks 5 and 6. Externally, a large vehicle door and ramp was constructed at the bow and number of lifeboats were removed.

The Stena Baltica and her running partner MS Finnarrow were replaced on the Karlskrona – Gdynia route in 2010 by the Stena Vision and Stena Spirit. The ship was laid up at Lysekil. On 24 January 2013, Stena announced the sale of the ship to SNAV. In February 2013 the ship was transferred to SNAV, renamed SNAV Adriatico, and started the service by operating the route Ancona–Split.

In 2014, SNAV Adriatico left SNAV service and was chartered to the Panamanian company, Ferry Xpress for services between Colon – Cartagena – Colon and Colon – Bocas del Toro – Colon. She left the service in late 2014/early 2015 where she departed for Europe, shortly after arriving at Naples on 12 May, she left bound for Barcelona on 21 May 2015 where the vessel arrived two days later. She arrived in Barcelona prior to a charter to Acciona Trasmediterránea to replace the burnt out Sorrento, which caught fire in May 2015. The vessel was due to sail between Palma de Mallorca and Valencia.

From 2018 to 2020, the ship operated on the Naples–Palermo route for Grandi Navi Veloci. Since 3 September 2020, the vessel is chartered by the Italian Ministry of the Interior to be used as a quarantine ship in the landings emergency in Sicily. GNV Blu operates on the Bari–Durrës route.
