= MS Stena Britannica =

MS Stena Britannica may refer to:

- Stena Britannica (built 1967) - Broken up in 2001
- Stena Britannica (built 1981) - Now Stena Saga with Stena Line
- Stena Britannica (built 2000) - Now Finnfellow with Finnlines
- Stena Britannica (built 2003) - Now Stena Scandinavica with Stena Line
- Stena Britannica (built 2010) - Current Stena Britannica with Stena Line
