= MV Regent Sky =

Former unfinished cruise ship

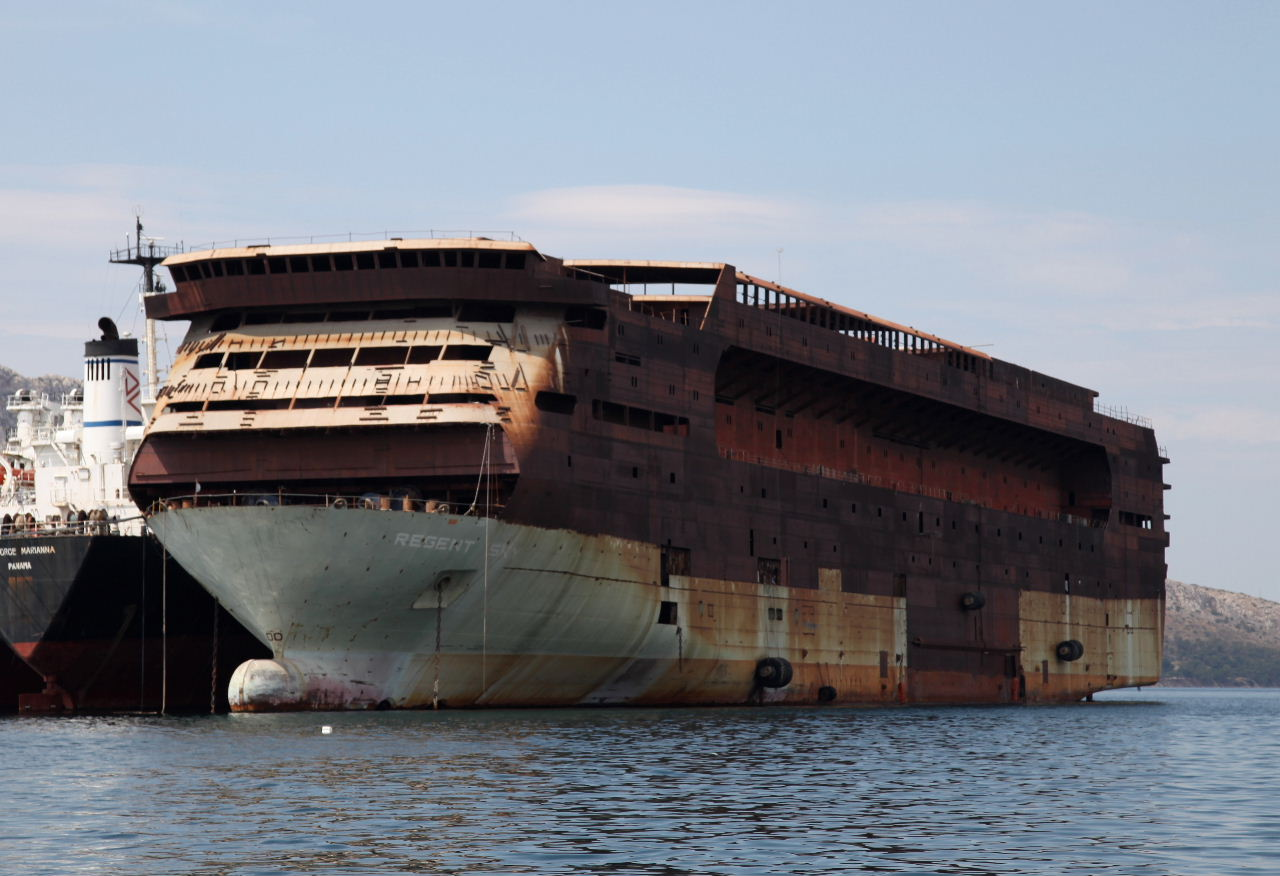
- The Regent Sky laid up at Eleusis in 2009

History
- Name: 1984–1990: Stena Baltica; 1990–2009: Regent Sky; 2009–2012: Zoe
- Owner: 1984–1989: Stena Line (planned); 1989–1996: Regency Cruises; 1996–1999: Bank of Greece; 1999–2004: Sea Nomad Maritime; 2004–2011: Prince Nomad
- Port of registry: Greece (1996–2011?); Comoros (2011)
- Builder: Stocznia Gdanska SA, Gdansk
- Yard number: B494/04
- Laid down: 1985
- Launched: 16 October 1990
- In service: 1997/98 (planned)
- Identification: IMO number: 7907685
- Fate: Scrapped in 2012
- Notes: Beached for scrap on 16 July 2012

General characteristics
- Tonnage: 55,000 tons
- Length: 174.9 meters (1986); 228 meters (1990)
- Beam: 27.7 meters
- Draught: 6.7 meters
- Capacity: 1,600 passengers (planned)

MV Regent Sky was an unfinished cruise ship that travelled to several locations during her incomplete construction. She was initially being built in Poland as the cruise ferry Stena Baltica, one of four sister ships planned for the Stena Line. Still incomplete, she was purchased by Regency Cruises and moved to Greece, but her new owners filed for bankruptcy in 1995.

The unfinished ship was sold for scrap in July 2011.

== History ==
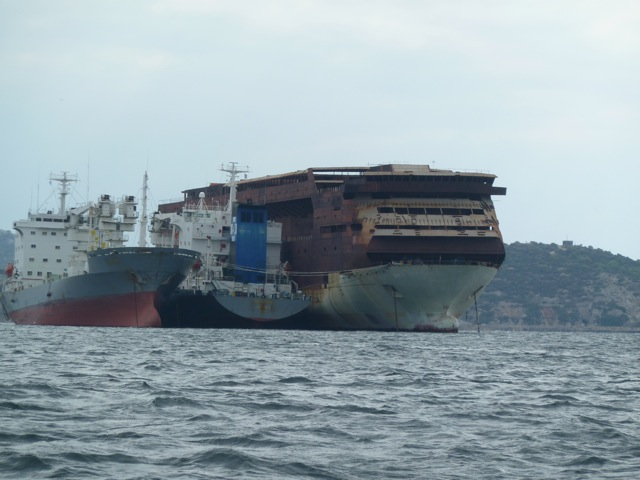
Regent Sky laid up at Elefsis

Regent Sky was originally ordered in 1979 and laid down in 1985 under the name Stena Baltica. She was one of four fairly identical cruise ferries being built by Stocznia im Lenina, in Gdańsk, a Polish seaport on the Baltic coast, for Stena Line, Stena Germanica, Stena Scandinavica and Stena Polonica. In 1986, her construction was cancelled (and her sisters delayed) because of problems with the shipyard.

The unfinished hull was purchased in 1989 by A. Lelakis, owner of Regency Cruises. Regency planned to put her into service as their first new ship, having previously purchased and converted ocean liners. Stena Baltica was towed to the Avlis Shipyards at Perama, Greece (also owned by Lelakis), where a US$200 million process to convert her into a cruise ship began. The vessel was renamed Regent Sky at this time, and 7,000 tons of steel were installed after she was lengthened 50 meters at Elefsis Shipyards in Greece.

In 1995, while Regent Sky was at the Avlis Shipyards of Chalkis, Greece and about 60% finished, Regency Cruises ceased operations. The vessel was seized by the National Bank of Greece and Hellenic Industrial Development Bank in July 1999. Since then, Regent Sky moved from one lay up berth to another, including Perama, Ambelakia and then Kinossoura. All attempts to sell the vessel at auction failed. The Regent Sky was later moved to anchorage off Eleusis, Greece, until July 2011 when she was sold for scrapping. This ship, the longest-lived passenger liner that was never completed, finally arrived for demolition in Aliaga, Turkey on 16 July 2012.

== Condition ==
A rendering of Regent Sky as Zoe

After her construction was halted, Regent Sky rusted heavily. During her conversion Wärtsilä main engines were installed. After the bankruptcy of Regency, the engines were removed, leaving Regent Sky unpowered. The foremost part of her bow was never completed. There were several renderings of the completed ship, with one depicting her as Zoe, sporting a white hull and red funnel.
