= Stena Baltica =

Ship built in 2005

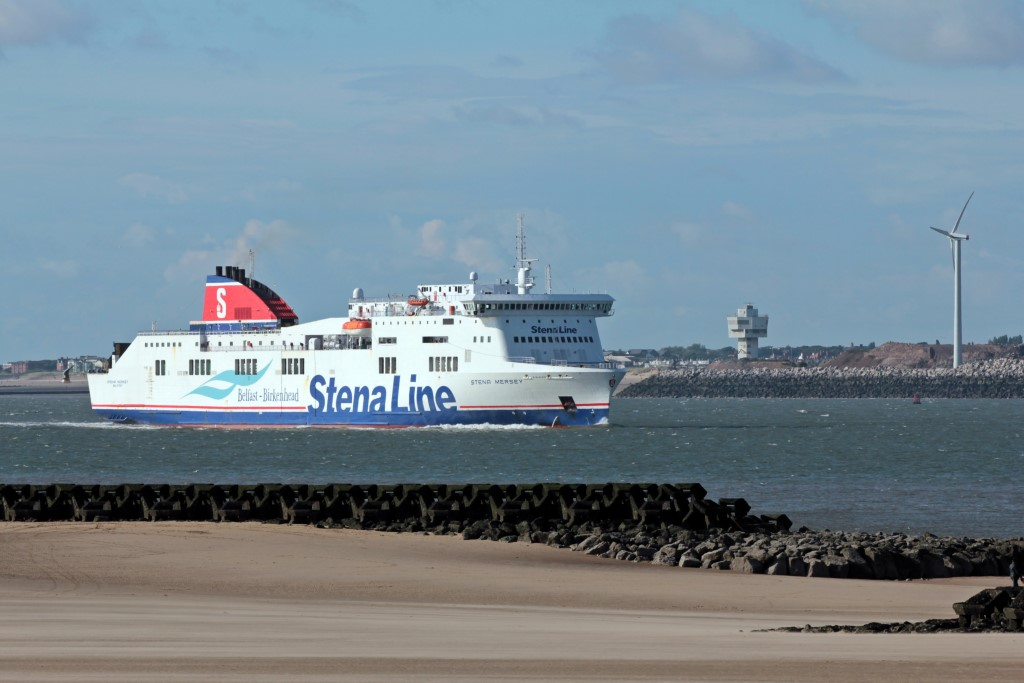
- Stena Mersey, seen from New Brighton, entering the River Mersey in 2015.

History
- Name: 2005–2010: Mersey Viking; 2010–2011: Mersey Seaways; 2011–2021: Stena Mersey; 2021–: Stena Baltica
- Owner: 2005–2012: Levantina Trasporti Srl; 2012–: Stena Ropax Ltd
- Operator: 2005–2006: Norse Merchant Ferries; 2006–2010: Norfolkline; 2010–2010: DFDS Seaways; Dec 2010–: Stena Line
- Port of registry: 2005–2008: Bari, Italy; 2008–2021: Belfast, United Kingdom; 2021–present: Hellerup, Denmark
- Route: Birkenhead–Belfast (2005–2021); Nynäshamn–Ventspils (2021–)
- Builder: Cantiere Navale Visentini
- Yard number: 213
- Launched: 2 July 2005
- Completed: December 2005
- Maiden voyage: December 2005
- Identification: IMO number: 9329851; MMSI number: 235068243; Callsign: 2BPR6
- Status: in service

General characteristics
- Type: Ferry
- Tonnage: 26,500 GT (as built)
- Length: 186.46 m (611 ft 9 in) (as built); 222 m (728 ft 4 in) (2021 rebuild)
- Beam: 25.6 m (84 ft 0 in)
- Draft: 6.63 m (21 ft 9 in)
- Installed power: 2 x MAN B&W 9L 48/60B
- Propulsion: 2 × Controllable pitch propellers; 2 × bow thrusters
- Speed: 24 knots (44 km/h; 28 mph)
- Capacity: 980 passengers (As built, limited to 720 passengers by Stena); 970 passengers (2021 rebuild)
- Notes: Ship lengthened during 2021

MS Stena Baltica is a RoPax ferry, owned by Stena Line and operates on the Baltic Sea between Nynäshamn, Sweden and Ventspils, Latvia. The ship previously operated on the Irish Sea, between Birkenhead and Belfast, as Stena Mersey.

The ship was built in Italy by Cantiere Navale Visentini and launched in 2005. As built, the vessel measured 26,500 gross tonnage (GT) and could carry up to 980 passengers. The on-board cabins had space to sleep 480 passengers. There are four vehicle decks with a capacity for approximately 200 trailers. The vessels maximum speed is 27 knots (50 km/h; 31 mph), but usually sails at 23 knots (43 km/h; 26 mph) in normal service.

== History ==
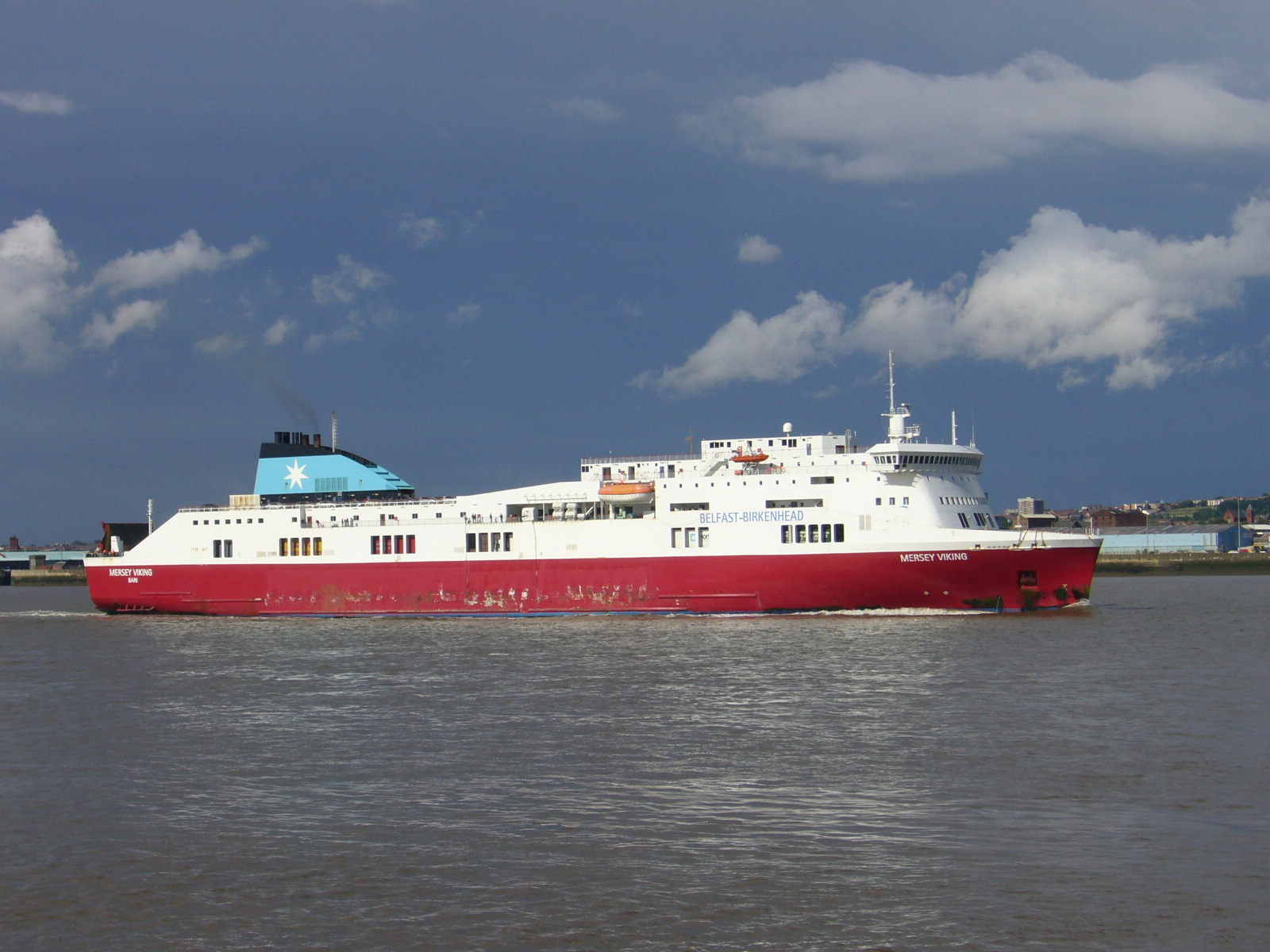
Stena Mersey as Mersey Viking in Liverpool

Stena Baltica was launched in December 2005 as Mersey Viking, entering service with Norse Merchant Ferries later the same month. A few months later, Norse Merchant Ferries was acquired by Norfolkline. Mersey Viking received Norfolkline lettering on her red hull but retained her Norse Merchant Ferries funnel for several years.

In July 2010 Norfolkline was acquired by DFDS. The vessel was renamed Mersey Seaways during her refit in August 2010. Later that same year, DFDS sold its Northern Irish operations to Stena Line. In August 2011, the vessel was renamed Stena Mersey

Early in 2012, Stena Mersey, along with her sister ship Stena Lagan, was given a complete interior and exterior refit and repaint at Harland & Wolff.

Stena Mersey was replaced on the Birkenhead to Belfast route in February 2021, following the introduction of the E-Flexer-class ferry Stena Embla in late January 2021. Stena Mersey is due to undergo lengthening at the Sedef Shipyard in Tuzla, Istanbul, with the inclusion of a 36 m (118 ft) midsection, renamed as Stena Baltica and then re-entering service. Stena Baltica is planned to operate on the Baltic Sea between Nynäshamn and Ventspils.

== Route ==
Stena Mersey operated on the Birkenhead–Belfast route with her marginally older sister ship Stena Lagan. The total journey time on board the ship was 8 hours.

== On board ==
Stena Mersey carried a maximum of 720 passengers.
