= Stena Scotia =

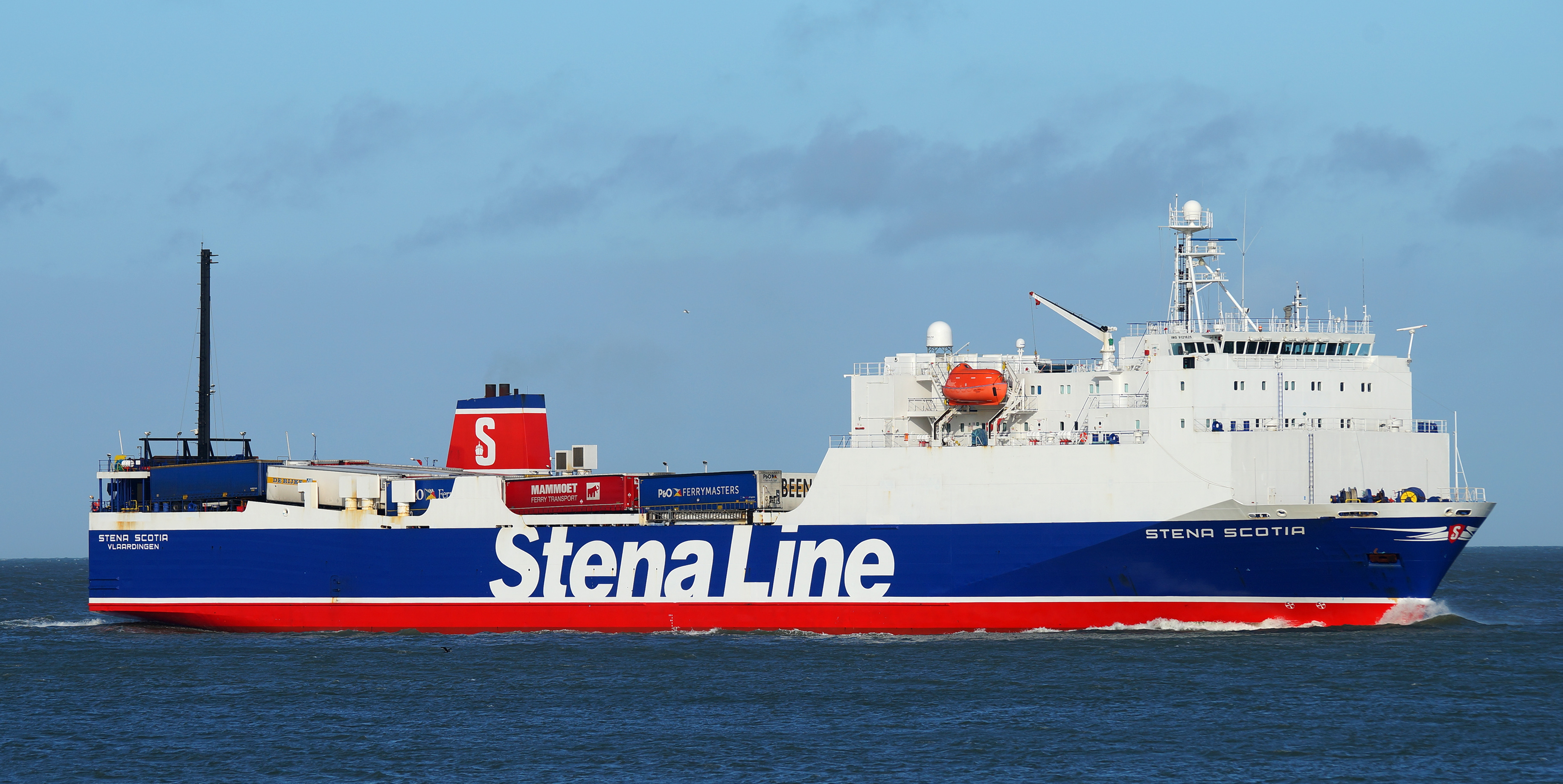

History
- Name: Stena Scotia (2010-present); Scotia Seaways (2010); Maersk Exporter (1996-2010)
- Owner: Stena Line
- Operator: Stena Line
- Port of registry: (Isle of Man) Douglas
- Route: Belfast-Heysham
- Builder: Miho Shimizu Ship Yard
- Launched: 16 February 1996
- Completed: 1996
- Identification: IMO number: 9121625
- Status: In service

General characteristics
- Tonnage: 13,000 GT
- Length: 142.5 m (467 ft 6 in)
- Beam: 23.2 m (76 ft 1 in)
- Draught: 5.4 m (17 ft 9 in)
- Decks: 3
- Installed power: 2x Hitachi Zosen Sulzer 8ZAL40S, 5475 kW / 7300HP. Aux. Engines 2 x Sulzer 4SC6S20D
- Propulsion: 2 x propellers
- Speed: 18.6 knots (34.4 km/h; 21.4 mph)
- Capacity: 1,692 lane-metres; 120 trailers

Stena Scotia is a freight ferry owned by Stena and operated by the ferry company Stena Line. She operates on the route that links Heysham with Belfast. She was built in 1996 at the Miho Shipyards in Japan as the Maersk Exporter for Norfolkline. In 2010, she was renamed as the Scotia Seaways when DFDS Seaways acquired Norfolkline and took over all of its operations. Later that year, she was chartered to Stena Line where she was repainted and again renamed, this time as the Stena Scotia, and re-flagged to the Isle of Man. She has three sister ships, Stena Hibernia, Flandria Seaways and Anglia Seaways. She can only accommodate 12 passengers, but provides 1,692 lane-metres.

== Heysham-Belfast ==
The ship crosses the Irish Sea in about eight hours.
