= Stena Scandica =

Ferry serving the Baltic Sea, between Sweden and Latvia

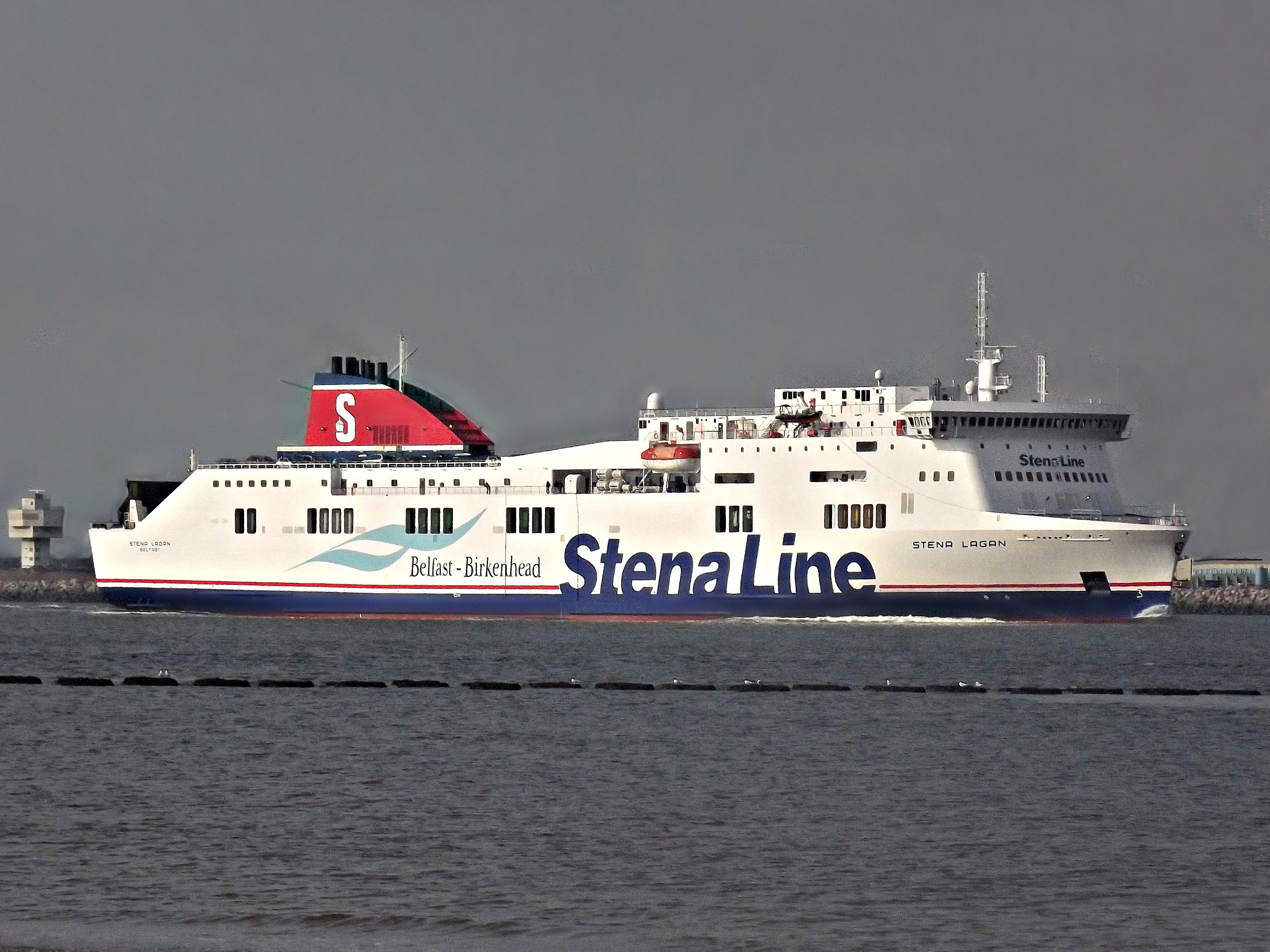
- Stena Lagan entering the River Mersey in 2012.

History
- Name: Lagan Viking (2005–2010); Lagan Seaways (2010–2011); Stena Lagan (2011–2021); Stena Scandica (2021–)
- Owner: Levantina Trasporti Srl (2005–2012); Stena Ropax Ltd (2012– )
- Operator: Norse Merchant Ferries (2005); Norfolkline (2005–2010); DFDS Seaways (2010–2010); Stena Line (2010– )
- Port of registry: 2005–2008: Bari,Italy; 2008– 2020 Belfast, United Kingdom; 2020 - 2021 Nassau,Bahamas; 2021 - present Hellerup, Denmark; IMO number: 9329849; MMSI number: 235065969; Callsign: 2BGR6
- Route: Birkenhead–Belfast (2005–2020); Nynäshamn–Ventspils (2021–)
- Builder: Cantiere Navale Visentini
- Yard number: 212
- Launched: 5 February 2005
- Completed: July 2005
- Maiden voyage: 2005
- Status: in service

General characteristics
- Tonnage: 26,500 GT (as built)
- Length: 186.6 m (612 ft) (as built); 222 m (728 ft) (2020-21 rebuild)
- Beam: 25.6 m (84 ft)
- Draught: 6.63 m (21.8 ft)
- Deck clearance: 4.9 m (16 ft) (height); 5.3 m (17 ft) (width)
- Installed power: 21,600 kW (29,000 hp) at 500 rpm
- Propulsion: 2 x MAN B&W 9L 48/60B diesel engines; 2 × Controllable pitch propellers; 2 × bow thrusters
- Speed: 24 kn (44 km/h; 28 mph)
- Capacity: 980 passengers and crew (As built. Restricted to 720 passengers by Stena); 970 passengers (2020-21 rebuild)
- Notes: Ship lengthened during 2020-21

MS Stena Scandica is a RoPax ferry, owned by Stena Line and it operates on the Baltic Sea between Nynäshamn, Sweden and Ventspils, Latvia.

== History ==
Stena Scandica was built in July 2005, as Lagan Viking, entering service with Norse Merchant Ferries later the same month. It was named after the River Lagan, the principal river in Belfast. A few months later, Norse Merchant Ferries was acquired by Norfolkline.

In July 2010, Norfolkline was acquired by DFDS. The vessel was renamed Lagan Seaways during her refit in August 2010. Later that same year, DFDS sold its Northern Irish operations to Stena Line. The sale included the Belfast–Birkenhead route and Lagan Seaways' sister ship, Mersey Seaways. In August 2011, she was renamed Stena Lagan

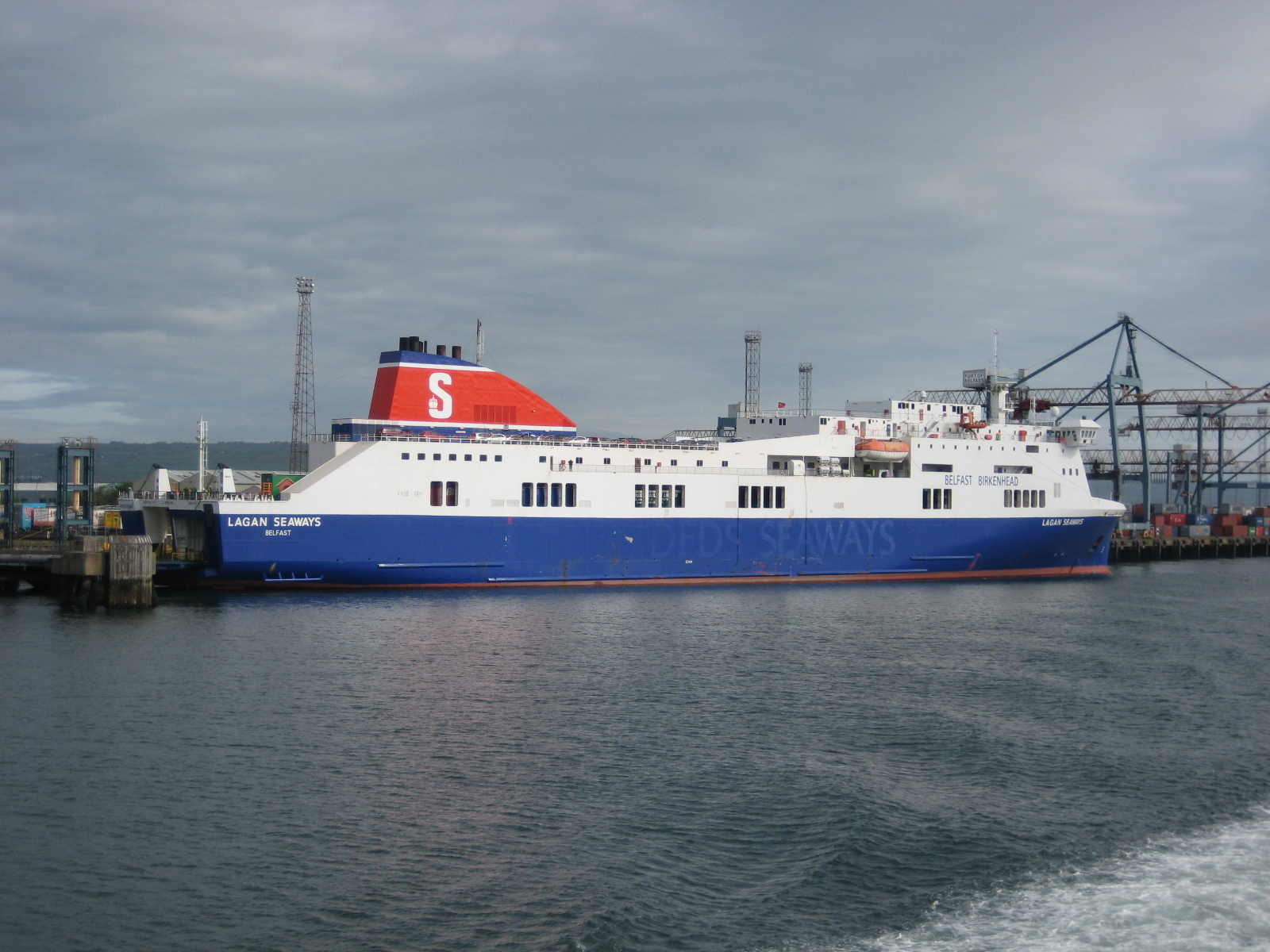
Lagan Seaways in Belfast

In March 2020, Stena Edda arrived from China to replace Stena Lagan on the Belfast to Birkenhead route. Stena Lagan departed for Tuzla, Istanbul on 14 March 2020, for lengthening with a 36 m (118 ft) midsection. Beside the lengthening, she received a new bow. The ship was renamed Stena Scandica before the end of 2020.

On August 29, 2022 a fire started in a cooling container on the car deck whilst en route to Latvia, close to Gotska Sandön off the Swedish east coast. Although the crew could extinguish the fire without injuries, it caused a loss of power, and the ferry drifting towards the coast of Gotland. Several passengers were evacuated by helicopter to the nearby ferry M/S Visby who continued toward Gotland. After several hours, two of the engines could be started. On August 30, Stena Scandica arrived in Nynäshamn, Sweden under her own power.

== Route ==
Stena Lagan operated on the Irish Sea, on the Birkenhead to Belfast route, with her sister ship Stena Mersey. In all, the total journey time on board the ship was 8 hours. From early 2021, Stena Scandica operates on the Baltic Sea between Nynäshamn, Sweden and Ventspils, Latvia.

== On board ==
Stena Lagan carried up to 720 passengers. As Stena Scandica, the ship's capacity was increased to 970 passengers, with the 2020-21 lengthening of the ship.
