= MS Stena Adventurer (2002) =

Ferry operating between Dublin and Holyhead

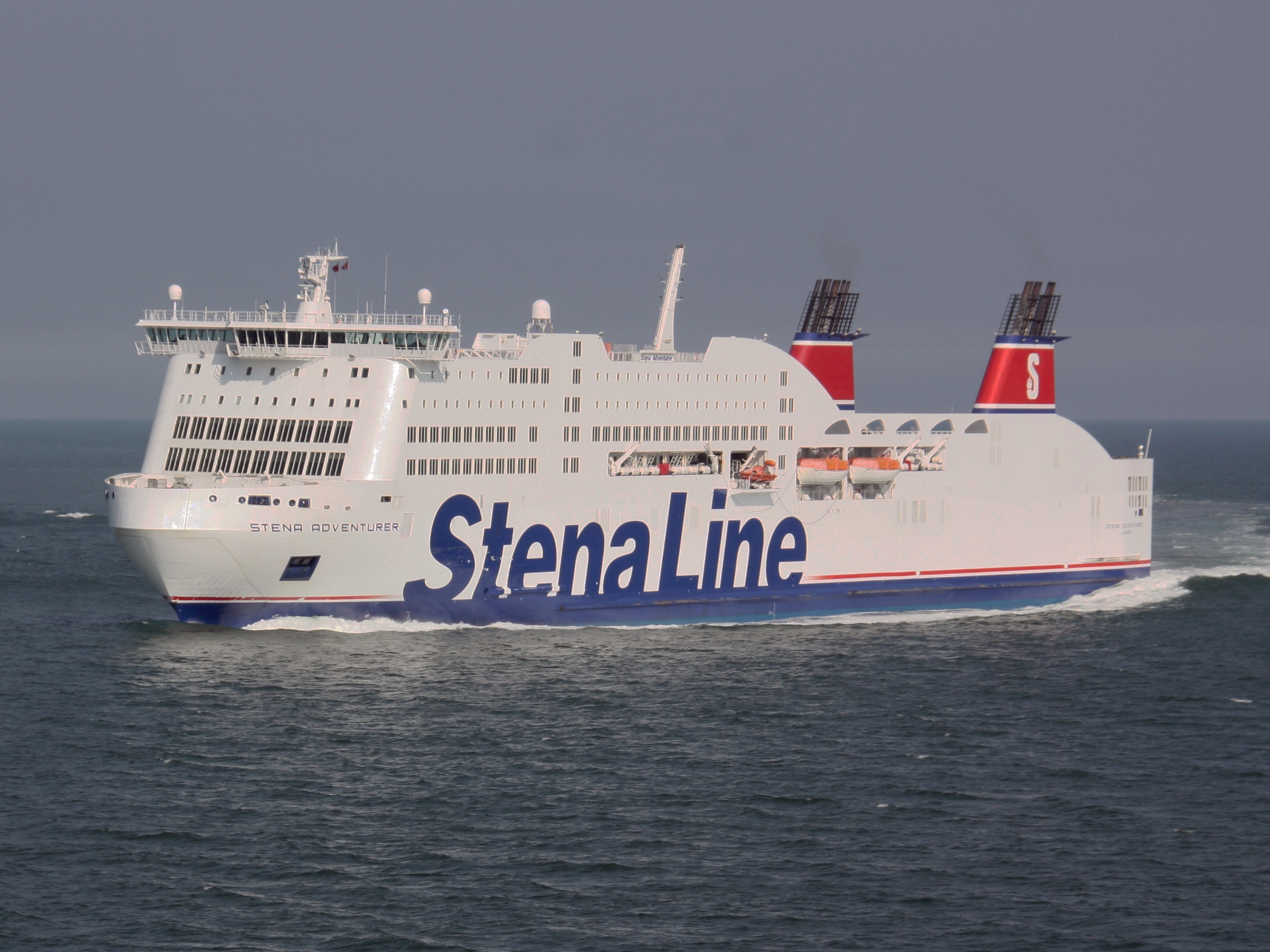
- Stena Adventurer en route to Dublin

History
- Name: Stena Adventurer
- Owner: Stena RoPax Ltd.
- Operator: Stena Line
- Port of registry: London. United Kingdom
- Route: Holyhead - Dublin
- Builder: Hyundai Heavy Industries, South Korea
- Cost: €100 million
- Yard number: 1393
- Launched: 31 October 2002
- In service: 2003
- Identification: IMO number: 9235529
- Status: In service

General characteristics
- Class & type: Cruise Ferry RoRo
- Tonnage: 43,532 GT
- Length: 211.56 m (694 ft 1 in)
- Beam: 29.3 m (96 ft 2 in)
- Draught: 6.3 m (20 ft 8 in)
- Decks: 11
- Installed power: 4 x MAN B&W 9L40/54 diesels
- Propulsion: 2 × Controllable pitch propellers 2 × Bow thrusters
- Speed: 22.5 knots
- Capacity: 1,500 passengers; 124 Cabins / 364 beds; 500 cars; 3,400 lane meters

Stena Adventurer is a roll-on/roll-off passenger (ro-pax) ferry operated by Stena Line on its Holyhead–Dublin route. She was launched in 2002 and entered service on the route the following year. Along with Stena Estrid, she is one of two Stena Line vessels serving the crossing.

== Design and layout ==
Stena Adventurer is designed to carry both passengers and freight. The vessel includes approximately 3,400 lane metres of vehicle space for cars and freight vehicles. Passenger accommodation is arranged on three decks, while vehicles are carried on five deck levels.

== Sister ship ==
Stena Adventurer is the second of two identical ships built by Hyundai Heavy Industries, for Stena Line. Her sister ship is Stena Scandinavica which operates on Stena Line's Gothenburg–Kiel route.

== On board ==
The ship has two decks reserved for standard passenger vehicles and freight trailers. An additional vehicle deck is primarily used for hazardous goods vehicles. Passenger accommodation is spread across three decks.

== Fishguard to Dublin ==
Following damage to port infrastructure at the Port of Holyhead during Storm Darragh in December 2024 and the subsequent temporary closure of the port, Stena Adventurer was deployed on a Dublin–Fishguard route. This service initially carried freight only, but was later opened to all traffic types. Holyhead reopened on the 16 January 2025.
