= Stena Edda =

Ferry

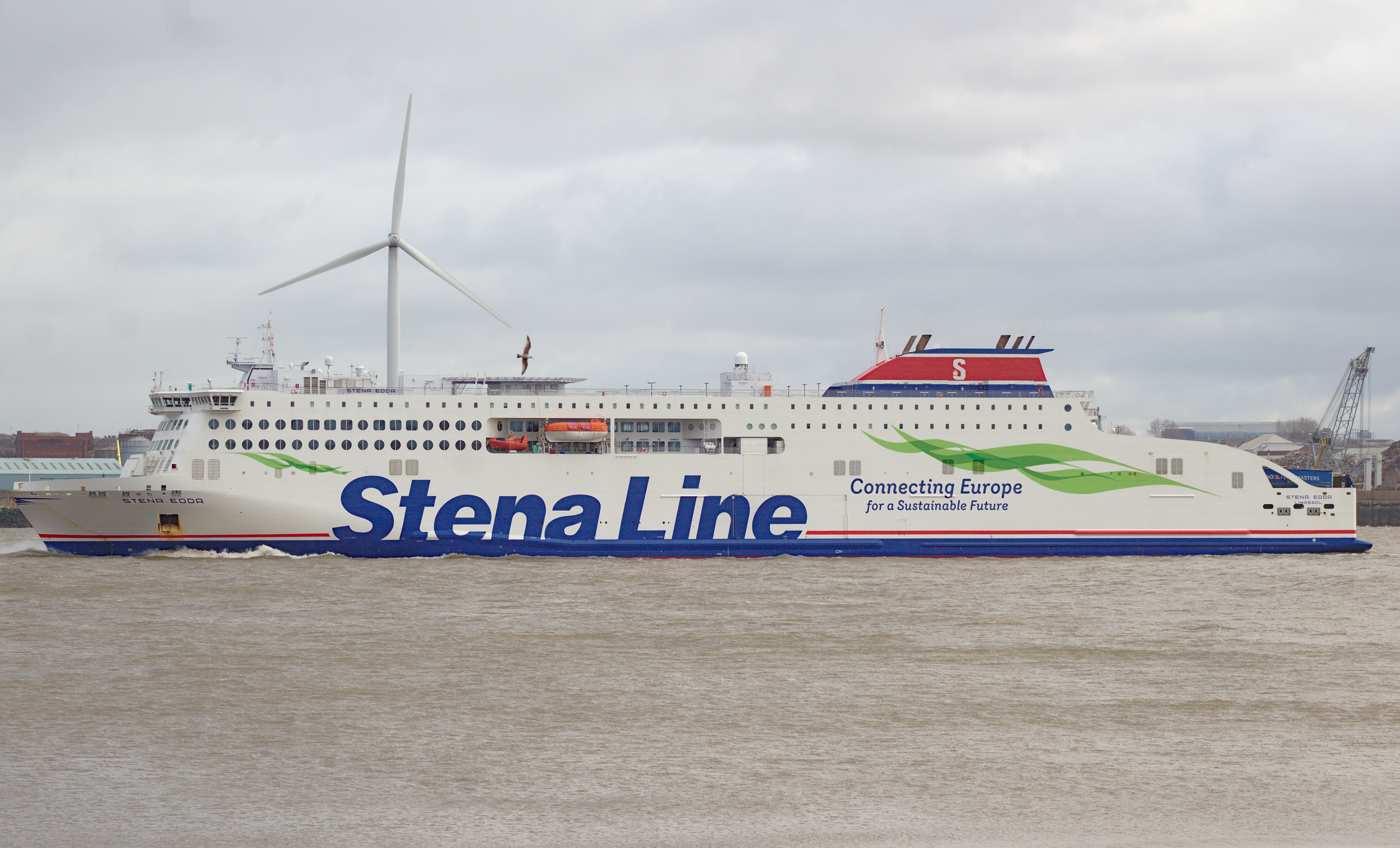
- Stena Edda on the River Mersey in 2021

History
- Name: Stena Edda
- Operator: Stena Line
- Route: Birkenhead–Belfast
- Builder: China Merchants Jinling Shipyard (Weihai) Co. Ltd.
- Launched: 15 April 2019
- Acquired: 15 January 2020
- Maiden voyage: 22 January 2020
- In service: 9 March 2020
- Identification: Call sign: 5BLE5; IMO number: 9807308; MMSI number: 209885000
- Status: In service

General characteristics
- Class & type: E-Flexer
- Tonnage: 41,671 GT
- Length: 215 m (705.4 ft)
- Beam: 28 m (91.9 ft)
- Installed power: 2 x Caterpillar Inc MaK 12 M43 C gas (Methanol or LNG) ready V12 4-stroke marine diesel propulsion engines built by Caterpillar Motoren Rostock GmbH, Rostock, Germany. 3 x Wärtsilä 8L20 auxiliary engines
- Propulsion: 2 x Caterpillar Inc Propulsion (Berg) Feathering Controllable-Pitch Propellers MPP 1410f (PB58547). 2 x Wärtsila WTT24 CP 2,400kW Bow Thrusters
- Speed: 22 knots (41 km/h; 25 mph)
- Capacity: 1,000 passengers; 120 cars; 210 freight vehicles; 4-6 bicycles

Stena Edda is a passenger and vehicle RoPax ferry operated by Stena Line between Birkenhead and Belfast.

== History ==
The second of the E-Flexer-class ferries, the ship was constructed at the AVIC Weihai Shipyard in China. The ship was floated on 15 April 2019, and delivered to Stena at Weihai on 15 January 2020.

After conducting berthing trials at Belfast Harbour in February 2020, the ship began its maiden commercial voyage on 9 March 2020, completing it the following day.

Stena Edda was a replacement for the Stena Lagan. Stena Lagan was transferred to operate between Nynäshamn and Ventspils on the Baltic Sea, following a rebuild and renaming as Stena Scandica.
