= Stena Embla =

Ferry

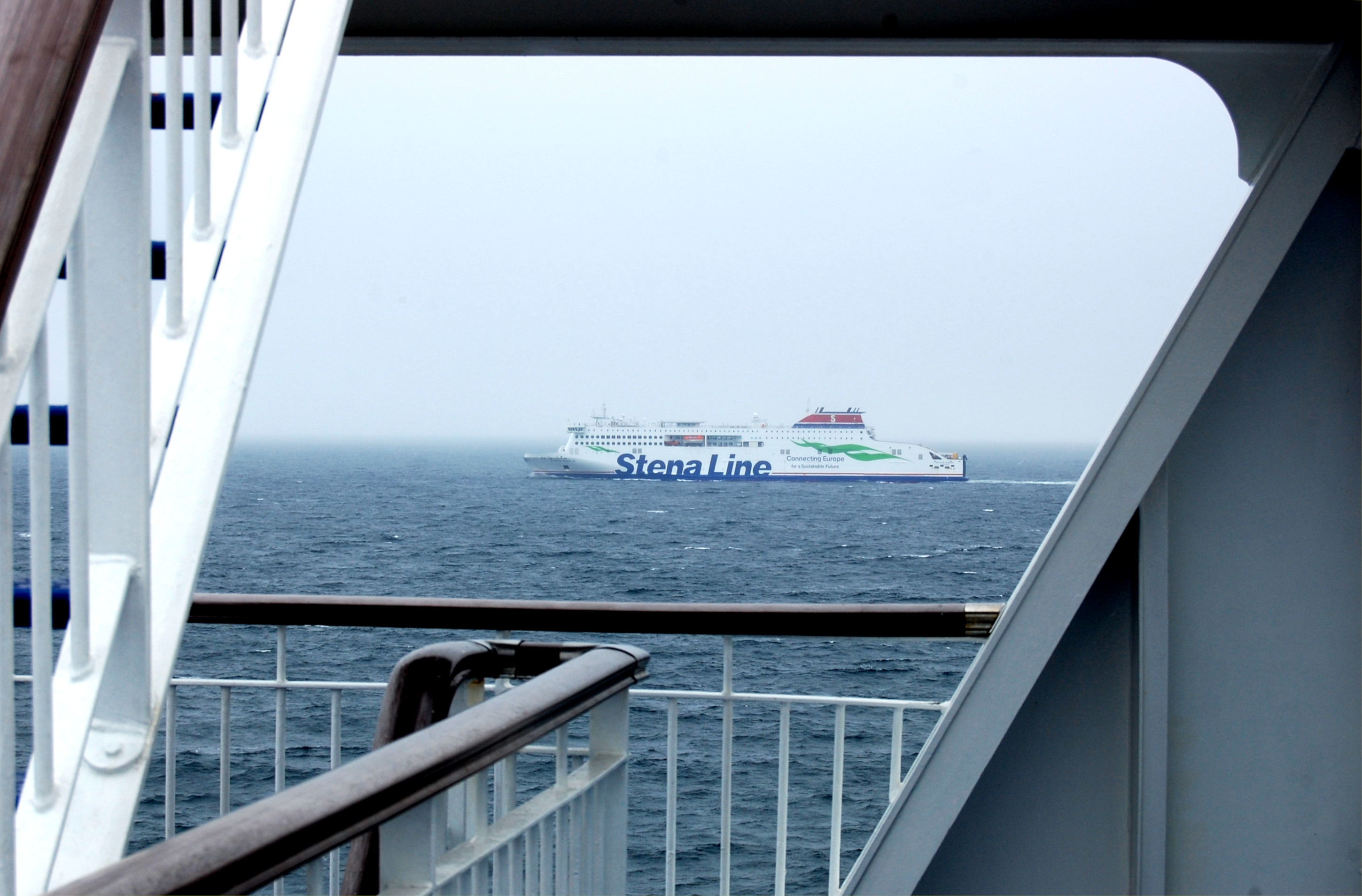
- Stena Embla seen from her sister ship, Stena Edda, passing on the Irish Sea, 19 July 2024.

History
- Name: Stena Embla
- Operator: Stena Line
- Route: Birkenhead–Belfast
- Builder: China Merchants Jinling Shipyard (Weihai) Co. Ltd.
- Laid down: 18 April 2019
- Completed: 18 November 2020
- Acquired: 1 December 2020
- In service: 14 January 2021
- Identification: Call sign: 5BQA5; IMO number: 9807322; MMSI number: 210098000
- Status: In service

General characteristics
- Class & type: E-Flexer-class ferry
- Tonnage: 41,671 GT
- Length: 215.30 m (706 ft 4 in)
- Beam: 28 m (91 ft 10 in)
- Decks: 10
- Deck clearance: 6.2 m (20 ft 4 in) per deck
- Ramps: 3
- Speed: 22 knots (41 km/h; 25 mph)
- Capacity: 1,000 passengers; 175 cars; 165 freight trailers; up to 120 freight accompanied pieces
- Crew: 55-65 (dependant on demand)

Stena Embla is a passenger and vehicle RoPax ferry operated by Stena Line between Birkenhead and Belfast.

== History ==
The third of the E-Flexer-class ferries, the ship was constructed at the AVIC Weihai Shipyard in China and floated on 15 November 2019. The ship competed its sea trials in the Yellow Sea before the end of October 2020, and was delivered to Stena at Weihai on 1 December 2020.

The ship began its maiden commercial voyage from Rosslare to Cherbourg on 14 January 2021, and was transferred to the Birkenhead to Belfast route by 26 January 2021.

Stena Embla was a replacement for the Stena Mersey.
