= Stena Spirit =

Passenger ship

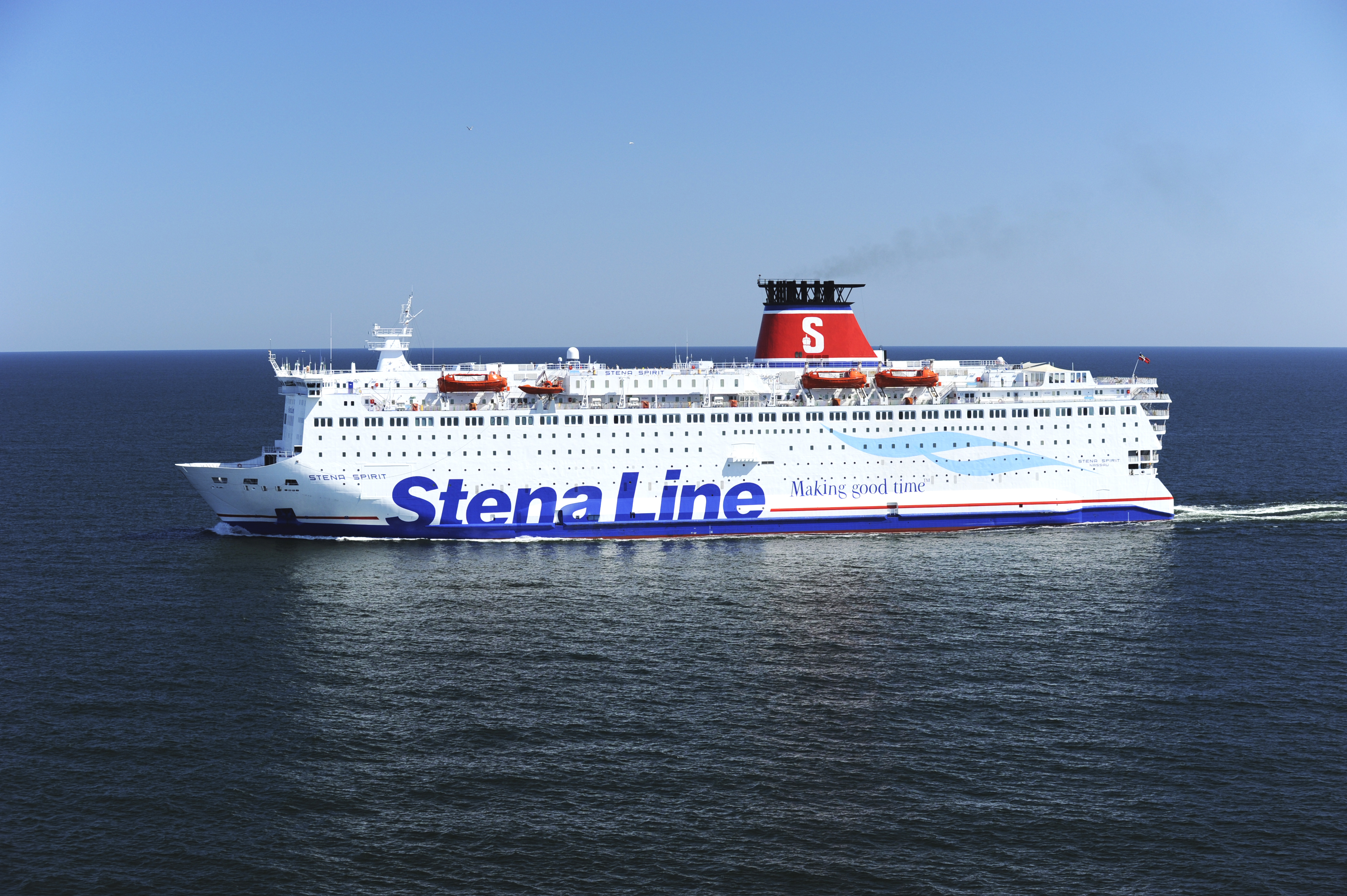
- Stena Spirit, 2011

History
- Name: 1983–1986: Stena Germanica; 1986–2011: Stena Scandinavica; 2011 onwards: Stena Spirit
- Operator: Stena Line
- Port of registry: 1983–2011: Gothenburg, Sweden; 2011-2023: Nassau, Bahamas; 2023-: Hellerup, Denmark
- Route: Karlskrona-Gdynia
- Builder: Stocznia im. Lenina, Gdańsk
- Yard number: B494/2
- Launched: 16 April 1983
- Completed: 1988
- Identification: Call sign: C6ZK8; IMO number: 7907661; MMSI number: 311058100
- Status: In service

General characteristics (as built)
- Tonnage: 39,178 GT
- Length: 175.37 m (575.4 ft)
- Beam: 30.80 m (101.0 ft)
- Draught: 6.75 m (22.1 ft)
- Installed power: 4 × Zgoda-Sulzer 16ZV49/48
- Propulsion: Two shafts; controllable pitch propellers; Two bow thrusters
- Speed: 21.5 knots (39.8 km/h; 24.7 mph)
- Capacity: 1,700 passengers; 569 cars

Stena Spirit is a large cruiseferry owned by Stena Line. She entered service in 1988 as Stena Scandinavica and after a major refit in Gothenburg is now in service between Karlskrona and Gdynia.

== History ==
Stena Scandinavica was the second of four ferries ordered in 1980 by Stena Line for Scandinavian routes. She was launched in 1983 as Stena Germanica, but problems at the construction yard delayed her completion until 1988 when she entered service on the Gothenburg – Kiel route, joining her sister Stena Germanica. The remaining two hulls were planned to be Stena Polonica (completed for ANEK Lines as El Venizelos) and Stena Baltica; lengthened by over 50 m, but never completed).

In April 2011 Stena Scandinavia was replaced on the Kiel – Gothenburg route by a new Stena Scandinavica. Following a major refit she was renamed Stena Spirit and entered service between Karlskrona and Gdynia.

== Gdynia accident, Poland ==
On 17 May 2012 at 8:45am, the Stena Spirit was departing from Gdynia Ferry Terminal en route to Karlskrona, Sweden when she became involved in an accident at the Baltic Container Terminal. The bow of the cruiseferry struck one of the Gantry cranes causing it to catastrophically collapse onto the quay below as she was manoeuvring. Three employees of the container terminal were injured, all requiring hospital treatment. Two of the Three staff members are said to be in a serious condition. None of the passengers or crew on board the Stena Spirit were injured.

== Incident at sea ==
On June 29, 2023, a 38-year-old woman and her 7-year-old son fell overboard. The incident occurred around halfway between Gdynia, Poland and Karlskrona, Sweden. At 16.20 local time, the "man overboard" alarm was sounded on board the ferry and the engines were stopped. A MOB was launched and rescue services from Sweden, Germany and Poland participated in the search. At around 17.30, both victims had been located and was brought by helicopter to a hospital in Karlskrona, Sweden. Both victims died in the incident. In December 2023, it was concluded, that the incident was to be categorized as a "suicide/murder". Surveillance tapes from the ferry and interviews with witnessed determined that the cause was a deliberate jump overboard by the mother of the 7-year-old boy. She had him in her arms, when she jumped from the ferry. The Swedish authorities closed the case after this conclusion.
