= Stena Estrid =

Ferry

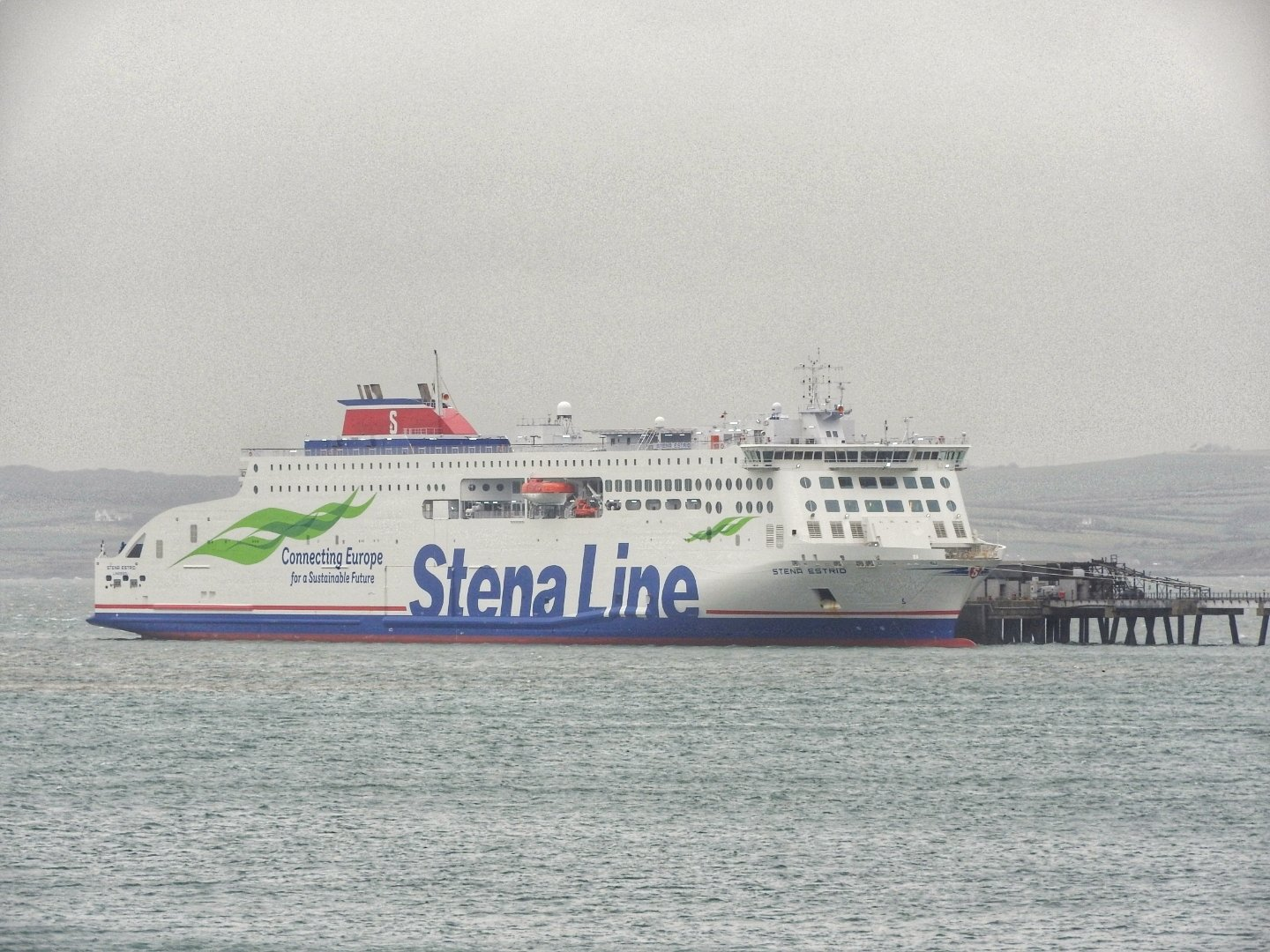
- Stena Estrid at berth in Holyhead

History
- Name: Stena Estrid (Goddess of Beauty in Swedish)
- Owner: Stena Line
- Operator: Stena Line
- Route: Holyhead–Dublin
- Completed: 2019
- Maiden voyage: 13 January 2020
- Identification: Call sign: 5BLA5; IMO number: 9807293; MMSI number: 209878000
- Status: In service

General characteristics
- Tonnage: 41,671 GT
- Length: 215 m (705.4 ft)
- Beam: 28 m (91.9 ft)
- Speed: 22 knots (41 km/h; 25 mph)
- Capacity: 1,000 passengers; 120 cars; 210 freight vehicles

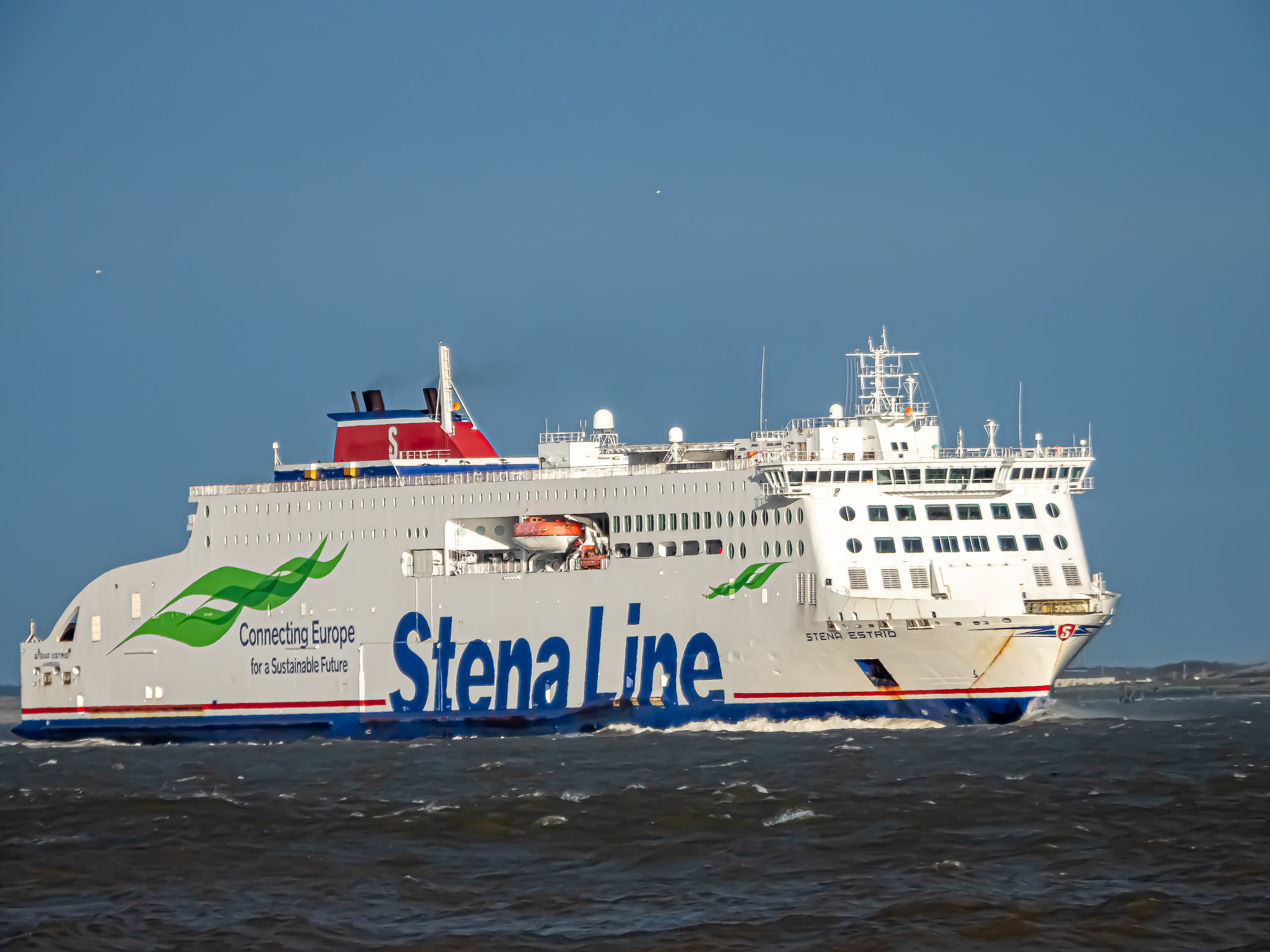
Stena Estrid visiting River Mersey

The Stena Estrid is a passenger and vehicle 'Ro-Pax' ferry which sails for Stena Line on its Holyhead–Dublin route. She is the first ferry in the E-Flexer class, and was delivered to the company on 15 November 2019.

She made her maiden commercial crossing between Holyhead and Dublin on 13 January 2020. This maiden voyage was delayed by approximately two hours due to adverse weather conditions with the new vessel sailing through Storm Brendan to arrive at Dublin later than scheduled. Stena Estrid has capacity for 1,000 passengers (and crew) and up to 3,100 lane metres of freight and 120 passenger cars.

Stena Estrid was featured in an episode of BBC’s Dom Digs In presented by Dominic Littlewood.

== Incidents ==
Stena Estrid sustained hull damage during a call to Holyhead on 7 January 2026. She was covered by the Stena Nordica whilst she underwent repairs at Cammell Laird.
