= MS Stena Scandinavica (2002) =

Stena Line ferry built in 2003

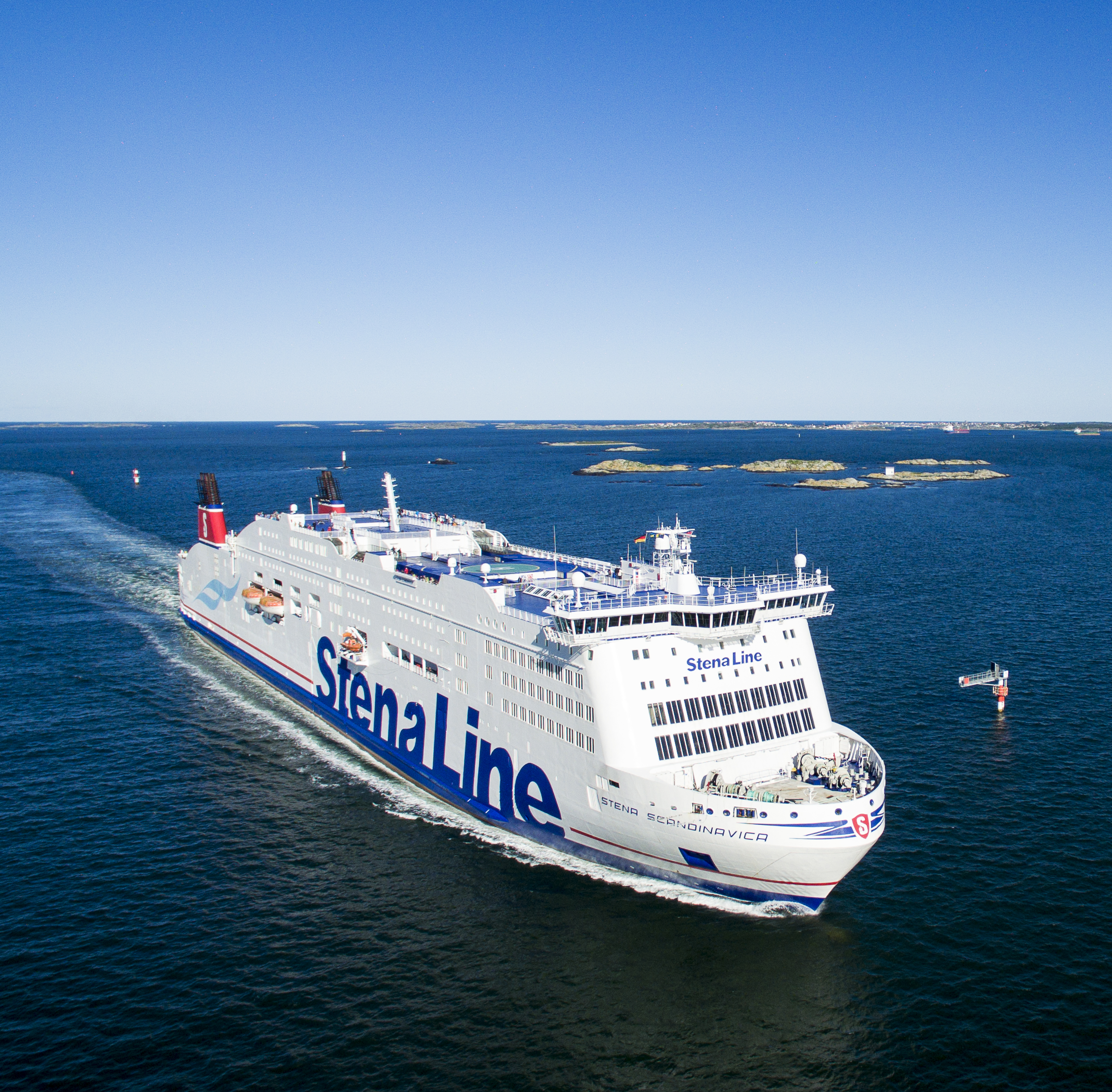

History
- Name: 2003-2003: Stena Britannica II; 2003-2010: Stena Britannica; 2010-2011: Britannica; 2011-2011: Stena Scandinavica IV; 2011 onwards: Stena Scandinavica
- Owner: Juteskaren
- Operator: Stena Line
- Port of registry: 2003-2011: Harwich, United Kingdom; 2011 onwards: Gothenburg, Sweden
- Route: Gothenburg-Kiel
- Builder: Hyundai Heavy Industries, South Korea
- Yard number: 1392
- Launched: 7 September 2002
- Identification: Call sign: SJLB; IMO number: 9235517; MMSI number: 266343000
- Status: In service

General characteristics (after 2007 rebuild)
- Tonnage: 55,050 GT
- Length: 241.06 m (790 ft 11 in)
- Beam: 29.9 m (98 ft 1 in)
- Draught: 6.3 m (20 ft 8 in)
- Installed power: 4 x MAN B&W 9L40/54 diesel engines
- Propulsion: 2 × Controllable pitch propellers; 3 × Bow thrusters
- Speed: 22.5 knots (41.7 km/h; 25.9 mph)
- Capacity: 1,040 passengers; 4,220 lane meters

Stena Scandinavica is a large ferry operated by Stena Line on the overnight Gothenburg – Kiel route, together with the Stena Germanica.

== Sister ships ==
Stena Scandinavica is the first of two identical ships built by Hyundai Heavy Industries, for Stena Line. Her sister ship is Stena Adventurer which operates between Holyhead and Dublin.
