= Mega Serena =

Cruise ferry

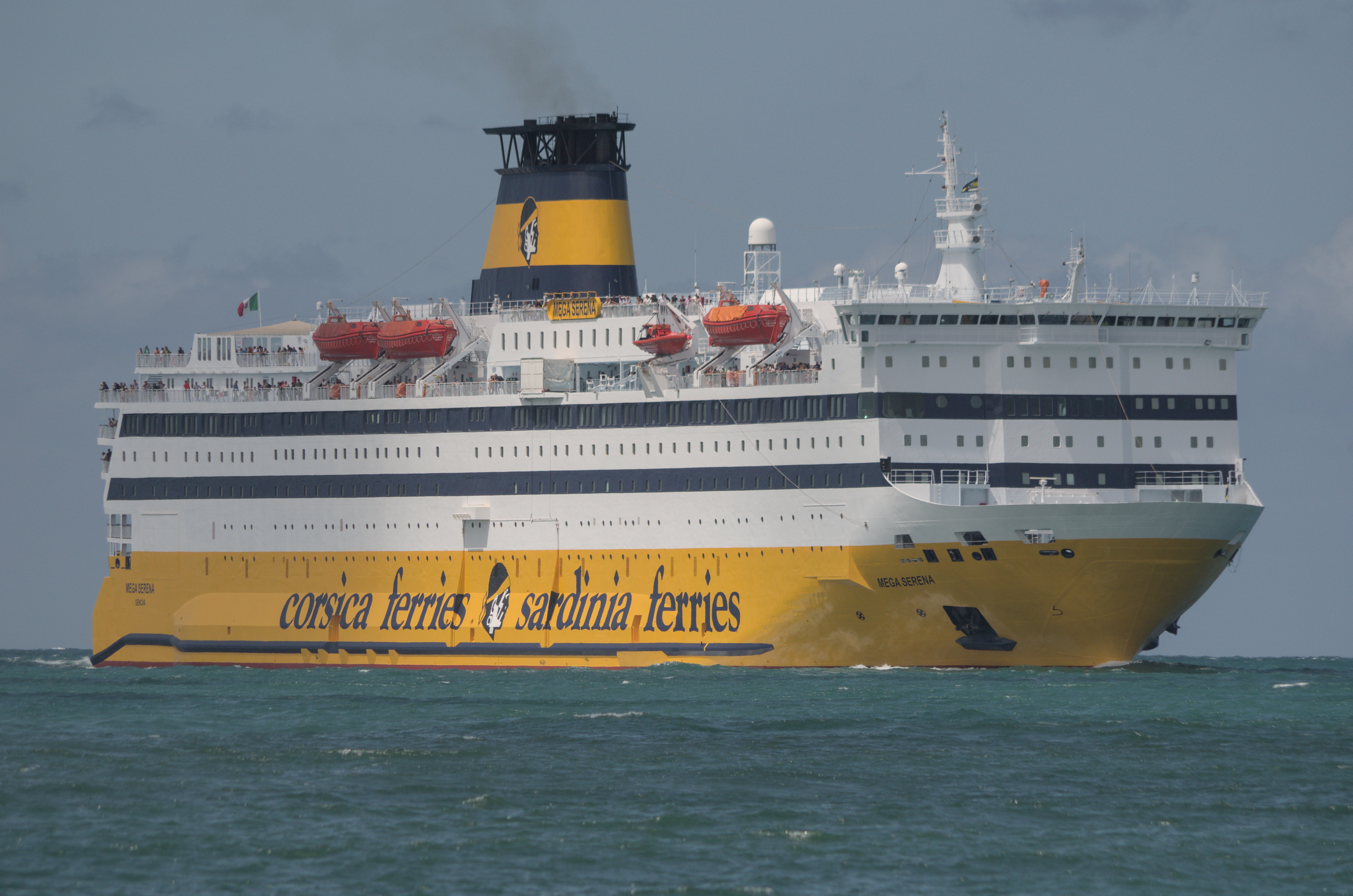
- Mega Serena in Livorno

History
- Name: 1981–82: Stena Scandinavica; 1982–86: Scandinavica; 1987–2010: Stena Germanica; 2010–2025: Stena Vision; 2025–present: Mega Serena
- Owner: Stena Line
- Operator: Stena Line
- Port of registry: 1981–2010: Gothenburg, Sweden; 2010-2023: Karlskrona, Sweden; 2023-2025: Limassol, Cyprus; 2025: Genoa, Italy
- Builder: Stocznia Gdynia, Gdynia
- Yard number: B494/1
- Launched: 22 August 1981
- In service: 1987
- Identification: IMO number: 7907659
- Status: in active service

General characteristics (as built)
- Tonnage: 39,178 GRT
- Length: 175.37 m (575.4 ft)
- Beam: 30.80 m (101.0 ft)
- Draught: 6.75 m (22.1 ft)
- Installed power: 4 × Zgoda-Sulzer 16ZV49/48 diesels
- Propulsion: 2 × controllable pitch propellers; 2 × bow thrusters
- Speed: 21.5 knots (40 km/h)
- Capacity: 1,700 passengers; 569 cars

Mega Serena is a cruise ferry owned and operated by Corsica Sardinia ferries. As Stena Germanica, she operated the overnight Kiel–Gothenburg route and the Gothenburg–Fredrikshavn route for Stena Line. As Stena Vision, she has operated on the Karlskrona–Gdynia and Cherbourg–Rosslare routes, before being sold to her present owners in late 2025.

== History ==
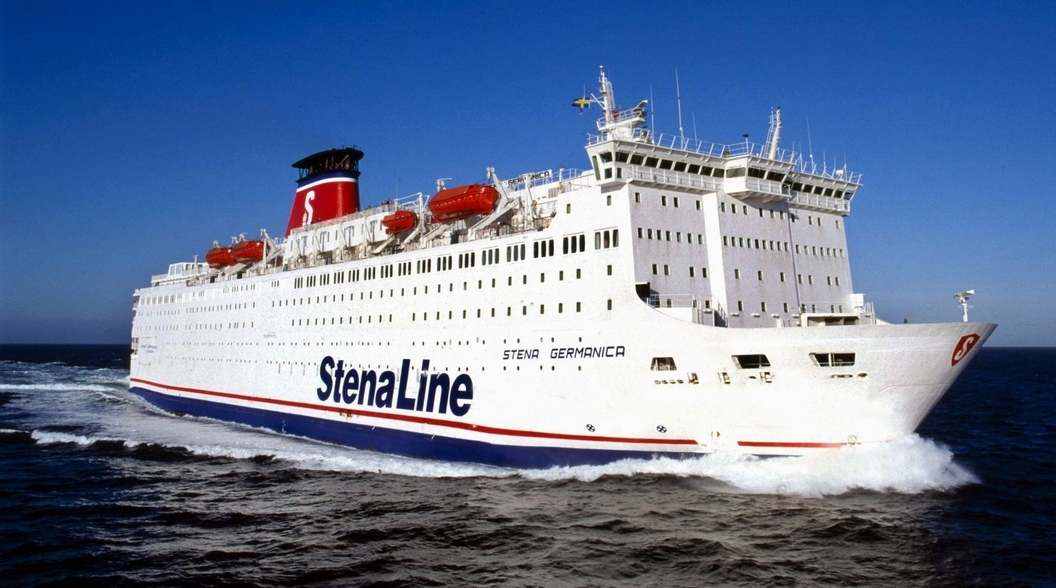
Stena Germanica in June 2005

Stena Germanica was the first of four large RoRo ferries ordered in 1980 by Stena Line for Scandinavian routes. She was launched in August 1981 as the Stena Scandinavica. However, due to problems at the construction yard, completion was delayed and it was not until 1987 that she entered service as the Stena Germanica on the Kiel–Gothenburg route, joined in 1988 by the second of the quartet, Stena Scandinavica. In 2010, Stena Germanica was replaced by Stena Hollandica. Following rebuilding in Gothenburg she was renamed Stena Vision.

In late 2025, she was sold to Corsica Sardinia Ferries for entry into service in the summer of 2026 on the Mediterranean Sea, and renamed Mega Serena.

== Layout ==
In her original layout, Stena Germanica had berths for 2,374 passengers and took 550 cars. Following refit, Stena Vision accommodates 1,700 passengers in a variety of standards of cabin. Her vehicle deck can take 360 cars.

== Service ==
From 1987 to 2010, Stena Germanica operated the overnight Gothenburg–Kiel route; until 2000 she also served the shorter Gothenburg–Fredrikshavn route during the summer months. In 2010, Stena Vision was transferred the Karlskrona–Gdynia route, before becoming the second ship on the Rosslare-Cherbourg route in 2023.
