= Stena Line =

Swedish ferry operator

- Type: Private company
- Industry: Transport
- Founded: 1962
- Founder: Sten A. Olsson
- Headquarters: Gothenburg, Sweden
- Key people: Niclas Martensson (CEO)
- Services: Ferries; Shipping; Port services
- Revenue: 32.6 billion SEK (2023)
- Number of employees: 5,000 (2015)
- Parent: Stena AB
- Website: stenaline.com

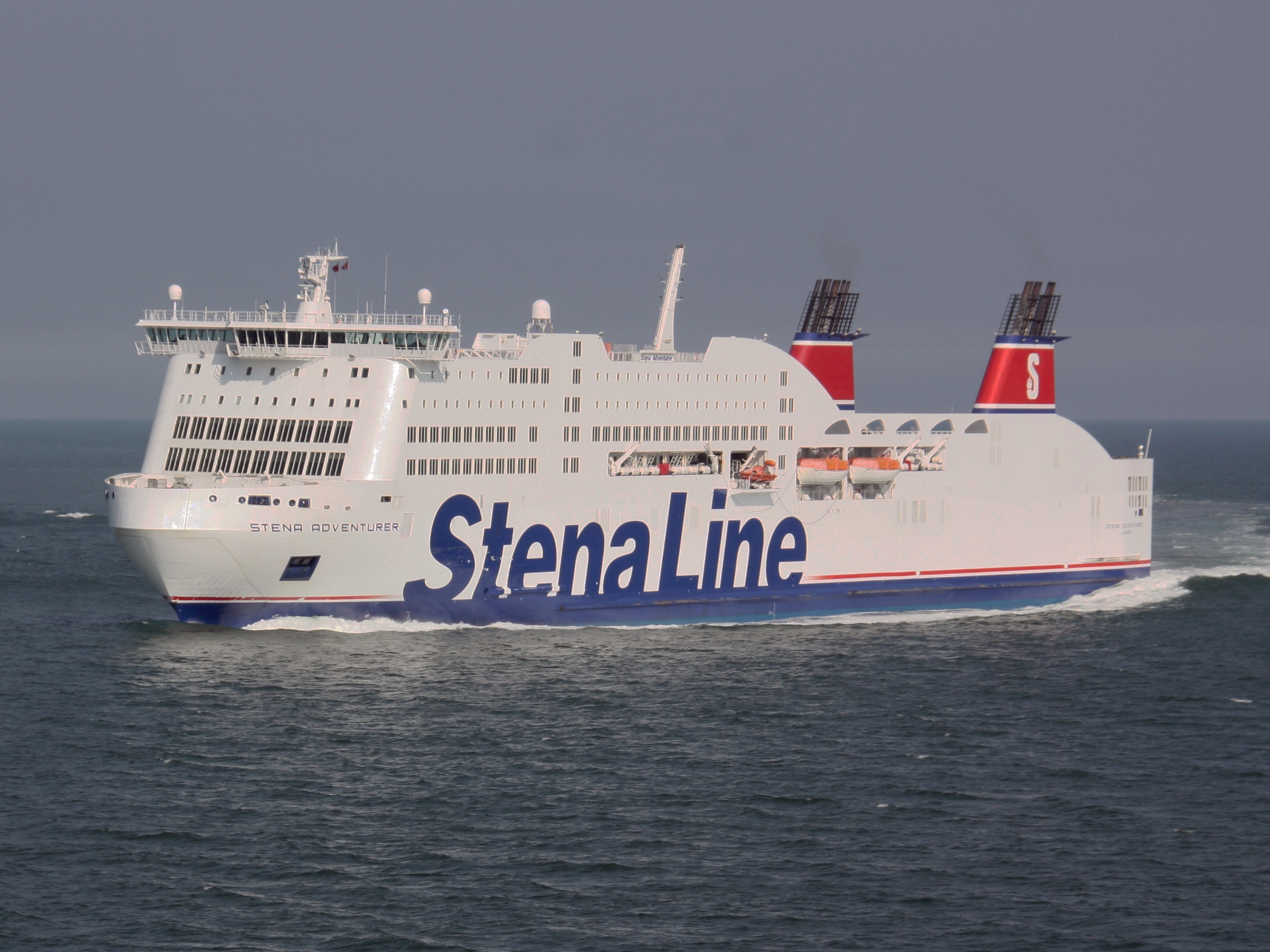
Stena Adventurer

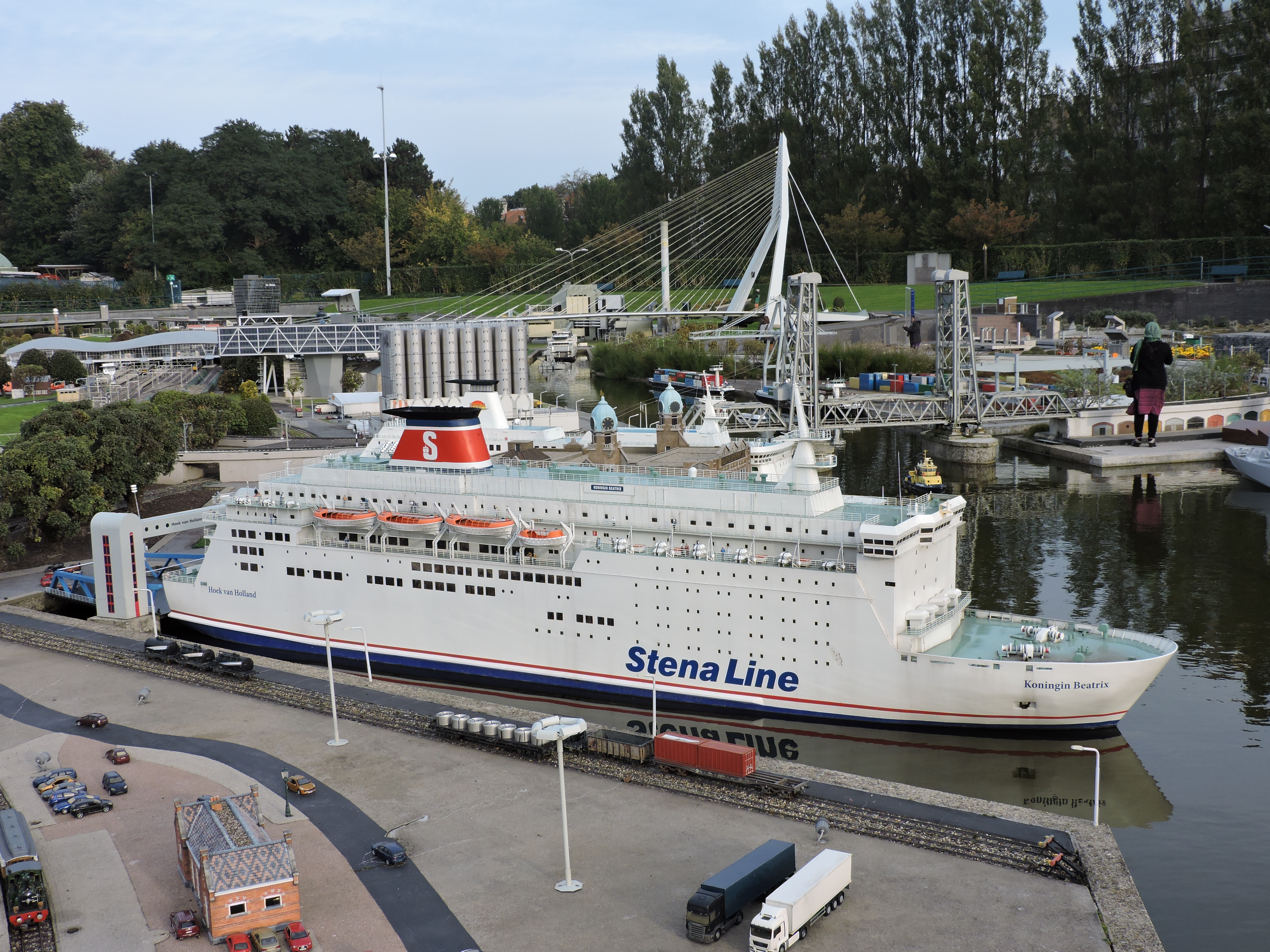
A miniature model of the Stena Line ferry on display at Madurodam miniature park, the Netherlands

Stena Line is a Swedish shipping line company and one of the world's largest ferry operators. It services Denmark, France, Germany, the United Kingdom, Ireland, Latvia, the Netherlands, Poland, Finland and Sweden. Stena Line is a major unit of Stena AB, itself a part of the Stena Sphere. It is a sister company to Stena Bulk, one of the largest tanker companies in the world.

== History ==
=== Formation ===
Stena Line was founded in 1962 by Sten A. Olsson in Gothenburg, Sweden, which still serves as the company's headquarters, when he acquired Skagenlinjen between Gothenburg and Frederikshavn, Denmark.

In 1972, Stena Line was one of the first ferry operators in Europe to introduce a computer-based reservation system for the travel business area. In 1978, the freight business area also started operating a computer-based reservation system.

=== Freight ===
The first freight-focused route started between Gothenburg, Sweden, and Kiel, Germany. The ship was the MS Stena Transporter.

=== North Sea ===
During the 1980s, Stena acquired three other ferry companies.

- 1981, Sessanlinjen (Sessan Line), Stena's biggest competitor on Sweden–Denmark routes, was acquired and incorporated into Stena Line. This included Sessan's two large newbuilds, Kronprinsessan Victoria and Prinsessan Birgitta, which became the largest ships operated by Stena by that date.
- 1983, Stena acquired Varberg-Grenå Linjen, and two years later also the right to that company's former name, Lion Ferry. Lion Ferry continued as a separate marketing company until 1997, when it was incorporated into Stena Line.
- 1989, Stena acquired yet another ferry company, Stoomvaart Maatschappij Zeeland (SMZ) (which at the time traded under the name Crown Line). SMZ's Hook of Holland–Harwich route then became a part of Stena Line.

=== North America ===
- 1988, July – Stena Line purchased the British Columbia Steamship Co., operators of a Victoria–Seattle route.
- 1990, November – The Victoria–Seattle run was permanently cancelled, and the local company ceased trading.

=== Irish Sea ===
In 1990, Stena Line doubled in size with the acquisition of Sealink British Ferries from Sea Containers. This first became Sealink Stena Line, then Stena Sealink Line and finally Stena Line (UK), which now operates all of Stena's ferry services between Great Britain and Ireland.

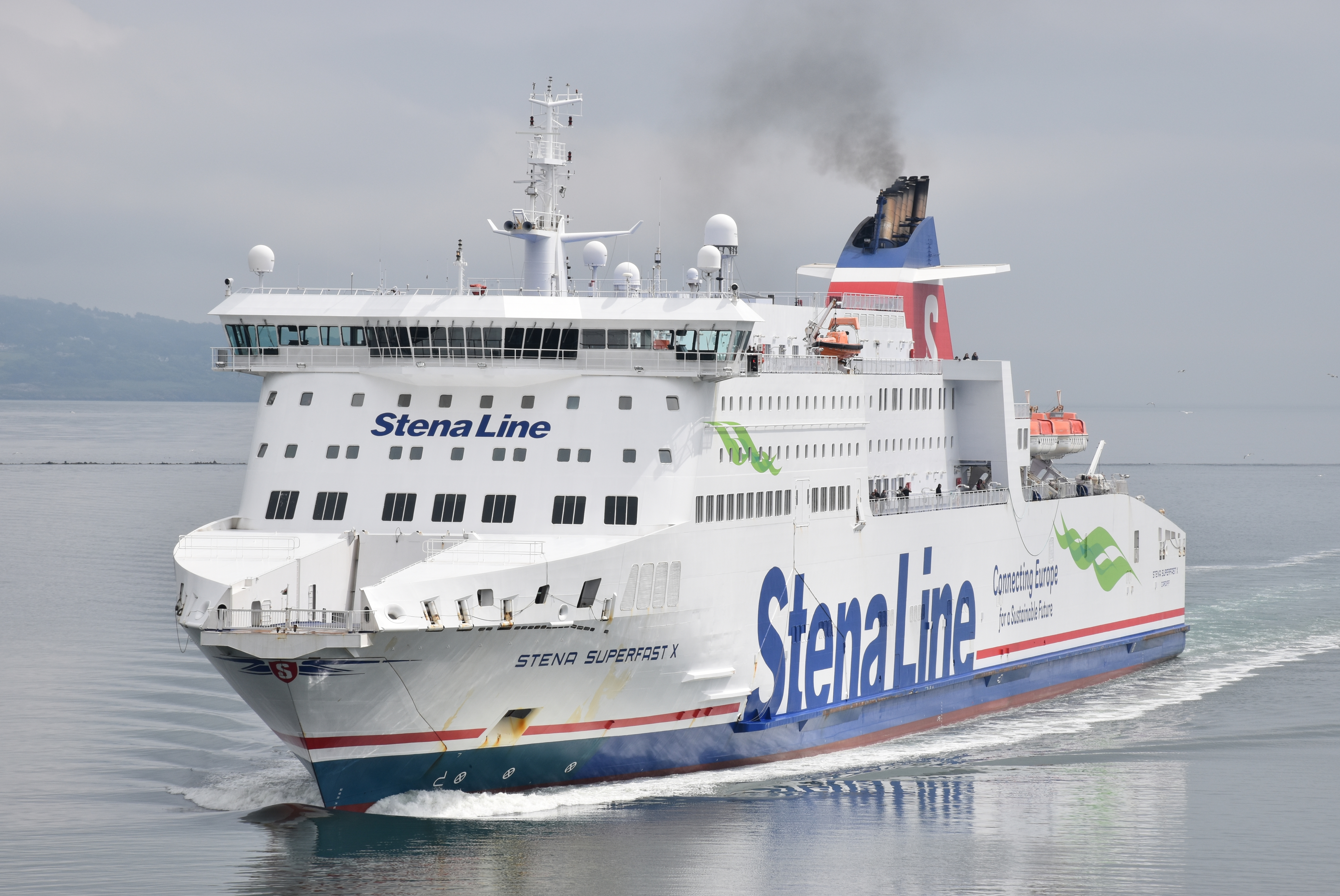
Stena Superfast X arriving at Dublin (2017)

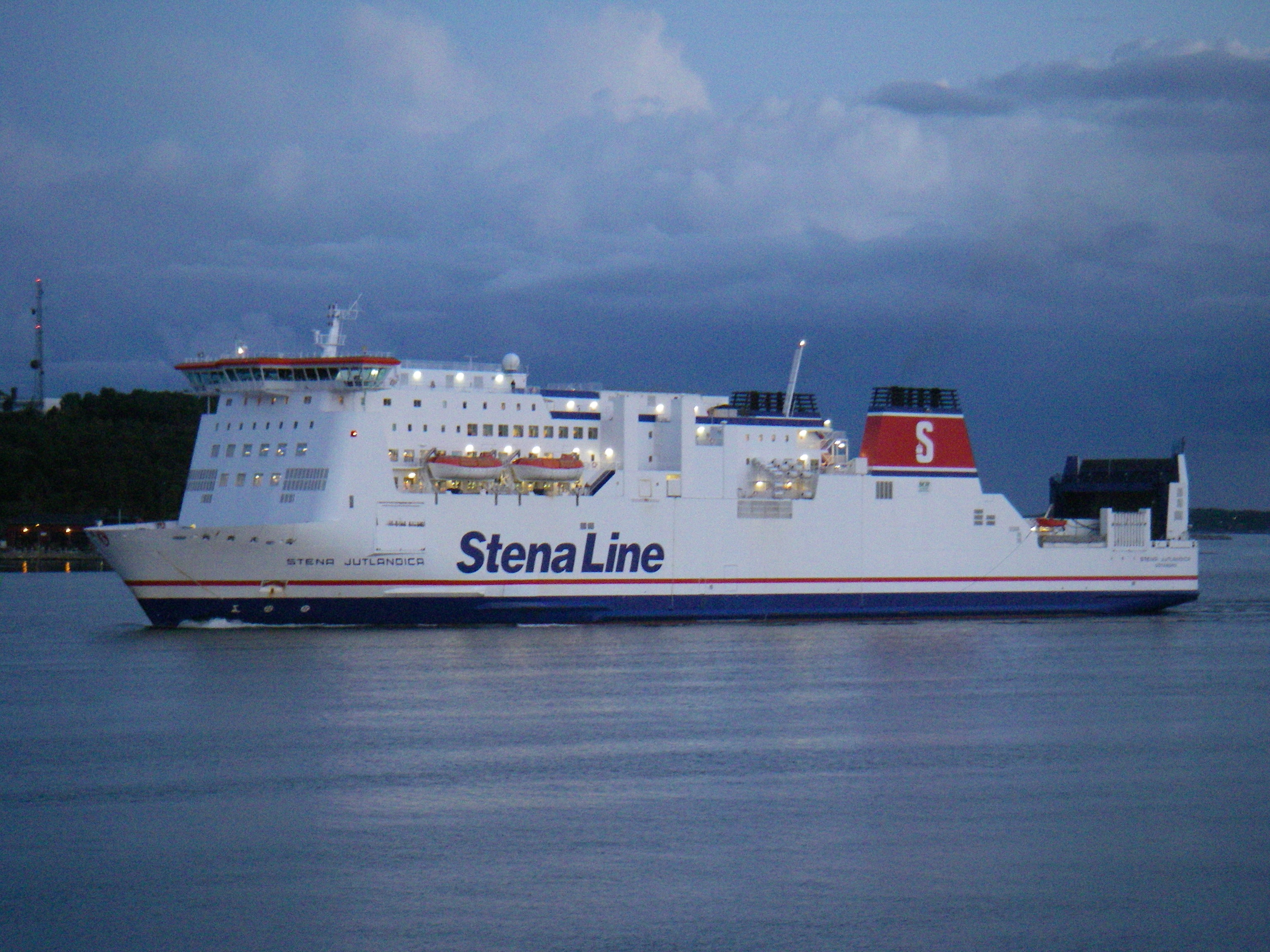
Stena Jutlandica in Gothenburg

In 1996, Stena Line introduced its 20,000 tonne HSS (High-speed Sea Service) vessels, which operated: Belfast–Stranraer; Holyhead–Dún Laoghaire and Hook of Holland–Harwich. In addition to the three 1,500-passenger HSS vessels, Stena Line ordered two smaller 900-passenger HSS vessels to operate on the Gothenburg–Frederikshavn route. Due to the bankruptcy of the shipyard, only the first of these vessels was ever completed.

=== English Channel ===
In 1998, Stena's operations from Dover and Newhaven formed a joint venture with P&O European Ferries as P&O Stena Line, owned 40% and 60% respectively. In 2002, P&O acquired all of Stena's shares in the company, thus becoming the sole owner of P&O Stena Line, which soon changed its name to P&O Ferries.

=== Further expansion ===
In 2000, Stena Line purchased yet another Scandinavian ferry operator: Scandlines AB.

In November 2006, Stena ordered a pair of "super ferries" with a gross tonnage of 62,000 from Aker Yards, Germany for delivery in 2010, with an option for two more ships of the same design. The new ferries will be amongst the largest in the world, to be operated on Stena's North Sea route from Hook of Holland to Harwich. The existing ships from the North Sea were to be moved to the Kiel–Gothenborg route, whereas the ships from Kiel would transfer to the Gdynia to Karlskrona route. The new ferries were launched in 2010, with Stena Hollandica entering service on 16 May 2010, and Stena Britannica planned to enter service in 2010.

=== Acquisitions and closures ===
- 2008, May – The company moved its Belfast Terminal from Albert Quay to the new VT4. This has reduced the length of the crossing to Stranraer by ten minutes.
- 2009, July – Stena Line announced that it had repurchased its former ship, Stena Parisien, from SeaFrance. The ship was renamed Stena Navigator after a comprehensive refit. She was then introduced on the Stranraer to Belfast route, alongside HSS Stena Voyager and Stena Caledonia.
- 2010, December – Stena Line announced it had acquired the Northern Irish operations of DFDS Seaways. The sale includes the Belfast to Heysham & Birkenhead routes, two vessels from the Heysham route (Scotia Seaways & Hibernia Seaways) and two chartered vessels from the Birkenhead route (Mersey Seaways & Lagan Seaways). The Fleetwood to Larne route ended on 24 December 2010.
- 2011, 21 November – Stena Line introduced the Stena Superfast VII and Stena Superfast VIII to replace the Stena Navigator and Stena Caledonia on the Belfast–Cairnryan route. It was announced that the Stena Voyager would be removed from service on 20 November 2011. It was later sold to Stena Recycling and sent for scrapping in May 2013. The two new vessels were initially chartered from Tallink before Stena bought them in 2017.
- 2014, 26 February – it was announced that Stena Line would acquire Celtic Link Ferries service from Rosslare to Cherbourg, France. It was also agreed to take over the charter of their vessel Celtic Horizon, which was renamed Stena Horizon.
- 2019, February – A joint venture with Hyundai Glovis has been announced and approved by the European Commission, for the implementation of a new cooperative short sea intra-European waters service in between the two carriers, for the sea transport of transhipment cargo originating from South Korea.
- 2020, 14 March – due to the Coronavirus outbreak, the company suspended operations between Oslo and Frederikshavn temporarily until further notice due to travel restrictions in Denmark and Norway, the routes sole ship the MS Stena Saga was sent to Gothenburg where she arrived on 16 March 2020 where the company later confirmed it would be making 950 redundancies in Sweden as a result of Coronavirus. The company then later announced on 19 March 2020 that it was going to permanently suspend and close operations on the Oslo–Frederikshavn service due to the lack of profitability, where Stena announced that due to Coronavirus it was unlikely able to see it turn a profit during the whole year when the service is totally dependent on the summer season. The future of Stena Saga remains uncertain and remained laid up in Gothenburg (since end of 2021 she has been anchored near Manila, Philippines).
- 2020 – 2021 – After being replaced by two new e-flexers, MV Stena Embla and MV Stena Edda, on the Belfast to Birkenhead route MV Stena Mersey and MV Stena Lagan proceeded to Tuzla, Turkey for a major refit. This included lengthening by 36 metres (118 ft), adding full drive through capabilities on two decks, full interior renovation and adding fuel scrubbers to reduce emissions. They entered service on the Nynäshamn to Ventspils route as MV Stena Baltica and MV Stena Scandica respectively.
- 2021, February – May – Due to a shift in travel demand, MV Stena Estrid swapped with MV Stena Horizon giving additional capacity to the Rosslare to Cherbourg route. This is after MV Stena Estrid operated a temporary route between Dublin and Cherbourg in January 2021.
- 2021, April – Stena introduced MV Stena Livia, which has been owned by Stena RoRo since 2012, on the Nynäshamn to Ventspils route alongside sister ship MV Stena Flavia. Later in the year they were transferred to the Travemünde to Liepāja route after being replaced by the newly refurbished MV Stena Baltica and MV Stena Scandica.
- 2021, June – July – Due to a shift in travel demand, MV Stena Estrid operated a temporary route between Holyhead and Belfast.
- 2022, 1 February – Stena introduced the Nynäshamn – Hanko route initially with MV Urd as a cargo vessel then additionally with MV Stena Gothica from May 2022.
- 2023, 30 June – Stena transferred MV Stena Vision to their Rosslare to Cherbourg route, greatly increasing the passenger capacity and doubling the passenger sailings on the route. She replaced the chartered freight vessel MV Seatruck Panorama. She was replaced by the new MV Stena Ebba on her previous route Karlskrona to Gdynia.
- 2023, 9 October – Stena announced they will be closing the Nynäshamn to Hanko on 20 October 2023, with the vessels being transferred within their fleet or going up on the charter market.
- 2023, October – Stena bought MV Frijsenborg, renaming her MV Stena Forwarder during a refit in Ostend. She entered service on the Birkenhead to Belfast route on 2 November 2023, replacing MV Stena Foreteller.
- 2023, 15 December – Stena confirmed their intention to open a Dublin to Birkenhead route, replacing the P&O's service which they ceased operating on 21 December 2023 with MV Norbank. On 19 February 2024, Stena Line initiated its new freight-only route from Dublin to Birkenhead, the Stena Horizon will be temporarily used on this route as a permanent vessel solution is being considered. MV Bore Song was introduced on the route from mid April 2024.
- 2024, 8 March – Stena announced that they sold MV Urd to Sea Lines for an undisclosed amount. Delivery is to take place in May 2024 for services between Turkey and Romania.
- 2024, 8 April – Stena Line acquired 49% of the shares in Africa Morocco Link (AML) from Attica Group, expanding them outside of Europe. They operate the routes Tanger Med, Morocco to Algeciras, Spain and Tangier Ville, Morocco to Tarifa, Spain.
- 2024, May – Stena RoRo signed a contract to convert MV Stena Foreteller and MV Stena Forerunner to install an extra cargo deck and thruster power. This will add 30% additional capacity for each vessel. MV Stena Foreteller sailed for Weihai, China on 14 February 2025, she arrived on 26 March 2025 and then re entered service on 25 July 2025, allowing MV Stena Forerunner to head for her conversion.
- 2024, September – MV Stena Gothica was sold to Universal Maritime and renamed MV Gothica for service in the Mediterranean Sea.
- 2024, 10 September – MV Stena Vision will be removed from the Rosslare to Cherbourg route due to lack of demand from 27 October 2024.
- 2024, 7 December – Due to the closure of Holyhead port all sailings to Dublin are cancelled, initially until 13 Dec then to 20 Dec then to 15 January 2025 with additional routes running out of Dublin to Fishguard with MV Stena Adventurer, Birkenhead with MV Stena Estrid, and Heysham with chartered MV Ben My Chree. The closure of the port was due to storm damage from Storm Darragh which damaged part of the pier at terminal 3.
- 2024, 16 December – It was announced that MV Stena Vinga will be chartered to DFDS for their new route to Jersey after winning the tender for it. She began service on 28 March 2025.
- 2025, 21 March – It was announced that MV Stena Livia had been sold to Strait NZ Bluebridge for service on the Cook Strait from August 2025. From 25 April MV Stena Horizon will take over from her on the Travemünde – Liepāja route with MV Stena Vision taking her previous post on the Cherbourg – Rosslare route from 17 April after relieving the chartered MV Patria Seaways.
- 2025, 30 June – It was announced that the Rosslare to Cherbourg route would be withdrawn due to lack of demand from 30 September 2025.
- 2025, 4 November – Wasaline was acquired by Stena Line along with their route between Umeå, Sweden and Vaasa, Finland. The vessel, MV Aurora Botnia, will continue to be owned by a company owned by the two cities she operates to. They took over the operations from 9 February 2026.
- 2025, 21 November – MV Stena Vision was sold to Corsica Sardinia Ferries, being renamed Mega Serena.
- 2026, 3 February – Stena announced that they will cease operating the Halmstad to Grenå route from 30 April 2026 due to challenges to achieve profitability on the route. Due to this, MV Stena Nautica was sold to Eckero Link in May 2026 and renamed to MV Eckero Link.
- 2026, 5 May – MV Stena Vinga was sold to DFDS, after being chartered to them for over a year, she was renamed MV Corbiere Seaways in November 2026 after a public vote.
- 2026, 23 September – Stena announced that they have ordered two new hybrid diesel electric 2.0 E-Flexers for the Gothenburg to Frederikshavn route to be in service from 2030. They are the 16 and 17 E-Flexers ordered by Stena RoRo and are designed to carry 1,400 passengers and 2,720 lane metres of freight vehicles.
- 2026, 15 October – Stena bought MV Somerset, a freight vessel that they had previously chartered, for the Dublin to Birkenhead service, to be renamed MV Stena Freighter. This will displace the MV Stena Scotia and MV Stena Hibernia to the Rotterdam to Harwich service so that the two chartered freight vessels, MV Thuleland and MV Mistral, can be put back to their owners. This will all happen at the end of 2026, when the charters of the later two vessels finish, meaning they will no longer have any vessels being long term chartered to them. This was changed to have MV Stena Hibernia kept at Dublin and MV Stena Freighter going to Harwich alongside MV Stena Scotia.
- 2026, 26 October – Color Line was acquired by Stena AB. All vessels and routes will continue under the Color Line brand for the time being.

== Routes ==
=== Irish Sea ===
- Belfast – Cairnryan: Stena Superfast VII, Stena Superfast VIII
- Belfast – Heysham: Stena Futura, Stena Connecta
- Belfast – Birkenhead: Stena Edda, Stena Embla, Stena Forwarder
- Dublin Port – Birkenhead: Stena Hibernia (not 30 Sept to 30 Nov 2026), Stena Scotia (until Jan 2027)
- Holyhead – Dublin Port: Stena Adventurer, Stena Estrid
- Fishguard – Rosslare: Stena Nordica

=== North Sea ===
- Hook of Holland – Harwich: Stena Britannica, Stena Hollandica
- Hook of Holland – Immingham: Stena Transit, Stena Transporter
- Rotterdam – Harwich: Thuleland (until 7 Dec 2026), Mistral (until Jan 2027), Stena Freighter (from 7 Dec 2026), Stena Scotia (from Jan 2027)
- Rotterdam – Immingham: Stena Foreteller, Stena Forerunner

=== Scandinavia ===
- Gothenburg – Frederikshavn: Stena Jutlandica, Stena Danica
- Gothenburg – Kiel: Stena Germanica, Stena Scandinavica
- Trelleborg – Rostock: Mecklenburg Vorpommern, Skåne

=== Baltic Sea ===
- Karlskrona – Gdynia: Stena Estelle, Stena Ebba, Stena Spirit
- Nynäshamn – Ventspils: Stena Scandica, Stena Baltica
- Travemünde – Liepāja: Stena Flavia, Stena Horizon

=== Charters ===
- Tanger Med – Algeciras (Charter to AML): Stena Europe
- Marsaxlokk – Rades: Stena Forecaster
- Marseille – Genova – Rades (Stena RoRo contract): Stena Shipper
- Barcelona – Palma de Mallorca – Ibiza – Valencia (Charter to Balearia): Kerry
- Port aux Basques – North Sydney (Charter to Marine Atlantic): Ile Rouge

== Fleet ==
=== Current ships ===
Name	Built	Gross Tonnage	Passengers	Notes	Images
Stena Adventurer	2003	43,532	1,500		
Stena Baltica (formerly Stena Mersey)	2005	26,500 (as built); 35,456 (after rebuild)	970	Rebuilt February - December 2021, adding two level drive through, lengthened by 36m and renamed.	
Stena Britannica	2010	64,039	1,200		
Stena Connecta	2026	20,924	12	Launched 24 February 2025. Completed sea trial September 2025. Entered service 23 January 2026. Has 2 rotor sails installed.	
Stena Danica	1983	15,899 (as built); 29,289 (current)	2,274		
Stena Ebba	2022	48,035	1,200	The Fifth E-Flexer Class ship for Stena Line.	
Stena Edda	2019	41,671	927	The second E-Flexer Class ship for Stena Line.	
Stena Embla	2020	41,671	927	The third E-Flexer Class ship for Stena Line.	
Stena Estelle	2022	48,035	1,200	The Fourth E-Flexer Class ship for Stena Line.	
Stena Estrid	2019	41,671	927	The first E-Flexer Class ship for Stena Line.	
Stena Europe	1981	24,828	1,400		
Stena Flavia	2008	26,904	880		
Stena Forecaster	2003	24,688	12		
Stena Forerunner	2003	24,688 (as built); 30,238 (after rebuild)	12	Rebuilt September - November 2025 with an extra trailer deck.	
Stena Foreteller	2003	24,688 (as built); 30,238 (after rebuild)	12	Rebuilt March - June 2025 with an extra trailer deck.	
Stena Forwarder	2016	21,966	12	Bought in October 2023.	
Stena Freighter (formerly Somerset and Spaarneborg)	1999	21,005	12	Previously chartered, bought October 2026.	
Stena Futura	2025	20,835	12	Launched 21 October 2024, sea trials 26 May – 25 June 2025, entered service 22 September 2025.	
Stena Germanica	2001	29,841 (as built); 51,837 (after rebuild)	1,300	Lengthened by 52m March - May 2007.	
Stena Hibernia	1996	13,017	12		
Stena Hollandica	2010	64,039	1,200		
Stena Horizon	2006	27,552	972		
Stena Jutlandica	1996	29,691	1,500		
Stena Nordica	2000	24,206 (as built); 24,263 (after rebuild)	405	Rebuilt in 2023 with more passenger space.	
Stena Scandica (formerly Stena Lagan)	2005	26,500 (as built); 35,456 (after rebuild)	970	Rebuilt August 2020 - May 2021, adding two level drive through, lengthened by 36m and renamed.	
Stena Scandinavica	2003	43,487 (as built); 58,084 (after rebuild)	900 (as built); 1,300 (after build)	Lengthened by 30m January - March 2007.	
Stena Shipper	2012	29,429	12		
Stena Scotia	1996	13,017	12		
Stena Spirit	1988	39,193	1,300		
Stena Superfast VII	2001	30,285	1,200	Stena took ownership from Tallink in December 2017.	
Stena Superfast VIII	2001	30,285	1,200	Stena took ownership from Tallink in December 2017.	
Stena Transit	2011	33,690	300		
Stena Transporter	2011	33,690	300		
Mecklenburg-Vorpommen	1996	37,987	600		
Skåne	1998	42,705	600		
==== Current chartered vessels ====
Mistral	1999	10,471	12		
Thuleland	2006	23,128	12		
==== Recently chartered vessels ====
Patria Seaways	1992	18,332	245	Built as Stena Traveller, owned by Stena line 1992 – 2004.	
Fionia Sea	2009	25,609	12		
Jutlandia Sea	2010	25,609	12		
Bore Song	2011	25,586	12		

On 10 May 2023, Stena has announced that they had ordered two NewMax freight hybrid freight vessels for the Belfast to Heysham route. They are due to begin service in Autumn 2025, giving an 80% boost in capacity to the current ships at 147 metres (482 ft) long with 2,800 lane meters. The NewMax vessels will be methanol powered and have built in electrification including for shore power and battery propulsion.

== Gallery ==
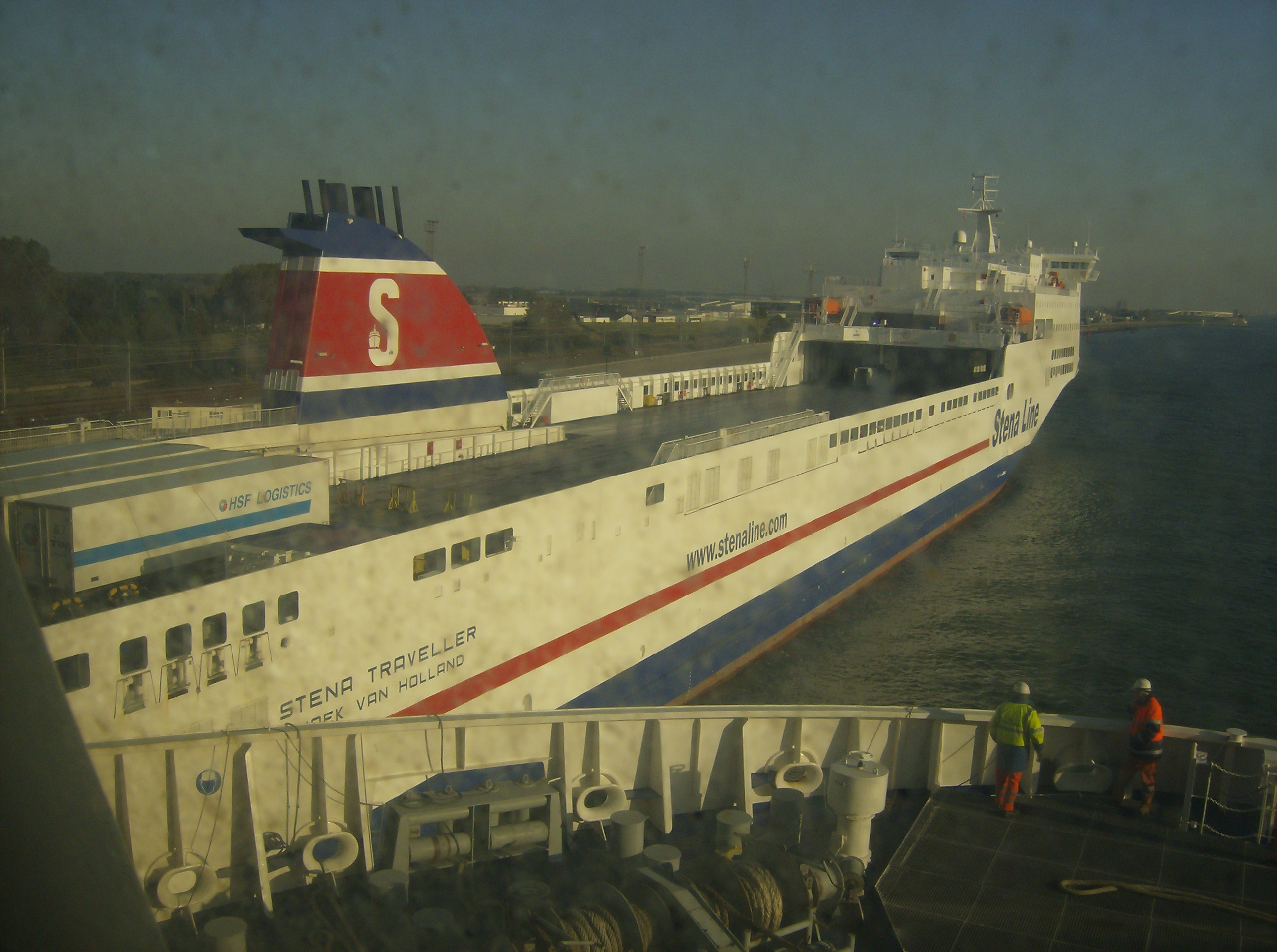
Stena Traveller at the Hook of Holland

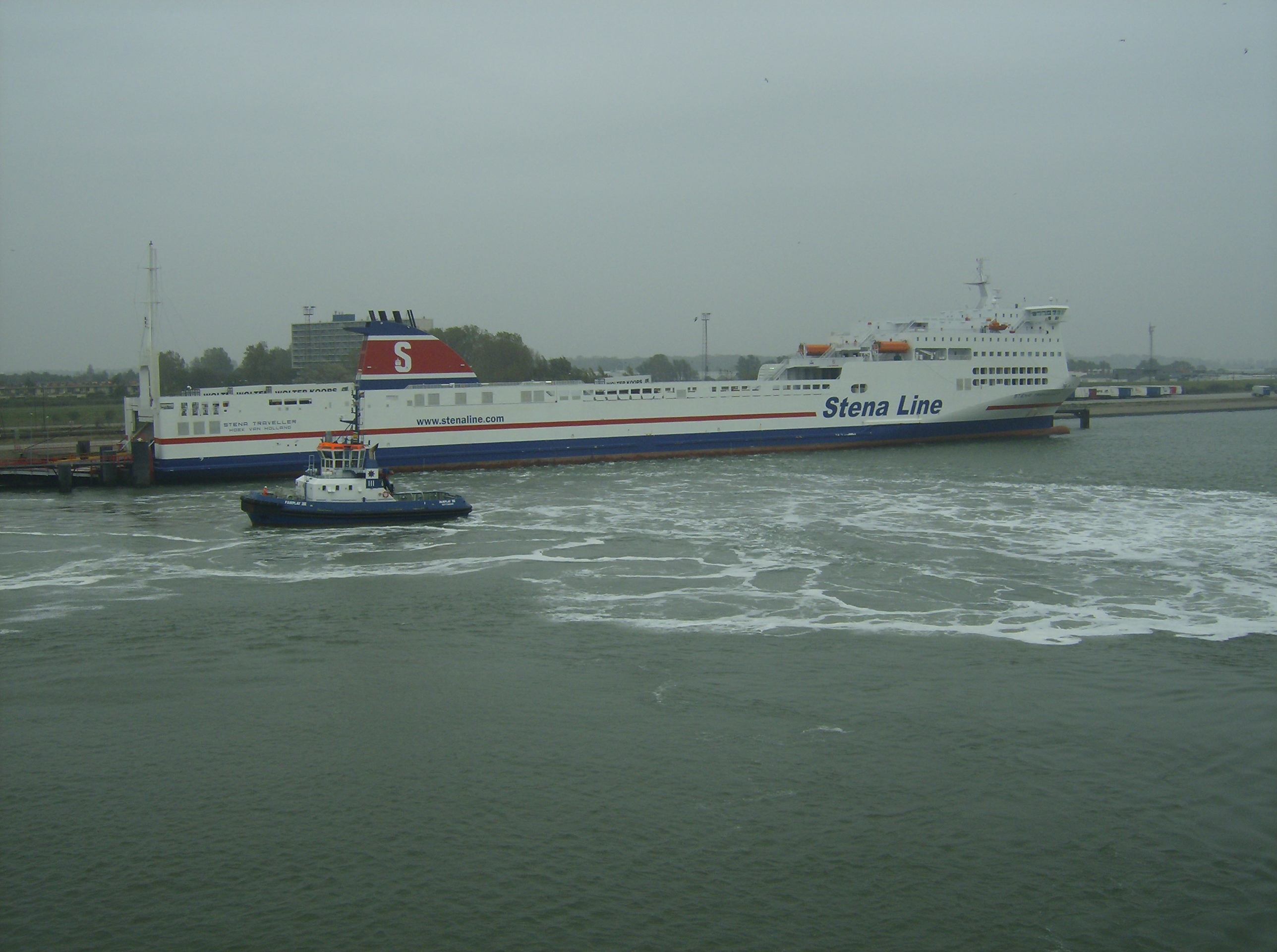
Stena Traveller at the Hook of Holland

== See also ==
- Stena Line Holland BV
- P&O Stena Line
- Hyundai Glovis
