= Finnstar =

Finnstar may refer to two ships operated by Finnlines:

- MS Finnstar (1979), a combination cruise ship/ferry operated 1979–1980
- MS Finnstar, a ropax ferry operated from 2006 onwards
