= Skandinavienkai =

Passenger ship terminal in Lübeck, Germany

Skandinavienkai is one of the five terminals in the Port of Lübeck. The terminal is located in Travemünde, along the river Trave, and is operated by Lübecker Hafen-Gesellschaft. The terminal covers an area of 650,000 m^{2} (7,000,000 sq ft) and has a depth of more than 9.5 m (31 ft). The terminal specialises in roll-on/roll-off and car ferry traffic and has a total of 11 berths. The total length of the quays is 2,000 m (6,600 ft). The terminal employs 135 people.

Skandinavienkai serves mostly German, Swedish and Finnish vessels, including Finnlines' passenger ferries (Finnstar, Finnmaid, Finnlady, Finnswan, Finnpartner and Finntrader).

The terminal's office and service building was designed by Finnish architect Pekka Salminen.

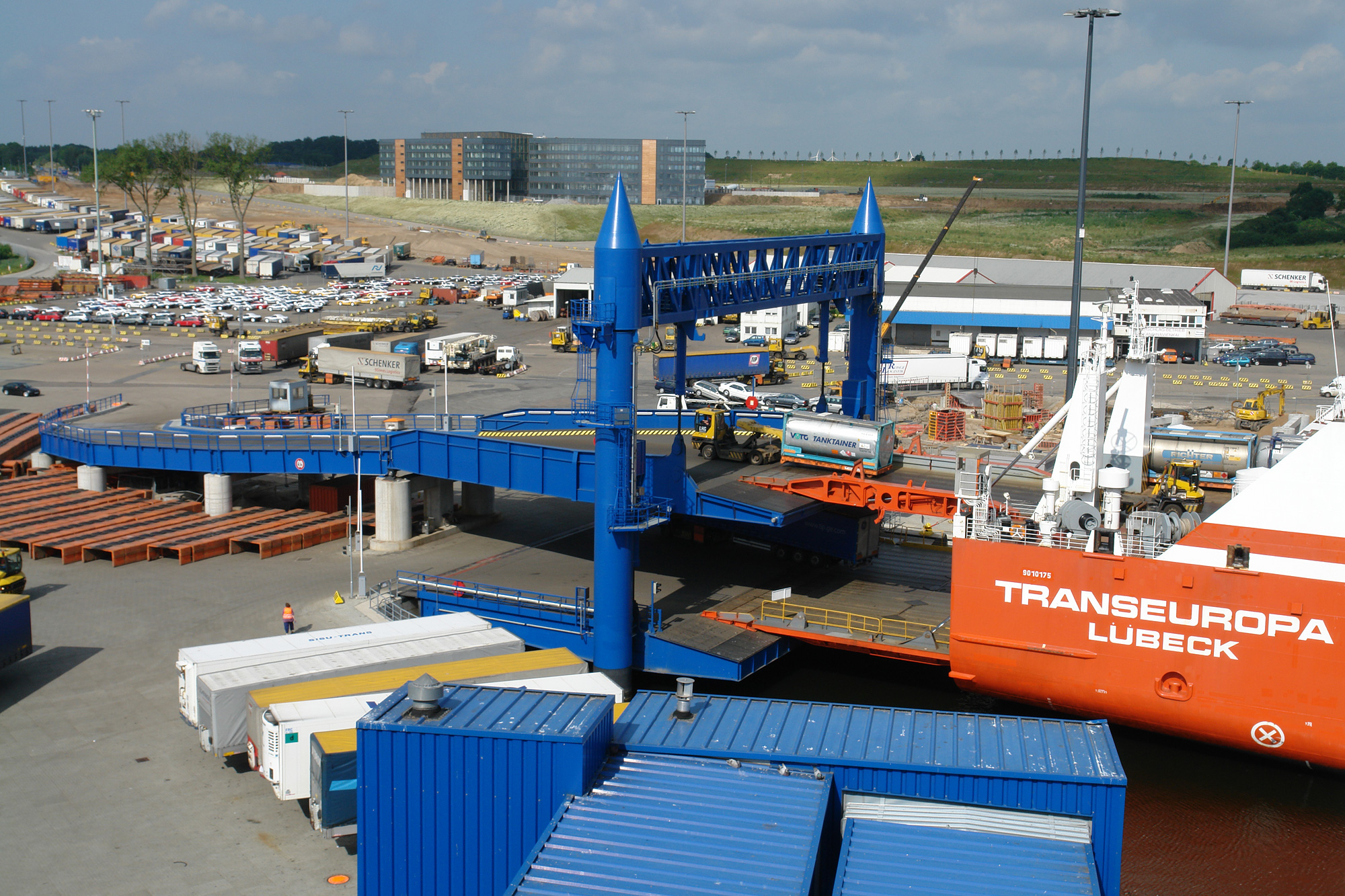
The port area. In the background, a new office and service building.

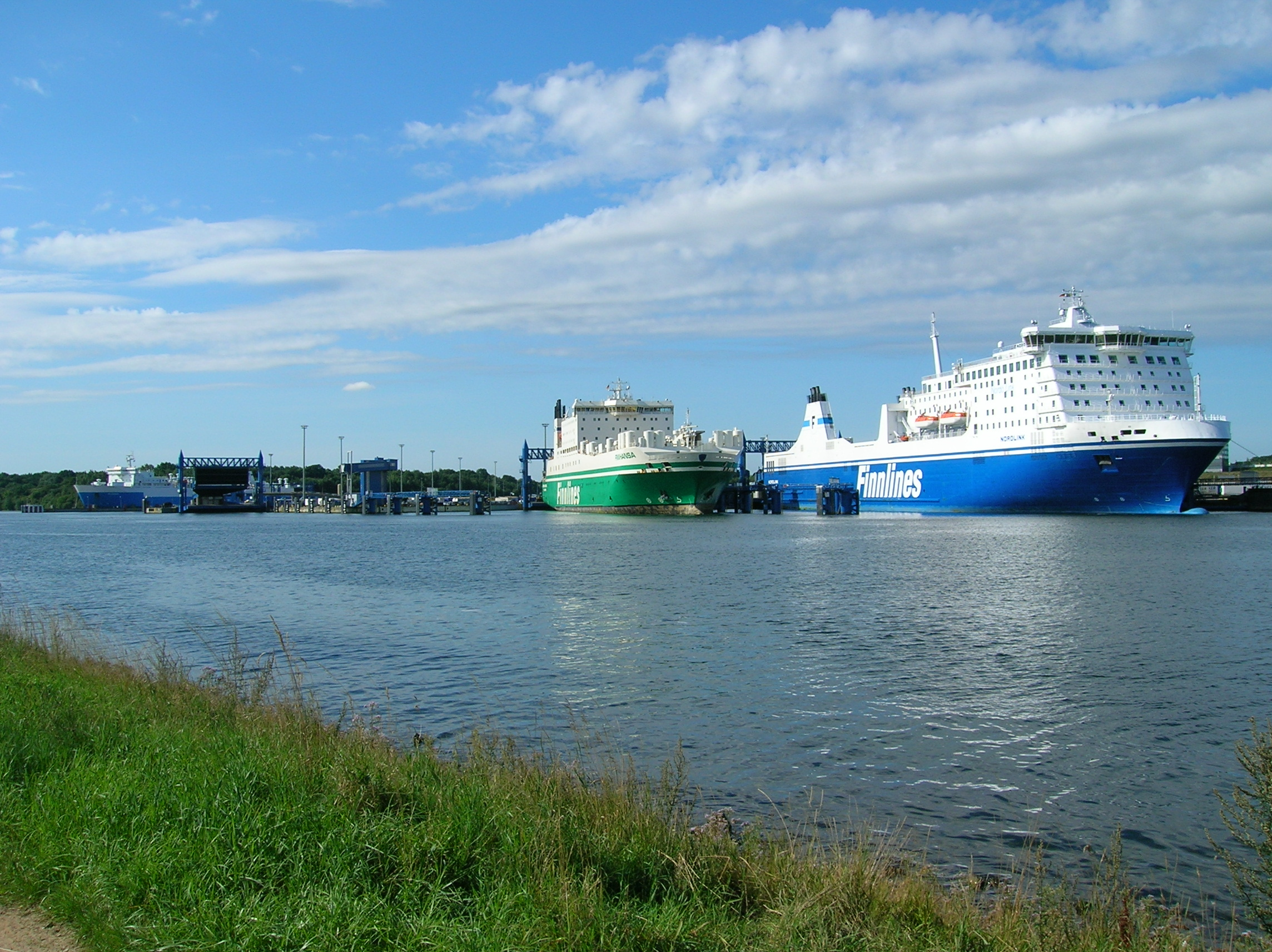
Three Finnlines ferries at Skandinavienkai.

== Ships serving the terminal ==
Company	Ship	Route
(Germany) TT-Line	Nils Holgersson	Travemünde – Trelleborg
(Germany) TT-Line	Peter Pan	Travemünde – Trelleborg
(Finland) Finnlines	Finnlady	Travemünde – Helsinki
(Finland) Finnlines	Finnmaid	Travemünde – Helsinki
(Finland) Finnlines	Finnstar	Travemünde – Helsinki
(Finland) Finnlines	Finnswan	Travemünde – Malmö
(Finland) Finnlines	Finnpartner	Travemünde – Malmö
(Finland) Finnlines	Finntrader	Travemünde – Malmö
(Sweden) Stena Line	Stena Flavia	Travemünde – Liepāja
(Sweden) Stena Line	Stena Livia	Travemünde – Liepāja

== See also ==
- Ferry slip
- Landing (water transport)
- Linkspan
- Ocean liner
