= Finncanopus =

History

Finland
- Name: Finncanopus
- Owner: Finnlines
- Port of registry: Mariehamn, Finland
- Route: Naantali, Finland–Långnäs, Åland Islands–Kapellskär, Sweden
- Ordered: 16 December 2019
- Builder: CSC Jinling, China
- Yard number: W0277
- Laid down: 1 September 2022
- Launched: 30 December 2022
- Completed: 12 December 2023
- In service: 16 February 2023–Present
- Identification: IMO number: 9902421; Call sign: OJUL; MMSI number: 230704000
- Status: In service

General characteristics
- Type: Cruiseferry
- Tonnage: 12,000 GT
- Length: 236 m (774 ft 3 in)
- Beam: 33 m (108 ft 3 in)
- Ice class: 1 A Super
- Installed power: 4 × Wärtsilä 46F
- Speed: 21 knots (39 km/h; 24 mph)
- Capacity: 1,100 passengers

MS Finncanopus is a cruiseferry constructed at CSC Jinling Shipyard, China for the Finland-based ferry company Finnlines. The ship was delivered to her owners on 13 December 2023, and entered service on 16 February 2024.

Finncanopus replaced MS Finnswan on the Naantali-Långnäs-Kapellskär route. Finncanopus is twinned by MS Finnsirius, which entered service in September 2023.
