= MS Finnhansa =

MS Finnhansa may refer to one of two car and passenger ferries owned and operated by Finnlines:

- MS Finnhansa (1966), a 7,820-GRT passenger ferry now named MS Princesa Marissa
- MS Finnhansa (1994), a 32,534-GT combi ro-ro ship still in service with Finnlines
