= Star class =

Star class may refer to:

- Star-class sailboats raced in the summer Olympic Games from 1932 to 2012
- GWR star-class locomotives from the 19th century.
- GWR 4000 class locomotives from the early 20th century.
- Stellar classification
- Star-class destroyer, a class of eight pre–World War I Royal Navy destroyers.
- Star-class ferry, a class of five Ro-pax ferries built by Fincantieri, Italy for Finnlines.
