= MS Stena Germanica (2000) =

Cruiseferry built in 2001

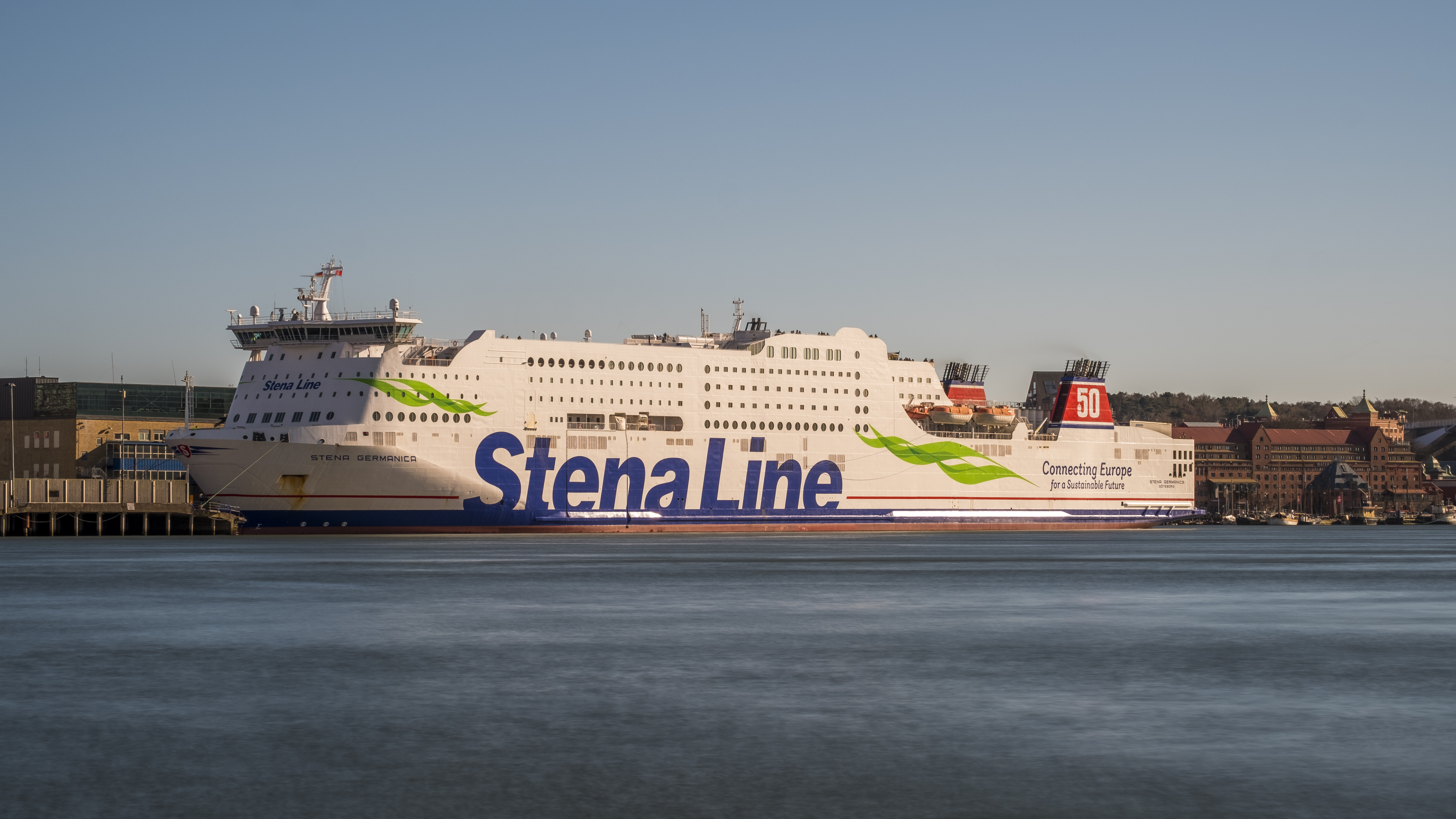
- Stena Germanica berthed on its German terminal at Gothenburg, Sweden.

History
- Name: 2001–2010: Stena Hollandica; 2010: Stena Germanica III; 2010 onwards: Stena Germanica
- Operator: Stena Line
- Port of registry: 2001–2010: Hook of Holland. Netherlands; 2010 onwards: Gothenburg, Sweden
- Route: Gothenburg-Kiel
- Builder: Astilleros Españoles, Spain
- Launched: 6 May 2000
- Identification: IMO number: 9145176; MMSI number: 266331000; Callsign: SLDW
- Status: In service

General characteristics after 2010 rebuild
- Class & type: Seapacer
- Tonnage: 51,837 GT
- Length: 240 m (787 ft 5 in)
- Beam: 29 m (95 ft 2 in)
- Draught: 6.1 m (20 ft 0 in)
- Installed power: 4 x Sulzer 8ZAL40S diesel engines (7727bhp each)
- Propulsion: 2 × Controllable pitch propellers; 3 × Bow thrusters
- Speed: 21.5 knots
- Capacity: 1,300 passengers; 300 cars

Stena Germanica is a large cruiseferry operated by Stena Line between Gothenburg and Kiel, together with the Stena Scandinavica. Between 2001 and 2010, as Stena Hollandica she operated on the Harwich to Hook of Holland service.

== History ==
Stena Germanica was built by Astilleros Españoles shipyard in Puerto Real, Spain. She entered service between Harwich and Hook of Holland on 9 March 2001 as Stena Hollandica.

In January 2007, the high speed ferry Stena Discovery was withdrawn from service. To accommodate the extra traffic the Stena Hollandica was sent to the Lloyd Werft yard in Bremerhaven in March 2007 for lengthening. The vessel was cut in two vertically and a 52-metre section was inserted, making this the biggest enlargement ever made to a RoPax vessel.

In May 2010, Stena Hollandica was replaced on the Harwich–Hook of Holland route by the first of two 62,000 ton superferries. Stena Hollandica underwent an extensive refit at the Remontowa shipyard in Gdańsk, re-entering service in August 2010 on the Gothenburg – Kiel route as Stena Germanica III. She was renamed Stena Germanica a month later.

== Methanol ==
The Stena Germanica is the first major marine vessel to run on recycled methanol after a conversion in 2015 in Poland. Relative to conventional marine bunker fuels, methanol reduces emissions significantly. For reliability purposes, the common rail engine can still run on the marine gas oil as backup. Operation on methanol is expected to reduce SOx emissions by 99%, NOx by 60%, carbon dioxide by 25% and particulate matter by 95%.

== Sister ships ==
Stena Germanica is the last of four Seapacer class ships built by Astilleros Españoles for Stena Line. The first two vessels, Finnclipper and Finneagle were built in 1998 and chartered to Finnish ferry operator Finnlines. The next two vessels, Stena Britannica and Stena Hollandica were built in 2000 and operated by Stena Line themselves.
