= Isla del Rey =

Isla del Rey may refer to:

- Isla del Rey (Chile)
- Isla del Rey (Panama)
- Isla del Rey (Chafarinas), one of the Spanish archipelago of Chafarinas
- Illa del Rei (Isla del Rey in Spanish, historically Hospital Island in English), a small islet off Mahón
- SS Isla Del Rey, a Panamanian cargo ship in service during 1966
