= Wexford (disambiguation) =

Wexford is a town in the south-east of Ireland.

Wexford may also refer to:

== Places ==
- County Wexford, Ireland
- Wexford, Pennsylvania, an outer suburb of Pittsburgh
- Wexford, Toronto, a neighborhood in Toronto, Canada
- Wexford County, Michigan
- Wexford Township, Michigan
- Wexford, Quebec, a township
- Wexford, a neighborhood in Germantown, Maryland

== Constituencies ==
- Wexford (Dáil constituency) (since 1921)
- Wexford (Parliament of Ireland constituency) (pre-1801)
- County Wexford (Parliament of Ireland constituency) (pre-1801)
- Wexford (UK Parliament constituency) (1801–1885)
- County Wexford (UK Parliament constituency) (1801–1885)
- North Wexford (1885–1922)
- South Wexford (1885–1922)

== Ships ==
- Wexford (1802 EIC ship), a ship that made seven voyages for the British East India Company between 1802 and 1817
- SS Wexford, a ship that sank in Lake Huron during the Great Lakes Storm of 1913
- HMS Wexford, a Hunt-class minesweeper built in 1919
- MV Wexford, ROPAX ferry built in 1999, currently sailing for Brittany Ferries

== Other ==
- Inspector Wexford, a character in crime novels by Ruth Rendell
- Wexford Capital, a private equity firm that owns Republic Airways Holdings
