= Ciudad de Soller =

Ferry built in Spain

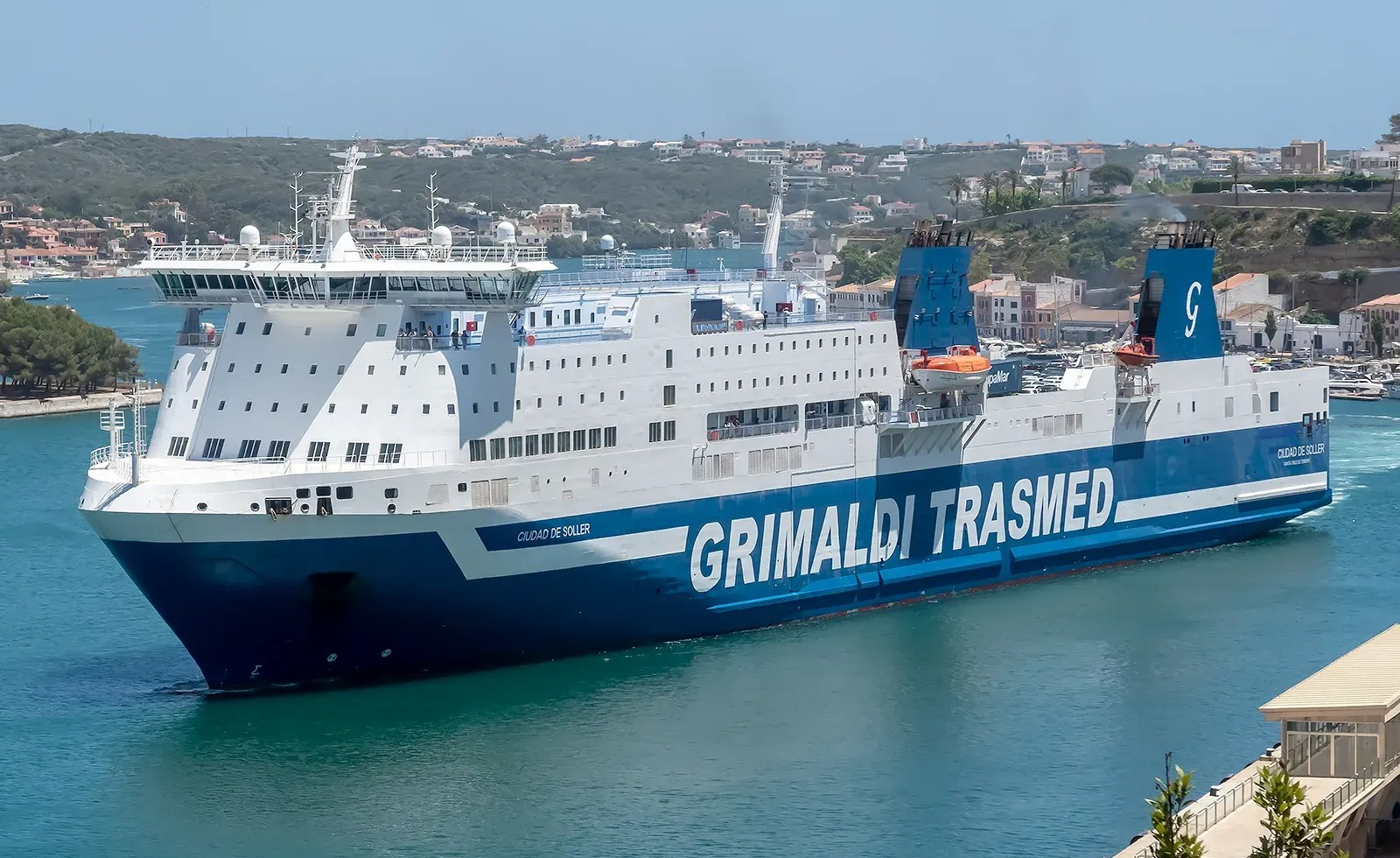
- Ciudad de Soller in Mahon

History
- Name: 1999–2018: Finnclipper; 2018–2021: Rosalind Franklin; 2021–2022: Finnclipper; 2022–2024: Igoumenitsa; 2024–present: Ciudad de Soller
- Owner: 1999: Stena Rederi Ab; 1999–2001: Poseidon Schiffahrts AG; 2001–2022: Finnlines; 2022–2024: Grimaldi Lines; 2024–present: Grimaldi Trasmed
- Operator: 1999–2018: Finnlines / FinnLink / Nordö-Link; 2018–2021: Baleària (charter); 2022–2024: Grimaldi Lines; 2024–present: Grimaldi Trasmed
- Port of registry: 1999–2002: Lübeck, Germany; 2002: Malmö, Sweden; 2002: Lübeck, Germany; 2002–2005: Helsinki, Finland; 2005–2018: Malmö, Sweden; 2018–2021: Limassol, Cyprus; 2021–2022: Malmö, Sweden; 2022–2024: Palermo, Italy; 2024–present: Santa Cruz de Tenerife, Spain
- Route: Valencia ↔ Palma de Mallorca
- Ordered: 6 October 1995
- Builder: Astilleros Españoles; Puerto Real, Spain
- Yard number: 78
- Laid down: 14 February 1997
- Launched: 1 February 1998
- Completed: 19 May 1999
- Acquired: 2024
- In service: 10 June 1999
- Identification: IMO number: 9137997; Call sign: EAHF; MMSI number: 224729000
- Status: in service

General characteristics
- Class & type: Seapacer Class
- Tonnage: 29,841 GT; 8,452 NT; 7,823 DWT
- Length: 188.3 m (617 ft 9 in)
- Beam: 29.3 m (96 ft 2 in)
- Draft: 6.3 m (20 ft 8 in)
- Installed power: 4 × Sulzer 8ZAL40S main diesel engines (total 23,040 kW)
- Speed: 22.0 knots (40.7 km/h; 25.3 mph) (40.74 km/h)
- Capacity: 440 passengers; 193 passenger cabins; 2,500 lane metres for freight

Ciudad de Sóller is a 188.3-metre Seapacer-class Ro-Pax ferry operated by Grimaldi Trasmed on routes connecting mainland Spain with the Balearic Islands. Built in 1999 by Astilleros Españoles in Puerto Real, Spain, the vessel operated under several names, including Finnclipper, Rosalind Franklin, and Igoumenitsa, before receiving her current name in May 2024.

== Service ==
The ferry Finnclipper was ordered in October 1995 by the British firm Stena Ferries Ltd. and built at the Astilleros Españoles shipyard in Puerto Real, Spain. Launched on February 1, 1998, she was delivered on May 19, 1999, to Stena Rederi Ab, before being sold that same day to Poseidon Schiffahrt AG (part of Finnlines) for $81 million. Initially registered in Lübeck, the ship entered service on June 10, 1999, linking Travemünde and Helsinki. In December 2001, she was transferred to the Finnish ship register under Finnlines ownership and re-allocated to Finnlink's Naantali–Kapellskär route in January 2003.

During her early years in the Baltic, the ferry experienced a notable maritime incident. On January 20, 2004, while departing Kapellskär for Naantali with 63 passengers, 28 crew members, and 2,377 tonnes of cargo, she struck a buoy and ran aground on a nearby shoal due to navigational misjudgments and lack of bridge coordination. Despite sustaining bottom hull damage along her entire length, the vessel safely returned to Kapellskär to disembark passengers and cargo. She was subsequently repaired at the Neptun Werft shipyard in Rostock, Germany, before returning to active service in March 2004. Over the following decade, ownership shifted to Swedish entity RoPax I Clipper Ab, and she alternated between Finnlines' subsidiaries on various Baltic routes, including Malmö–Travemünde, Naantali–Långnäs–Kapellskär, and brief deployments connecting Helsinki, Aarhus, Mukran, Ventspils, St. Petersburg, and Rostock–Trelleborg under a short Stena Line charter.

In April 2018, her Baltic career drew to a close when she was chartered to Spanish operator Baleària. Concurrently renamed Rosalind Franklin, the ferry was deployed to the Mediterranean, serving key mainland-to-island routes primarily between Barcelona and Palma de Mallorca until October 2021. She then returned to Malmö, briefly reassumed her original name Finnclipper, and resumed Baltic operations until February 2022. Following a minor, quickly extinguished shipboard fire while docked in Malmö, she departed for Italy to join the Grimaldi Lines fleet as a replacement for Euroferry Olympia. Renamed Igoumenitsa in March 2022, she operated on the Adriatic route between Brindisi, Italy, and Igoumenitsa, Greece.

Her transition to the Spanish cabotage network concluded in early 2024. After concluding her Adriatic service in February 2024, the ferry underwent refitting and transfer to Grimaldi Trasmed in Yalova, Turkey. She initiated service on the routes linking Valencia, Barcelona, and Palma de Mallorca in late March 2024, and on May 21, 2024, she officially raised the Spanish flag under her current name, Ciudad de Soller.

== Sister ships ==
- Vizzavona
- Stena Germanica
- Finnfellow
