= MV Cape Orlando =

Roll-on/roll-off ship built in 1981

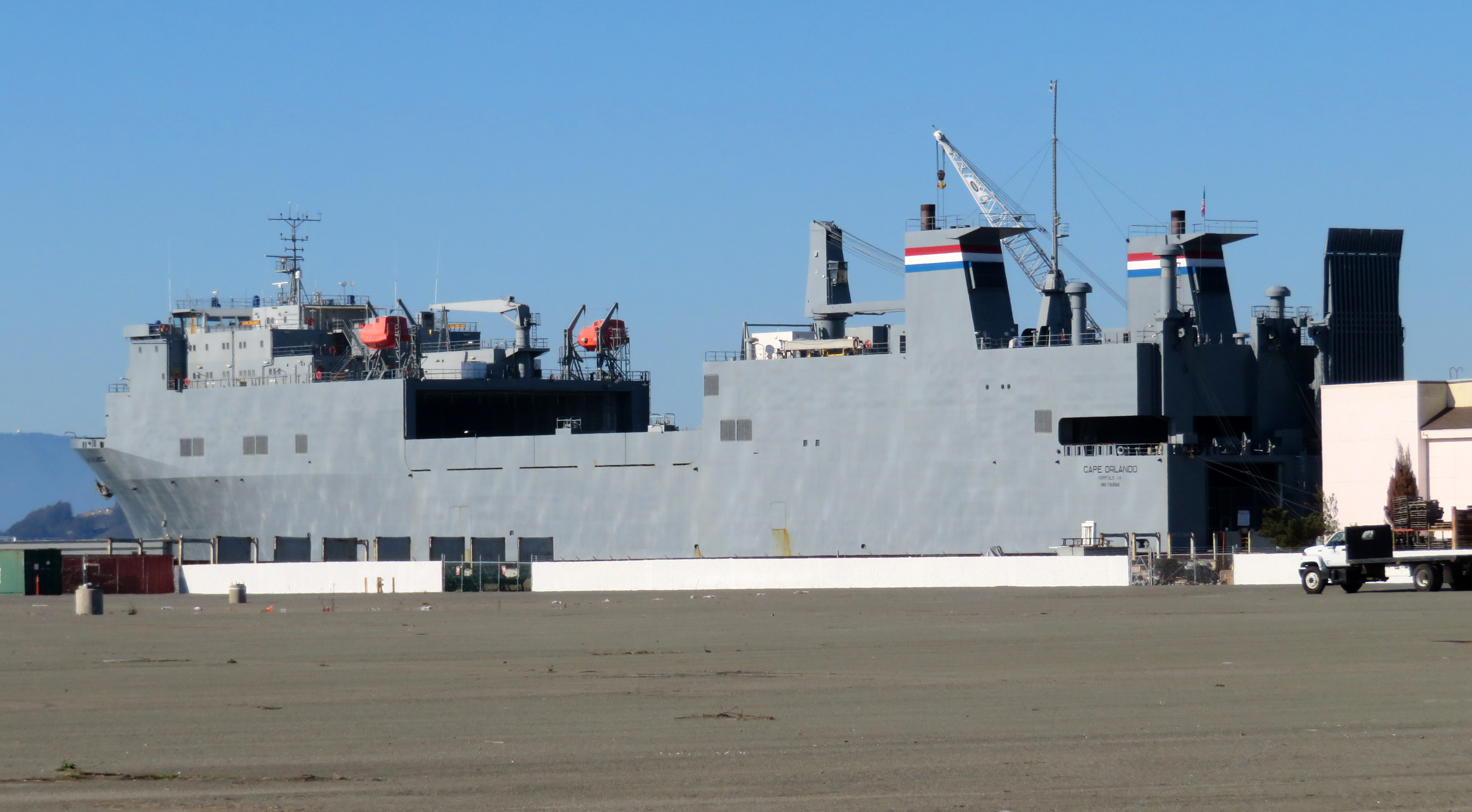
- MV Cape Orlando at Ready Reserve Fleet Alameda in 2018

History

United States
- Name: MV Finneagle
- Namesake: Finland and eagles
- Owner: United States Maritime Administration
- Builder: Kockums Varv Shipyard A.B., Malmö, Sweden
- Laid down: 20 February 1980
- Completed: 18 February 1981
- Renamed: MV Cape Orlando, 12 July 1993
- Identification: IMO number: 7909968; MMSI number: 366773000; Callsign: WFPJ
- Status: Currently underway

General characteristics
- Class & type: Roll-on/roll-off ship
- Displacement: 32,799 LT (33,325 t)
- Length: 635 ft (194 m)
- Beam: 91 ft (28 m)
- Draft: 30 ft (9.1 m)
- Propulsion: Diesel, 2 propellers
- Speed: 16.2 kn (30.0 km/h; 18.6 mph)
- Range: Not disclosed
- Complement: 25 when in active status; 9 when in reserve

The MV Cape Orlando is a roll-on/roll-off ship that is part of the US Ready Reserve Fleet.

The ship keel was laid down on 20 February 1980 under the name MV Finneagle at Kockums Naval Solutions under contract with Finnlines. The Finneagle was delivered to Finnlines on 18 February 1981.

On 28 June 1983, Finnlines sold the Finneagle to Zenit Dry Good Corporation, which renamed it the MV Zenit Eagle. Later in 1983, Zenit sold the MV Zenit Eagle to AutoMar II Corporation, which renamed it the American Eagle. At some point, American Eagle was renamed MV Cape Orlando.

On 14 September 1994, the MV Cape Orlando was chartered under long-term contract to US Department of Transportation and added to the Ready Reserve Fleet on. The ship was used during the Iraq War and the Afghanistan war.

The MV Cape Orlando was stationed at the Ready Reserve Fleet Alameda.

On 3 November 2023, while docked in Oakland, California, Pro-Palestinian protestors, who believed the ship was carrying weapons bound for Israel, demonstrated at the ship. A small group of protestors attempted to board her, but were stopped by ship security. She got underway from Oakland nine hours after her planned departure time.
