= Chinese ship Chang Da Long =

Ship

History

PRC
- Name: Chang Da Long (长达隆)
- Builder: Jinling Shipyard, Nanjing
- Commissioned: 2013
- Home port: Shenzhen
- Identification: IMO number: 9471197; MMSI number: 413473010; Callsign: BUDH
- Status: In service

General characteristics
- Type: roll-on/roll-off
- Displacement: 20,000 long tons (20,000 t)
- Length: 140.5 m (460 ft 11 in)
- Beam: 24.4 m (80 ft 1 in)
- Depth: 10.42 m (34 ft 2 in)
- Deck clearance: 3.5 m (11 ft 6 in) max
- Propulsion: Marine Diesel
- Electronic warfare & decoys: None
- Armament: Unarmed
- Armour: None
- Aircraft carried: None
- Aviation facilities: helicopter deck

The Chinese roll-on/roll-off ship Chang Da Long (长达隆) is a military/civilian dual use cargo ship built in the People’s Republic of China (PRC) for the People's Liberation Army Navy (PLAN). Built by Jinling Shipyard (金陵) at Nanjing, the ship begun sea trials in November 2012, and first entered civilian service in the following year.

Chang Da Long is a pure car and truck carrier (PCTC), capable of carrying 2200 cars at its maximum capacity. Out of its eight decks, the maximum clearance of third and fifth decks is 4.5 meter, enable it to carry bulk equipment and large vehicles. The ship is also equipped with helicopter deck, and is able to transport two fully equipped mechanized battalions. Usually deployed as a PCTC for civilian use in peace time, the ship will be activated during national emergency for governmental and military mission, with this role first successfully performed in a military exercise in 2015. Specification:

- Length: 140.5 meter
- Beam: 24.4 meter
- Tonnage: 20000 gross ton

Name (English)	Name (Han 中文)	Tonnage (t)	Commissioned	Status
Chang Da Long	长达隆	20000	2013	Active
