= Hakuni =

A number of ships have carried the name Hakuni, including:

- SS Hakuni, a Finnish cargo ship in service 1959–66
- Finnish transport Hakuni (FNS 731), a Hauki-class transport ship
