= MS Finntide =

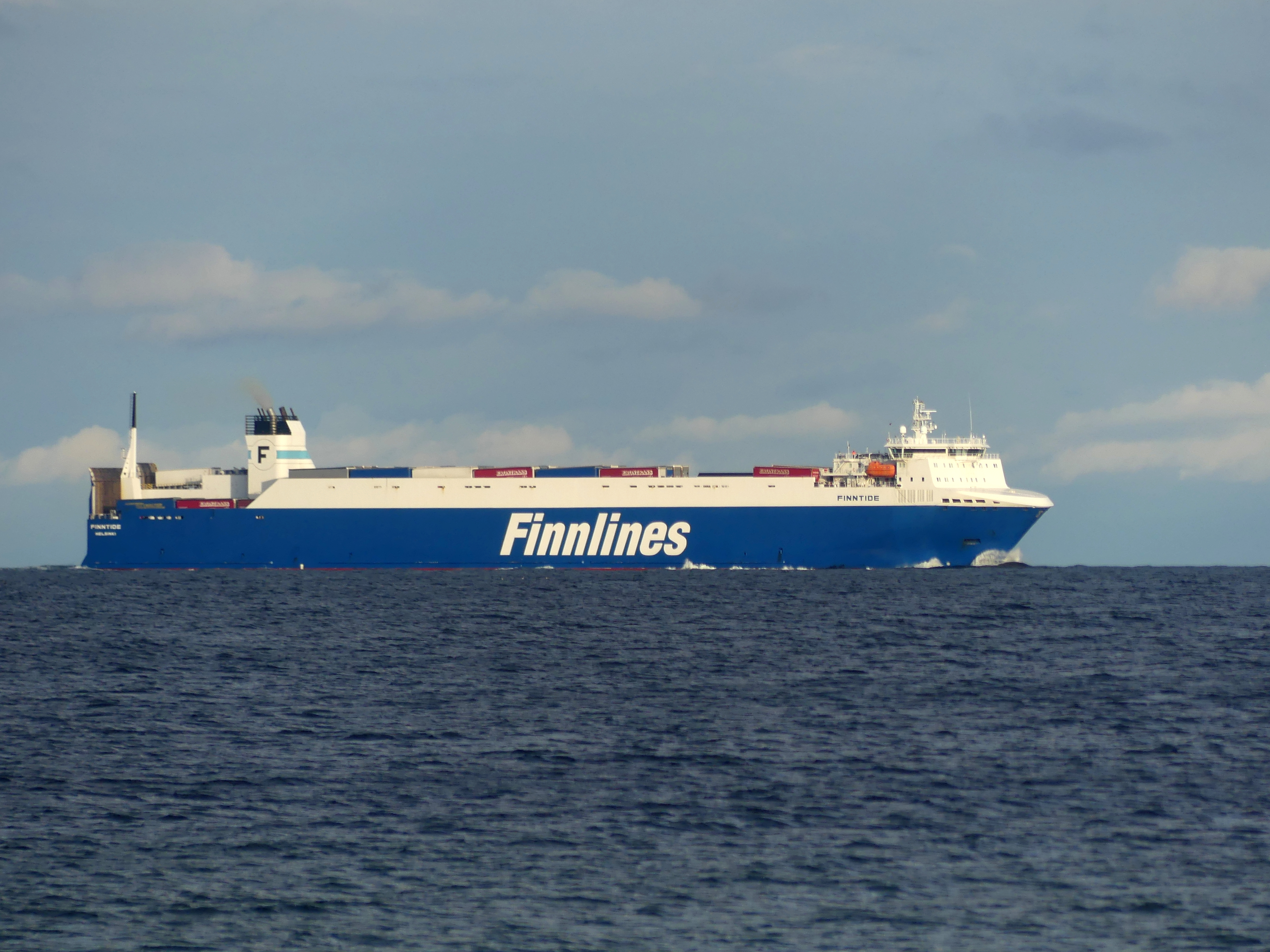
- Finntide sails to Gdynia

History
- Name: Finntide
- Operator: Finnlines
- Port of registry: Helsinki
- Builder: CSC Jinling (2012); Lengthened by 29.50 m, Gdańsk Ship Repair Yard, Gdansk - Poland (2018)
- Yard number: JLZ07-0442
- Completed: 2012
- Identification: Call sign: OJPS; IMO number: 9468920
- Fate: Scrapped 2012

General characteristics
- Class & type: Breeze
- Tonnage: 33,816 GT; 14.509 DWT
- Length: 21,787 m (71,479 ft 8 in)
- Beam: 265 m (869 ft 5 in)
- Draught: 6.9 m (22 ft 8 in)
- Decks: 2
- Ramps: 2
- Ice class: 1A
- Installed power: 2x10000 kw (27.192 KM)
- Speed: 21.0 knots (38.9 km/h; 24.2 mph)

MS Finntide was a roll-on/roll-off built by CSC Jinling, China at shipyards for Finnlines. They are used on Finnlines' routes connecting Finland to Germany and Sweden to Germany.

== History ==
The Finntide was built at the Chinese shipyard CSC Jinling under the number JLZ07-044 and was launched in 2012. The ship has two loading ramps for cars, can take 470 containers, is equipped with two eight-cylinder Wärtsilä 8L46F engines with an output of 10,000 kW. The engines drive two controllable-pitch propellers and enable a speed of up to 21 knots. docking and undocking maneuvers are assisted by a maneuvering thrusters. In 2017, the Finntide underwent so-called ship lengthening at the Gdańsk Ship Repair Yard. At the shipyard, after strength and stability calculations were carried out by shipyard engineers, the ship was cut into two parts, a new section was inserted between these parts, and the two were joined using the welding method. As a result of the reconstruction, the ship, previously 188.37 m long, was lengthened by 29.5 m, thus increasing the cargo space by 30% and reducing fuel consumption per cargo unit. Finntide handles cargo and truck transport most often between ports on the route Uusikaupunki – Turku - Travemünde, Helsinki - Rostock - Aarhus, also sails from Finland to Poland between the ports of Hanko – Gdynia - Hanko.
