= MS Finnfellow =

Ropax ferry operating for Finnlines

- Finnfellow at Świnoujście

History
- Name: 2000-3: Stena Brittanica; 2003 onwards: Finnfellow
- Operator: 2000-3: Stena Line; 2003 onwards: Finnlines
- Port of registry: Malmo, Sweden
- Route: Świnoujście - Malmo
- Builder: Astilleros Espanoles
- In service: 2000
- Identification: IMO number: 9145164

General characteristics (as built)
- Class & type: Ferry
- Tonnage: 33,724 GT
- Length: 188.3 m (617 ft 9 in)
- Beam: 28.7 m (94 ft 2 in)
- Draught: 6 m (19 ft 8 in)
- Installed power: 4 × Sulzer 8ZAL40S
- Speed: 22 knots (41 km/h; 25 mph)
- Capacity: 452 passengers; 2,459 lane meters

General characteristics (after 2005 rebuilt)
- Length: 189.7 m (622 ft 5 in)
- Capacity: 452 pax; 2,918 lm
- Notes: otherwise as built

MS Finnfellow is a ropax ferry operating for Finnlines between Świnoujście and Malmo.

== History ==
Built in Puerto Real as Stena Brittanica for Stena Line's Harwich - Hoek van Holland operation, which she served alongside her sister Stena Hollandica, the ship entered service with Finnlines in 2003. She underwent a rebuilt in 2005 and as of 2026 sails on Finnlines' Świnoujście - Malmo route.

== Sisters ==
- Stena Germanica
- Ciudad de Soller
- Vizzavona
