= Vizzavona (ship) =

Ship built in 1999

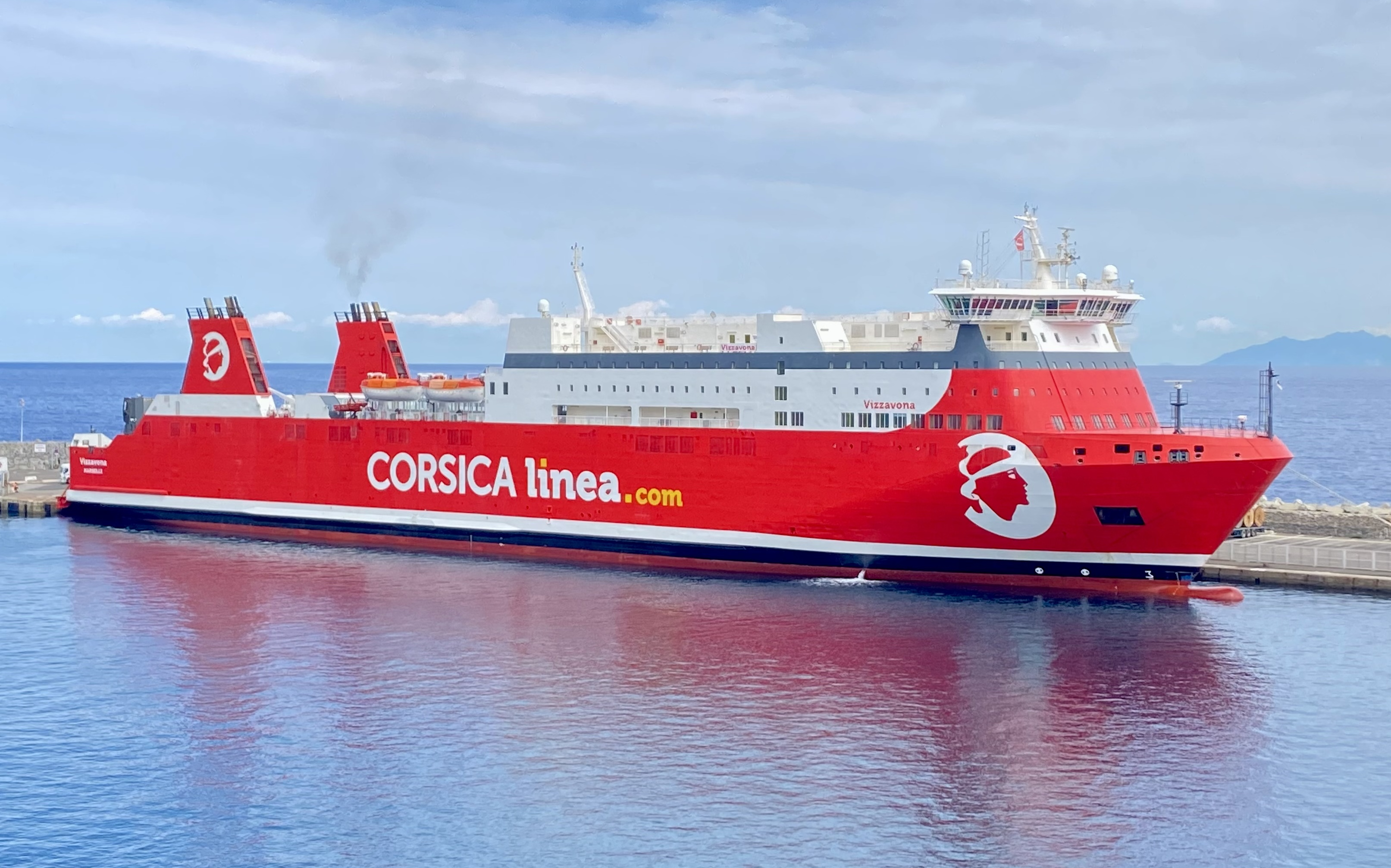
- Vizzavona for Corsica Linea

History

France
- Name: 1999–2017: Finneagle; 2017–2018: Euroferry Corfu; 2018–2026: Vizzavona; 2026–present: Wexford
- Owner: Grimaldi Group
- Operator: 1999–2017: Finnlines; 2015–2018: Grimaldi Lines; 2018–2026: Corsica Linea; 2027–: Brittany Ferries
- Builder: Astilleros Españoles, Puerto Real, Spain
- Yard number: 79
- Home port: 1999: Lübeck, Germany; 1999–2012: Stockholm, Sweden; 2012–2017: Mariehamn, Finland; 2017–2018: Palermo, Italy; 2018–present: Marseille, France
- Identification: IMO number: 9138006

General characteristics

Vizzavona is a Roll-on/roll-off ferry owned by the Grimaldi Group. It has operated for Corsica Linea as the since 2018 between Marseille and Ajaccio/Bastia. In March 2027, it will commence a charter to Brittany Ferries, operating between Rosslare and Cherbourg as a replacement for the Norbay. It will be renamed Wexford.

Her sister-ships are the Stena Germanica, Ciudad de Soller and Finnfellow.
