= Euroferry Olympia =

Ship built in 1995

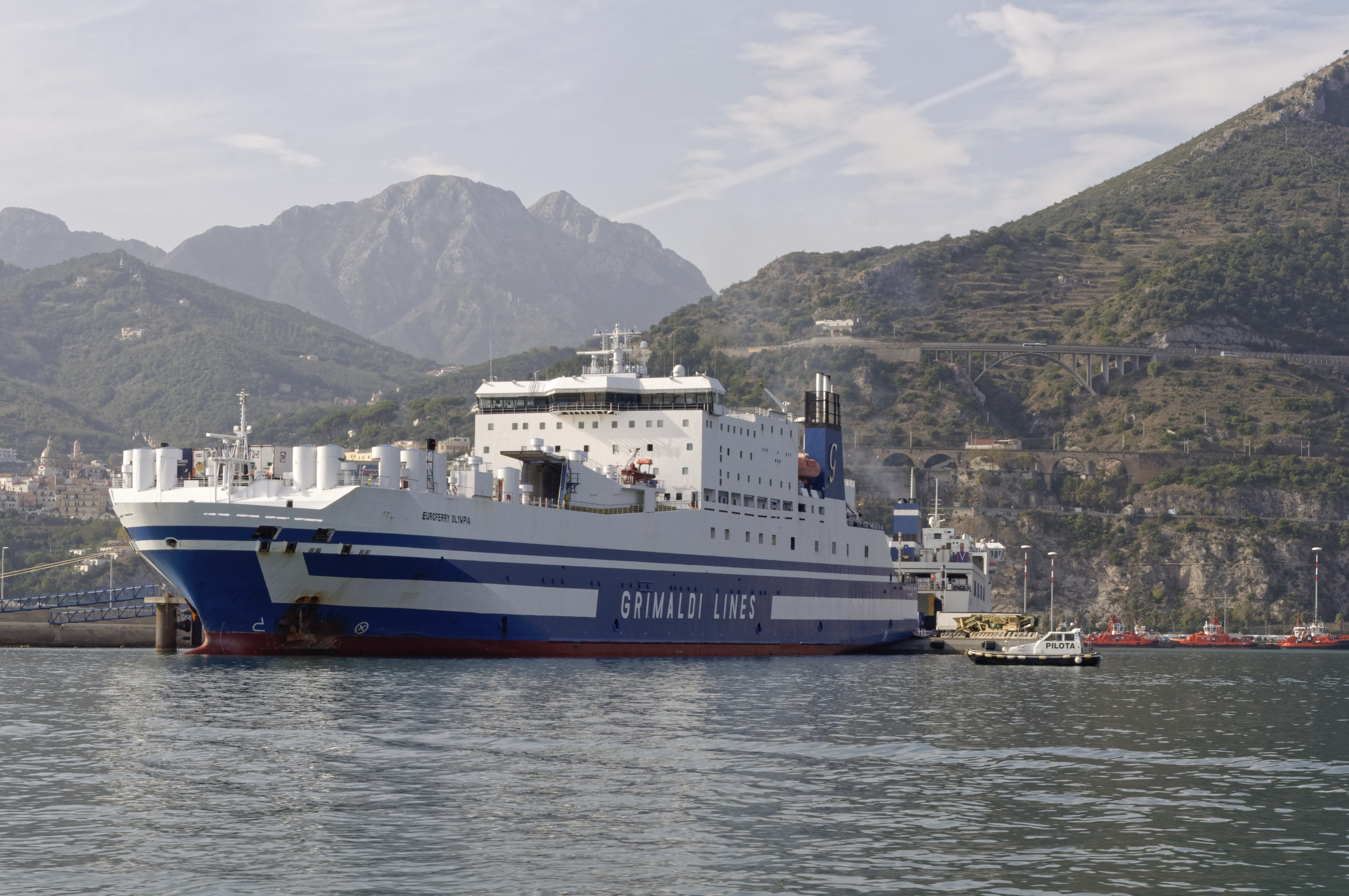
- Euroferry Olympia at Salerno, Italy, in 2019

History
- Name: Transeuropa (1995–2013); Euroferry Olympia (2013–2023)
- Owner: Poseidon Schiffahrt OHG (1995–2000); Finnlines Deutschland (2000–2013); Navigazione Atlantica (2013–2023)
- Operator: Finnlines (1995–2013); Grimaldi Lines (2013–2023)
- Port of registry: Lübeck, Germany (1995–2012); Naples, Italy (2012–2023)
- Route: Lübeck–Helsinki (1995–2000); Helsinki–Travemünde (2001–2007); Lübeck–Saint Petersburg (2007–2009); Lübeck–Mukran–Saint Petersburg (2009); Lübeck–Mukran–Helsinki–Saint Petersburg–Kotka–Lübeck (2009); Lübeck–Rostock–Kotka–Helsinki (2009–2010); Lübeck–Ventspils–Saint Petersburg (2010–2012); Helsinki–Rostock (2012–2013); Ravenna–Igoumenitsa–Patras (2013–2022)
- Builder: Stocznia Gdańska S.A.
- Yard number: B501/03
- Launched: 29 December 1994
- Completed: 1995
- Maiden voyage: 1995
- In service: 12 June 1995
- Out of service: 18 February 2022
- Identification: IMO number: 9010175
- Fate: Caught fire, 18 February 2022 and scrapped in 2023

General characteristics
- Class & type: Hansa-class ferry
- Tonnage: 32,535 GT, 9,761 NT, 11,682 DWT
- Length: 183.00 m (600 ft 5 in)
- Beam: 28.70 m (94 ft 2 in)
- Depth: 6.80 m (22 ft 4 in)
- Installed power: Diesel engine 23,070 kW (30,940 hp)
- Propulsion: Screw propeller
- Speed: 21.3 knots (39.4 km/h; 24.5 mph)
- Capacity: 90 passengers (as built); 600 passengers (after rebuild)

Euroferry Olympia was a Hansa-class ferry operated by the Italian Grimaldi Lines, in service from 1995 until 2022. The ship operated as Transeuropa in the Baltic Sea by the Finnish shipping company Finnlines until November 2013. The new owner Grimaldi operated the ship in the Mediterranean Sea. On 18 February 2022, a major fire broke out on the ship when she was north of Corfu. The vessel was scrapped in 2023.

== Description ==
As built, the ship was 183.00 metres (600 ft 5 in) long overall and 171.30 metres (562 ft 0 in) between perpendiculars, with a beam of 28.70 metres (94 ft 2 in) and a depth of 6.80 metres (22 ft 4 in). She was assessed at 32,535 gross tonnage (GT), 9,761 net tonnage (NT), 11,682 tons deadweight (DWT). The ship was powered by four Zgoda-Sulzer 8ZAL40S diesel engines, together rated at 23,070 kilowatts (30,940 bhp). They drove two screw propellers and could propel the ship at 21.3 knots (39.4 km/h; 24.5 mph). As built, there was capacity for 90 passengers.

== History ==
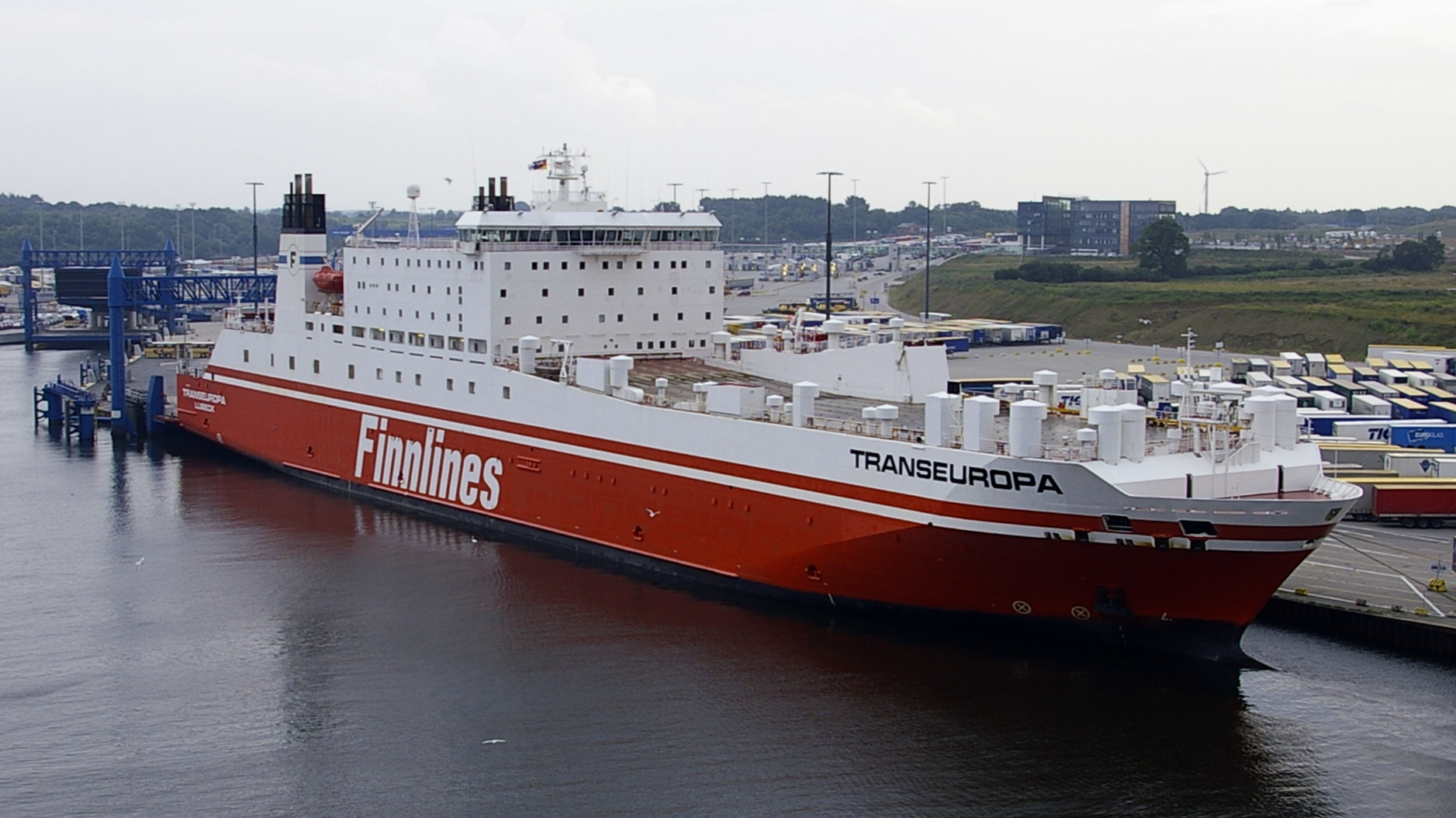
Transeuropa at Travemünde

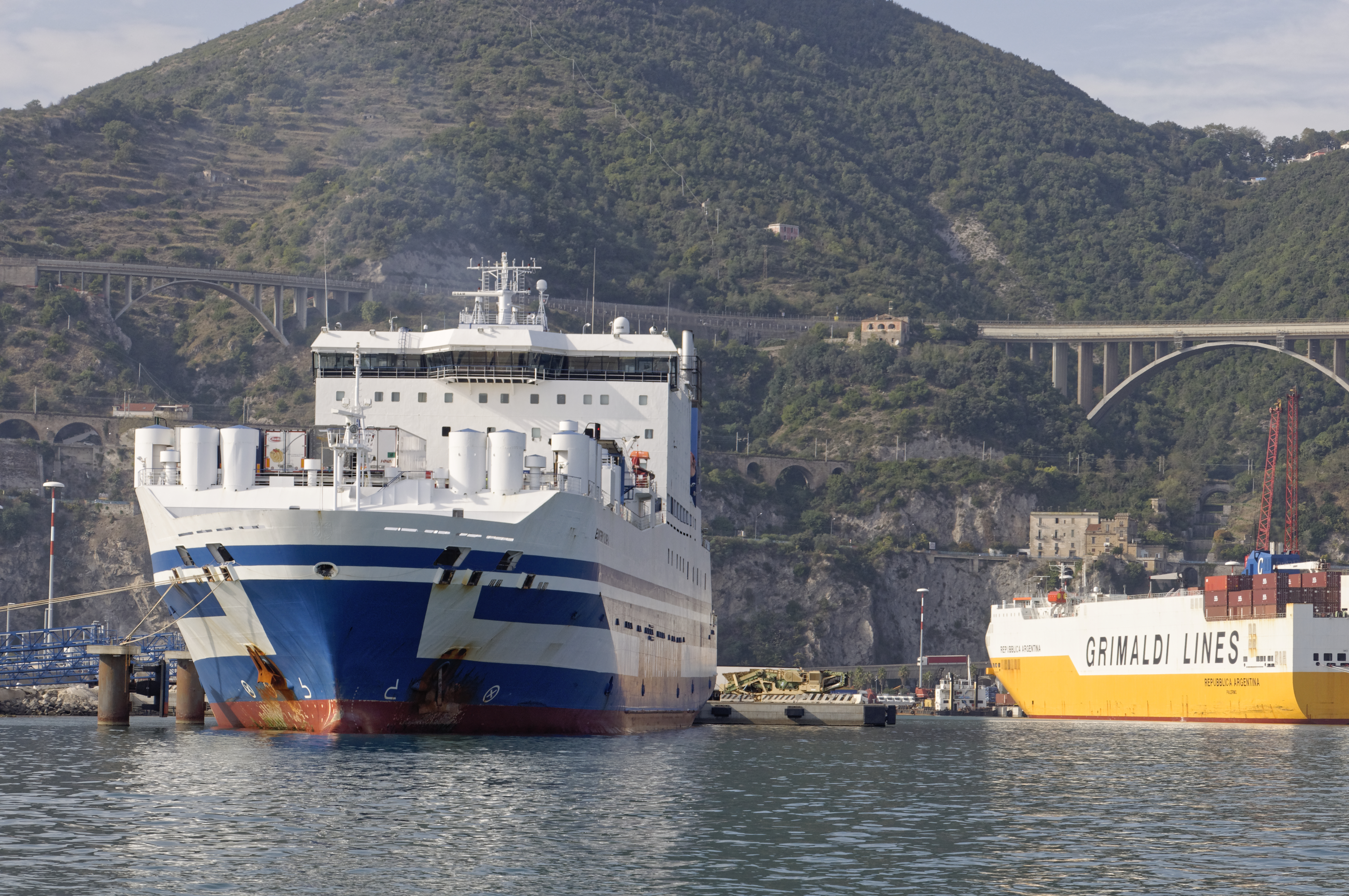
Euroferry Olympia at Salerno, Italy, 2019

The ship was a Hansa-class ferry. It was built as yard number B501/03 by Stocznia Gdańska S.A., Gdańsk, Poland. It was launched as Transeuropa on 29 December 1994 and delivered to Poseidon Schiffahrt OHG, Lübeck, Germany on 31 May 1995. The IMO Number 9010175 was allocated. It entered service on the Lübeck–Helsinki route on 6 December. In 2000, Transeuropa was registered to Finnlines Deutschland, Lübeck, entering service on the Helsinki–Travemünde route on 10 January 2001.

On 6 November 2007, Transeuropa was placed on the Lübeck–Saint Petersburg route. This was changed to Lübeck–Mukran–Saint Petersburg on 13 February 2009 then Lübeck–Mukran–Helsinki–Saint Petersburg–Kotka–Lübeck on 30 May. The ship was placed on the Lübeck–Rostock–Kotka–Helsinki route on 30 December 2009 then Lübeck–Ventspils–Saint Petersburg from January 2010 to 6 October 2012. Transeuropa sailed on the Helsinki–Rostock route from 13 November until October 2013.

In November 2013, Transeuropa was sold to Atlantica Navigazione, Naples, Italy. The ship sailed from Travemünde for Malta on 2 November, arriving on 20 November. It was rebuilt at Valletta to provide accommodation for 576 passengers; the ship's dimensions remained the same, except that the depth was increased to 15.23 metres (50 ft 0 in), and tonnage to 33,588 GT. Renamed Euroferry Olympia, it entered service on the Ravenna–Igoumenitsa–Patras route in January 2014.

== 2022 fire ==
On 18 February 2022, at around 4:30 a.m. local time (UTC+2), a fire broke out on the ship in international waters near Diapontia Islands, northwest of Corfu while en route from Igoumenitsa in north-west Greece to Brindisi in south-east Italy. The captain instigated an effective evacuation of the ship. According to authorities, there were at least 292 people on board: 239 registered passengers and two refugees who were not officially checked in, as well as 51 crew members. Grimaldi confirmed that there were 153 vehicles on board. The fire broke out in the parking deck, probably in a truck. Euroferry Olympia was brought closer to the north Corfu coast to offer better protection from the wind.

The ship was later towed to Astakos to complete the fire-fighting and by 23 March the bodies of the eleven missing passengers had been recovered.

The Greek union of lorry drivers (SEOFAE) accused Grimaldi of overloading the ship; the company denied this, stating that passenger numbers were at only 42 per cent of capacity, all 159 lorry drivers had cabins, and overbooking of freight vehicles was prevented. Grimaldi said that it complied with international rules forbidding passengers entering the garage decks while the ship is moving, though an Italian truck driver told RAI that he and many other truck drivers had previously camped in the car deck on the Euroferry Olympia.

The Greek and Italian agencies—Hellenic Bureau for Marine Casualties Investigation (HBMCI) and Direzione Generale Investigation Ferroviarie e Maritime (DIGIFEMA)—commenced a joint accident investigation. At the same time the captain and the two 1st mates were briefly detained to allow statements to be taken.

== 2023 scrapping ==
In September 2023 the vessel was sold for demolition to Turkey, arriving from Astakos in tow at Aliağa on 28 September 2023.
