= Hansa-class ferry =

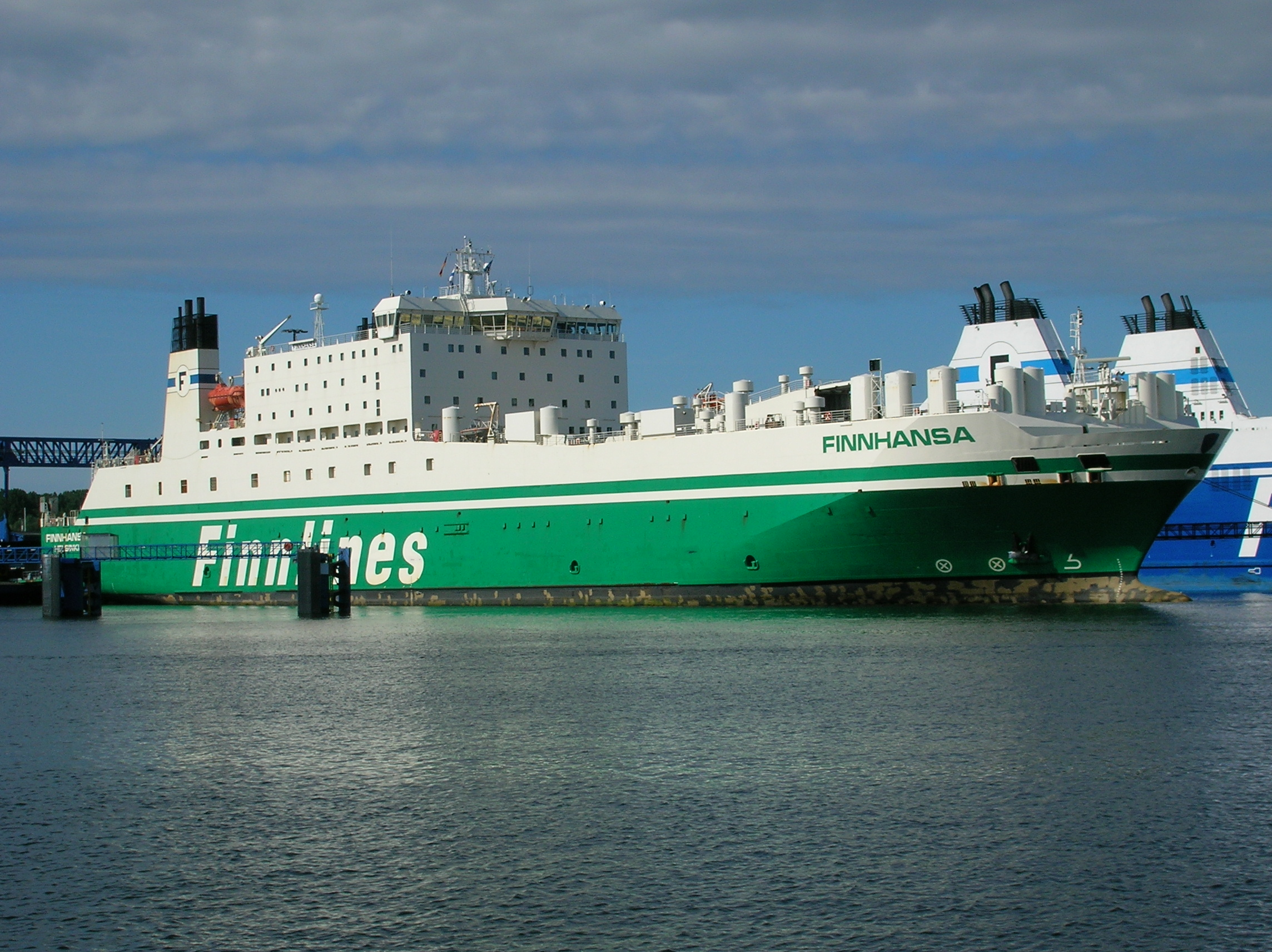
- Finnhansa at Travemünde in 2008

Class overview
- Builders: Stocznia Gdańska, Gdańsk, Poland
- Operators: Finnlines, Grimaldi Ferries
- Succeeded by: Star class
- Completed: 4
- Active: 3
- Retired: 1

General characteristics
- Type: Ro-pax ferry
- Tonnage: 32,534 GT
- Length: 183 m (600 ft 5 in)
- Beam: 29.90 m (98 ft 1 in)
- Depth: 7.40 m (24 ft 3 in)
- Installed power: 4 × Zgoda-Sulzer 8ZAL40S diesels; combined 23,040 kW (30,900 hp)
- Speed: 21.3 knots (39.4 km/h; 24.5 mph)
- Capacity: Passengers; 114 (Euroferry Sicilia & Euroferry Olympia); 274 (Finnpartner & Finntrader); Freight capacity; 3,380 lanemeters (Euroferry Sicilia & Euroferry Olympia); 3,050 lanemeters (Finnpartner & Finntrader)

The Hansa class is a class of four ro-pax ferries originally built by Stocznia Gdańska, Poland for Finncarriers-Poseidon service. Following a merger of Finncarriers and Poseidon to Finnlines, all ships of this class came to be owned by Finnlines. As of 2013, three ships (Finnpartner and Finntrader) are operated on Finnlines' routes connecting Finland and Sweden to Germany, while two ships (Euroferry Sicilia, Euroferry Olympia) sail with Grimaldi Ferries in the Mediterranean.

== History ==
The Hansa-class ships were built mainly as freight-carrying vessels, but they also provided a daily passenger-transporting service between Finland and Germany, in direct competition with Finnjet, a former Finnlines ferry then owned by Silja Line. Originally all Hansa-class ships were used in traffic from Helsinki to Lübeck.

The first ship of the class, Finnhansa, was delivered on 3 August 1994, with Finnpartner following on 12 February 1995, Transeuropa on 31 May 1995 and Finntrader on 26 October 1995. The three Finn-prefixed ships were owned by Finncarriers and registered in Helsinki while Transeuropa was owned by Poseidon and registered in Lübeck. Following a series of mergers between companies owned by Finnlines and brand simplification, in 2000 the ownership of all the ships passed to Finnlines. In 2001 the German terminus of the route was changed to Travemünde.

Following the delivery of new Star-class ships for the Helsinki–Travemünde service in 2006 and 2007 MS Finntrader and MS Finnpartner were taken off the Finland–Germany service and rebuilt at Remontowa, Poland with bow gates and additional cabin spaces. After the refit, on 19 February 2007, Finntrader began service on Finnlines' Malmö–Travemünde route. At the same time the ship's homeport was changed from Helsinki to Malmö and her original cream/green colour scheme was changed to Finnlines' while/blue. Finnpartner was rebuilt with similar modifications and joined Finntrader on the Malmö–Travemünde service in July 2007.

In April 2009 Finnhansa was sold to Grimaldi Ferries (who have the same parent company as Finnlines), and entered service on their Genoa–Catania–Malta service under the name Euroferry Sicilia. Despite this change of ownership the ship at least initially retained its cream/green Finnlines livery with Finnlines company markings.
