= MS Golden Princess =

Casino cruise ship built in 1967

- Finlandia in original appearance and livery

History
- Name: 1967–1978: Finlandia; 1978–1981: Finnstar; 1981–1982: Innstar; 1982–1988: Pearl of Scandinavia; 1988–1994: Ocean Pearl; 1994–1995: Pearl; 1995–1998: Costa Playa; 1998–1999: Oriental Pearl; 1999–2000: Joy Wave; 2000–2009: Golden Princess
- Owner: 1967–1975: Finland Steamship Company; 1975–1980: Enso-Gutzeit; 1981–1990: Loke Shipping; 1990–1992: Sendumar; 1992–1995: Sodimarit; 1995–1998: Costa Cruises; 1998–1999: Mega Wave International; 1999–2000: Costa Cruises; 2000-2009: Eurasia International
- Operator: 1967–1975: Finland Steamship Company; 1975–1977: Finnlines; 1977: TT-Saga Line; 1977–1981: Finnlines; 1979–1980 (spring and autumn seasons): Hapag-Lloyd Cruises; 1982–1994: Pearl Cruises; 1994–1995: Croisières Paquet; 1995–1998: Costa Cruises; 1998–1999: Mega Wave International; 1999–2000: Costa Cruises; 2000-2009: Eurasia International
- Port of registry: 1967–1981: Helsinki Finland; 1981–1994: Nassau, Bahamas; 1994–1995: Toulon, France; 1995-2009: Nassau, Bahamas
- Ordered: 8 April 1965
- Builder: Wärtsilä Hietalahti shipyard, Helsinki, Finland
- Yard number: 383
- Launched: 25 August 1966
- Christened: 25 August 1966 by Louise Ehrnrooth
- Completed: 10 May 1967
- Acquired: 10 May 1967
- In service: 25 May 1967
- Out of service: 2009
- Identification: IMO number: 6622458
- Fate: Scrapped in 2009

General characteristics (as built)
- Type: Ro-ro car and passenger ferry
- Tonnage: 8,583 GRT; 1,715 DWT
- Length: 153.00 m (502 ft)
- Beam: 20.00 m (65 ft 7 in)
- Draught: 5.60 m (18 ft 4 in)
- Decks: 9
- Ice class: 1 A
- Installed power: 4 × Wärtsilä-Sulzer 9ZH40/48; 12,060 kW (combined)
- Propulsion: Two propellers; Two bow thrusters
- Speed: 22 knots (41 km/h; 25 mph)
- Capacity: 1,000 passengers; 254 first class berths; 393 tourist class berths; 321 cars

General characteristics (1979)
- Type: Cruiseferry
- Tonnage: 10,311 GRT
- Draught: 5.80 m (19 ft)
- Capacity: 576 passengers; 576 berths
- Notes: Otherwise same as built

General characteristics (1982)
- Type: Cruise ship
- Tonnage: 12,456 GRT; 1,830 DWT
- Capacity: 515 passengers; 515 berths
- Crew: 173
- Notes: Otherwise same as rebuilt, 1979

General characteristics (1988)
- Tonnage: 12,704 GT (1994)
- Length: 156.67 m (514 ft)
- Notes: Otherwise same as rebuilt, 1982

MS Golden Princess was a casino cruise ship owned by Eurasia International, operated on short casino cruises out of Hong Kong. She was built in 1967 by the Wärtsilä Hietalahti shipyard in Helsinki, Finland as Finlandia for the Finland Steamship Company. In 1975 she was sold to Finnlines, who converted her into the cruise ship Finnstar in 1978. In 1982 she entered service for Pearl Cruises as Pearl of Scandinavia. In 1988 she was renamed Ocean Pearl. In 1994 she entered service with Croisières Paquet as Pearl. Between 1995 and 1998 she sailed for Costa Cruises as Costa Playa. In 1998-1999 she sailed as Oriental Pearl for Mega Wave International, and in 1999-2000 as Joy Wave for Costa Cruises. In 2000 she was sold to Eurasia International and entered service under the name Golden Princess . In 2009 she was sold for scrap to China.

== Concept and construction ==
During the early 1960s Finland Steamship Company's service between Finland, Denmark and West Germany was operated by ageing steamers with no car decks, the newest of which had been built in 1927. Finnlines had started competing with Finland SS Co on the service to West Germany in 1962 with the car/passenger ferry Hansa Express. Two notably larger ferries—Finnhansa and Finnpartner—were under construction, due to enter service on the service with Finnlines in 1966. In order to compete with Finnlines' state-of-the-art ferries, Finland SS Co placed an order for an even larger car/passenger ferry with Wärtsilä Hietalahti shipyard in Helsinki, Finland on 8 April 1965. The new ship could accommodate 1000 passengers, with berths for 647 of them. In keeping with the liner tradition the berths were divided between first and tourist class. The same shipyard was in fact building the new Finnlines vessels at the time Finland SS Co placed their order.

The concept of the new Finland SS Co vessel, eventually to be named Finlandia, was essentially the same as that of Ilmatar, built by the Wärtsilä shipyard for Finland SS Co in 1964. A notable exception was that the new Finlandia would be built with a full-length car-deck that could be accessed from gates both in the stern and bow, whereas the Ilmatar had a smaller, side-loadable car deck. The Finlandia's large size meant she could replace all three steamers operated by Finland SS Co on the service to West Germany.

The Finlandia was launched on 25 August 1966 and named on the same date by Mrs. Louise Ehrnrooth, wife of Finnish banker Göran Ehrnrooth. She was completed on 10 May 1967, and delivered to Finland Steamship Company on the same date on a cruise outside the Harmaja lighthouse in Helsinki. Finnish president Urho Kekkonen and his wife were invited guests on board the delivery cruise, which was made in heavy fog.

=== Rebuildings ===
The ship that started her career as the Finlandia has been rebuilt many times. The first notable refitting took place in February–March 1974, when the Finlandia was fitted with retractable fin stabilisers.

Between 5 September 1978 and 3 January 1979 the Finlandia was heavily rebuilt at the Wärtsilä Turku shipyard. To facilitate dual use as a ferry on the Baltic during the summer high season and cruising during the remainder of the year, her interiors and accommodations were upgraded to cruise ship standards, with new cabins were installed on the upper level of the car deck, while the lower level of the car deck was retained so that she could continue transporting passenger cars. At the same time the bow gate was sealed, so that cars could only be loaded and unloaded from the stern. Following the reconstruction she could accommodate 576 all-berth passengers. Externally the midship dummy funnel was removed and the exhaust pipes in the rear redesigned. Coinciding with the reconstruction she was renamed Finnstar.

Following sale to Loke Shipping, the ship was radically rebuilt into a full-time cruise ship at Aalborg Vaerft in Ålborg, Denmark between August 1981 and April 1982. The lower car deck was built in with cabins, and new penthouse suites were added on the top deck. The existing cabins were enlarged, so that the ship could accommodate just 515 passengers. With the elimination of the car deck the stern doors were sealed, a bulbous bow replaced the original icebreaker bow, and sponsons were fitted aft to increase stability. Following this reconstruction the ship was renamed Pearl of Scandinavia.

Between 5 January and 14 February 1988 the ship was again rebuilt, this time at the Sembawang Shipyard in Singapore. During the refit a new sharply raked bow was fitted, increasing the ship's length by 3.67 metres (12 ft 0 in) and the exhaust pipes replaced by a new aluminium funnel. After this rebuilding the ship was renamed Ocean Pearl by HRH Princess Galyani Vadhana of Thailand.

== Service history ==
=== 1967–1975: Finland Steamship Company ===
The new Finlandia entered service on Finland Steamship Company's service connecting Helsinki, Finland to Travemünde, West Germany via Copenhagen, Denmark on 25 May 1967. She was the largest car/passenger ferry in the world at the time and the fastest ferry on the Baltic Sea, capable crossing the Baltic in just 44 hours. Her facilities were notably superior to the old Finland SS Co ships she had replaced, and she gained immediate popularity. On 23 January 1968 the Finlandia collided with the West German freighter Brook in the Kustaanmiekka strait outside Helsinki. Finlandia survived the encounter without notable damage. On 27 June of the same year the Finlandia evacuated two Danish citizens from a burning motor boat outside Stevns, Denmark. In December 1968 she also became the first ship to be docked at Valmet's new 12,000 ton drydock at Katajanokka, Helsinki.

Faced with competition in the form of the Finlandia, it became clear Finnlines could not operate both their Finnhansa and Finnpartner in the service to West Germany. As a result, the Finnpartner was sold to Rederi AB Svea in 1969. Following the sale Finnlines and Finland SS Co entered a joint service agreement in February 1969. Although the joint service was marketed as Itämeren-laivat (English: Baltic Sea Ships), both ships used on the service maintained the separate liveries of their respectable operators. Plans were also made for a joint subsidiary of Finland SS Co and Finnlines to operate the service to West Germany, but these were never realised.

The Finlandia enjoyed an eventful career with Finland Steamship Company until 1975. On 24 March 1970 a passenger fell ill on board and had to be carried to a hospital in Visby, Gotland by a helicopter. On 31 May 1970 she suffered an engine room fire while in the Bay of Finland. The fire was put out by the crew, but the ship was delayed by three hours. In February 1971 she had to ber docked at the Eriksbergs varv in Gothenburg, Sweden due to a metal worker's strike in Finland. On 3 April 1972 the a tanker truck capsized on the car deck during a heavy storm outside the Hiiumaa lighthouse, crushing four cars.

In 1975, faced with an economical downturn and increased fuel prices, Finland Steamship Company and Finnlines decided to reorganise their operations and extend their joint operations to cargo shipping. The primary result of this was the formation of Finncarriers as a joint cargo-carrying subsidiary. However, as a part of the agreement Finnlines took over the entire Finland-West Germany traffic and with it the Finlandia. An important factor in Finland SS Co withdrawing from the passenger service to West Germany was also GTS Finnjet, a new ship due to enter service for Finnlines in 1977 that would have a high enough capacity to replace all existing passenger-carrying ships on the Finland—West Germany service.

=== 1975–1981: Finnlines ===
Enso-Gutzeit, the owner of Finnlines, took over the Finlandia from Finland Steamship Company on 16 June 1975, ceding Finncarrier to Finland SS Co in exchange. Apart from being painted in Finnlines' livery, the Finlandia continued without changes—she retained her old name, her old homeport and her old route, with a call at Copenhagen in addition to Helsinki and Travemünde (Finnlines' Finnhansa in comparison called at Nynäshamn, Sweden instead of Copenhagen).

While in the port of Travemünde on 1 July 1975 a fire broke out in the Finlandia's galley. Before the fire could be controlled, it spread to the radio cabin and officer's mess. The galley, radio cabin and mess were all destroyed by the fire, and the ship had to be repaired at Kiel, Germany, before she could proceed with normal service. On 13 September 1975 the Finlandia rescued seven people from the sinking German yacht Jan II south of Gedser, Denmark. Two weeks later the Finlandia rescued two East German refugees sailing in an inflatable boat, again south of Gedser.

The new Finnjet was delivered to Enso-Gutzeit in May 1977, replacing the Finlandia in the Finland-Germany service. As a result, the Finlandia was chartered to TT-Saga Line between May and August 1977 for service on the Helsingborg—Malmö—Travemünde route. In November 1977 the Finlandia returned to service with Finnlines as a freighter on the Helsinki—Copenhagen—Lübeck service for duration of eight weeks. After this she remained laid up until the summer season of 1978, when she returned to service on the Finland—Germany run.

Finnlines projected that they would need to retain the Finlandia as a second ship on the Finland—Germany run during the high season, but needed an alternate use for her during the rest of the year. The company had operated Finnpartner and Bore Star as cruise ships with limited success during the winters between 1973 and 1977. Now the decision was made to convert the Finlandia's interiors into cruise ship standards, while partially retaining her car deck. Following rebuilding at Wärtsilä's Turku shipyard the ship was renamed Finnstar and re-entered service on 8 January 1979 with a cruise on the west coast of Africa. During the winter season she made cruises on the African coast for Finnlines, during the spring and autumn she cruised on the Mediterranean and Norwegian fjords under charter to Hapag-Lloyd Cruises, and during the summer she was used by Finnlines as a ferry on the Helsinki—Slite—Copenhagen run, as well as on cruises from Helsinki to Leningrad, Slite and Tallinn. On 19 November 1979 she became the first Finnish-flagged cruise ship to cross the Equator.

Like Finnlines' previous attempts to enter the cruise business, the Finnstar proved to be largely unsuccessful. She was relatively small vessel, unable to cater to the expectations of the international market. Her operational costs were also notably higher than those of her main competitors. Her West African cruises were too high-class to be sold at a reasonable price on the small Finnish cruise market. An additional factor was the competition from Finnstar's former fleetmate Ilmatar that was used on similar cruises aimed at the Finnish market by Silja Line. The Finnstar's prospect were further worsened in 1980, when crewing costs increased following the Finnish Maritime Strike of 1980. As a result of the increasing losses generated by the ship, Finnlines decided to give up their cruise traffic in 1980. The Finnstar's last cruise terminated in Barcelona on 12 September 1980. Subsequently, she sailed to Toulon, France, where she was laid up on 14 September 1980 and placed for sale.

=== 1981–1994: Pearl Cruises ===
The Finnstar remained laid up at Toulon until 27 May 1981, when she was sold to Loke Shipping, a joint venture between the Norway-based I.M. Skaugen and J. Lauritzen A/S shipping companies, who planned to use the ship for cruising out of Hong Kong and Singapore. Temporarily renamed Innstar, the ship sailed for Toulon to Ålborg where she was rebuilt into a cruise ship by Aalborg Vaerft. The ship was delivered following the reconstruction in April 1982, renamed Pearl of Scandinavia and reregistered in the Bahamas. She sailed to Hong Kong, embarking on 14-, 28- and 42-day cruises in East and Southeast Asia for Pearl Cruises of Scandinavia in June 1982.

On 1 September 1983 I.M. Skaugen withdrew from the Pearl Cruises of Scandinavia venture, leaving J. Lauritzen as the sole owner of the Pearl of Scandinavia. This change of ownership had no effect on her service. In April 1987 Pearl Cruises of Scandinavia were sold to 2000 Corporation. Despite the fact the 2000 Corporation already owned another cruise line, Ocean Cruise Lines, the Pearl Cruises of Scandinavia brand was retained for the Pearl of Scandinavia, although the company name was simplified to simply Pearl Cruises.

Between January and February 1988 the Pearl of Scandinavia was again rebuilt, this time at the Sembawang Shipyard in Singapore. On 14 February she was renamed Ocean Pearl by HRH Princess Galyani Vadhana of Thailand and subsequently re-entered service. Throughout these changes Loki Shipping remained the ship's owners. In April 1990 Ocean Cruise Lines were acquired by the France-based Croisières Paquet. Two months later Loki Shipping sold the Ocean Pearl to Sendumar. Despite these changes the ship continued in Asian cruise service for Pearl Cruises. In 1992 Croisières Paquet also acquired the Ocean Pearl.

=== 1994–1995: Croisières Paquet ===
In February 1994 the Ocean Pearl's marketing was taken over by Croisières Paquet. She was renamed Pearl and reregistered in France, but continued cruising in the Asian market until 14 September 1995.

=== 1995–1998: Costa Cruises ===
Costa Playa at sea.

The Italy-based Costa Cruises had absorbed Croisières Paquet in 1994. As a result of this the Pearl was withdrawn from Croisières Paquet service on 14 September 1995. She then sailed to the T. Mariotti shipyard in Genoa, Italy. Following the refit the entered service with Costa Cruises as Costa Playa on 12 November 1995. At the same time she returned under the Bahamian flag. The Costa Playa was used for cruises in the Caribbean with Puerto Plata, Dominican Republic, as the port of departure. She was the first cruise ship to visit Cuba since the end of the Cold War, calling at Santiago de Cuba, Havana and Baia Nipe during her cruises.

=== 1998–2000: Mega Wave International and Costa Cruises ===
The Costa Playa was withdrawn from service with Costa Cruises in January 1998. She was sold to the Hong Kong–based Mega Wave International and renamed Oriental Pearl. Whether she was ever used in active service by Mega Wave is unknown. In August 1999 her ownership again passed to Costa Cruises and she was renamed Joy Wave. Again it is unknown is she was actually used in active service as the Joy Wave.

=== 2000–2009: Eurasia International ===
In November 2000 the Joy Wave was sold to Eurasia International, another Hong Kong–based company, who refitted her as the casino cruise ship Golden Princess. The Golden Princess entered service on casino cruises out of Hong Kong in November 2000. In July 2009, her owners sold her to China for scrapping.

== Design ==
=== Exterior design ===
Externally the Finlandia was designed with a classical hull-shape, with a notable sheer on the hull, a long bow, and a terraced rear superstructure. In keeping with traditional liner aesthetic, the ship was given a large midship dummy funnel. In reality the exhausts from the engines were emitted from two smaller exhaust pipes attached to the rear mast of the ship. In Finland Steamship Company service the ship was painted with a white hull and superstructure, with two narrow black stripes painted along the length of the hull on the level of the top of the car deck. In the bow the stripes were interrupted by the ship's name, painted on dark yellow. The dummy funnel was painted in the Finland SS Co colours, black with two white horizontal stripes.

When the Finlandia passed under Finnlines ownership, she was painted in the then-current Finnlines colours, with the two black decorative stripes on the hull replaced by a wider blue stripe. The hull was painted grey below the blue stripe and white above. The black Effoa funnel colours were replaced by Finnlines' passenger services funnel colours, white with a white/blue stripe and a large white emblem with a black "F" in the center.

When the Finlandia was converted into the Finnstar, the dummy funnel was removed and the exhaust pipes heightened and remodelled, with a small smoke deflector structure added behind them. A new colour scheme was adopted, with a white hull and superstructure. The ship's name was painted on the hull with grey letters, in a style that appeared handwritten. Wide blue stripes were painted running along the windows of the bridge deck and the lowest superstructure deck. The exhaust pipes were repainted blue and the deflector structure white with a small "F" on it. The Finnstar was the first ship to utilise a livery with blue stripes painted along the windows; two years later it was adopted by Silja Line and subsequently became strongly associated with them.

As the Pearl of Scandinavia a box-like penthouse suite structure was added on the top deck, between the bridge and the exhaust pipes, while sponsons were added to the rear hull. As a new livery the ship was painted all-white, with blue exhaust pipe/deflector structure. Pearl Cruises' "waves and crown" logo was painted on the hull. During a part of her service as Pearl of Scandinavia the ship had an additional blue horizontal decorative stripe painted in the middle of the hull.

When Pearl of Scandinavia became Ocean Pearl, her bow was replaced with a more sharply raked one, and the exhaust pipe structure with a sweeping funnel. As a new livery she was painted all-white, with the Pearl Cruises logo on blue in the white funnel. As Pearl she retained the same external shape, but with the blue/red Croisières Paquet logo replacing the Pearl Cruises logo on the funnel, and a narrow blue/red decorative stripe on the hull following the same line as the original black decorative stripes. As Costa Playa she was repainted in the Costa Cruises livery with an all-white hull and superstructure topped with a yellow funnel with a blue "C" on it. The liveries the ship carried as Oriental Pearl and Joy Wave are unknown.

As Golden Princess the sweeping windbreakers shielding the rear decks, tying to the curve of the funnel were removed. The ship was again painted all-white, with the top half of the funnel yellow and the bottom half blue, and a blue circle with the ship's name on it in the center of the funnel.

=== Interior design ===
The Finlandia's original interiors were designed by famous artists and architects such as Jonas Cedercreutz, Lisa Johansson-Pape, Dora Jung, Harry Kivijärvi and Rut Bryk. The interior facilities included a swimming pool, sauna, nightclub, smoking room, cinema and hair salon, most of which were novelties for Finland Steamship Company ship on the Finland—West Germany run. The 647 passengers berths were divided between 254 first class berths and 393 tourist class berths. On conversion into the Finnstar the public spaces were rebuilt, the existing cabins replaced with more luxurious ones and new luxury cabins added on the upper level of the car deck. As a result, the Finnstar carried 576 all-berth passengers. As the Pearl of Scandinavia the cabins were again upgraded, the remaining car deck eliminated and new penthouse suites added; as a result the ship had berths for 515 passengers.

=== Decks and facilities ===
==== As Finlandia, 1967 ====
Facilities included a Cinema/auditorium, a sauna and a swimming pool,
