= SS Ernst Brockelmann =

Cargo ship

History
- Name: Ernst Brockelmann (1927-45); Empire Concession (1945-47); Brazen Head (1947-50); Enso (1950-59); Hakuni (1959-66); Isla Del Rey (1966)
- Owner: Ehrich Ahrens (1927-45); Ministry or War Transport (1945); Ministry of Transport (1945-47); Blandy, Bros & Co (1947-50); Enso Gutzeit Oy (1950-59); Raumanmeri Oy (1959-66); Mendez Moreno (1966)
- Operator: Ehrich Ahrens (1927-45); Burnett Steamship Co Ltd (1945-47); Blandy, Bros & Co (1947-50); Oy Baltic Chartering Ab (1950-54); Oy Finnlines Ab (1954-59); E Fagerström Oy (1959-61); Raumanmeri Oy (1961-66); Mendez Moreno (1966)
- Port of registry: (Weimar Republic) Rostock (1927-33); (Nazi Germany) Rostock (1933-45); (United Kingdom) London (1945-50); (Finland) Kotka (1950-59); (Finland) Rauma (1950-5); Panama City (1965-66)
- Builder: Neptun AG
- Launched: 1927
- Identification: Code Letters MFPT (1927-34); Code Letters DMBY (1934-45); Code Letters GFLT (1945-50); Code Letters OFPZ (1951-65); United Kingdom Official Number 180658 (1945-50); Finnish Official Number 538 (1951-59); Finnish Official Number 596 (1960-66)
- Fate: Scrapped

General characteristics
- Tonnage: 1,900 GRT (1927-55); 1,803 GRT (1955-66); 1,120 NRT (1927-50); 966 NRT (1950-66)
- Length: 266 ft 7 in (81.25 m) (1927-56); 280 ft 10 in (85.60 m) (1956-66)
- Beam: 42 ft 2 in (12.85 m)
- Draught: 19 ft 0 in (5.79 m)
- Depth: 16 ft 9 in (5.11 m)
- Ice class: IC (1962-65)
- Installed power: Triple expansion steam engine
- Propulsion: Screw propeller
- Speed: 9.5 knots (17.6 km/h)

Ernst Brockelmann was a 1,900 GRT cargo ship that was built in 1927 by Neptun AG, Rostock, Germany for Ehrich Ahrens. In 1945, she was seized by the Allies and passed to the Ministry of War Transport (MoWT), renamed Empire Concession. In 1946, she was sold into merchant service and renamed Brazen Head. In 1950, she was sold to Finland and renamed Enso. A further sale in 1959 saw her renamed Hakuni. In 1966, she was sold to Panama and renamed Isla Del Rey. She was scrapped in June 1966.

== Description ==
The ship was built in 1927 by Neptun AG, Rostock.

The ship was 266 feet 7 inches (81.25 m) long, with a beam of 42 feet 2 inches (12.85 m) a depth of 16 feet 9 inches (5.11 m), and a draught of 19 feet 0 inches (5.79 m). She had a GRT of 1,900 and a NRT of 1,120, which had reduced to 966 by 1950.

The ship was propelled by a triple expansion steam engine, which had cylinders of 19 5/16 inches (49.1 cm), 31 1/4 inches (79 cm) and 51 3/16 inches (130.0 cm) diameter by 35 7/16 inches (90.0 cm) stroke. The engine was built by Neptun AG. The engine could propel her at 9.5 knots (17.6 km/h).

== History ==
Ernst Brockelmann was built for Ehrich Ahrens, Rostock. Her port of registry was Rostock and the Code Letters MFPT were allocated. In 1934, her Code Letters were changed to DMBY. In May 1945, Ernst Brockelmann was seized by the Allies at Flensburg. She was passed to the MoWT and renamed Empire Concession. She was placed under the management of the Burnett Steamship Co Ltd. Her port of registry was changed to London. The Code Letters GFLT and United Kingdom Official Number 180658 were allocated.

In 1945, Empire Concession was sold to Blandy, Bros & Co, London and renamed Brazen Head. In 1950. Brazen Head was sold to Enso Gutzeit Oy, Helsinki, Finland and was renamed Enso. She was placed under the management of Oy Baltic Chartering AB, Helsinki. Her port of registry was changed to Kotka. Enso was allocated the code letters OYPZ and the Finnish Official Number 538. She was operated under the management of Oy Baltic Chartering Ab, Helsinki. In 1954, management was transferred to Oy Finnlines Ab, Helsinki.

In 1955-56, Enso was refitted. This reduced her GRT to 1,803 while lengthening her to 280 feet 10 inches (85.60 m) overall. She was sold to Raumanmeri Oy, Rauma in 1959. The ship was renamed Hakuni and placed under the management of A Fagerström, Rauma. Her port of registry was changed to Rauma and the Finnish Official Number 596 was allocated. In 1962, Raumanmeri Oy took over operation of the ship themselves. At that time, the ship was assessed as ice class IC. In 1966, Hakuni was sold to Mendez Moreno, Panama and was renamed Isla Del Rey. She was scrapped at Alicante, Spain in June 1966.
