= Star-class ferry =

Class of ferries

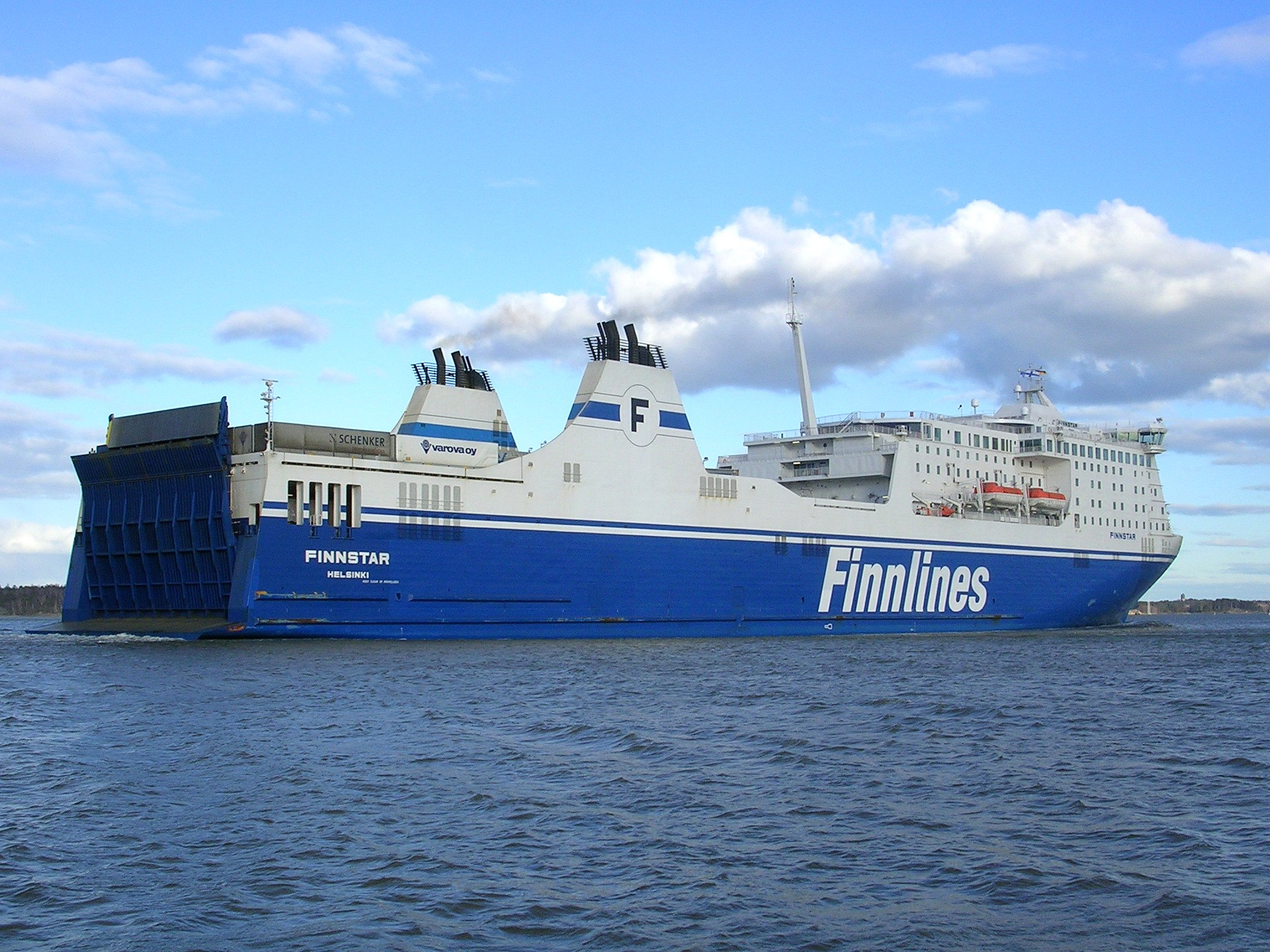
- MS Finnstar

Class overview
- Builders: Fincantieri, Italy
- Operators: Finnlines
- In service: 2006–present
- Completed: 5

General characteristics
- Type: Ferry
- Tonnage: 42,923 GT
- Length: 218.8 m (717 ft 10 in)
- Beam: 30.2 m (99 ft 1 in)
- Depth: 7 m (23 ft 0 in)
- Propulsion: 4 × Wärtsilä 9L46D diesel engines; 48,000 kW (64,000 hp) (combined)
- Speed: 25 knots (46 km/h; 29 mph)
- Capacity: 500 passengers; 4,200 lane meters

The Star class is a class of five Ro-pax ferries built by Fincantieri, Italy at their Castellammare di Stabia and Ancona shipyards for Finnlines. They are used on Finnlines' routes connecting Finland to Germany and Sweden to Germany. Most ships of this class were delivered behind original planned schedule.

== MS Finnstar ==
MS Finnstar was the first Star-class ship to be completed. The ship was built at Fincantieri's Castellammare di Stabia yard. She was delivered to Finnlines in July 2006 (original planned delivery date was in late 2005) and the class takes its name from this ship. She is used on the Helsinki–Travemünde route. During construction a small fire broke out on board the ship in November 2005, but it was quickly extinguished. The Finnstar was registered in Helsinki, Finland but as of November 2014 Finnstar was re-registered to Mariehamn.

== MS Finnmaid ==
MS Finnmaid was built at Fincantieri's Ancona shipyard, and is used on the Helsinki–Travemünde route. She was delivered in August 2006. Immediately after the first Travemünde–Helsinki trip the ship was forced to drydock in Bremerhaven due to problems with her bow thrusters. On 4 January 2007, a small fire broke out on board while the ship was docked in Helsinki, that seems to have originated, and been contained to one of the bilge pumps on board. The Finnmaid is registered in Helsinki, Finland.

== MS Finnlady ==
The ship currently sailing under the name MS Finnlady was originally laid down as MS Europalink, but due to delays in construction of the original Finnlady Finnlines decided to swap the names of the ships. She was built at Fincantieri's Ancona shipyard and delivered in February 2007 (original planned delivery date was in October 2006). She is used on the Helsinki–Travemünde route. The Finnlady is registered in Helsinki, Finland.

== MS Europalink ==
MS Europalink was originally planned to be called MS Finnlady, but delays in construction made Finnlines swap the names of the two ships. She was built at the Castellammare di Stabia shipyard, and her original delivery date was planned to be in mid-2006, but eventually she was delivered in March 2007 and used on Finnlines Nordö-Link service between Malmö and Travemünde. In January 2022, Europalink was transferred to Naantali-Långnäs-Kapellskär route and reflagged under Finnish flag. From 2023 to 2024 she briefly returned to the Nordö-Link service between Malmö and Travemünde. The Europalink is registered in Mariehamn, Finland.

The Europalink left on 24 January from Malmö to Naples, to change livrey to Grimaldi Lines. It currently serves the route Igoumenitsa-Brindisi.

== MS Finnswan ==
Formerly named the MS Nordlink, renamed in 2018 to MS Finnswan. The construction of Nordlink was begun at the Castellammare di Stabia shipyard, but she was moved to the Ancona shipyard after launching. The ship's original planned delivery date was in March 2007 but after numerous delays she was finally delivered in July 2007. The Nordlink is registered in Malmö, Sweden. Following delivery the ship was placed on Malmö–Travemünde traffic, replacing the old MS Malmö Link. Since June 2009 she has been sailing between Helsinki and Travemünde via Gdynia. Since June 2015 she has been sailing between Malmö and Travemünde. Since 2018 on route between Naantali and Kapellskär. In 2024 she replaced MS Europalink on the Nordö-Link service between Malmö and Travemünde.
