= CSC Jinling =

Chinese shipbuilding firm

CSC Jinling Shipyard
- Type: state-owned enterprise
- Industry: Shipbuilding
- Founded: 1952
- Headquarters: Nanjing, Jiangsu, China
- Key people: Biao Ge, Director
- Website: Official website

CSC Jinling Shipyard is a Chinese shipbuilding firm founded in 1952, and a subsidiary of the state owned China Merchants Industry, based in Nanjing in Jiangsu Province.

The yard reached preliminary agreement to build the Titanic II, a replica of the original Titanic, the plan of which is now apparently ‘almost done with production’ - although no real evidence of such production actually exists.

Nanjing Jinling Shipyard's Nanjing (330,000 m^{2} (82 acres)) and Yizheng (900,000 m^{2} (220 acres)) yards spread along 3.25 km (2.02 mi) of shoreline and build cargo ships, floating docks, submarines, etc. Exports started in 1996, since when Jinling has exported about 200 vessels to over 20, or 30 countries. Over 900 staff are employed, including over 300 senior and medium-grade engineers. There are dry docks of 100,000 DWT and 200,000 DWT, 8 50,000 DWT slipways, 3 fitting-out piers and 9 heavy lifting cranes with capacities of 500, 300 and 150 tons. Annual production can be up to 1,900,000 DWT.
