= Finnlines =

Finnish shipping company

Finnlines Plc
- Industry: Shipping
- Founded: 1947
- Headquarters: Helsinki, Finland
- Area served: Northern Europe
- Key people: Tom Pippingsköld, President and CEO
- Services: Freight transport Short sea shipping
- Revenue: €736.1 million (2022)
- Operating income: ▲€133.3 million (2022)
- Number of employees: 1,679 (2022)
- Parent: Grimaldi Group
- Website: www.finnlines.com

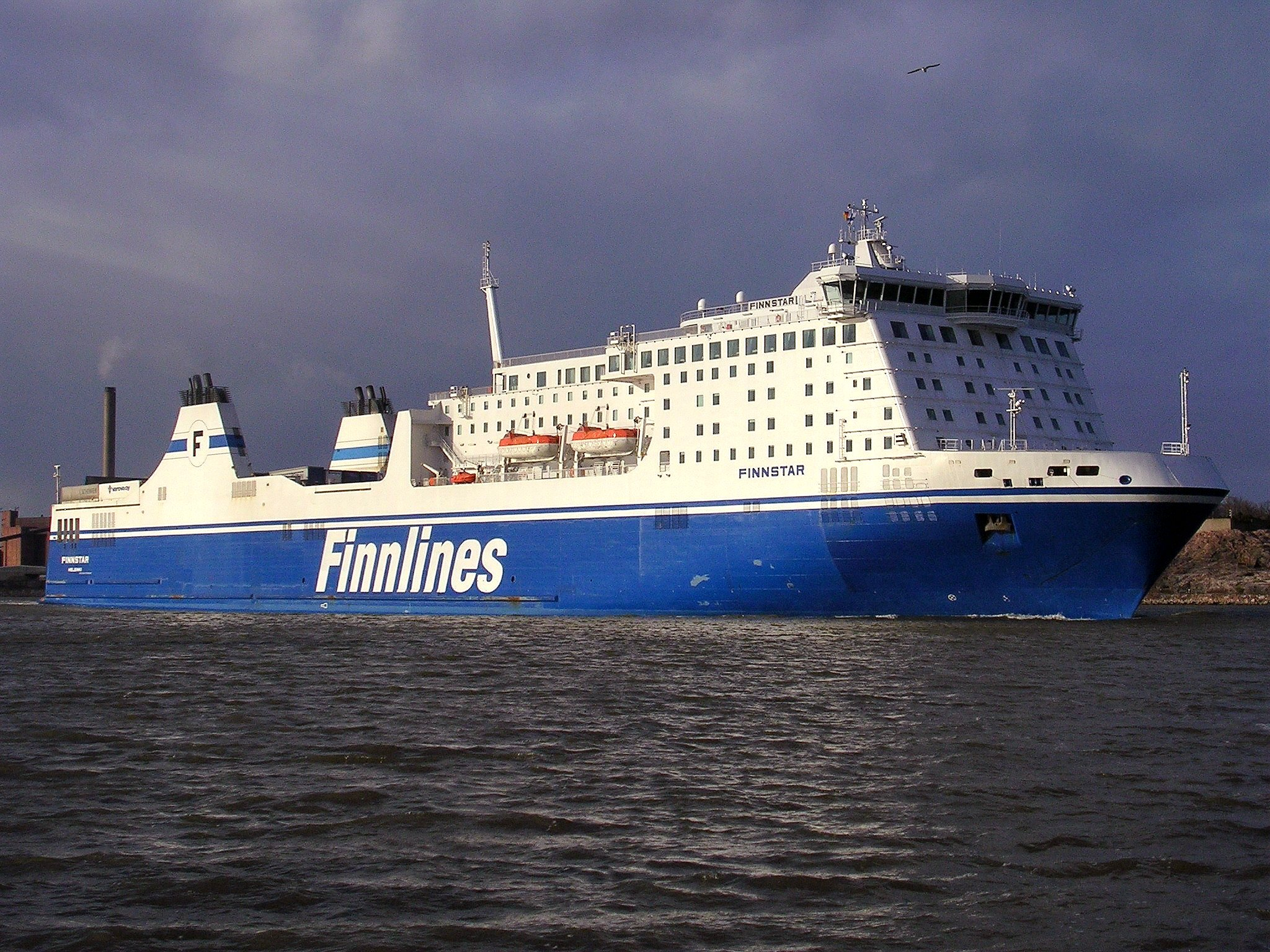
Finnlines' flagship MS Finnstar departing Helsinki, April 2007

Finnlines Plc (Finnish: Finnlines Oyj, Swedish: Finnlines Abp) is a shipping operator of ro-ro and passenger services in the Baltic Sea, the North Sea, and the Celtic Sea. It is a subsidiary of the Grimaldi Group. Finnlines’ sea transports are concentrated in the Baltic and the North Sea. Finnlines’ passenger-freight vessels offer services from Finland to Germany and via Åland to Sweden as well as from Sweden to Germany. The Company has subsidiaries in Germany, Belgium, Great Britain, Sweden, Denmark and Poland. In addition to sea transportation, the Company provides port services in Finland in Helsinki and Turku.

Finnlines’ roll-on/roll-off services cover the Finnish ports of Hanko, Helsinki, Kotka, Turku and Uusikaupunki, offering connections with Swedish, Polish, German, Danish, British, Dutch, Belgian, Irish, and Spanish ports.

Three Star-class ropax vessels (see Roll-on/roll-off § RORO variations) operate between Helsinki and Travemünde. For passengers it is the only direct connection by sea between Finland and Continental Europe.

The other ropax services consist of the route between Malmö, Sweden, and Travemünde, Germany and between Naantali and the Åland Islands, Finland, and Kapellskär, Sweden.

== History ==
=== 1947–1977 ===
Finnlines was founded in 1947 as a subsidiary of Merivienti Oy, founded earlier the same year by Enso-Gutzeit and Kansaneläkelaitos, to operate Merivienti's liner service from Finland to the United States.

Merivienti Oy (English: Sea Export Ltd.) was founded on 18 April 1947 by the Finnish forest industry giant Enso-Gutzeit and Kansaneläkelaitos (Finnish Social Insurance)—both completely or partially state-owned companies—to ensure transportation of forest industry products from Finland to Western Bloc countries. According to the 1947 Paries Peace Treaty with the Soviet Union, Finland had to pay US$300 million worth of war reparations to the Soviet Union, mostly in industrial goods. With only 30% of the Finnish merchant fleet having survived the war, and 2/3 of the surviving ships being used by the Allied forces or under forced charter to the Soviet Union, new tonnage was desperately needed.

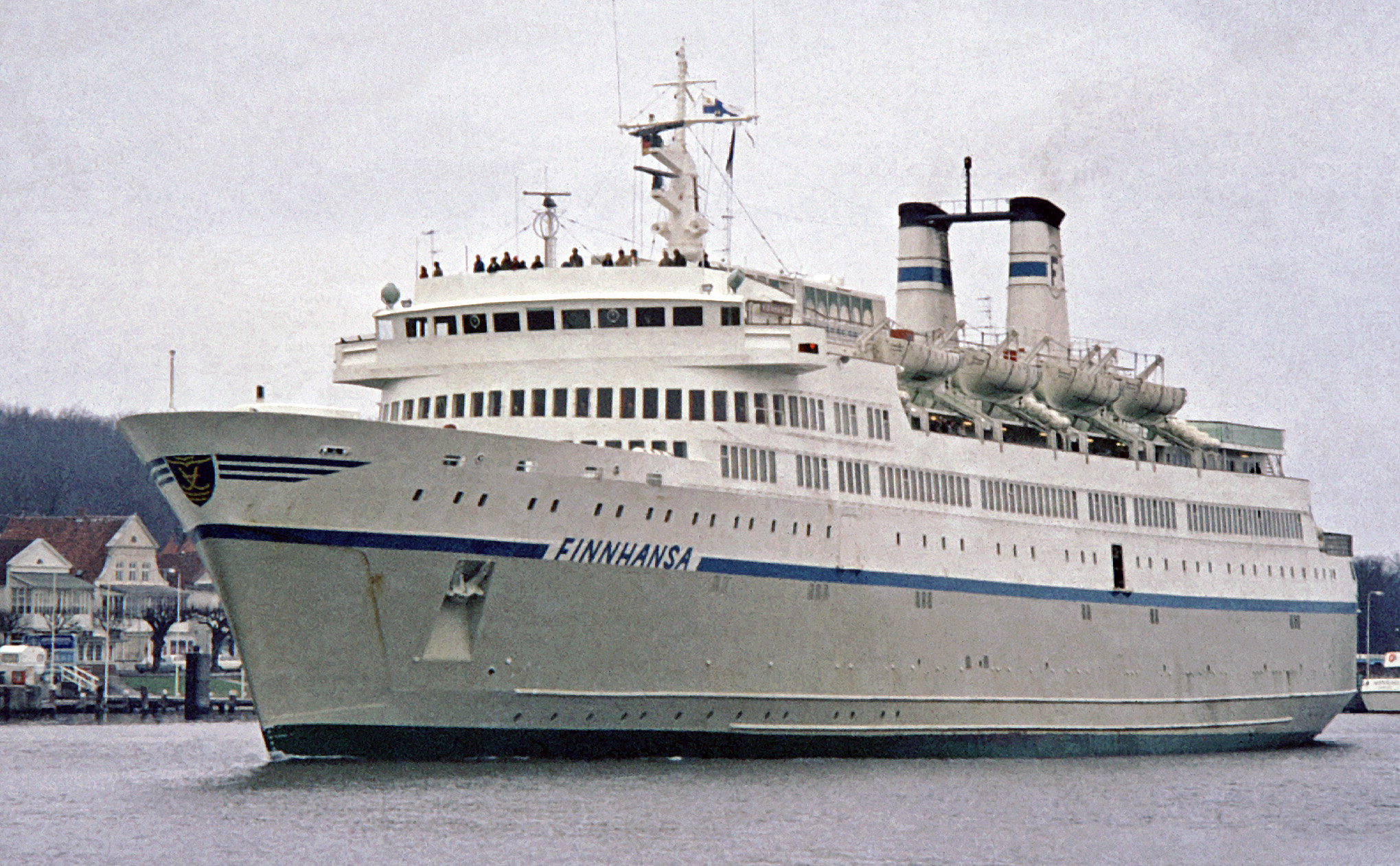
The Finnhansa 1975 in Lübeck-Travemünde

In May and June 1947, Merivienti acquired three second-hand steamers for traffic into Europe. During the same year, Merivienti decided to start liner traffic from Finland to the east coast of the United States. With this in mind, Merivienti acquired three larger second-hand steamships, named SS Hamina, SS Pankakoski and SS Tornator. To operate these ships, a new company Oy Finnlines Ltd, was founded in November 1947. Finnlines was a 100% subsidiary of Merivienti and owned no ships of its own—instead the Merivienti ships were operated by and marketed as Finnlines. In subsequent years, vessels owned by other companies, such as Enso-Gutzeit (for whom they managed SS Enso), Neste, Outokumpu, Yhtyneet Paperitehtaat, Amer-Tupakka and Thomesto. Finnlines' traffic into the United States begun in 1948. The used ships were soon found to be too small and during the 1950s seven new freighters were delivered to various owners to be operated by Finnlines. At this time the company started using names with the "Finn" prefix that has become characteristic of their fleet. A line to the United Kingdom was opened in 1955.

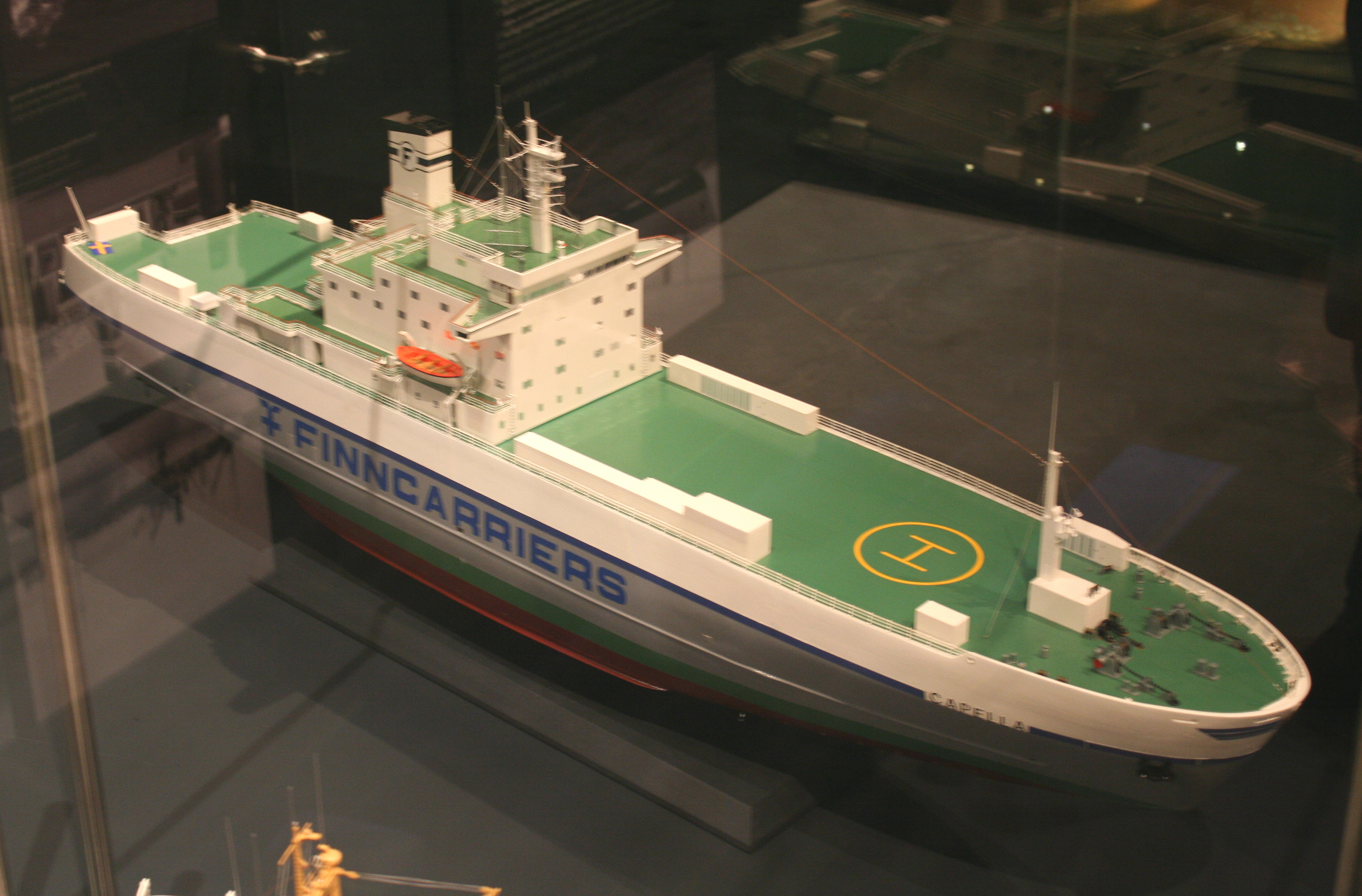
A model of Finncarriers' MS Capella av Stockholm, built 1972 as MS Hans Gutzeit. The model retains the original Finnlines colours, with the Finnlines text on the hull replaced by a Finncarriers text.

The company first begun carrying passengers in 1962, when the car ferry MS Hansa Express opened a new service linking Hanko, Finland to Travemünde, Germany via Visby in Sweden. The ship was found to be too small from the start, and Hanko a poor choice for the Finnish terminus of the line. The route was altered to Helsinki–Kalmar–Travemünde in 1963, and two large new ferries were delivered for the route in 1966. MS Finnhansa was the larger of the two sister ships, surpassing MS Finnpartner by ten centimeters; it was the largest ferry in the Baltic Sea at the time. Having two ferries year-round proved to be unprofitable and the Finnpartner was sold in 1969. In the late 60s Finnlines developed the Finnflow cargo-handling system, which resulted in the building of the company's first roll-on/roll-off freighters MS Finncarrier, MS Hans Gutzeit and MS Finnfellow.

In 1973, Finnlines purchased MS Stena Atlantica from Stena Line and renamed her MS Finnpartner, for service to Germany alongside the Finnhansa. During the winter season the second Finnpartner was sent cruising to the Mediterranean. In the same year Finnlines also placed an order at the Wärtsilä Helsinki shipyard for a new gas turbine-powered ferry for the Finland-Germany service that was to be the largest, longest, and fastest in the world. Before the new ferry was delivered several changes occurred to Finnlines: in 1975 Finnlines and their rival Finland Steamship Company (FÅA, which later became Effoa) began collaborating in freight and passenger traffic. Finncarriers was formed as a joint freight operator, while the Finland Steamship Company's Finland-Germany passenger services were merged into Finnlines' services, bringing MS Finlandia to Finnlines' fleet. This meant the second Finnpartner was chartered to Olau Line. With the Finlandia and Finnhansa, Finnlines maintained a year-round service to Germany, while MS Bore Star was chartered from Bore Line for cruising for the winter seasons of 1975–76 and 76–77 (she was marketed under the name Finnpartner).

=== 1977–1987 ===
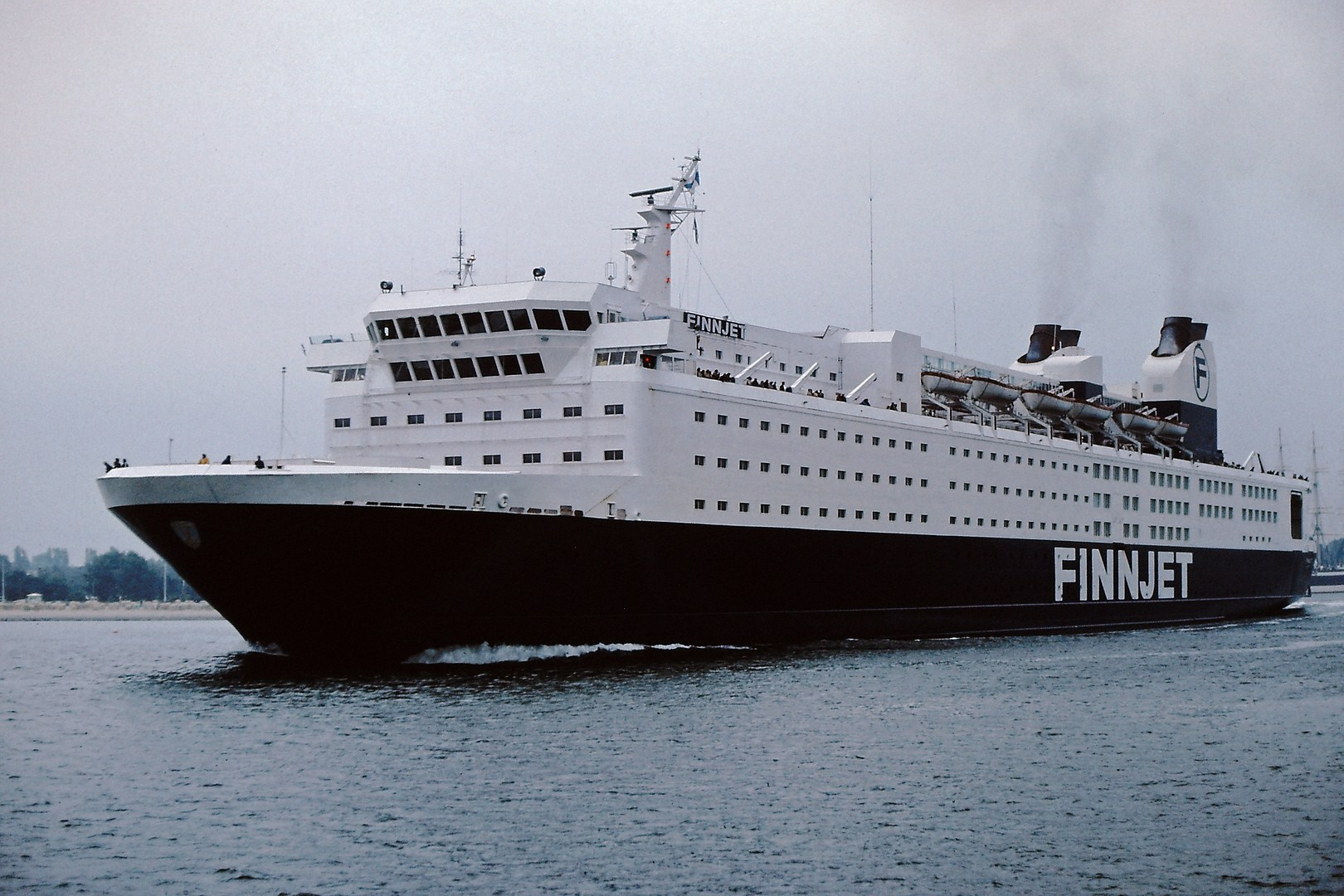
GTS Finnjet in 1982

The new, large, fast GTS Finnjet was delivered to Finnlines in May 1977, replacing both of the old ferries on the route. With her 31-knot top speed the Finnjet was able to cross the Baltic in a mere 22 hours, and her accommodations were superior to those of any ferry of the day. Unfortunately she had also been designed before the oil crisis, meaning her operational costs were much higher than originally planned. After delivery of the Finnjet, the Finlandia was rebuilt into the cruise ship MS Finnstar, becoming Finnlines' first (and to date last) genuine cruise ship. The Finnstar's service was cut short by the Finnish maritime worker's strike of 1980, as result of which she ceased service and was laid up in Barcelona. In May 1981 she was sold to the Loke Shipping Co. In October of the same year, the Finnjet was rebuilt with additional diesel engines, allowing for more economic operations during the off-season.

In 1982, the first of the new jumbo-roll-on/roll-off ships was built for the Finland-United Kingdom run. Four sister ships were built over the next decade. Also in 1982, Enso-Gutzeit decided to give up its shipping activities and as a result 75% of Finnlines was sold to other shipping companies. All Enso-Gutzeit ships sailing for Finncarriers were sold to Effoa or Neste Oy and all of Enso-Gutzeit's shares of Finncarriers were sold to Effoa. Finncarriers thus became a subsidiary of Effoa. Several mergers followed during the 1980s when Effoa merged various other companies it completely or partially owned into Finncarriers. In 1986 Enso-Gutzeit finally bowed out of shipping activities completely when they sold their remaining share of GTS Finnjet (25%) to Effoa, who transferred the ship into the fleet of their other subsidiary Silja Line. In the same year a new company, Finnlink, was founded to operate freight between Finland and Sweden. The company's owners were mainly the same as the owners of Finnlines, and Finnlines itself owned 15% of Finnlink.

=== 1987–2002 ===
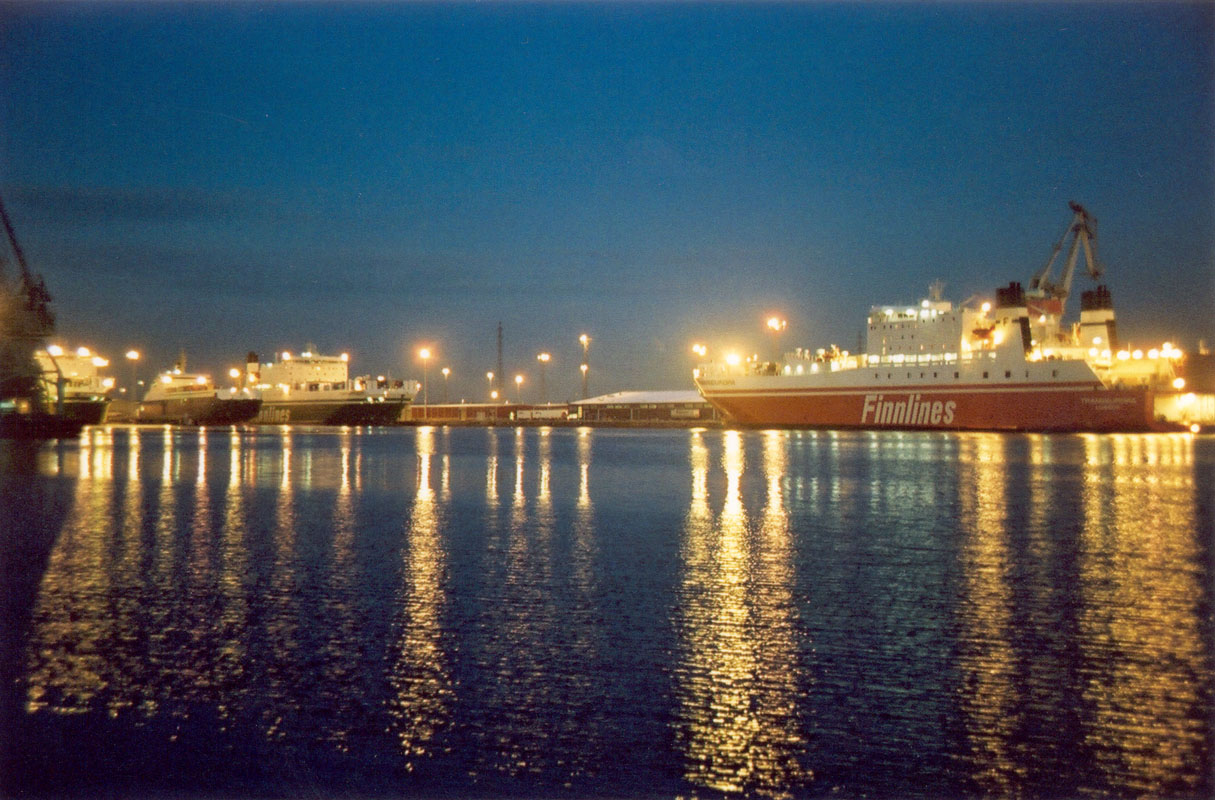
Finnlines ships in Helsinki in late 2004

A full turn-around in Effoa's operations took place in 1989 when the company decided to separate their freight-carrying operations from their passenger operations. In place of dividends, shares of Finncarriers were given to stock owners, and after several mergers, diffusions, and name-changes, a new Finnlines Group was born in 1990. In the following years Finnlines acquired Bore Line, the operations of which were incorporated into Finnlines in 1992. Around the same time Finnlines started collaboration with the German shipping company Poseidon Schiffahrt on Helsinki–Travemünde traffic, which was marketed under the name Finncarriers-Poseidon. During 1994 and 1995 four new combi-roro ships (known as the Hansa class), capable of carrying 114 passengers alongside their freight capacity, were delivered for Finncarriers-Poseidon traffic.

In 1997, Finnlines made a deal with the German Stinnes AG, essentially swapping the shared Finnlines ownership of the German company BLT with the full ownership of Poseidon Schiffahrt. As a result, the company name "Poseidon" disappeared from the sides of Finland-Germany ships and Poseidon became Finnlines Deutschland. With Poseidon, the trainferry operator Railship and 40% of Team Lines also passed into Finnlines' ownership. In the same year Finnlines also became the sole owner of Finnlink. In 1999 Finnlines took delivery of two new ro-pax vessels, MS Finnclipper and MS Finneagle, both with a passenger capacity of over 400. In 2001 Finncarriers was merged into the parent company. In the same year Finnlines purchased the rest of Team Lines, and in 2002 the Swedish Nordö-Link (trafficking between Malmö and Travemünde) also became a Finnlines subsidiary.

=== 2002–present ===
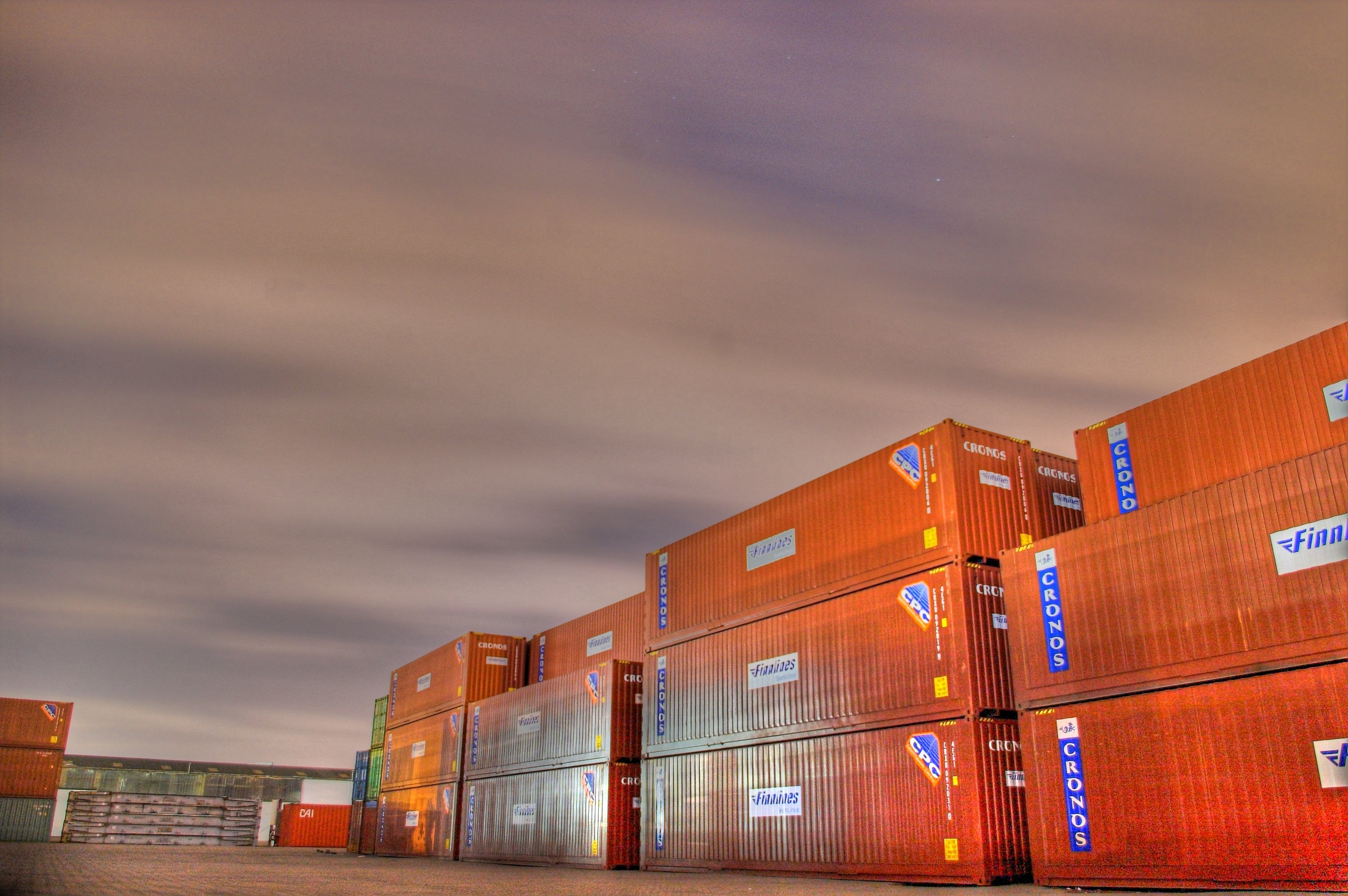
Finnlines/Cronos containers in Germany

In 2004, Finnlines decided to further simplify the myriad of names under which it operated ships, merging Finnlink and Nordö-Link into the parent company. Finnlines also ordered five new large ro-pax ferries from the Italian shipyard Fincantieri. After numerous delays, the first vessel, MS Finnstar was delivered in August 2006 for the Helsinki–Travemünde service, MS Finnmaid followed later in the same year, while MS Finnlady, MS Europalink and MS Nordlink were delivered in February, March and July 2007, respectively. Coinciding with the delivery of MS Nordlink the old MS Malmö Link was sold. In August 2007 it was reported that Finnlines has ordered six new ice classed ro-ro vessels from the Jinling Shipyard in China, with planned delivery dates in 2010 for the first two vessels and 2011 for the remaining four. In January 2007, the Italian Grimaldi Group became the largest owner of Finnlines and expressed interest in purchasing the entire company. However, a public tender offer made to the other owners in November 2006 resulted in Grimaldi gaining only 85,029 stocks, or 0.18% of the total. In October 2015, Grimaldi completed its acquisition of the entirety of Finnlines.

In 2018, Finnlines ordered three new ro-ro ships from the Nanjing Jinling shipyard in China. Construction on the first ship in the class began in June 2020, with deliveries expected in 2021 and 2022. In January 2020, two new ro-pax vessels, named the Superstar class and to be Finnlines' largest ships upon their entry into service in 2023, were ordered from the China Merchants Jinling Shipyard.

== Services ==
Finnlines' roro cargo ships serve Finland, Sweden, Poland, Germany, Denmark, the Netherlands, Belgium, the United Kingdom, Ireland, and Spain. Finnlines also maintains freight/passenger services on the routes Helsinki–Travemünde, Naantali–Kapellskär, Malmö–Travemünde and Malmö–Świnoujście.

=== Freight/passenger services ===
Ship	Type	Built	Entered service	Gross tonnage	Passengers	Knots	Route	Port of registry	Image
MS Finnpartner	Ro-pax ferry	1995	1995	33,313 GT	280	21	Malmö–Travemünde	Malmö, Sweden	
MS Finntrader	Ro-pax ferry	1995	1995	33,313 GT	280	21	Malmö–Travemünde	Malmö, Sweden	
MS Finnfellow	Ro-pax ferry	2000	2003	33,816 GT	452	22	Malmö–Świnoujście	Malmö, Sweden	
MS Finnstar	Ro-pax ferry	2006	2006	45,923 GT	554	22	Vuosaari–Travemünde	Mariehamn, Finland	
MS Finnmaid	Ro-pax ferry	2006	2006	45,923 GT	554	22	Vuosaari–Travemünde	Mariehamn, Finland	
MS Finnlady	Ro-pax ferry	2007	2007	45,923 GT	554	22	Vuosaari–Travemünde	Mariehamn, Finland	
MS Finnswan	Ro-pax ferry	2007	2007	45,923 GT	554	22	Malmö–Travemünde	Malmö, Sweden	
MS Finnsirius	Ro-Pax ferry	2023	2023	65,692 GT	1,100	21	Naantali–Långnäs–Kapellskär	Mariehamn, Finland	
MS Finncanopus	Ro-Pax ferry	2023	2024	65,692 GT	1,100	21	Naantali–Långnäs–Kapellskär	Mariehamn, Finland	

=== Freight services ===
Ship	Type	Built	Entered service	Gross tonnage	Route	Port of registry	Image
MS Finnmill	Ro-ro ferry	2002	2002	25,732 GT	Rostock - Hanko	Helsinki, Finland	
MS Finnpulp	Ro-ro ferry	2002	2002	11,682 GT	Rostock - Hanko	Helsinki, Finland	
MS New Amsterdam	Ro-ro ferry	2003	2015	23,235 GT	Chartered to Dutch MoD from 2022	Amsterdam, Netherlands	
MS Finnbreeze	Ro-ro ferry	2011	2011	33,816 GT	Helsinki - Hanko - Aarhus - Travemünde	Helsinki, Finland	
MS Finnsea	Ro-ro ferry	2011	2011	33,816 GT	Hanko - Gdynia	Helsinki, Finland	
MS Finntide	Ro-ro ferry	2012	2012	33,816 GT	Helsinki - Hanko - Aarhus - Travemünde	Helsinki, Finland	
MS Finnwave	Ro-ro ferry	2012	2012	33,816 GT	Zeebrugge - Rosslare	Helsinki, Finland	
MS Finneco I	Ro-ro ferry	2022	2022	60,515 GT	Helsinki - Kotka - Antwerp - Zeebrugge - Sheerness - Bilbao	Helsinki, Finland	
MS Finneco II	Ro-ro ferry	2022	2022	60,515 GT	Helsinki - Kotka - Antwerp - Zeebrugge - Sheerness - Bilbao	Helsinki, Finland	
MS Finneco III	Ro-ro ferry	2022	2022	60,515 GT	Helsinki - Kotka - Antwerp - Zeebrugge - Sheerness - Bilbao	Helsinki, Finland	

==== Rosslare-Zeebrugge ====
Finnlines makes runs between Rosslare and Zeebrugge with six sailings per week (3 round trips).

==== Helsinki–Gdynia ====
Finnlines makes runs between Helsinki and Gdynia with three/four departures per week.

==== Helsinki–Aarhus ====
Finnlines makes runs between Helsinki and Aarhus with two departures per week.

== Future Fleet ==
On 8 April 2025, Finnlines announced that they have ordered 3 new vessels for the Finland to Germany route. They will be based on the 'Superstar-class' ferries that operate between Finland and Sweden, however will be adapted for the longer route for example by having additional cabins and restaurants suited to different passenger preferences. This order will be delivered between 2028 and 2030 by China Merchants Jinling Shipyard (Weihai), as part of a bigger 9 vessel order for the Grimaldi fleet. The other 6 are all to operate in Mediterranean Sea, 4 are for Grimaldi Lines and 2 are for Minoan Lines. At 240m long, these vessels will be capable of running on Methanol and carry 5,100 lane metres of freight and 1,100 passengers in 320 cabins.

== Former Fleet ==
Ship	Type	Built	Entered service	Year left	Gross tonnage	Passengers	Information	Image
GTS Finnjet	Cruiseferry	1977	1977	1987	24,605 GT		Transferred to Silja Line in 1987. Scrapped in 2008.	
MS Malmö Link	Ro-ro ferry	1980	1980	2007	33,163 GT	240	Built as MS Finnhawk.	
MS Lübeck Link	Ro-ro ferry	1980	1980	2007	33,163 GT	240	Built as MS Finnrose.	
MS Finnsailor	Ro-ro ferry	1987	1987	2015	20,783 GT	119	Chartered to Navirail then DFDS from 2015 to 2016, when she was sold to the former. Sold to Tallink as MS Sailor in 2020.	
MS Finnhansa	Ro-ro ferry	1994	1994; 2014	2009; 2014	32,531 GT	90	Operated for Grimaldi from 2009 to 2014 and 2014 to 2022. Sold to Transmed in 2022.	
MS Transeuropa	Ro-ro ferry	1995	1997	2013	32,534 GT	90	Transferred to Grimaldi in 2013. Caught fire and deemed a total loss on 18 February 2022.	
MS Finnarrow	Ro-Pax ferry	1996	1997	2013	25,996 GT	200	Transferred to Grimaldi in 2013. Currently Mazovia for Polferries.	
MS Birka Express	Ro-ro ferry	1997	2001	2013	12,251 GT		Chartered from Birka Cargo.	
MS Finncarrier	Ro-ro ferry	1998	2001; 2016	2013; 2019	12,251 GT		Previously chartered from Birka Cargo. Sold to Color Line as Color Carrier.	
MS Finnmaster	Ro-ro ferry	1998	2001; 2016	2013; 2022	12,251 GT		Previously chartered from Birka Cargo. Sold to Grimaldi as Eurocargo Sicilia.	
MS Finnclipper	Ro-Pax ferry	1999	1999	2022	29,841 GT	440	Ordered by Stena Line, sold on delivery to Finnlines. Sold to Grimaldi in 2022.	
MS Finneagle	Ro-Pax ferry	1999	1999	2017	29,841 GT	440	Ordered by Stena RoRo as MV Stena Seapacer 2, bought before delivery in 1998. Sold to Grimaldi in 2017. Currently Vizzavona for Corsica Linea.	
MS Finnkraft	Ro-ro ferry	2001	2001	2024	11,671 GT		Sold to Fred Olsen Cargo in April 2024 as Bentayga Cargo.	
MS Finnhawk	Ro-ro ferry	2001	2001	2024	11,671 GT		Sold to Fred Olsen Cargo in November 2024 as Bahia Cargo.	
MS Europalink	Ro-Pax ferry	2007	2007	2024	46,124 GT		Transferred to Grimaldi in 2024.	
MS Finnsun	Ro-ro ferry	2012	2012	2024	33,816 GT		Transferred to Grimaldi in 2024 as Eurocargo Valencia.	
