= Morocco Star =

Ferry built in 1980

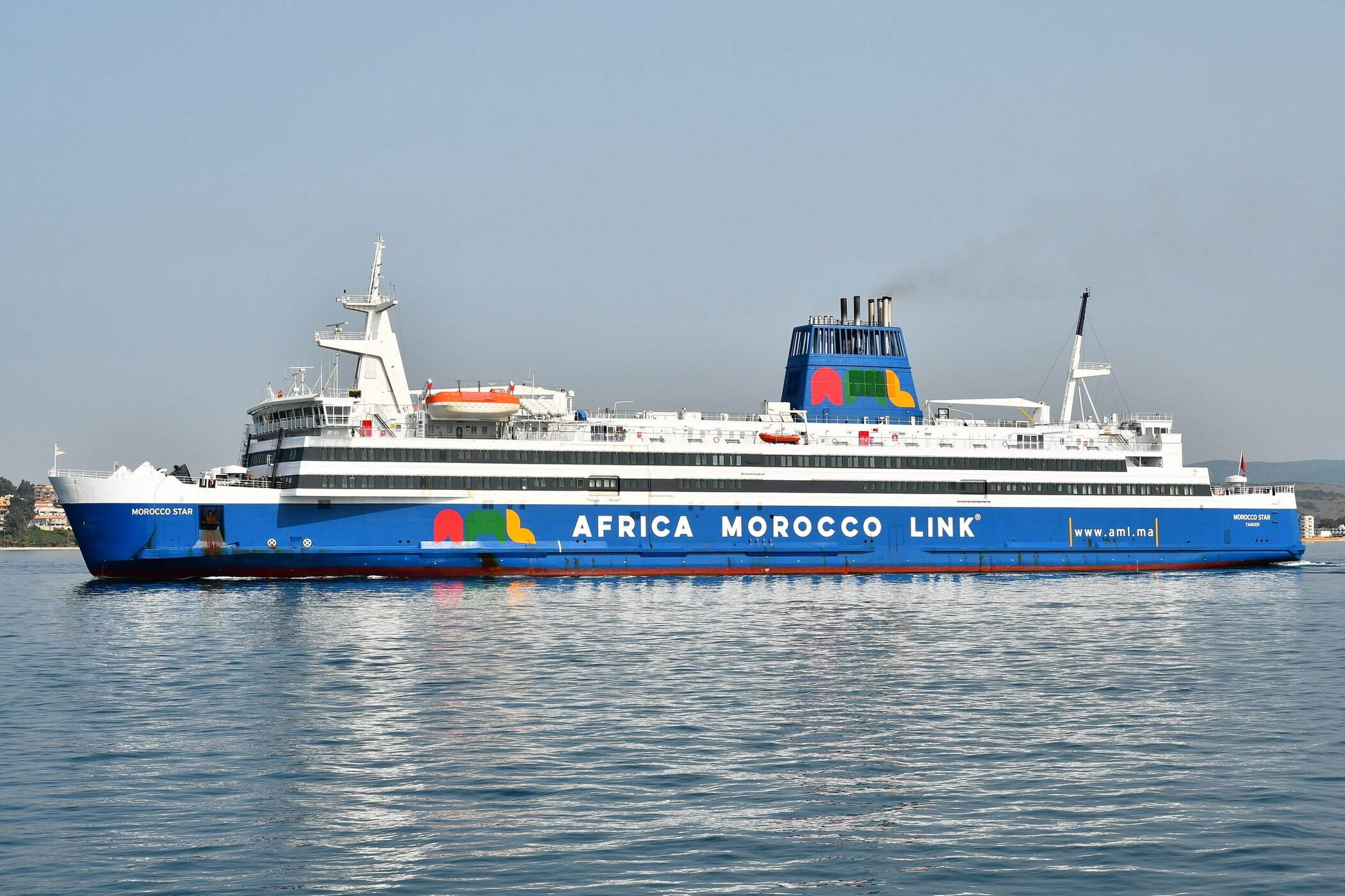
- Morocco Star in Algeciras

History
- Name: 1980–2016: Prins Joachim; 2016: Prince; 2016–present: Morocco Star
- Owner: 1980–1995: DSB Rederi; 1995–2016: Scandlines; 2016: Euroferries / European Seaways; 2016–present: Tanger Morocco Maritime SA / SL Shipping Morocco SARL
- Operator: 1980–1995: DSB Rederi; 1995–2016: Scandlines; 2016–present: Africa Morocco Link (AML)
- Port of registry: 1980–1997: Korsør, Denmark; 1997–2016: Rostock, Germany; 2016: Limassol, Cyprus; 2016–present: Tangier, Morocco
- Route: Algeciras – Tanger Med; Former: Gedser – Rostock; Former: Korsør – Nyborg
- Ordered: 1978
- Builder: Nakskov Skibsværft; Nakskov, Denmark
- Yard number: 223
- Laid down: 1979
- Launched: 25 January 1980
- Completed: 10 October 1980
- Acquired: 2016
- Maiden voyage: October 1980
- In service: 1980
- Identification: IMO number: 7803190; Call sign: CNA5167; MMSI number: 242579300
- Status: in service

General characteristics
- Class & type: Custom Nakskov Ro-Pax Ferry
- Tonnage: 16,071 GT (originally 10,609 GT); 2,971 DWT
- Length: 152.20 m (499 ft 4 in)
- Beam: 23.70 m (77 ft 9 in)
- Draught: 5.20 m (17 ft 1 in)
- Depth: 7.80 m (25 ft 7 in)
- Decks: 8
- Ramps: Bow visor and stern loading ramps
- Ice class: 1A
- Installed power: 4 × MaK 8M32C + 2 × MaK 6M32 diesel engines (installed 2004; total 22,000 kW / 29,910 hp)
- Propulsion: 2 × controllable pitch propellers
- Speed: 19.0 knots (35.2 km/h; 21.9 mph) (service) / 22.0 knots (40.7 km/h; 25.3 mph) (max)
- Capacity: 935 passengers (cabin/lounge accommodation); 230 vehicles / 755 lane metres for freight
- Crew: 35–50

Morocco Star is a 152.20-metre Ro-Pax passenger and vehicle ferry owned by Tanger Morocco Maritime SA / SL Shipping Morocco SARL and operated by Africa Morocco Link (AML). Built in 1980 by Nakskov Skibsværft in Denmark as Prins Joachim for DSB Rederi, she spent over three decades operating key Baltic Sea routes for Scandlines before being acquired by AML, extensively refitted, and renamed Morocco Star in 2016.

== Service ==
The ferry, the second of a series of three sister units used for the transport of railway wagons and cars, was launched on 25 January 1980 at the Nakskov Skibsværft shipyard in Nakskov with the name Prins Joachim and christened on 2 July by Prince Joachim of Denmark, to whom the unit was dedicated, in conjunction with the launching and christening of the third sister Kronprins Frederik by Crown Prince Frederik of Denmark. Delivered on 10 October 1980 to the Danish railways DSB, it officially entered service on 26 October on the routes between Korsør and Nyborg, where it was operated alongside the first sister Dronning Ingrid. On 1 January 1997, with the merger of DSB with the German company DBO, it was then transferred to the newly formed Scandlines, continuing to serve the route.

On 31 May 1997, with the opening of the new bridge over the Great Belt, the ferry, after more than sixteen years of service on the route, was laid up in Nyborg together with her sister ships awaiting employment. After about two years out of service, on 3 December 2000, the ferry was transferred to the Fredericia shipyards, where she underwent major conversion work into a passenger ferry, as had already been done on the Kronprins Frederik, which allowed the maximum capacity for transporting rubber-tyred vehicles to be increased to 225, at the expense of the passenger capacity, reduced from 2280 to 1400. On 29 March 2001, after the conversion was completed, the ferry returned to service on the routes between Gedser and Rostock, where she operated alongside the Kronprins Frederik.

On 10 November 2001, while sailing off Gedser, the ferry ran aground on a sandbank, remaining stuck there for approximately 13 hours, before being freed. From 17 August to 18 October 2004, she underwent re-engine work at the Blohm + Voss shipyard in Hamburg, where her old B&W engines were replaced with six new MaK engines.

On 8 August 2012 the ferry suffered engine failure while underway, drifting for approximately three hours until it was rescued by its sister ship Kronprins Frederik, which carried spare parts needed to repair the vessel.

On 4 June 2013, shortly before arriving in Rostock, a fire broke out in the ferry's engine room, which was quickly put out by the crew. However, while trying to put out the fire, a seafarer suffered smoke inhalation and was forced to abandon the ferry.

In April 2016, with the entry into service of the new Berlin, the ferry was sold to European Seaways, to whom, after the Baltic Sea service ended on 23 May, it was handed over on 25 May, the day on which it was renamed Prince. The following day it finally sailed from Rostock to the Salamis Shipyard in Ampelakia,to undergo some renovations for its new deployment in the Mediterranean.

On 9 July 2016, after completion of the works in Attica, the ferry began service on the routes between Igoumenitsa, Corfu and Brindisi, where it operated until 10 September, replacing the Galaxy, which never entered service and was sold to Moby Lines. After completing the summer service between Greece and Puglia, on 16 September it was then transferred to the routes between Brindisi and Vlora, left uncovered after the sale of the European Voyager by Red Star Ferries to Moby Lines.

On 26 December 2016, following the acquisition of the Galaxy by the Greek company, it was taken out of service and transferred to Ampelakia, where, two days later, it was announced that it would be sold to the Moroccan company Africa Morocco Link. Renamed Morocco Star, the ferry then sailed from Greece to the shipyards in Valletta, where it underwent a short technical stop in preparation for entering service on the routes between Algeciras and Tangier Med, which took place on 1 April of the same year.

On 29 July 2022, while stationed in Tangier Med, the ferry was rammed by the Ciudad de Malaga, moored in the Moroccan port, suffering damage to its bow.

On 23 August 2023, a generator in the ferry's engine room caught fire, and the ferry, partially damaged in the fire, was towed to a shipyard in Gibraltar and repaired, returning to service only on 9 January 2024.

== Sister ships ==
- Africa Mercy
- Kronprins Frederik
