= Ken Isaacs (executive) =

American executive

- Occupation: Humanitarian aid organization executive
- Organization: Samaritan's Purse
- Known for: Nominee for Director General of IOM

Ken Isaacs is an American executive with Christian humanitarian organization Samaritan's Purse.

He served as the director of the Office of Foreign Disaster Assistance for the United States Agency for International Development from 2004 to 2005 during President George W. Bush's administration. In February 2018, Isaacs was nominated by President Donald Trump to be the US candidate to run for Director General of the United Nations International Organization for Migration (IOM). Isaacs' nomination stirred controversy given his record of anti-Muslim sentiments. Isaacs's nomination was rejected by the UN. It was only the second time since the creation of the IOM in 1951 that the body would not be headed by an American.

== Career ==
Isaacs began working with Samaritan's Purse in 1988 after meeting the organization's President, Franklin Graham, in Boone, North Carolina. That year, he moved his family to Ethiopia where he helped build clean water wells for residents affected by the Ethiopian Civil War. Isaacs would later assist in and organize relief efforts in a variety of locations, including Rwanda (during the Rwandan genocide in 1994), Somalia, El Salvador, Bosnia, Sudan, and Afghanistan. In 2004, Isaacs was appointed to the position of director of the Office of Foreign Disaster Assistance (OFDA), an organizational arm of the U.S. Agency for International Development. The OFDA oversaw relief efforts for the 2004 Indian Ocean tsunami and the 2005 Kashmir earthquake. Isaacs left his position in 2005.

Isaacs later returned to Samaritan's Purse as the Vice President of Programs and Government Relations. In 2011, he was the head of the organization's disaster response team for the Tōhoku earthquake and tsunami in Japan. In 2014, Isaacs testified before a House Foreign Affairs subcommittee, criticizing the government's response to and effort to combat the spread of Ebola in Guinea, Liberia, and Sierra Leone.

On February 1, 2018, the U.S. State Department announced Isaacs' nomination to the post of Director General of the International Organization for Migration (IOM). The 169 member states of the IOM rejected his candidacy on June 29, 2018, the first time since 1951 that the organization will not be led by an American.

== Controversies ==
At the time of Isaacs's nomination for the directorship at IOM, he was in Bangladesh, providing diphtheria treatments to Rohingya refugees as part of his work for Samaritan's Purse. Soon after the announcement, The Washington Post published a report that reviewed radio appearances, tweets, and social media posts in which Isaacs appeared to be critical of Islam. His Twitter account was soon made private, and he issued a statement saying, "I deeply regret that my comments on social media have caused hurt and have undermined my professional record."

A separate report by CNN in March 2018 reviewed retweets and other content on Isaacs' Twitter account said to contain "anti-Muslim sentiments." After the report, Isaacs told reporters to "judge my actions" (in reference to his humanitarian work with Samaritan's Purse) and also noted that "retweets are not endorsements." He also cited his work in majority Muslim nations.
