= My Mercy Box =

Norwegian TV documentary series

- Country of origin: Norway
- Original language: Norwegian

My Mercy Box is a Norwegian documentary series for children and families, produced by the Norwegian production company TV Inter. The original title in Norway is Fride på Skipet, and the series was aired at the children's network NRK Super, spring 2010. The first of ten episodes was broadcast 8 April 2010. It is about eight-year-old Fride Tvedt, living on the hospital ship MS Africa Mercy. The ship sails along the coast of West Africa in a humanitarian effort for the Christian organization Mercy Ships. Fride's father is a dentist and her mother is a nurse. Fride's older brother and sister also live on board.

Over ten episodes, the audience can follow Fride and her family on board the ship and on trips within Benin. Each episode ends with Fride writing a postcard to her grandmother in Norway, as she goes to bed. In the final episode she goes home to see Grandma.

The show had excellent ratings in Norway and was among the most popular children's TV series of spring 2010, with ratings up to 80% of all viewers between the age of 2–12. It was also one of the most watched programs on NRK Supers web site spring 2010.

On 1 November 2010 the series premiered on Dutch KRO television, with 112,000 viewers. The local title is Fride op het schip. It was also shown at the children's film festival Cinekid (Cinekid.nl) in Amsterdam on 29 October 2010.

On 17 November 2010 the DVD was released in the Norwegian market. It can at present be preordered at Nordic World, who is also presently selling the series to networks worldwide, by the international title My Mercy Box. Fride came up with that name herself, as she thinks the ship, Africa Mercy, looks like a box.

The series is produced by TV Inter Norway in coproduction with NRK Super Norway (Gitte Calmeyer) and KRO Youth Netherlands (Jan-Willem Bult). Director and producer: Thomas Dubourcq
