= The Surgery Ship =

- Directed by: Madeleine Hetherton-Miau (film); Alex Barry (TV series)
- Written by: Madeleine Hetherton-Miau
- Music by: John Gray
- Release date: 2013
- Running time: 78 minutes
- Countries: Australia; Guinea
- Language: English

The Surgery Ship is an Australian documentary film (2013) directed by Madeleine Hetherton-Miau, and a documentary television series (2016) of the same name directed by Alex Barry, both based on the real-life events filmed on board the hospital ship the "Africa Mercy".

== Synopsis ==
Both the film and TV series are based on the real life events filmed on board the hospital ship the "Africa Mercy".

The Africa Mercy hospital ship is run by non-governmental organisation "Mercy Ships", an international charity which has run hospital ships, primarily in West Africa since 1982. Mercy Ships offer surgical aid. Mercy Ships operates in primarily in West Africa, although recently it visited Madagascar for two field services.

== Production ==
The single-feature documentary was first commissioned in 2012 by Australian TV broadcaster SBS (Special Broadcast Service). Filming took place when the Africa Mercy was docked in Conakry, Guinea, in 2012–2013.

John Gray composed the film score.

In 2015 National Geographic commissioned The Surgery Ship as an eight-episode series. Filming commenced on board the ship again in August 2016. The series was due for broadcast mid-2017 on National Geographic Channel.

The film was directed by Madeleine Hetherton-Miau, and the TV series by Alex Barry.

Both the film and the TV series were produced by Madeleine Hetherton-Miau and Rebecca Barry, founders of production company Media Stockade, an independent film production company specialising in documentary films.

== Release ==
The completed film was broadcast in December 2013 in Australia, followed by international festival release in 2014 of the longer feature documentary.

== Reception ==
The Surgery Ship single-feature documentary was successful screening at multiple festivals.

The TV broadcast of The Surgery Ship garnered many positive reviews, including major Australian newspapers such as The Sydney Morning Herald, TV Tonight, News.com & Global Health Gateway.

The Surgery Ship series was broadcast to strong critical support in 2017 on National Geographic People Channel.

== Awards and nominations ==
The film won a number of awards, including Best Film at the Sarasota International Film festival.

The film score was nominated Best Music for a Feature Documentary at the 2015 Milan International Film Festival

The TV series won a number of awards, including Best Human Interest Documentary at the Association for International Broadcasters (AIB). and Best Direction in a Series at the ADG awards

== Release ==
Both titles are distributed by TVF, an English-based television distribution company.

The Surgery Ship series was made available to watch without subscription on National Geographic channel in the U.S. for the first time in 2023.
