= MV Anastasis =

Motor ship built in 1953

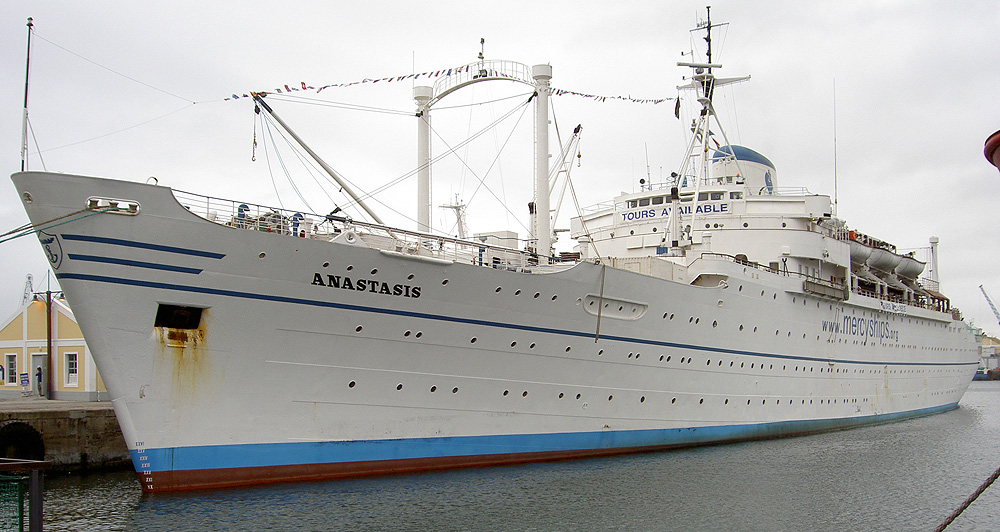
- Anastasis

History
- Name: 1953–1978: Victoria; 1978–2007: Anastasis
- Operator: 1953–1974: Lloyd Triestino; 1974–1978: Adriatica; 1978–2007: Mercy Ships
- Port of registry: 1978–2007: Valletta, Malta
- Builder: Cantieri Riuniti dell' Adriatico, Trieste
- Yard number: 1765
- Launched: 18 September 1951
- In service: Victoria (1953–1978); Anastasis (1978–2007)
- Identification: IMO number: 5379729
- Fate: Retired from service: 2007; Disassembled in Alang

General characteristics
- Type: Ocean liner later Hospital ship
- Tonnage: 11,695 GRT
- Length: 159.00 m (521 ft 8 in)
- Beam: 21.00 m (68 ft 11 in)
- Draught: 7.00 m (23 ft 0 in)
- Installed power: Fiat-type diesel engines, 16,100 bhp (12,000 kW)
- Speed: 19.5 knots (36.1 km/h; 22.4 mph)
- Crew: 1953–1978: 220; 1978–2007: 350

MV Anastasis was a 159-metre (521 ft 8 in), 11,695 GRT hospital ship owned and operated by the humanitarian organization Mercy Ships. Formerly named Victoria, an Italian ocean liner built in 1953, the ship was purchased at scrap value of US $1 million in 1978. The ship was renovated and equipped as a fully functioning hospital ship to serve as the flagship of the Mercy Ships fleet for 29 years until being succeeded by MV Africa Mercy in 2007.

== Service history ==
=== Early years and operational design ===
After purchase of Victoria in Italy, the ship was towed to Eleusis, Greece where Mercy Ships spent four years renovating the cruise liner into a self-contained hospital ship, with three operating rooms, a 40-bed hospital ward, a dental clinic, and hospital support services including x-ray equipment and a laboratory. The ship was renamed Anastasis, the Greek word for resurrection, and sailed out of Greece on July 7, 1982 to her port of registry in Valletta, Malta. Anastasis subsequently crossed the Atlantic Ocean and the Panama Canal to dock in Los Angeles for her first supply and fundraising trip. Her first relief effort was conducted in the port of Champerico, Guatemala, where Mercy Ships delivered food, seeds, clothing, and building materials.

Anastasis was staffed by a crew of volunteers from around the world, including surgeons, nurses, anesthesia providers, mariners, and other ancillary service providers such as cooks and housekeeping staff. Mercy Ships maintain this volunteer-based staffing model to date, as well as employing local day-workers to serve as translators and patient aides in each nation they visit.

=== Field service ===
Anastasis visited 275 ports over her lifespan, conducting 66 field assignments in 23 nations. When she was not conducting field services in developing nations, Anastasis visited ports worldwide for purposes of fundraising, publicity, maintenance, and resupply. From 1982 to 1988 the ship conducted primarily supply and relief operations, as well as being held up for 18 months to conduct further renovations to meet SOLAS standards as a passenger ship. In 1988, Anastasis performed her first field service as a fully functioning hospital ship in Lazaro Cardenas, Mexico, where ophthalmic, maxillofacial, and plastic reconstructive surgeries were performed on board the ship by volunteer medical crew.

After conducting a tour of Europe to raise funds and awareness about Mercy Ships, Anastasis set sail in 1990 for her first visit to Africa, where Mercy Ships' focus would remain henceforth. Anastasis was originally headed to Ghana after several years of planning, but Mercy Ships' governmental invitation was frozen three weeks before departure. The ship instead went to Togo for her first African field service, visiting Guinea and Cote d'Ivoire next in 1991. In 1992 Anastasis visited Sierra Leone which, like Togo, Mercy Ships would return to repeatedly; both nations have hosted a Mercy Ship five times to date.

Anastasis made her final West African visit in 2007 to Liberia, where Mercy Ships' next vessel, MV Africa Mercy, met with the ship to take over.

At the end of its career, Anastasis needed "continuous major repairs" and was retired in 2007 and sailed to the ship breaking yard in Alang, India, for disassembly.
