= Poeta Lòpez Anglada =

Ferry built in France

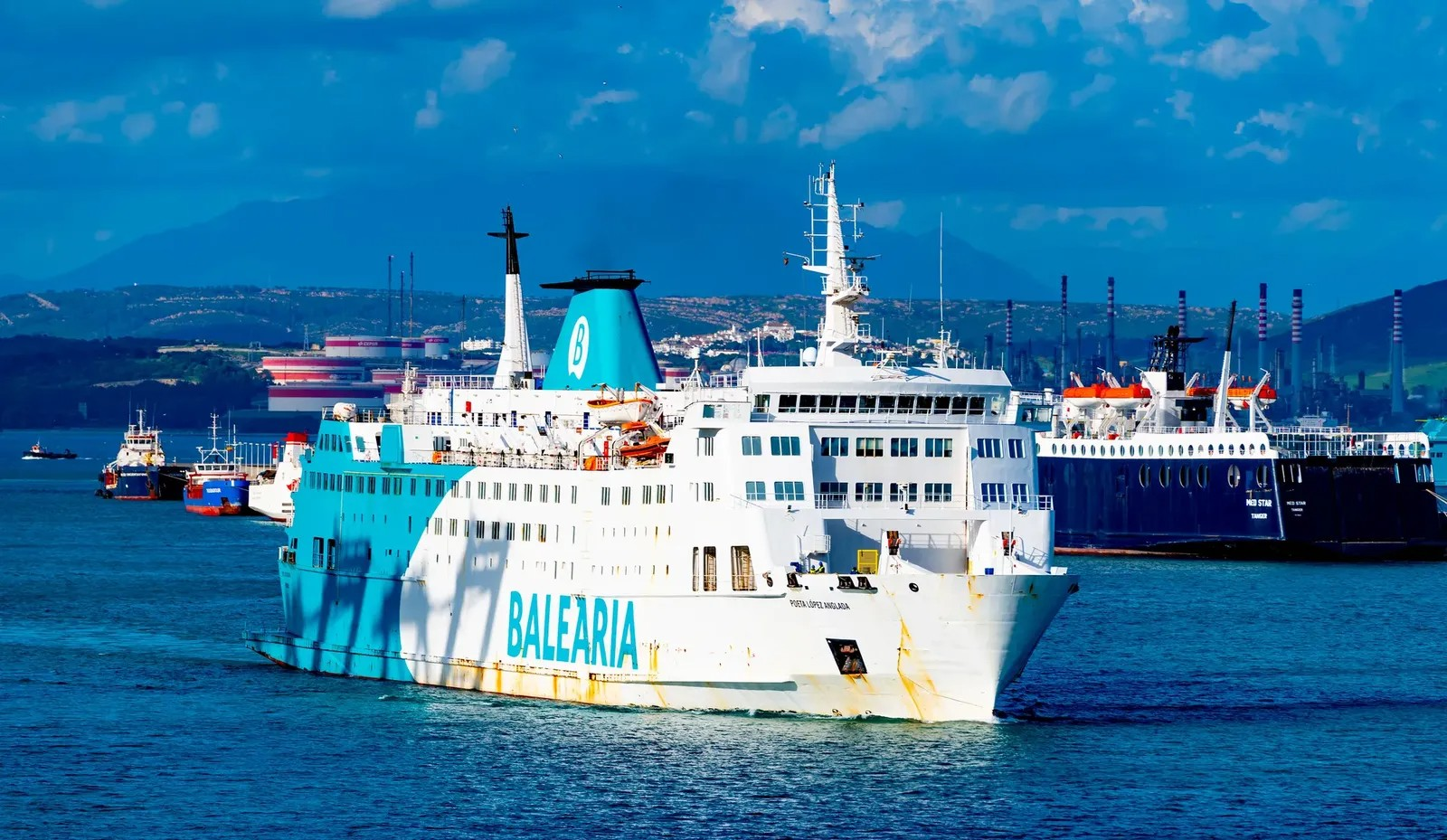
- Poeta Lòpez Anglada in Gibraltar

History
- Name: 1984–1990: Champs Élysées; 1990–1997: Stena Parisien; 1997–2009: Seafrance Manet; 2009–2012: Stena Navigator; 2012–2013: Daniya; 2013–present: Poeta López Anglada
- Owner: 1984–1990: SNCF; 1990–1997: SPN (Societé Propietaires des Navaires); 1997: Sealink Stena Line; 1997–2009: SeaFrance; 2009–2012: Stena Line; 2012–present: Baleària
- Operator: 1984–1992: SNCF; 1992–1997: Sealink Stena Line (chartered); 1997–2009: SeaFrance; 2009–2011: Stena Line; 2012–present: Baleària
- Port of registry: Dunkirk, France (1984–1987); Calais, France (1987–1990, 1997–2009); Dieppe, France (1990–1997); London, United Kingdom (2009–2012); Santa Cruz de Tenerife, Spain (2012–2019); Limassol, Cyprus (2019–present)
- Route: Algeciras ↔ Tanger Med
- Builder: Chantiers Dubigeon S.A.; Nantes, France
- Yard number: 167
- Laid down: 1 January 1983
- Launched: 21 December 1983
- Completed: 2 October 1984
- Acquired: February 2012
- Maiden voyage: 4 October 1984
- In service: 1984
- Identification: IMO number: 8208763; Call sign: 5BHG5; MMSI number: 209678000
- Status: In service

General characteristics
- Class & type: Ro-Pax Ferry
- Tonnage: 15,093 GT; 8,965 NT; 2,430 DWT
- Length: 130.0 m (426 ft 6 in)
- Beam: 23.02 m (75 ft 6 in)
- Draft: 5.0 m (16 ft 5 in)
- Ramps: Bow and stern loading ramps
- Installed power: 2 × SEMT Pielstick 16PC2/6V 400 diesel engines (total 15,840 kW)
- Propulsion: 2 × controllable pitch propellers
- Speed: 18.5 knots (34.3 km/h; 21.3 mph)
- Capacity: 1,192 passengers; 330 cars / 850 lane metres
- Crew: 65

Poeta López Anglada is a French-built passenger/vehicle ferry operated by Baleària across the Strait of Gibraltar, predominantly serving the Algeciras–Ceuta route. Launched in 1984 as Champs Élysées for SNCF on the Dover–Calais English Channel crossing, the 130-meter vessel underwent multiple ownership and name changes—including Stena Parisien and SeaFrance Manet—before being acquired by Baleària in 2012 and renamed in honor of Spanish poet Luis López Anglada.

== History ==
=== SNCF ===
Champs Elysées was built in 1984 by Chantiers Dubigeon, Prairie-au-Duc, Nantes, for SNCF's Calais to Dover services, which were shared with their Sealink partners. She also operated between Boulogne and Dover. In 1990, ownership of Champs Elysées was transferred to Societé Propietaire des Navaires (SPN), in which Stena Line took a 49% interest (Stena having acquired the UK-owned Sealink operation).

=== SPN ===
In 1990, ownership of Champs Elysées was transferred to Societé Propietaire des Navaires (SPN), in which Stena Line took a 49% interest (Stena having acquired the UK-owned Sealink operation). Champs Elysées was transferred to the Newhaven-Dieppe service, which at that time was run by SPN.

=== Stena Sealink ===
In 1992 Champs Elysées was chartered to Sealink Stena Line when they took over the Newhaven-Dieppe service, for which she was renamed Stena Parisien. In 1997 the charter was ended, and Stena Parisien entered service between Dover-Calais for SeaFrance as SeaFrance Manet.

=== SeaFrance ===
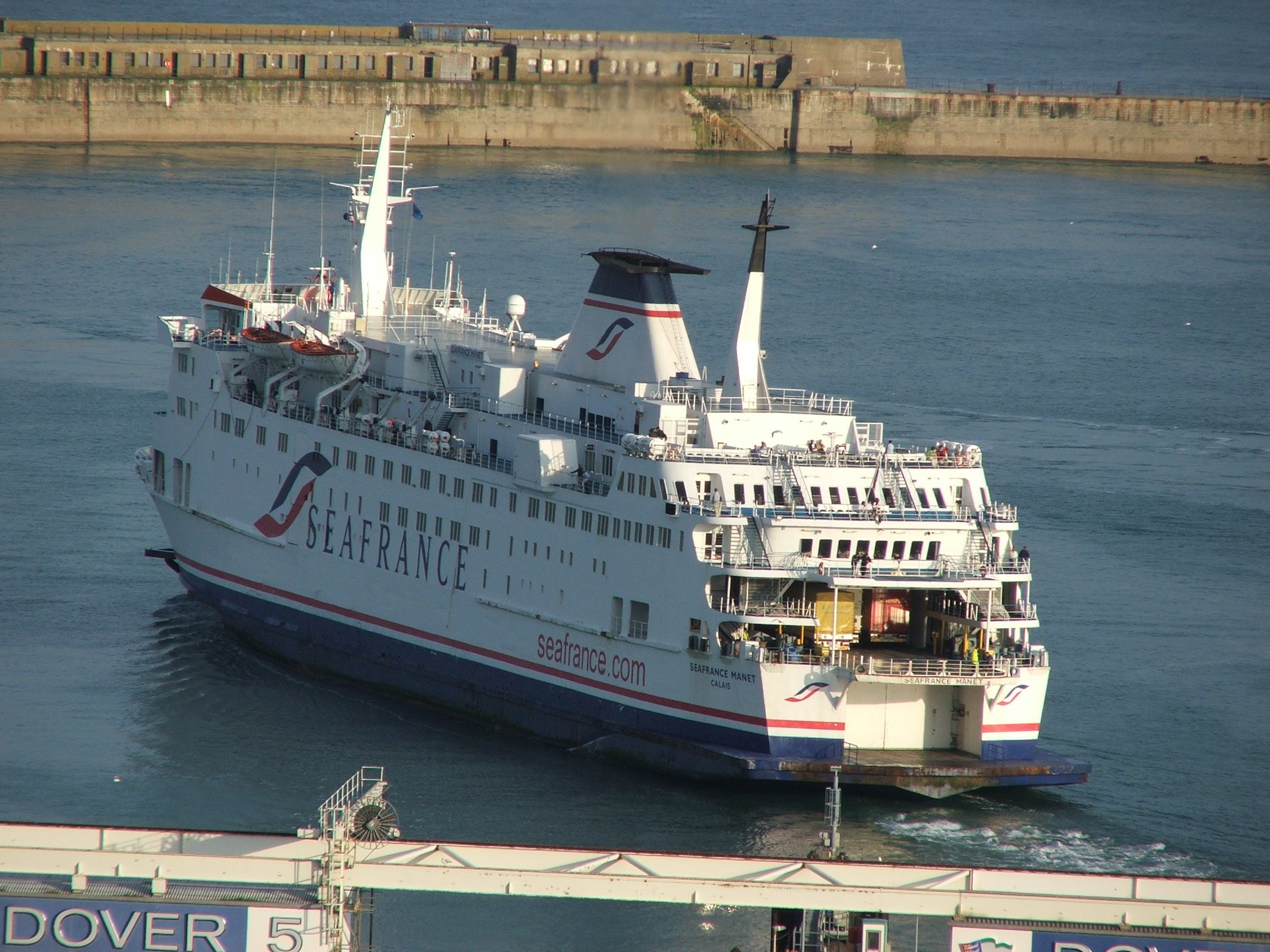
SeaFrance Manet leaving Port of Dover in July 2005

In 1997, the Stena Line charter was ended, and Stena Parisien entered service between Dover-Calais for SeaFrance as the SeaFrance Manet. In 1999, Stena Line sold their 49% back to SPN. On 27 December 2007, SeaFrance announced that they have purchased a new vessel to replace both the Seafrance Manet and Seafrance Renoir. The SeaFrance Manet was retained by SeaFrance as a spare vessel in the fleet, until 2009. 29 April 2008 saw the final sailing of SeaFrance Manet between Dover – Calais. Afterwards, she was laid up in Calais.

=== Stena Line ===
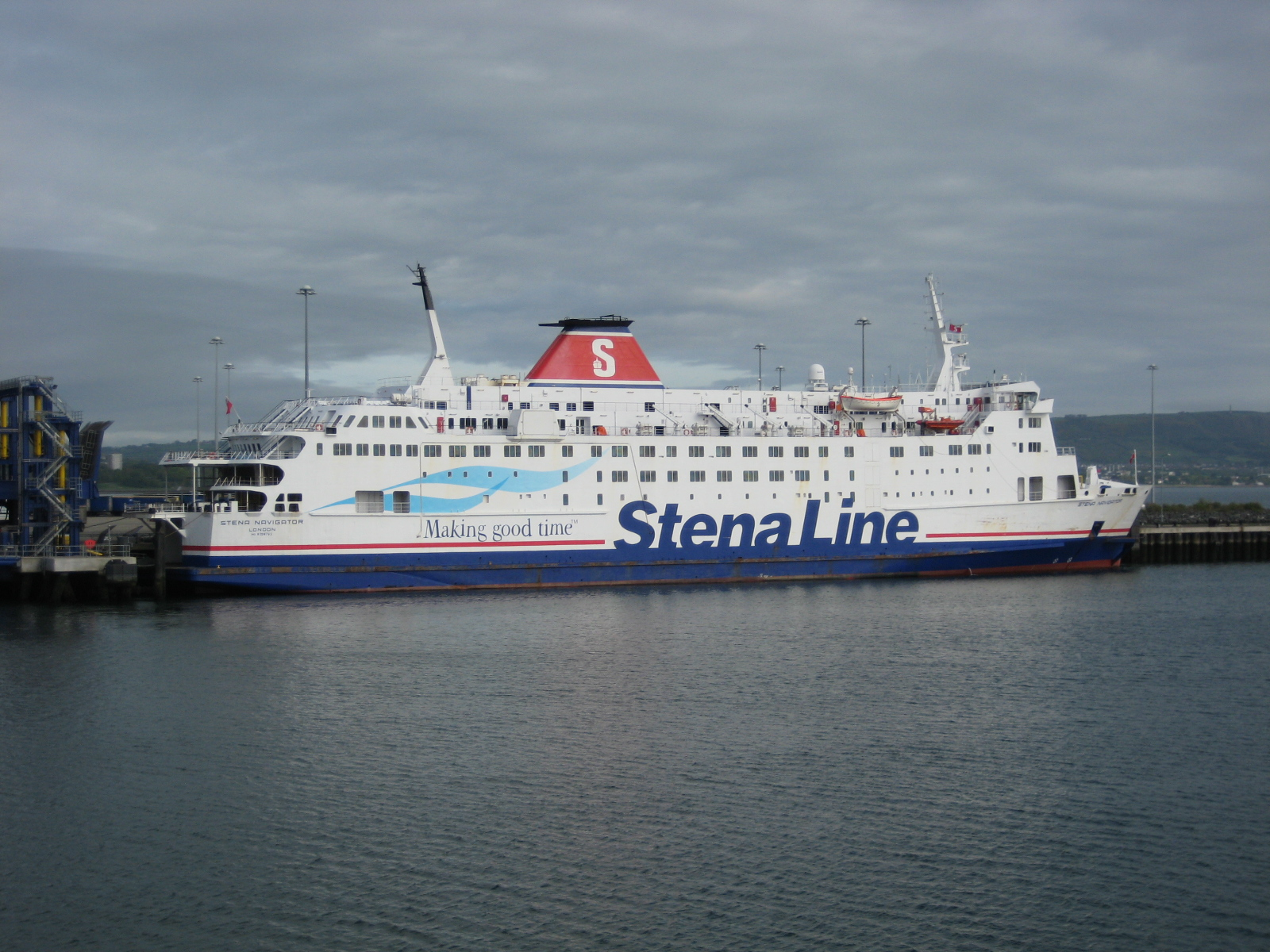
Stena Navigator in Belfast in April 2011

On 8 July 2009, Stena Line officially announced they were purchasing the SeaFrance Manet to operate on their Belfast – Stranraer route. After a comprehensive refit she joined the Stena Caledonia and Stena Voyager in the autumn of 2009. In March 2011, Stena Line announced the Stena Navigator and her running partners on the Belfast – Stranraer route (Stena Caledonia and Stena Voyager) were to be replaced in autumn 2011 by the Stena Superfast VII and Stena Superfast VIII chartered from Estonian ferry operator Tallink. The Stena Navigator was withdrawn from service with on 16 November 2011.

=== Baleària ===
Three months after the closure of the Stranraer route, The Stena Navigator departed Belfast on 17 February bound for the Astander shipyard in Santander. The vessel was repainted in the Baleària livery and renamed Daniya.

She entered service for Balaeria during April operating out of Denia on the routes San Antonio–Palma and San Antonio–Barcelona, with much of her Stena interior still in place.

In November 2013, Daniya was renamed Poeta Lòpez Anglada and moved to the Algeciras–Ceuta route. She was quickly moved on to the Alcudia-Ciutadella route before returning to the Algeciras–Ceuta route in July 2014.

In February 2016 the ship was fitted with a new bow ramp to improve the loading and discharge of vehicles. The work was carried out at Astilleros del Guadalquivir in Seville. At the same time she was also surveyed and repainted.

== Sister ship ==
The Stena Navigator had one sister ship, the SeaFrance Renoir which was scrapped in 2011. They are close sister ships but they aren't identical ferries. For example, windows on the Renoir were smaller than in the Daniya.
