= MS Port Link =

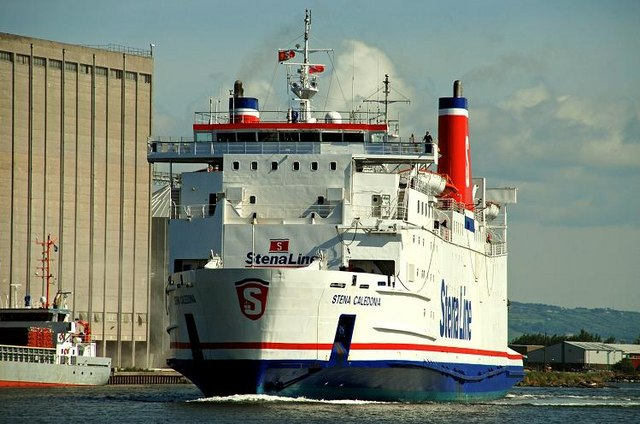
- Stena Caledonia at Belfast

History
- Name: 1981-1990: St David; 1990-2012: Stena Caledonia; 2012 onwards: Port Link
- Operator: 1981-1984: Sealink; 1984-1990: Sealink British Ferries; 1990-1993: Sealink Stena Line; 1993-1995: Stena Sealink Line; 1995-2012: Stena Line; 2012 onwards: ASDP Indonesia Ferry
- Port of registry: 1981 – 1990: London, (United Kingdom); 1990-2012: Stranraer, (United Kingdom); 2012 onwards: Jakarta, Indonesia
- Route: Merak–Bakauheni (Executive Express Ferry)
- Builder: Harland & Wolff, Belfast
- Yard number: 1717
- Launched: 25 September 1980
- Maiden voyage: 10 August 1981
- Identification: IMO number: 7910917
- Status: Active

General characteristics (as built)
- Tonnage: 7,197 GRT; 2,206 DWT
- Length: 129.65 m (425 ft 4 in)
- Beam: 21.02 m (69 ft 0 in)
- Draught: 4.84 m (15 ft 11 in)
- Installed power: 2 x 10,400 bhp Crossley Pielstick 16PC2V Mk5 diesels
- Propulsion: 2 × controllable pitch propellers; 2 × bow thrusters
- Speed: 19.5 knots (36 km/h)
- Capacity: 1,154 passengers; 309 cars; 62 × 12 m freight vehicles

General characteristics (after 1999 rebuild)
- Tonnage: 12,619 GT
- Length: 131 m (429 ft 9 in)
- Beam: 22 m (72 ft 2 in)
- Draught: 5 m (16 ft 5 in)
- Deck clearance: 4.4 m (14 ft 5 in)
- Installed power: as built
- Propulsion: 2 × controllable pitch propellers; 2 × bow thrusters
- Speed: 19.5 knots (36 km/h)
- Capacity: 1,000 passengers; 309 cars; 62 × 12 m freight vehicles

Port Link (formerly St David then Stena Caledonia) is a ro-pax ferry that was formerly operated by Sealink and Stena Line between Holyhead and Dun Laoghaire and later Stranraer and Larne / Belfast. Now it is used by ASDP Indonesia Ferry for Merak to Bakauheni line.

She was one of four Saint-class ferries built by Harland & Wolff in Belfast for Sealink.

== History ==
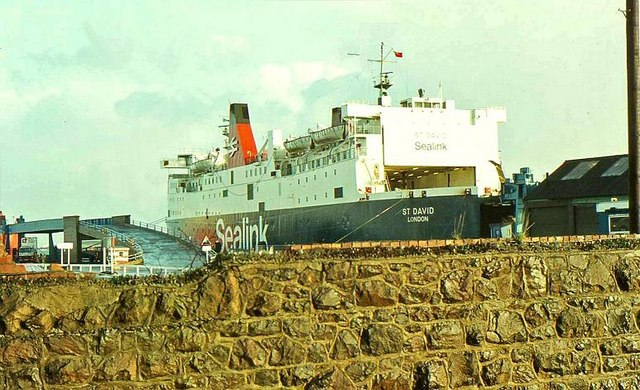
St David at Larne harbour in 1984

Port Link was built in 1980 as the St David for Sealink. She was ordered to replace the Stena Normanica on the Fishguard – Rosslare route; instead, she entered service alongside the St Columba on the Holyhead – Dún Laoghaire route

In 1985 the St David was transferred to Dover to operate a joint service with RMT to Ostend.

In 1990 Sea Containers sold Sealink British Ferries to Stena Line. The St David was renamed Stena Caledonia and returned to the Irish Sea, this time to the Stranraer – Larne route.

In order to meet the latest SOLAS regulations the Stena Caledonia was sent to Cammell Laird in 1999. Work included the addition of a duck tail sponson to the stern and a bulbous bow.

In 2009, her 29th year of service, the Stena Caledonia returned to Cammell Laird for a £1.8 million refit.

== Later years ==
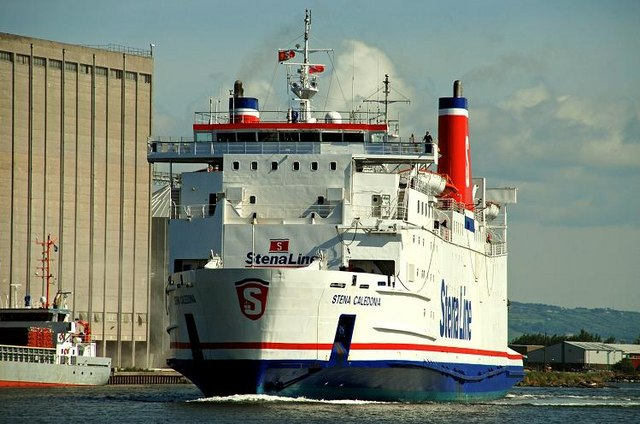
Stena Caledonia in Belfast

In March 2011, Stena Line announced the Stena Caledonia and her running partners on the Belfast – Stranraer route (Stena Navigator and Stena Voyager) were to be replaced in Autumn 2011 by the Stena Superfast VII and Stena Superfast VIII chartered from Estonian ferry operator Tallink. Stena Caledonia completed her last commercial sailing for Stena Line on 21 November 2011 when she arrived in Stranraer at 0125 and left with last ever sailing from the port with the 0430 freight only service to Belfast. Stena Caledonia was sold to ASDP Indonesia Ferry of Indonesia and was subsequently renamed Port Link. She left Belfast for the last time on 3 July 2012 en route for Indonesia via Gibraltar & Suez Canal. She reached Port Said on 23 July and after several weeks at anchor, made passage through the Suez Canal on 6 September 2012 eventually reaching Jakarta, Indonesia on 12 October 2012. In April 2013 she was still in Jakarta and soon in service in Sunda Strait Merak – Bakauheuni on regular ferry services in 2012-2020 and in 2020-onwards this ship servicing as Executive Express Ferry in the same line.

== Saint Class ==
The Port Link is the last of four similar ships built by Harland & Wolff, Belfast for Sealink between 1979 and 1980. However one unique feature was the addition of a stern bridge. This was used for manoeuvering in Holyhead harbour.

The four vessels all use the same twin level drive through design. Both vehicle decks could accommodate articulated lorries. The vessels have a distinct shape...amidships the decks are lower than at the fore and aft end. This introduces decks that slope upwards from amidships in both directions. This feature was due to the design of the upper car decks; the 'slopes' were in fact dictated by full width ramps (split longitudinally into two sections), which could be pivoted from amidships down to the lower car deck. If an upper linkspan was not available, these ramps could allow the upper deck to be unloaded via the lower deck. The slope ensured that the final angle was less than would have been the case had the decks been level.

A detailed difference among the four vessels is the use of railings rather than solid bulwarks on the St David and Galloway Princess. The other two vessels feature the solid bulwarks.

Galloway Princess
Most of her early career on the Stranraer run. Renamed Stena Galloway in 1991. Currently with IMTC, serving Algeciras – Tangiers, as Le Rif.

The vessel was smaller than her sisters, with the bridge one deck lower, at the front of the passenger accommodation. She also featured a bulbous bow, unlike her sisters.

St Anselm
Served as MS St Anselm. Renamed Stena Cambria in 1990. Various roles on English Channel and Irish Sea. With Baleària, served Barcelona – Ibiza, as Isla De Botafoc. The ship is currently operated by Ventouris ferries on route Bari-Durrës.

The vessel featured a bow rudder (like her sister St Christopher) for manoeuvrability in harbour. Passenger accommodation was later extended, with a lounge area added above the stern.

St Christopher
Most of her early career on the Irish Sea and the English Channel. Renamed Stena Antrim in 1990. Currently with Comanav as Ibn Batouta, operating between Algeciras – Tánger.

The vessel featured a bow rudder (like her sister St Anselm) for manoeuvrability in harbour. Passenger accommodation was later extended, with a lounge area added above the stern.
