= Comarit =

Moroccan ferry operator

- Founded: 1984
- Founder: Abdellali Abdelmoula
- Defunct: 2012
- Fate: Bankrupt
- Headquarters: Tangier, Morocco
- Area served: Strait of Gibraltar; Mediterranean Sea
- Services: Passenger transportation Freight transportation
- Website: www.comarit.es

Comarit (Compagnie Maritime Maroco-Norvegiènne) was a Moroccan ferry operator. Comarit operated a freight and passenger ferry service between Morocco and Spain, France and Italy from 1984 to 2012. It was based in Tangier, one of the main points of departure for its ferries. The company suspended operations in January 2012.

== History ==
Comarit was formed in 1984.

In June 2008, Ganger Rolf and Bonheur sold their 55% stake to their Moroccan partner for MAD 700 million (approximately NOK 490 million).

The company was liquidated in 2013.

== Fleet ==
=== Ferries ===
Ship	Year of construction	IMO	Year of acquisition and sale	Capacity	Status
Badis	1973	7224459	2007 (chartered)	1200	Scrapped in 2021 as Roger
Banasa	1975	7358755	1996 – 2015	1600	sold in 2015
Berkane	1976	7401215	2002 – 2015	1844	destroyed in 2015 at Aliağa
Biladi	1979	7824912	2002 - 2013	1750	destroyed in 2013 at Aliağa
Bismillah	1971	7104984	1984 - 2006	750	destroyed
Bissat	2000	9221169	2010 - 2013	647	in service under the name Detroit Jet
Boraq	2000	9216171	2010 - 2016	647	sold in 2016
Boughaz	1974	739601	1988 - 2015	1400	decommissioned in 2012 at Algeciras and then destroyed in 2015 at Aliağa
Eurovoyager	1978	7613882	2010 (chartered)	1200	destroyed in 2012 at Aliağa
Oleander	1980	7820497	2000 - 2012 (chartered)	1300	in service under the name Sherbatiskiy
Primrose	1975	7357567	2009 (chartered)	1475	destroyed in 2011 at Alang
Rostock	1981	8000226	2009 - 2010 (chartered)	1536	in service under the name Wasa Express
Sara I	1974	7360667	2003 - 2005 (chartered)	1500	destroyed in 2012

=== Cargo ships ===
Ship	Year of construction	IMO	Year of acquisition and selling	Capacity	Status
Baltic Eager	1979	7804065	2009 (chartered)	12	destroyed in 2013 at Mumbai
East Express	1984	8009040	2010 (chartered)	12	In service under the name Gazalle
Vomero	1973	7328360	1995 (chartered)	12	destroyed in 2004 at Aliağa

== Routes ==
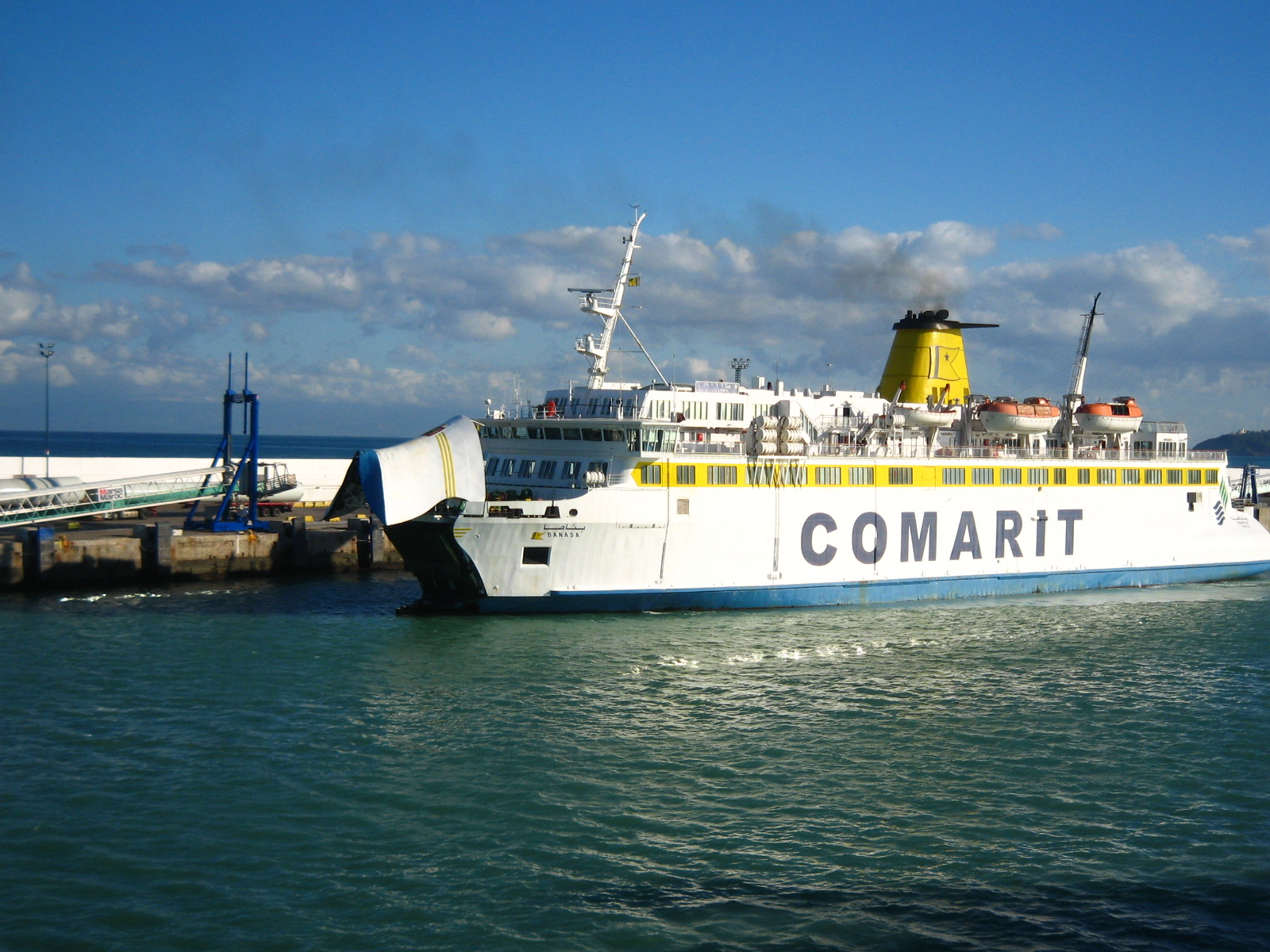
MS Banasa arriving at Tangier

Comarit operated five routes between Spain, France and Morocco.

- Algeciras - Tangier
- Genoa - Tangier
- Sète - Tangier
- Tarifa - Tangier
- Nador - Almería
