= Morocco Express 1 =

High-speed catamaran built by Austal

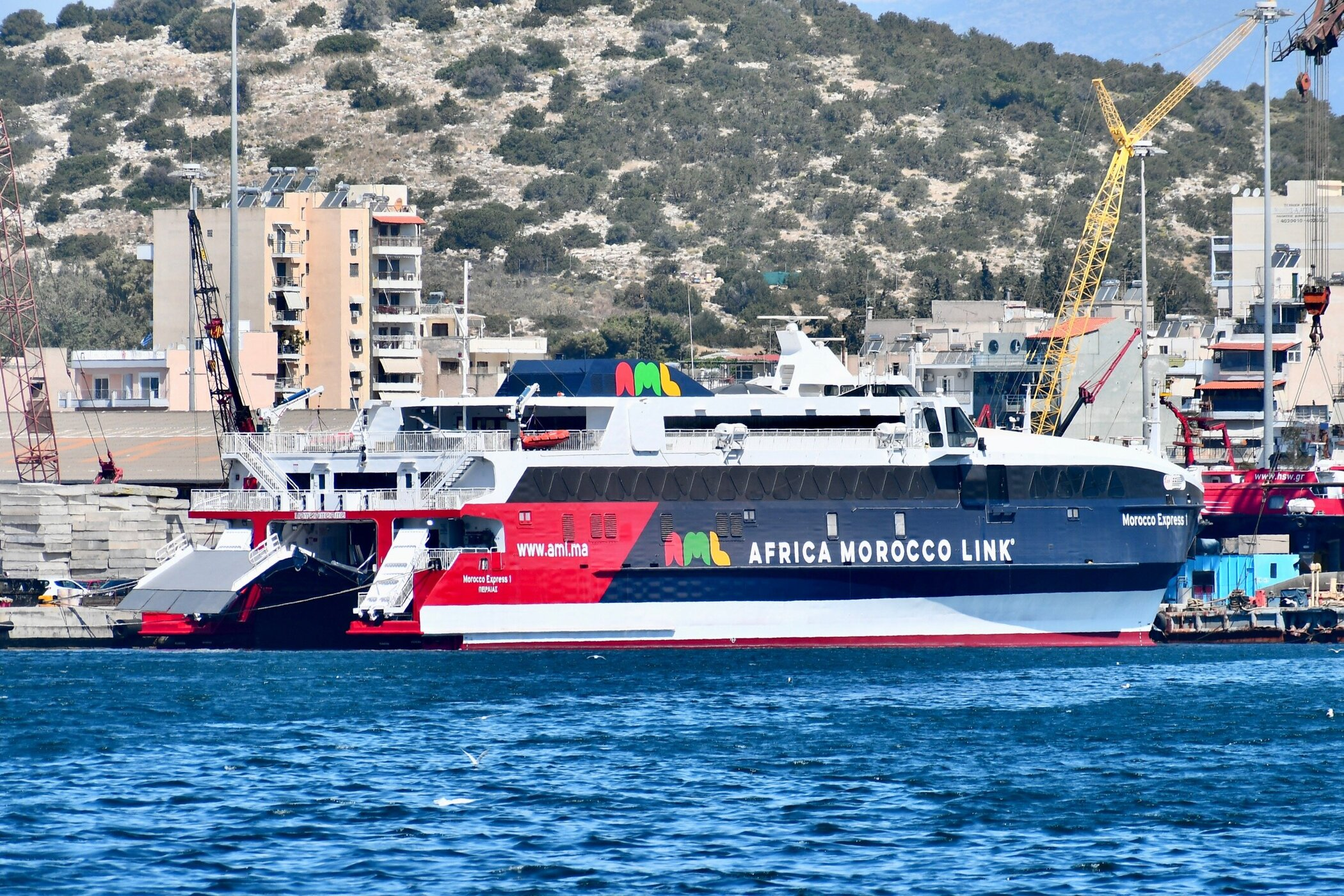
- Morocco Express 1 in Perama

History
- Name: (2000–2010): Highspeed 3; (2010–2023): Boraq; (2023–2024): Highspeed 3; (2024-present): Morocco Express 1
- Owner: (2000–2010): Minoan Flying Dolphins/Hellenic Seaways; (2010–2014): Comarit; (2014–2017): [Unknown]; (2017–2023): Inter Shipping Sarl; (2023–2024): Hellenic Seaways Maritime SA; (2024–present): Africa Morocco Link / Stena Line
- Operator: (2000–2001): Minoan Flying Dolphins; (2001–2005): Hellas Flying Dolphins; (2005–2010): Hellenic Seaways; (2010–2014): Comarit; (2017–2023): Inter Shipping; (2024–present): Africa Morocco Link
- Port of registry: (2000–2010): Piraeus, Greece; (2010–2024): Tanger, Morocco; (2024): Piraeus, Greece; (2024–present): Limassol, Cyprus
- Route: Tarifa – Tanger Ville
- Ordered: 1999
- Builder: Austal Ships; Henderson, Australia
- Yard number: 87
- Launched: 2000
- Completed: May 2000
- Acquired: 2024
- Maiden voyage: 2000
- In service: 2000
- Identification: IMO number: 9216171; Call sign: 5BNC6; MMSI number: 210836000
- Status: In service

General characteristics
- Class & type: Austal Auto Express 72
- Tonnage: 2,377 GT; 190 DWT
- Length: 72.00 m (236 ft 3 in)
- Beam: 17.50 m (57 ft 5 in)
- Draft: 2.50 m (8 ft 2 in)
- Depth: 5.90 m (19 ft 4 in)
- Decks: 2
- Ramps: Stern passenger and vehicle loading ramps
- Installed power: 4 × MTU 16V 595 TE70 diesel engines (total 15,480 kW / 20,760 hp)
- Propulsion: 4 × Kamewa waterjets
- Speed: 34.0 knots (63.0 km/h; 39.1 mph) (service) 40.0 knots (74.1 km/h; 46.0 mph) (max)
- Capacity: 647 passengers; 70 cars
- Crew: 24
- Notes: Sister ship to Detroit Jet

Morocco Express 1 is a 72-metre high-speed vehicle and passenger catamaran ferry built in 2000 by Austal Ships in Australia as part of their Auto Express 72 series. Originally delivered to Minoan Flying Dolphins (later Hellenic Seaways) as Highspeed 3, she spent more than two decades operating fast ferry services across the Cyclades and Aegean Sea in Greece. In 2024, following Attica Group's sale of Africa Morocco Link to Stena Line, the vessel was transferred to AML and renamed Morocco Express 1 to operate on the Strait of Gibraltar route connecting Tarifa and Tangier Ville.

== Service ==
The catamaran, the second of a series of two sister units, was launched on 20 May 2000 at the Austal specialist shipyard in Fremantle with the name Highspeed 3 and delivered on 1 July to the Greek company Minoan Flying Dolphins, for which it entered service at the end of the month on the routes between Rafina and the islands of Tinos and Mykonos, in the Cyclades. In January 2005 it was then transferred to the newly formed Hellenic Seaways.

In February 2010, in view of the purchase of the Milenium, destined to become Highspeed 6, the catamaran was sold to the Moroccan company Comarit, to whom it was delivered in mid-April, after having finished its service for the Greek company on 12 April. Following this, the catamaran, renamed Boraq by the new owner, set sail on 18 April from Piraeus to Tarifa, finally entering service in May on the connections between the Andalusian city and Tangier. However, just two years later, in May 2012, due to the economic difficulties of the company, the catamaran was laid up in Tarifa, where it remained until the effective bankruptcy of the Moroccan company, which occurred in July 2014, when it was transferred to Tangier.

On 7 April 2016, after approximately two years of mooring in Morocco, the catamaran was sold at auction for approximately 3 million euros to the Moroccan company Inter Shipping, which had the intention of renovating the fast vessel in the Cernaval shipyard in Algeciras and introducing it on the routes between Gibraltar, Tangier Med and Tarifa under the name Jet Gibraltar. However, the project never saw the light of day and the catamaran remained abandoned again for another nine years, until 27 June 2023, when, following the bankruptcy of the Moroccan company, it was sold again at auction for approximately 2.41 million euros to the Greek company Hellenic Seaways, already the owner of the unit when it was built. Following this, on 8 October 2023, the catamaran, in the meantime renamed Highspeed 3, sailed under tow of the Greek tug Christos XXIV to the Perama shipyards, where it underwent major refitting works, at the end of which, in April 2024, it was renamed Morocco Express 1 and chartered to Africa Morocco Link, for which it finally entered service on 4 June 2024 on the routes between Tarifa and Tangier as a replacement for Caldera Vista.
