= MS Kronprins Frederik =

Passenger and Freight Ferry

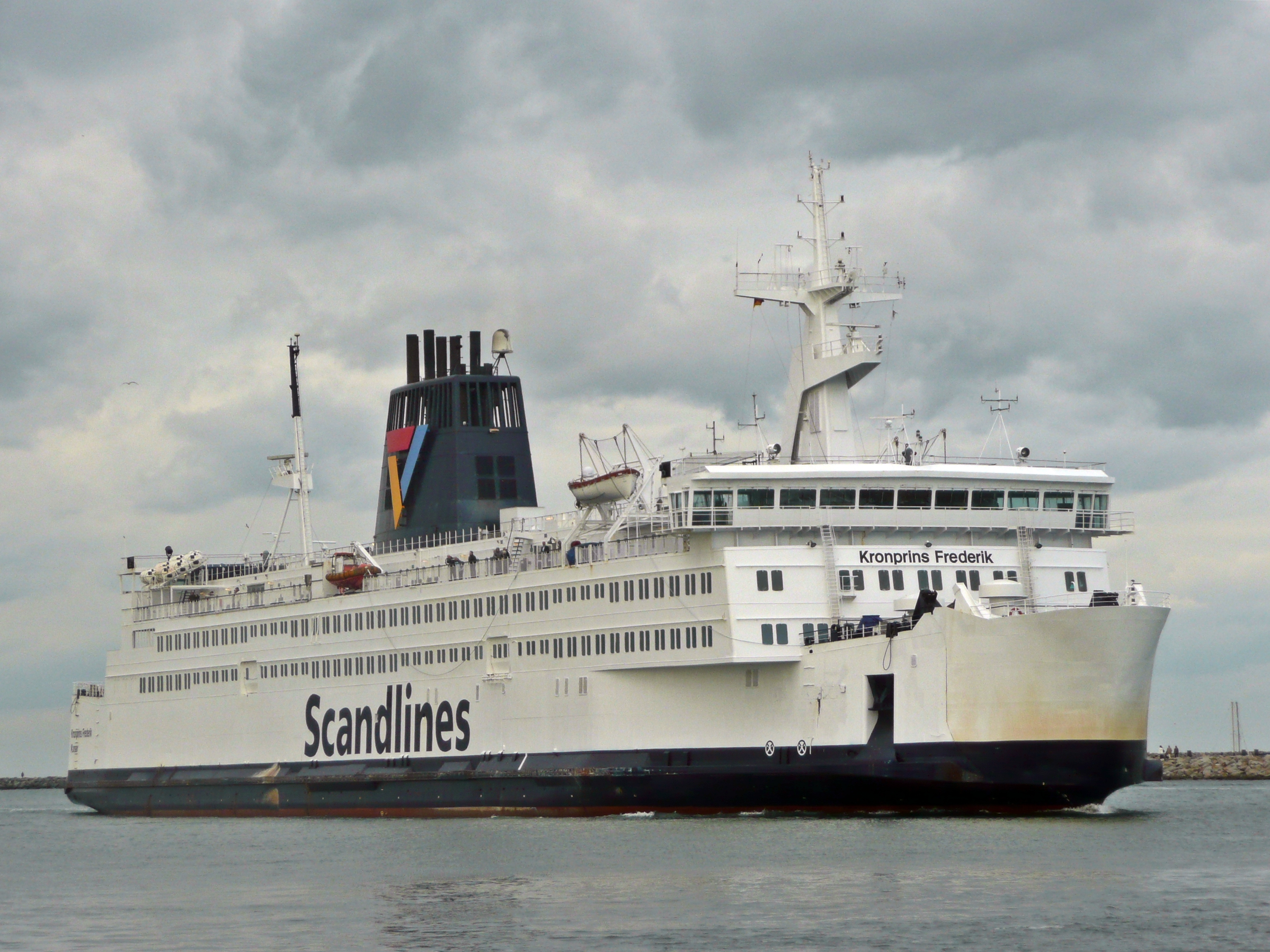
- Kronprins Frederik

History
- Name: 1981 onwards: Kronprins Frederik
- Operator: 1981-1997: DSB; 1997-2026: Scandlines
- Port of registry: 1981-2017: Korsør, Denmark; 2017-2026: Rostock, Germany
- Route: Puttgarden - Rodby
- Builder: Nakskov Skibsværft, Nakskov, Denmark
- Yard number: 224
- Laid down: 21 November 1979
- Launched: 2 July 1980
- Acquired: 2 April 1981
- In service: April 1981
- Out of service: July 2026
- Identification: IMO number: 7803205
- Status: Scrapped in 2026

General characteristics (after 1997 rebuild)
- Tonnage: 16,071 GT
- Length: 152.00 m (498 ft 8 in)
- Beam: 23.70 m (77 ft 9 in)
- Draught: 5.10 m (16 ft 9 in)
- Installed power: 4 × MAK 8M32C diesels; 2 × MAK 6M32 diesels
- Propulsion: 2 × controllable pitch propellers; 2 × Bow thrusters
- Speed: 18.5 knots (34.3 km/h; 21.3 mph)
- Capacity: 1,000 passengers; 225 cars

MS Kronprins Frederik was a freight ferry that operated between Germany and Denmark.

== History ==
The Kronprins Frederik was built in 1980 at the Nakskov Skibsværft in Nakskov. She entered service in April 1981 operating on the Nyborg - Korsør route.

Following the opening of the Great Belt Fixed Link in June 1997. The Kronprins Frederik and her sisters were laid up. In December 1997 the Kronprins Frederik was rebuilt and entered service on the Gedser - Rostock route. Since commissioning the two new ferries in 2017, she has been used as a freight ferry on the Puttgarden - Rødby route. The ship was therefore rebuilt in Poland.

After a career of 45 years the Kronprins Frederik was sold in 2026 for recycling at Smedegaarden A/S in Esbjerg, Denmark. On 25 July 2026 she left Puttgarden for the last time, and arrived on 27 July 2026 in Esbjerg.

== Sisterships ==
The Kronprins Frederik was the third of three identical ships built for DSB. The other ships are the Dronning Ingrid and the Prins Joachim.

Name	Built	Tonnage	Passengers	Notes	Images
Dronning Ingrid	1980	16.071	458 Patients	MV Africa Mercy	
Prins Joachim.	1980	16.071	1400	MV Morocco Star	
Kronprins Frederik	1981	16.071	1400	Original DSB livery	
