= Morocco Sun =

Ship built in 1980

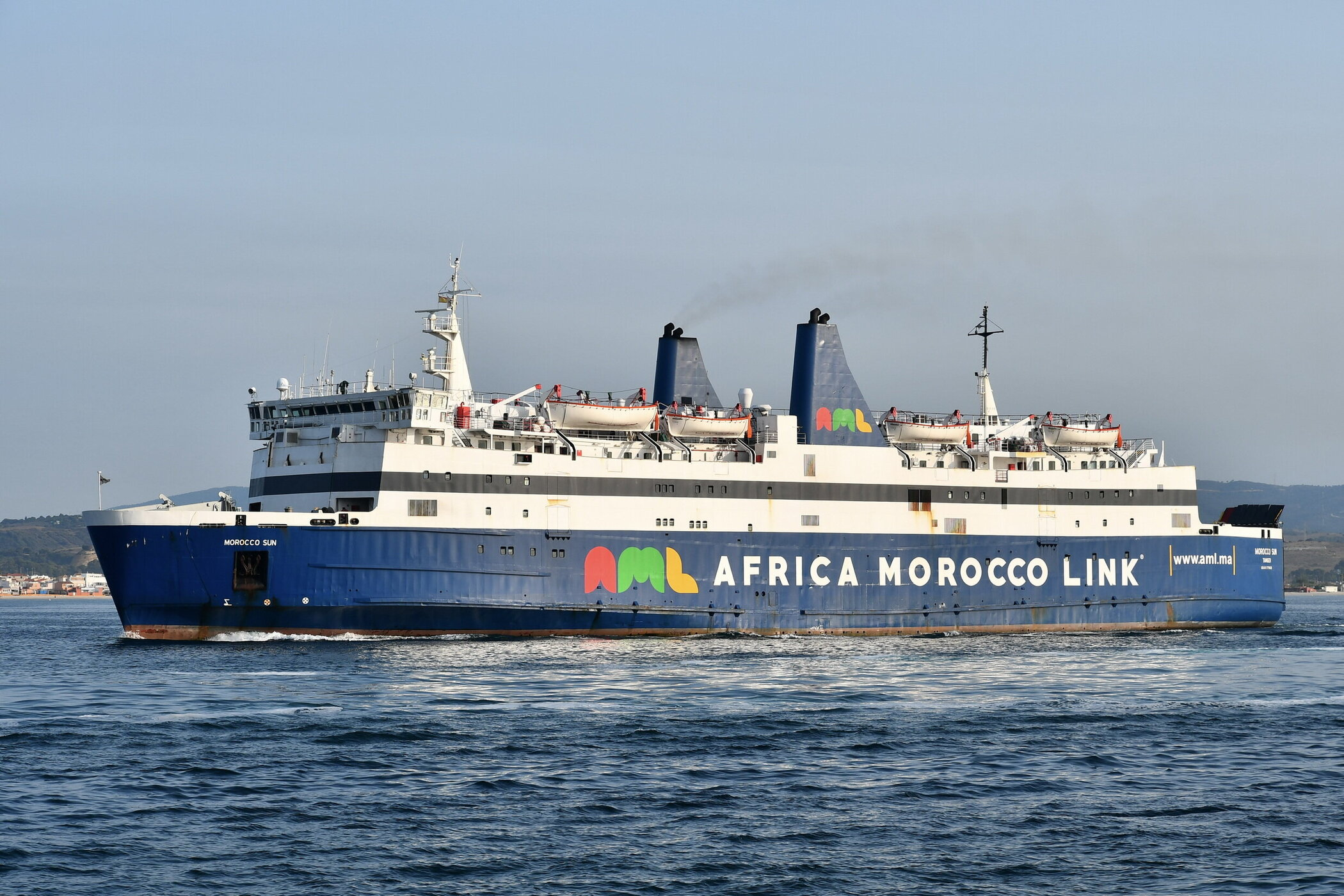
- Morocco Sun in Algeciras in June 2023

History
- Name: 1980–1990: Galloway Princess; 1990–2002: Stena Galloway; 2002–2019: Le Rif; 2019–present: Morocco Sun
- Owner: 1980–1984: Sealink; 1984–1990: Sea Containers; 1990–2002: Stena Line; 2002–2016: IMTC; 2016–2024: Detroit World Logistic Maritime; 2024–present: SL Shipping Morocco SARL
- Operator: 1980–1990: Sealink; 1990–2002: Stena Line; 2002–2013: IMTC; 2019–2025: Africa Morocco Link
- Port of registry: 1980–2002: Belfast, United Kingdom; 2002–present: Tangier / Casablanca, Morocco
- Route: Algeciras – Tanger Med; Former: Larne – Cairnryan / Stranraer
- Ordered: 1977
- Builder: Harland & Wolff; Belfast, Northern Ireland
- Yard number: 1713
- Laid down: 1978
- Launched: 24 May 1979
- Completed: 22 April 1980
- Acquired: 2016 (DWLM auction purchase)
- Maiden voyage: May 1980
- In service: 1980
- Identification: IMO number: 7719430; Call sign: CNA2494; MMSI number: 242228000
- Status: Laid up

General characteristics
- Class & type: Custom Harland & Wolff Ro-Pax Ferry
- Tonnage: 12,175 GT; 1,850 DWT
- Length: 129.65 m (425 ft 4 in)
- Beam: 21.62 m (70 ft 11 in)
- Draught: 4.72 m (15 ft 6 in)
- Decks: 8
- Ramps: Bow visor, bow and stern loading ramps
- Installed power: 2 × Crossley-SEMT Pielstick 16PC2-2V diesel engines (total 11,930 kW / 16,000 hp)
- Propulsion: 2 × controllable pitch propellers
- Speed: 19.0 knots (35.2 km/h; 21.9 mph) (service)
- Capacity: 1,001 passengers (30 cabins); 280 vehicles / 620 lane metres for freight
- Crew: 40–50

Morocco Sun is a 129.65-metre Ro-Pax passenger and vehicle ferry owned and operated by Africa Morocco Link. Built in 1980 by Harland & Wolff in Belfast, Northern Ireland, as the Galloway Princess for Sealink, she had a long history in Northern Europe (notably as Stena Galaica) and in the Mediterranean (as Le Rif) before being acquired, refurbished, and renamed Morocco Sun in 2019. Powered by two Crossley-SEMT Pielstick diesel engines, she operates key cross-Strait connections between Algeciras and Tanger Med.

== History ==
The Galloway Princess was built in 1979 by Harland & Wolff, Belfast for Sealink. She was built specifically to serve on the Larne to Stranraer route. She measured 12,175 Gross Register Tons, and fitted with two SEMT Pielstick 16PC2V diesel engines could achieve a speed of 19 knots. She could carry 1,000 passengers and 280 cars. She was employed on the Larne to Stranraer service from 1 May 1980.

In July 1984 she was registered to Sea Containers. In January 1990 she was sold to Stena Line and, renamed Stena Galloway, continued to operate on the same route under the Sealink Stena Line banner.

From 1 to 21 August 1992 it operated on the routes between Holyhead and Dún Laoghaire. On 12 November 1995 it was transferred to the Stranraer to Belfast services.

From September to 31 October 2001 it operated the services between Fishguard and Rosslare. On 22 February 2002 it was sold to the Moroccan IMCT and, renamed Le Rif, it sailed two days later for Tangier Med. In March 2003 it began service on the connections between Algeciras and Tangier Med.

On 22 April 2008, during a stopover in Algeciras, a fire broke out on board the ferry, which was quickly put out by the crew. In 2014, due to the financial problems of the shipping company, it was disarmed in Ksar es Seghir, near Tangier.

On 21 July 2016 it was sold at auction by the Moroccan authorities to Detroit World Logistics Maritime and sailed under tow to Málaga, where it underwent refitting works. In January 2017 it was transferred to the towing yard in La Spezia. In March it was transferred to Naples.

On 4 June 2019 it was chartered to Africa Morocco Link and, renamed Morocco Sun, was transferred to Genoa, where it underwent the necessary works for its return to service. On 24 July it left Genoa for Tangier Med, where it arrived three days later, and on 2 August it returned to service on the connections between the Moroccan port and Algeciras.

On 12 September 2019, it sailed from Tanger Med to the Palumbo shipyards in Valletta, where it underwent routine maintenance work. On 15 October, it sailed to Perama, where it underwent further work. Once the work was completed, on 9 October 2020, it sailed from Chalkida to Algeciras and on 20 October, it returned to service in the Strait of Gibraltar.

On 11 September 2025, at the end of the charter, after approximately six years of service on the connections between the two sides of the Strait of Gibraltar, the ferry was taken out of service and decommissioned in Tangier, returning to the hands of the owner company.

== Sister ships ==
- European Star
- Bari
- Port Link
