= MV Global Mercy =

Humanitarian Hospital Ship

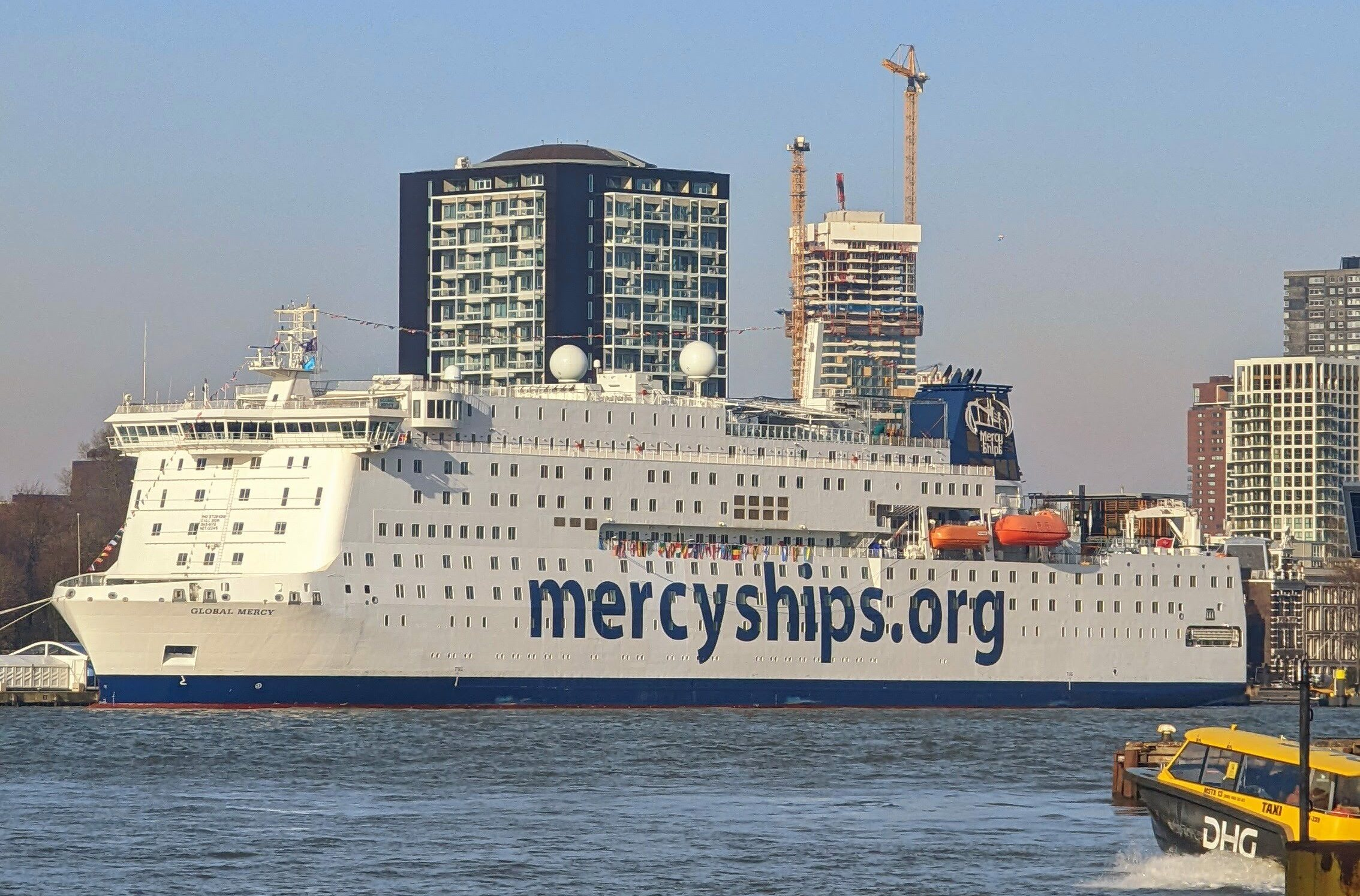

History
- Name: Global Mercy
- Owner: Mercy Ships
- Operator: Mercy Ships
- Port of registry: Malta
- Ordered: 2013
- Builder: Stena RoRo, Gothenburg, Sweden (contractor); China State Shipbuilding Corporation Tianjin Shipyard, China (construction)
- In service: 2023
- Identification: IMO number: 9726499
- Status: In service

General characteristics
- Type: Hospital ship
- Tonnage: 37,000 GT; 4,500 DWT
- Length: 174.0 m (570 ft 10 in)
- Beam: 28.6 m (93 ft 10 in)
- Draft: 6.15 m (20 ft 2 in)
- Decks: 12
- Installed power: 4 × Wärtsilä 6L32 diesels
- Propulsion: 2 × ABB Azipod CO propellers
- Speed: 12 knots (22 km/h; 14 mph)
- Capacity: 641

MV Global Mercy is the world's largest civilian hospital ship, constructed as the first purpose-built floating hospital for the religious humanitarian organization Mercy Ships.

== History ==
The contract to build the vessel was awarded to Stena RoRo of Gothenburg, Sweden, in 2014. Construction was done by China State Shipbuilding Corporation (CSSC) at the Tianjin Xingang Shipyard, Tianjin, China, and was completed in 2021.

The Global Mercy sailed to Antwerp, Belgium, in early 2021 for outfitting, and was delivered in June 2021. The Global Mercy increased the surgical capacity and patient beds of Mercy Ships and has an expected lifespan of 50 years. It is expected that more than 150,000 people will be able to get surgery on the Global Mercy throughout its lifespan.

In February 2022, the vessel sailed to Rotterdam, the Netherlands, for a two-week public relations stopover where it was unveiled to visitors for the first time. In May 2022 the ship sailed on its maiden voyage to Africa, where it joined the other vessel in the Mercy Ships fleet, the Africa Mercy, in Dakar, Senegal, to begin operating as a floating training center for the first time.

From February to June 2023, Global Mercy was docked in the Port of Dakar, Senegal for her first surgical field service. Welcoming patients from Senegal as well as the neighboring The Gambia, Mercy Ships served two nations from one port for the very first time. In the span of five months, nearly 800 surgeries took place on board. Approximately 600 healthcare professionals received training during this time.

In August 2023, the Global Mercy arrived in Freetown, Sierra Leone for its next field service, where a crew of volunteer professionals performed more than 1,900 surgeries over the course of 10 months. More than 170 healthcare professionals across the surgical ecosystem received training. After a period of maintenance, the hospital ship returned to Sierra Leone in August 2024 to begin another 10-month field service.

As of January 2026, Global Mercy is moored in the Port of Freetown, until June 2026.

== Mission ==
The Global Mercy was designed to greatly increase Mercy Ships' annual medical capacity and perform a range of surgeries, including maxillofacial/head and neck and reconstructive surgeries, tumor removals, cleft lip and palate repair, reconstructive plastics, orthopedic surgery, cataract removal, obstetric fistula repair, and more. Mercy Ships provides these surgeries free of charge to patients in their host nations over the course of each 10-month field service. During each field service, Mercy Ships partners with the local government and healthcare leaders to provide specialized training courses, mentor local medical professionals, and strengthen the country's healthcare system.

Global Mercy joins the organization's other operating ship, the Africa Mercy.

== Design and capabilities ==
The Global Mercy is the world's largest civilian hospital ship.

The 174-meter (570 ft 10 in), 37,000-ton ship features 12 decks. The hospital, located on decks 3 and 4, contains supply services, six operating theaters, seven ICU beds, 102 acute care beds, and 90 self-care beds. The hospital also features dedicated classroom spaces and simulator labs with state-of-the-art technology for enhanced training of local medical professionals. In addition to its hospital facilities, the Global Mercy provides accommodation for 641 people, and features a K–12 academy for the children of the crew.
