= MV Africa Mercy =

Humanitarian hospital ship

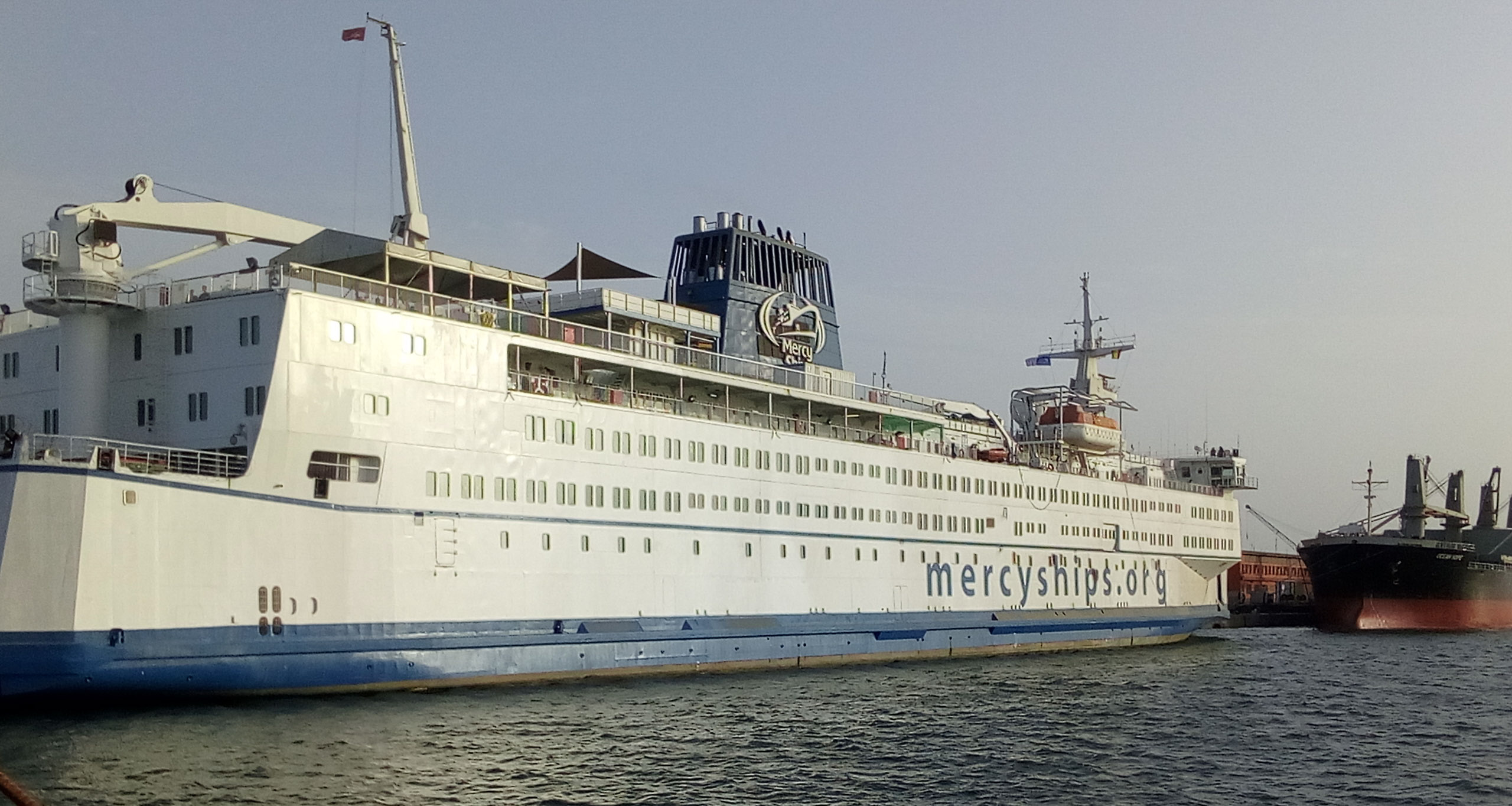
- The hospital ship Africa Mercy during a mission to Conakry

History
- Name: 1980–1999: Dronning Ingrid; 1999–2000: Ingrid; 2000–present: Africa Mercy
- Operator: 1980–1997: DSB; 1997–1999: Scandlines; 1999–present: Mercy Ships
- Port of registry: 1980–1999: Korsør, Denmark; 1999–present: Valletta, Malta
- Builder: Helsingørs Værft AS, Helsingør, Denmark
- Launched: 8 August 1979
- Maiden voyage: Monrovia, Liberia
- In service: 2007
- Identification: IMO number: 7803188
- Status: In service

General characteristics (after 1999 rebuild)
- Tonnage: 16,572 GT
- Length: 152.00 m (498 ft 8 in)
- Beam: 23.70 m (77 ft 9 in)
- Draught: 6.00 m (19 ft 8 in)
- Installed power: 4 × B & W diesels
- Propulsion: 2 × controllable pitch propellers
- Speed: 18.5 knots (34.3 km/h; 21.3 mph)
- Capacity: 484
- Crew: 450

MV Africa Mercy is a 152 m (498 ft 8 in), 16,572 GT hospital ship belonging to the humanitarian organization Mercy Ships. Converted from the rail ferry MS Dronning Ingrid in 2007, she is currently the world's second largest non-governmental floating hospital, following the organization's newest and largest ship, the MV Global Mercy.

== Design and capabilities ==
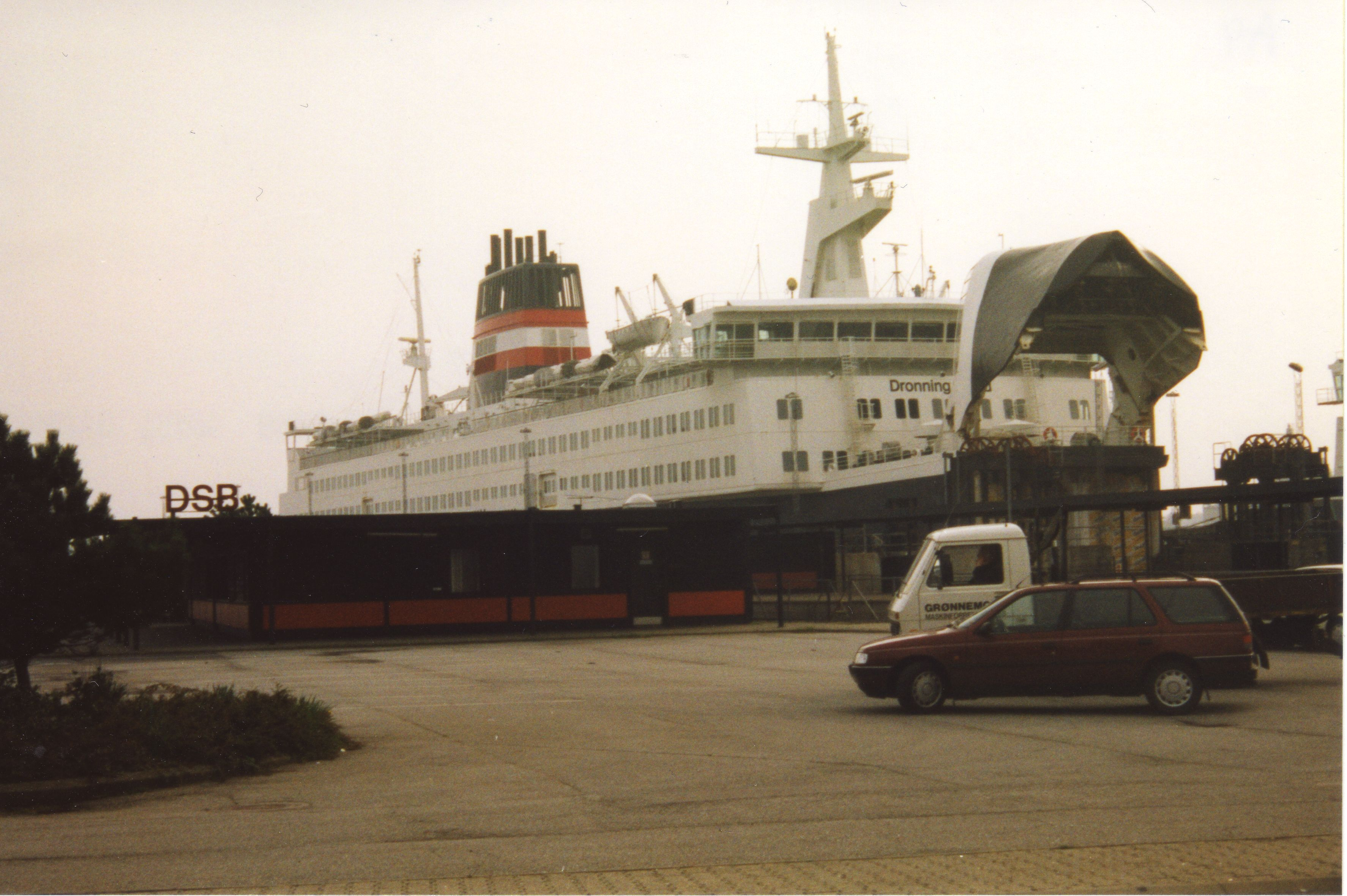
Dronning Ingrid in 1998

The Africa Mercy project started in March 1999. A former rail ferry named Dronning Ingrid (Queen Ingrid) was bought in Denmark for US$6.5 million, through a donation from U.K. businesswoman Ann Gloag's Balcraig Foundation. Dronning Ingrid is the first of three identical ships built for DSB (Danish State Railways). The other ships are the Kronprins Frederik and the Prins Joachim.

The ship was fitted out at the Cammell Laird shipyard at Hebburn in Tyneside, England. The ferry's large train deck facilitated its conversion into a hospital ship. Over the next few years, at a final cost of over US$62 million, the Dronning Ingrid was transformed into the Africa Mercy, which was the largest non-governmental hospital ship in the world until the construction of the Global Mercy in 2020. Although Mercy Ships has now retired all its earlier ships, the Africa Mercy has greater capacity than all three of its previous ships combined.

=== Facilities ===
The lower decks of the eight-deck Africa Mercy are a modern hospital with five operating theaters, an Intensive Care Unit, an Ophthalmology unit, a CT scanner, x-ray, laboratories, and a recovery ward with beds for 82 patients. In addition to the ship's lab capabilities, ship physicians can consult with pathologists in the U.S. via satellite communications.

On its upper decks, the ship has accommodations for 484 crew members including families, couples and individuals. The ship has 126 cabins, a day care center, a school for all ages up through the last year of high school, a library, a launderette, a small supermarket, a restaurant, a gymnasium, shops, and a donated Starbucks café. A fleet of 28 vehicles travels with the ship, for use in Mercy Ships land-based operations.

The initial provisions that were loaded aboard the Africa Mercy included 3992 kg of breakfast cereal, 419 kg of coffee, and 26.8 tons of frozen meat and fish (which was an estimated four months' supply). Today, the supply chain for the Africa Mercy stretches halfway across the globe. To keep the Africa Mercy provisioned involves shipping to the floating hospital at least 24 12-metre (40 ft) containers per year, equipped with everything from medical devices and medical supplies to food and furniture. Containers are filled at Mercy Ships headquarters in Garden Valley, Texas, and shipped from the port of Houston, or they are filled and shipped from Rotterdam in the Netherlands. Temperature-sensitive supplies like vaccines and media plates are often transported via air, in rolling ice chests that travel with Mercy Ships staffers who are en route to the Africa Mercy.

=== Medical and surgical care ===
The ship is set up to provide onboard surgical care, an Intensive care unit, and a recovery ward. Land-based medical operations provide patient screenings for surgeries, health and dental care, mental health programs, and palliative care for terminally ill patients.

The operating rooms of the Africa Mercy are equipped for specific surgeries that are greatly needed in the countries that the ship visits. These surgeries can also be performed efficiently and repeatedly. Conditions treated onboard the ship include head and neck tumors, goiters, hernias, cleft lip and palate, cataracts, bowed legs (genu varum), club foot, burns and burn scars, childbirth injuries and the gangrene-like childhood disease called noma. Because medical care is so scarce in the countries that Mercy Ships serves, these medical conditions often become severe enough to be disfiguring, which means that patients are often shunned by their communities. The surgical correction of their medical problems assists patients in reintegrating with their communities and resuming normal lives.

On land, a screening clinic is set up to evaluate potential patients for surgeries, often in a large area like a sports arena. Volunteers set up medical and dental clinics to treat people in the surrounding communities. A HOPE Center established near the ship provides extended medical care to patients. In addition, volunteers train local healthcare workers in providing primary healthcare, and they teach workers to train others in providing healthcare.

=== Infrastructure projects ===
Beyond providing free surgical, medical, and dental care, the mission of Mercy Ships involves partnering with local governments in the nations they serve to improve local healthcare infrastructure. Developing medical facilities on land, donating medical equipment, and training local personnel are key ways through which Mercy Ships facilitates sustainable medical care that can continue long after their ships depart from their host countries.

Expanding medical capacity typically includes renovating healthcare facilities in developing nations, as well as improving access to safe, affordable healthcare. Mercy Ships development teams collaborate with local leaders, governments, and the national ministries of health to evaluate healthcare infrastructure needs and design projects that support the surgical ecosystem in a partner hospital, or multiple hospitals. Throughout its decades of operation, Mercy Ships has supported various medical projects such as the construction or renovation of hospital surgical wards, clinic facilities and equipment for service, new maternity units, and operating theatres.

The renovation of healthcare facilities is paired with medical professional mentoring and training courses, both on ship and in-country, designed to improve the quality of services across an entire hospital setting.

== Volunteer crew ==
Like past Mercy Ships vessels, the Africa Mercy is staffed by volunteer crewmembers. Mercy Ships volunteers assume responsibility for the costs of their trip to the Africa Mercy, which can include round-trip airfare and other travel costs, immunizations, passports, insurance, etc.

Approximately 400 people live and work onboard the Africa Mercy during its field service period. In addition to surgical and medical services, volunteers handle every task in the daily life of the ship, including crew operations, maintenance and repairs, cooking, housekeeping, teaching in the Preschool through 12th Grade Academy, and the Mercy Ships health education, training, and advocacy projects (ETA) that take place on ship and land. Volunteer postings for a wide range of jobs generally range from two weeks to two years in length. Some crewmembers extend their service commitments and live for many years on board the ship. Annually Mercy Ships has more than 1,600 volunteers serving on the Africa Mercy hailing from 40-60 nations at any given time. During each field service, approximately 260 local employees from the present host nation also serve as day workers on the ship and at the Hospital Outpatient Center (HOPE Center).

Volunteer crewmembers can also choose to serve as blood donors for the ship's surgical procedures. When they arrive at the ship, they may volunteer to have their blood types tested and recorded. They are paged when surgeries requiring their blood types are scheduled, and they donate blood immediately before the procedure.

== Field service history ==
In 2007, the ship made her official maiden voyage to Monrovia, Liberia, from the shipyard in England. The Africa Mercy remained in Liberia for her 2008 Field Service.

In 2009, the ship was docked in Cotonou, Benin, from February to December, providing free surgeries and medical care. Mercy Ships also worked with Beninese citizens on agriculture and water development projects.

Early in 2010, the ship was docked in Lomé, Togo, for the 2010 Field Service.

In August 2010, the Africa Mercy went into shipyard in South Africa, where it was equipped with new, more efficient generators.

The Africa Mercy served in Freetown, Sierra Leone for 10 months for her 2011 Field Service. At the conclusion of each Field Service, the Africa Mercy goes in to dry dock, where it is resupplied and receives any needed repairs or upgrades before heading to her next port of call. In December 2011/January 2012 the maintenance period was spent in Ghana.

Africa Mercy was operating in Lomé, Togo from January to June 2012, then in Conakry, Guinea from August 2012 to June 2013.

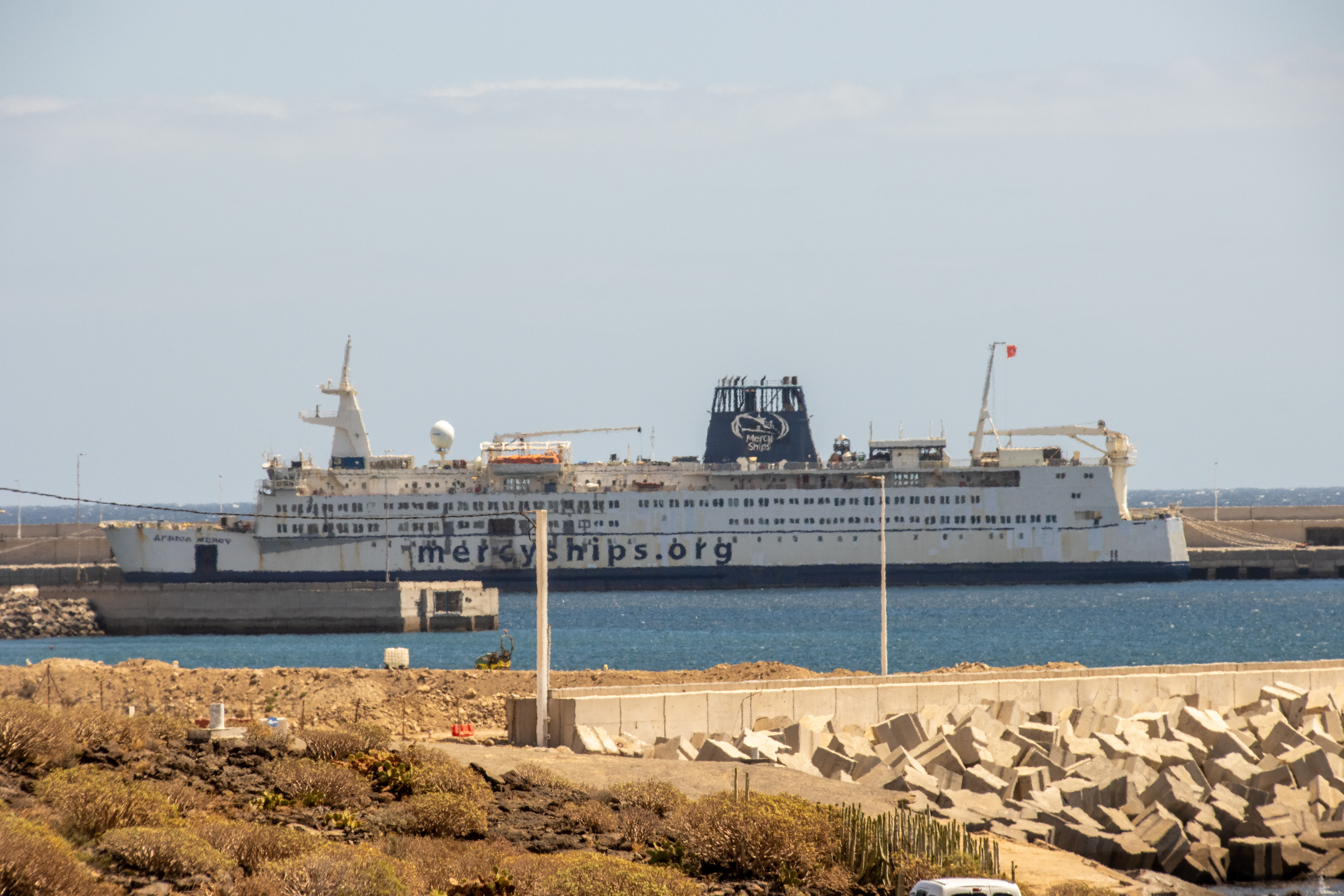
In Tenerife in March 2021

The Africa Mercy was docked in Pointe Noire, Republic of Congo, from August 2013 to June 2014.

The Africa Mercy was docked in Toamasina, Madagascar, from October 2014 until June 2015. The vessel returned to Madagascar in October 2015 was docked there until June 2016.

The Africa Mercy was in Cotonou, Benin from August 2016 through June 2017.

The Africa Mercy was docked in Douala, Cameroon, from August 2017 through June 2018.

The Africa Mercy was docked in Conakry, Guinea, from August 2018 through June 2019.

The Africa Mercy was docked in Dakar, Senegal, from August 2019 through March 2020.

In March 2021 it was docked in Port of Granadilla, Tenerife.

In February 2022, the Africa Mercy arrived in Dakar, Senegal for a scheduled 10-month field service.

In February 2024, following a year of refit and maintenance in South Africa, the Africa Mercy arrived in Toamasina, Madagascar, to begin her next field service.

In February 2025, after 6 weeks in Durban, South Africa, the Africa Mercy arrived for a second year of service in Toamasina, Madagascar, to begin her 10-month field service.

As of January 2026, Africa Mercy is moored in Madagascar.

== In pop culture ==
A 2014 documentary film and 2016 documentary TV series, both titled "The Surgery Ship", were created based on the real-life events filmed onboard the MV Africa Mercy. My Mercy Box is a Norwegian documentary series about eight-year-old Fride Tvedt, who lives aboard the hospital ship MS Africa Mercy.

== Sisterships ==
The Dronning Ingrid is the third of three identical ships built for DSB. The other ships are the Kronprins Frederik and the Prins Joachim.
