= Christian humanitarian aid =

International Christian charity

Christian humanitarian aid is work performed by Christian non-governmental organizations (NGOs) to alleviate the suffering of people around the world. Humanitarian aid occurs in areas where some churches donate financial resources.

== Origins ==
The modern concept of Christian humanitarian aid is based on teachings from the Bible. Charity and providing assistance to the poor are concepts established in the Old Testament. According to Exodus, part of one's tithe was devoted to the needy (orphans, widows, foreigners). In the New Testament, Jesus taught much about the subject of charity. In the Sermon on the Mount, he called for people to help not only friends but also enemies, as well as those rejected by society, such as people with disabilities. In the Parable of the Good Samaritan, he described the medical care paid by a Samaritan to a Jew (both peoples were enemies), as a model of love for his neighbor. Paul of Tarsus has also raised funds for the underprivileged.

Dating back as early as the Middle Ages, Catholic monasteries and monastic orders have a long tradition of providing charity, asylum, and assistance to the poor. Protestant churches established the Department of Deacons responsible for helping the poor. Missionary societies of the 18th and 19th centuries often offered humanitarian assistance in addition to their main activity of evangelism.

In the 19th century, the first Christian non-governmental organizations (NGOs) began emerging. YMCA, a Protestant NGO, was created in 1844 in London. Caritas, a Catholic NGO, was founded in Cologne in 1897. The entrepreneurial culture of Evangelical churches also led to their creation of multiple NGOs.

Like the humanitarian movement, Christian NGOs attracted more attention in the 1970s. Some Christian NGOs, such as those run by evangelical doctors providing medical assistance in impoverished countries, are recognized for their contributions to development.

== Features and benefits ==
A Christian humanitarian NGO has at least one of the following traits:

- Affiliation with a Christian religious organization
- Explicit references to a Christian religion in its statutes
- Financial support from a Christian religious organization
- Selection of its board of directors or teams based on Christian principles or religious affiliation
- Decision-making based on Christian religious principles

Affiliation with local Christian churches across the world often make it possible for Christian NGOs to work in countries or regions that are otherwise difficult for governmental or international organizations to access. The international network of many Christian religions allows their NGOs to gather significant funding and publicity to promote their humanitarian actions across the world.

== Humanitarian staff ==
In some Christian NGOs, the staff is not only Christian. However, common spiritual values are a common feature among Christian NGO employees and volunteers. According to Christian aid workers, their commitment is motivated by spiritual values of compassion and mercy. In some NGOs, such as Mercy Ships, all employees are volunteers and have to pay for accommodation and food, as well as work for free.

== Intervention policies ==
The majority of Christian NGOs help everyone, regardless of religion. With the growth of secularization in some countries, some Christian NGOs have downplayed their religious identity. In some NGOs this depends on the cultural context of the national antenna.

Contrary to certain clichés, many Evangelical NGOs do not mix humanitarian and evangelization. But on the other hand, some evangelical NGOs can not provide help without accompanying evangelization. The diversity of evangelical movements makes both scenarios possible. In some parts of the world, as on the African continent, local culture places a great deal of importance on spiritual things, which makes it difficult for some people to understand or accept the work of Humanitarian NGOs that do not display their religious identity.

== Results and budgets ==
In 2007, Christian NGOs comprised 57.4% of the NGOs affiliated with the United Nations.

According to a British study by Elizabeth Ferris, published in 2005 in the periodical International Review of the Red Cross, Christian NGOs have large budgets and provide considerable financial support worldwide. This same study gives the following figures:

- NGOs related to the World Council of Churches and those of the group of Caritas Internationalis spend over a billion dollars a year in aid and development.
- The Lutheran World Federation has a budget of $73 million for aid and development.
- According to a 1953 study, religious NGOs gave 90% of the assistance provided after World War II.
- According to William Headley of (Catholic Relief Services), 1/3 of the persons living with AIDS in the world are treated with the help of the Catholic Church.

According to sociologist Sébastien Fath, Evangelical churches and their respective NGOs develop an international humanitarian entrepreneurship that influences policy decisions. Therefore, they are unavoidable geopolitical players in the humanitarian field.

== International Catholic organizations ==
Among the most important International Catholic humanitarian NGOs, there are Caritas Internationalis and Emmaus International. See also Catholic charities.

== International Protestant organizations ==
At the level of international Protestant humanitarian NGO, there are church-related organizations such as Lutheran World Relief and United Methodist Committee on Relief. The largest NGO humanitarian Protestant international not directly attached to a church is the YMCA.

== International Evangelical organizations ==
In the 1940s, in the United States, neo-evangelicalism developed the importance of social justice and humanitarian actions in Evangelical churches. The majority of evangelical Christian humanitarian organizations were founded in the second half of the 20th century. Among those with the most partner countries, there was the foundation of World Vision International (1950), Samaritan's Purse (1970), Mercy Ships (1978), Prison Fellowship International (1979), International Justice Mission (1997).

== Controversies ==
Conflicts of collaboration have occurred between Catholic NGOs and non-confessional NGOs in the fight against AIDS, mainly because of different views on the use of condoms.

In Bangladesh, some Christian NGOs are criticized for their activity of evangelism. According to the sociologist Geoffrey Martin, there is no overall policy, but some employees of Christian NGOs distribute Bibles to the people they assist. Evangelical aid has been criticized by more traditional Christian NGOs because they have not separated evangelism and humanitarian aid, which could affect all Christian humanitarian NGOs.

It has been difficult for some Christian and Muslim NGOs to collaborate.

In 2007, an anonymous tip accused local World Vision International employees in Liberia of diverting food stocks and building materials for personal use. The NGO sent investigators to different partner cities in the country and estimated that 90% of its aid in the country had disappeared in fraud, while reports mentioned cities that did not even exist. Following this event, the organization set up a fraud reporting hotline.

== Critics ==
In 2003, Abby Stoddard criticized Christian NGOs for not respecting the principle of neutrality in the armed conflict in South Sudan, because of their support for the regional independence.

According to Tamsin Bradley, who performed a study in Rajasthan (India), faith and compassion occasionally result in members of Christian NGOs overlooking the actual needs of people they assist, as well as their long-term needs.

Some have criticized the actions of Mother Teresa as "an imperialist enterprise of the Catholic Church, against an Eastern population, in an oriental city" and a "cult of suffering" little concerned about hygiene.

== See also ==
- Humanitarian aid
