= Africa Morocco Link =

Ferry company

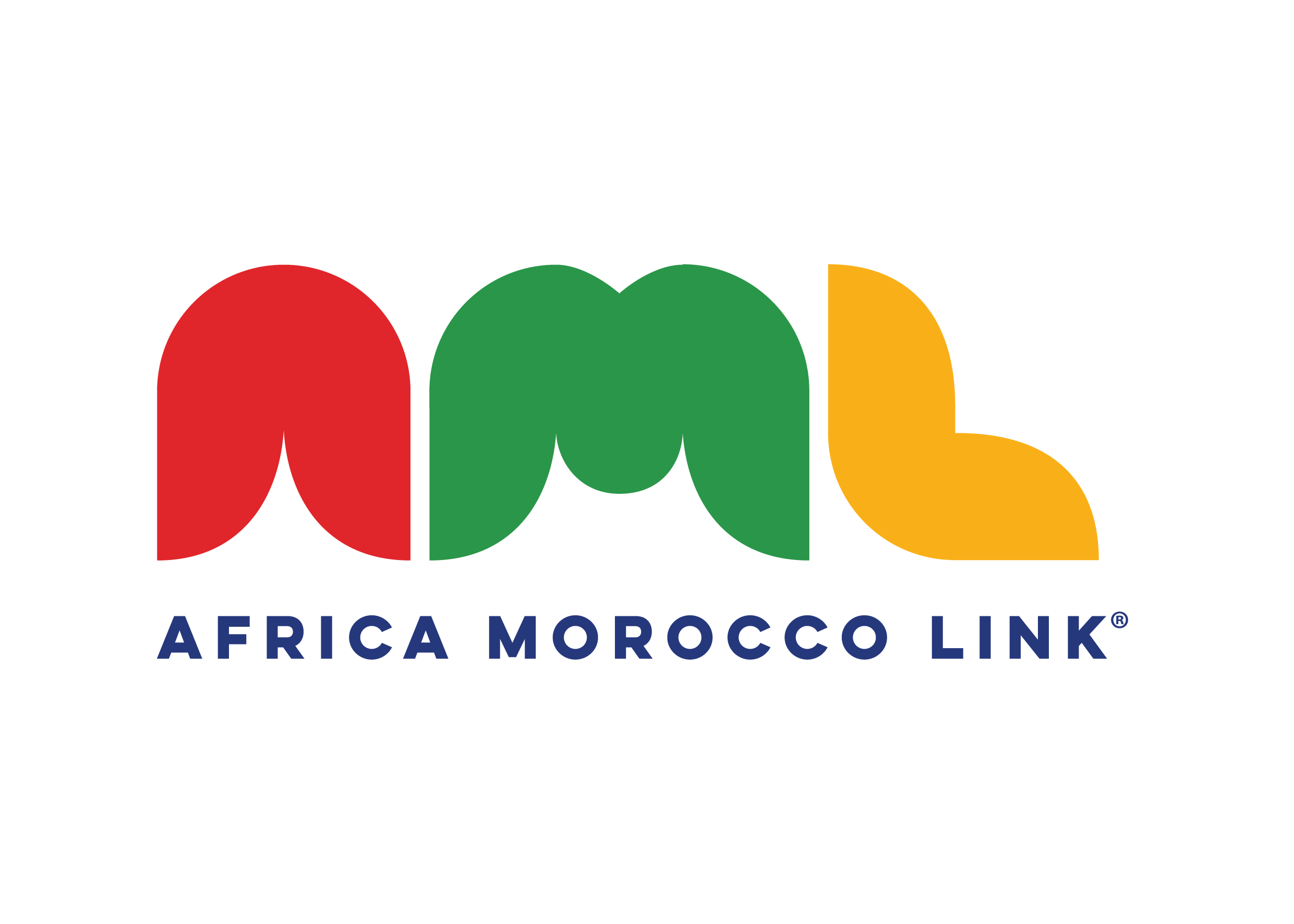
- Type: SARL
- Founded: 2016
- Headquarters: Tangier, Morocco
- Area served: Strait of Gibraltar
- Services: Passenger transportation & Freight transportation
- Owner: CTM (51%); Stena Line (49%)
- Website: https://www.aml-ferry.com/

Africa Morocco Link (AML) is a ferry company based in Morocco, founded in 2016. It operates maritime connections between Morocco and Spain, with regular crossings between the ports of Tanger Med and Algeciras, and between Tanger Ville and Tarifa.

== History ==
AML began operations on 17 June 2016 with the launch of the Tanger Med – Algeciras line. The inaugural departure took place from the port of Algeciras and was operated by the vessel Diagoras.

On 8 April 2024, the Swedish group Stena Line acquired the 49% stake held by Attica Group in AML.

On 4 June 2024, AML inaugurated a new route between Tangier Ville and Tarifa. The first departure took place at 9 a.m. from Tangier Ville and was operated by the vessel Morocco Express 1.

== Ownership ==
Initially, AML's capital was majority owned by the Bank of Africa and minority owned by Greek maritime operator Attica Group.

In 2024, Bank of Africa sold its 51% stake to CTM, both of which are part of the Moroccan holding company O Capital Group. A few days later, Attica Group sold its 49% stake to Swedish ferry operator Stena Line.

== Routes ==
- Tanger Med – Algeciras (launched on 17 June 2016)
- Tanger Ville – Tarifa (launched on 4 June 2024)
- Nador – Almería (15 October 2017 – 26 December 2017)

== Fleet ==
=== Current fleet ===
| Ship | IMO | Built | Entered service | Length | Passengers | Speed | Flag | Route | Notes |
|---|---|---|---|---|---|---|---|---|---|
| Morocco Star | 7803190 | 1980 | 2017 | 152.2 m | 935 | 22 kn | Morocco | Tanger Med – Algeciras | Formerly named Prince Joachim. |
| Morocco Sun | 7719430 | 1980 | 2019 | 129.65 m | 1,000 | 19 kn | Morocco | Tanger Med – Algeciras | Formerly Le Rif. |
| Stena Europe | 7901760 | 1981 | Summer 2024 | 174 m | 1,400 | 19 kn | Cyprus | Tanger Med – Algeciras | Chartered |
| Morocco Express 1 | 9216171 | 2000 | 31 May 2024 | 72 m | 680 | 34 kn | Cyprus | Tangier Ville – Tarifa | Formerly Boraq (Intershipping). Acquired via auction in 2023. |
| HSC Maria Dolores | 9333448 | 2006 | June 2024 | 68.4 m | 600 | 35 kn | Malta | Tangier Ville – Tarifa | Chartered to replace Caldera Vista. |

=== Former fleet ===
| Ship | IMO | Built | Entered service | Left fleet | Route | Notes |
|---|---|---|---|---|---|---|
| El Venizelos | 7907673 | 1984 | 2016 | 2016 | Tanger Med – Algeciras | Chartered for summer 2016 Marhaba campaign. |
| Aylah | 9097331 | 2009 | 2016 & 2017 | 2017 | Tanger Med – Algeciras | Chartered for summer operations. |
| Queen Nefertiti | 9130925 | 1997 | 2017 | 2017 | Tanger Med – Algeciras | Chartered for summer 2017. |
| Diagoras | 8916126 | 1990 | 2016 | 2017 | Tanger Med – Algeciras / Nador – Almería | Operated during the first year of AML. |
| Galaxy | 7516773 | 1979 | 2018 | 2018 | Tanger Med – Algeciras | Chartered for summer 2018. |
| Nissos Chios | 9215555 | 2007 | 2019 | 2019 | Tanger Med – Algeciras | Temporary replacement of Morocco Star. |
| Amman | 9079999 | 1995 | 2019 | 2019 | Tanger Med – Algeciras | Chartered for summer 2019. |
| Caldera Vista | 8900012 | 1991 | 2024 | 2024 | Tangier Ville – Tarifa | Withdrawn due to ramp incompatibility. |
| Hellenic Highspeed | 9141845 | 1997 | 2022, 2023 & 2024 | 2024 | Tanger Med – Algeciras | Chartered for three Marhaba seasons. |
