= Compagnie de Transports au Maroc =

Moroccan public transport company

CTM
- Company type: Public
- Traded as: CSE: CTM
- Industry: Transport, travel
- Founded: 1919; 107 years ago
- Headquarters: Casablanca, Morocco
- Area served: Morocco
- Services: Intercity bus service
- Owner: O Capital Group
- Website: www.ctm.ma

Compagnie de Transports au Maroc (CTM) is a Moroccan transport company. Established in November 1919, it is the oldest public transport company in Morocco.

== History ==
The idea for CTM originated during Sultan Abd al-Hafid's visit to France in August 1912, with General Hubert Lyautey personally supervising the trip. The Moroccan sultan spent time in the resort town of Vichy, where Jean Epinat owned a number or transport companies. On November 8, 1919, Sultan Abd al-Hafid passed a dahir sanctioning the establishment of the transportation company.

La Compagnie de Transports au Maroc was founded November 30, 1919 with the goal of accessing "all of Morocco." Its services ran along a new colonial road system planned with the aim of linking all major towns and cities.

At the beginning, the vehicles used by CTM were repurposed World War I military vehicles. Second class passengers rode on the roofs of these vehicles.

As a collaborator with the French colonial regime, Thami El Glaoui was a major shareholder in CTM.

The company began as a private company before being sold to the Moroccan government after regaining independence in 1956. In 1993, under the campaign of privatisation in Morocco, the company was floated on the Casablanca Stock Exchange.

== Corporate information ==
The company's president is Ezzoubaïr Errhaimini. In 2009, CTM's revenue totaled 406 million dirhams.

CTM's European partners include Eurolines Belgium (Epervier), Eurolines France S.A, Deutsch Touring, SITA, Sadem, Lazzi (Eurolines Italy), CLP, Julia (Eurolines Spain), Linebus and Alsa. Currently CTM serves over 100 domestic destinations and more than 80 international destinations in Spain, France, Belgium, Italy, Germany and the Netherlands.
