= Mercy Ships =

International non-governmental organization

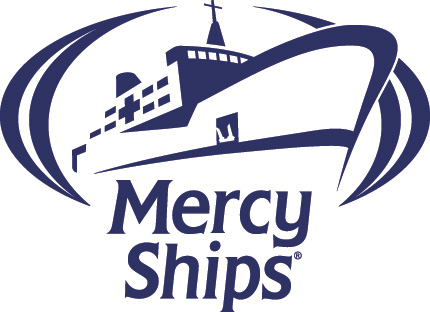
- Formation: 1978
- Founder: Donald and Deyon Stephens
- Type: Non-governmental organization
- Headquarters: Garden Valley, Texas, U.S. and Switzerland
- Region served: West, East, and Central Africa
- Services: Surgery, Healthcare, Development
- Chairman: Gary Brown
- Volunteers: c. 3,000 annually
- Website: www.mercyships.org

Mercy Ships is an international charity-based non-governmental organization that operates the largest non-governmental hospital ship service in the world, providing surgical care and surgical education in Africa, community development projects, community health education, mental health programs, agriculture projects, and palliative care for terminally ill patients. It has a headquarters in Garden Valley, Texas, and offices in sixteen countries around the world. Founded by Don Stephens in 1978, Mercy Ships has visited many countries, but focuses on Africa. As of 2026, the organization operates a two-ship fleet consisting of the Global Mercy and the Africa Mercy.

The organization's goal is to help those with complicated or catastrophic health problems, who are unable to afford the out-of-pocket fees of regular medical care. The organization carries out Christian evangelical activities with the goal of converting the residents of the countries it visits, but its "overarching aim" has been described (by Isabelle Lange) as using the good deeds it performs to spread Christianity.

== History ==
Mercy Ships was founded in 1978 by Don and Deyon Stephens in Lausanne, Switzerland, motivated by their Christian faith. It was founded in 1978 as the maritime division of Youth with a Mission (YWAM).

The first ocean liner acquired was the former Italian cruise ship Victoria, which was purchased in 1978 from a floating scrap yard in Greece for US$1 million (its scrap-metal value) and renamed Anastasis (the Greek word for "resurrection"). The ship's 350-member crew included Mercy Ships founders Don and Deyon Stephens, who lived on board the ship with their four young children for ten years starting in 1980. The ship was transformed into the hospital ship MV Anastasis and sailed to Africa in 1982. In 1983, the Anastasis began operations in the South Pacific, then moved to Central America and the Caribbean Sea in the mid-80s. The ship moved on to Africa in 1991 and remained in service there until 2007. The final port of call for the Anastasis was Monrovia, Liberia, as the Africa Mercy took over operations.

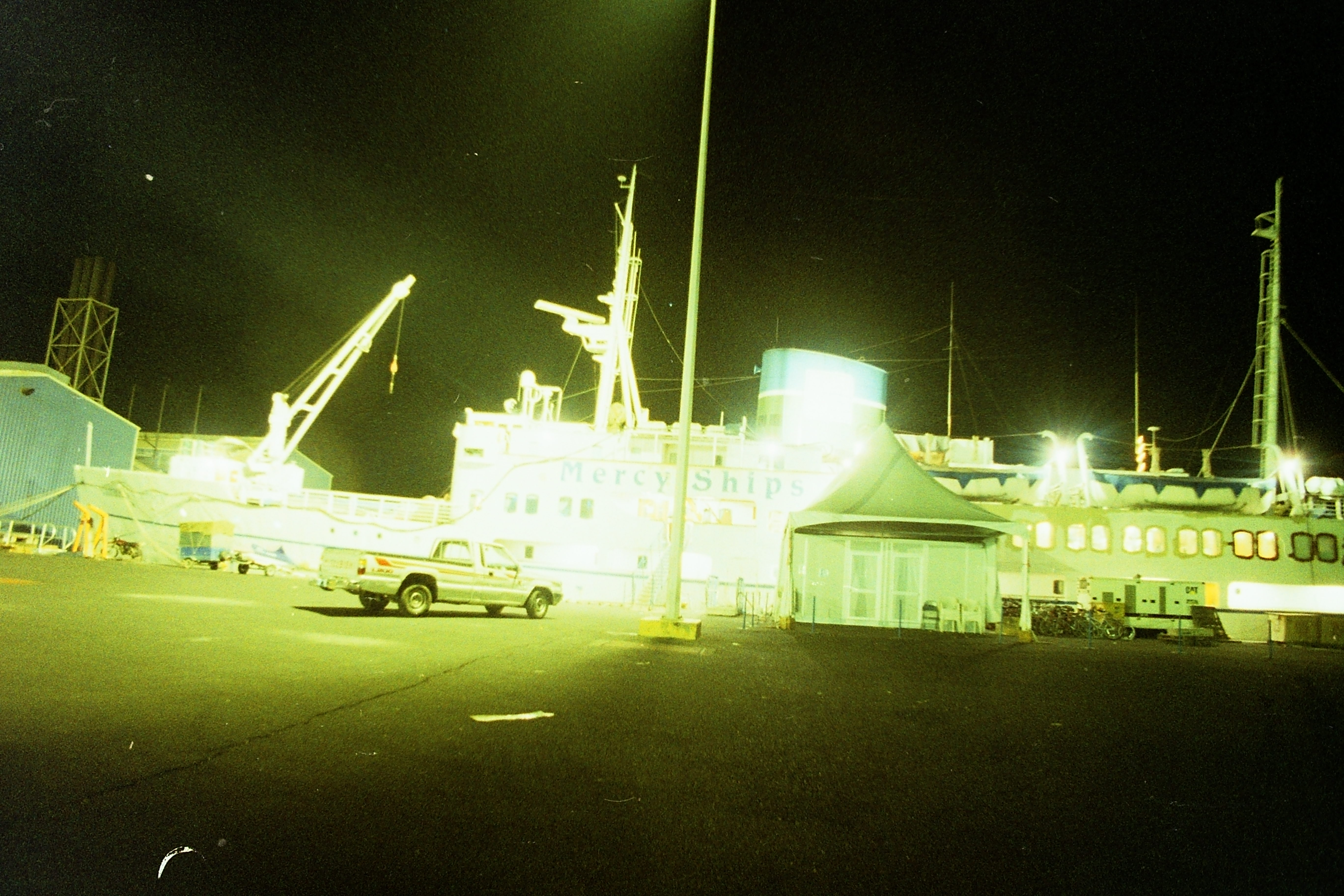
Caribbean Mercy — Deployed 1994, retired 2006

Mercy Ships purchased the Norwegian coastal ferry MS Polarlys in 1994 and transformed it into the MV Caribbean Mercy, a hospital ship that went to Central American and Caribbean ports. The ship offered berths for 150 crew. Over the course of several years, the ship was equipped with eye-surgery capabilities. On land, volunteers from the Caribbean Mercy also provided dental, orthopedic and healthcare services. The Caribbean Mercy visited 138 ports of call and remained in service until May 2005.

Originally, Mercy Ships was a part of the Youth with a Mission (YWAM) family of Christian ministries, before becoming a standalone organization in 2003. The organization historically used retired ocean liners and ferries that had been transformed into floating hospitals. In 2021, however, its first purpose-built hospital ship, the Global Mercy, joined the fleet.

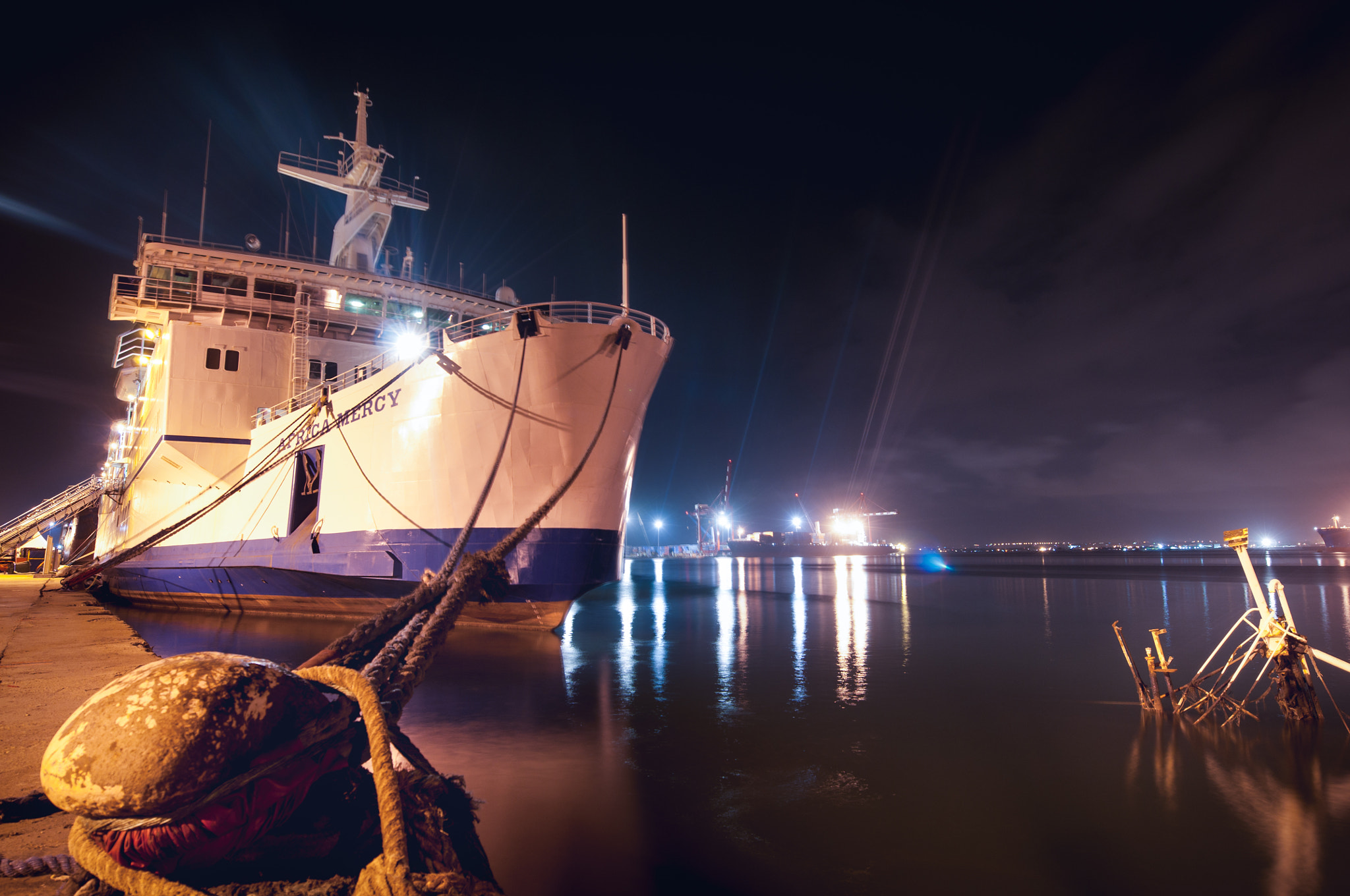
The hospital ship Africa Mercy during a mission to Pointe Noire, Congo, 2013

In 1983, the Canadian coastal ferry MV Petite Forte, formerly operated by CN Marine, was donated to Mercy Ships initially under the name MV Good Samaritan. From 1983 to 1994 it served in the Caribbean and Central and South America.The ship was renamed to the MV Island Mercy in 1994 and redeployed to the South Pacific. The vessel was 188 ft long, weighing 1,135 tonnes and had a capacity for approximately 98 passengers.It carried a crew of approximately 60 people and remained in service until 2001,when it was transferred to the Far East Maritime Foundation in the Philippines and operated as the training ship Far East I.The countries it served included Brazil, the Dominican Republic, Guyana and Haiti. The ship also reached beyond the Caribbean with relief and medical operations in Guinea-Bissau, Western Samoa, the Tokelau Islands and New Zealand.

In 1999 the organization began preparing a successor to the Anastasis by acquiring the almost 500 feet long Danish rail ferry Dronning Ingrid. The organization refitted the vessel into the 16,500-ton hospital ship Africa Mercy for US$62 million.

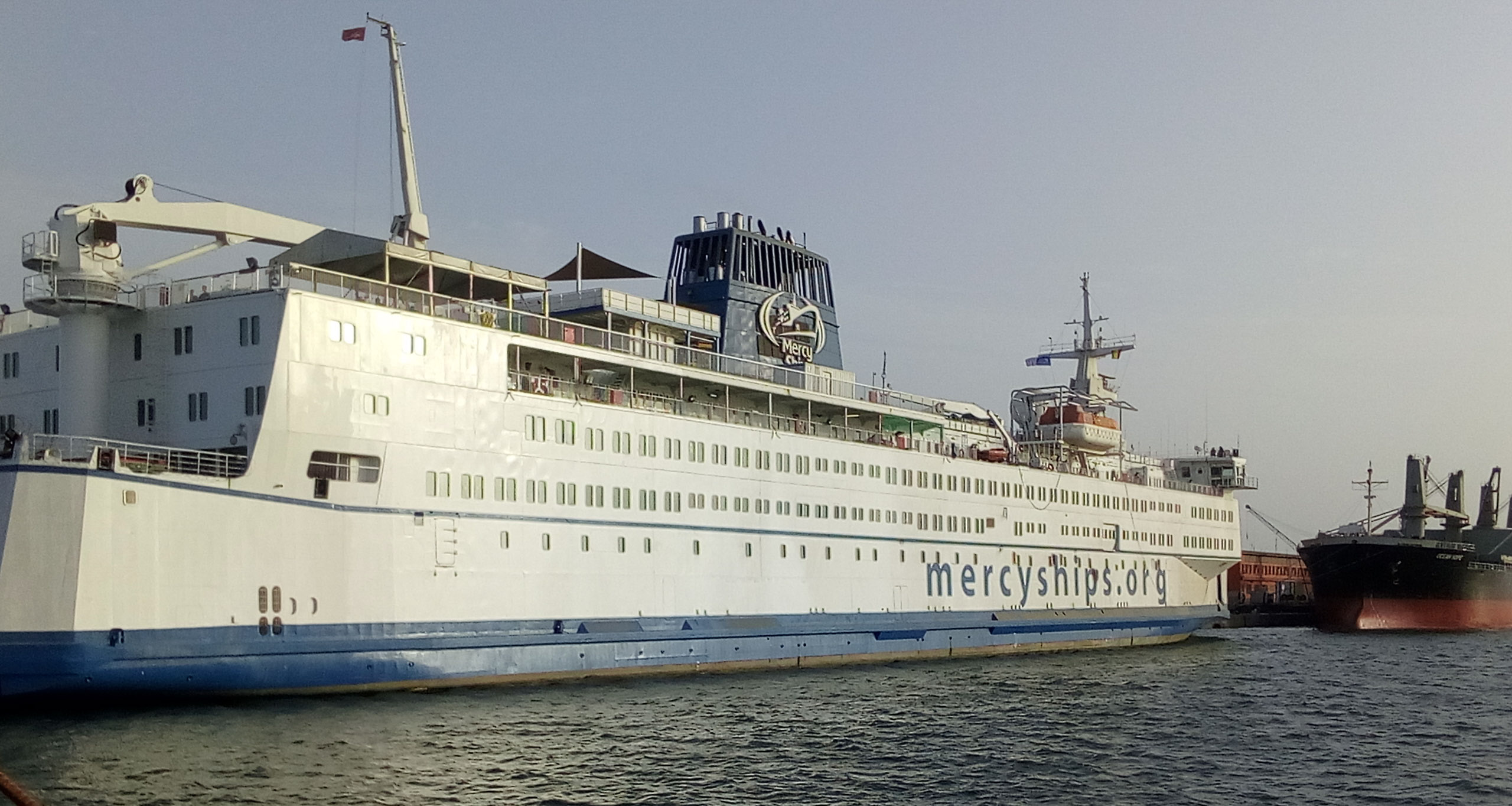
The hospital ship Africa Mercy while in Conakry, Guinea, in 2019

In 2007, the Africa Mercy made her official maiden voyage to Monrovia, Liberia, from the shipyard in England. In 2008, the Africa Mercy continued her service to Liberia, offering free surgeries, assistance in healthcare infrastructure development, and community-based preventive health care programs. More than 1,200 surgical procedures and 10,000 dental procedures were completed, along with community health projects such as HIV/AIDS prevention and construction of wells and latrines.

Early in 2010, the ship was docked in Lomé, Togo, for the 2010 field service. In August 2010, the Africa Mercy went into a shipyard in South Africa, where it was equipped with new, more efficient generators. In 2009, the ship was docked in Cotonou, Benin, from February to December, providing free surgeries and medical care. Mercy Ships also worked with Beninese citizens on agriculture and water development projects on the ground in Benin. Before the Africa Mercy arrives in port, flyers are distributed to alert the public to the ship's upcoming visit. According to Jonathan Eppley of the Big Rapids Pioneer, the ship must first get invited by "a developing nation with a stable government." Then the ship will dock and operate as a floating hospital generally for 8 to 10 months, then goes off to resupply and make ship repairs.

In 2019, the Africa Mercy docked in Dakar, Senegal, for a six-month field service. On February 1, 2022, the Africa Mercy returned to Dakar, Senegal, with the goal of providing surgery to approximately 950 patients whose surgeries were delayed due to the COVID-19 pandemic. In February 2024, following a period of extensive refit and maintenance in South Africa, the Africa Mercy arrived into the port of Toamasina, Madagascar, to begin her next field service. As of January 2026, Africa Mercy is moored in Madagascar.

The new ship, the MV Global Mercy, in partnership with Stena RoRo, finished construction and joined the fleet in June 2021. The Global Mercy is the organization's first purpose-built hospital ship and is the largest civilian hospital ship in the world, at 174 m (571 ft) long. In February 2023, the Global Mercy arrived in the Port of Dakar, Senegal, to begin her first surgical field service. In August 2023, the Global Mercy arrived in Freetown, Sierra Leone, for its next field service. After a period of maintenance, the hospital ship returned to Sierra Leone in August 2024 to begin another 10-month field service. Global Mercy is moored in Freetown until June 2026.

In 2024, Mercy Ships announced its plans to expand its fleet with a new, purpose-built vessel.

== Funding ==
Mercy Ships is an international charity-based non-governmental organization. As of 2026, the organization is funded by donations.

== Mission ==
Mercy Ships is a predominantly Christian interdenominational missionary organization, describing their mission as "bringing hope and healing to the forgotten poor, following the 2,000-year-old model of Jesus". The organization treats all patients free of charge without regard to their religion, race, or gender.

Mercy Ships is a Better Business Bureau accredited charity.

=== Madagascar ===
Mercy Ships has conducted multiple medical missions in Madagascar since 1996, providing free surgeries and healthcare training. Major field services in 2014-2016 and 2024-2025 focused on surgical care, medical capacity-building, and hospital partnerships. Working with the Malagasy government, Mercy Ships aimed to improve medical access and infrastructure.

As of January 2026, Africa Mercy is moored in Madagascar.

=== Sierra Leone ===
In December 2011, Mercy Ships signed on as a full partner to a Health Agreement with Sierra Leone, focusing on improving the country's principal hospitals. The agreement calls for Mercy Ships to focus on upgrading medical and surgical services, patient recordkeeping and the physical conditions of hospital buildings and infrastructure.

The organization's partner in Sierra Leone is the Aberdeen Women's Centre, formerly the Aberdeen West Africa Fistula Center. The Aberdeen Women's Centre is one of the few locations on the African continent offering obstetric fistula repair for women who have been injured during childbirth. Started by Mercy Ships with the Ministry of Health, Addax Foundation and other partners, the Fistula Centre is now operated by the Gloag Foundation.

As of January 2026, Global Mercy is moored in the Port of Freetown, until June 2026.

=== Benin and Ghana ===
Before it ceased operations, the Mercy Ship Anastasis docked in Cotonou, Benin and later Tema, Ghana providing medical care. In 2016 Benin reportedly had 1.5 physicians per 10,000 inhabitants, compared to 28 per 10,000 for the United Kingdom and 42 per 10,000 for Germany, according to the World Health Organization. Consequently, the country depends on foreign aid and nongovernmental organizations (ngos) such as Mercy Ships, for much of its health care services and health education.

=== Republic of Congo ===
The Mercy Ships 2013 field service in Pointe Noire marked the first visit by a Mercy Ship to the Republic of Congo. Mercy Ships partnered with the country's Ministry of Health, and programs addressed requests by the authorities in the Republic of Congo to support continuing education opportunities for practicing professionals. Those included mentoring and training in nursing, anesthesiology, infection control, cataract removal surgery, basic surgical skills, trauma care, newborn resuscitation, palliative care, midwifery, and community health education. Mercy Ships partnered with local hospital infrastructures to help improve quality of care, teamwork and communication.

=== Guinea ===
In August 2018 Mercy Ships arrived in Conakry for the fourth time and stayed there for a ten-month mission.

== Capabilities ==
=== Medical capabilities ===
Medical personnel on board the organization's hospital ships provide surgeries and healthcare to treat a wide range of problems, including cleft lip and palate, cataract, bowed legs (genu varum), burns and burn scars, dental problems and obstetric fistula repair for injuries sustained during childbirth. Many of these ailments are extremely severe because patients have had little prior access to medical care. In addition, people with disfiguring medical conditions have often been shunned by their communities, so medical treatment from Mercy Ships can also help relieve the stigma and isolation that they have experienced.

On the upper decks of the Africa Mercy, as of 2011 the ship had 126 cabins to provide accommodations for more than 400 crew. The ship is equipped with a day care center, an accredited academy for all grades through senior year of high school, a library, a launderette, a shop for groceries and sundries, a restaurant, a gymnasium, and a donated Starbucks cafe. A fleet of 28 vehicles travels with the ship, for use in Mercy Ship's land-based operations.

As of 2026, Global Mercy has six operating theatres and 200 hospital beds, along with rehab facilities.

=== Volunteer crew ===
During a typical year, the two ships will include more than 3,000 volunteers from 60 nations serving on board the fleet. About 200 African nationals also serve as day crew on the ship in any given port. Over 600 international volunteers work on the Global Mercy.

Mercy Ships offers short-term (from a few weeks up to a year) and long-term (more than one year) volunteer opportunities. Due to the nature of the ship, positions for surgeons, dentists, and nurses are often readily available, but jobs such as deckhands, carpenters, seamen, teachers, cooks, engineers, machinists, welders, plumbers, videographers, photographers, writers, electricians and agriculturalists are also available. Volunteer crew often serve as blood donors, since there is a high demand for donated blood due to limited space to maintain a blood bank on board.

== Fleet ==
=== Current fleet ===
Vessel Name	Built	Entered service for Mercy Ships	IMO	Image	Notes
Global Mercy	2021	2022	9726499		
Africa Mercy	1980	1999	7803188		

=== Past fleet ===
Vessel Name	Built	Entered service for Mercy Ships	Left service for Mercy Ships	IMO	Image	Notes
Anastasis	1953	1978	2007	5379729		Scrapped at the Alang Ship Breaking Yard in 2007
Good Samaritan (1983 - 1994) Island Mercy (1994 - 2001)	1961	1983	2001	5276135		[data missing]
Caribbean Mercy	1952	1994	2006	5280930		Scrapped in 2010
