= List of P&O Ferries ships =

This is a list of vessels that have served with any of the subsidiaries that make up P&O Ferries.

IMO Number	Name(s)	In service date	Out of service date	Tonnage	Passengers	Route(s) served	Notes	Images
9443566	Bore Song	2011		25,586	12	Teesport−Zeebrugge	In Service	RoRo ship Bore Song
9533816	Spirit of France	2012		49,000	2,000	Dover-Calais	In Service	Spirit of France
9524231	Spirit of Britain	2011		49,000	2,000	Dover-Calais	In Service	Spirit of Britain in 2017
9244116	European Highlander	2002		21,188	410	Cairnryan-Larne	In Service	
9215505	European Ambassador	2000	2004	24,206	405	Liverpool-Dublin; Mostyn-Dublin; Cherbourg-Dublin	Sold to Stena Line	
9208629	Pride of Hull	2001		59,925	1,360	Hull-Rotterdam	In Service	PRIDE OF HULL
9208617	Pride of Rotterdam	2001		59,925	1,360	Hull-Rotterdam	In Service	PRIDE OF ROTTERDAM
9208394	European Causeway	2000		20,646	410	Cairnryan-Larne	In Service	European Causeway
9186194	Norstream	1999		19,992	12	Teesport-Zeebrugge	In Service	Norstream in 2016
9186182	Norsky	1999		19,992	12	Teesport-Zeebrugge	In Service	Norsky
9181106	European Endeavour	2007	2019	22,152	300	Liverpool-Dublin	Sold to Eckerö Line May 2019.	European Endeavour
9176058	Max Mols (Caen Express)	2004	2004	5,617		Portsmouth-Caen	Returned to owner after closure of route	Catamaran Caen Express in 2004
9176046	Cherbourg Express (2004 - 2016); Express (2003); Portsmouth Express (2000–2002)	2000	2016	5,902	900	Portsmouth-Cherbourg; Troon/Cairnryan-Larne	Sold after closure of route in 2016	Fast ferry near Nab tower - geograph.org.uk - 375102
9170183	SuperStar Express	1998	2005	5,517	900	Portsmouth-Cherbourg; Troon/Cairnryan-Larne	Returned to owner.	
9147306	Brave Merchant	2003	2003	22,152	250	Teesport-Rotterdam	Short-term charter - returned to owner	
9147291	Norman Trader	2011	2011	22,152	250	Liverpool-Dublin	Short-term charter - returned to owner	
9129598	Tor Futura	2004	2004	18,469	12		Returned to owner	
9119402	Celtic Sun	2000	2001	7,606	12	Liverpool–Dublin	Returned to owner	Celtic Sun
9119397	RR Triumph (2005–2006); Lehola (2005)	2005	2006	7,606	12		Returned to owner	RR Triumph
9117454	Jetliner	1996	2000	4,563	577	Cairnryan-Larne	Returned to owner	The "Jetliner" in 1997
9107942	Pride of Cherbourg ^{3}	2002	2005	22,365	1,660	Portsmouth-Cherbourg	Sub chartered to Interislander after closure of route	
9056595	Norbay	1994		17,464	114	Liverpool-Dublin	In Service	Norbay
9056583	Norbank	1993		17,464	114	Liverpool-Dublin	In Service	Norbank
9015266	Pride of Kent ^{2} (2003 – 2023); European Highway (1992–2003)	1992	2023	30,365 (2003 – present); 22,986 (1992–2002)	2000 (2003 - present); 200 (1992-2002	Dover-Calais	Scrapped	Pride of Kent
9015254	Pride of Burgundy (2003 – 2023); PO Burgundy (2002–2003); P&OSL Burgundy (1999–2002); Pride of Burgundy (1993–1999)	1993	2023	28,138	1,420	Dover-Calais	Scrapped	Pride of Burgundy in 2004
9009633	Celtic Star						Returned to owner	CELTIC STAR
9007295	Pride of Canterbury (2003 – 2023); European Pathway (1992–2003)	1992	2024	30,365 (2003 – present); 22,986 (1992–2002)		Dover-Calais	Scrapped	P&O Ferries Pride of Canterbury
9007283	European Seaway	1991	2020	22,986		Dover-Calais	Sold	European Seaway in 2004
8912376	Bore Mari	2004	2005	5,972	12		Short-term charter - returned to owner	
8908466	Pride of Aquitaine (2003–2005); PO Aquitaine (2002–2003); P&OSL Aquitaine (1999–2002); Stena Royal (1998–1999)	1998	2005	28,838	2,000 (1999–2005); 1,350 (1998)	Dover-Calais	Sold to LD Lines	
8712520	Pride of Portsmouth	1994	2005	33,336		Portsmouth-Le Havre	Returned to owner after closure of route	Pride of Portsmouth in 2005
8712518	Pride of Le Havre ^{2}	1994	2005	33,336		Portsmouth-Le Havre	Returned to owner after closure of route	Pride of Le Havre
8517748	Pride of Calais (2003); PO Calais (2002–2003); P&OSL Calais (1999–2002); Pride of Calais (1987–1999)	1987		26,433	2,290	Dover-Calais	Scrapped	Pride of Calais in 2007
8517736	Pride of Dover (2003–2010); PO Dover (2002–2003); P&OSL Dover (1999–2002); Pride of Dover (1987–1999)	1987	2010	26,433	2,290	Dover-Calais	Scrapped	Pride of Dover in 2006
8503797	Pride of Bruges (2003 – 2021); Norsun (1987–2003)	1987	2021	31,598	930	Hull-Zeebrugge; Hull-Rotterdam	Sold to Grandi Navi Veloci	Pride of Bruges in 2016
8501957	Pride of York (2002 – 2021); Norsea (1987–2002)	1987	2021	31,785	1,250	Hull-Zeebrugge; Hull-Rotterdam	Sold to Grandi Navi Veloci	Clyde built "Pride of York" in 2010
8414582	Pride of Bilbao	1993	2010	37,799	2,500	Portsmouth-Bilbao	Returned to owner after closure of route	
8012152	Roseanne	1989	1991	7,744	12		Returned to owner	
8009088	Hoburgen	2007	2008	9,080	12		Returned to owner	
7909621	Stena Shipper	2004	2004	5,120	12		Returned to owner	
7907257	Pride of Provence (2003–2004); PO Provence (2002–2003); P&OSL Provence (1999–2002); Stena Empereur (1998)	1998	2004	28,727	1,500	Dover-Calais	Sold to GA Ferries, scrapped 2011	
7902647	Norqueen	1996	2002	17,884	12		In Service	RoRo ship MV Norqueen in Rotterdam
7902635	Norking	1996	2002	17,884	12		In Service	NORKING
7820497	P&OSL Picardy (1999–2001); Pride of Bruges ^{1} (1988–1999); Pride of Free Enterprise^{E} (1987–1988)	1987	2001	13,601	1,326	Dover-Calais	Sold to Transeuropa Ferries	1987 ferry PRIDE OF BRUGES in 1993
9895161	P&O Pioneer (2023 onwards)	2023		47,394	1,500	Dover-Calais		
9895173	P&O Liberté (2024 onwards)	2024		47,394	1,500	Dover-Calais		
7820473	PO Kent (2002–2003); P&OSL Kent (1999–2002); Pride of Kent ^{1}(1987–1999); Spirit of Free Enterprise ^{E} (1987)	1987	2003	20,466 (1992–2003); 13,601 (1987–1992)	1,825 (1992–2003); 1,325 (1987–1992)	Dover-Calais	Sold to GA Ferries	
7816501	Sapphire	1999	2002	6,568	6		Returned to owner	
7816496	Rodona	1999	2002	6,658	6		Returned to owner	RoRo ship Rodona
7814462	PO Canterbury (2002–2003); P&OSL Canterbury (1999–2002); Stena Fantasia (1998–1999)	1998	2003	25,122	1,800	Dover-Calais	Sold to Polferries	
7813937	Stena Cambria	1998	1999	7,003	1,400	Newhaven-Dieppe	Sold to Umafisa	
7800760	Equine						Returned to owner	
7800758	Southern Carrier	2000	2000	16,947	12		Returned to owner	
7800746	Ursine	2007	2008	16,947	12		Returned to owner	
7800112	Merchant Victor	1995	1996	5,881	12		Returned to owner	The "Merchant Victor" in 1994
7729045	Vega	1997	1997	14,715	12		Returned to owner	
7725362	Belard	1985	1997	1,599	12		Returned to owner	The "Belard" in 1990
7724265	Merchant Brilliant						Returned to owner	MV "Merchant Brilliant" in 2008
7528611	Atlantic Freighter	1994	1995	5,466	12	Dublin-Liverpool	Returned to owner	
7720477	Gabriele Wehr	1989	1999	2,185	12	Portsmouth-Le Havre	Returned to owner	
7716086	Norcape	1996	2011	14,087	12	Hull-Zeebrugge; Tilbury-Zeebrugge; Liverpool-Dublin; Troon-Larne	Scrapped 2011	Norcape in Rotterdam in 2007
7716074	European Envoy (1998–2004); Ibex (1979-1984); Norsea (1984-1986); Norsky (1986-1995); Ibex (1995-1998)	1979	2004			Liverpool-Dublin; Mostyn-Dubin	Sold to Trond A Kittelsen Shipping	The "Ibex" in 1997
7712121	Tidero Star	1997	2000	3,894	12		Returned to owner	
7711139	European Endeavour ^{1} (1987–2002); European Enterprise ^{E} (1987)	1987	2002	22,152		Dover-Zeebrugge; Cairnryan-Larne	Sold to Transeuropa Ferries	The "European Endeavour" in 2002
7708778	European Trader	2008	2012	17,068	12	Teesport-Rotterdam	Scrapped	P&O "European Trader" in 2010
7636092	European Mariner (2001–2011); European Highlander (1998–2001); Lion (1995–1998)	1995	2011	5,897	12	Troon-Larne	Scrapped 2011	European Mariner in 2009
7613404	Thomas Wehr	1994	1999	7,628	12	Portsmouth-Le Havre	Returned to owner	
7528661	European Diplomat (2001–2005); Pride of Suffolk (1992–2001); Baltic Ferry ^{E} (1987–1992)	1987	2001	18,732		Felixstowe-Zeebrugge; Rosslare-Cherbourg	Sold to Celtic Link Ferries	The "Diplomat" in 2004
7528659	Pride of Flanders (1992–2002); Nordic Ferry ^{E} (1980–1992)	1987	2002	18,732	688 (1980–1995); 144 (1995–2002)	Felixstowe-Zeebrugge; Felixstowe-Rotterdam	Sold to Stena Line	NORDIC FERRY in 1980
7528568	Global Freighter						Returned to owner	Global Freighter in 15.5.2010
7528647	Global Carrier	2006	2008	5,466	12		Returned to owner	Global Carrier in 2007
7528635	European Freeway (1992–2002); Cerdic Ferry ^{E} (1987–1992)	1987	2002	21,162	166	Felixstowe-Rotterdam	Sold to Stena Line	
7528570	European Tideway (1992–2002); Doric Ferry ^{E} (1987–1992)	1987	2002	21,162	166	Felixstowe-Rotterdam	Sold to Stena Line	
7521223	Norcove	1995	1999	10,279	12	Middlesbrough-Rotterdam; Middlesbrough-Zeebrugge	Returned to owner	
7501613	Argo	1990	1991	9,079	205		Short-term charter, returned to owner	
7501285	European Navigator (1998–2003); Leopard (1996–1998); Viking Trader ^{E} (1987–1996)	1987	2003	9,085	48		Sold	The "Viking Trader" in 1996
7427752	Calibur	2007	2008	3,563	12		Returned to owner	Calibur in 2007
7411258	European Pathfinder ^{E} (1998–2002); Panther (1996–1998); European Clearway (1987–1996)	1987	2002	8,023	132	Rosslare-Cherbourg; Cairnryan-Larne	Sold to Transeuropa Ferries	European Clearway with European Trader in 1987
7400273	European Trader	1987	2001	8,007	132	Cairnryan-Larne	Sold to Taygran Shipping	European Trader with European Clearway in 1987
7389194	Dana Hafnia	1996	1996	5,326	12		Returned to owner	
7383451	Seahawk	1996	1998	8,055	12		Returned to owner	
7368499	Pride of Canterbury ^{1} (1987–1993); Free Enterprise VIII ^{E} (1987)	1987	1993	5,169	980	Dover-Calais	Sold	
7361594	European Seafarer	1978	2004	10,957	40	Fleetwood-Larne	Sold to Stena Line	
7361582	European Leader (1998–2004); Buffalo (1975–1998)	1975	2004	12,879	80	Fleetwood-Larne	Sold to Stena Line	The "Buffalo" in 1986
7361570	European Pioneer (1997–2004); Bison (1975–1997)	1975	2004	14,426	76	Fleetwood-Larne	Sold to Stena Line	The "Bison" in 1996
7360710	Norstar	1996	2001	26,919	1,042	Hull-Zeebrugge; Hull-Rotterdam	Sold to SNAV	MV Norstar in 2001
7358327	Pride of Winchester (1989–1995); Viking Viscount ^{E} (1987–1989)	1987	1995	6,386	1,100	Portsmouth-Cherbourg	Sold to Lasithiotiki Anonymi Naftiliaki Eteria (L.A.N.E.)	The "Viking Viscount" in 1989
7358303	Pride of Cherbourg II (1994); Pride Of Cherbourg ^{1} (1989–1994); Viking Voyager ^{E} (1987–1989)	1987	1994	6,386	918	Portsmouth-Cherbourg	Sold to Fred. Olsen. Scrapped in 2011	
7358298	Pride of Cherbourg A (2002); Pride of Cherbourg ^{2} (1994–2002); Pride of Le Havre ^{1} (1989–1994); Viking Valiant ^{E} (1987–1989)	1987	2002	14,760	1,316	Portsmouth-Cherbourg; Portsmouth-Le Havre	Sold to El Salam Maritime. Scrapped in 2010	"Pride Of Le Havre" in July 1989
7358286	Pride of Hampshire (1989–2002); Viking Venturer ^{E} (1987–1989)	1987	2002	14,760	1,316	Portsmouth-Cherbourg; Portsmouth-Le Havre	Sold to El Salam Maritime. Scrapped in 2010	Pride of Hampshire in 1991
7333822	Norland	1996	2002	26,290	1042	Hull-Zeebrugge; Hull-Rotterdam	Sold to SNAV	Norland in Rotterdam in 1979
7310260	Saint Patrick II	1990	1991	7,984	1,172		Returned to owner.	
7230616	Pride of Rathlin (1992–1998); Pride of Walmer (1988–1992); Free Enterprise VII ^{E} (1987–1988)	1987	2000	12,503	1,035	Dover-Zeebrugge; Cairnryan-Larne	Sold to Sungi Budi	Pride of Rathlin in 2000
7204291	Pride of Ailsa (1992–1996); Pride of Sandwich (1987–1992); Free Enterprise VI ^{E} (1987)	1987	1996	12,503	1,035	Dover-Zeebrugge; Cairnryan-Larne	Sold to El Salam Maritime. Lost 2005	The "Pride of Ailsa" in 1996
7010509	Pride of Hythe (1988–1993); Free Enterprise V ^{E} (1987–1988)	1987	1993	5,044	1,132		Sold	"Pride of Hythe" in 1989
6728563	European Freighter (1991–1993); Europic Ferry ^{E} (1971–1991)	1987	1993	4,190		Cairnryan-Larne	Sold to Med Link Line	The "Europic Ferry" in 1990
6710906	Ionic Ferry	1987	1992	6,100	850		Sold	The "Ionic Ferry" in 1989
6703317	Ulster Queen	1971	1982	4,270	1,008		Sold	
