= MS Oscar Wilde (2010) =

Irish ferry

- "Oscar Wilde"

History
- Name: Spirit of Britain (2010–2024); Oscar Wilde (2024–present)
- Owner: P&O Ferries
- Operator: Irish Ferries
- Port of registry: 2012–2019: Dover, United Kingdom; 2019–present: Limassol, Cyprus
- Route: Dover–Calais
- Ordered: 2008
- Builder: STX Europe, Rauma shipyard, Finland
- Yard number: 1367
- Laid down: 25 August 2009
- Launched: 8 June 2010
- In service: 21 January 2011
- Identification: Call sign: 2DXD4; IMO number: 9524231; MMSI number: 235082716
- Status: In service

General characteristics
- Tonnage: 47,592 GT
- Length: 213.5 m (700 ft 6 in)
- Beam: 31 m (101 ft 8 in)
- Draught: 6.7 m (22 ft 0 in)
- Installed power: 4 x MAN 7L 48/60 diesel engines
- Propulsion: 2 × controllable pitch propellers; 3 × bow thrusters
- Speed: 22 knots (41 km/h; 25 mph)
- Capacity: 2,000 passengers; 180 lorries or 1,059 cars
- Notes: 2,700 lane meters

MS Oscar Wilde is a cross-channel ferry to be operated by Irish Ferries on the Dover-Calais route. Formerly named Spirit of Britain, she is the first of two Spirit-class ships built for P&O Ferries, the other being Spirit of France. The vessels are the largest ferries constructed for the cross-channel route. She was chartered by Irish Ferries after being laid up by P&O in early 2024; with the obligation to purchase after two years.

== History ==
P&O Ferries signed a €360m contract with Aker Yards (later renamed STX Europe) on 8 August 2008, for the two largest ferries ever to be constructed for the Dover-Calais service. The first of these ships was to enter service in January 2011, and the second in September 2011, replacing Pride of Dover and Pride of Calais.

The new vessels were specifically designed for the Dover-Calais route and are built to Lloyd's Register "Green Passport" which provides a comprehensive strategy for all materials used. The ferries are environmentally friendly, offering significant advances in fuel efficiency through a hydro-dynamically efficient hull form that optimises vessel performance with minimum fuel consumption. They are the first passenger ferries in the world to comply with the new International Maritime Organization "Safe Return to Port" requirements, ahead of the international compliance date. These rules require that, in the event of a ship becoming a casualty, basic services are provided to all persons on board and that certain systems remain operational for safe return to port. Performance standards are stipulated for a wide range of ship systems including fire-fighting, power supply, propulsion, steering and navigation. The requirements come into force for vessels built after 1 July 2010.

The ships have the Lloyd's Register class notation of PSMR (propulsion and steering machinery redundancy) which will be assigned where the main propulsion and steering systems are configured to ensure that, in the event of equipment failure, the ship retains availability of propulsion power and manoeuvring capability to provide a safe return to port.

== Construction and career ==
On 3 March 2009, the first steel plate was cut by P&O Ferries chief executive, Helen Deeble. On 25 August the keel block was laid at the STX Europe's Rauma shipyard in Rauma, Finland. In keeping with maritime tradition, coins were placed under the keel for good fortune. On 13 May 2010 it was announced that the new ships would be named Spirit of Britain and Spirit of France. Spirit of Britain was originally to be called Olympic Spirit, but was renamed to avoid copyright infringement. Dame Kelly Holmes agreed to become godmother to the Spirit of Britain.

On 8 June 2010 Spirit of Britain was floated out of its construction dock in Rauma and manoeuvred to the fitting out quay by tugs.

On 23 November 2010 the ship departed Rauma at 10:00 for her first sea trials in the Gulf of Bothnia. In December 2010 the vessel's registered owner and ship manager became P&O Short Sea Ferries Ltd, Dover, United Kingdom. On 5 January 2011 Spirit of Britain was delivered to P&O Ferries at Rauma and departed on her delivery voyage to Dover. Owing to heavy ice conditions in the Baltic Sea she was escorted by the icebreaker Nordica until she reached Stockholm, Sweden. On 9 January the ferry arrived at the Port of Dover shortly after 11:00 escorted by the Dover Harbour Board tugs Dauntless and Doughty. On 14 and 15 January Spirit of Britain carried out berthing trials within the ports of Dover and Calais. On 21 January the ferry entered commercial service between Dover and Calais under the command of senior master, Captain David Miller.

However, on 24 January Spirit of Britain Proceeded to ARNO in Dunkerque for 48 hours of remedial work to ensure a better port fit in the port of Calais. Her bow spade was extended by 300 mm (12 in) on deck five and by 150 mm (5.9 in) on deck three. On 4 February the ferry aborted her 09:20 sailing with technical problems. It was reported that she was suffering shaft problems. She departed Dover at 12:30 with the assistance of two tugs and proceeded to the Margate Roads. The following day Spirit of Britain departed the Margate Roads bound for Zeebrugge, arriving at 23:30 and returned to Dover on 6 February at 22:00 before taking up the 23:15 sailing to Calais. On 24 March the vessel was officially named Spirit of Britain by Dame Kelly Holmes at Dover's eastern docks. She sailed from the port at 13:30 for a special cruise before returning to Dover at 14:30. She resumed service between Dover and Calais at 17:30. On 10 May 2011 the ship was reported to be out of service due to an electrical problem but returned to service the following day.

On 23 January 2016 western anarchists encouraged some 350 illegal immigrants from the Calais Jungle to storm the port of Calais. Around 50 people got on board Spirit of Britain and were later arrested by police.

In early 2019, Spirit of Britain was reflagged from the Port of Dover England to Limassol, Cyprus in the lead up to Brexit.

On 21 March 2022 United Kingdom Transport Secretary Grant Shapps announced that he would seek P&O Ferries to rename Spirit of Britain and other ships on the fleet which carry British names if the company were found to have breached employment regulations following the summary dismissal without notice via Zoom of 800 British seafarers to be replaced with cheaper overseas agency workers. P&O Ferries CEO Peter Hebblethwaite confirmed on 24 March that P&O was aware that its firing the seafarers without consultation was illegal.

In May 2024 it was announced that Irish Ferries would charter the ship. As part of the two-year charter agreement, Spirit of Britain was renamed Oscar Wilde.
