= P&O Pioneer =

Rollon rolloff ferry

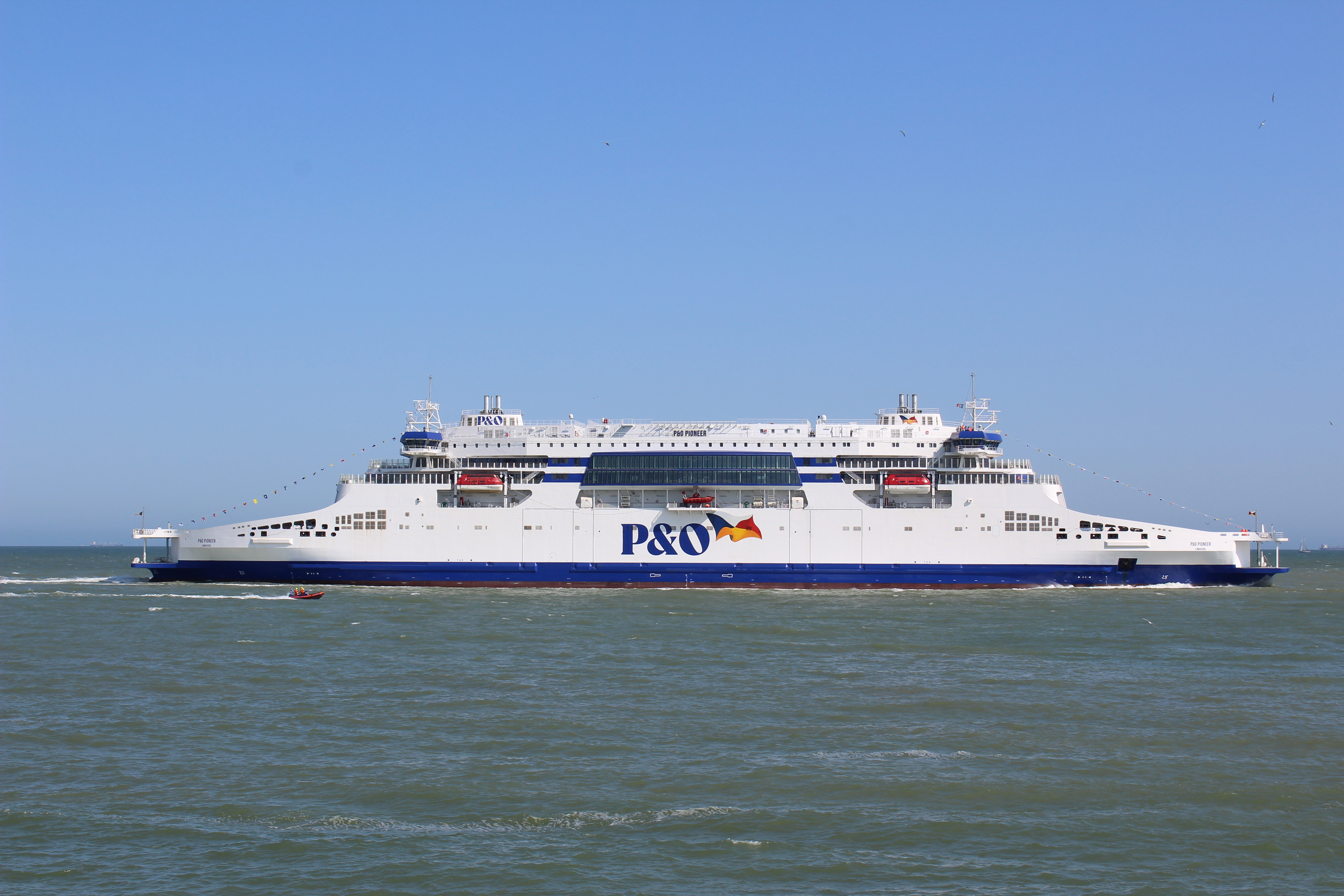
- P&O Pioneer in June 2023

History
- Name: P&O Pioneer
- Owner: P&O Ferries
- Operator: P&O Ferries
- Port of registry: Limassol, Cyprus
- Route: Dover to Calais
- Builder: Guangzhou Shipyard International, Guangzhou, China
- Cost: £130 million
- Yard number: 19121007
- Laid down: 21 December 2020
- Launched: 2 January 2022
- In service: 19 June 2023
- Identification: IMO number: 9895161

General characteristics
- Tonnage: 47,394 GT
- Length: 230.5 m (756 ft 3 in)
- Beam: 30.8 m (101 ft 1 in)
- Decks: 10
- Propulsion: 4 × Wärtsilä 16v31 diesel engine, with 8 MWh battery; 4 × 7.5 MW ABB DO1600 Azipods
- Speed: 20.8 knots (38.5 km/h; 23.9 mph)
- Capacity: 1,500 passengers; 2,800 lane metres for commercial traffic, 800 lane metres for cars; 3,600 lane metres total

P&O Pioneer is a roll-on/roll-off hybrid ferry operated by P&O Ferries across the English Channel between Dover and Calais.

== Design ==
Unlike previous ferries operated on the channel, the P&O Pioneer's design (by OSK in Odense) is a radical shift away from convention. Instead of having a distinct bow and stern like previous designs for the English Channel, the P&O Pioneer utilises a double-ended hull design, with two bridges. While double-ended ferries have been utilised for a long time in various guises — some notable examples include the 160-metre BC Ferries' Coastal-class ferries and Staten Island Ferries — the P&O Pioneer is the first double-ended ferry on the Channel, alongside being the first double-ended ship of her size. According to P&O, using two bridges on both ends instead of one saves two minutes in either harbour as there is no need to turn the ship around when docking or departing. The P&O Pioneer is the first ship on the Channel to utilise diesel-electric Azipod propulsion, with four Azipods mounted in corners around the hull of the vessel, capable of swivelling 360 degrees. The ship features some 8.8 megawatt hours of Xalt batteries, allowing for a departure from Dover or Calais without diesel engines, extending the use of the SOLAS Convention's Safe Return to Port requirement as a general reliability tool. These ships are designed to also be converted to battery-electric propulsion at a later date, when charging infrastructure is available on both sides of the Channel. On the port and starboard sides amidships, the ship will feature two sets of panoramic windows giving a view of both the French and British coastlines.

== History ==
The ships were first announced in September 2019 in a P&O press release. In the press release, it was announced that P&O had ordered two ships of the class, with two further options for a total of four ships. However, it was not until January 2020 when the first renders of the ships were released, including some additional technical details. On 15 October 2020, the first steel was cut in the construction of the P&O Pioneer. Later, it was announced on 21 December 2020 that the keels for both the P&O Pioneer and P&O Liberté were laid down. Construction continued throughout 2021 without any news when on 2 January the P&O Pioneer was launched, alongside name announcements and further technical disclosure.

P&O Pioneer entered service on 19 June 2023. In April 2023, prior to entering service, an issue with her passenger lifeboat was discovered following a lifeboat drill, which resulted in the need to stop over in Dunkerque, France, for further investigation.
