= P&O Liberté =

Roll-on/roll-off hybrid ferry

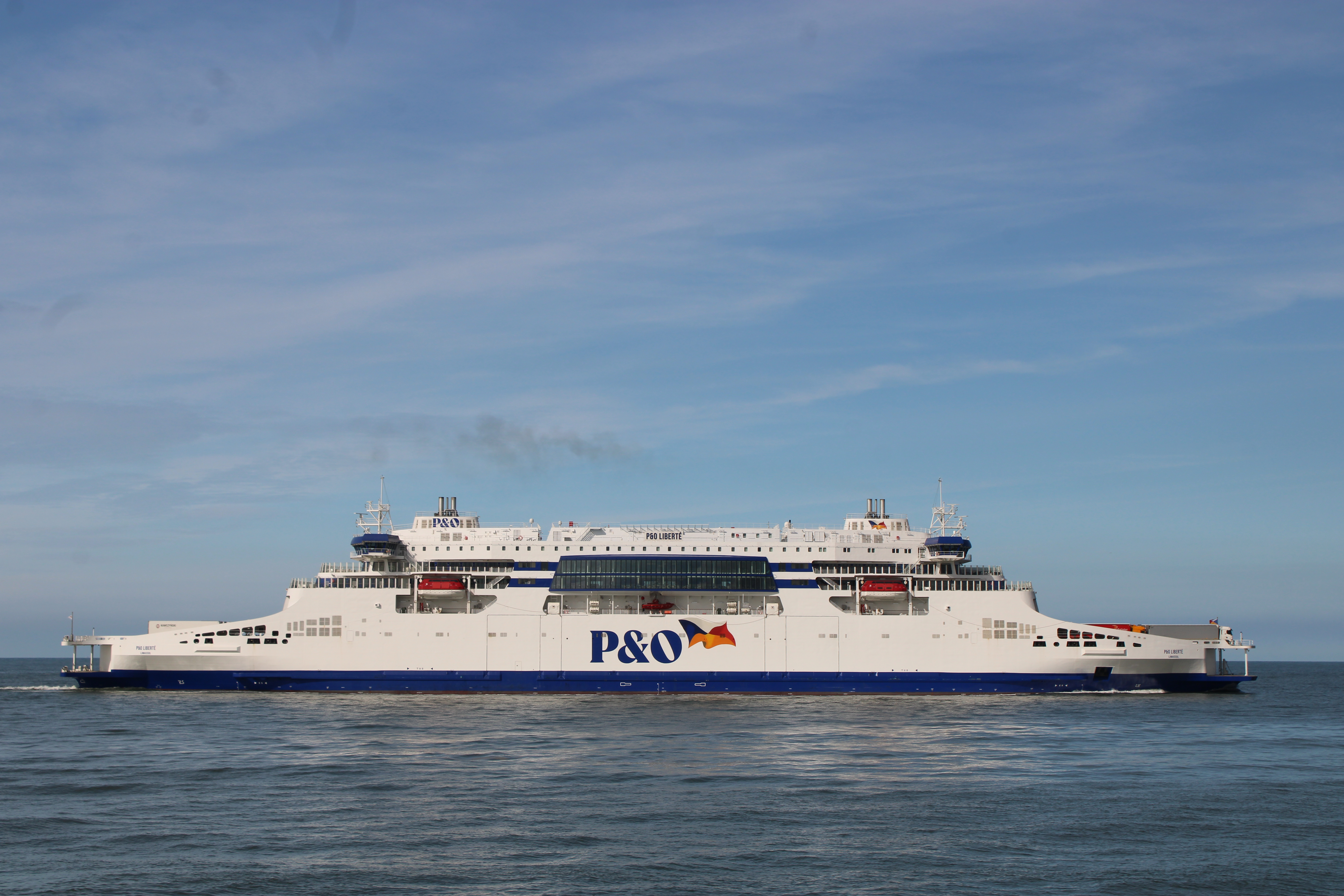
- P&O Liberté in March 2024

History
- Name: P&O Liberté
- Owner: P&O Ferries
- Operator: P&O Ferries
- Port of registry: Limassol, Cyprus
- Route: Dover to Calais
- Builder: Guangzhou Shipyard International, Guangzhou, China
- Yard number: 19121008
- Launched: July 2022
- Identification: IMO number: 9895173

General characteristics
- Tonnage: 47,394 GT
- Length: 230.5 m (756 ft 3 in)
- Beam: 30.8 m (101 ft 1 in)
- Decks: 12
- Propulsion: 4 × Wärtsilä 16v31 diesel engine, with 8 MWh battery; 4 × 7.5 MW ABB DO1600 Azipods
- Speed: 20.8 knots (38.5 km/h; 23.9 mph)
- Capacity: 1,500 passengers; 2,800 lane metres for commercial traffic, 800 lane metres for cars; 3,600 lane metres total

P&O Liberté is a roll-on/roll-off hybrid ferry operated by P&O Ferries across the English Channel between Dover and Calais.

== Design ==
The P&O Liberté and sister ship P&O Pioneer were ordered by P&O Ferries in September 2019 to operate across the English Channel between Dover and Calais. It has been designed to also be converted to battery-electric propulsion at a later date, when charging infrastructure is available on both sides of the channel.

Built by Guangzhou Shipyard International, Guangzhou, China, it was launched in July 2022 and delivered in November 2023, P&O Liberté entered service on 22 March 2024.
