= European Highlander =

Ship name

European Highlander is the name of the following ships:

- European Highlander (1998 ship), a ferry previously named Salahala, Merchant Valiant and Lion, renamed European Mariner in 2001.
- European Highlander (2002 ship), a ferry built in 2002.
