= Port of Dover =

Cross-channel port situated in Dover, Kent, south-east England

Coordinates: 51°07′09″N 1°19′46″E

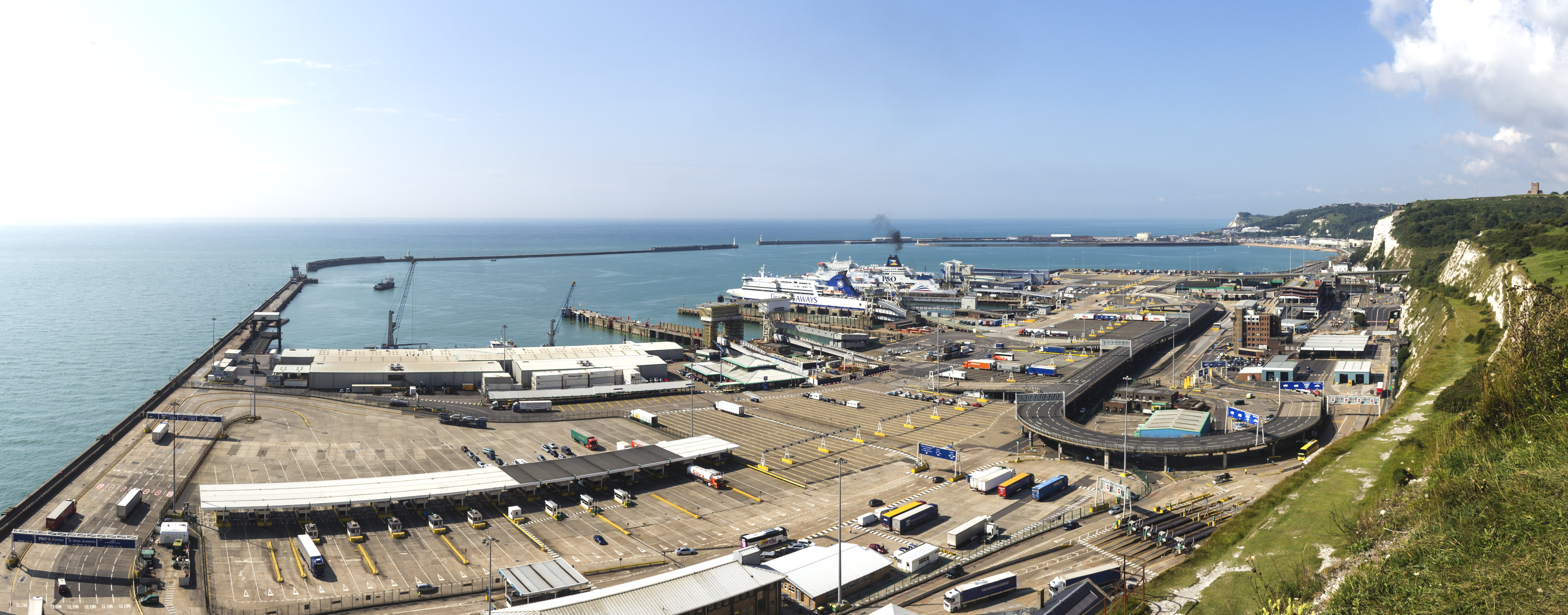
- The Port of Dover pictured in 2014, with the Eastern Docks in the foreground and the Western Docks in the distance
- Interactive map of Port of Dover

Location
- Country: United Kingdom
- Location: Dover, Kent

Details
- Opened: 1606; 420 years ago
- Operated by: Dover Harbour Board
- Owned by: Dover Harbour Board
- No. of berths: 8
- No. of piers: 2

Statistics
- Passenger traffic: 10,863,262 (2019)
- Annual turnover: £58.5 million
- Website www.portofdover.com

The Port of Dover is a cross-channel ferry, cruise terminal, maritime cargo and marina facility situated in Dover, Kent, south-east England. It is the nearest English port to France, at just 34 kilometres (21 mi) away, and is one of the world's busiest maritime passenger ports, with 11.7 million passengers, 2.6 million lorries, 2.2 million cars and motorcycles and 80,000 coaches passing through it in 2017, and with an annual turnover of £58.5 million a year. This compares with the nearby Channel Tunnel, the only fixed link between the island of Great Britain and the European mainland, which now handles an estimated 20 million passengers and 1.6 million trucks per year.

The modern port facility features a large artificial harbour constructed behind stone piers and a defensive concrete breakwater. The port is divided into two main sections: the Eastern Docks serve as the main cross-channel ferry terminal, while the Western Docks contain a cruise ship terminal and a yacht marina along with cargo facilities.

The Port of Dover has a long history and possesses several listed buildings and structures. The port is owned and operated by the Dover Harbour Board, a statutory corporation formed by royal charter in 1606 by King James I. Most of the board members of the Dover Harbour Board are appointees of the Department for Transport. The port has its own private police force, the Port of Dover Police. The current port traffic volumes and urban population categorise Dover as a Large-Port Town.

== History ==
Dover Harbour Act 1603
- Act of Parliament
- Parliament of England
- Long title: An Acte for repaire of Dover Haven.
- Citation: 1 Jas. 1. c. 32 (Note: This is the citation in The Statutes of the Realm.); 2 Jas. 1. c. 32 (Note: This is the citation in The Statutes at Large.)
- Territorial extent: England and Wales

Dates
- Royal assent: 7 July 1604
- Commencement: 7 July 1611 (Note: Section 1. 7 years.)
- Repealed: 30 July 1948
Other legislation
Repealed by	Statute Law Revision Act 1948
Relates to	Dover Harbour Repairs Act 1662

Status: Repealed

Text of statute as originally enacted

Recent archaeology indicates that Dover's history as a port and trading gateway dates back at least as far as the Stone and Bronze ages. Known as Dubris during the Roman occupation of Britain, the port has always enjoyed a significant strategic position due to its proximity to continental Europe and as the location of the sheltered River Dour estuary between two imposing chalk cliffs. The development of the port led directly to the growth of Dover as a settlement and, over many centuries, to the building of extensive defensive fortifications including Dover Castle and the Dover Western Heights. In the Roman era a walled town was built on the West Bank of the River Dour and the port grew into an important military, mercantile and cross-channel harbour. Dubris was one of the principal starting points of the Roman road later known as Watling Street.

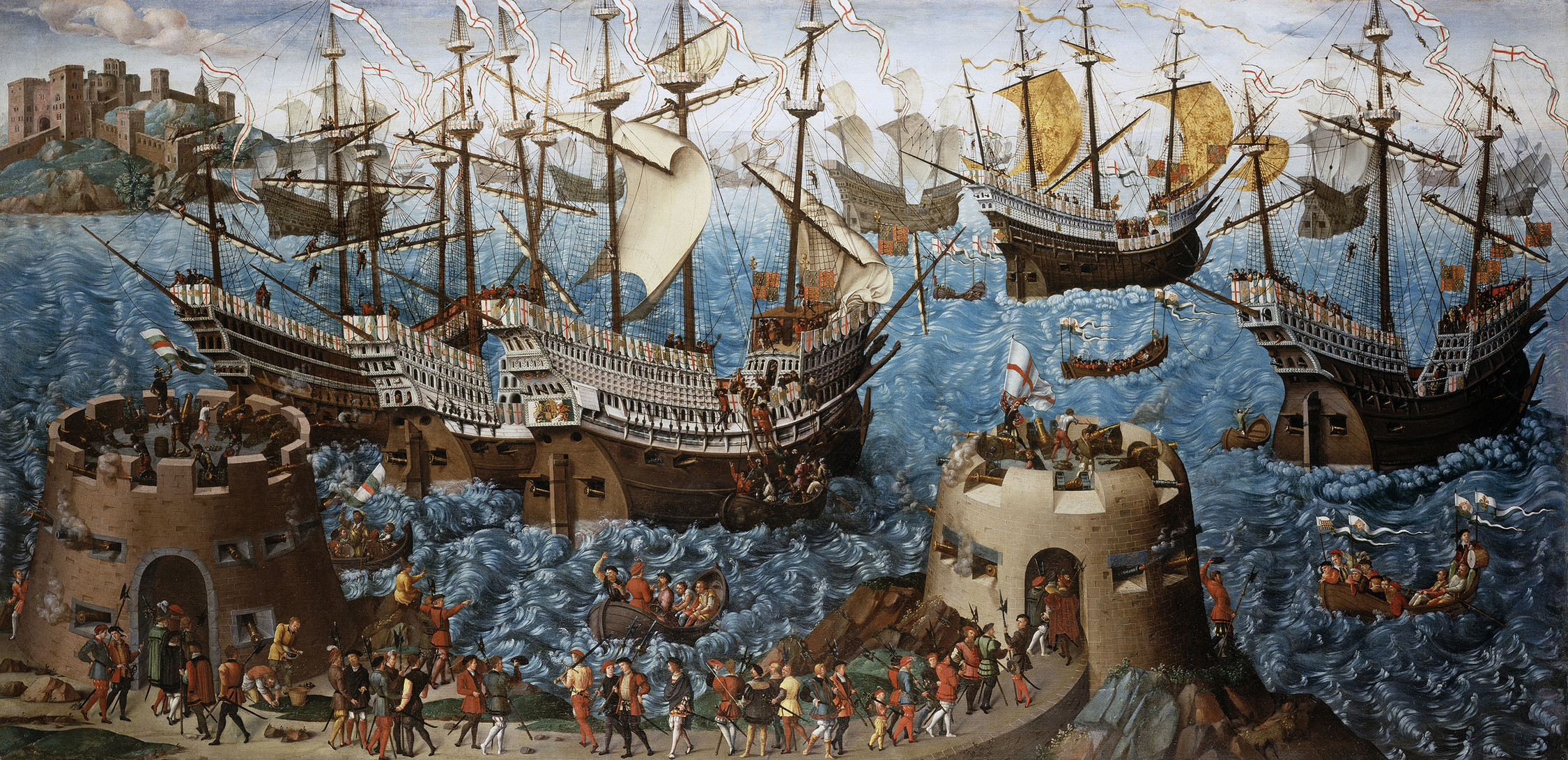
Henry VIII embarking at the Port of Dover in 1520. Royal Collection, Hampton Court.

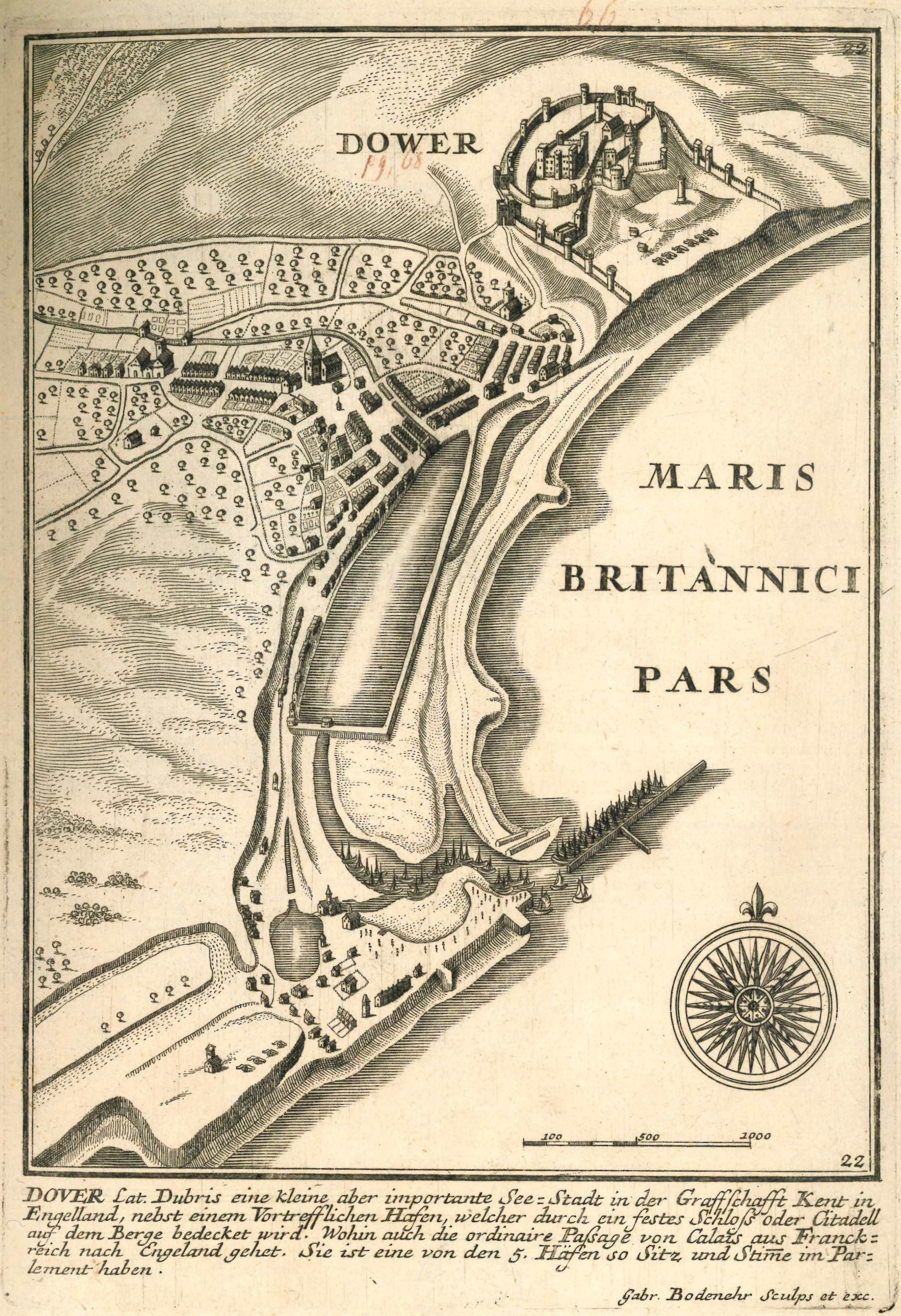
Plan of Dover by Gabriel Bodenehr, c.1730. Visible are the castle, the town, the Great Pent, and the harbour.

Dover grew further after the Norman invasion of 1066 as a member of the Confederation of Cinque Ports. After the martyrdom of Archbishop Thomas Becket at Canterbury Cathedral in 1170, Dover flourished as the only designated port of entry for foreign pilgrims and as a point of departure for the third and subsequent crusades. Following Edward III's success at the Battle of Sluys in 1340, a large defensive wall was built around the town. Although few concerted attempts to manage the shingle deposits blocking the harbour entrance were made during the late Middle Ages, a short pier and two defensive towers were constructed at the port in years immediately prior to Henry VIII's departure to the royal summit known as the Field of the Cloth of Gold in 1520.

Dover Harbour Repairs Act 1662
- Act of Parliament
- Parliament of England
- Long title: An Act for repairing of Dover Harbour.
- Citation: 14 Cha. 2. c. 27; 13 & 14 Cha. 2. c. 27
- Territorial extent: England and Wales

Dates
- Royal assent: 19 May 1662
- Commencement: 24 June 1662 (Note: Section 1.)
- Expired: 23 June 1669 (Note: Section 1. 7 years.)
- Repealed: 30 July 1948
Other legislation
Amended by	Dover Harbour Act 1603
Repealed by	Statute Law Revision Act 1948

Status: Repealed

Text of statute as originally enacted

In the 1580s, under the direction of Thomas Digges and championed by Sir Walter Raleigh, early port infrastructure work commenced to address siltation through the use of sluices and the development of an enclosed pool of water known as the Great Pent, by means of which the harbour could be periodically scoured. The Great Pent was formed by the construction of a cross wall across the existing natural shingle lagoon at the mouth of the River Dour: the work was largely undertaken by labourers from Romney Marsh, using skills honed in the construction of seawalls. The project has been described as "one of the most successful engineering enterprises of [Queen] Elizabeth's reign". The later construction of Wellington Dock, designed by James Walker in the early 1830s, occupies the approximate footprint of the Great Pent.

After the threats of the Napoleonic Wars at the beginning of the 19th century, the Admiralty selected Dover as the most suitable location of a harbour of refuge for the fleet between the dockyards of Chatham and Portsmouth. In 1847 construction began on the Admiralty Pier. Envisaged as the Western Arm of the proposed haven, completion of the massive first stage in 1871 effectively stopped the silting of the harbour mouth as it cut off the drift of shingle from the direction of Folkestone. The Admiralty Pier was constructed using a foundation of Portland stone blocks surmounted by granite and durable Bramley Fall stone on the seaward facing exterior. Stothert & Pitt's 1885 Price Book records Messers H. Lee & Co as concrete contractor using a Lee's Mixer, an early example of concrete mixers used during construction on the Admiralty Pier. Further construction from 1897 onwards established the Eastern Arm of the current harbour, the Southern Breakwater and a further extension of the Admiralty Pier.

During the First World War, a former cargo ship, the Spanish Prince, was deliberately sunk by the Admiralty close to the entrance to Dover Harbour to prevent German U-Boats from firing torpedoes into the harbour. During World War II, the remains of another ship, the War Sepoy, were sunk alongside the Spanish Prince.

=== Eastern Docks ===
Dover's Eastern Docks were used for ship breaking beginning during the First World War, when the Admiralty began dismantling ships there. The Stanlee Shipbreaking and Salvage Co. Ltd. took over the ship breaking operation commercially in 1920. Many of the ships broken up were naval vessels from the First World War. The company also handled machinery and general scrap, including the dismantling of the Dover Promenade Pier. The yard began to shrink after World War II and was closed in 1964 to make way for port redevelopment and a car ferry terminal.

From 1930 until 1950 an aerial ropeway carried coal from Tilmanstone colliery, 7½ miles to the north. It emerged halfway up the Langdon cliffs directly above the Eastern harbour arm, through two portals which have been bricked up but can still be seen from the ferry port. Coal was deposited in bunkers at the outer end of the Eastern harbour arm. The ropeway had 600 1-ton buckets that departed at intervals of 21 seconds and travelled at 4½ miles per hour. The system could thus transport 120 tons of coal per hour.

Dover Harbour Act 1950 (Note: Section 1.)
- Act of Parliament
- Parliament of the United Kingdom
- Long title: An Act to authorise the Dover Harbour Board to construct new works and for other purposes.
- Citation: 14 Geo. 6. c. xlvii
- Territorial extent: United Kingdom

Dates
- Royal assent: 28 July 1950
- Commencement: 28 Jul 1950 (Note: The Acts of Parliament (Commencement) Act 1793.)
Other legislation
Amends	Dover Harbour Act 1828; Dover Harbour Act 1873; Dover Harbour Act 1898
Relates to	Dover Harbour Act 1828; Harbours and Passing Tolls, &c. Act 1861; Town and Country Planning Act 1947

Status: Current legislation

Text of statute as originally enacted

The first two roll-on/roll-off ferry berths in the Eastern Docks were opened on 30 June 1953. The first ro-ro ferry, the appropriately modified British Railways' SS Dinard, departed for Boulogne on 3 July 1953. Today, there are seven active docks for Ro-Ro vessels to utilise at Dover, one deconstructed dock and one unused dock for high-speed Ro-Ro watercraft.

In 1966 well over 600,000 accompanied vehicles travelled through Dover's Eastern Docks en route to France or Belgium.

=== Western Docks ===
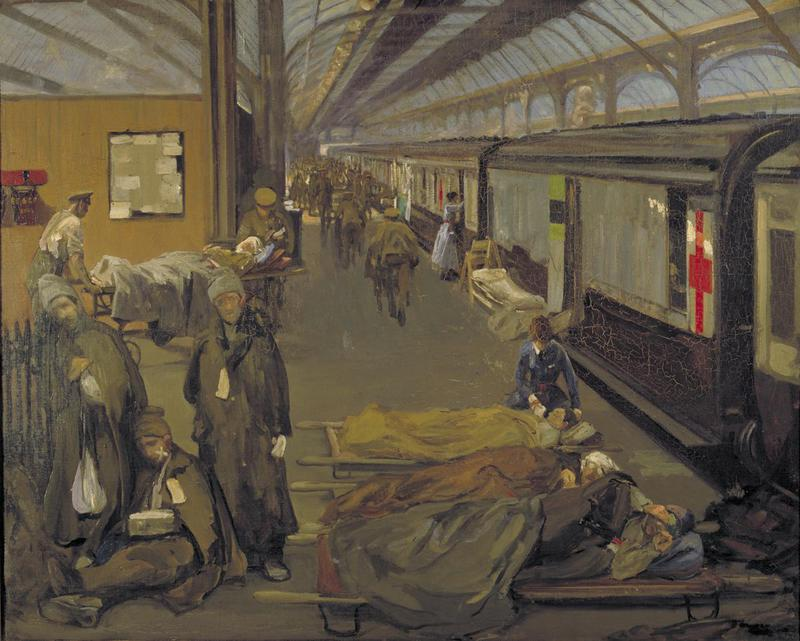
The Wounded at Dover, 1918 by John Lavery. From the collections of the Imperial War Museum

After rail services were extended to Dover in 1844, the Western Docks were used as a terminal for the Golden Arrow and other cross-channel train services with its own railway station, Dover Marine, later renamed Dover Western Docks. At Dover Marine station an estimated 5 million troops departed for the trenches of World War I and nearly 1.5 million wounded soldiers returned. In 1920 the remains of the Unknown Warrior were landed prior to transportation to London and a ceremonial interment at Westminster Abbey. Dover Marine railway station closed in 1994, later to be redeveloped into Cruise Terminal One.

The Western Docks area was also used from 1968 to the early 2000s for a cross-channel hovercraft service run by Hoverspeed. Hoverspeed also ran catamaran services until being declared bankrupt in 2005. Another catamaran service was run from 2004 until November 2008 by the single ship of SpeedFerries, SpeedOne, with up to five services daily to Boulogne-sur-Mer. The hoverport has now been demolished and redeveloped as a cargo handling facility.

== Infrastructure ==
The harbour is divided into two main sections, the Eastern Docks and the Western Docks, about 1 kilometre (0.62 mi) apart.

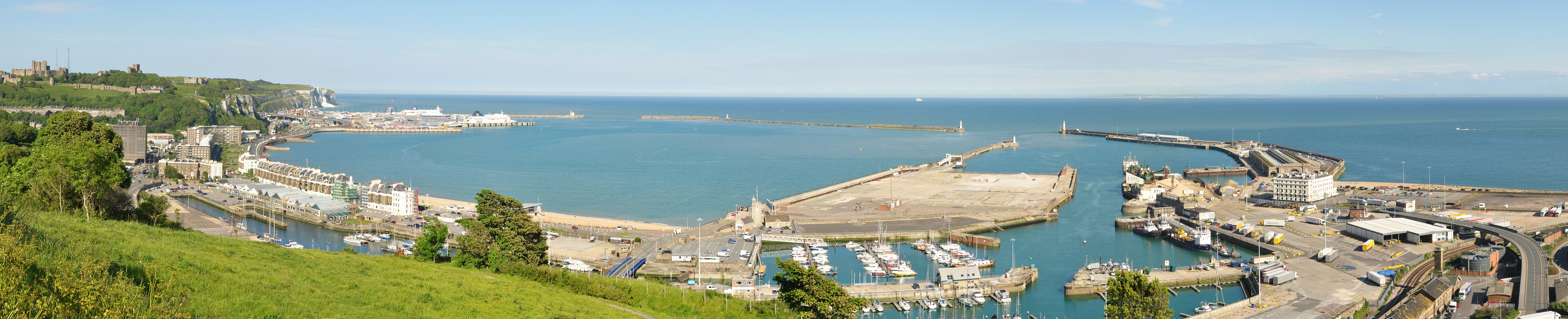
Dover harbour panorama photographed in 2012 from the Western Heights. On the left of the panorama, Dover Castle and the Eastern Docks. The Southern Breakwater is in the centre of the image. Right, the Western Docks prior to development of new cargo and marina facilities.

=== Eastern Docks ===
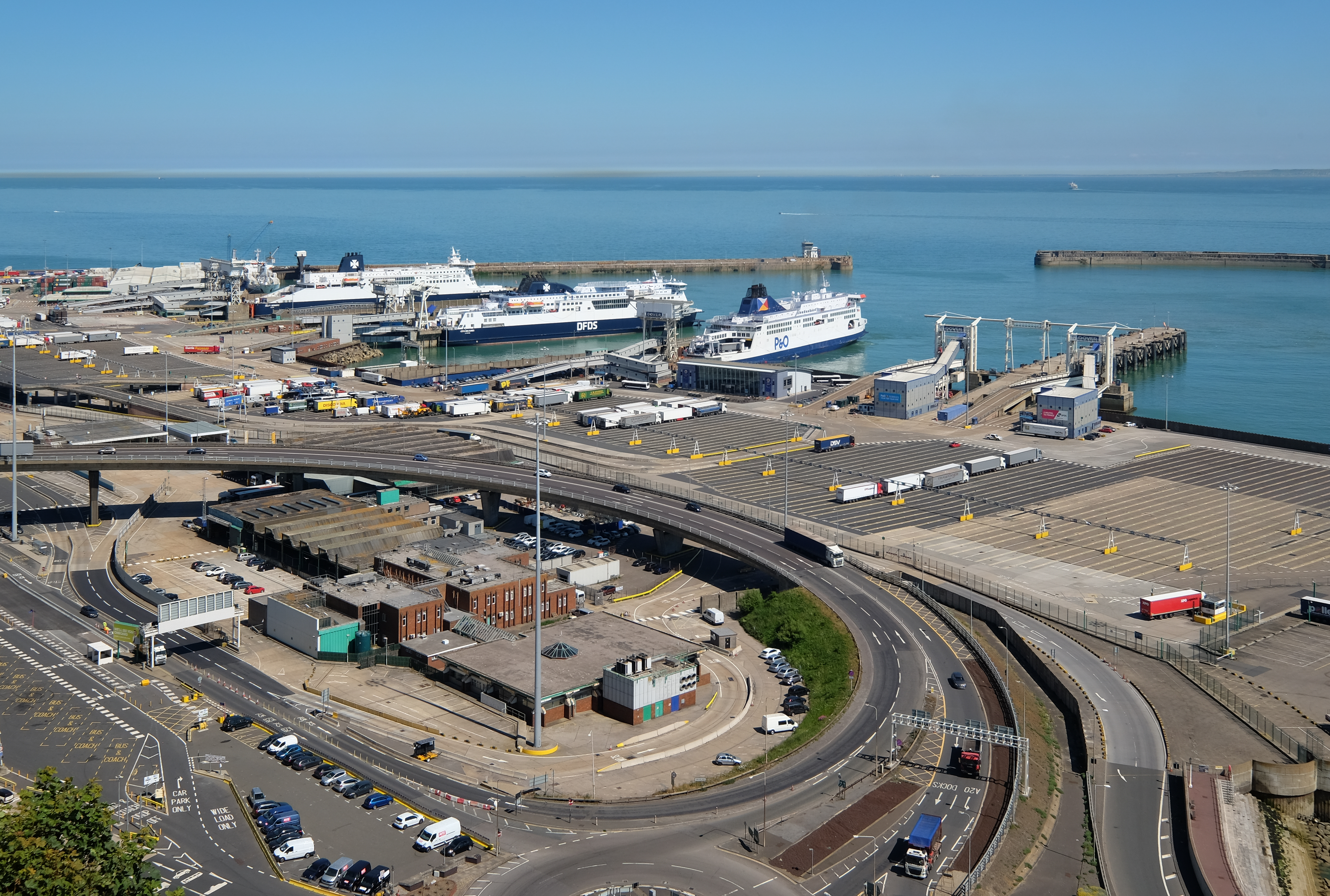
The Eastern Docks in 2018

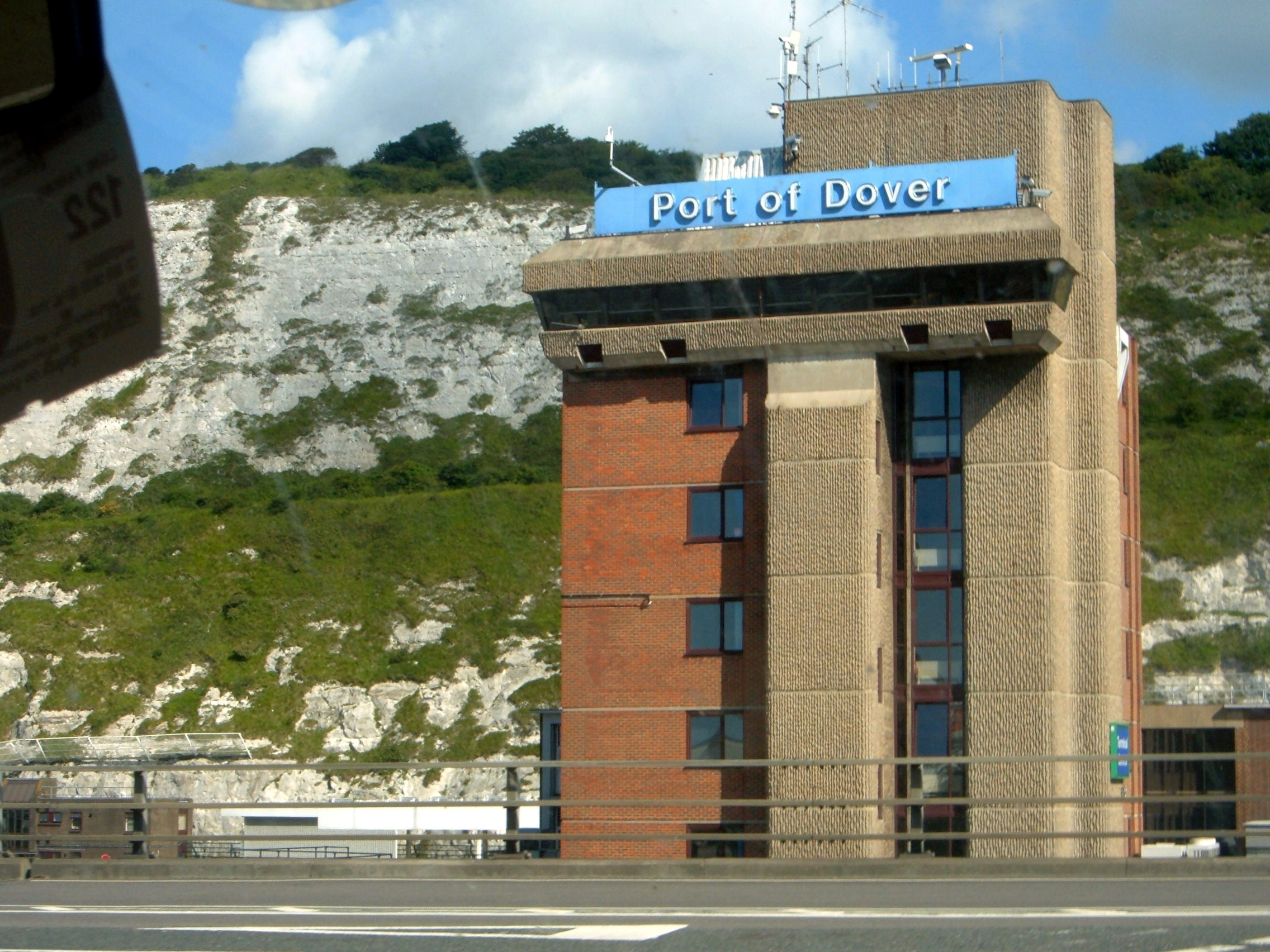
Terminal control building

Cross channel ferry services to France operate from the seven twin-level ferry berths and associated departure buildings of the Eastern Docks.

==== Ferry services ====
Operator	Destination	Fleet	Ship notes
P&O Ferries	Calais	3 vessels: Spirit of France; P&O Liberté; P&O Pioneer	
DFDS Seaways	Calais	3 vessels: Côte d'Opale; Côte des Flandres; Côte des Dunes	
DFDS Seaways	Dunkirk	3 vessels: Dunkerque Seaways; Dover Seaways; Delft Seaways	
Irish Ferries	Calais	3 vessels: Isle of Inishmore; Isle of Innisfree; Oscar Wilde	

The Eastern Docks also used to be served by the following, all now defunct:

- MyFerryLink
- LD Lines
- SeaFrance
- Norfolkline
- Stena Line
- P&O Stena Line
- Townsend Thoresen
- Normandy Ferries
- Sealink (later Sealink Stena Line) and four companies under the tag:
  - Regie voor Maritiem Transport
  - Stoomvaart Maatschappij Zeeland
  - SNCF
  - British Rail

An adjacent freight terminal (with three loading cranes) is scheduled to be repurposed under port redevelopment plans but can currently be used by ships of up to 180 metres (590 ft).

=== Western Docks ===
This part of the port is formed by the western arm of the harbour, Admiralty Pier, and its associated port facilities. Recently the focus of a £250 million port redevelopment project co-financed by the European Union.

==== Cruise ship terminal ====
Conversion and restoration of the historic former Dover Marine rail terminus, and the opening of a second, larger, cruise terminal building in 1996, have supported a significant expansion in cruise ship traffic. Cruise Terminal 2 is able to accommodate ships as large as the Celebrity Silhouette at 319 metres (1,047 ft) in length overall, a beam of 36.8 metres (121 ft) and 122,400 gross tons. The cruise ship terminal can accommodate up to three ships at any one time.

In 2019 the Port of Dover accommodated 130 cruise ship port calls and over 200,000 passengers, making it the second busiest cruise ship port in the United Kingdom after the Port of Southampton.

==== Cargo handling ====
Dover Cargo Terminal West opened in December 2019, replacing berthing and handling facilities at the Eastern Docks. Two new berths can accommodate ships of 340 metres (1,120 ft) and 240 metres (790 ft) simultaneously with a minimum quay depth of 9.5 metres (31 ft). The new purpose-built cold chain and warehousing complex is capable of handling fresh produce, containers, project cargo, general cargo, breakbulk, grain and roll-on/roll-off.

==== Marina ====
Marina facilities, primarily targeted at recreational sailing and power boating, are provided in both the historic Wellington Dock and adjacent to the cruise terminal and cargo wharves.

== Hoverport ==
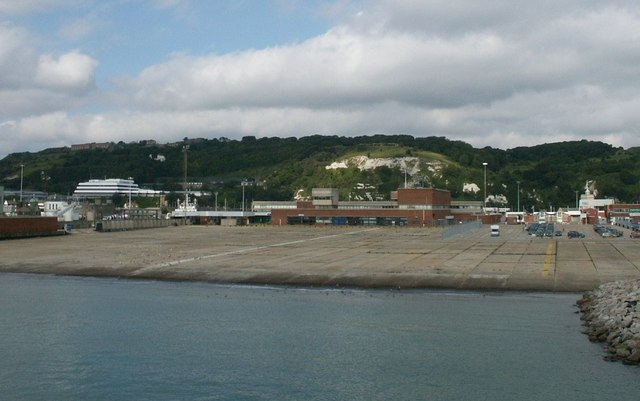
Hoverport, Dover Western Docks

Seaspeed began operating from Dover's Eastern Docks in 1968. British Rail built a new hoverport at the Western Docks, which opened for service in July 1978 (costing some £14 million compared to the original estimate of £8 million). The aim was twofold; one, to cater for the increase in the fleet capacity to four, with the prospect of two new French hovercraft entering the fleet, as well as to handle additional passenger volumes via the extended SR.N4s. Seaspeed would thus be able to compete with Hoverlloyd's operations in Pegwell Bay. two, to provide a direct rail link to London and attract business class professionals, a rail connection was envisaged, similar to that at Boulogne (Le Portel) Hoverport which had been developed in 1968. In the event, only one of the French vessels was deemed fit for purpose and it retired early in 1983, plagued by malfunctions and limitations. Moreover, the direct rail link via Dover Western Docks never materialised and a bus service ran to and from the station instead. The terminal was officially opened by the Duke of Kent in September 1981.

After the closure of Hoverspeed in 2005, the Dover Hoverport remained unused. In February 2007, SpeedFerries signed a lease on the former Dover Hoverport, though not the terminal building, moving there from the Eastern Docks. SpeedFerries went into administration in November 2008, which saw the cessation of services to Boulogne. The hoverport site was redeveloped in 2009.

== Access ==
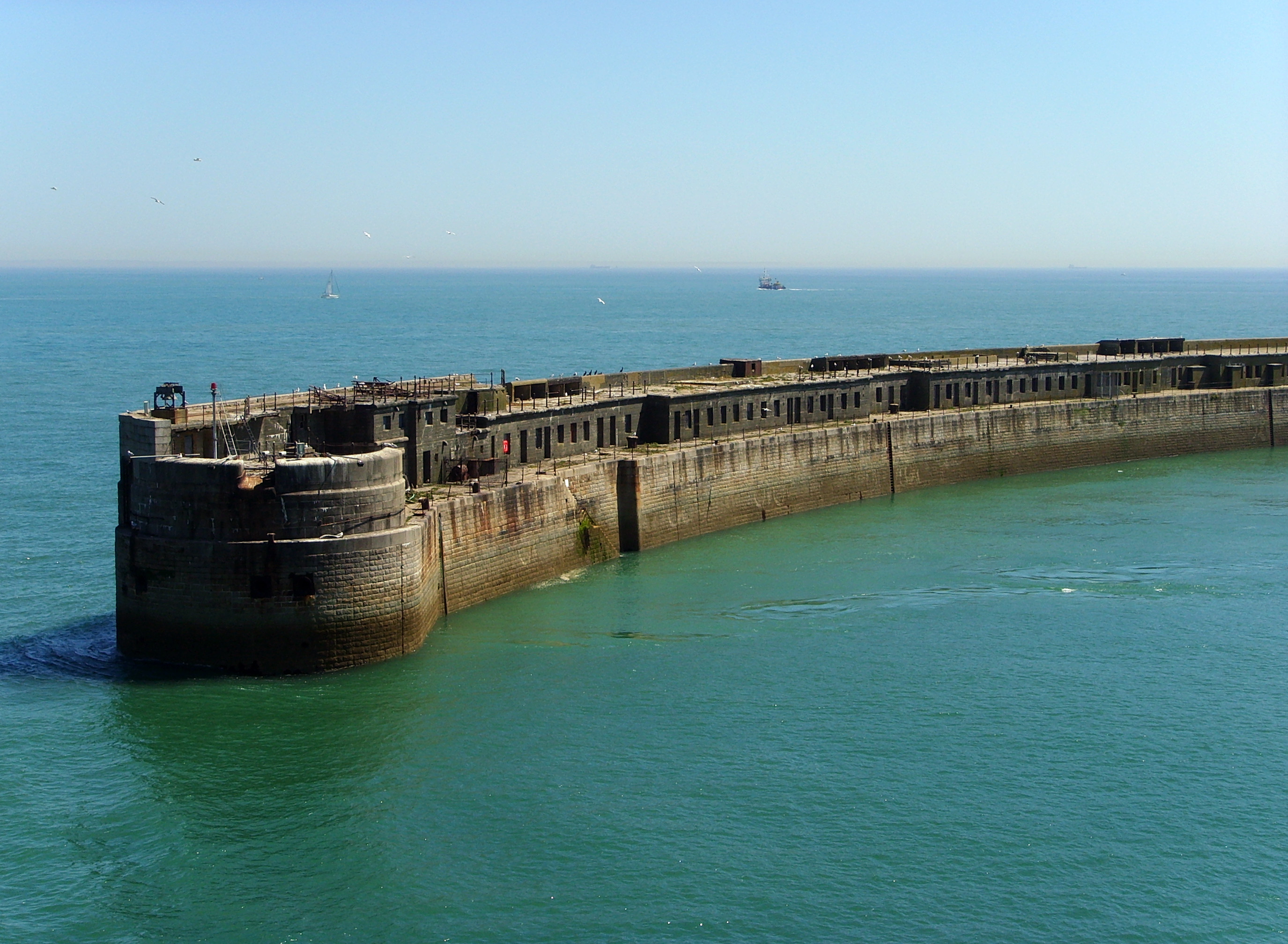
Southern Breakwater

The port is accessible by road from the M20/A20 (leading to Folkestone) and the M2/A2 (to Canterbury), and by train from Dover Priory station with Southeastern services to London St Pancras via Folkestone Central, Ashford International, Ebbsfleet International, Stratford International as well as trains to London Victoria or London Charing Cross via Canterbury East and the Medway towns such as Gillingham, Chatham and Rochester or via Ashford International then either via Tonbridge and Sevenoaks or Maidstone East. There are trains to Deal and Ramsgate.

== In media ==
A boat train at Dover Western Docks station is seen in the third episode of Inspector Morse, "Deceived by Flight", which was filmed in 1989, prior to the station's closure in November 1994.

The BBC's automotive TV programme Top Gear filmed an episode at the former hoverport, in which the presenters used amphibious cars to cross the English Channel.

== See also ==
- France–UK border
- Channel Ports
- Port of Calais

== Bibliography ==
- Biddle, Martin; Summerson, John (1982). "Dover Harbour". In Colvin, H. M. (ed.). The History of the King's Works. Vol. 4. London: HMSO. pp. 729–64. ISBN 0116708328.
- Hendy, John (1988). Sealink Dover–Calais. Staplehurst, Kent: Ferry Publications. ISBN 978-0951350614.
- Hendy, John (1991). The Dover–Ostend Line. Staplehurst, Kent: Ferry Publications. ISBN 978-0951350652.
- Hendy, John (1993). Ferries of Dover. Staplehurst, Kent: Ferry Publications. ISBN 978-0951350690.
- Hendy, John (1997). Ferry Port Dover: the development of cross-channel vehicle ferries, their services and allied infrastructure. Staplehurst, Kent: Ferry Publications. ISBN 978-1871947472.
- Hendy, John (2009). Dover–Calais: The Short-Sea Route. Ramsey, Isle of Man: Ferry Publications. ISBN 9781871947939.
- Hendy, John (2011). Ferries of Dover: Through Five Decades 1960–2011. Ramsey, Isle of Man: Ferry Publications. ISBN 9781906608187.
- Hendy, John (2016). Dover-Calais. Ramsey, Isle of Man: Ferry Publications. ISBN 9781906608743.
- Minet, William (1922). "Some unpublished plans of Dover Harbour". Archaeologia. 72: 185–224. doi:10.1017/S0261340900009693.
- Paterson, J. D. (1894). By Dover and Calais from early times to the present day. Dover: Printed at the "King's Arms" Printing Works. OCLC 12041086.
- Pattheeuws, Steven (2015). The Ostend Ferry: from start to finish. Ramsey, Isle of Man: Ferry Publications. ISBN 9781906608804.
