= MS Norsky =

Ship

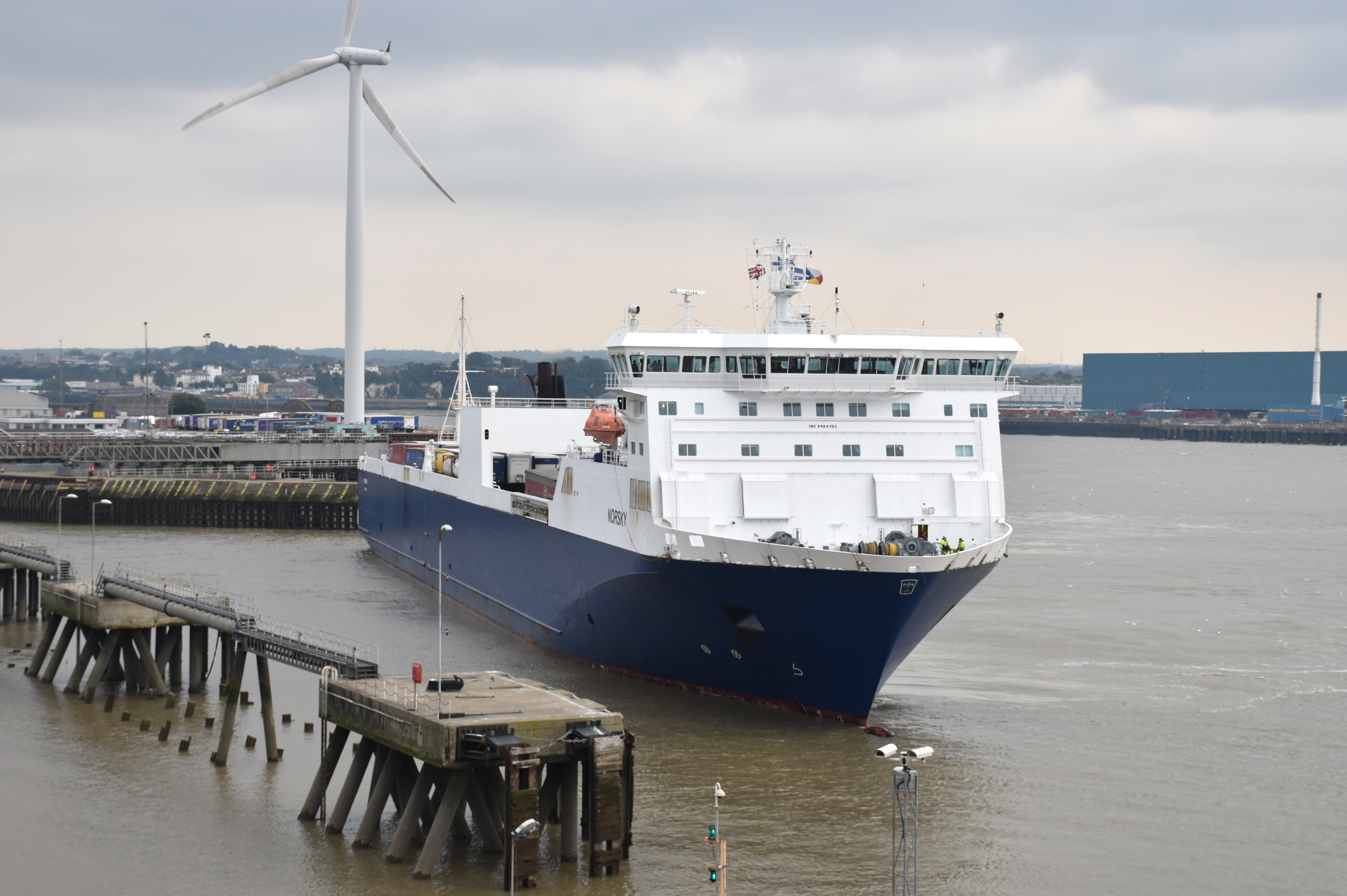
- Norsky arriving at Tilbury

History
- Name: Norsky
- Owner: Bore (1999–present)
- Operator: P&O Ferries (1999–present)
- Port of registry: 1999: Rotterdam, Netherlands; 2015: Helsinki, Finland
- Route: Tilbury-Zeebrugge
- Ordered: 1999
- Builder: Aker Finnyards, Finland
- Yard number: 424
- Laid down: 4 September 1998
- Launched: 26 March 1999
- Completed: 29 June 1999
- Maiden voyage: July 1999
- Identification: IMO number: 9186182; Call sign: PCCC (1999-2015); Call sign: OJRB (2015-present)
- Status: In service

General characteristics
- Type: Cargo ro-ro ferry
- Tonnage: 20,296 GT; 11,585 DWT
- Length: 180 m (590 ft 7 in)
- Beam: 26 m (85 ft 4 in)
- Propulsion: Two medium-speed Wärtsilä NSD 46-series C nine-cylinder engines.(9,450 kW at 500 rpm); Two pitch propellers

Norsky is a ro-ro cargo ferry owned by Bore and operated by P&O Ferries with sister ship Norstream on the Tilbury-Zeebrugge route.

== History ==
Norsky was built by Aker Finnyards in Rauma, Finland. She was laid down on 4 September 1998, launched on 26 March 1999 and completed on 29 June 1999.
