= MS Norcape =

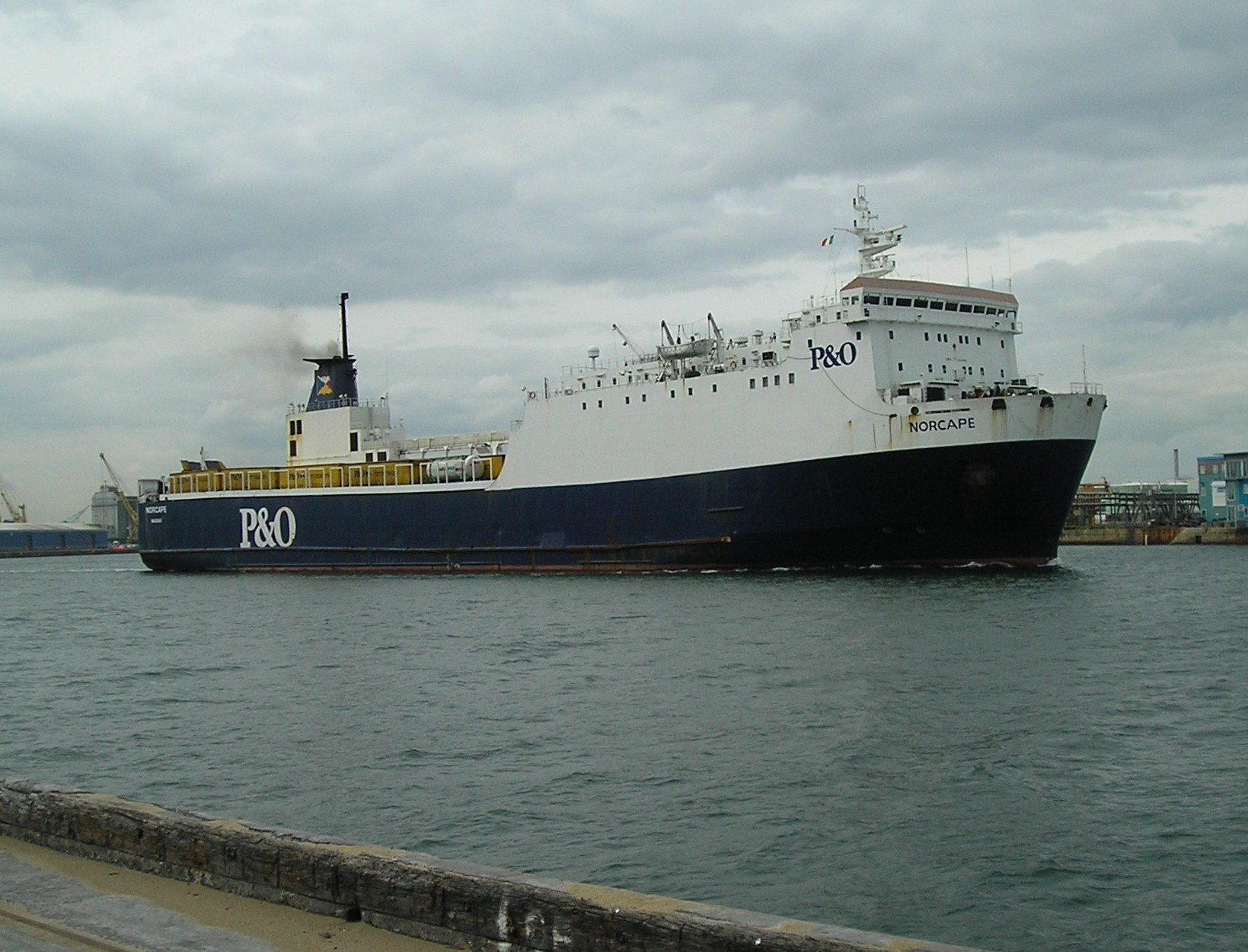
- "Norcape" sailing from Dublin 17-5-10

History
- Name: Puma (1979); Tipperary (1979 - 1989); Norcape (1989 Onwards)
- Owner: P&O Ferries (1979 - 1989); Norcape Shipping BV (1989 Onwards)
- Operator: B&I Line (1979 - 1989); North Sea Ferries (1989 - 1996); P&O North Sea Ferries (1996 - 2002); P&O Ferries (2002 - 2008); P&O Irish Sea (2008); P&O Ferries (2008 - 2010); P&O Irish Sea (2010); P&O Ferries (2010 - 2011)
- Port of registry: Nassau, Bahamas
- Route: Liverpool to Dublin
- Builder: Mitsui Engineering & Shipbuilding, Tamano, Japan
- Yard number: 1164
- Launched: 20 April 1979
- Identification: IMO number: 7716086; MMSI number: 311039600
- Fate: Sold for scrapping 2011

General characteristics
- Tonnage: 14,087 GT
- Length: 150.02 metres (492.2 ft)
- Beam: 20.73 metres (68.0 ft)
- Draft: 5.1 metres (17 ft)
- Installed power: 2x Mitsui 12V42M
- Speed: 19.4 knots (22.3 mph)
- Capacity: 1,500 lanemetres; 12 berths

MS Norcape was a ro-ro freight vessel built for the British ferry company P&O Ferries. She was built in 1979 by Mitsui Engineering & Shipbuilding, Japan as Puma. Later that year, she was renamed Tipperary and began service with B&I Line, operating between Liverpool and Dublin. After 10 years she was transferred to P&O North Sea Ferries and renamed as Norcape. She was laid up in Liverpool in 2010 before going to refit and transferring to the Larne Troon route. She was sold for scrap following a grounding in Troon and cut up in Aliağa, Turkey.
