= MS Norstream =

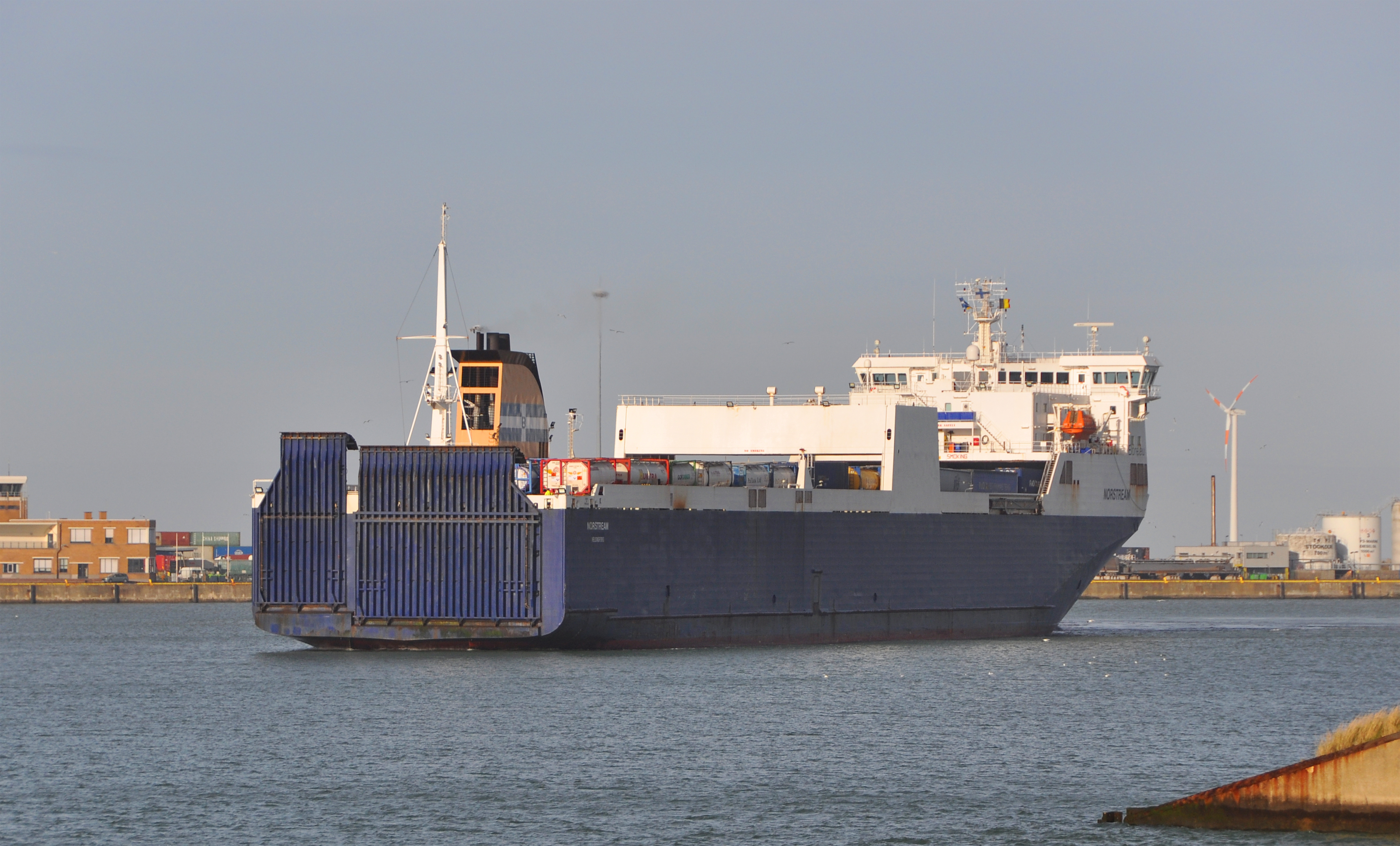
- MS Norstream backing to the berth in the port of Zeebrugge

History
- Name: Norstream (1999–present)
- Owner: Bore sky (1999–present)
- Operator: P&O North Sea Ferries (1999–2002); P&O Ferries (2002–present)
- Port of registry: Rotterdam, Netherlands
- Route: Tilbury–Zeebrugge
- Ordered: 1999
- Builder: Aker Finnyards, Finland
- Launched: 2 July 1999
- Maiden voyage: September 1999
- Identification: IMO number: 9186194
- Status: In service

General characteristics
- Type: Cargo ro-ro ferry
- Tonnage: 20,296 GT; 11,585 DWT
- Length: 180 m (590 ft 7 in)
- Beam: 26 m (85 ft 4 in)

MS Norstream is a cargo ferry owned by the Bore Ltd subsidiary company Bore Sky and operated by P&O Ferries with sister ship MS Norsky on the Tilbury–Zeebrugge route.

== History ==
Norstream was built in 1999 for Bore Ltd for time-charter to the now defunct P&O North Sea Ferries which has since been incorporated into P&O Ferries. As a ro-ro freight ferry she does not carry tourist passengers but does have capacity for 12 freight drivers which are accommodated in six two berth cabins. She is powered by two 9,450 kW (12,670 hp) Wärtsilä-NSD marine diesel engines and carries a crew of 14.

Since entering service during 1999, Norstream and sister ship Norsky have operated mainly on the up to twice daily freight service between Tilbury and Zeebrugge. Norstream and her sister-ship have capacity for up to 2,630 lane meters of freight across three decks. Her main deck has a clear height of 7 m (23 ft 0 in) and can accommodate double-stacked containers, while her tank top and weather deck have a clear height of five metres. On the weather deck this restriction is imposed by the height above the internal ramp from the main deck as well as the amount of clearance under the accommodation module, though the vessel is equipped with a shore ramp on the weather deck as well as the main deck ramp which she normally loads with. Norstream was built as a stern only loading vessel which means she has to back on to her berth at all ports. When docked in Zeebrugge she was (till December 2020) docked next to one of her P&O fleet-mates, Pride of Bruges or Pride of York.

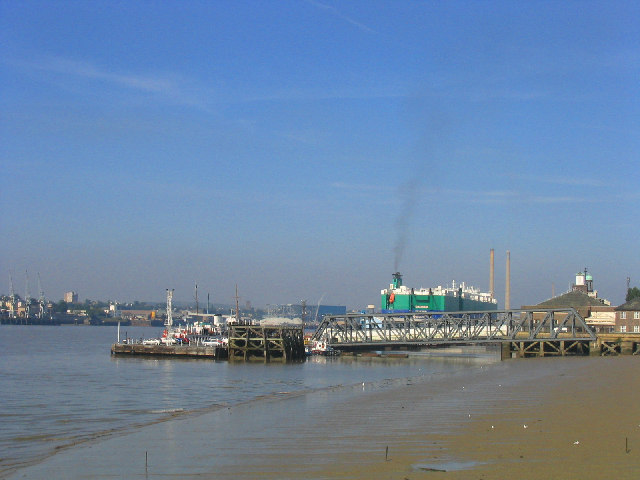
The Tilbury dock where Norstream docks
