= P&O Ferries =

British ferry company

- Type: Private
- Industry: Transport
- Predecessor: P&O; Townsend Thoresen; P&O European Ferries; P&O Irish Sea; P&O Portsmouth; P&O North Sea; P&O Scottish Ferries
- Founded: 2002
- Headquarters: Dover, England
- Key people: Kasper Moos, CEO
- Services: Ferries; Port services; Passenger transportation; Freight transportation
- Parent: DP World ( since 2019 )
- Website: www.poferries.com

P&O Ferries is a British shipping company that operates ferries from Scotland to Northern Ireland, and from England to Continental Europe (France, Belgium and the Netherlands). The company was created in 2002 through mergers and acquisitions within P&O. It has been owned by Dubai-based DP World since 2019.

== History ==
=== 1960s–1989 ===
P&O originally established ferry services in the late 1960s in the North Sea between Hull and Rotterdam and the English Channel between Southampton and Le Havre. In the late 1970s P&O was affected by a reduction in traditional shipping activities which saw the sale of a number of its businesses and assets. This continued into 1985 with the sale of its cross-channel ferry activities to European Ferries, which at the time consisted of services on the Dover–Boulogne and Portsmouth–Le Havre routes the latter having transferred from Southampton in December 1984.

In January the following year, P&O purchased a 50.01% interest in European Financial Holdings, which held 20.8% of shares in European Ferries, followed in 1987 with the purchase of the remaining shares of the European Ferries Group whose ferry services were trading as Townsend Thoresen. Following the Herald of Free Enterprise disaster in March 1987, the operations of Townsend Thoresen were renamed P&O European Ferries on 22 October 1987, with operations from Portsmouth, Felixstowe and Dover.

=== 1990–2019 ===
Following a consultation with the Competition Commission beginning 28 November 1996, P&O European Ferries split into three separate subsidiaries: P&O Portsmouth, P&O North Sea and the creation of a joint venture between P&O and the Swedish ferry company Stena Line's UK subsidiary Stena Line (UK) Ltd to create P&O Stena Line in Dover.

In April 2002, P&O announced its intention to purchase Stena Line's 40% share of the joint venture. The purchase was completed by August, and in October 2002 the Portsmouth and North Sea operations were merged with the Dover operations to create P&O Ferries Ltd, jointly managing all services from its head office, Channel House in Dover.

In September 2004, P&O Ferries Ltd conducted a business review that concluded with the announcement of closure of several of its long-term Portsmouth-based routes, leaving only the Portsmouth – Bilbao route in operation. These closures were predominantly blamed on the expansion of low-cost airlines and the increasing usage of the Channel Tunnel as a faster alternative to ferry operations.

In 2006, the P&O Group, including P&O Ferries was sold to Dubai-based DP World. Shortly afterwards it was taken over by Dubai World.

On 15 January 2010, P&O Ferries announced that it would be closing the Portsmouth–Bilbao route by the end of September to coincide with the end of its existing charter for Pride of Bilbao. This meant the closure of the final route served by P&O Ferries in Portsmouth.

In January 2019, P&O Ferries announced that its UK fleet would be reflagged from Dover, UK to Limassol, Cyprus in response to the United Kingdom's exit from the European Union in 2019 "For operational and accounting reasons". Cyprus is a member of the EU and a flag of convenience, with the reflagging allowing P&O to continue to benefit from EU tax arrangements. According to the Rail, Maritime and Transport union, the reflagging was "pure opportunism", saying that the firm's "long-term aim has always been to switch the UK fleet to a tax haven register".

On 20 February 2019, DP World announced it had repurchased P&O Ferries from Dubai World in a £322 million deal.

=== Since 2020 ===
==== 2022 staff sacking ====
On 17 March 2022, P&O abruptly suspended its operations, cancelling all sailings and offloading passengers and cargo. Eight hundred UK staff were told in a video call that their employment was "terminated with immediate effect due to redundancy", and that their work would in future be undertaken by staff contracted to a third-party supplier. Staff on some ferries refused to leave their vessels. A spokesman for the National Union of Rail, Maritime and Transport Workers said that there had been no consultation with the staff or trade unions. The chair of the Transport Select Committee, Huw Merriman MP, criticised P&O. In the light of this action by P&O Ferries, the UK government stated it would review its contracts with the company. This resulted in calls to boycott P&O Ferries including by members of the public, businesses in the travel trade and politicians.

The method of the expulsion, overseen by ex-military security guards, was criticised by several government and business leaders. Mark Russell, a non-executive director of DP World, resigned afterwards in disagreement with the way in which the restructuring was carried out. P&O Ferries had seen losses during the COVID-19 pandemic as well as deficits in its pension fund. Industry sources also cited its high overheads and competition from Irish Ferries as potential contributory factors. Verity Slater, partner and expert in maritime employment law at Stephens Scown, said that P&O may not have to follow UK employment laws, since some of its ships are not registered in Britain.

On 24 March 2022, P&O Ferries CEO Peter Hebblethwaite confirmed before the Transport Select Committee of MPs that the management of the company acted unlawfully when it fired the crew members without consultation. Grant Shapps said that P&O Ferries should change the names of Spirit of Britain, Pride of Hull, Pride of Kent and Pride of Canterbury to remove all British references, were it found that P&O had broken the law. Shapps confirmed that the ships concerned would only be able to operate following full training and subsequent inspection by the Maritime and Coastguard Agency.

In March 2022, Shapps wrote to Hebblethwaite to give him "one final opportunity" to reinstate the 800 workers. Hebblethwaite declined to do so and confirmed his intention to remain in the CEO post despite two of the company's ships being impounded on safety grounds.

The controversy also caused P&O Cruises, another company originally owned by P&O but which was divested in 2000 and acquired by Carnival Corporation & plc in 2003, to suffer public backlash and to embark on an advertising campaign to clarify their separate ownership from P&O Ferries.

On 25 April 2022, it was reported that P&O Ferries was forced to reverse its attempt at pay cuts for the new workers. National Union of Rail, Maritime and Transport Workers, also known as RMT Union, received reports of seafarers being asked to sign new contracts with reduced payment. The union reported the company to the Maritime and Coastguard Agency, which made sure that the wages were not reduced. In November 2024, The Guardian reported that P&O Ferries' actions in 2022 cost the business £47 million.

=== Other brands ===
Over the years P&O Ferries operated various subsidiary ferry companies, each with their own distinctive name, these included:

- Pandoro Ltd and Ferrymasters Ltd
- P&O Irish Sea
- P&O European Ferries
- P&O Portsmouth
- P&O North Sea Ferries
- P&O Stena Line (joint venture).

P&O Portsmouth was formed in 1999 when P&O European Ferries Portsmouth Operations were named after the merger of the Dover Operations with Stena Line to make P&O Stena Line, when in 2002 P&O bought Stena's 20% share in P&O Stena Line so the North Sea Operations and the Portsmouth operations were merged with the Dover Operations to make P&O Ferries.

== Operations ==
Throughout its history, P&O Ferries has operated in five main areas, centred around Dover, Portsmouth, Southampton, the Irish Sea and the North Sea.

=== Dover ===
P&O began ferry operations in Dover in 1976 with a route to Boulogne in France under the Normandy Ferries brand using the ferry MV Lion which had previously served on the former Burns & Laird Line route between Ardrossan and Belfast. Burns & Laird Line was part of the P&O Group at the time. P&O Normandy Ferries eventually supplemented the Dover-Boulogne route with the twin sisters MV Panther and MV Tiger, both former Danish ferries. The Dover-Boulogne route was sold to European Ferries on 4 January 1985 which rebranded them, along with its Southampton–Le Havre route, as Normandy Ferries Ltd. Following the purchase of European Ferries, P&O operated routes from Dover to Calais in France and Zeebrugge in Belgium, initially trading under the Townsend Thoresen brand; however, due to the bad publicity that the Herald of Free Enterprise disaster brought to that brand in March 1987, the services were subsequently rebranded to P&O European Ferries, with most vessels named with the prefix Pride of.

Prior to the acquisition, European Ferries had ordered two purpose-built vessels for the Dover–Calais route. These were delivered in June and December 1987 as Pride of Dover and Pride of Calais, taking on the role of flagships for P&O European Ferries. P&O's Dover operations remained largely unchanged until 1998 when they were merged with Stena Lines Dover and Newhaven operations to form P&O Stena Line (P&OSL) in response to the increased competition from the Channel Tunnel which opened in 1994 and the coming end to duty-free shopping within the EU in July 1999. As a result, vessels were renamed from the recognisable Pride of prefix to instead be prefixed with P&OSL in 1999. P&OSL operated eleven vessels, eight of which provided a freight and passenger service on the Dover–Calais route and the remaining three a freight service on the Dover–Zeebrugge route.

In August 2002, P&O acquired Stena Line's 40% share of P&OSL, which were re-merged with the Portsmouth and North Sea operations under the P&O Ferries brand. In December 2002, the Dover–Zeebrugge route closed, leaving only the Dover–Calais route remaining. Vessel prefixes were again changed to PO before they were repainted into a new livery and then resuming the use of the Pride of prefix in 2003.

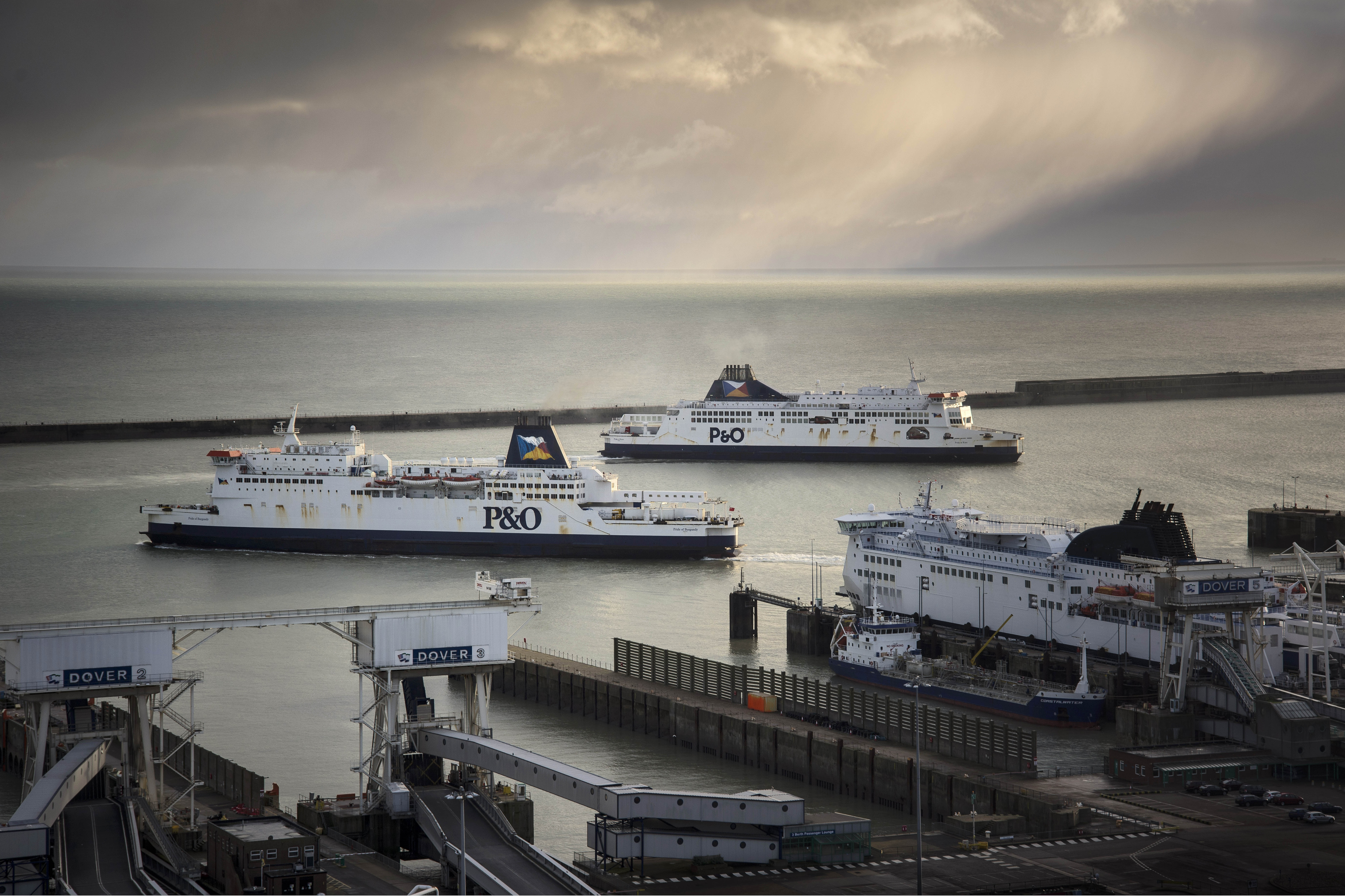
Pride of Burgundy and Pride of Kent in Dover Harbour.

On 8 August 2008, P&O Ferries announced it had placed a €360 million order with STX Europe for two new ships to replace the ageing Pride of Dover and Pride of Calais. The two new vessels, Spirit of Britain and Spirit of France, are 49,000 gross tons and 210 metres long, making them the largest ferries to operate in the English Channel. They were the first passenger ferries in the world to comply with the new SOLAS "Safe Return to Port" requirements.

Spirit of Britain entered service on 21 January 2011 replacing Pride of Dover, which remained in layup in Tilbury before being sold and scrapped in late 2012. Spirit of France entered service on 9 February 2012. Pride of Calais remained in service primarily as a freight ferry to cope with demand following the collapse of SeaFrance, before being withdrawn on 20 October 2012 and subsequently chartered to TransEuropa Ferries although this charter was somewhat short lived and Pride of Calais subsequently followed her sister, Pride of Dover, to the scrapyard and she was beached in Turkey in late 2013

New hybrid ships with 8.8 MWh battery and 4 7.5 MW motors are planned to enter service (EIS) on the Dover-Calais route by 2023. These ships will be the first double-ended ferries to operate the Dover-Calais service. They will be the world's largest double-ended ferries, with a length of 230 metres, even larger than the Spirit-class ships. On 21 December 2020, it was announced that the keels for the first three ships in the new class were laid, with the following delivery dates scheduled for the first two: 23 September 2022 and 23 March 2023. On 2 January 2022, the first ship of the class was launched and a few days later, the names of the two new ships were announced as P&O Pioneer and P&O Liberté.

=== Portsmouth ===
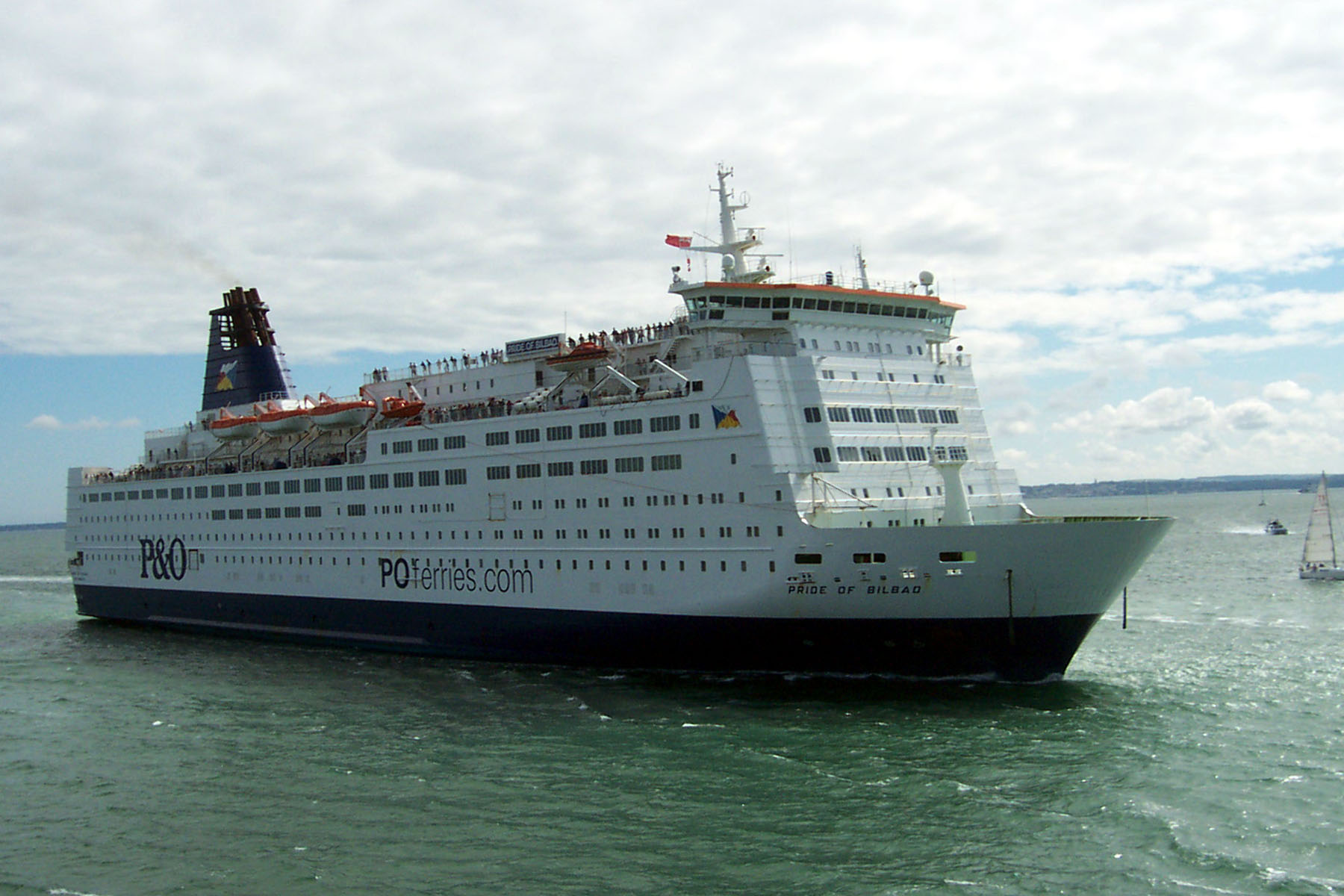
Pride of Bilbao, an archetypical cruise ferry. Built for Viking Line and operated by P&O Ferries between Portsmouth in the UK and Bilbao in Spain from 1993 to 2010.

In summer 2004 P&O Ferries operated a Portsmouth–Caen route using the Incat 91 model catamaran Max Mols from Mols-Linien, trading under the name Caen Express. However, this was short lived, with P&O Ferries announcing on 28 September 2004 its planned closure of the Portsmouth–Cherbourg and Caen routes and the transfer of the Portsmouth–Le Havre route to Brittany Ferries due to falling passenger numbers and rising costs. Caen Express was returned to Mols-Linien in October 2004, and the Portsmouth–Cherbourg route closed on 14 January 2005. Following the intervention of the Office of Fair Trading and the Competition Commission, Brittany Ferries backed out of the deal to take over the Le Havre route, so Portsmouth–Le Havre remained under P&O Ferries until its closure on 30 September 2005.

The Bilbao route remained as the only Portsmouth operation, until on 15 January 2010, P&O Ferries announced they would withdraw the service at the end of Pride of Bilbao's charter. The vessel completed her final voyage on 28 September 2010 and was returned to Irish Continental Group, from whom she had been chartered since the route's inception.

=== North Sea ===
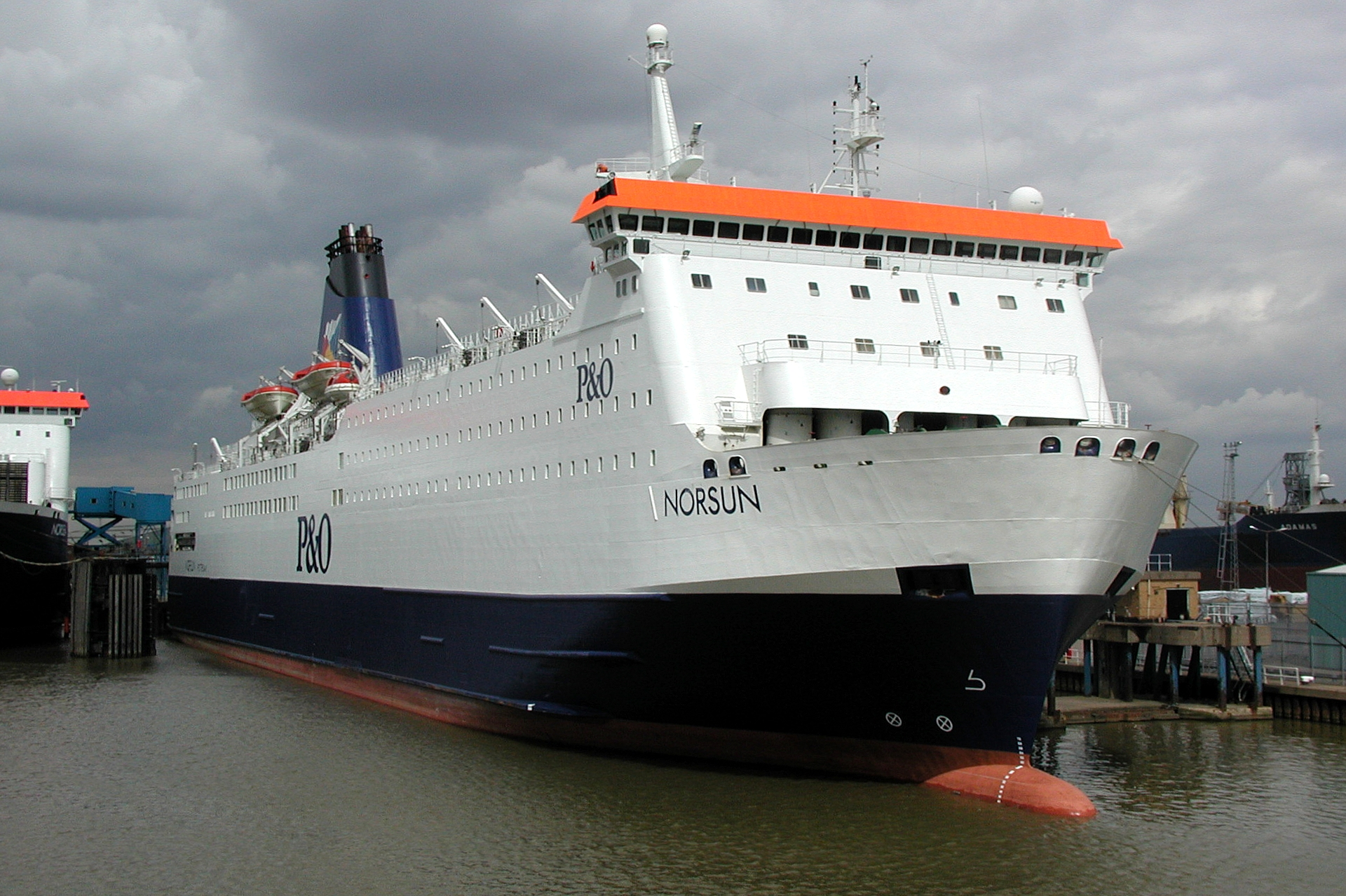
The Norsun at her regular berth in Hull, 2001.

P&O's involvement in the North Sea ferry routes began with a 35% stake in North Sea Ferries owned by its subsidiary General Steam Navigation Company. North Sea Ferries had begun operations on 17 December 1965 sailing on the Hull–Rotterdam route, a route which critics predicted would not survive. The numbers proved them wrong, however, and in the first year, 54,000 passengers were carried. By 1974, demand for capacity was greater than could be supplied, and two vastly bigger vessels, Norland and Norstar, which were at that time the largest ferries in the world, were introduced to the route.

The two vessels Norwind and Norwave were transferred to a new route, Hull–Zeebrugge, operating a nightly service departing 30 minutes after the Rotterdam service sailed. The two routes remained unchanged, with the exception of the Ministry of Defence chartering Norland for service with the British Task Force to the Falkland Islands in 1982. The two routes were becoming increasingly popular, and in 1987 the larger Norsun and Norsea were introduced on the Hull–Rotterdam route, the two displaced vessels moving to Hull–Zeebrugge and the sale of both Norwind and Norwave.

As part of the success of the routes, dedicated freight routes were introduced from Teesport to both Rotterdam and Zeebrugge on a nightly basis. However, the ships quickly began to struggle to cope with demand, and in 1994 new superfreighters were introduced on the Hull routes. A new river berth was therefore constructed to accommodate the freight only vessels, however they were still small enough to pass through the lock at King George Dock if required.

By 1996 P&O owned a 50% stake in North Sea Ferries, the other 50% owned by Royal Nedlloyd Group. In a multimillion-pound deal, P&O purchased Royal Nedlloyd Group's stake, and North Sea Ferries was rebranded to P&O North Sea Ferries. Continuing success saw the purchase of two new superferries weighing 60,000 tonnes from Fincantieri, entering service in 2001 as Pride of Rotterdam and Pride of Hull and once again holding the title of 'world's largest ferry'. Norsea and Norsun were refitted and returned to P&O North Sea Ferries on the Hull–Zeebrugge route as Pride of York and Pride of Bruges.

Following P&O's acquisition of P&O Stena Line in 2002, P&O North Sea Ferries was merged and rebranded with P&O's Portsmouth and Dover operations under the current P&O Ferries Ltd name.

P&O Ferries host many themed minicruises on the Hull to Rotterdam route. These include the now traditional 'Hulloween' minicruise on 28 October and music minicruises with 50s and 60s music.

=== Irish Sea ===
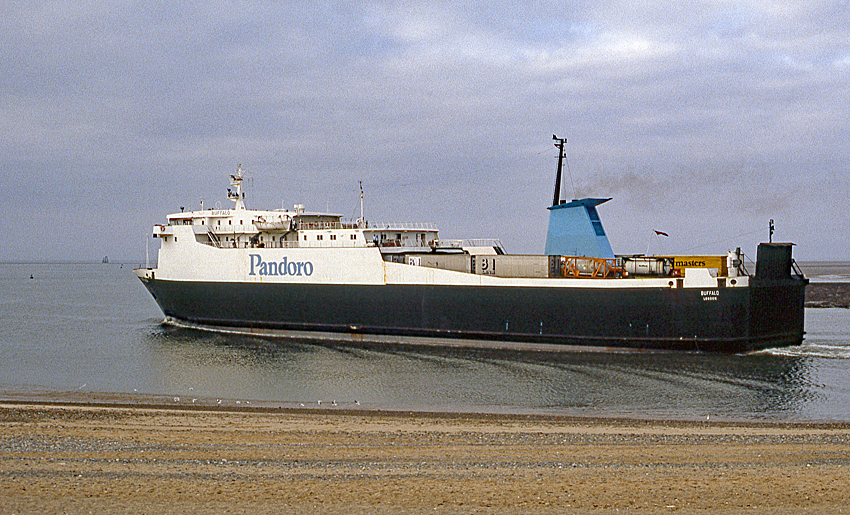
Pandoro ferry Buffalo leaving Fleetwood

In 1971 P&O purchased the remains of Coast Lines which had been operating in the Irish Sea since 1913. In December 1974, P&O founded Pandoro Ltd to provide transport operations to Ireland. A number of different routes were started and ceased operating as the 'Troubles' affected the car/passenger market to Northern Ireland.

In 1993 Pandoro added a service operating between Rosslare, Ireland, and Cherbourg, France, to its Ardrossan–Larne, Liverpool–Dublin and Fleetwood–Dublin routes.

P&O Irish Sea was formed in 1998, following the merger of the Cairnryan-based service of P&O European Ferries (Felixstowe) Ltd and Pandoro Ltd (who operated routes between England, Scotland and France to Ireland). The following year (1999), the new P&O Irish Sea announced its intentions to purchase a purpose-built Ro-Pax (roll-on, roll-off, vehicle/passenger) vessel from Mitsubishi of Japan for the Liverpool to Dublin route. This would see the transfer of European Leader (ex Buffalo) back to the Fleetwood route.

In January 2016, it was announced that the seasonal Troon to Larne service would cease with immediate effect due to the unprofitability of the route. The service had ended for the 2015 season in September of that year.

== Current fleet ==
Name	Built	Route(s)	Gross Tonnage	Port of Registry	Image
Norsky	April 1999	Tilbury–Rotterdam (Chartered)	19,992	Helsinki, Finland	
Norstream	September 1999	Tilbury–Rotterdam (Chartered)	19,992	Helsinki, Finland	
Freya	May 2000	Hull-Zeebrugge (Chartered LoLo)	5,067	Rotterdam, Netherlands	
European Causeway	July 2000	Cairnryan–Larne (2000 - )	20,646	Nassau, Bahamas	
Pride of Rotterdam	September 2000	Hull–Rotterdam (2001 - )	59,925	Rotterdam, Netherlands	
Pride of Hull	April 2001	Hull–Rotterdam (2001 - )	59,925	Nassau, Bahamas	
European Highlander	May 2002	Cairnryan–Larne (2002 - )	21,188	Nassau, Bahamas	
Spirit of France	January 2012	Dover–Calais (2012 - )	49,000	Limassol, Cyprus	
Longstone	March 2019	Tilbury–Zeebrugge (2024 - (Chartered))	32,936	Rotterdam, Netherlands	
P&O Pioneer	February 2023	Dover–Calais (2023 - )	47,394	Limassol, Cyprus	
P&O Liberté	November 2023	Dover–Calais (2024 - )	47,394	Limassol, Cyprus	

== Former fleet ==
Name	Built	Service	Route(s)	Gross Tonnage	Fate	Image
Buffalo	1975	1975–2004	Fleetwood–Larne (freight); Dover–Boulogne (freight)	3,484 (as built); 10,987 (from 1988); 12,879 (from 1998)	Renamed European Leader in 1998. Sold to Stena Line, 2004. Scrapped at Aliağa in 2014.	
European Mariner	October 1977	1993–2011	Larne-Ardrossan (freight); Larne-Troon (freight)	5,897	Renamed Lion in 1995, European Highlander in 1998, European Mariner in 2001. Scrapped at Aliağa in 2011, Replaced by MS Norcape.	
MS Norcape	1979	1979–2011	Hull-Zeebrugge; Tilbury-Zeebrugge (freight); Liverpool-Dublin; Larne-Troon (freight)	14,087	Scrapped at Aliağa in 2011.	
Norking	1980	1991–2011	Middlesbrough-Rotterdam/Zeebrugge (freight); Tilbury-Zeebrugge (freight)	17,884	Sold to Salamis Lines, Greece and renamed MV Alios.	
Norqueen	1980	1991–2013	Middlesbrough-Rotterdam/Zeebrugge (freight); Tilbury-Zeebrugge (freight)	17,884	Operating in Philippines as MV Super Shuttle RoRo 9.	
Pride of Bilbao	1986	1993–2010	Portsmouth-Bilbao; Portsmouth-Cherbourg	37,799	Chartered from Irish Continental Group, sold to St. Peter Line and renamed SPL Princess Anastasia.	
Pride of York	September 1986	1986–2021	Hull-Zeebrugge	31,785	Built as Norsea, renamed in 2003. Sold for scrap at Aliağa.	
Pride of Bruges	September 1986	1986–2021	Hull-Rotterdam; Hull-Zeebrugge	31,598	Built as Norsun, renamed in 2003. Sold to Grandi Navi Veloci April 2021, renamed GNV Antares.	
Pride of Dover	1987	1987–2010	Dover-Calais	26,433	Replaced by MS Spirit of Britain and Laid up in Tilbury until 2012. Scrapped at Aliağa.	
Pride of Calais	1987	1987–2012	Dover-Calais	26,433	Replaced by MS Spirit of France, Spent three months with Transeuropa Ferries as MV Ostend Spirit and Scrapped at Aliağa in 2013.	
Pride of Portsmouth	1989	1994–2005	Portsmouth-Le Havre	33,336	Sold to SNAV, renamed SNAV Lazio.	
Pride of Le Havre	1989	1994–2005	Portsmouth-Le Havre	33,336	Sold to SNAV, renamed SNAV Sardegna.	
European Seaway	October 1991	1991–2021	Dover-Calais	22,986	Sold to Sea Lines renamed Sea Anatolia.	
Pride of Aquitaine	1991	1998 - 2005	Dover-Zeebrugge; Dover-Calais	28,833	From Stena Line named Stena Royal. Named P&OSL Aquitaine between 1999 and 2003. Chartered and then sold to LD Lines. Now Isle of Innisfree with Irish Ferries.	
Pride of Canterbury	June 1992	1992–2023	Dover-Calais	30,365	Built as European Pathway, renamed in 2003. Sold for scrap at Aliağa	
Pride of Kent	June 1992	1992–2023	Dover-Calais	30,365	Built as European Highway, renamed in 2003. Sold for scrap at Aliağa	
Pride of Burgundy	March 1993	1993–2023	Dover-Calais	28,138	Sold for scrap at Aliağa	
Norbank	October 1993	1993 - 2025	Tilbury–Rotterdam	17,464	Sold to DP World as DP World Express	
Norbay	February 1994	1994-2026	Hull–Rotterdam (1994 - 2001); Liverpool-Dublin (2002 - 2023); Tilbury–Zeebrugge (2024 - ??)	17,464	Chartered to Brittany Ferries	
Express	May 1998	2005–2015	Larne–Troon/Cairnryan	5,902	Laid up in Landskrona, Sweden.	
Mistral	August 1999	2014 - 2019	Teesport-Zeebrugge; Teesport-Harwich; Liverpool–Dublin	10,471	Chartered from Godby Shipping.	
European Endeavour	September 2000	2000–2019	Liverpool–Dublin	22,152	Sold to Eckerö Line May 2019, renamed Finbo Cargo.	
Spirit of Britain	June 2010	2010–2024	Dover-Calais	49,000	Chartered to Irish ferries as Oscar Wilde.	
Wilhelmine	July 2012		Middlesbrough–Rotterdam	16,342	Chartered in	

== Routes ==
P&O Ferries has operated the following routes:

=== Passenger / freight routes ===
- Ardrossan–Larne (1970–2001) – transferred to Troon
- Dover–Calais – operated by Townsend Thoresen until 1987
- Dover–Boulogne (1965–1993)
- Dover–Zeebrugge (1987–1991) – operated by Townsend Thoresen until 1987
- Dublin-Cherbourg (2002–2004)
- Felixstowe-Zeebrugge (1987–2002) – operated by Townsend Thoresen until 1987
- Felixstowe-Rotterdam (1987–2002) – transferred to Stena Line
- Fleetwood–Larne (1973–2004) – transferred to Stena Line
- Hull–Rotterdam – operated by North Sea Ferries until 1997
- Hull–Zeebrugge – ceased at end of 2020 season due to unprofitability
- Larne–Cairnryan – operated by Townsend Thoresen until 1987
- Larne–Troon (2001–2015) – ceased at end of 2015 season due to unprofitability
- Liverpool–Belfast (1971–1981)
- Liverpool–Dublin – operated by B&I Line until 1975, ceased December 2023 after Peel Ports informed Liverpool berth would no longer be available
- Middlesbrough-Gothenburg (1981–2001)
- Mostyn–Dublin (2001–2004)
- Portsmouth–Cherbourg (1987–2005) – operated by Townsend Thoresen until 1987
- Portsmouth–Le Havre (1987–2005) – " "
- Portsmouth–Caen (2004)
- Portsmouth–Bilbao (1993–2010)
- Rosslare–Cherbourg (1993–2005) – transferred to Celtic Link Ferries
- Southampton–Le Havre (1967–1985) – transferred to Normandy Ferries

=== Freight-only routes ===
- Dover – Zeebrugge (1991–2002)
- Rotterdam – Tilbury (from 2024)
- Teesport – Zeebrugge
- Tilbury – Zeebrugge
