= Spirit of France =

Ship built in 2011

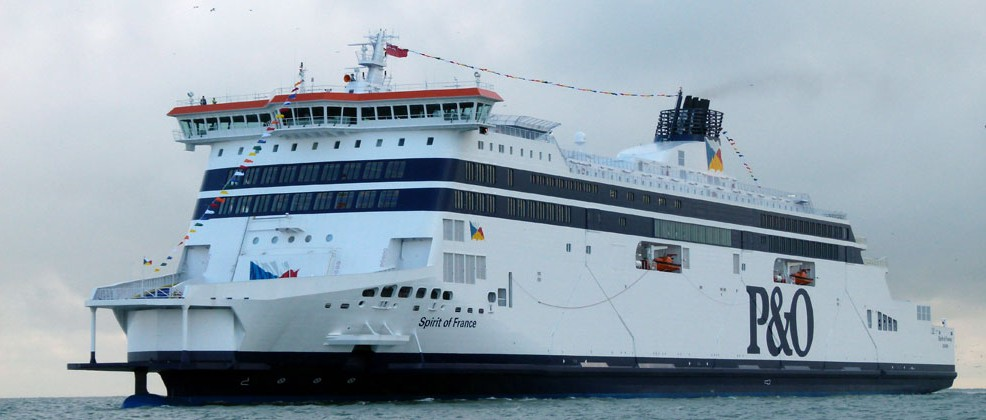
- Spirit of France maiden arrival in Dover on 28 January 2012

History
- Name: Spirit of France
- Owner: P&O Ferries
- Operator: P&O Ferries
- Port of registry: 2012–2019: Dover, United Kingdom; 2019–present: Limassol, Cyprus
- Route: Dover–Calais
- Builder: STX Europe, Rauma shipyard, Finland
- Cost: €180 million
- Yard number: 1368
- Laid down: 8 August 2010
- Launched: 18 February 2011
- Completed: 24 January 2012
- Maiden voyage: 9 February 2012
- Identification: IMO number: 9533816; MMSI number: 235082717
- Status: In service

General characteristics
- Tonnage: 47,592 GT
- Length: 213.5 m (700 ft 6 in)
- Beam: 31 m (101 ft 8 in)
- Draft: 6.7 m (22 ft 0 in)
- Installed power: 4 × MAN 7L 48/60 diesel engines
- Propulsion: 2 × controllable pitch propellers; 3 × bow thrusters
- Speed: 25 knots (46 km/h; 29 mph)
- Capacity: 2,000 passengers; 180 lorries or 1,059 cars
- Notes: 2,700 lane meters

Spirit of France is a cross-channel ferry operated by P&O Ferries on the Dover–Calais route. She is the second of two Spirit-class ships built for P&O Ferries, the other being Spirit of Britain

== Design and description ==
P&O Ferries signed a €360m contract with Aker Yards (STX Europe) on 8 August 2008 for the two largest ferries ever to be constructed for the Dover–Calais service, replacing Pride of Dover and Pride of Calais. The new vessels were specifically designed for the Dover–Calais route and were built to Lloyd’s Register "Green Passport" which provides a cradle-to-grave strategy for all materials used. The ferries are environmentally friendly, offering significant advances in fuel efficiency through a hydro-dynamically efficient hull form that optimise vessel performance with minimum fuel consumption.

The vessels are the first passenger ferries in the world to comply with the new International Maritime Organization "Safe Return to Port" requirements ahead of the international compliance date. These rules require that, in the event of a ship becoming a casualty, basic services are provided to all persons on board and that certain systems remain operational for safe return to port. Performance standards are stipulated for a wide range of ship systems including fire-fighting, power supply, propulsion, steering and navigation. The requirements come into force for vessels built after 1 July 2010.

The ships have the Lloyd's Register class notation of PSMR (Propulsion and Steering Machinery Redundancy) which will be assigned where the main propulsion and steering systems are configured to ensure that, in the event of equipment failure, the ship retains availability of propulsion power and manoeuvring capability to provide a safe return to port.

== Construction and career ==
On 13 May 2010 it was announced that the two new ferries constructed for P&O Ferries would be named Spirit of Britain and Spirit of France. Spirit of Britain was expected to enter service in January 2011 followed by Spirit of France in September 2011. Spirit of France was originally to be called Olympic Pride, but was renamed to avoid copyright infringement. On 8 June 2010, the same day as the float out of Spirit of Britain, the keel of Spirit of France was laid at the STX Europe Rauma shipyard in Rauma, Finland. In keeping with maritime tradition `lucky' coins were placed under the keel by P&O Ferries chairman, Robert Woods. In December 2010 Spirit of France's registered owner and ship manager became P&O Ferries Ltd, Dover, United Kingdom.

On 18 February 2011 the vessel was floated out of the building dock at the Rauma shipyard for the first time and manoeuvred to the fitting out quay. On 29 June the ferry departed Rauma for her first sea trials in the Gulf of Bothnia. From September through November Spirit of France underwent further sea trials owing to vibration issues, which delayed the ship's delivery. On 17 November it was reported in some maritime news outlets that P&O had refused delivery due to vibration issues.

On 28 November 2011 the vessel parted her moorings during a storm and ran aground within the shipyard. The vessel was dry docked and damage was deemed to be negligible. On 20 December the ship underwent further sea trials. On 3 January 2012 final sea/yard acceptance trials were completed and on 24 January the official handover to P&O Ferries took place and commencement of her journey to Dover began. The ship arrived at Dover for the first time on 28 January at 11:08 (UTC), eight minutes after the scheduled arrival time. On 29 January, Spirit of France started berthing trials in the Port of Dover and the following day arrived in Calais for berthing trials. The ship then departed for Dover and berthed at cruise terminal two for crew familiarisation. On 9 February Spirit of France departed Dover at 12:05 (UTC) carrying passengers for the first time, making its maiden voyage and beginning service for P&O Ferries.

In early 2019, Spirit of France was reflagged from the Port of Dover, England to Limassol, Cyprus in the lead up to Brexit due to the requirement by the owners of both Spirit-class vessels for these to remain under a European flag of registry.
