= European Mariner =

Ro-ro freight ferry built in 1977

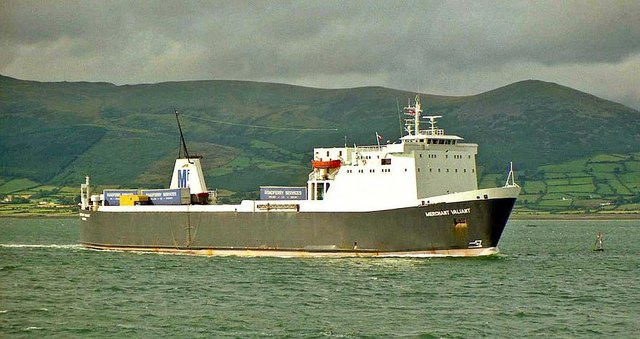
- Merchant Valiant off Greenore

History
- Name: European Mariner (2001–2011); European Highlander (1998–2001); Lion (1995–1998); Merchant Valiant (1990–1995); Salahala (1978–1990)
- Owner: Gateway Investments (1995–2011); Crescent Ship Management (1990–1995); Salahala Shipping Co. (1978–1990)
- Operator: P&O Ferries (2010–2011); P&O Irish Sea (2002–2010); Norse Island Ferries (2002); Isle of Man Steam Packet Company. (2002); Seatruck Ferries (2002); Color Line (2002); Commodore Ferries (2002); P&O Irish Sea (1995–2002); Pandoro (1993–1995); Merchant Ferries (1990–1993); Gilnavi Societa di Navigazione per Azoni (1978–1990)
- Builder: Rickmers Rhederei, Bremerhaven, Germany.
- Yard number: 390
- Launched: 25 October 1977
- In service: January 1978
- Out of service: 9 July 2011
- Home port: Nassau, Bahamas
- Identification: IMO number: 7636092; Callsign C6HL7
- Fate: Scrapped

General characteristics
- Tonnage: 5897 GRT
- Length: 381 ft 6 in (116.28 m)
- Beam: 59 ft 9 in (18.21 m)
- Draught: 17 ft 9 in (5.41 m)
- Installed power: 2 × Krupp 8M452AK 8-cylinder diesel engines, 5,918 hp (4,413 kW)
- Speed: 15.5 knots (28.7 km/h)
- Capacity: 12 passengers, 2,795 ft (852 m) freight lanes, 53 trailers, 210 TEU.

The European Mariner was a ro-ro freight ferry owned by P&O Irish Sea.

== History ==
European Mariner was launched in 1977 as Salahala for the Salahala Shipping Company. She was chartered by Gilvani for use on the Genoa - Malta - Pireus - Alexandria route. In 1990, she was sold to Crescent Shipping and renamed Merchant Valiant and initially put into service on the Warrenpoint - Heysham route before moving to the Larne - Ardrossan route on charter to Pandoro. She was sold to Pandoro in 1995 and renamed Lion on 15 October 1995. In January 1998, she was transferred to P&O Irish Sea following the merger of Pandoro and P&O European Ferries (Felixstowe) Ltd and she was renamed European Highlander. On 8 November 1999 she ran aground at Ardrossan. A new route was opened in 2001 running from Troon instead of Ardrossan, and European Highlander was renamed European Mariner on 30 June 2001 as the Highlander name was required for a new ship. European Mariner served the Larne - Troon route until January 2002. She then was chartered to various shipping companies in 2002, including Color Line, Commodore Ferries, the Isle of Man Steam Packet Company, Norse Island Ferries and Seatruck Ferries. On 6 November 2002 a lorry was washed overboard in storm conditions whilst European Mariner was on the Aberdeen - Lerwick route and she diverted to Invergordon. On 2 December, she came to the aid of the Merchant Venture which suffered an engine failure during a gale. Merchant Venture was escorted to Lerwick. In January 2003, European Mariner returned to service on the Larne - Troon route.

In 2006, European Mariner suffered damage to one of her propeller shafts in an accident at Troon. She ran for a few weeks on only one engine until repairs could be made at Birkenhead. In 2007, European Mariner was chartered to transport blades for wind turbines from Esbjerg that were destined for use on the turbines being erected as part of the Scroby Sands wind farm.

In May 2011 P&O Ferries announced that the European Mariner was to be replaced by the Norcape. The European Mariner operated her last service for P&O between Troon and Larne on 9 July 2011. She sailed for the shipbreakers yard in Turkey where she beached at Aliağa and scrapped.
