= Port of Calais =

Coordinates: 50.9681°N 1.8564°E

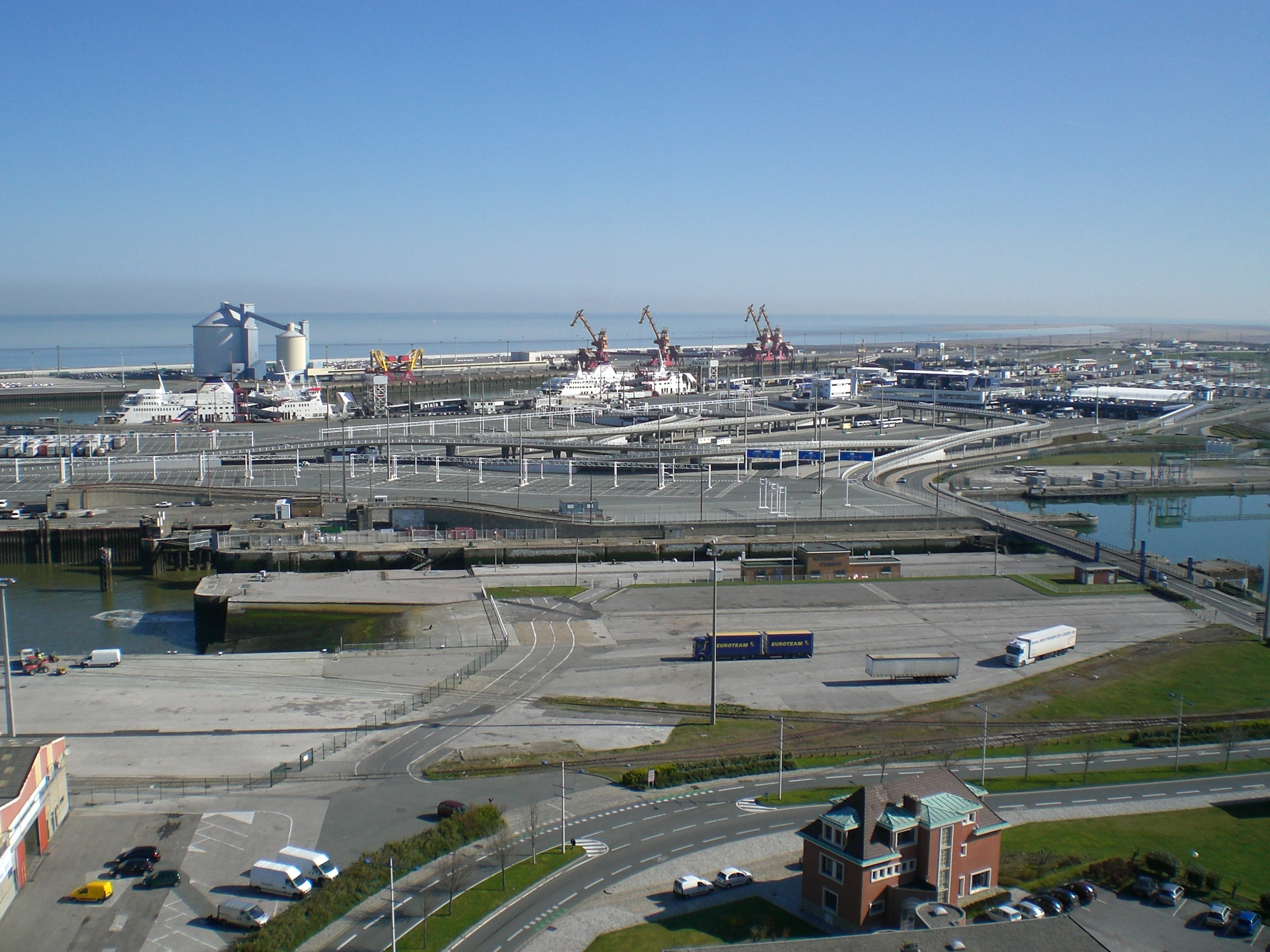
- Pictured in 2008
- Interactive map of Port of Calais

Location
- Country: France
- Location: Calais

Statistics
- Annual cargo tonnage: 1,200,000 (2025)
- Passenger traffic: 7,197,306 (2025)
- Website www.portboulognecalais.fr/en/

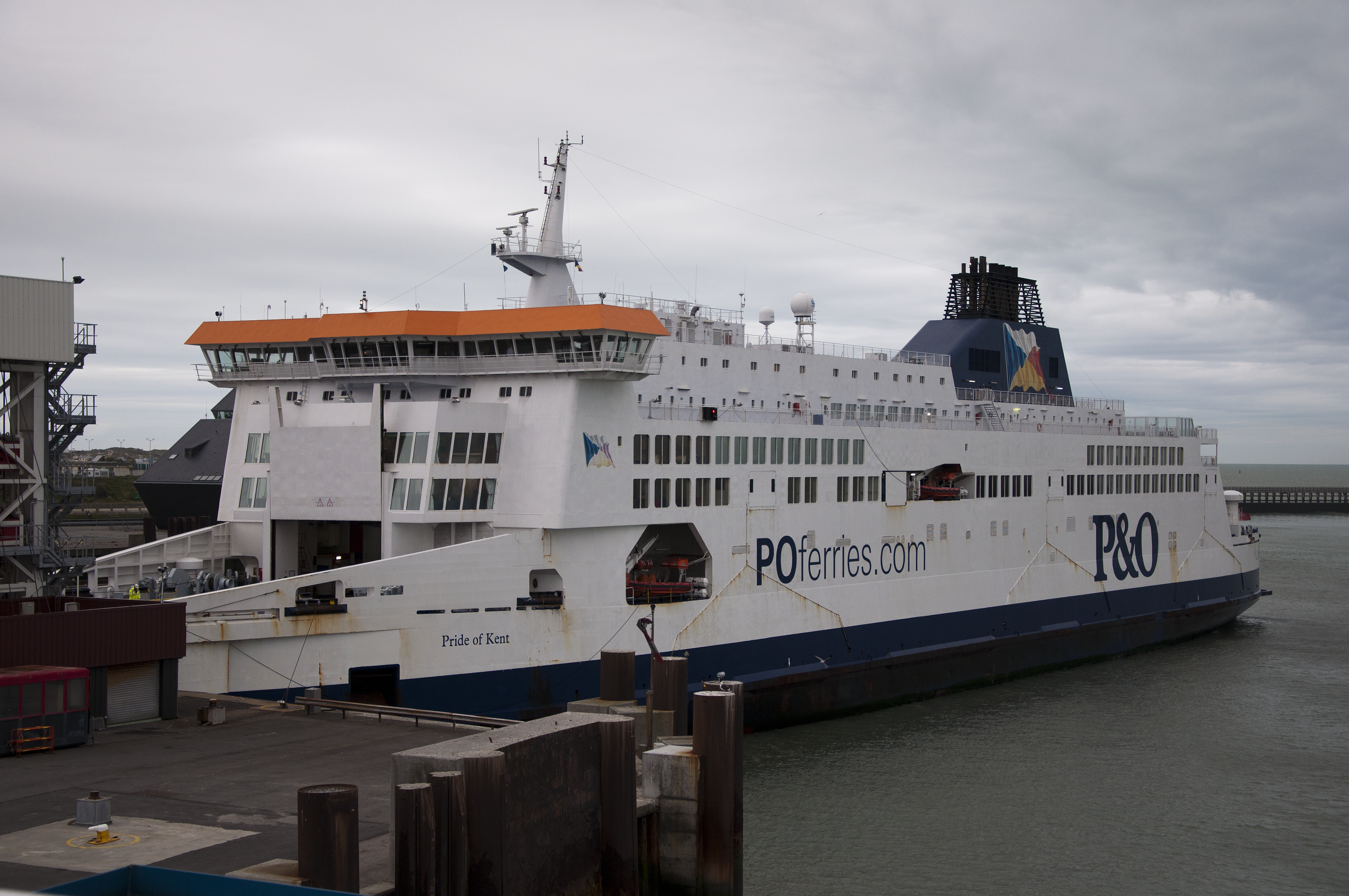
A P&O Ship at Calais

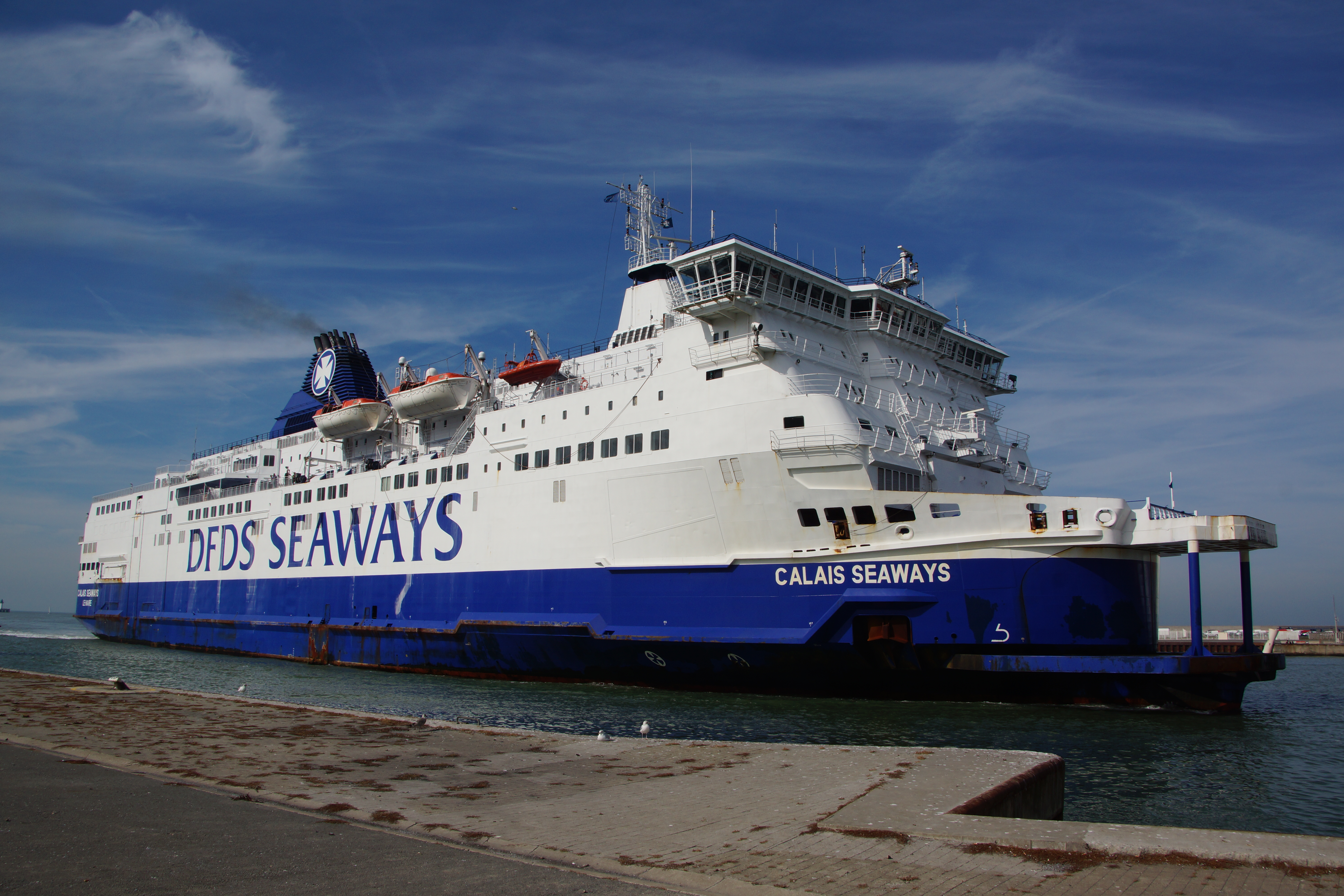
A DFDS Ship at Calais

The Port of Calais in northern France is the country's fourth-largest port and the largest for passenger traffic. It accounts for more than a third of economic activity in the town of Calais.

== Background ==
The Port of Calais was the first cable ship port in Europe and is the fourth-largest port in France and the largest for passenger traffic.

After the Treaty of Le Touquet was signed by France and the UK on 4 February 2003, juxtaposed controls were established in the port. Passengers travelling from the port to Dover, UK go through French exit checks (conducted by the French Border Police and French Customs) as well as UK immigration entry checks (by the UK Border Force) before embarkation. UK Border Force officers have the power to arrest and detain individuals in the immigration control zone in the port. Customs checks remain unaffected by the Treaty. Therefore, on arrival in Dover, travellers might still be stopped by UK Border Force customs officers for a customs inspection.

== Port layout ==
The harbour entrance is to the north-west of the main harbour, coming after a dredged channel due west. Once past the harbour entrance and in Avant Port (or Outer Harbour), the waterway splits into two directions, south-east to Canal de Calais or east-north east to Bassin Président Henri-Ravisse.

On the Bassin Président Henri-Ravisse not far in lie ferry berths on the southern side of the channel, while on the northern side lies a RoRo dock. These ferry berths are capable of handling a ship up to 215 metres long. Further past the berths lie the cargo ship docks, with the northern shoreline hosting four ship-to-shore cranes. The southern side of the channel has nothing as all the space is taken by the ferry cargo handling facilities, so it is instead used as a general mooring station. The Bassin Président Henri-Ravisse ends with three RoRo berths at the end.

The Canal de Calais goes to the south of the ferry terminal, and turns right, to the south into Arrière Port. Behind a sluice gate and a moveable bridge lies Bassin de Ouest, which is used as a mooring space for yachts and other pleasure boats. In Arrière Port however, there the channel branches off into Le Canal de Calais à Saint-Omer, which leads into a lock. Behind the lock lies Bassin Carnot, which is used as a secondary cargo terminal. After that, to the south-west lies another set of locks, which branch off into Calais' canal system.

== Marine transport ==
As of June 2021, three companies operate regular scheduled services to Calais:

=== Ferry services ===
Ferry Company	Destination	Notes
Irish Ferries	Dover	Service began 29 June 2021.
DFDS Seaways	Dover	
P&O Ferries	Dover	

== Hoverport ==
On 1 April 1969 a hoverport was built by Calais Chamber of Commerce to service the Hoverlloyd hovercraft operation from Ramsgate Hoverport. The hoverport closed when Hoverspeed ceased operations and has since been incorporated into the wider workings of the port after demolition in 2016.

== Traffic ==
Cargo traffic has tripled over the past two decades. In 2007 more than 41.5 million tonnes of traffic passed through Calais with some 11.52 million passengers, 1.4 million trucks and trailers, 2.249 million cars and 4,700 crossings a year. On average, ships sail from the port every 30 minutes. Most of the traffic in Calais comes from the Port of Dover.

== Expansion ==
In 2015, A new 400 million euro project was underway at the port to create a breakwater protecting a pool of 700 metres long, thus allowing Calais to have the capability to handle vessels of all shapes and sizes, from the smallest private yachts to supersize cruise ships, like the Oasis class cruise ships.

== Access ==
Buses connect the port with Gare de Calais-Ville on the SNCF network. There are regular TER Hauts-de-France trains through Hazebrouck to Lille Flandres (for SNCB/NMBS into Belgium, for example to Gent-Sint-Pieters), Calais-Fréthun, Boulogne, as well as along the coast via Gravelines to Dunkerque.

There are also direct TGV trains which run from Calais-Ville then via Calais-Fréthun (served by Eurostar) to Lille-Europe and Paris Gare du Nord.

== See also ==
- Port of Dover
- France–UK border

== See also ==
Jean-Marc Puissesseau - President and Chairman of the ports of Calais and Boulogne (Société d’Exploitation des Ports du Détroit)
