= Pride of Calais =

Ship built in 1987

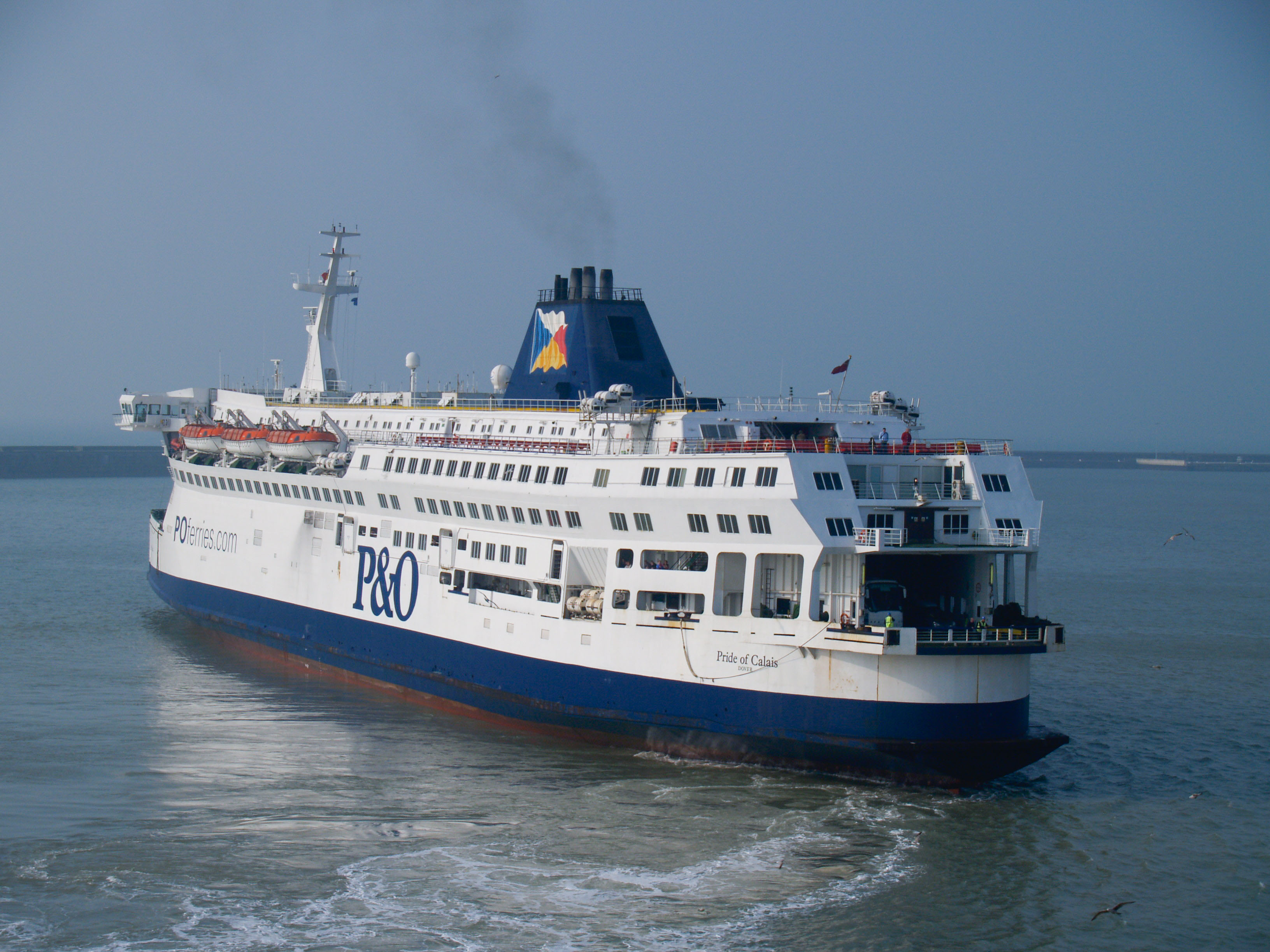
- Pride of Calais at the Port of Dover in 2007

History
- Name: 1987-1999: Pride of Calais; 1999-2002: P&OSL Calais; 2002-2003: PO Calais; 2003-2012: Pride of Calais; 2012-2013: Ostend Spirit
- Owner: 1987: Stanhope Steamship Co Ltd (Townsend Thoresen); 1987-2006: P&O European Ferries (Dover) Ltd; 2006-2013: P&O Ferries Ltd
- Operator: 1987-2002: P&O European Ferries; 1998-2002: P&O Stena Line; 2002-2012: P&O Ferries; 2012-2013: Transeuropa Ferries
- Port of registry: 1987-2012: Dover, United Kingdom; 2012-2013: Ramsgate, United Kingdom
- Route: 1987-2012: Dover-Calais; Feb-April 2013: Ramsgate-Ostend
- Builder: Schichau Unterweser AG, West Germany
- Yard number: 94
- Launched: 11 April 1987
- Completed: 27 November 1987
- Maiden voyage: 4 December 1987
- Identification: IMO number: 8517748; MMSI number: 232001710; Callsign: GJLY
- Fate: Scrapped at Aliağa

General characteristics
- Tonnage: 26,433 GT
- Length: 169.6 m (556.4 ft)
- Beam: 28.27 m (92.7 ft)
- Draught: 6.12 m (20.1 ft)
- Depth: 13.80 m (45.3 ft)
- Installed power: 3 x Sulzer 14ZA40S diesel engines producing a total of 23,100kW.
- Propulsion: 3 x controllable pitch propellers 2 x bow thrusters and one bow rudder
- Speed: 22 knots (41 km/h; 25 mph)
- Capacity: 2,290 passengers; 650 vehicles (1,500 lanemetres)

Pride of Calais was a cross-channel ferry owned and operated by P&O Ferries. She operated the Dover–Calais route between 1987 and 2012. In early 2013, under bareboat charter to Transeuropa Ferries, she served on their Ramsgate–Ostend route and was re-named Ostend Spirit. After further lay-up in the Port of Tilbury, she was sold for scrap and finally beached at a salvage yard in Turkey on 13 November 2013.

== Design ==
Pride of Calais and Pride of Dover were an evolution of Townsend Thoresen's 'Spirit Class', built in the same German shipyard. They were so large that their hulls were actually put together at a different shipyard to that of the construction. This was because the contract winner, Schichau Unterweser, could not fit the hull of the vessels on their slipway. They were instead constructed in sections in Bremerhaven and towed down the River Weser by Barge to Bremer Vulcan. Pride of Calais, unlike Pride of Dover, was largely complete when she was launched at Bremer Vulcan before being towed to Schichau Unterweser for fitting out. They had increased space for vehicles and passengers to meet increased demand and could carry 650 cars, 100 15m freight vehicles and 2290 passengers.

== History ==
Pride of Calais was built in 1987 for Townsend Thoresen and launched on 11 April of that same year. At the time, they were the biggest ferries to serve the Dover-Calais route.

She and her sister ship Pride of Dover were very successful, carrying more passengers across the Channel than any other previous ship. Pride of Calais was the first vessel to appear in the livery of the new company, P&O European Ferries (Dover) Limited, re-branded followed the Herald of Free Enterprise disaster.

In 2007, having just left dry dock at Falmouth, she made a visit to Belfast, having discovered technical problems. It was discovered that there was damage to the bow end of the vessel below the waterline. She arrived at Belfast at midday on 16 February to examine and repair the damage to her forward rudder skeg which was taking in water. Belfast was chosen due to the unavailability of more local facilities which were able to accommodate the vessel at the short notice needed due to the urgency of the repair. This was the only time either of the two ships visited Belfast or the Irish Sea.

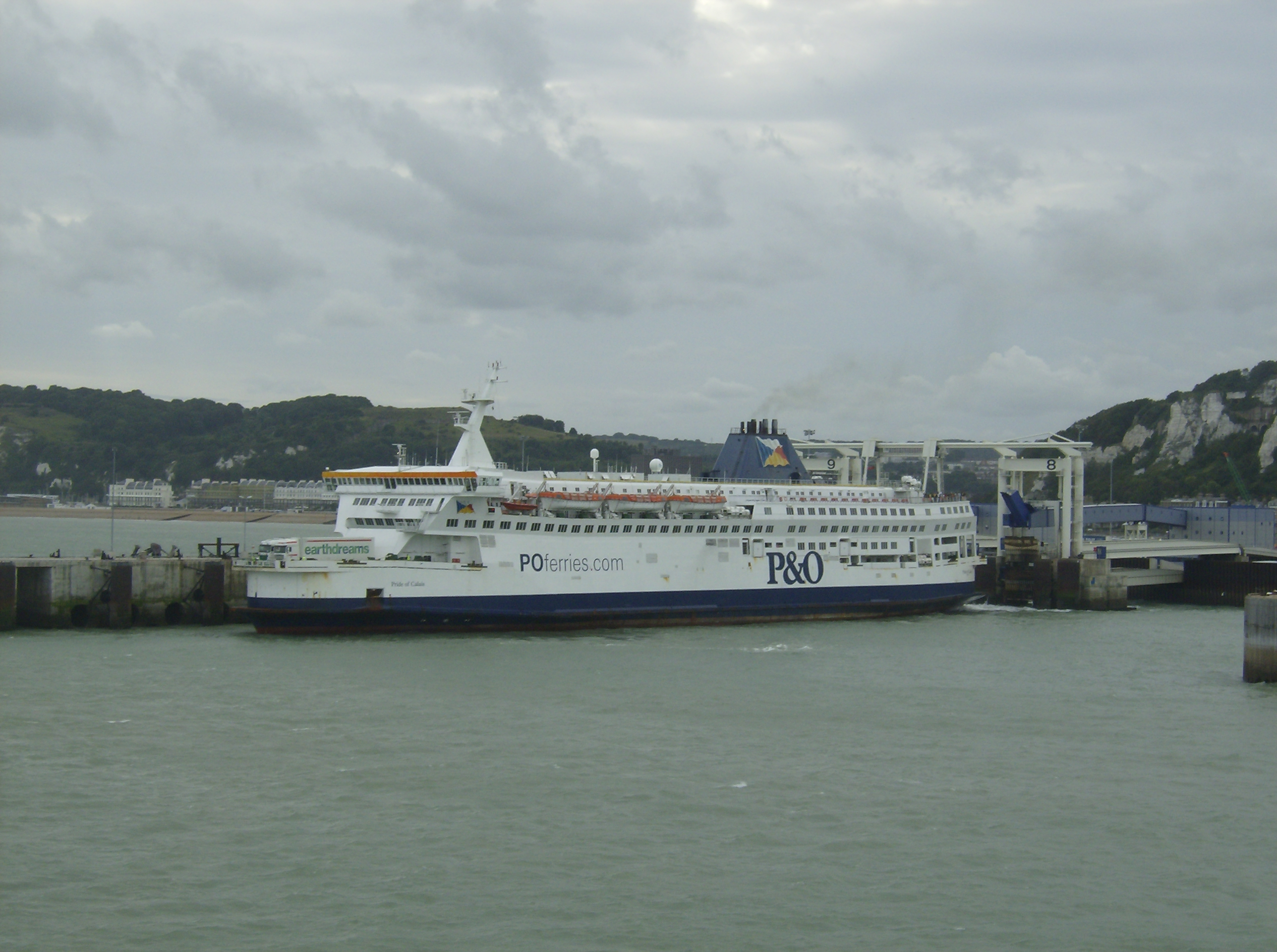
Pride of Calais in Dover

=== New vessels at Dover ===
After 20 years' service, P&O introduced new, larger vessels on the Dover - Calais route. The first to arrive was Spirit of Britain, displacing Pride of Calais' sister ship, Pride of Dover which left service on 15 December 2010 to be laid up at Tilbury. She was sold and departed in tow for Turkey on 29 November 2012. With the arrival of Spirit of France, Pride of Calais left service on 9 February 2012 to be laid up in Tilbury. Her future appeared very uncertain.

After just a week laid up at Calais, Pride of Calais returned to a freight service, while Pride of Kent underwent annual overhaul and inspection in Falmouth. Following the liquidation of SeaFrance at the end of 2011, demand for P&O services increased and Pride of Calais remained in service primarily as a freight ferry but operating in passenger service during refit and peak periods. At the beginning of March 2012, Pride of Calais underwent annual refit in Falmouth, re-entering service at Dover on Friday 23 March. She remained in service until October 2012 when it was announced that she would be withdrawn from the route.

Following the return of European Seaway from charter to a wind farm, Pride of Calais made her final sailing from Calais at 14:50 on Saturday 20 October 2012, arriving in Dover at 15:20. After unloading her final passengers and freight, she moved to Dover Cruise Terminal 2 and on to the Eastern Arm. She de-stored and sailed for Tilbury arriving at around 1600 on Tuesday 23 October 2012.

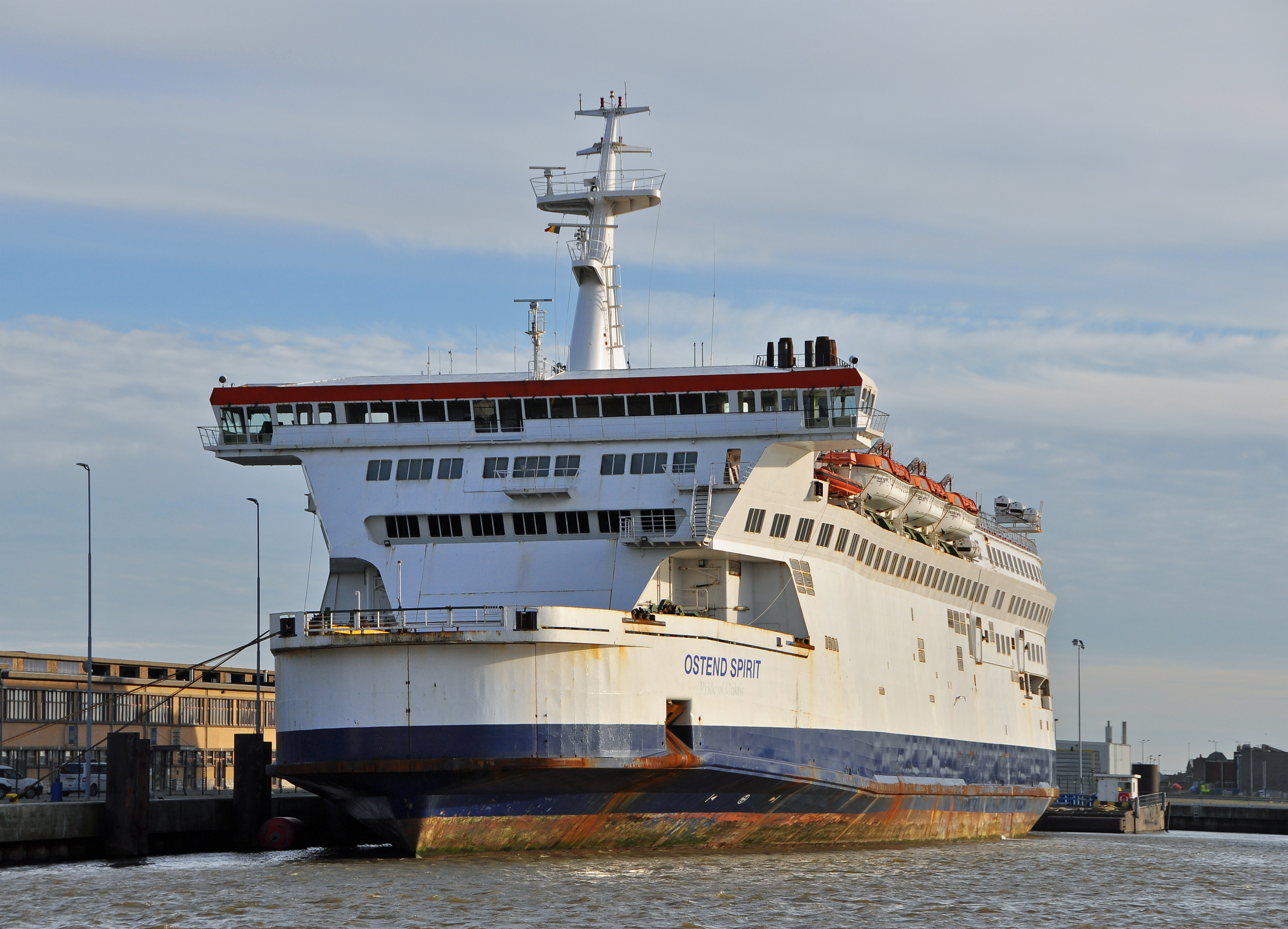
Ostend Spirit in Ostend, December 2012

=== Ostend Spirit ===
In December 2012, she started a three-year bareboat charter to Transeuropa Ferries for their Ramsgate - Ostend route. Her P&O livery, house flag and name were painted out and she departed Tilbury on 19 December 2012 for berthing trials in Ramsgate and Ostend. Renamed Ostend Spirit, she underwent a refit and livery change at Antwerp and began service on the Ramsgate-Ostend route on 1 February 2013.

Ostend Spirit was returned to P&O Ferries and was laid up at Tilbury docks at around lunchtime on 18 April 2013. All Transeuropa crew remained on board, refusing to get off as they had not been paid since February 2013. The vessel's charter was guaranteed by Transeuropa Ferries. P&O provided a bridge master and a few other crew members to ensure safety on board while the vessel was in warm layup. On 25 April 2013, Transeuropa Ferries filed for bankruptcy and she returned to lay-up in Tilbury . She sailed from Tilbury on 30 October 2013 for Aliaga where she was beached under power on 13 November 2013 at Aliaga ship demolishing yards in Turkey to be broken up.

== Service ==
Pride of Calais and her sister served on the Dover-Calais route from 1987 for over two decades. During French labour disputes, she sailed to Zeebrugge. From 2012, she was primarily a freight ferry on the route before being retired in October 2012 and placed in layup at Tilbury. For a few weeks she sat with her sister, Pride of Dover for the final time. Between February and April 2013, she operated as Ostend Spirit under bareboat charter to Transeuropa Ferries, she served on the Ramsgate - Ostend route before returning to P&O and laid up again in Tilbury.

== Sister ships ==
- Pride of Dover

== Scrapping ==
The Pride of Calais was scrapped at Aliağa, Turkey, being beached under power on 13 November 2013.
