= Altair (ship) =

Ferry scrapped in 2021

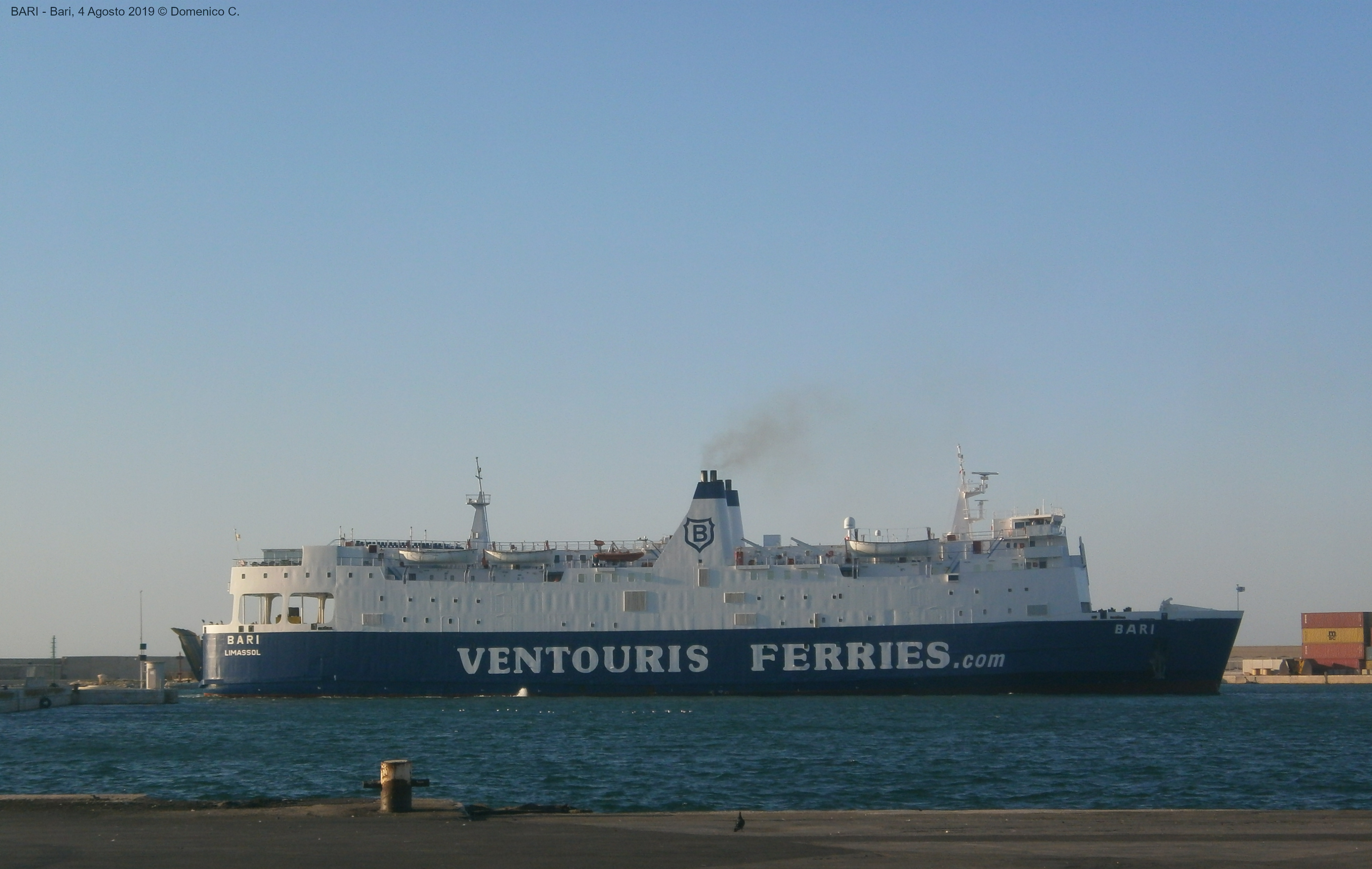
- Altair as Bari in Bari

History
- Name: 1980–1991: St Anselm; 1991–1999: Stena Cambria; 1999–2010: Isla de Botafoc; 2010: Winner 9; 2010–2021: Bari; 2021: Altair
- Owner: 1980–1984: Sealink / Sea Containers; 1990–1999: Stena Line; 1999–2003: UMAFISA; 2003–2010: Baleària; 2010–2021: Botcamp Shipping Co. / Ventouris Ferries; 2021: Perla Line Maritime
- Operator: 1980–1991: Sealink / Sealink British Ferries; 1991–1998: Stena Line; 1998–1999: P&O Stena Line; 1999–2010: UMAFISA / Baleària; 2010–2021: Ventouris Ferries
- Port of registry: 1980–1999: London, United Kingdom; 1999–2010: Santa Cruz de Tenerife, Spain; 2010–2021: Limassol, Cyprus; 2021: Saint Kitts and Nevis / Gabon
- Route: Bari – Durrës; Bari – Igoumenitsa / Corfu / Cephalonia; Former: Dover – Calais; Former: Holyhead – Dún Laoghaire; Former: Barcelona – Ibiza
- Ordered: 1978
- Builder: Harland & Wolff; Belfast, Northern Ireland
- Yard number: 1715
- Laid down: 1978
- Launched: 5 December 1979
- Christened: 4 December 1979
- Completed: October 1980
- Acquired: 2010 (by Ventouris Ferries)
- Maiden voyage: 27 October 1980
- In service: 1980
- Out of service: 2021
- Identification: IMO number: 7813937; Call sign: 5BZT2; MMSI number: 209080000
- Fate: Scrapped at Chittagong, Bangladesh, in December 2021
- Status: broken up

General characteristics
- Class & type: Custom Harland & Wolff Ro-Pax Ferry
- Tonnage: 12,705 GT (originally 7,003 GT); 1,829 DWT
- Length: 129.65 m (425 ft 4 in)
- Beam: 21.62 m (70 ft 11 in)
- Draught: 4.84 m (15 ft 11 in)
- Depth: 11.82 m (38 ft 9 in)
- Decks: 8
- Ramps: Bow visor, stern loading ramp
- Installed power: 2 × SEMT-Pielstick 16PC2-5V-400 main diesel engines (total 15,300 kW / 20,800 hp)
- Propulsion: 2 × controllable pitch propellers
- Speed: 18.0 knots (33.3 km/h; 20.7 mph) (service) / 19.5 knots (36.1 km/h; 22.4 mph) (max)
- Capacity: 1,125 passengers (30 cabins); 309 cars or 50 freight trailers (780 lane metres)
- Crew: 40–50

Altair, originally and most prominently known as St Anselm and later Bari, was a 129.65-metre Ro-Pax ferry built in 1980 by Harland & Wolff in Belfast, Northern Ireland. Built for Sealink's English Channel operations, she spent over four decades serving key routes across the UK, Spain, and the Adriatic Sea. She was renamed Altair in September 2021 strictly for her final scrap voyage to Bangladesh.

== Sealink ==
Bari started her career as the St Anselm, order by and for Sealink services in the English Channel. She was launched at the Harland & Wolff shipyard in Belfast on 5 December 1979 and completed her maiden voyage on 27 October 1980.

After two years in service, on 31 December 1982, the St Anselm returned to Belfast for a £750,000 extension to her aft decks. This extension provided an enlarged duty-free shopping area and additional accommodation, increasing her tonnage by 402 GT to 7,405 GT and her passenger capacity to 1,400. On 28 March 1983 during her trip back to Dover through the Irish Sea, the St Anselm was temporarily brought into service on the Fishguard-Rosslare route following the failure of Stena Normandica's engines.

In 1990, the St Anselm was displaced from the Dover-Calais route by Sealink's acquisition of the Fantasia, the St Anselm instead took up a service operating between Folkestone and Boulogne. Not long after this transition, Sealink was acquired by Stena Line, in 1991 the St Anselm was transferred to Holyhead, being renamed the Stena Cambria as a refit relief during February and March, briefly returning to Dover before resuming service in the Irish Sea in July that same year.

== Stena Line ==
In July 1995, SNAT announced they would be terminating the pooling agreement that had been in place with Stena Sealink Line, which as a result, dropped the "Sealink" name, becoming just Stena Line. As a result of the loss of the two French vessels, Stena Line transferred the Stena Cambria and the Stena Empereur back to the Dover-Calais route for the 1996 season. In March 1997 she provided refit relief in Stranraer and on 3 May 1997 became the last conventional ferry to sail out of Dun Laoghaire to Holyhead having provided overhaul relief for the Stena Explorer. In March 1998 she transferred to the Newhaven-Dieppe route under the newly formed P&O Stena Line, staying there until the routes withdrawal in January 1999.

== Post P&O Stena Line ==
Following the routes withdrawal in January 1999, the Stena Cambria was laid up in Zeebrugge awaiting sale, eventually being purchased by UMAFISA, entering service for them between Barcelona and Ibiza that November as the Isla de Botafoc. In August 2003, UMAFISA and the Isla de Botafoc were acquired by rivals, Balearia. She continued services with Balearia to Ibiza and Menorca until her eventual sale to Ventouris Ferries of Greece in 2010, briefly being renamed Winner 9 and then to the Bari.

== Sister ships ==
- Morocco Sun
- Port Link
- European Star
