= Pride of Canterbury =

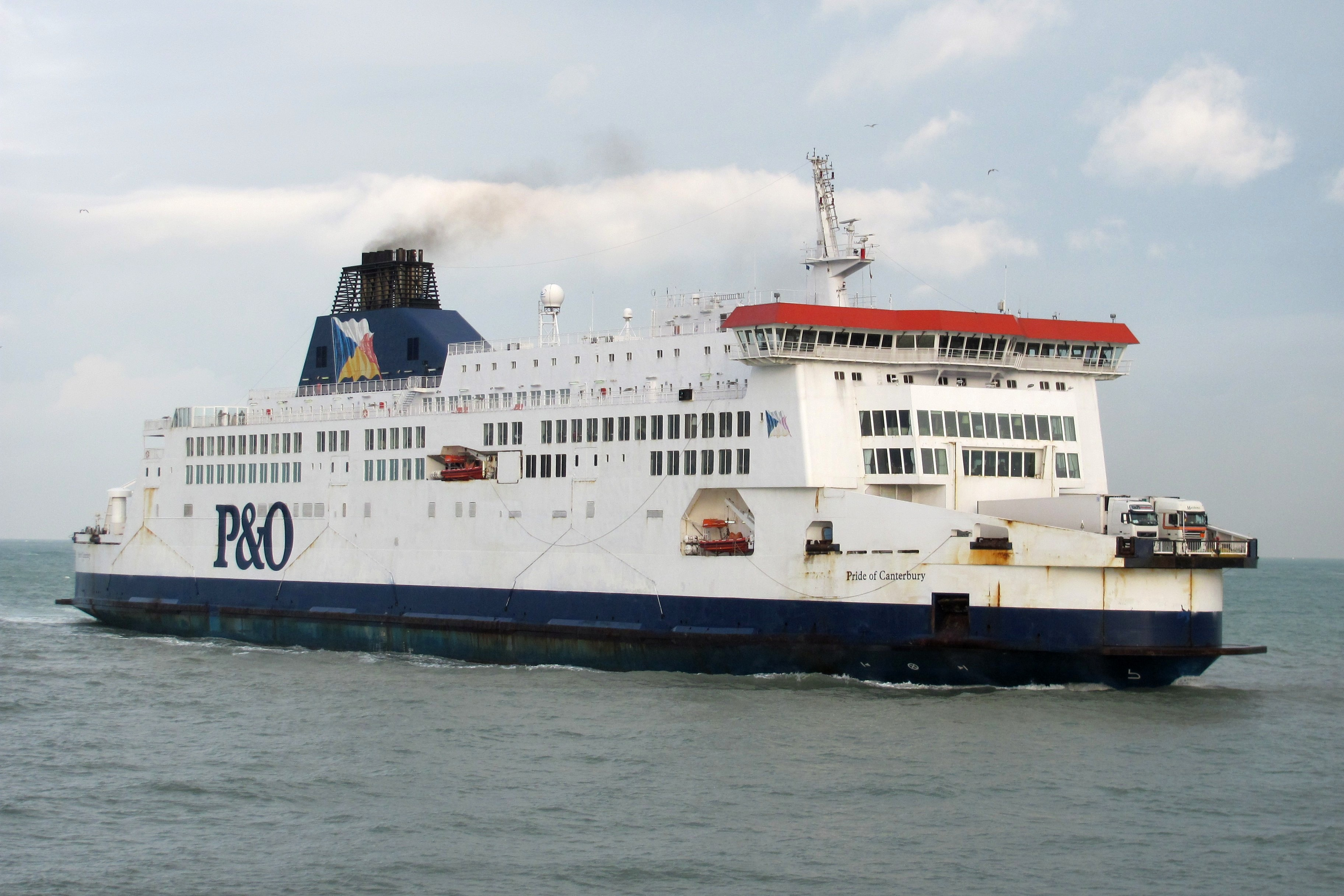
- Pride of Canterbury approaching Calais

History
- Name: European Pathway (1991–2003); Pride of Canterbury (2003–present)
- Owner: P&O European Ferries (1991–1998); P&O Stena Line (1998–2002); P&O (2002–present)
- Operator: P&O European Ferries (1991–1998); P&O Stena Line (1998–2002); P&O Ferries (2002–present)
- Port of registry: Limassol, Cyprus
- Route: Dover - Calais
- Builder: Schichau Unterweser, Germany
- Yard number: 1076
- Launched: 8 October 1991
- Completed: 29 December 1991
- Maiden voyage: 4 January 1992
- Out of service: 5 October 2023
- Identification: IMO number: 9007295
- Fate: Scrapped Alaiga, Turkey

General characteristics
- Tonnage: 1991–2002: 22,986 GT; 2003–present: 30,365 GT
- Length: 179.7 m (589 ft 7 in)
- Beam: 28.3 m (92 ft 10 in)
- Draft: 6.27 m (20 ft 7 in)
- Installed power: 4 x Sulzer 8ZA40S diesel engines
- Propulsion: Two controllable pitch propellers
- Speed: 21 knots (39 km/h; 24 mph)
- Capacity: 1991–2002: 200 passengers; 124 15 m (49 ft) freight vehicles; 2003–present: 2,000 passengers; 650 passenger vehicles or 120 15 m freight vehicles

Pride of Canterbury was a ferry operated by P&O Ferries across the English Channel between Dover, England and Calais, France. She made her maiden voyage on 4 January 1992 as the European pathway. She was converted in 2003 to a pure passenger vessel. She retired from service on the 10 September 2023 before a brief lay up and a departure for Alaiga to be broken up for recycling

== History ==
Pride of Canterbury was the second of four 'European-class' freight ferries ordered for P&O European Ferries' Dover-Zeebrugge route. Between 1992 and 2002 she sailed between Dover and Zeebrugge for P&O European Ferries and later P&O Stena Line. She was converted in late 2002/early 2003 and re-entered service as Pride of Canterbury (replacing the ageing P&OSL Canterbury), sailing from Dover to Calais.

On 31 January 2008 she struck the wreck of SS Mahratta while manoeuvring into The Downs off the Kent coast during heavy weather. The collision caused the loss of one of her propellers and damaged the prop shaft and gearbox. Although she was able to sail to Dover unaided, the ferry required assistance berthing. Following emergency repairs in Falmouth she returned to service operating with only one propeller. As a result, she was unable to operate in rough weather and was frequently laid up in Dover or sheltering off the Kent coast waiting for the wind to drop. The ferry was due to be drydocked at a European repair yard in November 2008 to be fitted with a new propeller with a view to being back in service for the Christmas 2008 period. The vessel reentered service again on the Dover to Calais route.

On 29 September 2014 a fire broke out in the engine room at around 8am as it arrived into Calais. The fire was quickly extinguished by the ship's fire protection system. Nobody was injured and the ship disembarked all the passengers safely. The stricken ferry was taken to Arno Shipyard in Dunkerque for repairs; to make up for the missing ship, Pride of Burgundy's services were increased from three to five.

In early 2019, Pride of Canterbury, like all P&O vessels on the Dover-to-Calais route, was flagged out to Cyprus, a measure explained by the company as motivated by tax advantages in view of Brexit. She is now registered in Limassol.

On 21 March 2022, United Kingdom Transport Secretary Grant Shapps announced that he would require P&O Ferries to rename Pride of Canterbury and other ships on the fleet which carry British names if the company was found to have breached employment regulations following the summary dismissal without notice via Zoom of 800 British seafarers who were to be replaced with cheaper overseas agency workers. On 24 March 2022, P&O Ferries CEO Peter Hebblethwaite confirmed that the management of the company illegally fired 800 British seafarers so it was expected that the ship would have to have its name changed as Shapps announced three days previously.

She retired on 5 October 2023, with her final crossing from Dover to Calais, before travelling to Tilbury Docks. In January 2024, she departed for Aliağa, Turkey. She was beached on the 16 January and scrapped. She was replaced by the P&O Liberté.

== Sister ships ==
As built, European Pathway was identical to European Seaway and European Highway. The fourth 'European Class' freight ferry was converted to a multi-purpose vessel for the Dover-Calais route and named Pride of Burgundy though she still retained a number of similarities. Following conversion to multi-purpose ship, Pride of Canterbury is nearly identical to Pride of Kent.

- European Seaway
- Pride of Burgundy
- Pride of Kent

Pride of Canterbury and Pride of Kent are commonly known as the 'Darwin Twins' or 'Darwins' after the project name given by P&O to the conversion of the ships.
