= Pride of Dover =

Car ferry launched in 1987

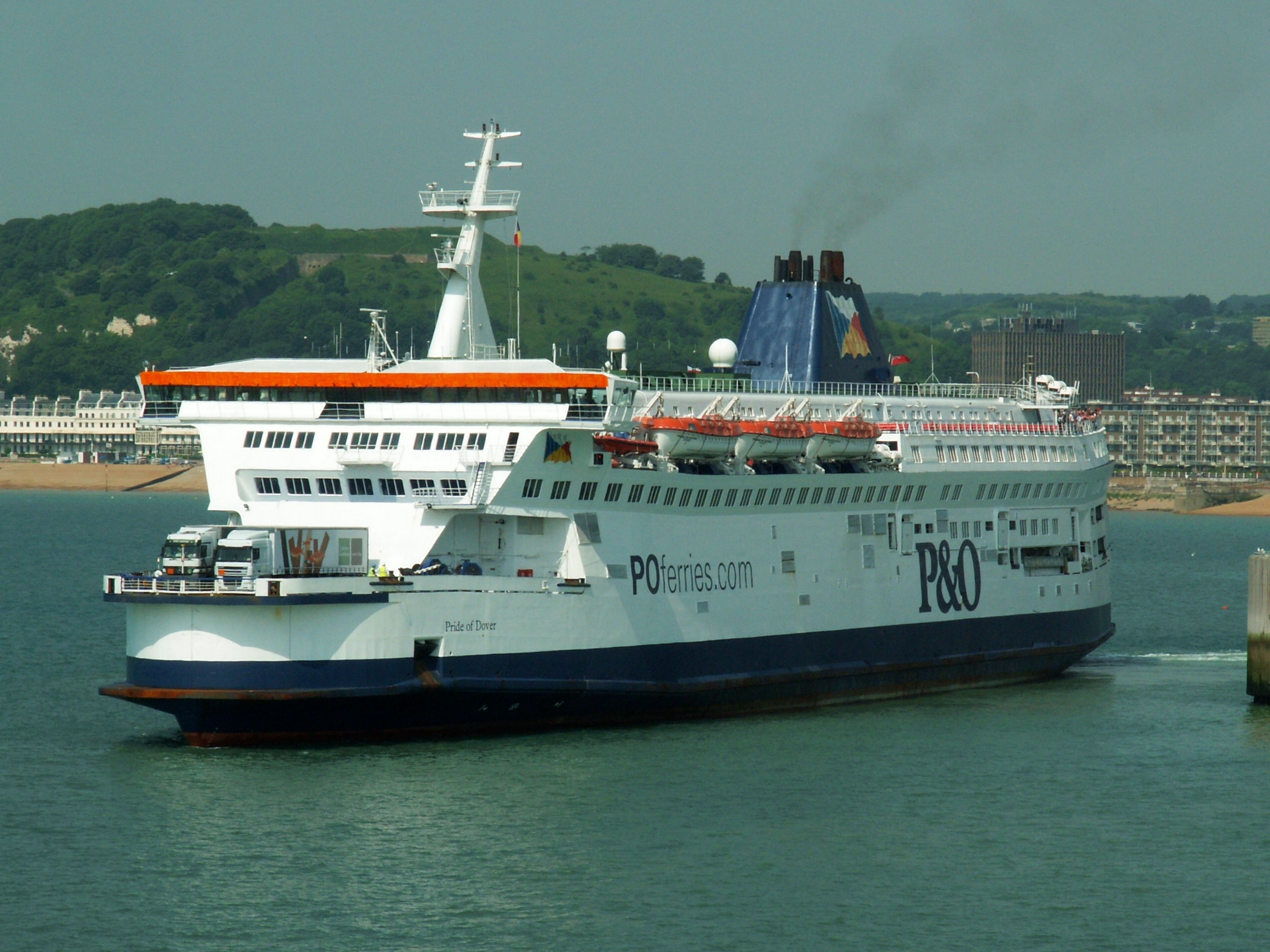
- Pride of Dover leaving Dover in 2006

History
- Name: 1987–1998: Pride of Dover; 1998–2002: P&OSL Dover; 2002–2003: PO Dover; 2003–2012: Pride of Dover; 2012: Pride
- Owner: 1987:Stanhope Steamship Co Ltd (Townsend Thoresen); 1987–2006: P&O European Ferries; 2006–2012: P&O Ferries; 2012: German shipping interests
- Operator: 1987 - 1998: P&O European Ferries; 1998 - 2002: P&O Stena Line; 2002 - 2012: P&O Ferries
- Port of registry: Dover, United Kingdom
- Route: Dover-Calais
- Builder: Schichau Unterweser, West Germany
- Cost: £42 million
- Yard number: 93
- Laid down: 9 April 1986
- Launched: 20 September 1986
- Completed: 27 May 1987
- Maiden voyage: 2 June 1987
- In service: 2 June 1987
- Out of service: 15 December 2010
- Identification: IMO number: 8517736; MMSI number: 232001670; Callsign: GJCR
- Fate: Scrapped at Aliağa

General characteristics
- Tonnage: 26,433 GT
- Length: 169.6 m (556.4 ft)
- Beam: 28.27 m (92.7 ft)
- Draft: 6.12 m (20.1 ft)
- Depth: 13.80 m (45.3 ft)
- Installed power: 3 x Sulzer ZA40S diesels
- Propulsion: 3 x controllable pitch propellers 2 x bow thrusters and one bow rudder
- Speed: 22 knots (41 km/h; 25 mph)
- Capacity: 2,290 passengers; 650 vehicles (1,500 lanemetres)

Pride of Dover was a cross-channel ferry built-in 1987 for Townsend Thoresen. One of two 'Chunnel Beater' ships, she primarily operated across the English Channel on the Dover to Calais route alongside sister ship the Pride of Calais for P&O Ferries until 2010.

== History ==
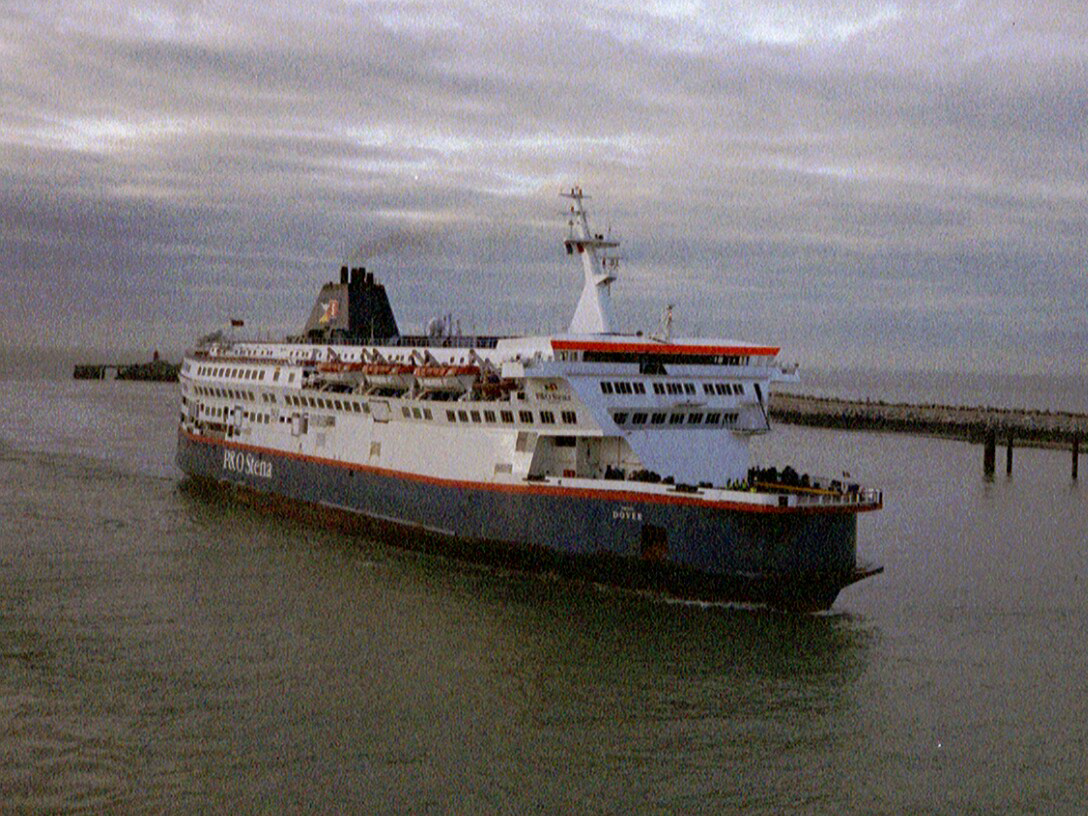
The Pride of Dover as the P&OSL Dover for P&O Stena Line

Pride of Dover was the last new ship to appear in service with the famous Townsend Thoresen orange hull, although she was delivered with the P&O house flag painted on her funnel in place of the traditional 'TT' insignia which was changed prior to delivery. Townsend Thoresen was renamed P&O European Ferries late in 1987, following the Herald of Free Enterprise disaster, and Pride of Dover was swiftly repainted in the new company colours.

Designed by Townsend Thoresen's in-house architect, Jimmy Ayres, they were an evolution of the Spirit Class that preceded them and were built in the same dockyard. They were so large, however, that their hulls were put together at a different shipyard to that of the construction. This was because the contract winner, Schichau Unterweser, could not fit the hull of the vessels on their slipway. They were instead constructed in sections in Bremerhaven and towed down the River Weser by Barge to Bremer Vulcan. Pride of Calais unlike Pride of Dover was largely complete when she was launched at Bremer Vulcan before being towed to Schichau Unterweser for fitting out.

In 1990 the vessel had its first major modification with the additional of the "Club Class" lounge and modified forward superstructure with a new row of windows on the deck directly beneath the bridge. On 3 March 1998 P&O European Ferries and Stena Line merged their short sea operations and the ship was under the control of P&O Stena Line and carried the name P&OSL Dover from 1998 until 2002.

In the summer of 1998, the Pride of Dover carried Michael Jackson en route to Paris as part of his Bad World Tour, after bad weather disrupted planned flights.

Following the ending of the P&O Stena Line operation she returned to P&O control she was renamed PO Dover before she was repainted into new P&O Ferries livery when her name returned to Pride of Dover during her refit in 2003. During this refit at Falmouth here bridge wings were also enclosed.

On 20 February 2007, she made contact with a berth in Calais damaging her 'Cow Catcher'. Due to this she remained at the Dover cargo terminal until the 24th whilst undergoing emergency repairs. On 2 May, she departed for her annual overhaul at A&P Falmouth. this period of maintenance over ran resulting in her not re-entering on 24 May causing three sailings to be cancelled finally re-entering Service a day later.

Less than a month later on 19 June 2007, whilst coming astern to berth 7 in Dover, she suffered a power failure and made heavy contact with the quay causing damage to her stern spade and resulting with the stern doors becoming unusable necessitating a visit to the ARNO shipyard in Dunkerque for repairs lasting a week.

On 10 October 2008, she was sent to Rotterdam with propeller problems returning to service 4 days later. On 17 November 2009, she suffered engine problems in one of the three engines. After riding out storm-force winds, she went to lay-be berth at Calais before going to ARNO at Dunkerque on 22 November. She left ARNO on the 25th returning to service on the 27th reportedly suffering from gearbox problems and only using two engines. She went back to ARNO mid-January 2010 for repairs to the gearbox and propellers returning in service on the 27th. On 24 April she was again suffering from engine problems and went to the Dover Cruise Terminal for Centre main engine work.

In October 2010 it was announced that she would end her P&O service on 14 December 2010 with her last crossing leaving Dover at 23:55 local time. She was replaced by the new Superferry Spirit of Britain, with a bigger capacity and almost double the gross tonnage, at 47,600 tons, the second-largest ferry to cross the channel. Pride of Dover was laid up in Tilbury Docks and offered for sale. In February 2012, her house flag was removed from her funnel, but she remained in warm lay-up at Tilbury until 23 October 2012, when Pride of Dover was put into cold lay-up. All her generators were switched off and her skeleton crew was transferred to her sister, Pride of Calais, which was laid-up in Tilbury on that day.

On 6 November 2012, almost two years after she had been laid up, P&O Ferries announced that the Pride of Dover, with her engine damaged beyond repair, to German shipping interests. Her name was changed to Pride and all her P&O logos were removed. On 29 November, she left Tilbury for Tuzla, Turkey in tow of tug Eide Fighter, but was delivered to Aliağa on 27 December.

== Sister Ship ==
- Pride of Calais built 1987
