= Pride of Burgundy =

Ship built in 1993

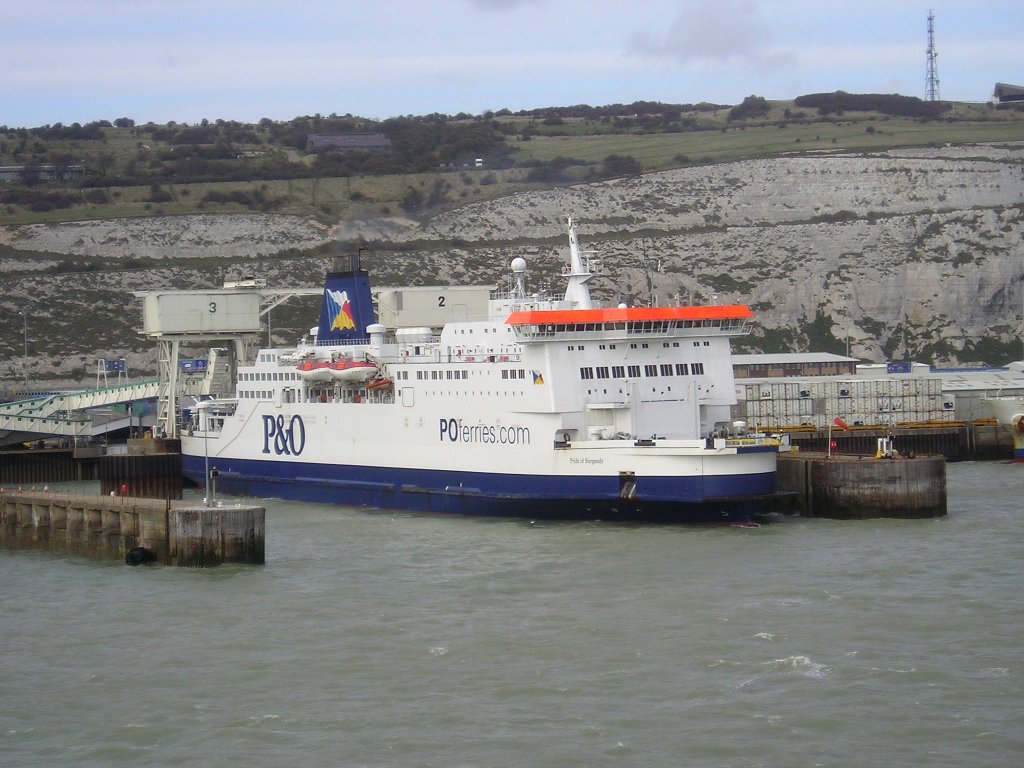
- Pride of Burgundy at Dover, April 2004

History
- Name: 1993–1999: Pride of Burgundy; 1999–2002: P&OSL Burgundy; 2002–2003:PO Burgundy; 2003–2023: Pride of Burgundy
- Owner: 1993–1998: P&O European Ferries; 1998–2002: P&O Stena Line; 2002–2023: P&O Ferries
- Operator: 1993–1998: P&O European Ferries; 1998–2002: P&O Stena Line; 2002–2020: P&O Ferries
- Port of registry: Limassol, Cyprus
- Route: Dover-Calais
- Builder: Schichau Seebeckwerft, Germany
- Launched: 16 May 1992
- Completed: 23 March 1993
- Maiden voyage: 5 April 1993
- In service: 1993
- Out of service: 2023
- Identification: Call sign: MQSQ9; IMO number: 9015254; MMSI number: 232001470; Official Number: 722960
- Fate: Sold for scrap

General characteristics
- Tonnage: 28,138 gt
- Length: 179.7 m (589.6 ft)
- Beam: 28.3 m (92.8 ft)
- Draft: 6.27 m (20.6 ft)
- Installed power: 4 x Sulzer ZA40S Diesels
- Propulsion: Two controllable pitch propellers
- Speed: 21 knots (39 km/h; 24 mph)
- Capacity: 1,420; 600 passenger vehicles or 120 15m freight vehicles

Pride of Burgundy was a cross-channel ferry owned by P&O Ferries. It operated on the Dover to Calais route from 1993 to 2022.

== History ==
Pride of Burgundy was planned as the fourth European Class freight-only vessel, to be named European Causeway for P&O European Ferries' Dover to Zeebrugge route. Due to demand on the Dover to Calais route, the ship was converted to a multi-purpose ferry (passengers and freight) prior to completion with the addition of extra superstructure. It is a commonly stated in ferry publications and website that the original choice of name for the ship was Pride of Lille. By capacity, she is one of the smallest Dover – Calais ferries, only taking 1,200 passengers and 600 cars.

In 2010 she was chartered to Ramsgate in east Kent to host the opening of the Thanet Wind Farm. Pride of Burgundy took new crew, wind farm employees, their families and VIPs right out to sea to see the wind turbines up close. She was back in service the next day

On 27 October 2012 Pride of Burgundy collided with the Berlioz due to high winds, sustaining minor damage to the right bridge wing, which was fixed in a couple of hours. Berlioz received damage to her lifeboats putting her out of service.

Pride of Burgundy departed Dover on 3 March 2017 for Gdańsk, Poland where she underwent a major refit. She arrived at the Remontowa shipyard on 5 March and returned to Dover on 25 March, resuming her usual Dover to Calais schedule the following day.

In early 2019, Pride of Burgundy, like all P&O vessels on the Dover to Calais route, was re-flagged to Cyprus, a measure explained by the company as motivated by tax advantages in view of Brexit. She was registered in Limassol.

From 3 May 2020, Pride of Burgundy was docked at the Port of Leith, Scotland, as a result of the reduction in traffic across the straights of Dover due to the COVID-19 pandemic. She returned to Dover in late October that year, re-entering service on 3 November in a freight-only mode. On 7 December 2020 the ship was moved to the River Fal lay up berths near Falmouth, Cornwall. In April 2023 it arrived in Aliağa, Turkey for scrapping.

== Sister ships ==
Pride of Burgundy has no identical sisters because of her conversion to multi-purpose passenger vessel during construction. She shares mechanical, layout and visual features with the other European Class ships in the P&O fleet:

- European Seaway
- Pride of Canterbury
- MS Pride of Kent
