= SS Mahratta (1891) =

Coordinates: 51°14′45″N 01°30′05″E

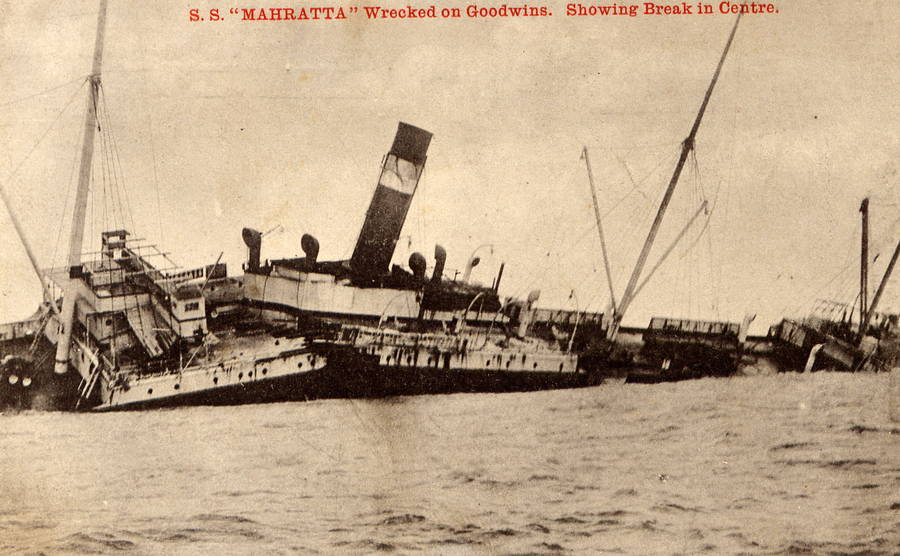

History

United Kingdom
- Name: SS Mahratta
- Owner: T & J Brocklebank Ltd; (Brocklebank Line)
- Builder: Harland and Wolff Ltd, Belfast
- Yard number: 246
- Launched: 19 November 1891
- Completed: 28 January 1892
- Home port: Liverpool
- Identification: Official Number: 99366; Code letters MFLJ
- Fate: Wrecked 8 April 1909

General characteristics
- Tonnage: 5,679 grt
- Length: 446 ft (135.94 m)
- Beam: 49 ft 2 in (14.99 m)
- Draught: 30 ft (9.14 m)
- Propulsion: 1 x Harland & Wolff 6-cylinder triple-expansion steam engine, 429 hp (320 kW).
- Crew: 90

SS Mahratta was a steamship owned by Brocklebank Line which was launched in 1891 and ran aground on the Goodwin Sands in 1909.

== History ==
SS Mahratta was launched on 19 November 1891. Its name is an old spelling of Maratha. In 1900 she served as a troopship in connection with the Boer War.

=== Shipwreck ===
On 9 April 1909 (Good Friday), the 5,639 ton liner Mahratta stuck in the Goodwin Sands, with a heavy cargo, a crew of 90 and 17 passengers. The Mahratta was homeward bound to London from Calcutta, India with a mixed cargo including jute, rice, rubber and tea. She ran aground on the Fawk Spit of the Goodwin Sands in calm weather and stuck fast.

The next day, lifeboats were launched and the majority of the passengers were rescued by the Deal lifeboat. Although two tugs were sent from Dover, it was impossible to pull Mahratta free. Mahratta broke in two the day after this. The three passengers aboard at the time included one female passenger who had refused to leave as she had a dog with her which would have to go into quarantine if rescued.

The Sands did not break the Mahratta's back for 24 hours, allowing time for locals to help unload its cargo. Many of them demanded their right of salvage, and when customs officers searched their houses they were physically roughed up.

The westerly wind increased in strength, and as cargo was salvaged from No.4 and 5 holds the ship listed making further salvage more difficult.

A Board of Trade inquiry found that the ship had run aground because the pilot had failed to recognise the Gull Light and then took an incorrect course.

A second ship named Mahratta ran aground on the Goodwin Sands in 1939, less than a mile away from the site of the wreck of the first Mahratta.

== Pride of Canterbury ferry incident ==
On 31 January 2008, the roll-on/roll-off passenger ferry Pride of Canterbury operated by P&O Ferries struck the wreck of Mahratta while manoeuvering in severe weather into a holding position in The Downs. The ferry suffered extensive damage to her port propeller and had to be assisted to berth in Dover. It is not clear whether the wreck site named in the MAIB report is that of the first SS Mahratta or the later vessel.
