= MS Pride of Kent =

Ferry boat

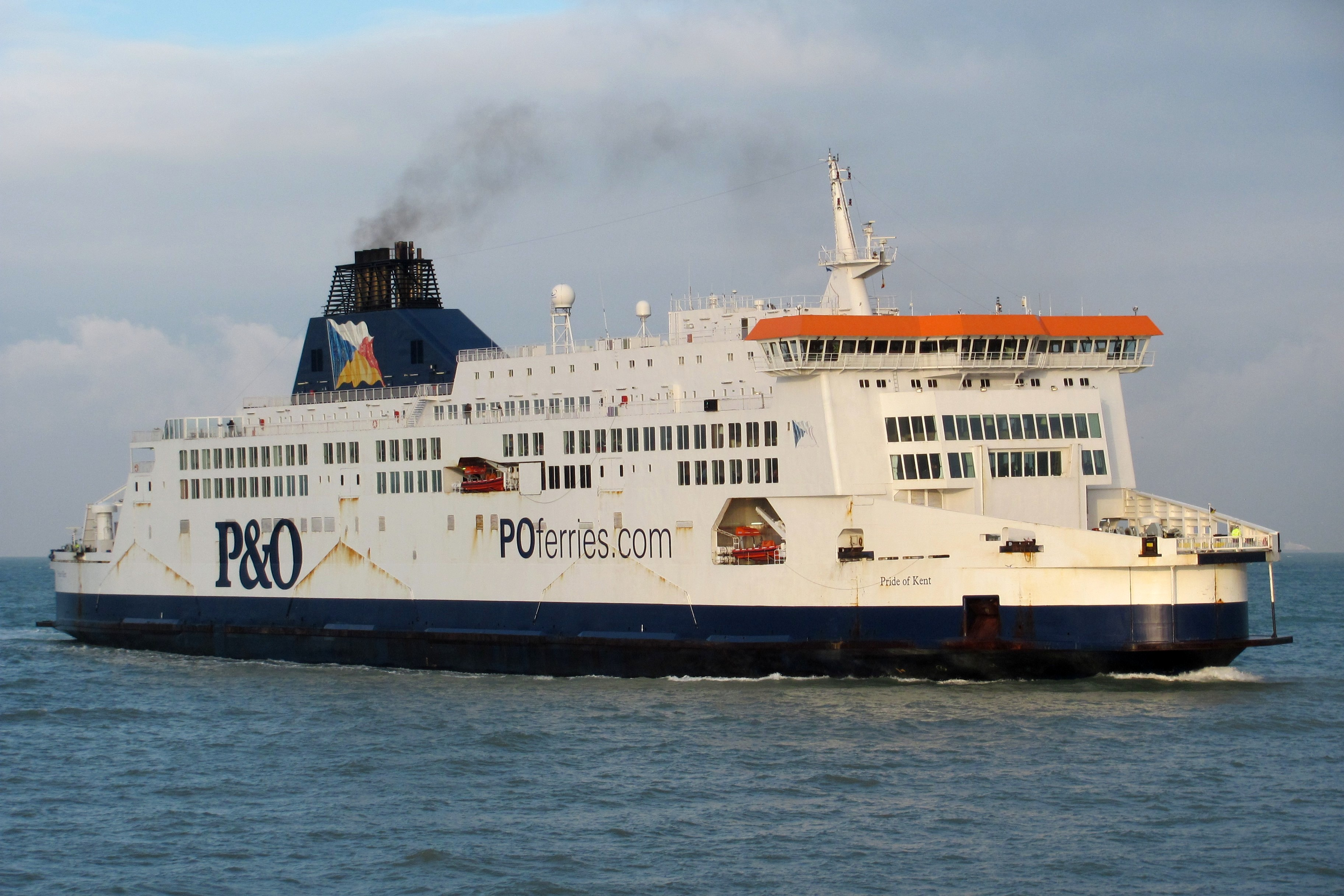
- Pride of Kent approaching Calais

History
- Name: 1992–2004: European Highway; 2003–2023: Pride of Kent
- Owner: 1993–1998: P&O European Ferries; 1998–2002: P&O Stena Line; 2002–2023: P&O Ferries
- Operator: 1993–1998: P&O European Ferries; 1998–2002: P&O Stena Line; 2002–2023: P&O Ferries
- Port of registry: 1992–2019: Dover, United Kingdom; 2019–2023: Limassol, Cyprus
- Route: 1992–2002: Dover-Zeebrugge; 2003–2023: Dover-Calais
- Builder: Schichau Unterweser, Germany
- Yard number: 1073
- Launched: 14 December 1991
- Completed: 12 June 1992
- Maiden voyage: 16 June 1992
- Out of service: 4 June 2023
- Identification: IMO number: 9015266
- Fate: Scrapped in Aliağa, Türkiye

General characteristics
- Tonnage: 1992–2002: 22,986 GT; 2003–present: 30,365 GT
- Length: 179.7 m (589 ft 7 in)
- Beam: 28.3 m (92 ft 10 in)
- Draft: 6.27 m (20 ft 7 in)
- Installed power: 4 x Sulzer 8ZA40S diesels
- Propulsion: Two controllable pitch propellers
- Speed: 21 knots (39 km/h; 24 mph)
- Capacity: 1992–2002: 200 passengers; 124 15 m (49 ft) freight vehicles; 2003–present: 2,000 passengers; 650 passenger vehicles or 120 15 m freight vehicles

MS Pride of Kent was a cross-channel ferry operated by P&O Ferries, it operated on the Dover to Calais route from 2003 until its retirement in June 2023. Before that, between 1992 and 2002, it had operated on the Dover to Zeebrugge route.

== History ==
Originally built as European Highway in 1991 and was a sister ship to Pride of Canterbury, and European Seaway. Originally servicing Zeebrugge, like Pride of Canterbury, she was converted in 2003 before re-entering service on the Dover to Calais route as Pride of Kent.

=== Project Darwin ===
With the ending of the P&O Stena Line agreement, newly formed P&O Ferries announced that the ex Zeebrügge freight vessels European Highway and European Pathway would be rebuilt at the German Shipyard of Lloyd Werft. On completion of their rebuilds, they would be placed on the premier Dover-Calais service, replacing PO Kent (ex-Spirit of Free Enterprise, Pride of Kent, then POSL Kent) and PO Canterbury (ex-Stena Fantasia). This move became widely known by its P&O in-house code name, Project Darwin. Key features of the converted ships were:

- Passenger capacity up from 200 to 2,000
- More than 5,000 square metres (54,000 sq ft) of passenger accommodation
- Fifty extra crew cabins
- Better manoeuvrability

European Pathway was to leave for Bremerhaven on 1 December 2002, followed later in the month by European Highway. The rebuilt ferries were to enter service in April and May 2003 respectively.

=== Return to service ===
On 10 December 2017, the ferry ran aground in the Port of Calais during routine departure manoeuvres in high winds. The vessel was later refloated at high tide with assistance from harbour tugs commandeered from the Port of Dunkirk. On 12 December 2017, the vessel made her way to Dunkirk for an emergency dry docking for repairs for a damaged shaft seal and gearbox.

In early 2019, the Pride of Kent, like all P&O vessels on the Dover-to-Calais route, had been flagged out to Cyprus, a measure explained by the company as motivated by tax advantages in view of Brexit. She was registered in Limassol until being scrapped in 2023.

On 21 March 2022 Transport Secretary Grant Shapps announced that he would require P&O Ferries to rename Pride of Kent and other ships on P&O the fleet which carry British names if the company was found to have breached employment regulations following the summary dismissal without notice via Zoom of 800 British seafarers which were to be replaced with cheaper overseas agency workers. On 24 March 2022, P&O Ferries CEO Peter Hebblethwaite confirmed that the management of the company illegally fired 800 British seafarers so it was expected that this ship would have its name changed as Shapps announced three days previously.

=== Seizure by MCA ===
On the evening of 28 March 2022, the Maritime & Coastguard Agency announced that Pride of Kent had been detained at the Port of Dover following an inspection. The ship was declared "unfit to sail" following an inspection that P&O had hoped would allow the ship to sail without passengers or cargo. This followed P&O's sacking of 800 seafarers earlier in the month and replacing the crew with agency staff.

On 4 June she completed her final crossing from Calais to Dover before being taken out of service to allow its crew to be trained on the ship's replacement, P&O Pioneer. Pride of Kent was moored at Tilbury from 14 July 2023 before being sold for recycling in Aliağa, Turkey departing on 9 October 2023 and arriving on 23 October 2023.

== Layout ==
Pride of Kent had six 'active' decks - cardeck 3 freight and cars, cardeck 5 freight and cars, cardeck 6 cars only, deck 7 & 8 passenger facilities and deck 9 outside deck area. The ship was both divided vertically (as decks) and horizontally, into 3 ventilation zones, with stairs assigned the colours red, yellow, orange, green and blue. There was three passenger lifts from the main and car decks to the passenger facilities. Her onboard facilities included (amongst others) several lounges, a self-service cafeteria, two cafés, a restaurant, and a bar. There was also open decks on levels 8 and 9.

== Sister ships ==
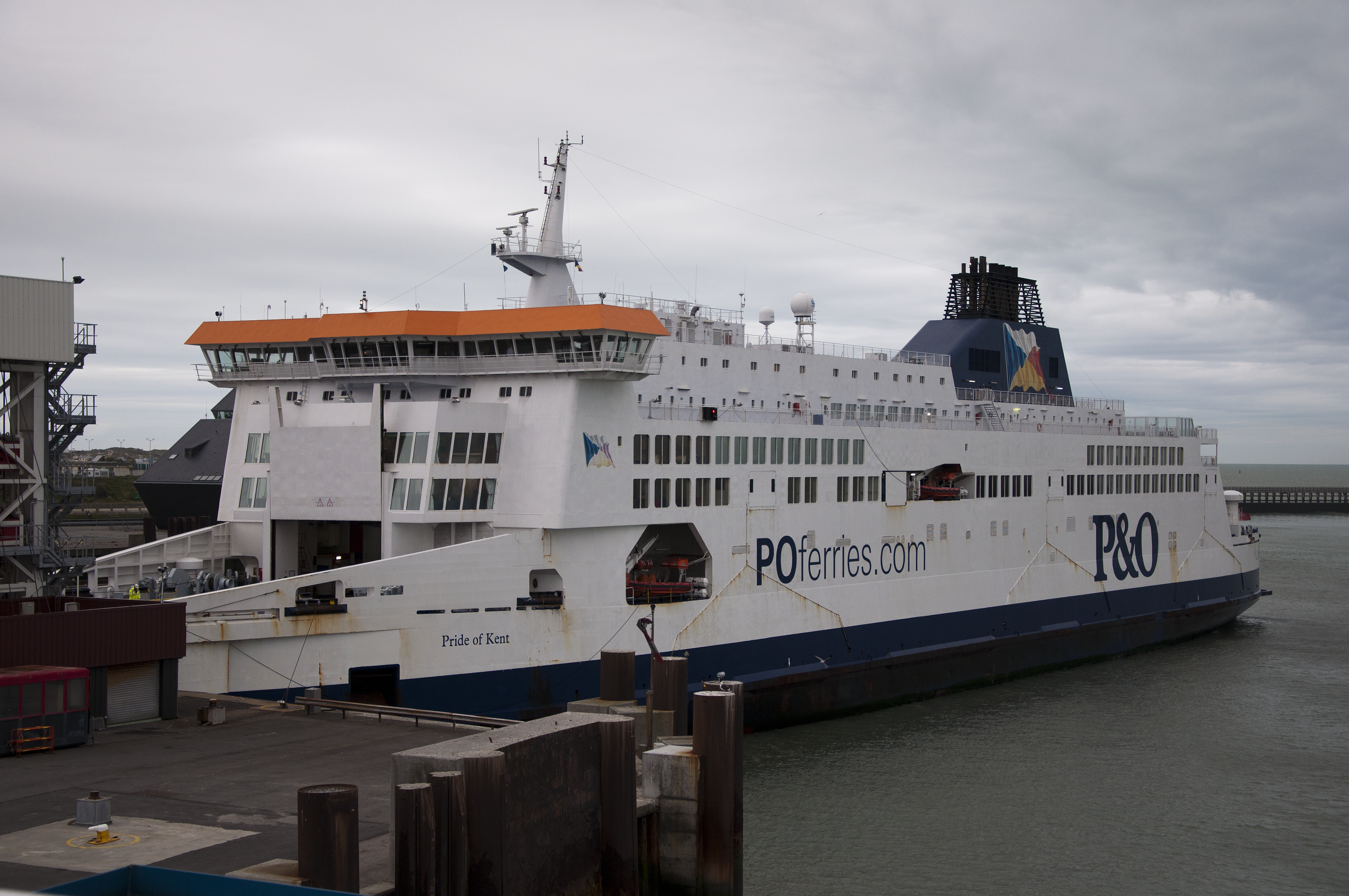
Pride of Kent docked at Calais

As built, Pride of Kent was identical to European Seaway and European Pathway. The fourth 'European Class' freight ferry was converted to a multi-purpose vessel for the Dover-Calais route and named MS Pride of Burgundy, though she still retained a number of similarities. Following conversion to multi-purpose ship Pride of Kent was nearly identical to the MS Pride of Canterbury.

- MS European Seaway

Pride of Kent and Pride of Canterbury were commonly known as the 'Darwin Twins' or 'Darwins' after the project name given by P&O to the conversion of the ships.
