= Isle of Innisfree (ship) =

Three ships have been named Isle of Innisfree:

- Stena Nautica in service under this name 1992–1995
- Kaitaki, in service under this name 1995–2002
- Isle of Innisfree (1991), in service under this name from 2021
