= P&O Stena Line =

UK ferry line

- Founded: 1998
- Defunct: 2002
- Successor: P&O Ferries
- Headquarters: Dover, UK
- Area served: England, France
- Services: Passenger transportation, Freight transportation
- Parent: 60% P&O Ferries / 40% Stena Line

P&O Stena Line was a British ferry operator. Formed in 1998 after the merger of P&O European Ferries (Dover) Ltd and the Dover and Newhaven operations of Stena Line, it was subsumed into P&O Ferries in 2002 after P&O bought out Stena's ownership share.

== History ==
The idea for a joint service was initially put forward in July 1996 and in October of the same year signed a Memorandum of Understanding for the merger of their ferry interests on the Short Sea routes. The go ahead was given to the merger towards the end of 1997 by UK, French and EU authorities and the new company began on 10 March 1998 with joint livery being officially unveiled the day before. Ownership of the new company was 60/40 in favour of P&O with all shore and sea management performed by P&O. Voting rights between the two companies were 50/50.

Both P&O and Stena also put various building assets into the merger. An example of which was P&O Stena Line's "Central Preparation" kitchens in the western docks, and their training centre (both ex-British Rail buildings). Channel House, P&O's Dover headquarters were leased from P&O Corporate in London to P&O Stena Line.

The Newhaven-Dieppe service was closed in early 1999. P&O Stena was replaced on the route by Transmanche Ferries and Hoverspeed.

In April 2002, P&O announced its intention to buy out the 40% stake in P&O Stena Line owned by Stena and this was completed by August. P&O Stena Line then became part of P&O Ferries.

== Ships ==
On completion of the merger, P&O European Ferries transferred eight vessels into the newly formed company:

- Pride of Bruges
- Pride of Burgundy
- Pride of Calais
- Pride of Dover
- Pride of Kent
- European Highway
- European Pathway
- European Seaway

The first five being ROPAX ships sailing Dover to Calais, the last three being dedicated Freight only RORO vessels sailing Dover to Zeebrugge.

Stena Line transferred six vessels into the newly formed company:

- Stena Antrim
- Stena Cambria
- Stena Empereur
- Stena Fantasia
- Stena Invicta
- Stena Lynx III

The first two vessels were sailing on the Newhaven to Dieppe route, the following three vessels on Dover to Calais, and the fastcraft Lynx III was a multipurpose HSC craft operating primarily from Newhaven, but also capable having done so in the past operating from Dover.

(The name Lynx is rooted in the company's past when operating as Stena Sealink Line – the company's first two HSC Craft were named Stena SeaLynx I and Stena SeaLynx II.)

It was decided due to the freight capacity of the Stena Invicta that she would be unviable in a service that had to cut its tonnage down as part of the merger agreements, so she was laid up in France awaiting charter and never saw active service with P&OSL. There was speculation that she would return to service with the company during the annual drydocking periods to serve as a relief vessel, but this never happened. Stena Antrim was also withdrawn immediately and was laid up until being sold.

Initially, the P&O Stena Line fleet was made up of 12 active vessels, these were:

Multi-purpose vessels

- Pride of Bruges later P&OSL Picardy
- Pride of Burgundy later P&OSL Burgundy
- Pride of Calais later P&OSL Calais
- Pride of Dover later P&OSL Dover
- Pride of Kent later P&OSL Kent
- Stena Cambria
- Stena Empereur later P&OSL Provence
- Stena Fantasia later P&OSL Canterbury

Freight ferries

- European Seaway
- European Pathway
- European Highway

Fastcraft

- Elite

While all Dover vessels initially kept their pre-merger names, they were gradually changed during each vessel's annual refit and the P&OSL prefix was adopted in 1999 replacing Pride of and Stena prefixes. As a result, Stena Fantasia and Stena Empereur received new names of P&OSL Canterbury and P&OSL Provence respectively.

At Newhaven the Stena Lynx III was renamed Elite in advance of the merger, Stena Cambria kept its name until the closure of the Newhaven-Dieppe service at the start of 1999. The Elite fastcraft was returned to Stena Line and regained its original name, the Stena Cambria was sold.

It was originally intended that P&OSL Picardy would transfer to POSL's Newhaven-Dieppe route. It was planned that a central loading ramp between the upper and lower vehicle decks would be fabricated and fitted, as Dover vessels operate with two loading ramps, whilst many other ports only operate with one. However, this did not occur and the planned transfer never took place.

The P&OSL Picardy remained on the Dover-Calais route until 2001, and then spent several months laid up in France before being sold to a smaller rival firm operating from Ramsgate, TEF Shipping. Today she is the only one of the original three Spirit Class vessels still sailing in UK waters. The other active sister ship, P&OSL Kent is now sailing for a Greek operator. The third vessel was the ill-fated Herald of Free Enterprise that capsized off the port of Zeebrugge in the late 1980s.

During 1998, P&O Stena chartered Stena Royal for use on the Dover-Zeebrugge freight service. The ship was later renamed and refitted P&OSL Aquitaine.

The fleet remained the same until the purchase of Stena Line's share in the company by P&O in 2002. An announcement was made that the Dover-Zeebrugge service would close but the actual closure occurred under P&O Ferries management in December 2002.

== Brands ==
P&O Stena introduced the Brand World concept now found on many of the current P&O Ferries fleet. Finnegan Consultancy Group developed and implemented the original Brand World strategy which brought about a standard image across the fleet.

The brands were:

- Club Class

Executive quiet lounge, not previously found on the former Stena Line vessels.

- Langan's Brasserie

Replaced the waiter service restaurants on the Dover fleet.

- Harbour Coffee Company

Café

- NYC Deli

Sandwich outlet

- First Base Burgers

Fast-food outlet/burger bar

- International Food Court

Self-service restaurant.

- Silverstones Bar

A Formula 1 based Sports Bar and Lounge. Features large scale models of F1 cars and general F1 memorabilia from Silverstone Circuit.

- Horizon Lounge

Lounge area normally with a bar or Harbour Coffee Company outlet.

- Coca-Cola Megadrome

Video games arcade

As of 2007, P&O Ferries have begun removing some of their familiar Brand World theming throughout their fleet. The three main affected brands are:

- Silverstones Bar has been replaced with "the bar"
- Horizons Lounge, now known as "the family lounge"
- Harbour Coffee Company has been changed to "the café"

== Former P&O Stena operations today ==
The Dover-Calais service has essentially returned to its pre-merger P&O European Ferries form with no former Stena Line ships remaining. Ships that were to remain in the P&O Ferries fleet either returned to their original "Pride of" names (except PO Canterbury and PO Kent) or gained the prefix. European Pathway and European Highway were converted into multi-purpose vessels and became Pride of Canterbury and Pride of Kent respectively replacing PO Canterbury and PO Kent which after the end of P&O Stena Line lost the '&' and 'SL' from their names. Pride of Provence and Pride of Aquitaine were later withdrawn as part of the review of P&O Ferries operations announced in September 2004.

The Newhaven-Dieppe service was run by Transmanche Ferries but the service has been put out to tender in early 2007 as part of the French operators parent company plan. The successful bid was submitted by Paris-based Louis Drefus (LD) Lines, who also operate the Portsmouth - Le Havre service.

== Use of the P&O Stena logo today ==
The POSL logo survives today, albeit across the other side of the globe from the English Channel, in Singapore. Austen Maritime Services is purportedly the last joint P&O/Stena operation, and although nothing to do with the Ferries operations, retains the logo. P&O has since sold its shares in Austen Maritime Services to Northern Marine Austen Maritime Services no longer uses the P&O Stena Logo
