= SS Mahratta (1917) =

Coordinates: 51°14′45″N 01°30′05″E

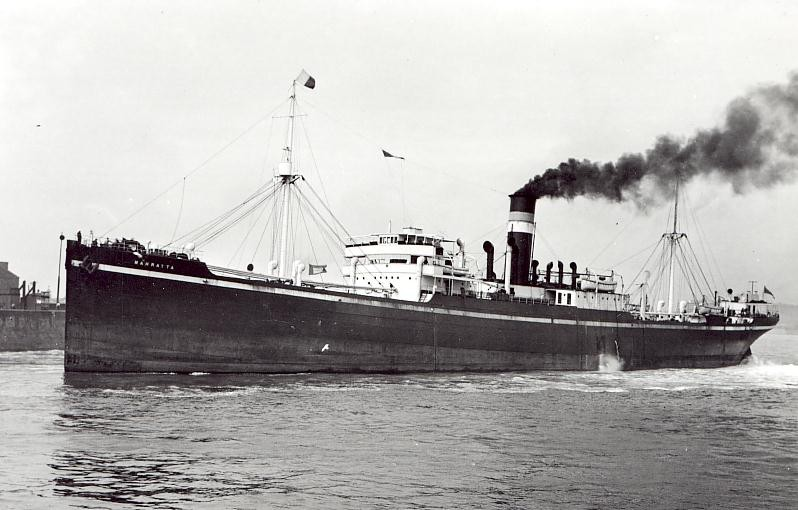

History

United Kingdom
- Name: SS Mahratta
- Owner: T & J Brocklebank Ltd; (Brocklebank Line)
- Builder: Robert Duncan & Co, Port Glasgow
- Yard number: 328
- Launched: 20 October 1917
- Out of service: 6 October 1939
- Home port: Liverpool
- Identification: Official Number 140545; Code letters JRSC
- Fate: Wrecked on Goodwin Sands

General characteristics
- Tonnage: 6,690 grt
- Length: 445 ft (135.64 m)
- Beam: 58 ft 2 in (17.73 m)
- Depth: 31 ft 2 in (9.50 m)
- Propulsion: 1 x Dunsmuir & Jackson Ltd triple expansion engine of 702 hp (523 kW)

SS Mahratta was a Brocklebank Line steamship launched in 1917. She ran aground in the English Channel on the Goodwin Sands in October 1939. She was the second and final Brocklebank Line ship with this name. The first Mahratta suffered a similar fate in 1909. After Mahratta broke up, the ship was found to be resting on top of the first Mahratta.

== History ==
SS Mahratta was launched on 20 October 1917. Its name is an old spelling of Maratha. On 6 April 1936, SS Matheran lost her propeller off Port Sudan. It was decided that Mahratta would tow Matheran the 718 nautical miles (1,330 km) to Suez where another ship would tow Matheran to Alexandria for repairs. Despite Matheran being a bigger ship than Mahratta, the tow was completed at an average speed of 7.32 knots (13.56 km/h).

=== Shipwreck ===
On 9 October 1939, Mahratta was inbound to London from Calcutta when she ran aground on the Goodwins. Mahratta had originally been bound for Liverpool but received new orders at Gibraltar to sail to London. Mahratta left Gibraltar as part of Convoy HG 1 on 26 September 1939. In blackout conditions she ran aground on Fork Spit, less than a mile away from where the first Mahratta had run aground. The Deal hoveller Lady Haig was given charge of the salvage operations. A tug attempted to move Mahratta into deeper water the next day, but the plates on her port side buckled and by nightfall Mahratta had broken in two. The crew of Mahratta were transferred to the steamer Challenge in four trips. On the third trip, a lifeboat full of luggage salvaged from Mahratta was taken in tow, but a large wave almost capsized Lady Haig and the lifeboat was cast adrift after the ten crew from Mahratta on it were rescued. They were landed at Dover.

== Pride of Canterbury ferry incident ==
On 31 January 2008, the roll on roll off passenger ferry Pride of Canterbury operated by P&O Ferries struck the wreck of Mahratta while manoeuvring in severe weather into a holding position in The Downs. The ferry suffered extensive damage to her port propeller and had to be assisted to berth in Dover. It is not clear whether the wreck site named in the MAIB report is that of the first SS Mahratta or the later vessel.
