= Blue Wave Harmony =

Ship built in 1991

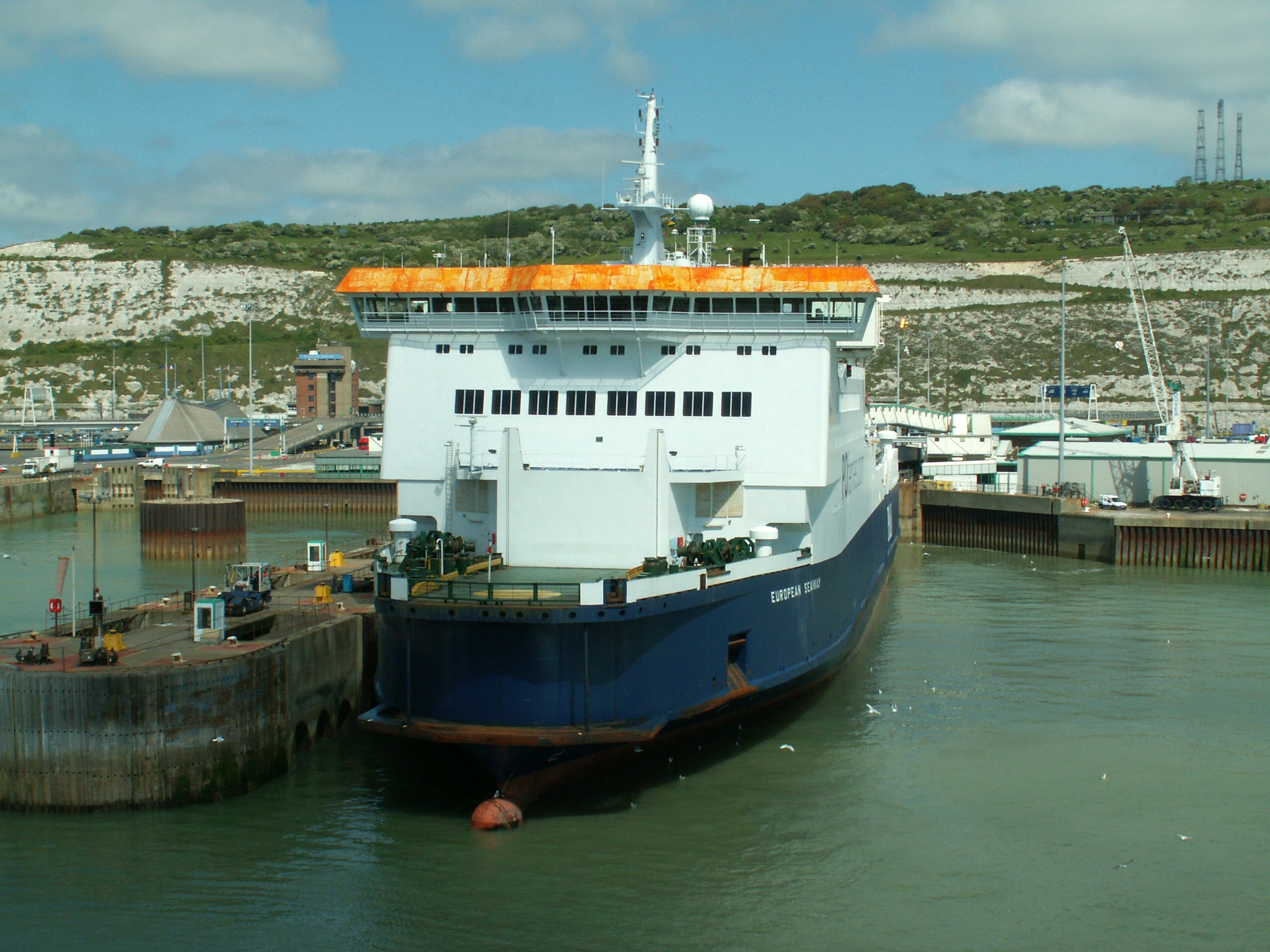

History
- Name: 1991–2022: European Seaway; 2022–present: Sea Anatolia
- Owner: 1991–1998: P&O European Ferries; 1998–2002: P&O Stena Line; 2002–2022: P&O Ferries; 2022–present: Sea Lines
- Operator: 1991–1998: P&O European Ferries; 1998-2002: P&O Stena Line; 2002–2012: P&O Ferries; 2012: Centrica Renewable Energy; 2012–2022: P&O Ferries; 2022–present: Sea Lines
- Port of registry: 1991–2019: Dover, United Kingdom; 2019–2022: Limassol, Cyprus; 2022–present: Panama City, Panama
- Route: San Juan - Santo Domingo (past) Port of Spain - Scarborough (current)
- Builder: Schichau Seebeckwerft, Germany
- Yard number: 1075
- Laid down: 15 October 1990
- Launched: 20 April 1991
- Completed: 2 October 1991
- Maiden voyage: 7 October 1991
- Identification: IMO number: 9007283
- Status: In service

General characteristics
- Tonnage: 22,986 GT
- Length: 179.7 m (589 ft 7 in)
- Beam: 28.3 m (92 ft 10 in)
- Draft: 6.27 m (20 ft 7 in)
- Installed power: 4 × Sulzer 8ZA40S diesel engines producing 5,280 kW (7,080 hp) each at 510 rpm 3 × Sulzer 6ATL 25H 1150 kW diesel auxiliary generator engines
- Propulsion: 2 × Lips 4-bladed controllable pitch propellers 2 × Lips 1200 kW transverse bow thrusters
- Speed: 21 knots (39 km/h; 24 mph)
- Capacity: 200 passengers; 94 cabins; 124 15 m (49 ft) freight vehicles; 1925 lanemetres freight vehicles
- Crew: 35

Blue Wave Harmony is a ferry formerly known as MS Sea Anatolia and originally launched in 1991 for P&O as European Seaway. From Spring 2023 it was owned by Blue Wave Corporation.

== History ==
European Seaway was the first of four freight ferries ordered by P&O European Ferries in the early 1990s for the Dover to Zeebrugge service. She remained on the route until 2000 when she alternated between the Calais and Zeebrugge routes.

In 2003 she was moved to Dover – Calais full-time after the Zeebrugge service ceased but was laid up at the end of 2003 due to over capacity. Following a refit at A&P, Falmouth in December 2003, she was used as an accommodation vessel for fleet overhauls at Falmouth and listed for sale. In June 2004 she was moved to Birkenhead for further lay up but was withdrawn from the sale list. At the beginning of 2005, it was returned to the Dover to Calais route. Until August 2010 she did not stray from the Dover to Calais route except for refits and during a short period during March 2006 when she operated six sailings to Zeebrugge after the collapse of a berth at Calais.

In September 2011 she was laid up again, but brought back into service in November 2011 following the SeaFrance suspension. From late April until October 2012, she was chartered to Centrica Renewable Energy as an accommodation vessel for technicians working on the Lynn and Inner Dowsing Wind Farms. This charter required the addition of lifting equipment, boarding ladders and hull access doors to the exterior of the vessel. She then returned to Dover to Calais service until April 2013, when she was again laid up in Tilbury.

European Seaway conducted its duties as a hotel vessel for a European utility company: RWE when building the Nordsee-Ost offshore wind farm, therefore European Seaway was chartered after successful audit.

European Seaway returned to the Dover to Calais route for the peak season from the beginning of August 2015 being expected to make eight sailings a day. It supplemented P&O Ferries' existing five ship fleet on Dover to Calais services which makes up to 50 sailings a day.

In 2017, European Seaway visited Northern Ireland for the first time as a refit relief vessel for both European Highlander and European Causeway. As she was built as a freighter, she did not normally carry passengers other than freight drivers, however during her spell operating from Larne in 2017, she carried passengers and cars as well as a limited number of foot passengers.

European Seaway arrived at A&P Falmouth at the end of April 2019 ahead of covering European Highlander and European Causeway from the middle of May 2019. Whilst at Falmouth, her homeport changed from Dover to Limassol in line with the rest of the Dover-based P&O fleet. This was the third time the vessel had visited a shipyard in the past ten months with a dry dock at Damen, Dunkirk in December 2018 following an extended dry docking and refit between 20 June and 11 July 2018 at Remontowa, Gdańsk. Whilst at Remontowa, she was stripped back to bare metal and re painted with the then-current P&O livery. During the refurbishment, the interior was refreshed with an additional toilet block added. This was done due to the last stint on the Northern Channel with passengers having to use toilet facilities in unoccupied cabins.

In July 2021, she was moored on the River Fal just north of King Harry Ferry, having been temporarily removed from service due to the COVID-19 pandemic.

In January 2022, she was sold to Sea Lines and renamed Sea Anatolia. In January of that year she left Falmouth under tow for Yalov for refit, including the installation of a stern ramp and internal ramps between her decks. On 15 February 2022, she was registered under the flag of Panama.

In February 2023, it was rumoured that the ship was charterted to Maritima Peregar SA, and began sailing between Málaga, Spain, and Tanger-Med, Morocco, from 6 March 2023. The Blue Wave Harmony first arrived in El Salvador to initiate scheduled ferry services in early August 2023 to Costa Rica a few days later. In Central American service configuration, only 73 cabins would be offered for passenger service.

== Sister ships ==
- MS Pride of Burgundy
- MS Pride of Canterbury (formerly European Pathway)
- MS Pride of Kent (formerly European Highway)

As built the ship was identical to European Highway and European Pathway. The fourth 'European Class' freight ferry was converted to a multi-purpose vessel for the Dover-Calais route and named MS Pride of Burgundy though she still retained a number of similarities. European Seaway is now the only member of the class in 'as built' condition following the conversion of European Pathway and European Highway, now MS Pride of Kent and MS Pride of Canterbury respectively, to multi-purpose ships for the Dover-Calais route.
