= Elite Jet =

Ship built in 1996

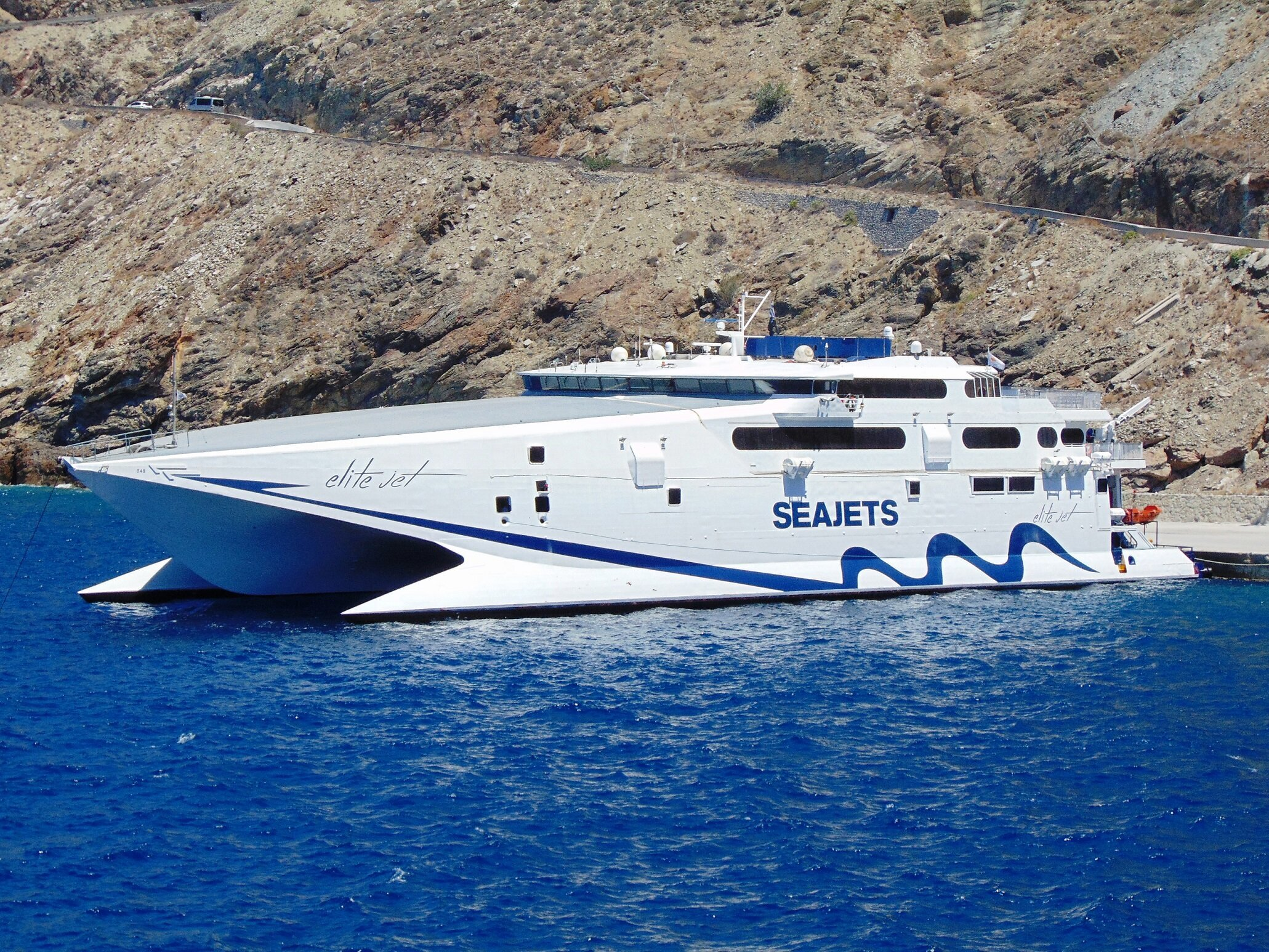
- Elite Jet in Santorini

History
- Name: 1996–1998: Stena Lynx III; 1998–1998: Elite; 1998–1998: P&O Stena Elite; 1998–2003: Stena Lynx III; 2003–2004: Elite; 2004–2011: Stena Lynx III; 2011–2012: Sunflower 2; 2012–2020: Orange 1; 2020–2023: Rapidlink Jet; 2023–present: Elite Jet
- Owner: 2020–present: Seajets
- Operator: 1998–1998: P&O Stena Line; 1998–2011: Stena Line; 2011–2020: Dae A Express; 2020–present: Seajets
- Port of registry: Limassol, Cyprus (2020–present)
- Builder: Incat, Tasmania, Australia
- Yard number: 040
- Laid down: 2 July 1995
- Launched: 8 May 1996
- Completed: 18 May 1996
- Maiden voyage: 1996
- In service: 1996
- Identification: IMO number: 9129328
- Status: Operational

General characteristics
- Class & type: Incat 81m WPC
- Tonnage: 4,113 GT
- Length: 80.6 m (264 ft 5 in)
- Beam: 26.0 m (85 ft 4 in)
- Draught: 3.1 m (10 ft 2 in)
- Installed power: 4 × Ruston 16RK270 MkII diesel engines
- Capacity: 660 passengers; 153 cars

Elite Jet is a high-speed ferry operated by Seajets and operated on Stena Line's Holyhead - Dún Laoghaire route and seasonally on the Fishguard–Rosslare service. She was marketed by Stena Line as the Stena Express. In 2019 was sold by Seajets and underwent repairs at Salamis. The ship was set to be launched on the Santorini – Rethymno route in 2023.

== Design and construction ==
Elite Jet was built in 1996 by Incat in Australia, and is one of a series of wave-piercing catamarans to be constructed by the company. Construction began in May 1995 and was completed in May 1996.

== Career ==
She briefly served on the English Channel for P&O Stena Line as the Elite.

In 1998 she was transferred to Stena Line's Fishguard - Rosslare service and renamed Stena Lynx III. She operated this route on a seasonal basis, spending the winter months laid-up, usually at Birkenhead. Stena Line purchased the vessel in 2004. The same year, Stena Lynx III developed serious technical problems, and spent a large part of the summer season out of service.

She returned to her seasonal role on the southern Irish Sea on 14 May 2009, for another summer operating alongside Stena Europe.

She operated the Holyhead – Dún Laoghaire route running twice daily from 15 March 2010 until the end of May 2010, when Stena Explorer operated the route with one round trip per day. She was then laid up in Dún Laoghaire until 29 June 2010 when the vessel moved to Rosslare. She operated her seasonal summer route from 10 July 2010 until September 2010.

On 15 September 2010, she once again returned to operate the Holyhead–Dún Laoghaire service, after Stena Explorer was withdrawn from the route for the winter season of 2010. Stena Lynx III operated the route until 9 January 2011, in which she then had her 2011 refit. She then returned to Holyhead, before moving to Dún Laoghaire for lay up until June 2011. At the end of June 2011, she left Dún Laoghaire to begin her summer seasonal service on the Rosslare – Fishguard route. The ferry began her summer service on the Rosslare – Fishguard route on 1 July, and ended on 4 September 2011, she then returned to Dún Laoghaire for lay up.

In October 2011 the Stena Lynx III was renamed Sunflower 2. While en route to Asia she suffered a major engine failure in the Bay of Biscay. After this incident she was repaired at La Coruna, Spain.

In 2016 she operated in South Korea with the new name Orange 1. In 2017 the ship was chartered by the Government of Trinidad & Tobago for service on the inter-island service between Scarborough and Port of Spain.

In 2019 renamed Rapidlink Jet and was sold by Seajets and moored at Salamis, Greece.

In October 2022, it was announced that the ship will be launched on Santorini – Rethymnon line for the 2023 season, connecting Crete with Cyclades. She set sail on her maiden voyage on 26 May 2023. In May 2023 the ship renamed Elite Jet.
