= MS SuperStar II =

Ship built in 1985

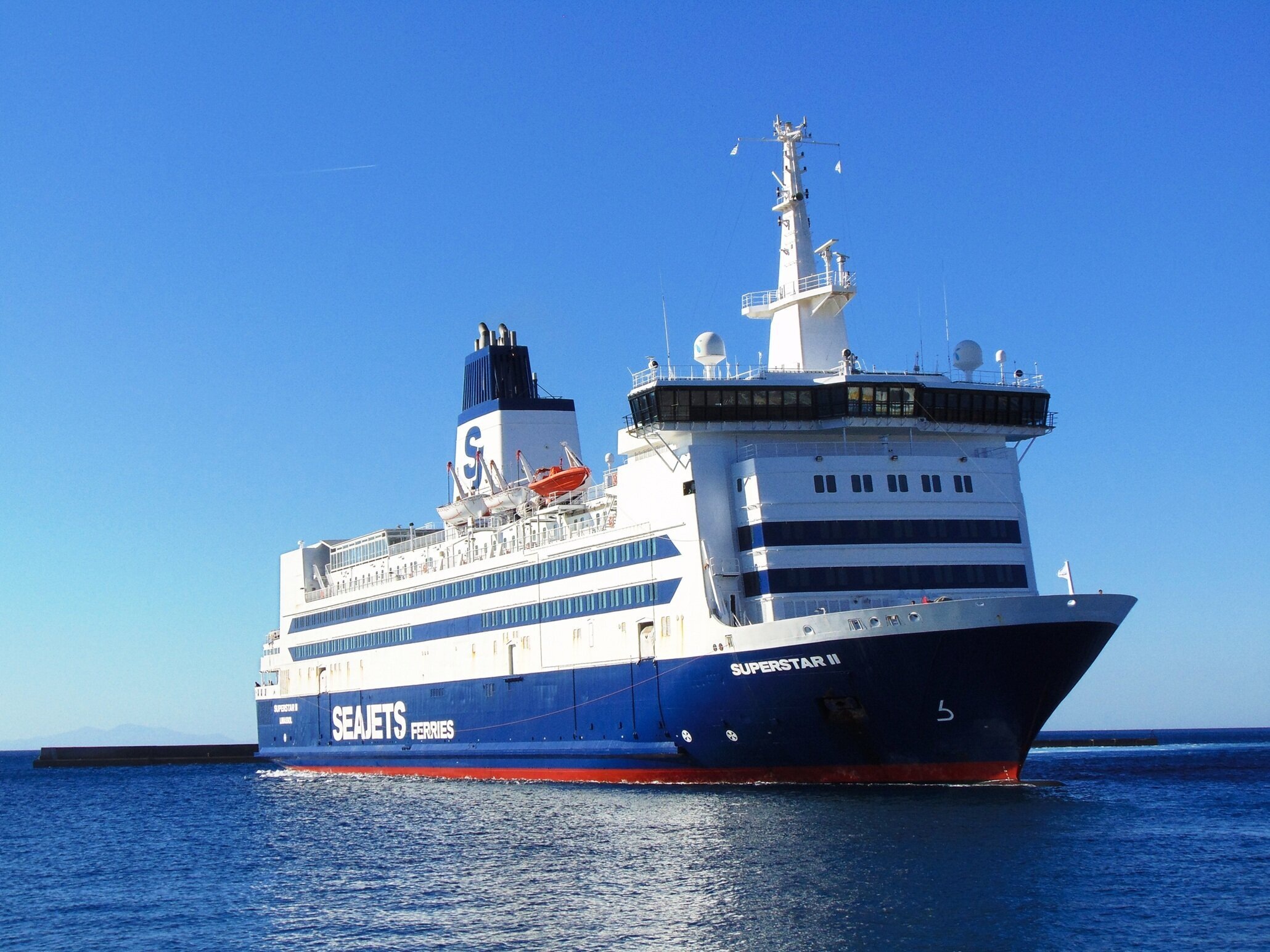
- Superstar II in Tinos

History
- Name: 1985–1991: Peder Paars; 1991–2000: Stena Invicta; 2000–2023: Color Viking; 2023 – present: SuperStar II
- Owner: 1985–1991: DSB Færger; 1991–1999: Stena Line; 1999–2001: P&O Stena Line; 2001-2022: Color Line; 2022 – present: Seajets
- Operator: 1985–1991: DSB Færger; 1991–1998: Sealink Stena Line; 1998: Silja Line; 1998–1999: laid up; 1999–2000: Stena Line; 2000-2022: Color Line; 2022 – present: Seajets
- Port of registry: 1985–1991: Århus, Denmark; 1991–2000: Dover, United Kingdom; 2000–2002: Nassau, Bahamas; 2002–2023: Sandefjord, Norway; 2023 – present: Limassol, Cyprus
- Route: Strömstad—Sandefjord (2000-2022)
- Ordered: September 1983
- Builder: Nakskov Skibsværft, Nakskov, Denmark
- Yard number: 233
- Laid down: 4 May 1984
- Launched: 21 November 1984
- Completed: 1985
- Acquired: 18 October 1985
- Maiden voyage: 1985
- In service: 19 November 1985
- Identification: IMO number: 8317942
- Status: Under refit at Drapetsona.

General characteristics (as built, 1985)
- Type: Ropax ferry
- Tonnage: 11,602 GT; 2,813 DWT
- Length: 134.02 m (439 ft 8 in)
- Beam: 24.61 m (80 ft 9 in)
- Draught: 5.65 m (18 ft 6 in)
- Installed power: 2 × Burmeister & Wain 8L45GB; combined 12480 kW
- Propulsion: Two shafts; controllable pitch propellers; Two bow thrusters and one stern thruster
- Speed: 19 knots (35 km/h; 22 mph) maximum
- Capacity: 1,700 passengers; 148 berths; 370 cars

General characteristics (after 1991 rebuild)
- Tonnage: 19,763 GT; 2,238 DWT
- Length: 137.00 m (449 ft 6 in)
- Beam: 24.61 m (80 ft 9 in)
- Draught: 5.65 m (18 ft 6 in)
- Capacity: 1,460 passengers; 148 berths; 340 cars; 510 lane metres

MS SuperStar II is a ferry owned by the Greek/Cypriot Seajets. It operated on Color Lines service between Sandefjord and Strömstad from 16 June 2000 until 20 November 2022. She was built in 1985 as MS Peder Paars by Nakskov Skibsværft, Nakskov, Denmark for DSB Færger (the ferry division of the Danish State Railways). Between 1991 and 2000 she sailed as MS Stena Invicta for Sealink Stena Line and Stena Line. In 1998 she was chartered to Silja Line under the marketing name MS Wasa Jubilee. In May 2000 Stena Invicta started operating for Color Line and received the name MS Color Viking.

SuperStar II is certified for 2000 passengers and 370 cars.

== Concept and construction ==
In September 1983 DSB Færger ordered two relatively large ferries for service on the intra-Denmark Århus—Kalundborg route from the Nakskov Skibsværft in Nakskov, Denmark. Although ordered by the ferry division of the Danish State Railways, the ships did not have the facilities for transporting trains, but were constructed to transport road freight and passengers. Both ships were named after characters from the works of Ludvig Holberg, a Norwegian-born writer considered to be the father of modern Danish literature. First of the ships, delivered in 1985, was named MS Peder Paars after the poem Peder Paars. The second, delivered a years later, was named MS Niels Klim after the protagonist in Niels Klim's Underground Travels.

== Service history ==
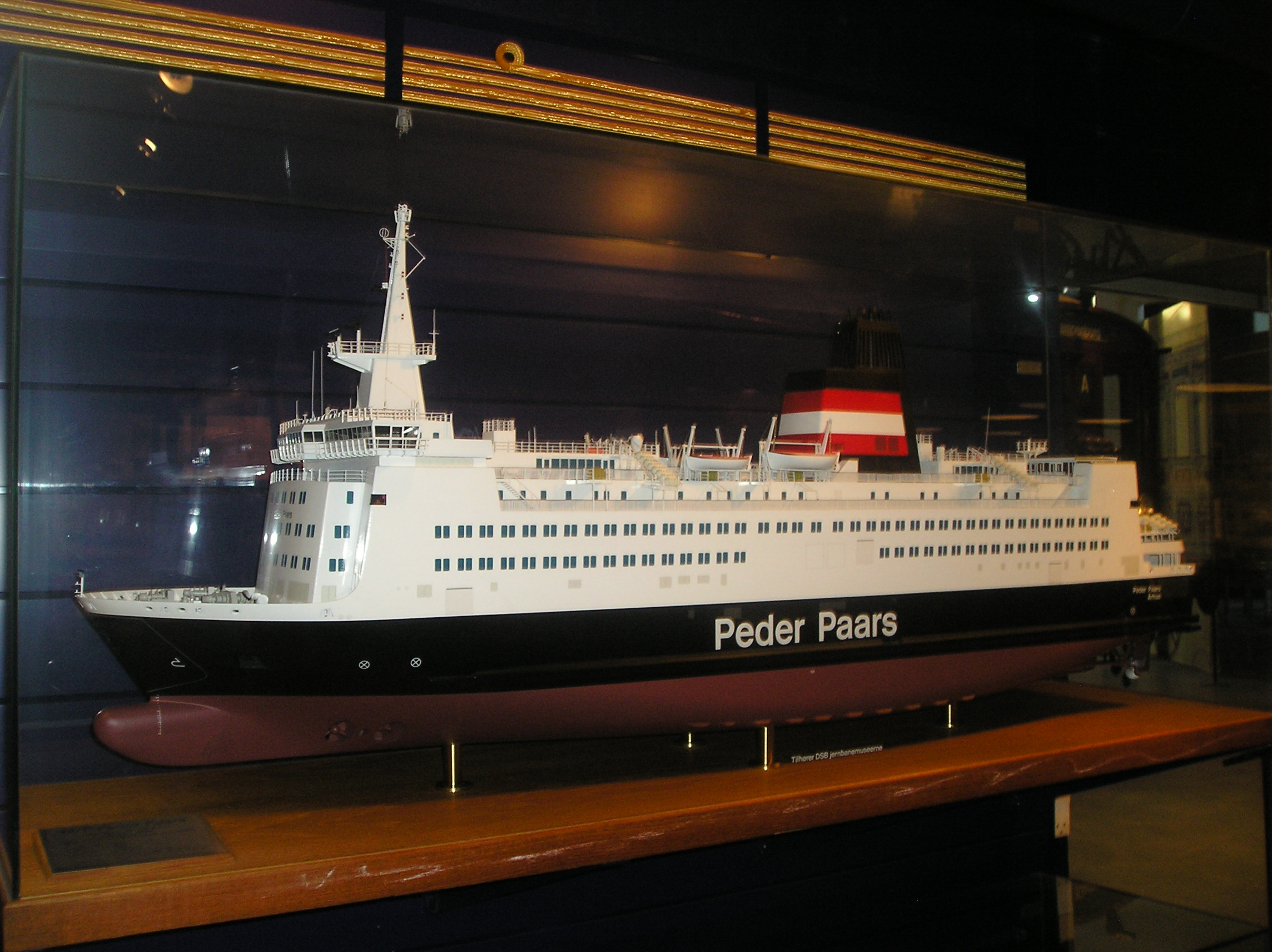
A model of Peder Paars

Peder Paars was delivered to DSB Færger on 18 October 1985, but it was not until a month later that she entered service on the Århus—Kalundborg route. Århus was also her port of registry at the time. She and her sister remained in service for five years, until in October 1990 both ships were sold to Stena Line, to be delivered in May 1991. On 19 May 1991 both Peder Paars and Niels Klim were withdrawn from service, replaced by the notably smaller second-hand ferries MS Ask and MS Urd. The following day Peder Paars was renamed Stena Invicta and sailed to the Schichau-Seebeckswerft shipyard in Bremerhaven, Germany, for rebuilding for service in the English Channel for Stena Line's subsidiary Sealink Stena Line. For this purpose the ship was re-registered in the United Kingdom, with Dover as her homeport. On 8 August 1991 Stena Invicta entered service on the Dover—Calais route.

Following the formation of P&O Stena Line, Stena Invicta was laid up on 18 February 1998. In April of the same year she was chartered to Silja Line of Finland for the duration of the 1998 Northern Hemisphere summer season. Her registered name remained Stena Invicta, but in Silja Line marketing the ship was referred to with the name Wasa Jubilee in honour of the 50th anniversary of ferry operations from Vaasa, Finland. The marketing name Wasa Jubilee was also painted in large letters on the ship's side, alongside the company name. The ship stayed in Vaasa—Umeå service for Silja Line from 20 April until 15 September 1998. The following month Stena Invicta arrived at Zeebrugge, where she was laid up. In November 1999 her registered owners were changed from Stena Line to P&O Stena Line. In December she was chartered to Stena Line U.K., entering service on the Holyhead—Dún Laoghaire route on 12 December 1999. At the end of February 2000 her route was changed to Fishguard—Rosslare, but she was withdrawn from service already on 20 March 2000.

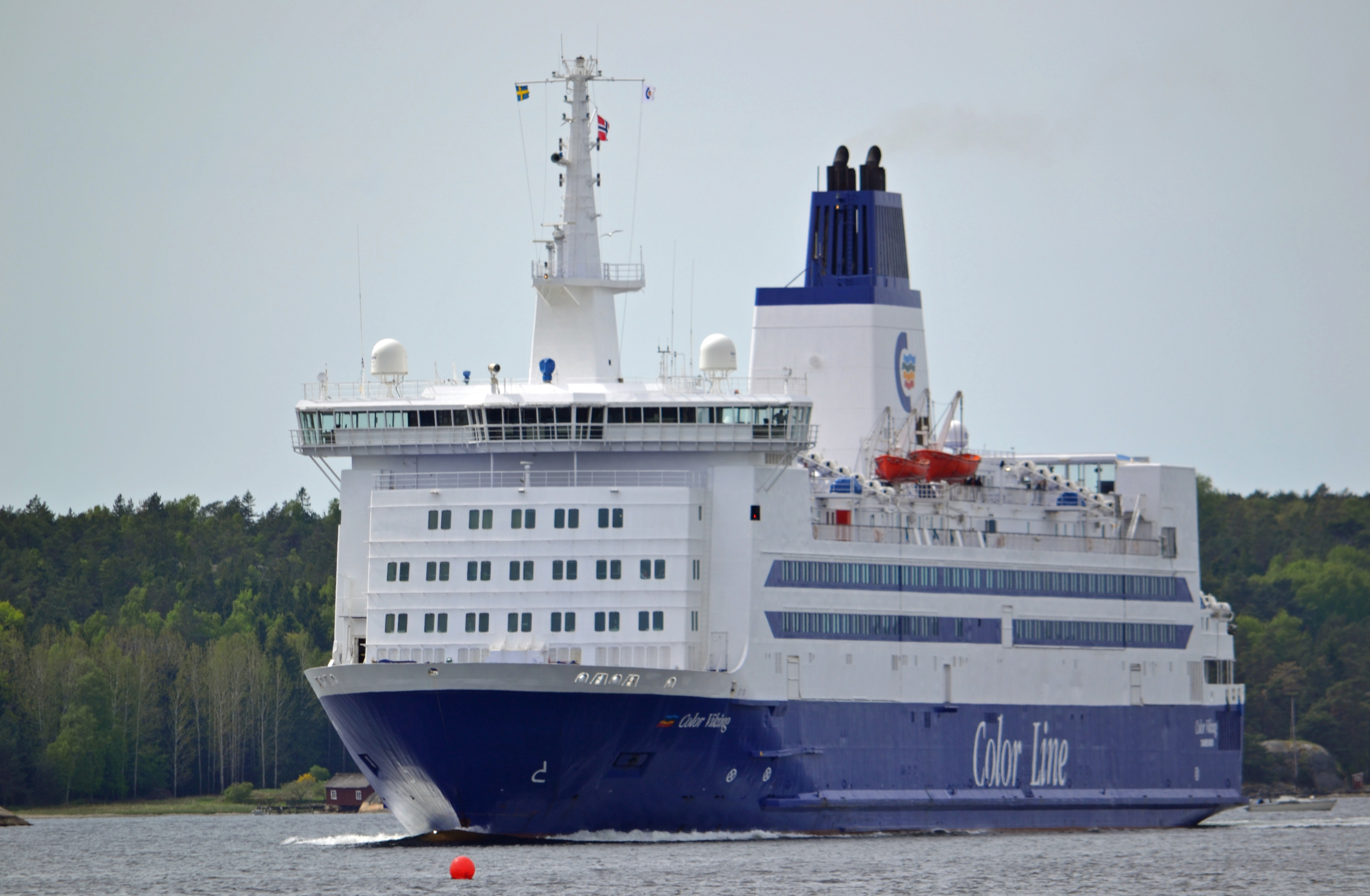
Color Viking

In April 2000 Stena Invicta was chartered to the Norway-based Color Line, with a purchase option included in the charter agreement. The ship was re-registered at Nassau, the Bahamas, rebuilt at Drammen, Norway and renamed Color Viking. On 14 June 2000 the ship entered service on Color Line's Sandefjord—Strömstad service. In May of the following year Color Line utilized their purchase option on the ship. She was subsequently re-registered in Norway, with Sandefjord as her homeport.

In November 2022 Color Line announced that the ship would be pulled from service along with the freight ship Color Carrier on the Oslo-Kiel route due to rising fuel and energy costs.

On 17 February 2023 it was delivered to Seajets and on 23 February it left Sandefjord for the Piraeus shipyards, where it arrived on 4 March and where it underwent major refurbishment works.

== Accidents and Incidents ==
On 30 April 2026, while entering the port of Skopelos, the vessel ran aground on a sandbank. It was operating a scheduled itinerary from Volos to Skiathos, Skopelos, and Alonnisos, carrying 227 passengers and 76 vehicles. The ship was freed with the assistance of the tugboat ''Agios Evdokimos'' and subsequently docked under its own power to safely disembark all passengers and vehicles. Following an inspection and the presentation of a certificate of seaworthiness by its classification society, the local port authority lifted an initial detention order, allowing the vessel to resume its journey to Alonnisos. No injuries or marine pollution were reported.
