= Pride of Kent =

Pride of Kent may refer to:

- Pride of Kent, a scrapped ferry in service under this name 1987–1998 with P&O European Ferries
- Pride of Kent, a scrapped ferry in service under this name 2003–2023 with P&O Ferries
