= MS Eckerö Link =

Swedish RoPax ferry

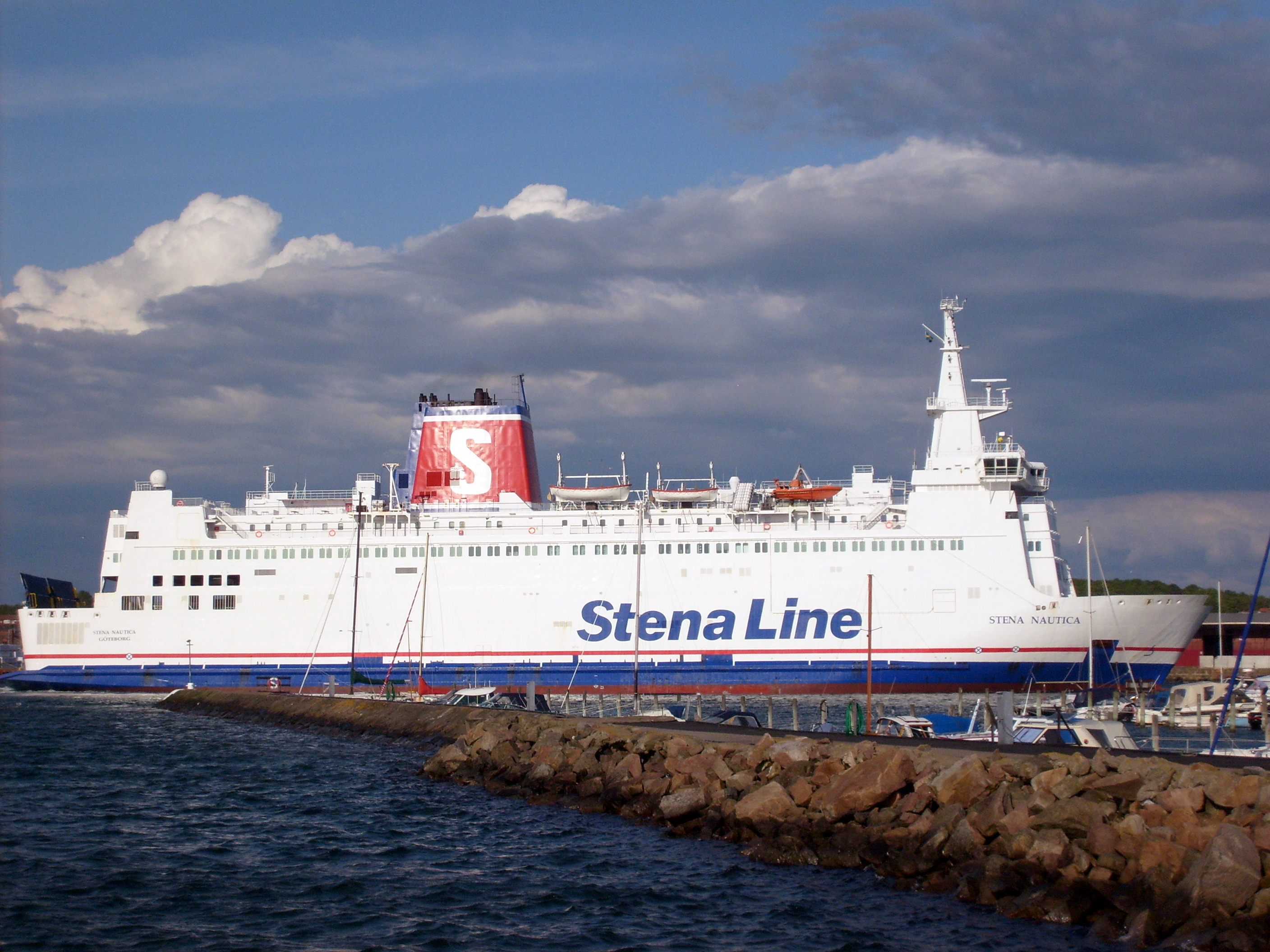

History
- Name: 1986–1991: Niels Klim; 1991–1992: Stena Nautica; 1992–1995: Isle of Innisfree; 1995–1996: Lion King; 1996: Lion King II; 1996–2026: Stena Nautica; 2026-present: Eckerö Link
- Owner: 1986–1991: DSB Färjedivision; 1991-2026: Stena Line; 2026-present: Rederiaktiebolaget Eckerö
- Operator: 1986–1991: DSB Færge; 1992–1995: B&I Line; 1995–1996: Lion Ferry; 1996: Trasmediterranea; 1997: Dutch MoD; 1997: UK MoD; 1997-2026: Stena Line; 2026-present Rederiaktiebolaget Eckerö
- Port of registry: 1985–1991: Århus (Denmark); 1991–1995: Nassau (The Bahamas); 1995–1996: Halmstad (Sweden); 1996–2001: Nassau (The Bahamas); 2001–2026: Gothenburg (Sweden); 2026-present: Grisslehamn (Sweden)
- Route: Långnäs – Naantali
- Builder: Nakskov Skibsværft, Nakskov, Denmark
- Yard number: 234
- Launched: 29 May 1985
- Identification: IMO number: 8317954
- Status: In service

General characteristics (as built, 1986)
- Type: Ropax ferry
- Tonnage: 11,602 GT; 2,813 t DWT
- Length: 134.02 m (439 ft 8 in)
- Beam: 24.61 m (80 ft 9 in)
- Draught: 5.65 m (18 ft 6 in)
- Installed power: 2 × MAN B&W 8L45GB diesels; combined 12480 kW
- Propulsion: 2 controllable pitch propellers; 2 bow thrusters; 1 stern thruster
- Speed: 19 kn (35.19 km/h; 21.86 mph) maximum
- Capacity: 2000 passengers; 148 berths; 330 cars

General characteristics (after 2002 rebuild)
- Tonnage: 19,763 GT
- Length: 135.47 m (444 ft 5 in)
- Beam: 24.61 m (80 ft 9 in)
- Draught: 5.65 m (18 ft 6 in)
- Capacity: ~900 passengers; 148 berths; 337 cars; 1235 lane metres

Eckerö Link is a ro-pax ferry currently in operation between Långnäs and Naantali for Rederiaktiebolaget Eckerö. She was completed in 1986 as MS Niels Klim and served on the DSB Århus – Kalundborg along with her sister Peder Paars until 1991.

== Concept and construction ==
In September 1983 DSB ordered two relatively large ferries for service on the intra-Denmark Århus–Kalundborg route from Nakskov Skibsværft in Nakskov, Denmark. Although ordered by the ferry division of the Danish State Railways, the ships did not have the facilities for transporting trains, but were constructed to transport road freight and passengers. Both ships were named after characters from the works of Ludvig Holberg, a Norwegian-born writer considered to be the father of modern Danish and Norwegian literature. First of the ships, delivered in 1985, was named Peder Paars after the poem Peder Paars. The second, delivered a year later, was named Niels Klim after the protagonist in Niels Klim's Underground Travels.

== Early career ==
That year both ships were taken over by Stena Line. The Peder Paars was renamed Stena Invicta and served on the Dover – Calais route for most of the 90s. The Niels Klim was renamed Stena Nautica but spent most of 1991 laid up in Århus. In 1992, she was chartered to B&I Line for use on their Irish Sea services and was renamed Isle Of Innisfree; Initially she served Pembroke Dock – Rosslare and later Holyhead – Dublin. However, her slow service speed of 17 knots frequently resulted in delays.

== Current operations ==
In 1995, she returned to Stena Line and operated on their Lion Ferry subsidiary between Varberg / Halmstad and Grenå. She has since remained on that route, despite occasional charters, the closure of the Halmstad leg and the incorporation of Lion Ferry into Stena Line.

In 2002, she was rebuilt in order to transport more freight. Her lower passenger deck was converted into another vehicle deck, and her passenger certification was subsequently reduced from 2000 to 653, while her freight capacity increased from 604 lane meters to 1235.

In early 2026, Stena Line decided to close its Halmstad – Grenå route due to profitability challenges, with Stena Nautica completing her final runs on the line on 10 April 2026. Following this, the ship was acquired by Rederiaktiebolaget Eckerö in May 2026. After necessary rebranding and technical preparations, the vessel is scheduled to officially begin serving the Långnäs – Naantali route as Eckerö Link in the autumn of 2026, replacing the older vessel Fjärdvägen. Although operating on the Finnish-Åland route, the ship will retain her Swedish flag and Grisslehamn port of registry to maintain operational subsidies.

== Collision ==
On 16 February 2004, Stena Nautica had a mid channel collision with the freight ship, Joanna, in heavy fog. The Stena Nautica was holed just above the engine room and took on a significant amount of water. Fortunately, sea conditions were calm, which meant the event could have been much worse. All passengers were evacuated to Stena Germanica. The Nautica was eventually towed to Varberg, and later to Gothenburg and Gdańsk for repairs. She reentered service four months later.

== Fire ==
On 24 January 2013 the Swedish Baltic Sea ferry has broken out in the early morning as the fire rescue headquarters in Gothenburg. On board was at the time of the fire, 77 passengers and 40 crew members. The truck erupted in a fire on the car deck and it was fast under control. The fire was not able to spread. The ferry was in the Kattegat on the way from Danish Grenå to Varberg in Sweden.
