= MS Wawel =

Ferry built in 1980

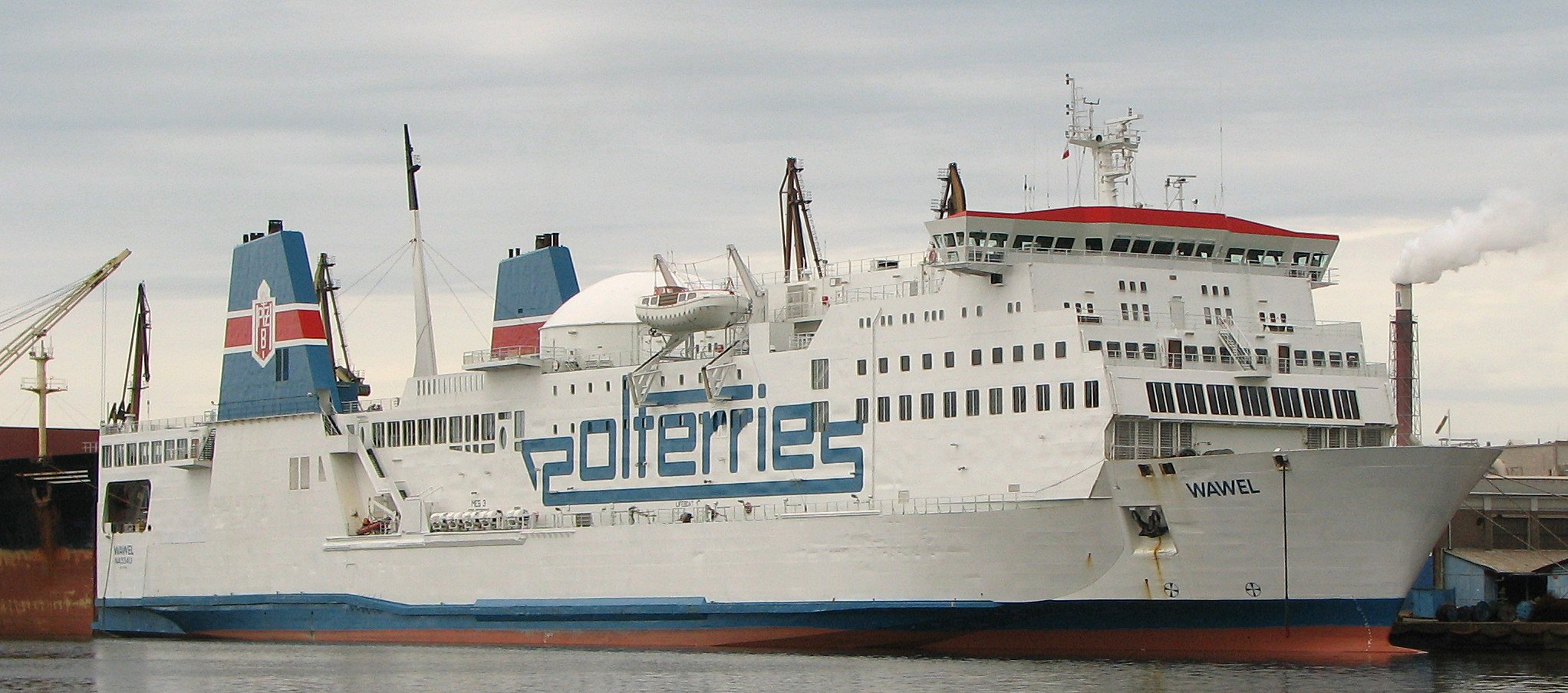
- As Wawel in Gdańsk, Poland in May 2007

History
- Name: Wawel (2004–present); Alkmini A (2003–2004); PO Canterbury (2002–2003); P&OSL Canterbury (1999–2002); Stena Fantasia (1991–1999); Fantasia (1990–1991); Fiesta (1988–1990); Tzarevetz (1982–1988); Scandinavia (1980–1982)
- Operator: POLSCA Baltic Ferries
- Port of registry: Nassau, Bahamas
- Route: Gdańsk - Nynashamn
- Builder: Kockums Varv AB, Sweden
- Yard number: 569
- Launched: 1 December 1979
- Identification: IMO number: 7814462; MMSI Number: 311852000; Call sign: C6TY9

General characteristics (as built)
- Tonnage: 8,919 GRT
- Length: 163.51 m
- Beam: 23.04 m
- Draught: 7.9 m
- Propulsion: 2 x Sulzer 7RLA56
- Speed: 19 knots (35 km/h; 22 mph)
- Capacity: 175 passengers, 2100 lane meters

General characteristics (after 1989 rebuilt)
- Tonnage: 25,212 GT
- Beam: 27.63 m
- Capacity: 1800 pax; 1765 lm
- Notes: otherwise as built

General characteristics (after 2005 rebuilt)
- Tonnage: 25,318 GT
- Length: 163.96 m
- Beam: 27.63 m
- Draught: 6.52 m
- Capacity: 1000 pax; 511 berths; 1490 lane meters
- Notes: otherwise as built

MS Wawel is a ferry launched in 1979 as the Scandinavia. She spent a large part of her career serving the Dover-Calais cross channel ferry route with successive operators. She is currently in service on the Gdańsk - Nynashamn line with POLSCA Baltic Ferries as Wawel.

== Early years ==
Stena Fantasia

Wawel started life as Scandinavia, ordered by and for Rederi AB Nordö, Malmö for services in the Eastern Mediterranean. She was launched at the Kockums Varv AB shipyard in Malmö, Sweden on 1 December 1979 and delivered to Rederi AB Nordö on 17 March 1980, opening a service between Koper, Yugoslavia and Tartous, Syria in April 1980. On 7 June 1980, Scandinavia's sister ship, MS Zenobia capsized on her maiden voyage roughly two kilometres (1.2 mi) away from Larnaca, Cyprus. This precipitated the end of Rederi's Yugoslavia to Syria service. In April 1982 the two remaining vessels Scandinavia and her sister Ariadne were sold to Bulgarian So Mejdunaroden Automobile Transport (SOMAT) and Scandinavia was renamed Tzarevetz. Under SOMAT ownership, Tzarevetz was operated using the MedLink brand running trans-Mediterranean services until 1984 when she was chartered back to Rederi AB to run a service between Greece and Italy. A further charter in 1987 saw her transfer first to the Baltic Sea, and then later in 1988 a brief charter running a service in the North Sea for DFDS. In November 1988, both Tzarvetz and her sister, which had been renamed Trapezitza were sold to Sealink British Ferries.

== Sealink to Stena ==
Following the purchase by Sealink British Ferries she was renamed Fiesta and undertook some charter work in Africa. After only a few trips, Fiesta's crew resigned due to worries over piracy near Lagos, Nigeria and she was consequently laid up in the Fal. Sealink eventually decided to use the two vessels, in a pooling agreement with SNCF to provide a joint service running between Dover and Calais. As a result of this decision, Fiesta and her sister, now named Fantasia were sent to Lloyd Werft, Bremerhaven in June 1989 to be converted from freight carriers to passenger carriers. As part of the pooling agreement, Fantasia was to be given to SNCF, as a result of this, whilst at Bremerhaven, the two vessels swapped names. Fantasia returned to Dover on 8 March 1990, her owners had in the meantime been acquired by Stena Line. The joint services were initially renamed Sealink Stena Line, under the new branding, in October 1990 it was announced that Fantasia would become Stena Fantasia.

In December 1990 she was sent to A&P Appledore for a major overhaul following maneuverability issues and bow visor problems at Calais on 2 December, returning just after Christmas with her new name. Ongoing maneuverability issues resulted in a starboard hole following her spending eight hours pinned against the mooring quay in Dover during bad weather on 8 January 1991. She was sent to Rotterdam for repairs and at the same time her stern was adjusted to make it compatible with the docks at Calais. The maneuverability issues were not finally fixed until a further refit in Gothenburg beginning 6 November 1991 returning to Dover-Calais service in December 1991.

In 1993, Stena Fantasia became the first cross-channel ferry to carry a McDonald's restaurant, having been installed during a refit at Bremerhaven that year. In July 1995 SNCF announced their intention to withdraw from the pooling agreement which had been set up in 1989 to operate a new service under the name of SeaFrance from 1996. As a result of this, Stena Sealink Line dropped the 'Sealink' to become Stena Line as of 31 December 1995. Stena Fantasia continued service with Stena Line and transferred on 10 March 1998 to the newly formed joint venture of P&O Stena Line with the merger of P&O European Ferries' and Stena Line's eastern channel operations. As a result of this change, and the new companies attempt to merge the two fleets, the P&O Stena 'Brand World' was rolled out across the fleet, this included the renaming of all vessels in the new fleet, Stena Fantasia consequently became P&OSL Canterbury during her December 1998 refit.

Under P&O Stena Line P&OSL Canterbury continued the Dover-Calais route, on 11 August 1999 she was hired out on charter to the Daily Mail to enable passengers to view the European Solar Eclipse. This era was not without fault, with further bow door problems in April 2000 and flooding of a machine room in May 2001 causing her to be taken out of service for repairs both times. In October 2002, P&O bought Stena Line's 40% share in P&O Stena Line and the vessel was speedily renamed PO Canterbury, then returning after her winter refit as the Pride of Canterbury for a short service in Spring 2003. In mid-May 2003, Pride of Canterbury was laid up in Dunkirk awaiting disposal, thus ending her 13-year career on the Dover-Calais route. She was sold to GA Ferries of Greece in October 2003 but did not depart until March 2004.

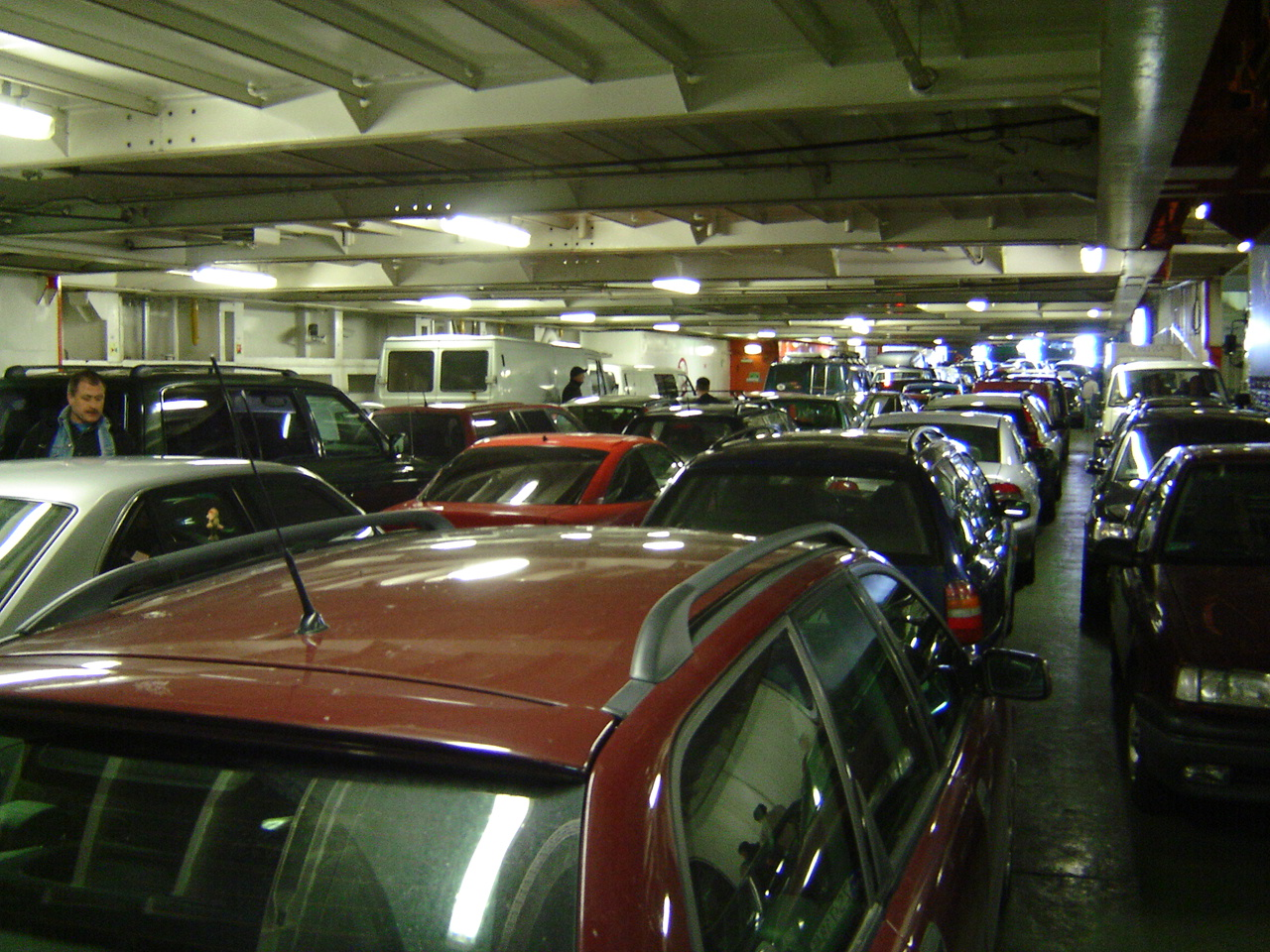
The car deck in 2006

== Post P&O ==
In March 2004, the new owners GA Ferries renamed the vessel Alkmini A, operating a service between Igoumenitsa, Greece and Brindisi, Italy from June 2004. In September 2004 Alkmini A was sold to Polferries and transferred to the Baltic Sea as Wawel operating a route from 15 February 2005 between Swinoujscie, Poland and Ystad, Sweden. In October 2008 she was chartered to DFDS to continue this route, both DFDS and Polferries now operate this route in collaboration. In 2015 she transferred to the Gdańsk - Nynäshamn route. The vessel, as of 2022, is still in service with Polferries, alongside Nova Star, a much newer vessel built in 2011 (in service with Polferries since 2018). As of 2026, the vessel is in service with POLSCA Baltic Ferries on the Gdańsk - Nynashamn line.

== Sister ships ==
Wawel had two sister ships:

- SeaFrance Cézanne - scrapped in Alang, India, October 2011.
- Zenobia - capsized on maiden voyage in June 1980.
