= P&O European Ferries =

Ferry company, 1987–1999

- Genre: Ferry company
- Predecessor: Townsend Thoresen
- Founded: 1987
- Defunct: 1999
- Successor: P&O Portsmouth, P&O Stena Line, P&O Irish Sea
- Area served: English Channel North Channel
- Services: Passenger transportation, freight transportation

P&O European Ferries was a ferry company which operated in the English Channel from 1987 after the Herald of Free Enterprise disaster, when Townsend Thoresen was renamed P&O European Ferries, until 1999 when the Portsmouth operations became P&O Portsmouth and the Dover operations were merged with Stena Line to form P&O Stena Line.

== History ==
P&O European Ferries was formed after the Townsend Thoresen ship, Herald of Free Enterprise, capsized outside Zeebrugge in 1987. P&O owned the whole of European Group who marketed their ferry services as Townsend Thoresen. After the bad publicity that the Zeebrugge disaster brought to the brand P&O quickly rebranded Townsend Thoresen as P&O European Ferries with all of the former Townsend Thoresen fleet, all of the vessels received the Blue P&O hull and blue funnel.

In 1993 P&O launched a new Portsmouth to Bilbao route using the former Olympia and renamed her the Pride of Bilbao. In 1994 when Olau Line ceased operations the 2 German built superferries Olau Britannia and Olau Hollandia were chartered to P&O and they were both renamed the Pride of Portsmouth and the Pride of Le Havre respectively. The new Pride of Le Havre replaced the first ship of that name which was renamed Pride of Cherbourg and replaced the original Pride of Cherbourg on the Portsmouth - Cherbourg route.

In 1998 P&O European Ferries Dover operations and Stena Line's Dover and Newhaven operations merged and became P&O Stena Line with P&O European Ferries putting forward their Dover - Calais and Dover - Zeebrugge route vessels forward and P&O Irish Sea was formed in 1998, following the merger of the Cairnryan-based service of P&O European Ferries (Felixstowe) Limited and Pandoro (who operated routes between England, Scotland and France to Ireland), while the Portsmouth operations remained unchanged until 1999 when it became P&O Portsmouth.

== Past fleet ==
Ship	Service	Route(s)
Pride of Ailsa	1992-1996	Cairnryan-Larne
Pride of Bilbao	1993–1999	Portsmouth-Bilbao
Pride of Cherbourg (1)	1989–1994	Portsmouth-Le Havre/Cherbourg
Pride of Cherbourg (2)	1994–1999	Portsmouth-Cherbourg
Pride of Cherbourg II	1994	Portsmouth-Cherbourg
Pride of Hampshire	1989-1999	Portsmouth-Le Havre/Cherbourg
Pride of Le Havre (1)	1989–1994	Portsmouth-Le Havre/Cherbourg
Pride of Le Havre (2)	1994–1999	Portsmouth-Le Havre
Pride of Portsmouth	1994–1999	Portsmouth-Le Havre
Pride of Rathlin	1992-1998	Cairnryan-Larne
Pride of Sandwich	1988-1992	Dover-Calais/Zeebrugge
Pride of Walmer	1988-1992	Dover-Calais/Zeebrugge
Pride of Winchester	1989–1995	Portsmouth-Le Havre/Cherbourg
Superstar Express	1998–1999	Portsmouth-Cherbourg
Jetliner	1996-1998	Cairnryan-Larne
Pride of Bruges	1988-1998	Dover-Calais/Zeebrugge
Pride of Dover	1987–1998	Dover-Calais
Pride of Calais	1987–1998	Dover-Calais
Pride of Kent	1987–1998	Dover-Calais/Zeebrugge
European Highway	1992–1998	Dover-Zeebrugge
European Pathway	1992–1998	Dover-Zeebrugge
European Seaway	1993–1998	Dover-Zeebrugge
Pride of Burgundy	1993–1998	Dover-Calais
Ionic Ferry	1987-1992	Cairnryan-Larne
European Endeavour	1987 - 1998	Dover - Calais/Zeebrugge Larne-Cairnryan / Felixstowe-Zeebrugge
Europic Ferry	1987-1993	Cairnryan-Larne

== Routes ==
- Dover - Calais
- Dover - Zeebrugge
- Portsmouth - Le Havre
- Portsmouth - Cherbourg
- Portsmouth - Bilbao
- Cairnryan - Larne
- Felixstowe - Rotterdam (Europort)
- Felixstowe - Zeebrugge
