= T&T Express =

Ferry built in 1997

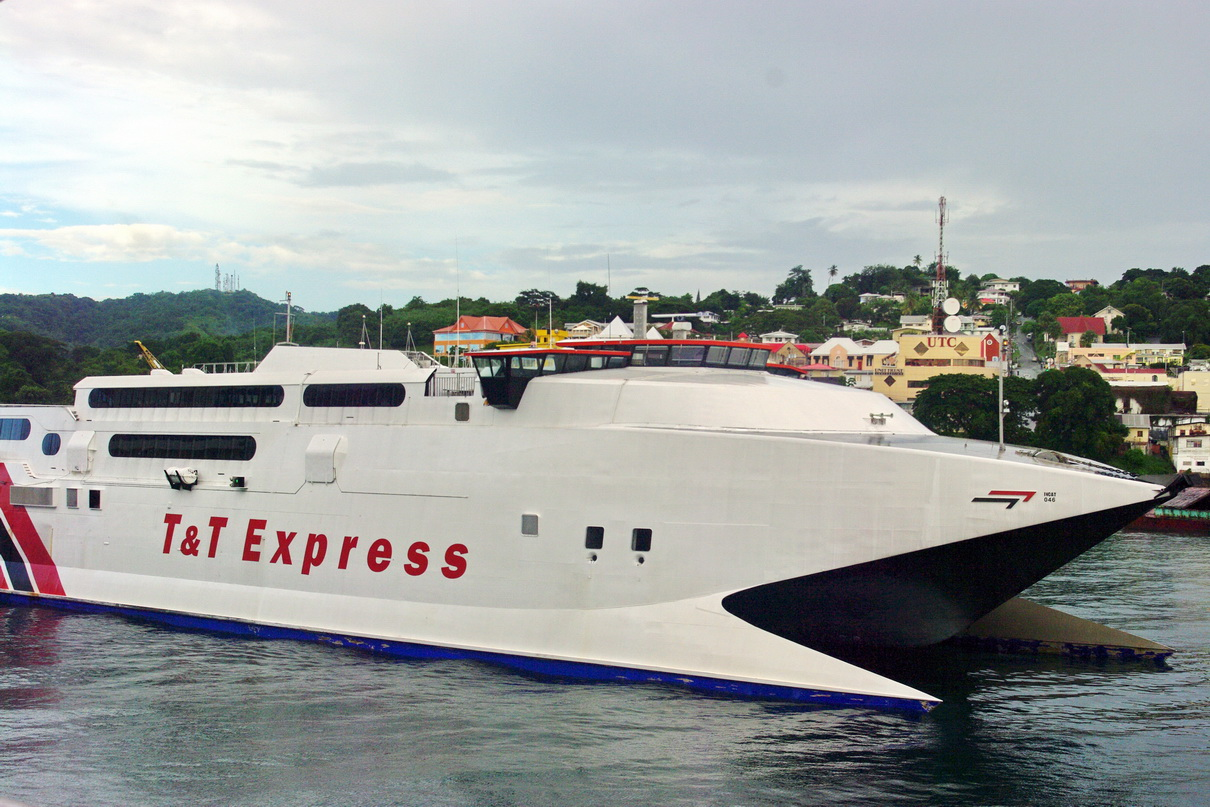

History

Spain
- Name: T&T Express
- Operator: 1997-1998, 2000-2001, 2001-2002: Spirit of Tasmania; 1998-2002: Bay Ferries; 2002-2003: Interislander; 2003-2021: Bay Ferries; 2021: Transmapi
- Route: Port of Spain - Scarborough
- Builder: Incat, Australia
- Yard number: 046
- Laid down: 17 February 1997
- Launched: 20 September 1997
- Commissioned: December 1997
- Out of service: 24 April 2021
- Home port: Port of Spain, Trinidad and Tobago
- Identification: IMO number: 9172076; MMSI number: 362024000; Call sign: 9YGM
- Fate: Sank
- Notes: Classification: DnV +1A1 HSLC R1 Car Ferry

General characteristics
- Type: High-speed craft
- Tonnage: 5,617 GT
- Length: 91.3 m (299 ft 6 in)
- Beam: 26 m (85 ft 4 in)
- Draught: 3.7 m (12 ft 2 in)
- Ramps: Stern Ro-Ro loading
- Propulsion: 4 × Ruston 20 RK 270 medium-speed diesel engines, 38,000 bhp (28,337 kW)
- Speed: 43 knots (80 km/h; 49 mph)
- Boats & landing craft carried: 10 × 100-person life rafts, 4 escape slides
- Capacity: 762 passengers; 240 vehicles
- Crew: 22

T&T Express was a wave-piercing catamaran passenger-vehicle ferry. It operated under various marketing names, including Devil Cat, The Cat, The Lynx, and lastly T&T Express.

== Vessel characteristics ==
T&T Express was a 91-metre (299 ft) vessel built by Incat in Hobart, Australia, in 1997 as hull 046. She was a sister ship to Superexpress (holder of a Trans-Atlantic speed record), Eurochampion Jet and Caldera Vista, all of which are Incat91 models.

It was constructed from marine-grade aluminium alloys. Each water-borne hull was subdivided into multiple watertight compartments connected by an arched bridging structure with a central forward hull above the smooth water line. Each water-borne hull carried two engines which drove water jets mounted on the transom.

Vehicles were stowed in and between both waterborne hulls in a configuration of rising and descending decks which loaded from a single-level transfer bridge at the stern. The main passenger deck was immediately above the vehicle decks and consisted of a cafe, gift shop, children's play area and passenger seating lounges, as well as an outside observation deck that ran the width of the ship at the stern. The passenger seating lounges had overhead television monitors which played movies or television broadcasts, as well as a continuously updated map showing the vessel's GPS coordinates. A smaller secondary passenger deck was located one deck up and has a bar immediately aft of the wheelhouse.

== Service history ==
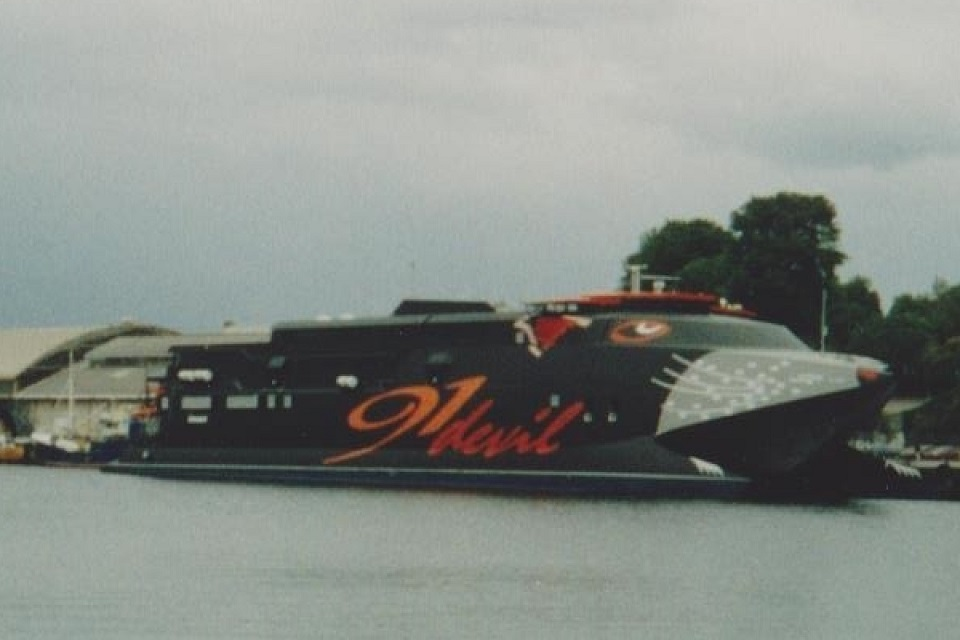
Devil Cat

=== Spirit of Tasmania (1997–1998, 2000–2001, 2001–2002) ===
The vessel was constructed for Spirit of Tasmania and operated across Bass Strait on the world's longest-distance high-speed ferry service (marketed as Devil Cat), between Station Pier, Port Melbourne to The Esplanade, George Town, Tasmania. Typical service speed was 80 km/h (50 mph) with fares averaging $100 (AUD) one-way in peak season (Dec–Jan) and $92 one-way in shoulder season (Jan–Apr). Weather conditions in the Bass Strait often led to cancellation during storms and heavy seas, with five cancellations in the first ten weeks of operating. The vessel's ride during choppy conditions led to its nickname "Spew Cat". The ship was sold to Bay Ferries after the first season, but during the 2000–2001, 2001–2002 summer peak periods it was charted to again run the George Town to Station Pier route as the Devil Cat.

=== Bay Ferries (1998–2002) ===
It was sold to Bay Ferries in 1998 for service on that company's Gulf of Maine route between Yarmouth, Nova Scotia, and Bar Harbor, Maine, under the marketing name The Cat. The vessel departed Hobart on April 26, 1998, arriving in Yarmouth on May 20, 1998, to great fanfare from the American and Canadian news media.

On September 4, 1998, the vessel collided with a fishing boat in Yarmouth Harbour in thick fog. The vessel was heading out of the harbour when it collided with the Lady Megan II, which was entering the harbour after a two-day fishing trip on Georges Bank. The vessel crushed the smaller fishing boat, killing the captain, but the three crew members survived.

The vessel operated seasonally on the Yarmouth–Bar Harbor route from May–October. In early 2002, the vessel was sold to Incat by Bay Ferries, as a trade-in for the newer and larger-capacity The Cat, which, in the case of this vessel, is its official registered name.

=== Interislander (2002–2003) ===
The vessel was leased by Incat to the Interislander, New Zealand operating on the Cook Strait that year, using the marketing name The Lynx; however, operating issues relating to its wake ended the fast ferry era on the Wellington - Picton route. At the end of the summer season, it was relocated to Newcastle where it was dry-docked and handed over to Bay Ferries for the Trinidad - Tobago run. The relocation went via Tahiti and the Panama Canal.

=== Bay Ferries (2003–2006) ===
Bay Ferries subsequently repurchased the vessel and leased it under a wet charter (crewed and operated by Bay Ferries) for a route in Trinidad and Tobago between Port of Spain and Scarborough. Bay Ferries maintained the Interisland Line's marketing graphics on the vessel and referred to it as The Lynx during this period.

=== Government of Trinidad and Tobago (2006–2021) ===
The vessel was purchased from Bay Ferries by the Government of Trinidad and Tobago's Ministry of Works and Transport in 2006. She maintained the official registered name of Incat 046 but was marketed as the T&T Express and operated by Bay Ferries Management Ltd. on behalf of the government. She operated the interisland service between Port of Spain and Scarborough in conjunction with the HSC T&T Spirit.

=== Trasmapi (2021) ===
The vessel sank 800 miles (1,300 km) off the Azores Islands on its journey to Spain after being sold to Trasmapi.

== Sister ships ==
- Superexpress
- Eurochampion Jet
- Eurochampion Jet 2
