= MS Stena Nordica (2000) =

Stena Line ship

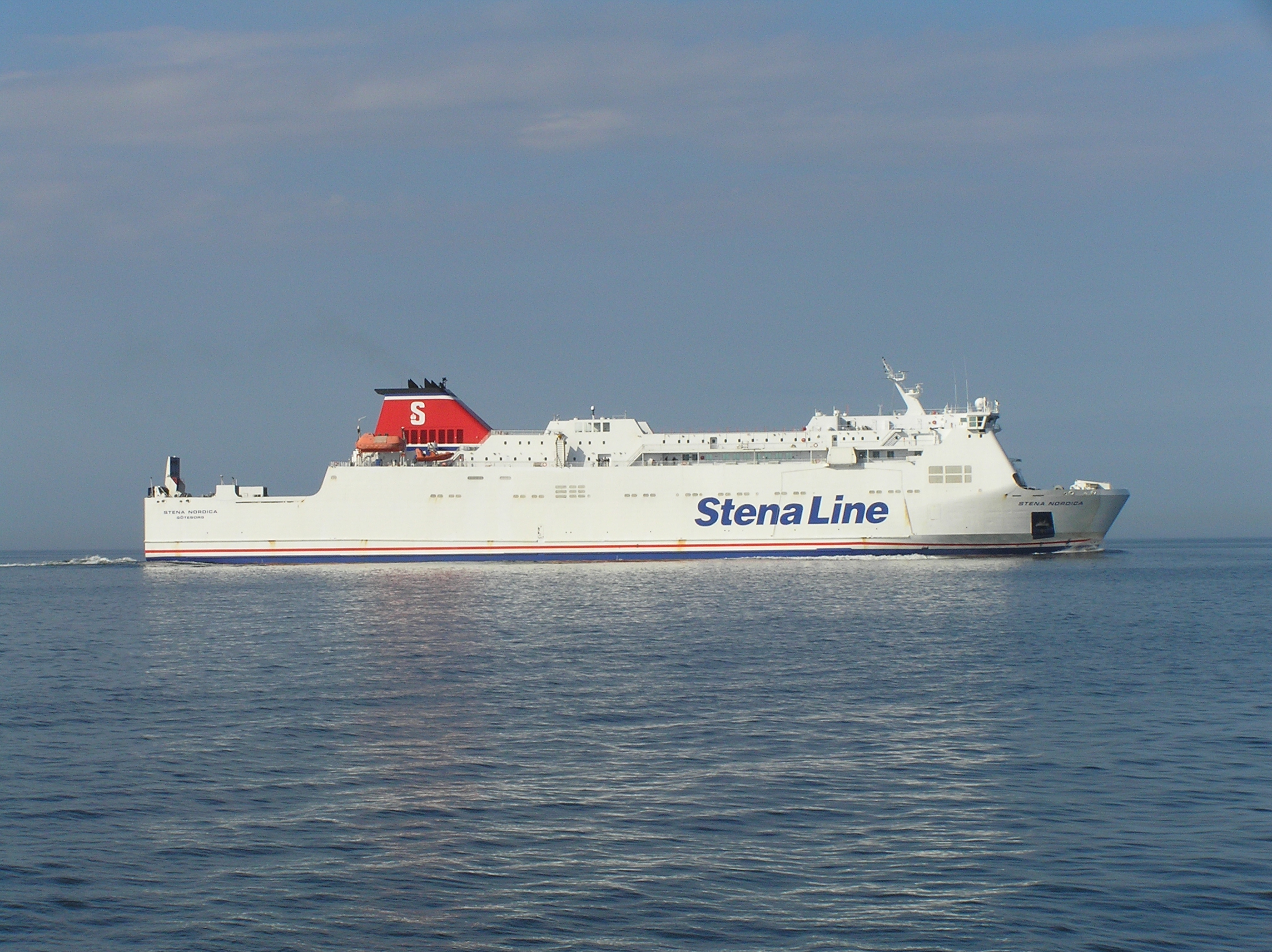

History
- Name: 2000-2004: European Ambassador; 2004-2015: Stena Nordica; 2015-2016: Malo Seaways; 2016 - onwards: Stena Nordica
- Operator: 2000-2004: P&O Irish Sea; 2004-2015: Stena Line; 2015-2016: DFDS Seaways; 2016: GNV; 2017 onwards: Stena Line
- Port of registry: Limassol, Cyprus
- Route: Fishguard-Rosslare
- Builder: Mitsubishi Heavy Industries, Japan
- Yard number: 1068
- Launched: 18 August 2000
- In service: 2000
- Identification: IMO number: 9215505; Call sign SCBK
- Status: In service

General characteristics
- Tonnage: 24,206 GT; 4,768 t DWT
- Length: 170 m (557 ft 9 in)
- Beam: 26.0 m (85 ft 4 in)
- Draught: 6.0 m (19 ft 8 in)
- Installed power: 2 × Wärtsilä 18V38; 2 × Wärtsilä 12V38
- Propulsion: Twin screw propulsion
- Speed: 25.7 knots
- Capacity: 699 passengers; 222 berths; 375 cars; 1,949 lane metres

Stena Nordica, formerly the European Ambassador, is a roll-on/roll-off ferry owned and operated by Stena Line.

== History ==
Stena Nordica was built as the European Ambassador for P&O Irish Sea. She initially entered service between Liverpool and Dublin. Soon after she was used on the new Mostyn to Dublin service. She opened a direct Dublin to Cherbourg route making one round trip at the weekend, with a call to Rosslare outbound in the winter. In 2004, she was transferred to Stena Line with P&O's Fleetwood – Larne and Dublin – Mostyn vessels. The Dublin - Mostyn and Dublin - Cherbourg routes were closed following the Stena Line takeover.

Following the closure of the Mostyn service, she was sold to Stena Line in 2004. The European Ambassador sailed for Scandinavia and was renamed the Stena Nordica. She entered service between Karlskrona - Gdynia where she increased her capacity significantly. After a major refit including the fitting of new ramps to speed up loading and unloading, the ship entered service under the Swedish flag in May 2004. She returned to Dublin as a relief ship in January 2008, when she arrived from Fishguard and Rosslare, where she had conducted berthing trials. After trials in Dublin, she then sailed to Holyhead to take up the roster covering the Stena Seatrader's refit. She then covered the Stena Europe's refit and returned to the Baltic in February.

In October 2008 it was announced that the Stena Nordica would be returning to the Irish Sea replacing the Stena Seatrader and increasing capacity between Dublin and Holyhead. In March 2009 the Stena Nordica received a £2 million refit which improved passenger areas and brought the vessel into line with the rest of the Irish sea fleet.

In 2014 Stena Line took possession of Dieppe Seaways at the end of its charter to DFDS Seaways, who used the ship on the Dover - Calais route. In January 2015, it was announced that DFDS Seaways had chartered Stena Nordica to be the replacement running mate on their Calais route, effectively performing a ship swap.

In summer 2016, she was briefly chartered to Grandi Navi Veloci (GNV) to sail on Genoa services, one of which was from Genoa to Termini Imerese. She was returned to Stena by the end of the year. From her return from the GNV charter, she continues to be used by Stena as a cover vessel, and hence she never really had a consistent service on one route, frequently switching routes generally every few months for refit cover or any other reason.

However in February 2023, Stena announced that the vessel would replace the Stena Europe on the Fishguard Harbour - Rosslare route. Prior to entering service on the route, the vessel underwent a refit in Poland, which added new Stena Plus and Hygge lounges on deck 6. She then covered the Stena Superfast VII and Stena Superfast VIII refits on the Belfast - Cairnryan route.

In January 2026 Stena Nordica was moved to cover the Holyhead - Dublin route as the Stena Estrid underwent repairs after hull damage sustained calling at Holyhead on 7 January 2026, her own Fishguard - Rosslare route being covered by Ben-my-Chree, which was chartered to Stena Line for four months. Stena Nordica will substitute other Stena Line routes for the remainder of the charter period.

Stena Nordica is a close relative to the P&O Irish Sea twins European Causeway and European Highlander, which operate between Cairnryan and Larne.
