= MS Anna Marine =

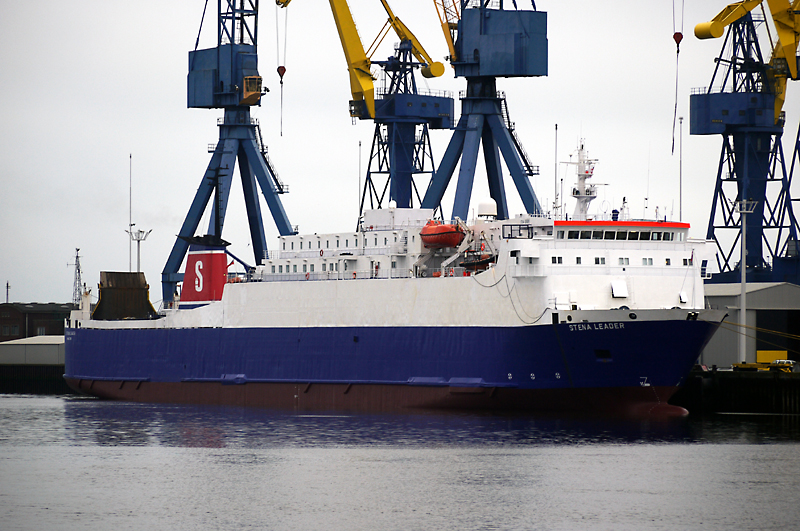
- Stena Leader at Belfast

History
- Name: Anna Marine; Stena Leader (2004–2011); European Leader (1998–2004); Buffalo (1975–1998)
- Owner: 2011 onwards ANRUSSTRANS; Stena Line (2004–2011); P&O Irish Sea (1975–2004)
- Port of registry: 2011 - Giurgiulești, Moldova; Hamilton, Bermuda
- Route: Fleetwood - Larne
- Builder: J.J. Sietas KG, Schiffswerf GmbH, Hamburg, Germany
- Yard number: 756
- Launched: 6 January 1975
- Identification: IMO number: 7361582
- Fate: Scrapped Aliaga 2014

General characteristics
- Tonnage: 12,879 GT
- Length: 155 m
- Beam: 19.05 m
- Draught: 5.77 m
- Propulsion: 2 x Deutz RBV12M540
- Speed: 18.5 kn

MS Anna Marine was a ro-ro ferry that operated on the Stena Line service from Larne, Northern Ireland to Fleetwood, England.

The ship was built in 1975 for Pandoro Ltd and was named Buffalo. In 1998 the ship was renamed European Leader in preparation for rebranding of Pandoro Ltd to P&O Irish Sea the same year. In 2004 Stena Line bought the route and the ship was renamed Stena Leader.

Stena closed the Larne to Fleetwood route in December 2010 and the vessel was sold to Anrustrans in June 2011 who renamed her Anna Marine. In February 2014 she was scrapped in Aliaga Turkey.

== Sister ships ==
The Stena Leader was one of three vessels based on the same design. The other two vessels were the Stena Pioneer and the Stena Seafarer.
