= Virgin Atlantic Challenge Trophy =

Shipping award

The Virgin Atlantic Challenge Trophy is an award for the fastest trans-Atlantic crossing by a surface vessel, one of several such awards that have grown out of the contest for the prestigious Blue Riband of the Atlantic. The trophy was created following Richard Branson's record-breaking Atlantic crossing in 1986 and the refusal by the American Merchant Marine Museum to surrender the Hales Trophy, the then only official award for the Atlantic crossing record. The Virgin Atlantic Challenge Trophy is currently held by the Aga Khan's vessel, Destriero.

== Background ==
The Blue Riband of the Atlantic was a contest between Atlantic passenger shipping companies and their express liners to achieve the fastest average speed on a commercial crossing. The contest was unofficial, involving no set rules or tangible award, and was undertaken for the prestige the accolade brought. In 1935 British businessman Harold Hales created the Hales Trophy. It passed to the owners of several express liners, though not to Cunard, owner of the record-breaking Queen Mary, and was won in 1952 by the American Lines liner United States. Thereafter the competition lapsed due to the rapid rise of transatlantic air travel, and United States herself was laid up in 1969.

In 1985 British entrepreneur Richard Branson's attempt to break the United States's record and win the Blue Riband led to the building of Virgin Atlantic Challenger, which failed in a crossing in July of that year. In 1986, a second attempt by Branson, in Virgin Atlantic Challenger II, set a new speed record, but the American Merchant Marine Museum refused to surrender the Hales Trophy, claiming Challenger was not a commercial passenger ship. Undaunted, Branson had a new trophy made, making it a challenge trophy open to any who could beat Virgin Atlantic Challenger's record.

== The trophy ==
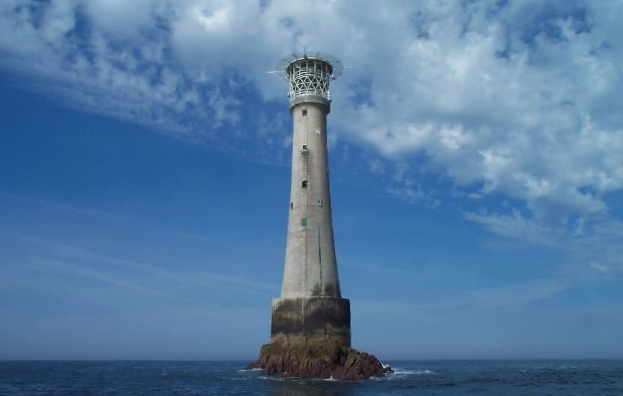
Bishop Rock lighthouse

The Virgin Atlantic Challenge Trophy is a three-foot silver sculpture, modelled on the Bishop Rock Lighthouse, chosen as the finishing line for many of the Blue Riband crossings, and of the successful 1986 voyage. The model depicts the lighthouse and the rock itself.

== History ==
Branson's first attempt on the record, in 65 ft twin-hull Virgin Atlantic Challenger, departed New York in June 1985. After surviving rough weather and the threat of late icebergs Challenger was fatally damaged by striking a submerged object 100 miles from Bishops Rock, the intended finishing line, and sank in heavy seas. All the crew were saved. The following year, in a new craft, the 72 ft monohull Virgin Atlantic Challenger II, Branson completed the crossing in three days, eight hours and 31 minutes, averaging just under 36 knots; he thus shaved two hours and nine minutes off the time set by United States in 1952. Branson had unfurled a six-foot blue pennant to mark the achievement, and announced “we are throwing down the gauntlet for anyone else to make a transatlantic challenge and beat it”, but the AMMM later derided his achievement, referring to Challenger as “a little toy boat”. In response to this Branson decided to commission the new trophy, open to all challengers.

In 1988 a new challenge was planned by Paolo Vitelli, in a 100 ft monohull, Azimut Atlantic Challenger, but this attempt came to nothing.

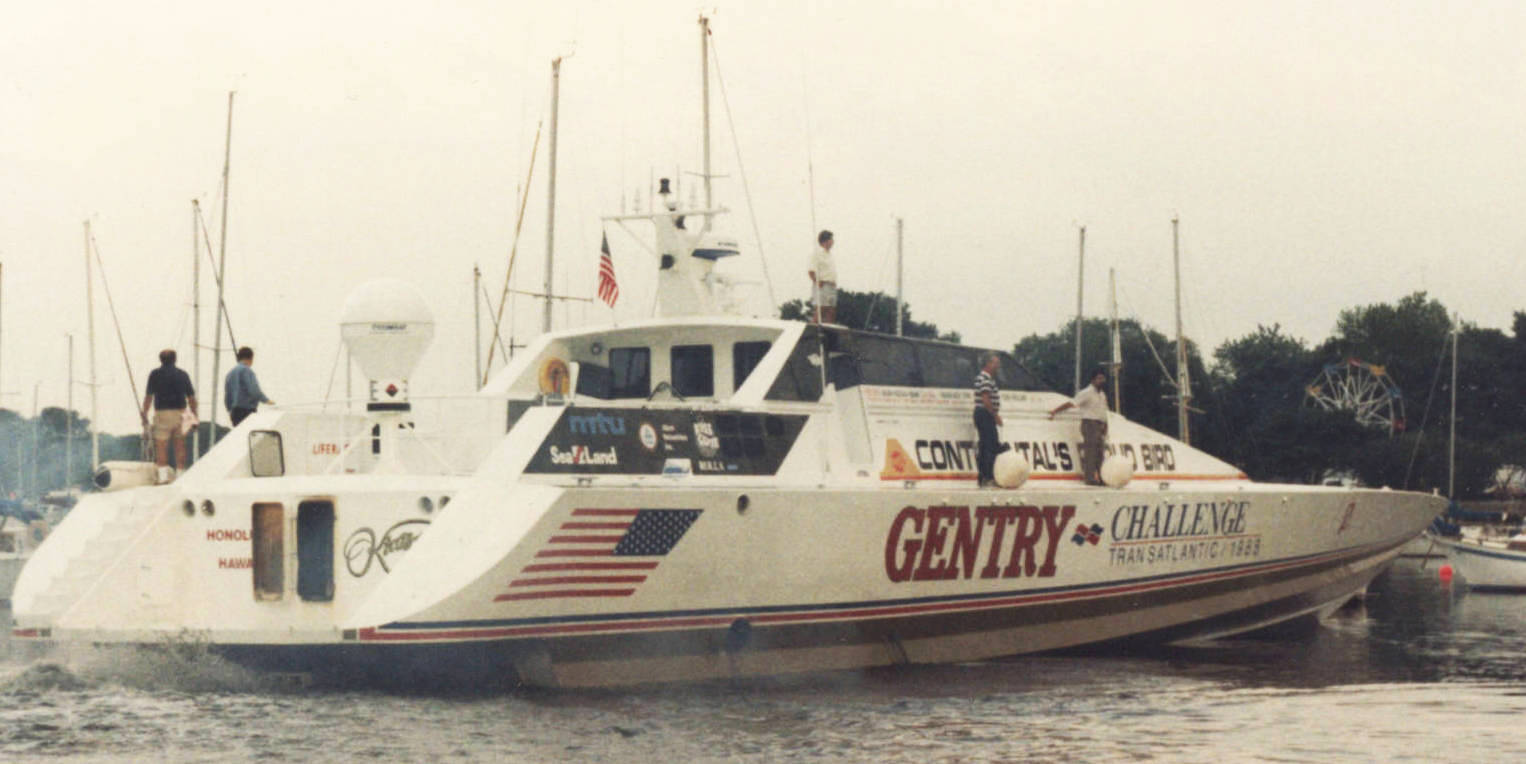
Tom Gentry's Gentry Eagle at Mamaroneck, New York, prior to her 1988 record attempt

That same year American businessman Tom Gentry made an attempt in his 110 ft powerboat Gentry Eagle, (which cost $7 million in 1988 ($16 million in 2024 dollars) and was fitted with twin 3,480 hp MTU V396 TB94s turbocharged marine diesel engines, in addition to a single 4,500-horsepower Textron Lycoming TF40 marine turbine engine for a total of 11,500 horsepower) but she was damaged by heavy seas off Newfoundland and forced to turn back. Gentry's aim was to “bring blue riband home”, which he achieved the following year. His second attempt in July 1989 saw Gentry Eagle cross the line in 62 hours 7 minutes, at an average speed of 47.4 knots (54.5 mph), exceeding Branson's record by almost a quarter. Gentry was met at St. Mary's, Isles of Scilly, by Branson and warmly congratulated; he subsequently received the trophy to mark his achievement.

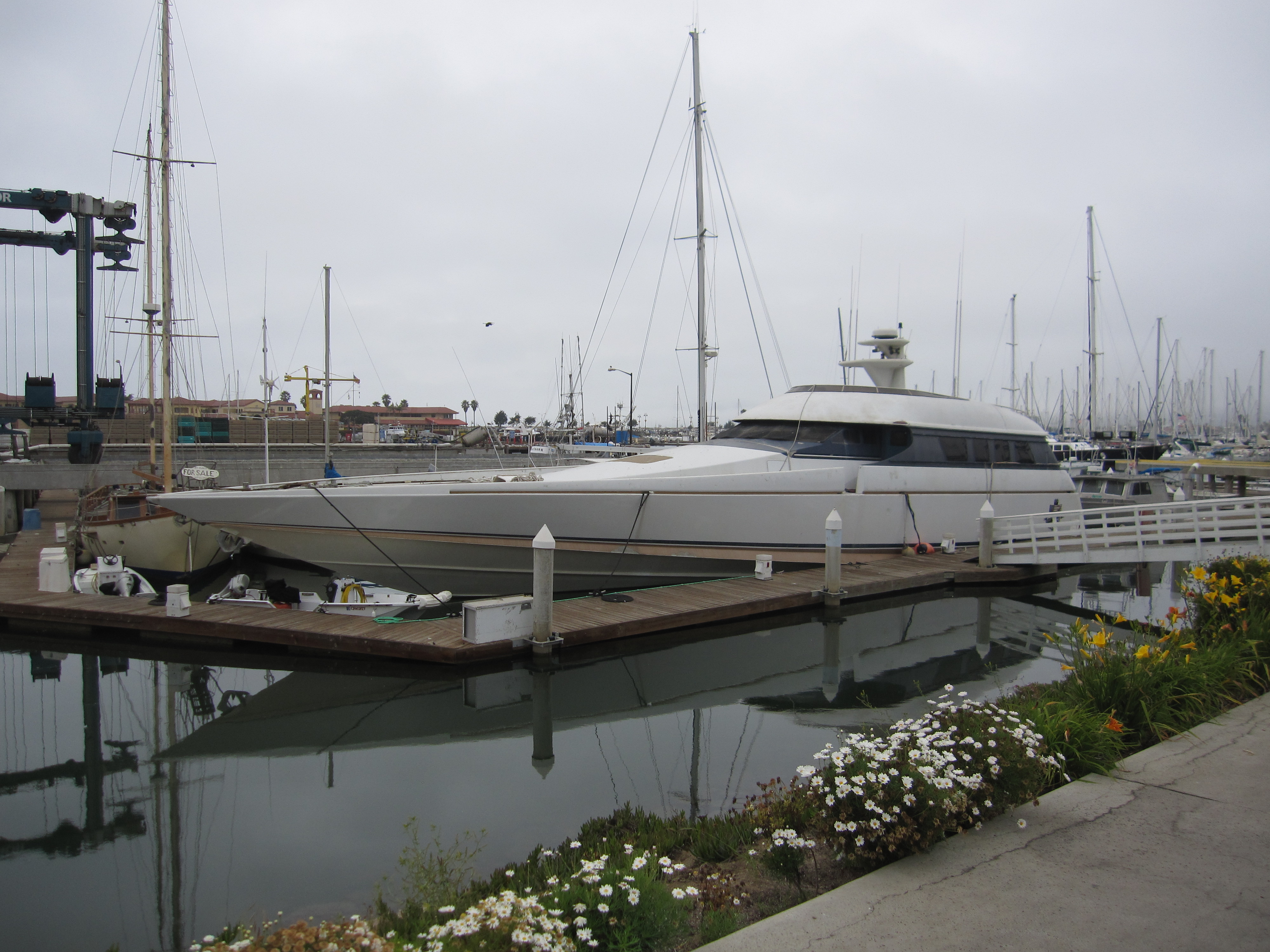
Gentry Eagle, Ventura Harbor, 2013

In 1991 it was reported that three challengers were under construction; a new boat, Eagle II from Gentry, North East Spirit from Richard Noble, the land speed record holder, and Destriero, from the Aga Khan. In the event, only Destriero made the crossing, setting a new record with an average speed of 53 knots (the time was not comparable, as the route taken, from Tarifa, Spain to New York, was longer).

Despite rumours of new challengers with radical hull designs Destriero' record remains unbroken.

== See also ==
- Columbus Atlantic Trophy
