= Power Jet =

Greek High speed catamaran

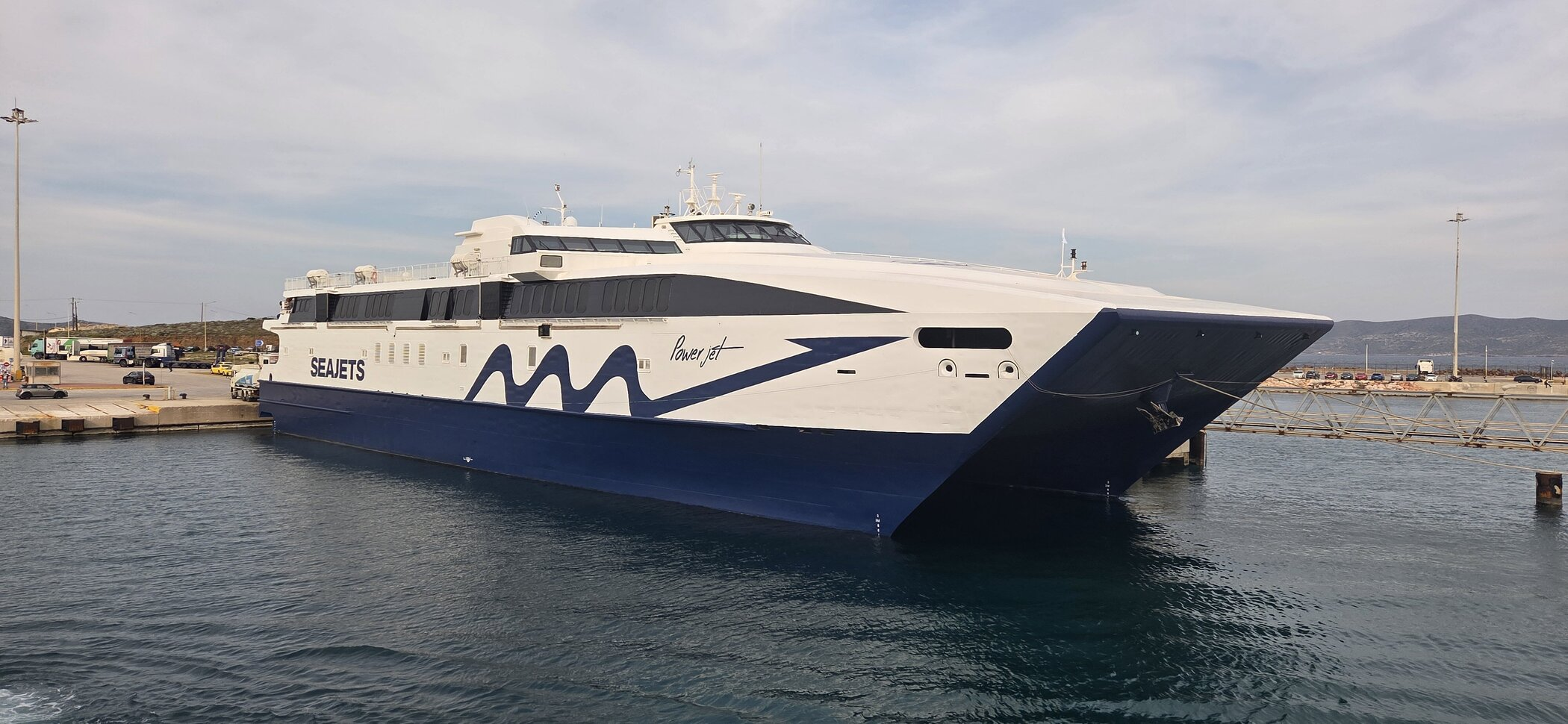
- Power Jet in Lavrion

History
- Name: 1996–2002: Delphin; 2002–2005: TT-Delphin; 2005–2017: Almottahedah 1; 2017–2018: Blue Power; 2018–present: Power Jet
- Owner: 1996–2005: TT-Line; 2005: International Fast Ferries; 2005–2017: United Company for Marine Lines; 2017–present: Seajets
- Operator: 1996–2005: TT-Line; 2006–2012: United Company for Marine Lines; 2020–present: Seajets
- Port of registry: 1996–2002: Nassau, Bahamas; 2002–2005: Trelleborg, Sweden; 2005–2017: Jeddah, Saudi Arabia; 2017–2018: Lomé, Togo; 2018–present: Limassol, Cyprus
- Route: Piraeus – Milos – Santorini – Rethymno; Former: Heraklion – Santorini – Naxos – Paros – Mykonos; Former: Hurghada – Duba; Former: Rostock – Trelleborg
- Builder: Austal; Fremantle, Australia
- Yard number: 46
- Laid down: 10 August 1995
- Launched: 10 February 1996
- Completed: 1 April 1996
- Acquired: 2017 (by Seajets)
- Maiden voyage: 13 May 1996
- In service: 1996
- Identification: IMO number: 9127576; Call sign: 5BTC4; MMSI number: 212681000
- Status: in service

General characteristics
- Class & type: Austal Auto Express 82
- Tonnage: 5,335 GT; 391 DWT
- Length: 82.3 m (270 ft 0 in)
- Beam: 23.0 m (75 ft 6 in)
- Draft: 2.5 m (8 ft 2 in)
- Ramps: Stern vehicle loading ramp
- Installed power: 4 × MTU 20V 1163 TB73 main diesel engines (total 24,000 kW)
- Propulsion: 4 × waterjets
- Speed: 37.5 knots (69.5 km/h; 43.2 mph) (service)
- Capacity: 1,200 passengers; 150 vehicles
- Crew: 36

Power Jet is an 82.3-metre high-speed passenger and vehicle catamaran built in 1996 by Austal in Fremantle, Australia. Originally delivered as Delphin (later TT-Delphin) to TT-Line for service between Rostock and Trelleborg, she was later sold to United Company for Marine Lines as Almottahedah 1 to operate in the Red Sea. Acquired by Seajets in 2017, she was renamed Power Jet and operates fast ferry services across the Aegean Sea.

== Service ==
The catamaran, the first of a series of four sister units, was launched on 10 February 1996 at the Austal specialist shipyard in Fremantle with the name Delphin and delivered on 1 April to TT-Line, sailing the same day from Australia to Germany, where she arrived on 10 May. Three days later she entered service on the connections between Rostock and Trelleborg. On 17 January 2002 she was then renamed TT-Delphin.

On 19 December 2004, with the cessation of service, the catamaran was laid up in Trelleborg and subsequently transferred on 11 January 2005 to Rostock and put up for sale. In May it was purchased by International Fast Ferries, to whom it was delivered on 18 May, changing its name to Almottahedah 1 in June. Finally, on 6 July the catamaran left Germany for the Red Sea, where it entered service in February 2006 on the Hurghada -Dubai routes under the flag of United Company for Marine. However, in 2012, the catamaran was laid up along with the rest of the fleet in the Egyptian port due to the company's financial difficulties, remaining there until August 2017, when it was sold to Seajets, from which it was temporarily renamed Blue Power and transferred to the Elefsina shipyards, where it underwent preparatory renovation works in view of its return to service. After the first technical stop, during which it was renamed Power Jet, the catamaran underwent two further stops, one in the Ampelakia shipyards and one in those of Chalkida, both during 2019, finally taking service in 2020 on the connections between Heraklion, Santorini, Naxos, Paros and Mykonos, to which a stopover in Ios was added the following year. In 2025 it was finally transferred to the connections between Piraeus, Milos, Santorini and Rethymno.

== Accidents and Incidents ==
On 15 May 2021, during the midday hours, the Santorini Port Authority was notified by a passenger arriving on the Cyprus-flagged high-speed ferry Power Jet that a strong vibration was felt during the voyage, roughly 15 minutes prior to docking at Athinios port.

The vessel safely disembarked its 129 passengers, 33 cars, and 7 motorcycles. Personnel from the local Ship Inspection Team immediately boarded the ferry and discovered abrasions on the lower surface of the portside hydrofoil (T-foil). The impact to the hydrofoil had transferred structural force through its shaft to the upper watertight hatch, shearing its retaining bolts and causing a controlled ingress of water that partially flooded the portside No. 2 watertight compartment. A professional diver inspected the submerged hull and found no further abrasions or cracks.

The crew used onboard pumps to continuously discharge the water. No injuries or marine pollution were reported. The Santorini Port Authority launched a preliminary investigation and detained the vessel until repairs are completed and a certificate of seaworthiness is issued by its classification society. The shipowner arranged alternative transit for the 74 passengers, 10 cars, 3 motorcycles, and 1 trailer scheduled to depart on the ferry.

== Sister ships ==
- Speed Jet
- Tallink AutoExpress 2
- Avemar Dos
