= Hales Trophy =

Award for the fastest Atlantic Ocean crossing

The Hales Trophy of 1935

The Hales Trophy, officially the North Atlantic Blue Riband Challenge Trophy is an award for the fastest Atlantic crossing by a commercial passenger vessel.

The award was created in 1935 when Harold Hales, a British politician and owner of Hales Brothers shipping company, donated the trophy to be a permanent, tangible expression of the Blue Riband, the unofficial accolade then given for this feat. Hales also wished to formalize the rules regarding the contest, which up to then had no official form, though they were, by tradition, widely recognized. The rules for the Hales Trophy were different from the traditional rules for the Blue Riband, and changed several times. For example, the Hales Trophy was originally only awarded for westbound records.

The trophy was awarded to just three Blue Riband holders during the express liner era; to the Italian liner Rex in 1935, the French Normandie in 1936, and the American United States in 1952. Cunard's Queen Mary, Blue Riband holder in 1936 and again from 1938 until 1952, did not receive the award for various reasons.

Following the retirement of United States in 1969 the award languished, until revived in 1990 for the Incat built passenger/car ferry Hoverspeed Great Britain when she established a new speed record for a commercial vessel on her eastbound delivery voyage without passengers that year. The trophy has been won twice since then, each time by an Incat built vessel.

== The trophy ==
In 1935, Harold Hales (1868–1942), a member of the UK Parliament and owner of a shipping company, commissioned a Sheffield goldsmith to produce a large trophy to be presented to the fastest ship crossing the Atlantic Ocean. The four-foot-tall, nearly 100-pound Hales Trophy is made of solid silver and heavy gilt fashioned with a globe resting on two winged figures of Victory standing on a base of carved green onyx, with an enamelled blue ribbon encircling the middle, and decorated with models of galleons, modern ocean liners and statues of Neptune and Amphitrite, god and goddess of the sea. The trophy is surmounted by a figure depicting speed pushing a three-stacked liner against a figure symbolizing the forces of the Atlantic, which is represented in blue enamel with the traditional ocean liner route indicated by a red enamelled line.

== History ==
The rules for the trophy did not correspond to the traditional rules for the Blue Riband, in that the trophy was to be awarded only to a passenger ship achieving the fastest speed in the westbound direction. Other rule changes further complicated the situation. For example, before the trophy was finished, Hales made arrangements to present the trophy to the owners of Rex, the then Blue Riband record-holder. In the meantime, Normandie took the record and Hales changed the rules so that any new claimant must wait three months to give the current holder a chance to beat the new record. In August 1935, the trophy was presented to the Rex, and then transferred to the Normandie two months later. Cunard White Star's Queen Mary was the next winner, but Cunard White Star refused to accept the trophy. The Queen Mary's captain explained that, "We don't believe in racing on the Atlantic, or in blue ribands, or trophies and the like." Hales again changed the rules so that the trophy could only be won by a "non-British ship".

Hales died in 1942 and the location of the trophy was unknown when the United States Lines (USL) started planning the maiden voyage of its new record breaker, the United States. The trophy was found at the Sheffield goldsmith where it had been originally made. In 1952, USL accepted the trophy at a ceremony attended by 400 guests. It was displayed in USL's New York City headquarters until after the United States was taken out of service in 1969. Ten years later, the trophy was transferred to the United States Merchant Marine Academy's museum as a relic.

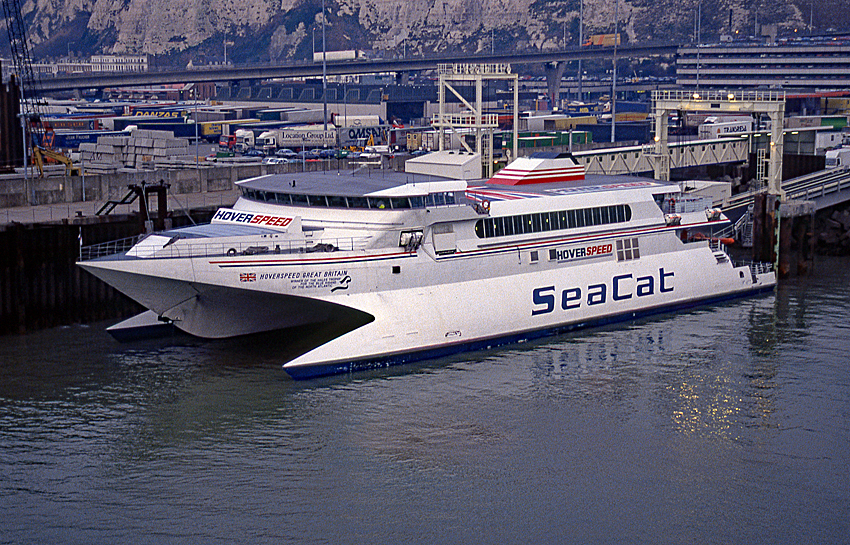
HoverSpeed Great Britain at Dover in 1992

In 1986, Richard Branson was successful in setting a new eastbound transatlantic speed record in the powerboat Challenger II. He was not awarded the Hales trophy because his boat was not a commercial vessel. In 1990, the 242-foot (74 m) catamaran passenger/car ferry Hoverspeed Great Britain was scheduled to take a delivery voyage from her Australian builders to begin cross channel operations. Her owners confirmed with the Hales trophy trustees in the UK that their vessel would be eligible for the trophy if they beat the United States record, even though the ship would not actually carry passengers on the trip.

The trustees ruled that the ship still met the criteria. After Hoverspeed Great Britain's successful voyage, the Maritime Museum considered challenging the decision on the grounds that Hales donated the award for ships providing Atlantic passenger service, but decided not to because of the cost of legal fees. In 1992, the Italian powerboat Destriero made a voyage at 53.09 knots (98.32 km/h), breaking Challenger II's record, though she was not awarded the Hales Trophy either. In June 1998 the trophy was won by Catalonia on her delivery voyage (without passengers) at 38.9 knots (72.0 km/h), followed a month later by the current holder of the Hales Trophy, the catamaran Cat-Link V for a 1998 delivery voyage at 41.3 knots (76.5 km/h). The trophy resided on the premises of the owners of Cat-Link V, Scandlines, until 2010 when they opted to put it on display in the lobby of The Danish Shipowners' Association, Amaliegade 33, Copenhagen. The Association, of which Scandlines is a member, then had it for a couple of years. An interactive screen was created and installed, telling the highlights of the trophy's history, and a longer printed version with illustrations was placed next to the trophy case for all interested to take home. The trophy was subsequently returned to Scandlines' main office in Copenhagen, where it still stands.

Several replicas of the Hales Trophy exist. In 1998 Carnival Cruise Line commissioned a replica for display on its cruise ship Paradise. They also had a duplicate made, for permanent loan to the Merchant Marine Academy Museum. Incat, the builders of the last three winners of the Hales Trophy, are in possession of a museum quality replica which is displayed at its Fast Ferry Museum in Hobart. The formal records of the Hales Trophy Trustees are now lodged with Lloyd's Register in London. Anyone wishing to access the formal records should contact Lloyds Register regarding obtaining permission to inspect the Hales Trophy Trust records.

== Table of Hales Trophy winners ==
=== 1935 to 1969 winners ===
| Ship | Flag | Year | Dates | Line | From | To | Distance | Days, hours, minutes | Speed |
|---|---|---|---|---|---|---|---|---|---|
| Rex | Italy | 1933 | 11 – 16 August | Italian | Gibraltar | Ambrose Light | 3,181 nautical miles (5,891 km; 3,661 mi) | 4 d, 13 h, 58 m | 28.92 knots (53.56 km/h; 33.28 mph) |
| Normandie | | 1935 | 30 May – 3 June | Compagnie Générale Transatlantique | Bishop Rock | Ambrose Light | 2,971 nautical miles (5,502 km; 3,419 mi) | 4 d, 3 h, 2 m | 29.98 knots (55.52 km/h; 34.50 mph) |
| (Queen Mary) | | 1936 | 20 – 24 August | (Blue Riband run; Hales Trophy not awarded) | N/A | N/A | N/A | N/A | N/A |
| Normandie | | 1937 | 29 July – 2 August | CGT | Bishop Rock | Ambrose Light | 2,906 nautical miles (5,382 km; 3,344 mi) | 3 d, 23 h, 2 m | 30.58 knots (56.63 km/h; 35.19 mph) |
| (Queen Mary) | | 1938 | 4 – 8 August | (Blue Riband run; Hales Trophy not awarded) | N/A | N/A | N/A | N/A | N/A |
| United States | | 1952 | 11 – 15 July | United States Lines | Bishop Rock | Ambrose Light | 2,906 nautical miles (5,382 km; 3,344 mi) | 3 d, 12 h, 12 m | 34.51 knots (63.91 km/h; 39.71 mph) |

=== Post 1969 winners ===
| Steamer | Year | Dates | Line | From | To | Distance | Days, hours, minutes | Speed |
|---|---|---|---|---|---|---|---|---|
| Hoverspeed Great Britain | 1990 | 23 June | Seajets:(owner); Hoverspeed:(operator) | Ambrose | Bishop Rock | 2,924 nautical miles (5,417 km) | 3 d, 7 h, 54 m | 36.6 knots (67.8 km/h; 42.1 mph) |
| Catalonia | 1998 | 9 June | Buquebus | Manhattan | Tarifa, Spain | 3,125 nautical miles (5,788 km; 3,596 mi) | 3 d, 9 h, 40 m | 38.9 knots (72.0 km/h; 44.8 mph) |
| Cat-Link V | 1998 | 18 – 20 July | Scandlines | New York | Bishop Rock | 2,815 nautical miles (5,213 km; 3,239 mi) | 2 d, 20 h, 9 m | 41.3 knots (76.5 km/h; 47.5 mph) |

== See also ==
- Virgin Atlantic Challenge Trophy
- Columbus Atlantic Trophy
