= Speed Jet =

High-speed craft

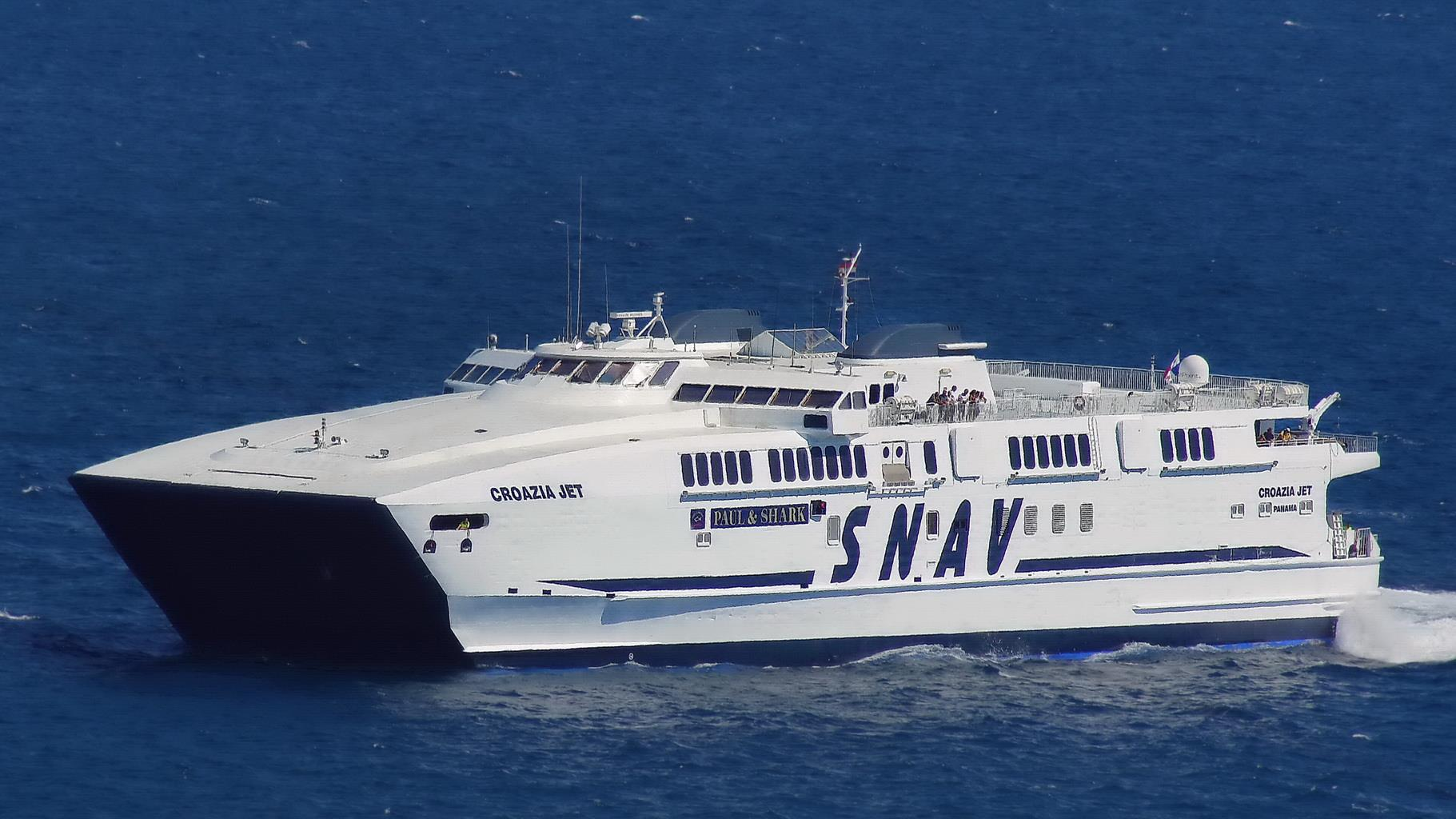
- Croazia Jet as seen off Split on July 08, 2012.

History

Cyprus
- Name: Felix (1996–2000); Felix E (2000–2001); Felix (2001–2002); Croazia Jet (2002–2022); Speed Jet (2022–present)
- Owner: (1996–2022) SNAV–Messina, (2022–present) Seajets,
- Port of registry: Limassol, Cyprus
- Builder: Austal, Henderson, Western Australia
- Yard number: 52
- Laid down: 1 August 1995
- Launched: 1 October 1996
- Maiden voyage: 1996
- In service: 1996
- Home port: Ancona (in summer); Naples (in winter)
- Identification: IMO number: 9140918
- Status: Laid up at Chalkis

General characteristics
- Type: Passenger/Roll-on/roll-off carrier
- Tonnage: 5,307 GT
- Length: 82.3 m (270 ft 0 in) oa
- Beam: 24 m (78 ft 9 in)
- Draught: 2.8 m (9 ft 2 in)
- Speed: 40 knots (74 km/h; 46 mph)
- Capacity: Cars 156; Passengers 650

Speed Jet is a high-speed craft owned and operated by Greek/Cypriot ferry company Seajets. The ship was built in 1996 by the Australian shipyard Austal; its length is 83 metres (272 ft 4 in) and can achieve the speed of nearly 40 knots (74 km/h; 46 mph). The capacity of the vessel is 156 cars and 650 passengers.

== Service ==
The catamaran, the second of a series of four sister ships, was launched on 10 August 1996 as Felix at the Austal shipyard in Henderson, Western Australia, where it was completed in October and renamed Felix I. Following this, the new fast ferry sailed from Australia to Malmö, where it was handed over to SweFerry on 18 November and renamed the following day, again as Felix. On 1 December, it finally entered service under the Scandlines flag on the Limhamn – Dragør route, replacing 'However, just three years later, on 31 October 1999, following the opening of the new Øresund Bridge, the catamaran was laid up in Helsingborg and put up for sale, being subsequently transferred to Fredericia in May 2000. In August it was finally chartered for two years to FerryMed and on 2 September it sailed from Denmark to A Coruña, starting in October on the routes between Algeciras and Ceuta, in the Strait of Gibraltar. However, just a month later, due to the failure to obtain the necessary permits to operate, the catamaran was laid up in Algeciras, where it remained until 13 October 2001, when it was transferred to nearby Gibraltar and put up for sale.

In February 2002, after almost two years of disarmament, the catamaran was purchased by SNAV, from which it was transferred to the shipyards of La Valletta, where it was renamed Croazia Jet and restructured, in view of entering into service on the connections between Ancona and Split and Pescara and Lesina, in which it was then put into service on 8 June. Over the years, the catamaran continued to regularly serve the route, remaining instead laid up in nearby Ravenna during the winter, until 7 September 2010, when it was laid up in Naples due to the shallow waters of the Abruzzo port, returning to service only in the 2014 summer season, at the end of which, the Croazia Jet was put up for sale and purchased in March 2015 by the Venezuelan company Conferry, which transferred it to America, placing it on the connections between El Guamache and Port of Spain, thus connecting the Venezuelan island of Margarita to the Trinidadian island of Trinidad. However, even on this occasion, after just three years, in August 2018, the catamaran was laid up in Venezuela.

In November 2021, after three years of searching for buyers, the catamaran was purchased by the Greek company Seajets, from which it was transferred in December to Tembladora, near Port of Spain, where it was renamed Speed Jet. In September 2022, it then set sail from Trinidad under tow by the tug Duke II to the shipyards in Chalcis.

== Sister ships ==
- Tallink AutoExpress 2
- Power Jet
- Avemar Dos
