= P&O Irish Sea =

Former trading name of P&O Ferries

- Predecessor: P&O European Ferries
- Founded: 1998
- Defunct: 2010
- Fate: rebranded as P&O Ferries
- Headquarters: Copse Road, Fleetwood (until 2004), England
- Area served: Irish Sea
- Services: Passenger transportation Freight transportation
- Owner: P&O Ferries
- Parent: P&O
- Website: www.poirishsea.com
- Footnotes P&O House Flag

P&O Irish Sea was the trading name of P&O Ferries in the Irish Sea from 1998 to 2010, when it was rebranded P&O Ferries.

== History ==
The P&O Irish Sea brand was formed in 1998 by merging the ferry operations of Pandoro Ltd (who operated freight-orientated routes between England, Scotland and France to Ireland) into P&O European Ferries (Felixstowe) Ltd. The merged company was renamed P&O European Ferries (Irish Sea) Ltd and headquartered in the former head office of Pandoro at Copse Road in Fleetwood. Only the Cairnryan based service of P&O European Ferries (Felixstowe) Ltd transferred to the merged company.

In 1999, P&O Irish Sea announced its intention to purchase two purpose-built Ro-Pax's (roll-on, roll-off, vehicle/passenger) vessels from Mitsubishi of Japan for the Larne - Cairnryan and Liverpool – Dublin routes. This would allow the transfer of the European Leader to the Fleetwood - Larne route and sale of Pride of Rathlin. The new ships would be European Causeway and European Ambassador and were delivered in 2000 and 2001 respectively. An additional ship for the Larne - Cairnryan route was ordered in 2000 and delivered in 2002 as European Highlander.

In 2004, P&O sold its Fleetwood – Larne service to Stena Line. In addition to the service rights, European Leader, European Pioneer and European Seafarer were also sold to the Stena Sphere. At the same time, P&O announced the closure of the Mostyn – Dublin service due to low passenger numbers; this led to the sale of European Ambassador and European Envoy for further service in Europe. Originally the company had also intended to sell the Liverpool - Dublin route to Stena, but this was blocked on competition grounds. In 2005, the company withdrew from the Rosslare – Cherbourg route; this was taken over by a new company, Celtic Link Ferries, who also purchased European Diplomat. In 2014 this route was also taken over by Stena Line.

During 2006, P&O's ferry and port operations were taken over by DP World. In 2010, P&O Irish Sea, which had been run from the parent company's offices in Dover since the withdrawal from Fleetwood in 2004, was rebranded as part of P&O Ferries. Officially the company name remains as P&O European Ferries (Irish Sea) Ltd, however. This rebranding coincided with other changes within the P&O Ferries group of companies such as the closure of the Portsmouth - Bilbao route.

== Routes ==
P&O Irish Sea operated many routes across the Irish Sea:

- Cairnryan – Larne - conventional ferries (all year round with fast craft service during conventional ferries refit period; in 2013 this was 10 May to 10 June). P&O Ferries currently operates this route.
- Troon – Larne - fast craft service (Spring to Autumn). This route no longer exists.
- Liverpool – Dublin - conventional ferries (all year round). Stena Line currently operates this route.
- Fleetwood – Larne (route and ships sold to Stena Line in 2004). This route no longer exists.
- Mostyn – Dublin (2001–2004). This route no longer exists.
- Ardrossan – Larne (service changed to Troon - Larne in 2001). This route's final commercial crossing was made on 30 September 2015.
- Rosslare – Cherbourg (route and ship taken over by Celtic Link Ferries in 2005; now operated by Brittany Ferries)
- Dublin – Cherbourg (2001–2004). This route no longer exists though a new route linking the two ports has since been established by Irish Ferries.

== Fleet ==
P&O Irish Sea operated a large fleet of vessels during its twelve years in operation.

Name	Built	In service	Tonnage	Fate
Celtic Star	1991	1999–2003; 2008–2010	11,086 GT	Returned to owner (chartered)
European Ambassador	2000	2000–2004	24,206 GT	Sold to Stena Line
European Causeway	2000	2000–2010	20,646 GT	Continued service with P&O Ferries
European Diplomat	1978	2001–2005	18,732 GT	Sold to Celtic Link Ferries
European Endeavour	1978	1998–2002	8,097 GT	Sold to Transeuropa Ferries
European Endeavour	2000	2007–2019	22,152 GT	Sold to Eckerö Line
European Envoy	1979	1998–2004	6,310 GT	Sold to Kystlink
European Highlander	2002	2002–2010	20,464 GT	Continued service with P&O Ferries
European Leader	1975	1998–2004	12,879 GT	Sold to Stena Line
European Mariner	1978	1998–2010	1,598 GT	Broken up in 2011
European Navigator	1976	1998–2002	3,809 GT	Sold to AB Maritime
European Pathfinder	1976	1998–2002	3,335 GT	Sold to Transeuropa Ferries
European Pioneer	1975	1998–2004	10,957 GT	Sold to Stena Line
European Seafarer	1975	1998–2004	10,957 GT	Sold to Stena Line
Express	1998	2005–2010	5,902 GT	Continued service with P&O Ferries
Jetliner	1996	1998–2000	4,675 GT	Returned to owner (chartered)
Norbank	1994	2002–2010	17,464 GT	Continued service with P&O Ferries
Norbay	1993	2002–2010	17,654 GT	Continued service with P&O Ferries
Norcape	1979	2010–2010	14,087 GT	Continued service with P&O Ferries
Pride of Rathlin	1973	1998–2000	12,503 GT	Sold to Indonesian ferry operator
RR Triumph	1997	2006–2007	7,606 GT	Returned to owner (chartered)
Superstar Express	1998	2000–2004	5,517 GT	Returned to owner (chartered)
