= Avemar Dos =

Austal high-speed catamaran

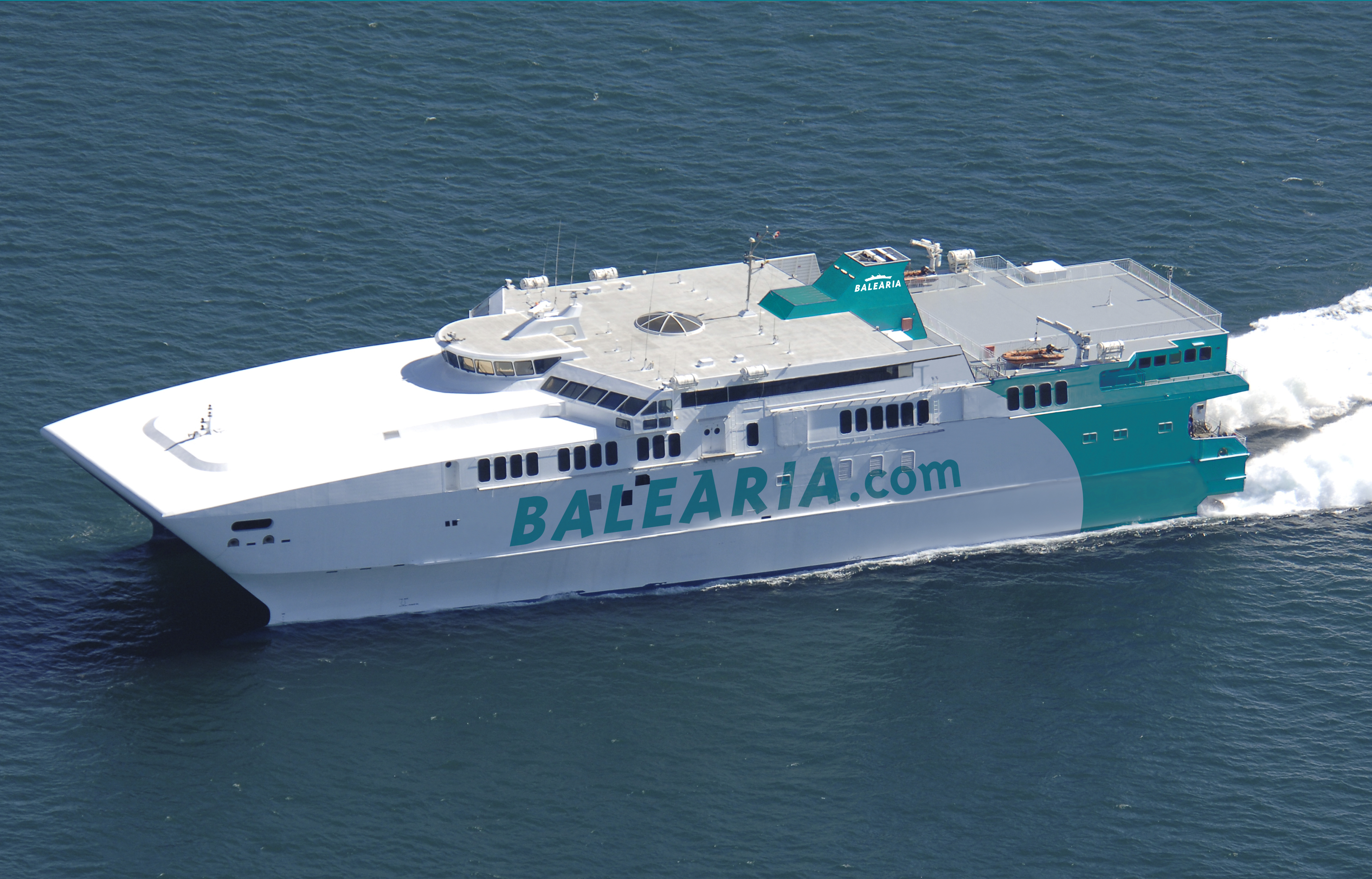
- Avemar Dos at the Strait of Gibraltar

History
- Name: (1997): SuperStar Express; (1997–1998): SuperStar Express Langkawi; (1998): SuperStar Express; (1998–1999): SuperStar Express Langkawi; (1999–2005): SuperStar Express; (2005–present): Avemar Dos
- Owner: (1997–2005): Star Cruises; (2005–2008): Buquebus España; (2008–present): Baleària
- Operator: (1997–1999): Star Cruises / P&O European Ferries (charter); (1999–2004): P&O Irish Sea (charter); (2005–2008): Buquebus España; (2008–present): Baleària
- Port of registry: (1997–2005): Panama City, Panama; (2005–present): Santa Cruz de Tenerife, Spain
- Route: Algeciras – Ceuta; Tarifa – Tangier City
- Ordered: 1996
- Builder: Austal Ships Pty Ltd; Fremantle, Western Australia
- Yard number: 60
- Launched: 24 June 1997
- Completed: 17 November 1997
- Acquired: 2008 (via acquisition of Buquebus España)
- In service: 1997
- Identification: IMO number: 9170183; Call sign: EALH; MMSI number: 224534000
- Status: In service

General characteristics
- Class & type: Austal Auto Express 82
- Tonnage: 5,517 GT; 415 DWT
- Length: 82.30 m (270 ft 0 in)
- Beam: 23.00 m (75 ft 6 in)
- Draft: 2.86 m (9 ft 5 in)
- Decks: 3
- Installed power: 4 × MTU 1163 M84 diesel engines (total 26,000 kW) (2021–present); Former: 4 × MTU 20V 1163 TB73L diesel engines (total 26,000 kW) (1997–2021)
- Propulsion: 4 × KaMeWa waterjets
- Speed: 34.0 knots (63.0 km/h; 39.1 mph) (service) 41.0 knots (75.9 km/h; 47.2 mph) (max)
- Capacity: 855 passengers; 174 cars
- Notes: Repowered in 2021 with an upgraded MTU automation and remote monitoring system to lower carbon emissions.

Avemar Dos is an 82-metre high-speed passenger and vehicle catamaran ferry operated by the Spanish shipping line Baleària. Built in Australia by Austal in 1997, the vessel began her career as SuperStar Express, serving under charters for Star Cruises, P&O European Ferries, and P&O Irish Sea across the English Channel and the Irish Sea. She was acquired by Buquebus España in 2005 and renamed Avemar Dos, operating in the Strait of Gibraltar. Since being integrated into the Baleària fleet, she has primarily served the high-traffic Algeciras–Ceuta crossing, undergoing a major ecological repowering in 2021 to fit cleaner, modern engines.

== Service ==
The catamaran, the last of a series of four sister units, was launched on 11 October 1997 at the Austal specialist shipyard in Fremantle as Superstar Express and delivered on 21 November to the Malaysian company Star Cruises, who launched it four days later on the Butterworth - Langkawi route, inaugurating the company's ferry service. Shortly afterwards, it was renamed Superstar Express Langkawi and transferred in 1998 to the Butterworth - Tanjung Balai - Phuket routes. However, in May, after less than a year of service in the Andaman Sea, the ferry was chartered to P&O Ferries, who renamed it Superstar Express and launched it on 16 May on the Portsmouth - Cherbourg cross- Channel route. In the following years, the fast ferry continued to be used in the summer by P&O Ferries, remaining laid up in Great Britain in the winter, then being transferred in 2000, following the entry into service of the Portsmouth Express, to the services between Larne and Cairnryan, extended in 2003 to Troon.

On 1 August 2005, after seven years of service on routes to and from the United Kingdom, the last three of which were spent in the Irish Sea, the catamaran, again replaced by the Express, was sold to the Spanish subsidiary of the Uruguayan Buquebus, from which it was transferred to the Algeciras shipyards, where it underwent major renovation works, at the end of which, in October, it was renamed Avemar Dos and put on the Algeciras - Ceuta routes on 1 November. On 29 November 2006, while sailing in the Strait of Gibraltar, the catamaran was rammed by Express Atlas. In 2008, with the closure of the Spanish branch and the definitive transfer of all activities to the Río de la Plata, the catamaran was chartered to Baleària, from which it was purchased outright in April 2010, continuing to operate on the connections between Algeciras and Ceuta, where it was used until 8 May 2025, when it was moved to those between Tarifa and Tangier.

== Sister ships ==
- Power Jet
- Speed Jet
- Tallink AutoExpress 2
