= MS ANT 1 =

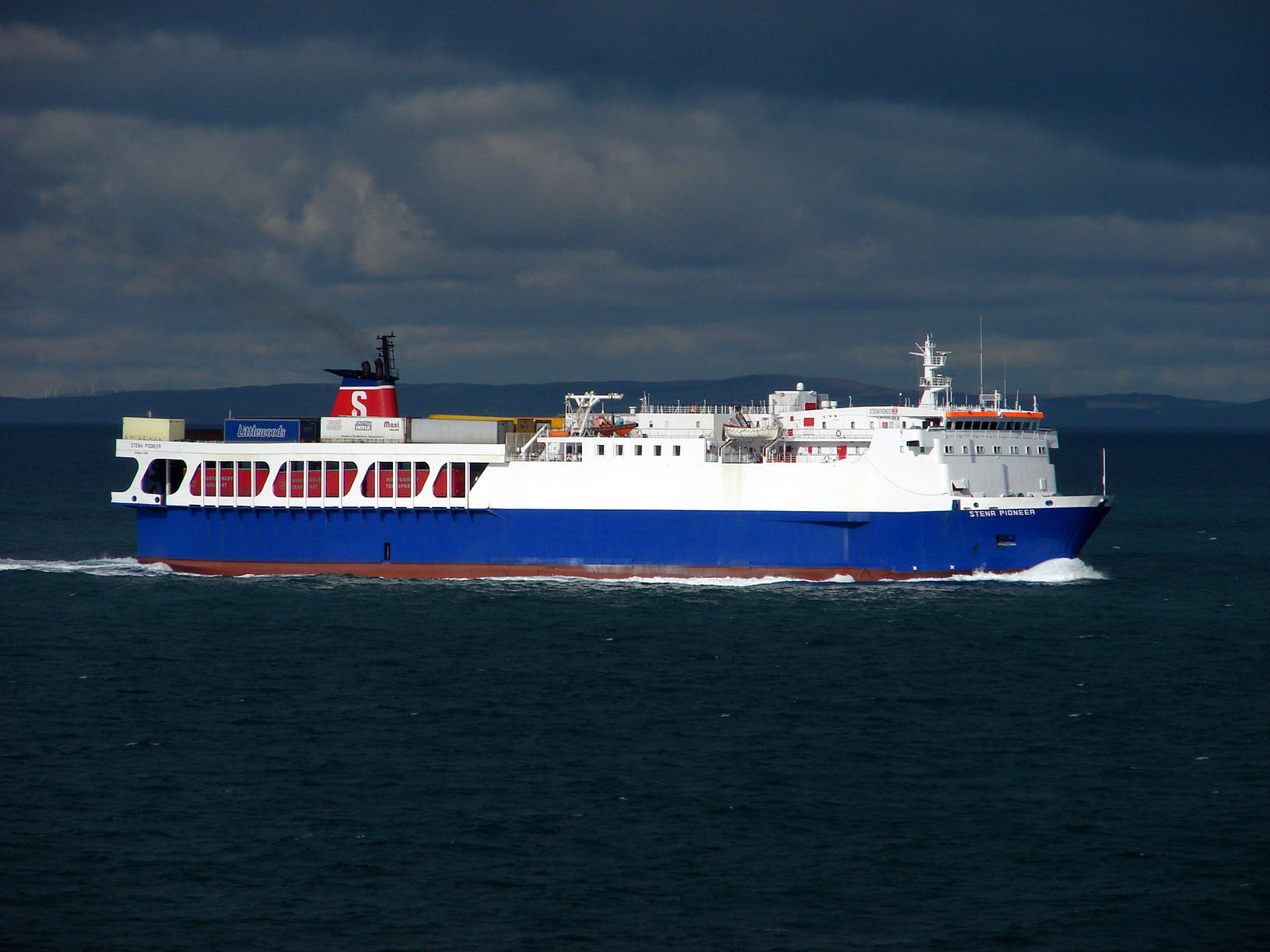
- Stena Pioneer

History
- Name: 1975–1997: Bison; 1997–2004: European Pioneer; 2004–2011: Stena Pioneer; 2011–2014: Ant 1
- Operator: 1975–1989: Pandoro; 1989–1993: B&I Line; 1993–1998: Pandoro; 1998–2004: P&O Irish Sea; 2004–2011: Stena Line; 2011–2014: Anrusstrans
- Port of registry: 1975–1997: London, United Kingdom; 1997–2011: Hamilton, Bermuda; 2011–2014: Giurgiuleşti, Moldova
- Builder: J. J. Sietas Shiffswerft, Hamburg
- Yard number: 755
- Laid down: 13 August 1974
- Launched: 31 October 1974
- Acquired: 24 January 1975
- Identification: Call sign: ERMU; IMO number: 7361570; MMSI number: 214181321
- Fate: Scrapped in Aliağa in 2014

General characteristics
- Length: 142.81 m (468 ft 6 in)
- Beam: 22.02 m (72 ft 3 in)
- Draught: 4.70 m (15 ft 5 in)
- Installed power: 2 x Klöckner-Humboldt-Deutz 12M540
- Speed: 18.5 Knots
- Capacity: 76 passengers
- Crew: 34

MS ANT 1 was a ro-ro ferry operated by Stena Line between Larne, Northern Ireland and Fleetwood, England. The ferry did not carry passengers, insteading solely carrying freight.

== History ==
The Stena Pioneer was built in 1975 as the Bison. Initially ordered by Stena Line, the vessel was sold before entering service to P&O subsidiary Pandoro.

To cope with the increased traffic on the Fleetwood – Larne route the Bison was sent to the River Tyne in 1980 for lengthening. The vessel was cut in two and a new 15-metre section added.

In 1989 the Bison was chartered to B&I Line for four years and placed on the Dublin – Liverpool route.

On return from her B&I Line charter the Bison was rebuilt to meet the latest SOLAS requirements. This involved adding sponsons increasing the vessels breadth by 4 meters. Following this rebuilding the vessel's seakeeping was badly affected. To cure this the Bison was sent to Cammell Laird in 1995 to have additional weight in the form of an extra vehicle deck added to the stern.

In 1998 Pandoro merged with P&O European Ferries to form P&O Irish Sea. The Bison was renamed European Pioneer.

In 2004 the ship passed into the hands of Stena Line. and was renamed Stena Pioneer.

In December 2010 the Stena Pioneer was laid up following the closure of the Fleetwood - Larne route. The Pioneer was sold to a Russian operator in June 2011 and renamed ANT 1.

Ant 1 & Ant 2 + Anna Marine (all the "Three Sisters") were scrapped at Aliağa Ship Breaking Yard in February 2014.
