= European Causeway =

Ship built in 2000

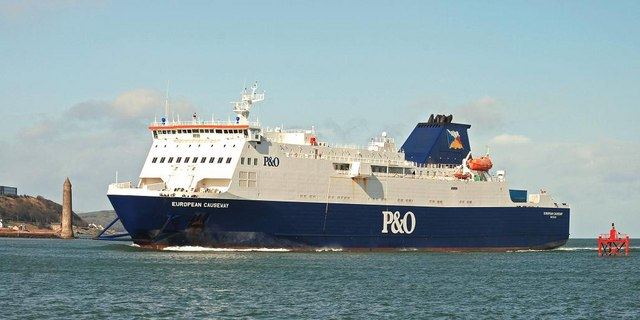
- European Causeway at Larne

History
- Name: European Causeway
- Owner: P&O Ferries
- Operator: P&O Ferries (2010 – present); P&O Irish Sea (2000–2010)
- Port of registry: Nassau, Bahamas
- Route: Cairnryan-Larne
- Ordered: 1998
- Builder: Mitsubishi Heavy Industries
- Yard number: 1065
- Laid down: 1999
- Launched: 20 March 2000
- Completed: 2000
- In service: August 2000
- Identification: IMO number: 9208394; MMSI number: 311027000; Callsign: C6RG7
- Status: In service

General characteristics
- Tonnage: 20,646 GT
- Length: 156.2 m (512 ft 6 in)
- Beam: 23.4 m (76 ft 9 in)
- Draught: 5.5 m (18 ft 1 in)
- Propulsion: 4 x Wärtsilä 12V38
- Speed: 23 knots (43 km/h; 26 mph)
- Capacity: 410 passengers; 375 cars
- Crew: 55

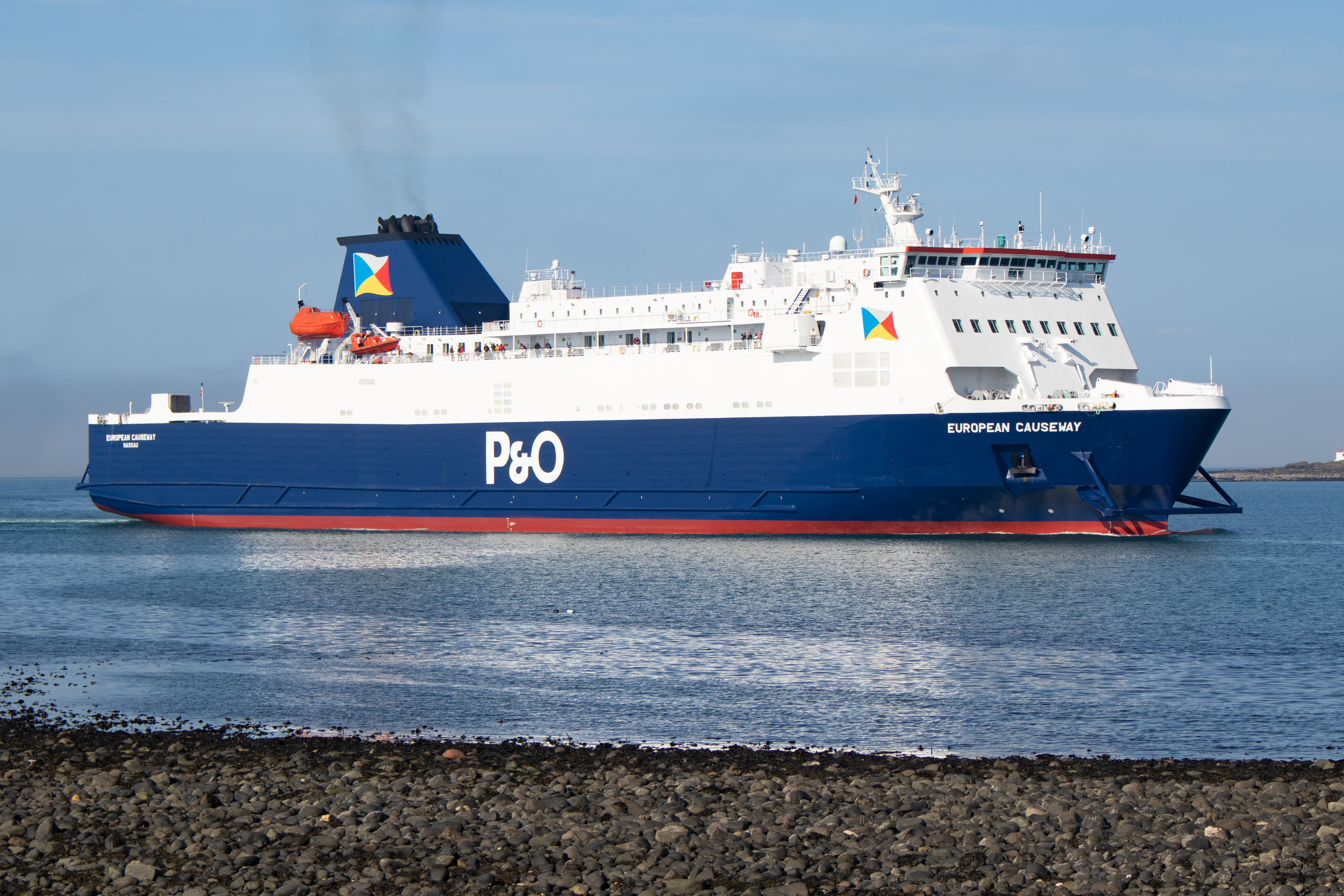
European Causeway at Larne in 2023

European Causeway is a ferry operated by P&O Ferries. She was built at Mitsubishi Heavy Industries Shimonoseki shipyard in Japan.

== History ==
European Causeway entered service in August 2000 replacing Pride of Rathlin. She was specially designed for the Cairnryan-Larne route and has not operated in service away from this route, only straying for refit periods.

== Incidents ==
On 18 December 2018, European Causeway was involved in an incident in extreme weather conditions. After what was described as a "big dip", several lorries toppled sideways causing damage to other vehicles on the car deck. No injuries were reported. The Marine Accident Investigation Branch carried out an investigation. It was concluded that:

- The route being followed had not been adjusted sufficiently to mitigate the effects of the sea conditions and reduce the likelihood of severe rolling.
- The cargo lashings applied were insufficient for the forecasted weather conditions and the ship’s approved cargo securing manual provided limited guidance to ship’s staff.
- Drivers remaining in their vehicles during the ferry’s passage, in contravention of international regulations and company policy, was not uncommon and is an industry-wide issue.

In March 2022, the vessel was detained at Larne by the Maritime & Coastguard Agency, due to "failures on crew familiarisation, vessel documentation and crew training", after a new crew was installed, following P&O sacking 800 staff.

On 27 April 2022, European Causeway suffered a complete power loss just off the coast of Larne. The Royal National Lifeboat Institution dispatched three lifeboats to the vessel's location, a coastguard helicopter was dispatched and the Queen Victoria stood by to assist if required. The ship recovered power after roughly two hours adrift and continued the voyage to Larne under her own power, escorted by the lifeboats.

== Sister Ships ==
European Causeway does not have an exact sister ship, however P&O ordered two further vessels based on her design:-

- European Ambassador Built 2000.

Enlarged version built for P&O Irish Sea's Liverpool-Dublin service. Differences include more powerful engines for higher service speed, full bow ramp for landing on linkspans, large stern ramp, passenger cabins, club lounge and revised crew facilities.

- European Highlander Built 2002

Enlarged version built for P&O Irish Sea as a partner to European Causeway. Differences include minor revisions to the passenger deck layout, additional passenger lifts and the use of larger lifeboats rather than Marine evacuation systems
