= Eurochampion Jet 2 =

Ocean-going catamaran

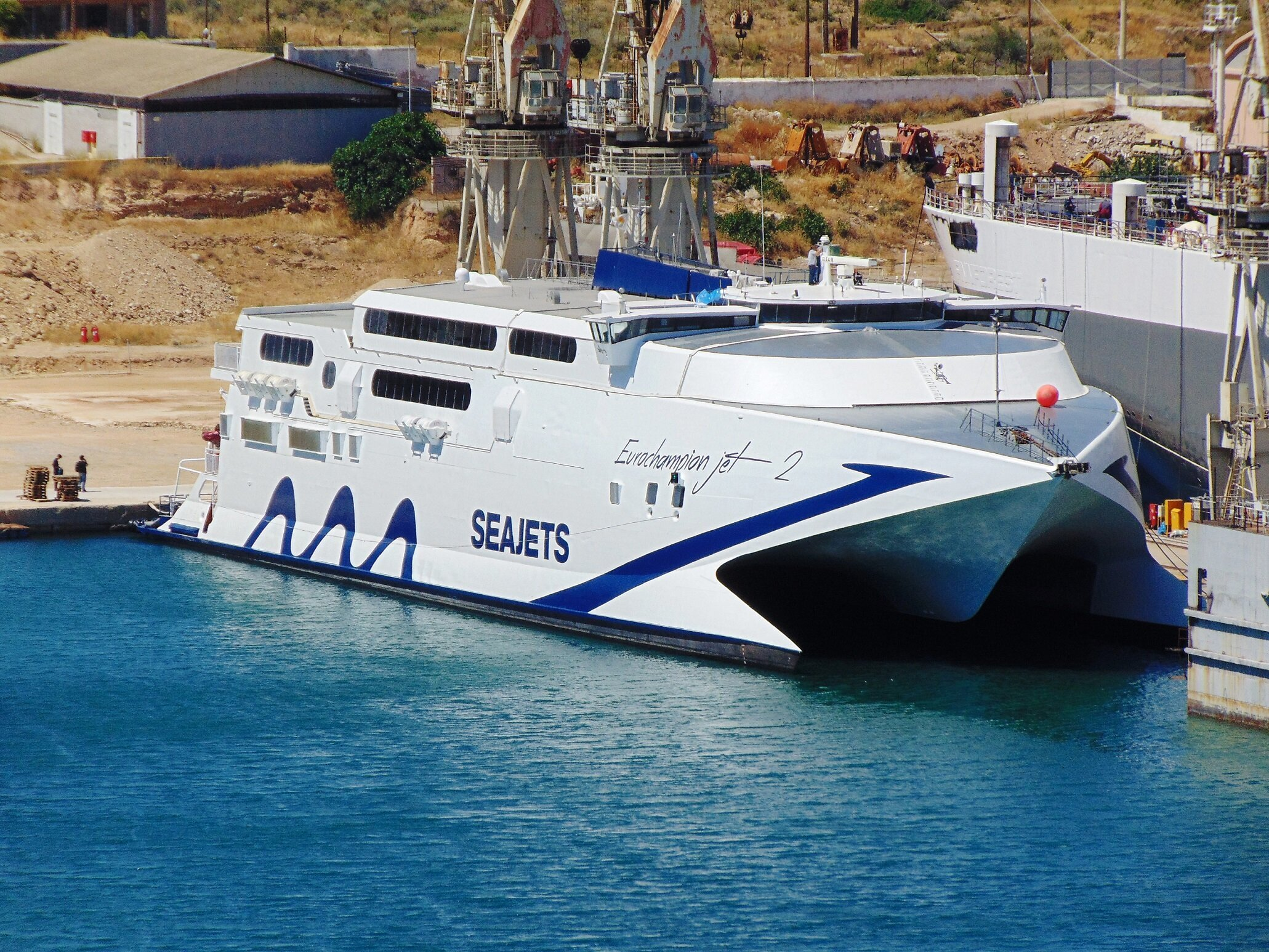
- Eurochampion Jet 2 in Salamis in June 2026

History
- Name: Cat-Link V (1997-1999); Mads Mols (1999-2005); Incat 049 (2005-2006); Master Cat (2006-2008); Fjord Cat (2008-2020); Skane Jet (2020-2025); Eurochampion Jet 2 (2025-present)
- Operator: Cat Link (1998-1999); Mols-Linien (1999-2005); Laid up (2005-2006); Master Ferries (2006-2008); Fjord Line (2008-2020); FRS (2020-2025); Seajets (2025-)
- Builder: Incat, Tasmania, Australia
- Yard number: 049
- Launched: 14 June 1998
- Home port: Hirtshals, Denmark (2007-2020); Limassol, Cyprus (2020-present)
- Identification: IMO number: 9176060
- Status: In service

General characteristics
- Tonnage: 5,619 GT
- Length: 91.30 meters
- Beam: 26.0 meters
- Draught: 3.70 meters
- Installed power: 4 × Ruston 20RK 270 (28800kW total)
- Propulsion: 4 × Wartsila LJ145D waterjets
- Speed: 41 knots (76 km/h; 47 mph) service speed; 48 knots (89 km/h; 55 mph) maximum speed
- Capacity: 900 passengers; 240 cars

Eurochampion Jet 2 is an Incat-built, ocean-going catamaran. It is one of the world's fastest car carrying passenger vessels and, as Cat-Link V, set the eastbound record for the fastest transatlantic journey in July 1998 becoming the holder of the Hales Trophy. In 1998/1999, the ship sailed as Cat-Link V on the Århus-Kalundborg route in Denmark—then operated by Scandlines. From 1999 to 2005 it sailed as Mads Mols for Mols-linien. From 2005 to 2006 it was renamed Incat 049 by T&T Ferries in Trinidad & Tobago. In 2006 it was renamed Master Cat and has since been operating on the route between Kristiansand in Norway and Hanstholm in Denmark, later changed to Hirtshals, in the service of "Master Ferries". This company was merged with Fjord Line on 1 January 2008 and the ferry was renamed Fjord Cat.

The ship was renamed "Skane Jet" as part of its relocation for the Königslinie route between Sassnitz and Ystad for FRS. This route started service in late September 2020.

In October 2025 it was purchased by Seajets and renamed Eurochampion Jet 2.

== Sister ships ==
- Eurochampion Jet
- Superexpress
- T&T Express

Records
Preceded by Catalonia	Atlantic Eastbound Record; 1998 – present	Incumbent
Preceded by Catalonia	Hales Trophy; 1998 – present	Incumbent
