= Tallink AutoExpress 2 =

1997 ferry

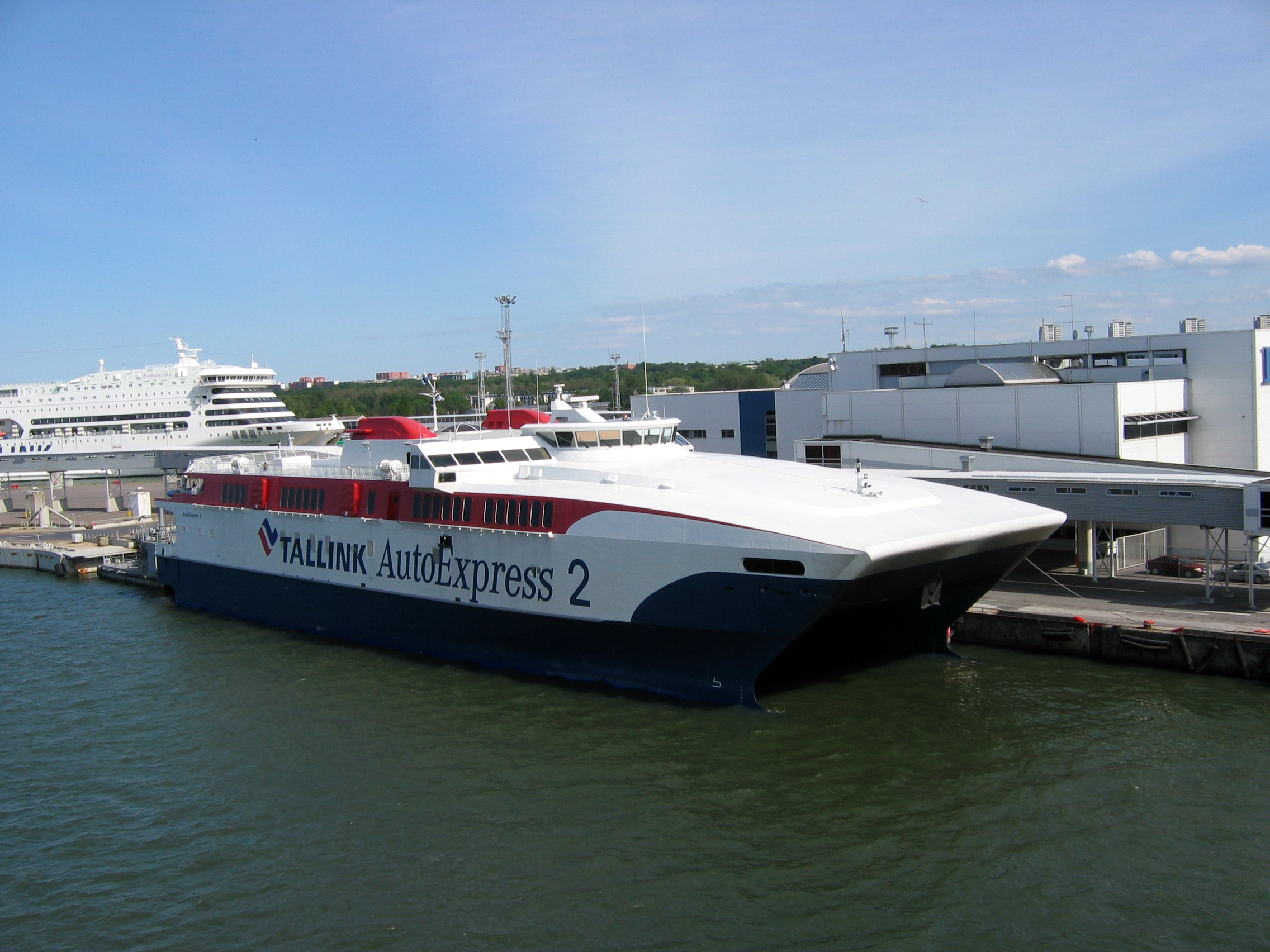
- Tallink AutoExpress 2 at quay 8 in Port of Tallinn on June 21, 2007.

History
- Name: 1997–2001: Boomerang; 2001–2018: Tallink AutoExpress 2
- Owner: 1997–2001: Sea Tropid, Cyprus; 2001–2007: Tallink; 2007–2009: HansaLink, Cyprus; 2009–2018: Conferry
- Operator: 1997–2001: Polferries; 2001–2007: Tallink; 2007–2018: Conferry
- Port of registry: 1997–2001: Nassau, Bahamas; 2001–2007: Tallinn, Estonia; 2007–2008: Kingstown, Saint Vincent and the Grenadines; 2008–2009: Limassol, Cyprus; 2009–2018: Pampatar, Venezuela
- Builder: Austal, Henderson, Western Australia
- Yard number: 53
- Launched: 1 March 1997
- Completed: 12 October 1997
- Out of service: 2018
- Identification: IMO number: 9150286; Call sign YYKT (from 2009); MMSI number: 775504000 (from 2009)
- Fate: Sank and later scrapped

General characteristics
- Tonnage: 5,419 GT
- Length: 82.3 m (270 ft 0 in)
- Beam: 23.0 m (75 ft 6 in)
- Draught: 2.8 m (9 ft 2 in)
- Installed power: 4 x MTU 20V 1163 TB73 diesel engines
- Propulsion: 4 x Kamewa waterjets
- Speed: 38 knots (service speed)
- Capacity: 700 passengers; 175 cars

Tallink AutoExpress 2 was a fast passenger ferry (catamaran) operated by the Venezuelan ferry company Conferry on the line between Puerto la Cruz and Punta de Piedras, Margarita Island. She sank in 2018 and later she was scrapped.

== History ==
Boomerang was built in 1997 by Austal in Henderson, Western Australia to its "AutoExpress 82" design and owned by Sea Tropid Co. Ltd., Cyprus for operation by Polferries between Świnoujście, Poland and Malmö, Sweden. In 2001 the ship was bought by Tallink and renamed Tallink AutoExpress 2, for the Tallinn, Estonia, to Helsinki, Finland route. On 12 October 2007, the ship collided with HSuperSeaCat Three in Tallinn harbour, resulting a metre-long hole in the ship's side. There were no serious injuries incurred.

On 3 November 2007, Tallink AutoExpress 2 arrived at Curaçao Drydocks prior to service with Conferry, a ferry operator in Venezuela, under a two-year charter on their domestic Punta de Piedras, Isla Margarita–Puerto La Cruz route. The ferry was bought by Conferry in 2009. In 2017 it was taken out of operation and laid up at Guanta due to lack of funds caused by economic crisis in Venezuela.

Tallink AutoExpress 2 partially sank at her berth at Guanta on 6 August 2018, due to a lack of proper maintenance. In December 2021, she was broken up at the DIANCA shipyard in Puerto Cabello, Venezuela.

== Sister ships ==
- Speed Jet
- Power Jet
- Avemar Dos
