= Destriero =

Italian yacht, launched 1991

History

Italy
- Name: Destriero
- Builder: Fincantieri
- Launched: 1991
- Fate: Scrapped 2023

General characteristics
- Type: Private yacht
- Displacement: 400 long tons (406 t)
- Length: 68.19 m (223.7 ft)
- Beam: 13 m (43 ft)
- Propulsion: 3 × GE Aviation LM1600 gas turbine engines, 60,000 hp (45,000 kW) total
- Speed: 67 knots (124 km/h; 77 mph)

Destriero was a 67-metre (220 ft) long, 13-metre (43 ft) wide, 400-ton displacement, yacht built by Fincantieri in their Muggiano yard at La Spezia in 1991. She was fitted with three GE Aviation LM1600 gas turbines totalling 60,000-horsepower (45,000 kW), providing her with a maximum speed of 110 kilometres per hour (68 mph; 59 kn). Destriero was built with the sponsorship of the Aga Khan IV and others specifically to cross the Atlantic Ocean in record time of 3 days and secure the Blue Riband.

In 1992 Destriero crossed the Atlantic, without refuelling, twice, firstly westbound from Tarifa Point, Spain to Ambrose Light, New York. Her eastbound voyage was from the Ambrose Light to Bishop Rock, Isles of Scilly, a distance of 3,106 nautical miles (5,752 km), at an average speed of 53.09 knots (98.32 km/h). Despite the record time of 58 hours, 34 minutes and 5 seconds, Destriero was denied the Hales Trophy, because she was classed as a "private yacht" and not a "commercial passenger vessel". Destriero did, however receive the Virgin Atlantic Challenge Trophy, awarded by former record-holder Richard Branson for the fastest crossing by any vessel, and the Columbus Atlantic Trophy sponsored by the Costa Smeralda and New York Yacht Clubs for the fastest trans-Atlantic round-trip.

The ship was laid up in HMNB Devonport dockyard, Plymouth, England for ten years, but was removed in February 2009, reportedly for Lürssen ship yard. Destriero was scrapped in 2023.
