= Eurochampion Jet =

High-speed catamaran ferry owned and operated by Seajets

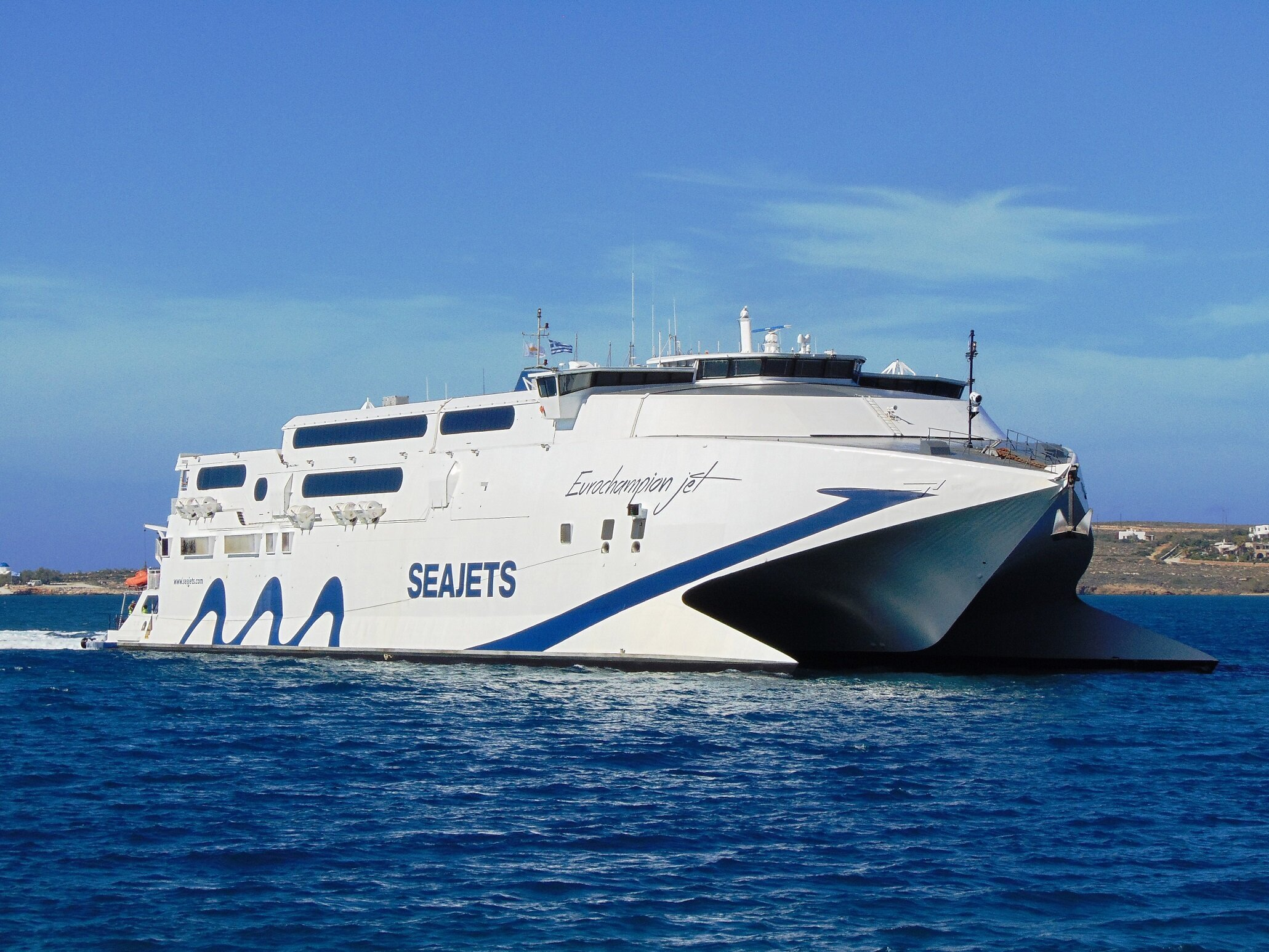
- Eurochampion Jet in Paros

History
- Name: 1998–1999: Cat-Link IV; 1994–2004: Max Mols; 2004: Max Mols (Caen Express); 2004–2018: Max Mols; 2018–2025: Max; 2025–present: Eurochampion Jet
- Owner: 1998–1999: Cat-Link; 2004–2018: Mols-Linien; 2024–present: Seajets
- Operator: 1998–1999: Cat-Link; 1999–2000: Mols-Linien; 2000: Marine Atlantic; 2000–2001: Mols-Linien; 2001: Scandlines; 2001–2002: Mols-Linien; 2002: Riga Sea Line; 2002–2004: Mols-Linien; 2004: P&O Ferries; 2004–2023: Mols-Linien; 2024–present: Seajets
- Port of registry: Limassol, CYP
- Route: Pireaus-Syros-Mykonos-Naxos-Ios-Thira-Ios-Naxos-Mykonos-Tinos-Syros-Pireaus:
- Builder: Incat, Tasmania, Australia
- Yard number: 048
- Laid down: 28 July 1997
- Launched: 28 March 1998
- In service: 1998
- Identification: IMO number: 9176058
- Status: In service

General characteristics
- Class & type: Incat Catamaran
- Tonnage: 5,617 GT; 2,311 NT; 500 DWT
- Length: 91 m (299 ft)
- Beam: 26 m (85 ft)
- Draught: 3.7 m (12 ft)
- Decks: 2
- Installed power: 4 × 7 MW
- Propulsion: 4 × Ruston 20RK270
- Speed: 48.1 knots (89.1 km/h; 55.4 mph)
- Capacity: 220 cars, 800 pax

Eurochampion Jet is a high-speed catamaran ferry owned and operated by Seajets. Launched on 1 December 1997 at the Incat shipyard in Tasmania. It has spent the majority of her career serving the Aarhus-Odden route with Mols Linien. It has frequently been chartered to other operators in the Baltic Sea and English Channel. In 2024, it was purchased by Seajets and currently operates in the Aegean Sea.

== History ==
Initially chartered to Cat-Link as Cat-Link IV she entered service between Århus and Kalundborg in May 1998. The following January the charter passed to Mols Linien and it was thus renamed Max Mols, entering service on its standing Århus-Odden route in April 1999.

It has since had three major charters each for the summer seasons of 2000, 2002 and 2004 before returning to Denmark. In 2000 the ship operated between North Sydney and Channel-Port aux Basques in Canada for Marine Atlantic, in 2002 it was chartered to Riga Sea Line for a route between Riga and Nynäshamn and the final charter was to P&O Ferries as the Max Mols (Caen Express) operating a high speed service between Portsmouth and Caen, returning to Mols Linien at the end of October.

From 2004 to 2023, the ship operated the Århus-Odden and Bornholm routes as before.

In 2024, the Max was sold to Seajets of Greece.

== Sister ships ==
Eurochampion Jet is one of four 91 metre wave piercing catamarans built by Incat.

- Incat 046
- Superexpress
- Eurochampion Jet 2
