= Superexpress =

High-speed catamaran

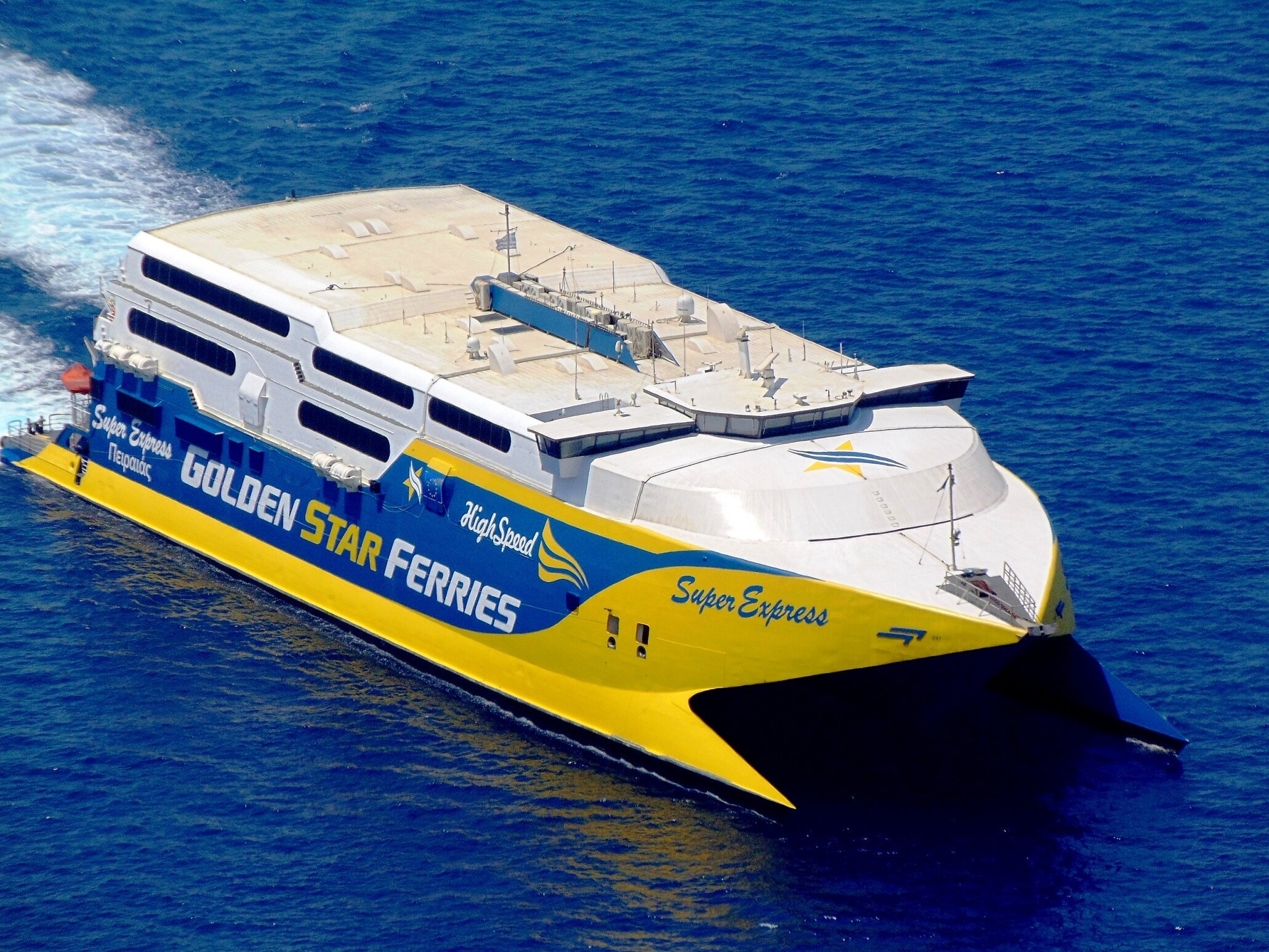
- Superexpress in Santorini in July 2024

History
- Name: Superexpress (2019 onwards); Golden Express (2018–2019); Express (2003–2018); Catalonia (2003); Express Fastcraft (2003); Catalonia (2002–2003); Portsmouth Express (2002); Catalonia (2001–2002); Portsmouth Express (2001); Catalonia (2000–2001); Portsmouth Express (2000); Catalonia L (1998–2000); Catalonia (1998)
- Owner: Golden Star Ferries
- Operator: Golden Star Ferries (2019-present); Viking Line (2017-2019); Gotlandsbåten (2015-2017); P&O Ferries (2005-2015); P&O Irish Sea (2005-2010); P&O Portsmouth (2000-2005); Buquebus (1998-2000)
- Port of registry: 1998–2000: Las Palmas, Spain; 2000–2003: Nassau, Bahamas; 2003: Montevideo, Uruguay; 2003–2016: Nassau, Bahamas; 2016–2018: Uppsala, Sweden; 2018 onwards: Piraeus, Greece
- Route: Helsinki-Tallinn
- Ordered: 1996
- Builder: Incat, Australia
- Yard number: 047
- Laid down: 12 May 1997
- Launched: 17 January 1998
- Completed: 1 May 1998
- Maiden voyage: 1998
- In service: 1998
- Identification: Call sign: SVCT8; IMO number: 9176046; MMSI number: 240139500
- Status: In service

General characteristics
- Class & type: Det Norske Veritas 1A1 HSLC R1 Car Ferry A E0
- Tonnage: 5,902 GT; 2,441 NT; 450 DWT
- Length: 91 m (299 ft)
- Beam: 26 m (85 ft)
- Draught: 3.7 m (12 ft)
- Decks: 3
- Ramps: 1 Stern ramp
- Installed power: 4 x 7200kw Caterpillar 3618 marine diesel engine through 4 x Renk ASL60 Gearboxes
- Propulsion: 4 x Lips LJ145D waterjet
- Speed: 42 knots (78 km/h; 48 mph)
- Capacity: 900 passengers; 220 vehicles
- Crew: 32

Superexpress is a 91-metre (299 ft) catamaran built by Incat, owned by Golden Star Ferries and chartered to Viking Line. During her delivery voyage on 9 June 1998, as Catalonia, she set the record for the fastest Atlantic Eastbound Record, previously held by Hoverspeed Great Britain becoming the holder of the Hales Trophy. She made the 3,125 mi (5,029 km) run from Manhattan, US to Tarifa, Spain in 3 days 7 hours 54 minutes, traveling at an average speed of 38.877 knots (72.000 km/h; 44.739 mph).

During that same voyage, the ship became the first passenger ship to cover 1,000 mi (1,600 km) or more in one 24-hour period. In covering 1,018 nautical miles (1,885 km) in one day, beating the 868 mi (1,397 km). record set by the United States in 1952. Six weeks later, sister craft Fjord Cat took the record.

As of January 2016 P&O Ferries announced that they would end the Larne-Troon service provided by Express, this has ended 25 years of fastcraft service between Northern Ireland and Scotland.

== Mediterranean service ==
Following her record-breaking Atlantic Ocean crossing, the vessel changed name to Catalonia L and entered service with Buquebus between Barcelona and Palma, Majorca and later between Ceuta, Málaga and Algeciras.

== English Channel service ==
In 2000 she was chartered to P&O Ferries for service between Portsmouth and Cherbourg replacing the smaller Superstar Express and adopted the trading name Portsmouth Express though her official name remained Catalonia. Her first season as Portsmouth Express was marred by a series of serious technical problems which at one point resulted in the Superstar Express returning to the route from P&O Irish Sea. The ship operated with P&O Portsmouth during the 2000, 2001 and 2002 summer seasons and returned to Buquebus for the rest of the year, in each summer season on the Cherbourg route the ship experienced a number of technical problems which often resulted in the ship running on three or less of its four engines. In 2002 the ship's marketing name became Express after P&O Portsmouth became part of P&O Ferries. In 2004 the ship was officially renamed Express but her marketing name became Cherbourg Express to differentiate the service from Caen Express which P&O started that year. In September 2004 the ship completed her final Portsmouth-Cherbourg sailing and the ship was laid up at A&P Birkenhead.

== Irish Sea service ==
In 2005 her charter was transferred to P&O Irish Sea and the ship once again replaced Superstar Express. Prior to her entering service with P&O Irish Sea the Club Lounge was removed and standard seating installed with the Club Bar rebranded to P&O's Harbour Coffee Company. The large shop was divided into a smaller retail outlet, gaming area, quiet lounge and 'Poets' bar. Express sailed with P&O Irish Sea on the routes between Troon/Cairnryan, Scotland and Larne, Northern Ireland. In 2010 she began operating sailings from Larne to Douglas on behalf of the Isle of Man Steam Packet Company during the Isle of Man TT season. Leaving Larne at 23:59 - arrive Douglas 2:44, Leave Douglas - 03:00 - Arrive Larne - 05:45. By doing this they have fitted it in around the normal timetable on the Larne - Cairnryan and Larne - Troon Routes.

In 2013 Express received a £500,000 interior refurbishment which included reinstatement of the Club Lounge which was removed when the ship moved to the Irish Sea. From 2013 Express no longer makes a roundtrip between Larne and Cairnryan instead operating two roundtrips between Larne Harbour and Troon. The Express charter was not renewed after the summer season ending September 2015 and is believed to be heading to run on a Scandinavian route next year. She is currently laid up in Helsingborg (Feb 2016) her P&O livery has already been painted over. P&O announced on 13 January 2016 that the Troon-Larne service was to close with immediate effect.

== Aegean service ==
After this second charter also ended, on 24 September it was sold to the newly formed Greek company Golden Fast Ferries, a joint venture between Golden Star Ferries and Fast Ferries, to which it was delivered on 11 October in Las Palmas de Gran Canaria. It was subsequently renamed Golden Express and on 9 November it sailed under tow of the tug Atenes for the Perama and Salamina shipyards, where it underwent major refitting works. However, on 10 May 2019, upon completion of the works, the joint venture was dissolved and the ownership of the catamaran passed entirely to Golden Star Ferries, from which it was renamed SuperExpress. In June she started service on the routes between Rafina, Paros, Naxos, Mykonos, Tinos, Andros and Piraeus.

In 2021 it was transferred to the connections between Rafina, Tinos, Mykonos, Naxos, Paros, Ios and Santorini. In 2023 the stopover in Naxos was abolished.

== Sister ships ==
Express is one of four 91-metre wave piercing catamarans built by Incat but differs from the other three because of her addition lounge and large scenic window over the stern. The bridge of the Express and other Incat 91 metre craft is very similar to the Incat 81 metre craft Hull 038-Rapide, Hull 040-Stena Lynx 3, Hull 041-Diamant

Sister ships

- Incat 046
- Eurochampion Jet
- Eurochampion Jet 2

== Accidents and incidents ==
=== 2022 collision (Tinos) ===
On 22 April 2022, during the evening hours, the high-speed ferry struck a rocky section within the inner harbor of Tinos during docking maneuvers. The vessel was operating its scheduled itinerary from Rafina to Andros, Tinos, and Mykonos, carrying 461 passengers, 89 cars, 5 motorcycles, and 29 crew members.

Two Hellenic Coast Guard patrol boats immediately deployed to the area, though the ship managed to refloat under its own power shortly after and docked at the outer port of Tinos, where all passengers disembarked safely. The Local Ship Inspection Team boarded the vessel and confirmed that the steering and propulsion systems were fully functional, while a private diver conducted an underwater hull survey. No injuries, water ingress, or marine pollution occurred.

The Tinos Port Authority initially issued a detention order, later clearing the vessel to sail without passengers to the port of Rafina. Upon arrival, the Central Port Authority of Rafina detained the ship until its classification society issued a certificate maintaining its class, after which it was cleared to resume operations. The remaining 187 passengers and their vehicles bound for Mykonos were transferred to their destination aboard with another ferry, Superstar.

==== 2025 collision (Mykonos) ====
On 26 May 2025, during a docking maneuver at the port of Mykonos, the vessel's bow collided with a moored tugboat and the pier. The impact caused material damage to the ship's bow and the stern of the tugboat. The vessel was operating a scheduled itinerary from Rafina to Tinos, Mykonos, Paros, Ios, and Santorini, carrying 158 passengers, 29 crew members, and 12 vehicles.

No injuries, marine pollution, or water ingress resulted from the accident. The Mykonos Port Authority initially detained the vessel, later granting permission for a single transit without passengers or cargo to the Perama repair base for technical maintenance. The operating company arranged alternative transport for the remaining passengers. Following a preliminary investigation, the ship's captain was arrested for dangerous interference with maritime transit under Article 291, Paragraph 3 of the Greek Penal Code.

Records
Preceded by Hoverspeed Great Britain	Atlantic Eastbound Record; 1998	Succeeded by Cat-Link V
Preceded by Hoverspeed Great Britain	Hales Trophy; 1998	Succeeded by Cat-Link V
