= Stena Seafarer =

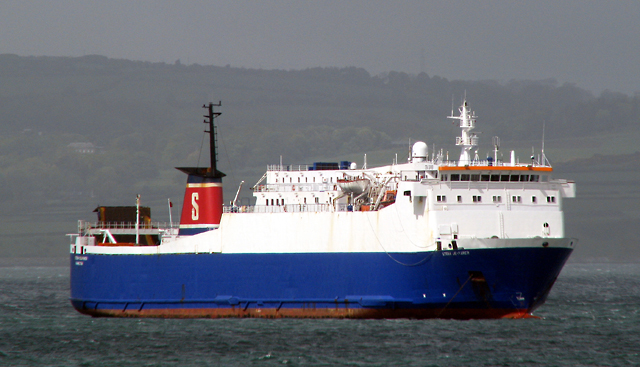
- Stena Seafarer in Belfast Lough

History
- Name: 1975-1980: Union Melbourne; 1980-1980: Union Trader; 1980-1988: Puma; 1998-2004: European Seafarer; 2004 onwards: Stena Seafarer; 2011: onwards ANT 2
- Operator: 1975-1978: Union Steamship Co; 1978-1988: Pandoro; 1998-2004: P&O Irish Sea; 2004-2011 Stena Line; 2011 onwards Anship
- Port of registry: 1975–1994: London, United Kingdom; 1994 onwards: Hamilton, Bermuda
- Builder: J.J. Sietas, Hamburg, Germany
- Launched: 3 March 1975
- Identification: IMO number: 7361594
- Fate: Scrapped 2014

General characteristics
- Tonnage: 10,957 GT
- Length: 140.81 m (462 ft 0 in)
- Beam: 19.41 m (63 ft 8 in)
- Draught: 5.80 m (19 ft 0 in)
- Installed power: 2 x Deutz SBV 12M 540
- Propulsion: 2 × controllable pitch propellers; 2 × bow thrusters

Stena Seafarer was a ro-ro ferry that operated on the service between Larne, Northern Ireland and Fleetwood, England.

She was built in 1975 for Stena Line as Union Melbourne, before being renamed Union Trader in 1980. In the same year, the ship was acquired by P&O Irish Sea, becoming Puma, then European Seafarer in 1998. In 2004 Stena Line the vessel transferred from P&O Irish Sea to Stena Line. In 2004 the ship was renamed to Stena Seafarer.

Following Stena Line's announcement in late 2010 that they were to close the Larne to Fleetwood service in the following year the ship was sold to Anship and renamed Ant 2. She was scrapped at Aliağa in 2014.
