= Duba =

Duba may refer to:

- Duba, Saudi Arabia, a town in Saudi Arabia
- Duba, Warmian-Masurian Voivodeship, a village in Poland
- Duba River, a headwater of the Căian River in Romania
- Duba, Slivno, a hamlet in the municipality of Slivno, Dubrovnik-Neretva County, Croatia
- Duba Pelješka, a village in the municipality of Trpanj, Dubrovnik-Neretva County, Croatia
- Duba Stonska, a village in the municipality of Ston, Dubrovnik-Neretva County, Croatia
- Duba, an alternative name for the Nandi bear
- Dubá, a town in the Czech Republic
- Duba, Ukraine, a village in Ukraine
- Steevan Dos Santos, a professional footballer also known as "Duba"
- Duba (surname)
  - Ali Duba, Syrian general
  - Garba Duba, Nigerian politician
  - Karel Duba, Czech musician
  - Tomáš Duba, Czech ice hockey player
