= European Highlander (2002) =

Ship built in 2002

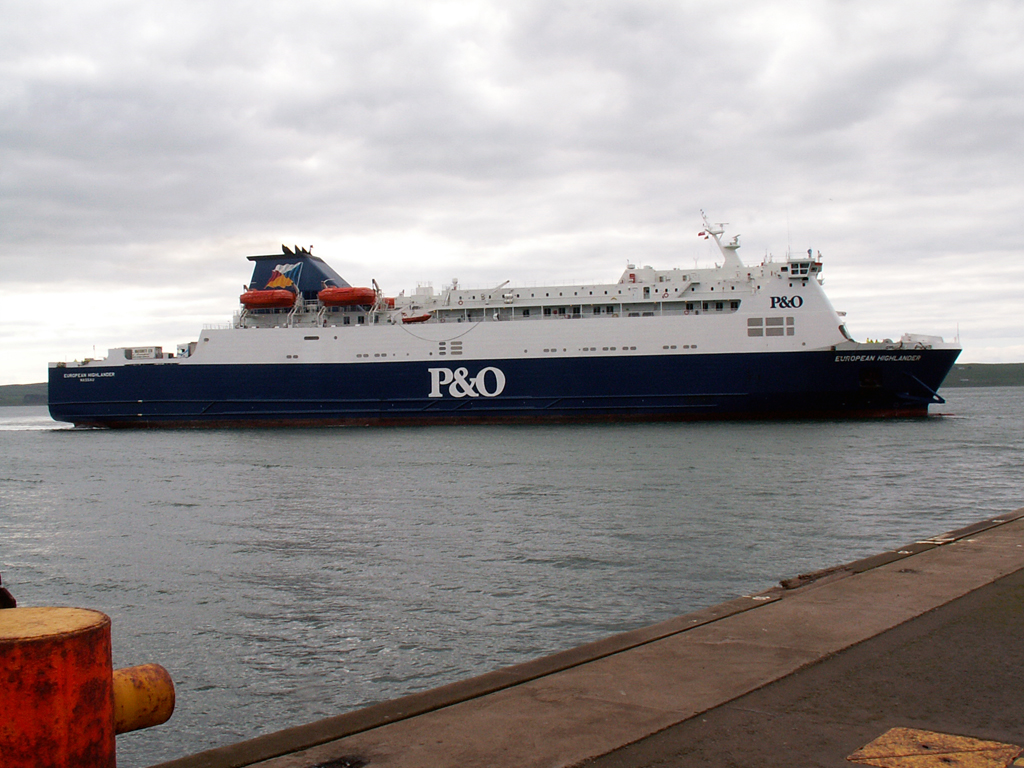
- European Highlander arriving at Cairnryan, Spring 2005.

History
- Name: European Highlander
- Owner: Barclays Mercantile Business Finance Ltd
- Operator: P&O Ferries (2010 – present); P&O Irish Sea (2002-2010)
- Port of registry: Nassau, Bahamas
- Route: Cairnryan-Larne
- Ordered: August 2000
- Builder: Mitsubishi Heavy Industries, Shimonoseki, Japan
- Cost: £35 million
- Yard number: 1069
- Launched: 18 January 2002
- Completed: 2002
- Maiden voyage: Cairnryan - Larne
- In service: 3 July 2002
- Identification: IMO number: 9244116; MMSI number: 311404000; Callsign: C6SN6
- Status: in service

General characteristics
- Tonnage: 21,188 gt
- Length: 162.7 m (533.8 ft)
- Beam: 23.4 m (76.8 ft)
- Height: 32,5
- Draft: 5.5 m (18.0 ft)
- Depth: 5,55m
- Decks: 6
- Deck clearance: 5.2m
- Ramps: 1 internal fixed, 1 internal hoistable between decks 2 & 3
- Installed power: 4 x Wärtsilä 12V38 30000kwh
- Propulsion: 2 x controllable pitch propellers
- Speed: 22.5 kn (42 km/h)
- Capacity: 410 passengers; 375 vehicles; 1,825 lanemetres
- Crew: 57

European Highlander is a ferry operated by P&O Irish Sea on their Cairnryan to Larne service. The vessel is an enlarged version of the European Causeway, the European Highlander being six metres longer. Other differences include minor revisions to the passenger deck layout, additional passenger lifts and the use of larger lifeboats rather than Marine evacuation systems. On 7 June 2012, it carried the Olympic Flame across the Irish Sea from Northern Ireland to Scotland.

== Description ==
European Highlander is a two-propeller, Roll-on-Roll off, two compartment passenger and car ferry. She is a sister ship to the European Causeway. Two controllable pitch propellers can propel the ship at 23 knots.

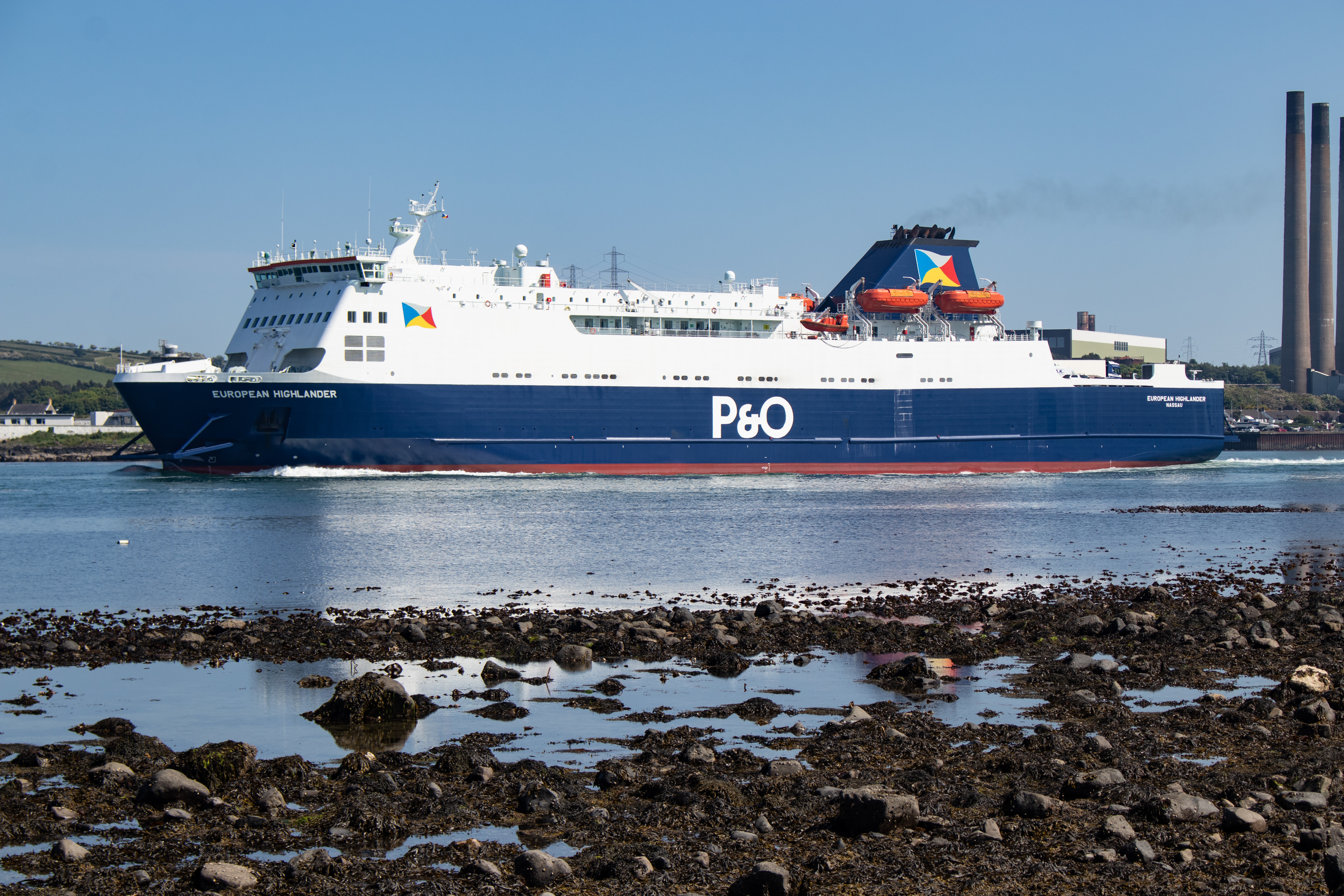
Departing Larne in June 2023.
