= Columbus Atlantic Trophy =

The Columbus Atlantic Trophy is an award for the fastest non-stop two way crossing of the Atlantic Ocean within a given time period. It was inaugurated in 1992 by New York Yacht Club in concert with Costa Smeralda Yacht Club of Sardinia.

== Trophy ==
The Columbus Atlantic Trophy is a two-foot silver goblet, which was actually given in 1928 to the NYYC by King Alfonso XIII of Spain, as the prize for the 1928 trans-Atlantic yacht race won by NYYC's yacht Elena. The trophy is available to any vessel that can set a trans-Atlantic record one way, then (within a set time-frame) set the corresponding record back. A further stipulation is that the vessel must travel without stopping, and without re-fuelling en route.

== History ==
At the time of its inauguration the non-stop east–west record was that set by the American liner United States in July 1952, on her return to the US, crossing in 84 hours 12 minutes at an average speed of 34.51 knots. The west- east record was that of the SeaCat Hoverspeed Great Britain in 1990, crossing in 79 hours 55 minutes at an average of 36.96 knots (and beating United States easterly voyage by 2 h 45 min, adding 1.37 knots to the average speed).

In 1992 Destriero broke both records, crossing east to west (though by a different route, from Tarifa, Spain, to New York) and two weeks later returning at an average speed of 53.09 knots. This also beat the unqualified trans-Atlantic record set by Gentry Eagle in 1989, which crossed west to east in 62 hours 7 minutes, at an average speed of 47.4 knots.

This record has not so far been broken.
