= MV Primrose =

Belgian freight and passenger ferry

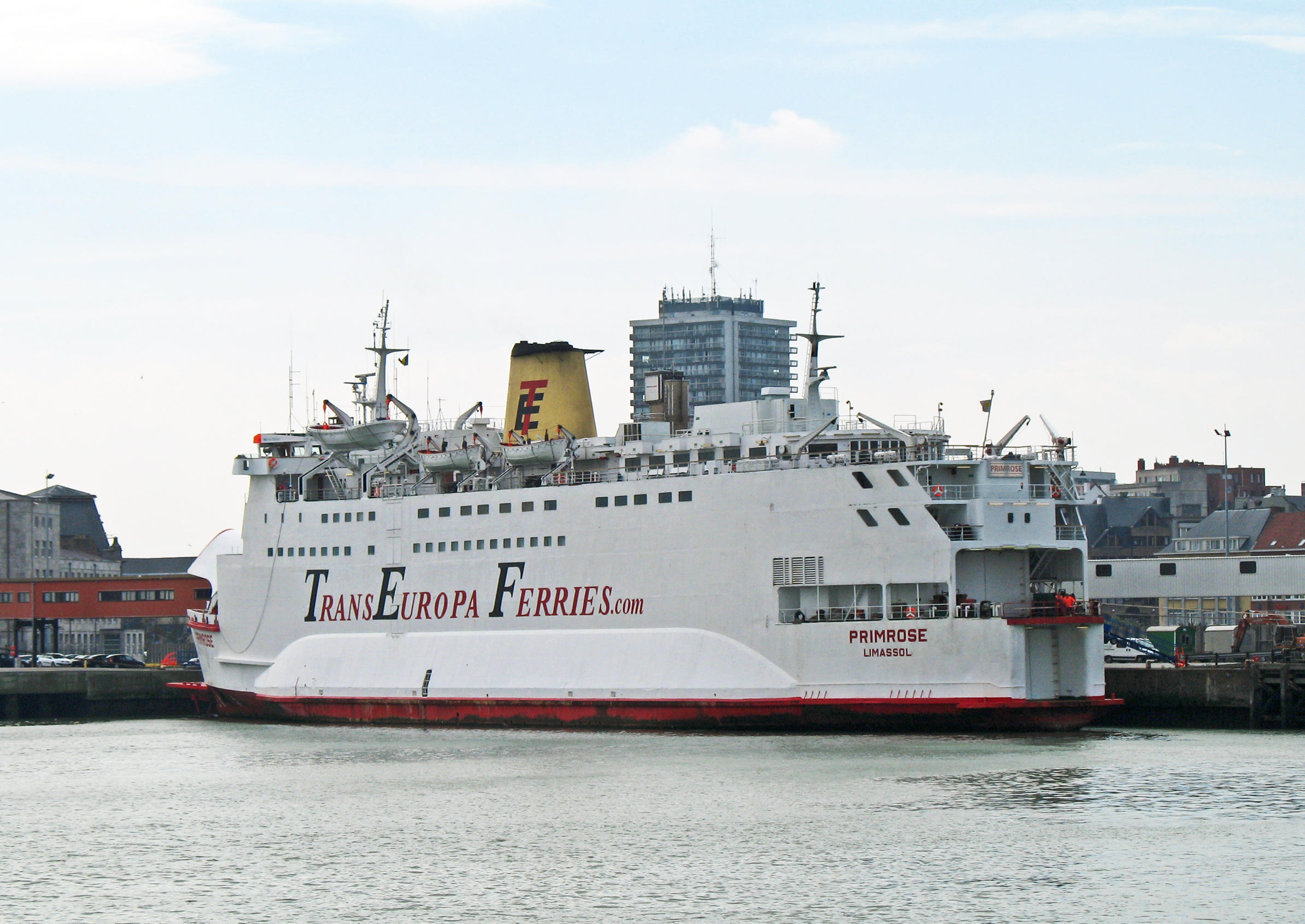
- MV Primrose at Ostend, September 2007

History
- Name: Princesse Marie Christine (1975–1998); Primrose (1998–2011); Elegant I (2011-onwards)
- Owner: Regie voor Maritiem Transport Belgie (1975–1998); Denval Marine Consultants (1998–2010); Blu Navy (2010-onwards)
- Operator: Regie voor Maritiem Transport Belgie (1975–1998); TransEuropa Ferries (1998–2009); Comarit (2009); TransEuropa Ferries (2009–2010); Blu Navy (2010–2011)
- Port of registry: St Kitts Nevis
- Builder: Belliard Hoboken, Belgium
- Yard number: 878
- Laid down: 18 November 1974
- Launched: 8 September 1975
- Completed: 1975
- In service: 1975
- Out of service: 2011
- Identification: IMO number: 7357567
- Fate: Scrapped 2011

General characteristics
- Tonnage: 12,046 gross register tons (GRT)
- Length: 118.4 m (388.5 ft)
- Beam: 23.3 m (76.4 ft)
- Draught: 5.05 m (16.6 ft)
- Propulsion: Two Pielstick 18PC2V400
- Speed: 21 kn (38.9 km/h)

The M/F Primrose was a freight and passenger ferry and operated by Transeuropa Ferries. In 2010 she was sold to Blu Navy; in 2011 she was renamed to M/F Elegant I to make her last journey to India for breaking up.

== History ==
The Primrose was launched by Belliard Hoboken as the Princesse Marie Christine in 1975 for Regie voor Maritiem Transport Belgie on their Ostend to Dover route. In 1987 she was repainted in the colours of Townsend Thoresen following an agreement between them and Regie voor Maritiem Transport. In 1993 Regie voor Maritiem Transport ended their agreement with P&O (who had succeeded Townsend Thoreson) and entered into an agreement with Sally Line, transferring the Princesse Marie Christine to the Ramsgate Ostend route. In 1998 she was bought by Denval Marine Consultants and renamed Primrose. for the Transeuropa Ferries Ostend to Ramsgate route.

In April 2010 sold To FINSEA s.p.a (Italy), unchart To BL di Navigazione s.r.l., install to Piombino – Portoferraio route.

She continued on this route until the spring of 2011 when, under the name of ELEGANT-I she made her last trip to the Indian breakers.

== Sister ships ==
- MV Al Arabia – originally Prinses Maria-Esmeralda, 1975
- MV Eurovoyager – originally Prins Albert, 1978.
