= MV Al Arabia =

Ship built in 1975

History
- Name: MV Al Arabia
- Port of registry: Moroni, Comoros
- Builder: Belliard Hoboken
- Launched: 28 January 1975
- Christened: 1975: Prinses Maria Esmeralda, 1995 + 1998 Wisteria, 1997+2000 Beni Ansar, 2007 Aquaba Express, 2007 Al Arabia
- In service: 1975
- Out of service: 2007
- Identification: IMO number: 7357555
- Fate: Scrapped in India

General characteristics
- Tonnage: 12,046 gross register tons (GRT)
- Length: 118.42 m (388.5 ft); Before enlarging:118.42 m (388.5 ft)
- Beam: 23.32 m (76.5 ft); Before enlarging:19.9 m (65.3 ft)
- Depth: 5.05 m (16.6 ft); Before enlarging:4.52 m (14.8 ft)
- Installed power: 18.200
- Propulsion: 2* Pielstick 18PC2V400
- Speed: 21 kn (38.9 km/h)
- Capacity: 1475/1250 passengers

The MV Al Arabia was a roro-ferry which has seen service on several routes. The ship was built for the Belgium state-owner operator Regie voor Maritiem Transport België as the Prinses Maria Esmeralda. She sailed on the Ostend-Dover route.

Under the name Wisteria she also sailed on routes in the Mediterranean Sea and on the Almeria to Nador line. This 1975 built ship is a sistership of the MV Eurovoyager and MV Primrose.

== History ==
In 1975 the Belliard Shipyard built the ship under dock-number 877. The ship was ordered by the state-owned operator Regie voor Maritiem Transport België. She was christened Prinses Maria Esmeralda. She sailed on the Dover-Ostend route.

In 1995 the ship was sold to Transeuropa Ferries and renamed MV Wisteria to sail on routes in the Mediterranean and was chartered to ferry-operators between Spain and Morocco and Tunisia. The Wisteria was sold to Lignes Maritime du Detroit (Limadet) where she was Renamed "Beni Ansar" she moved permanently to run on the Almeria to Nador route until she was sold for scrapping in 2007 to India

== Sisterships ==
The Prinses Maria Esmeralda was one of three sisterships ordered by RMT. The Prins Albert and the Princesse Marie Christine.
