= Port of Ramsgate =

Coordinates: 51°19′34″N 1°24′57″E

- Interactive map of Port of Ramsgate

Location
- Country: England
- Location: Ramsgate, Kent

Details
- Opened: 1850
- Operated by: Thanet District Council
- Owned by: Thanet District Council
- Land area: 32 acres (130,000 m^{2})
- No. of berths: 3
- Berths in marina: 700

Statistics
- Annual cargo tonnage: 1.59m tonnes (2009)
- Passenger traffic: 2,000,000
- Website www.portoframsgate.co.uk

The Port of Ramsgate (also known as Port Ramsgate, Ramsgate Harbour, and Royal Harbour, Ramsgate) is a harbour situated in Ramsgate, south-east England, serving cross-Channel freight traffic and smaller working and pleasure craft. It is owned and operated by Thanet District Council.

== History ==
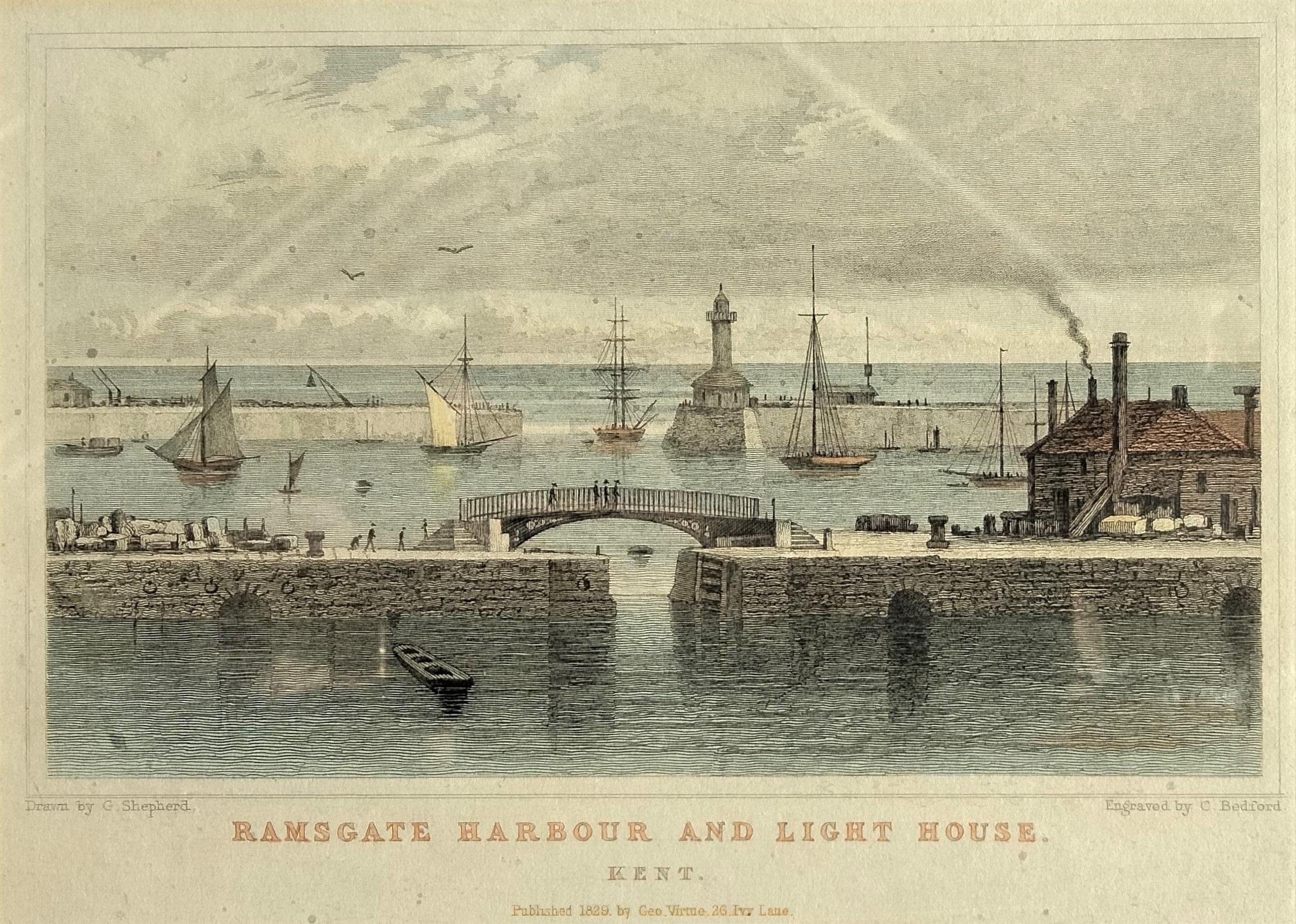
Ramsgate Harbour in 1829

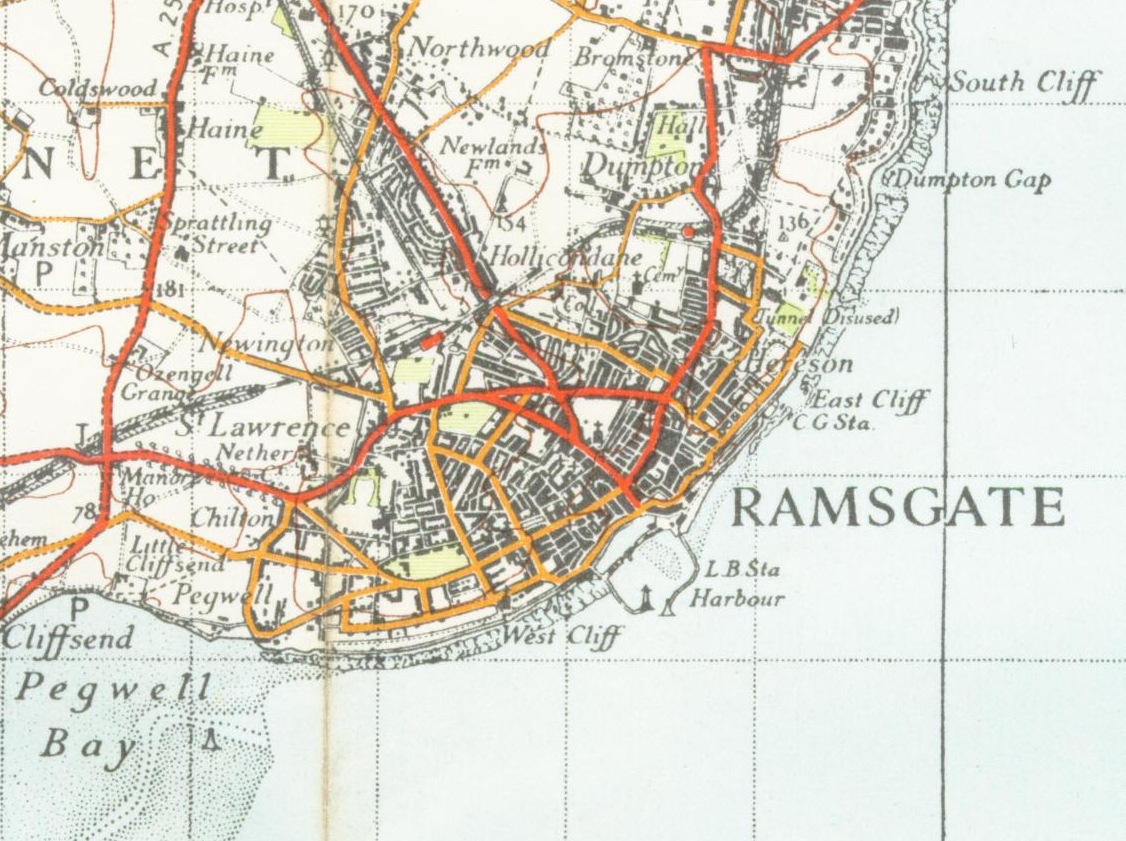
A map of Ramsgate from 1945

The construction of Ramsgate Harbour began in 1749, and was completed in about 1850. The two most influential architects of the harbour were father and son John Shaw and John Shaw Jr, who designed the clock house, the obelisk, the lighthouse and the Jacob's Ladder steps.

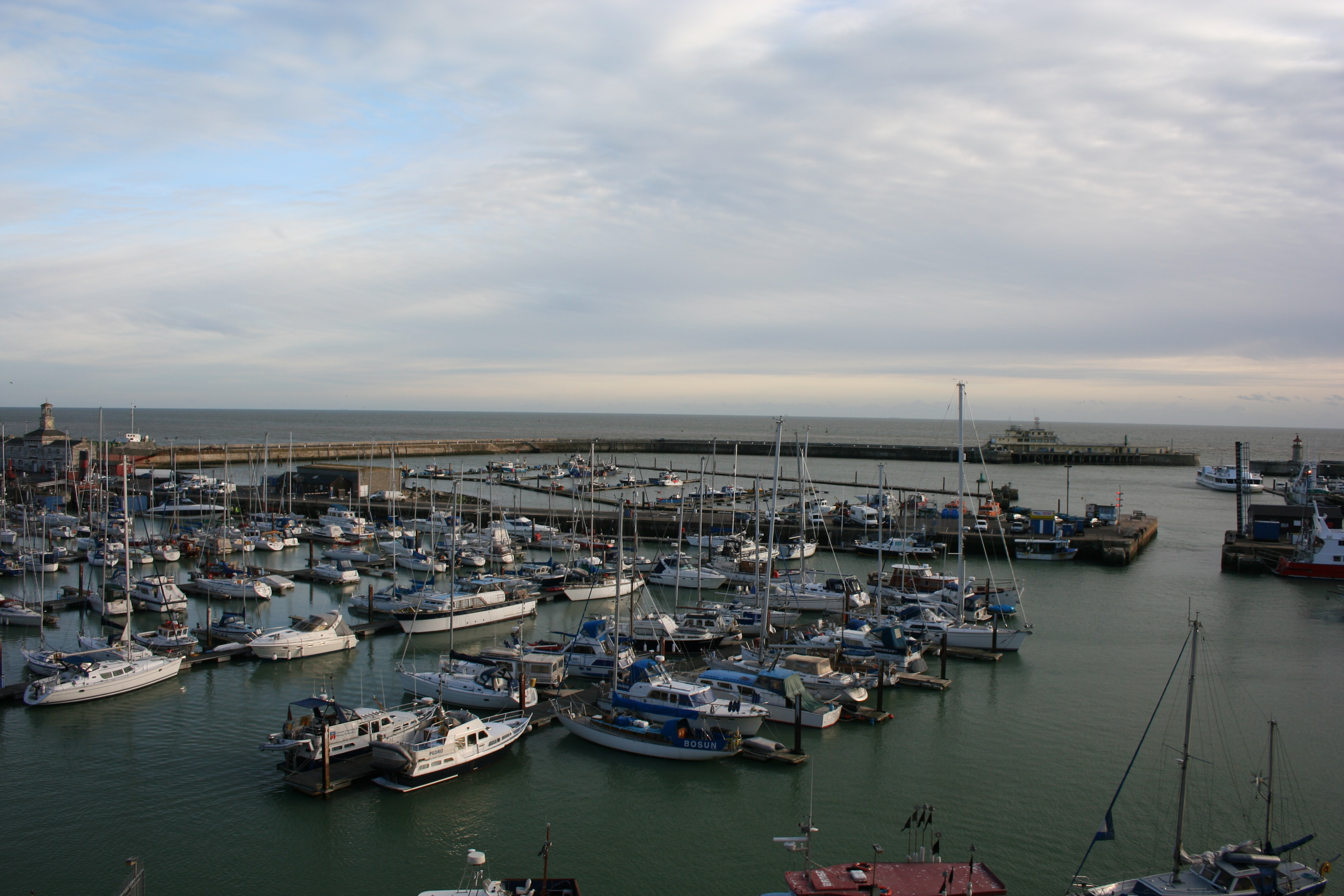
View of the inner and outer marina from land, at high tide

The harbour has the unique distinction of being the only harbour in the United Kingdom awarded the right to call itself a Royal Harbour. This was bestowed by King George IV after he was taken by the hospitality shown by the people of Ramsgate when he used the harbour to depart and return with the Royal Yacht Squadron in 1821. In 2024 the harbour was designated a Heritage Harbour.

Because of its proximity to mainland Europe, Ramsgate was a chief embarkation point both during the Napoleonic Wars and for the Dunkirk evacuation in 1940.

== Passenger and freight services ==
Helped by its position 35 miles (56 km) from the French coast, the port provided cross-Channel crossings for many years, with Ramsgate Port having its own access tunnel avoiding town centre congestion.

=== Ferries ===
Whilst historically, the port of Ramsgate had boasted a ferry service to France, these had ceased in 1966. In December 1979 a new ferry route between Dunkerque and Ramsgate was announced. This was to be operated by Dunkerque Ramsgate Ferries (DRF) and was run by Olau Line-founder; Ole Lauritzen. The service had originally been expected to utilise the Olau Line vessel; Olau Kent (for which the new facilities at Ramsgate had been designed), but actually was served by the much older ship Nuits St Georges, which commenced sailings in May 1980.

By the beginning of September 1980 a series of problems and the arrest of Nuits St Georges saw the collapse of DRF, which left the terminal at Ramsgate having to be mothballed.

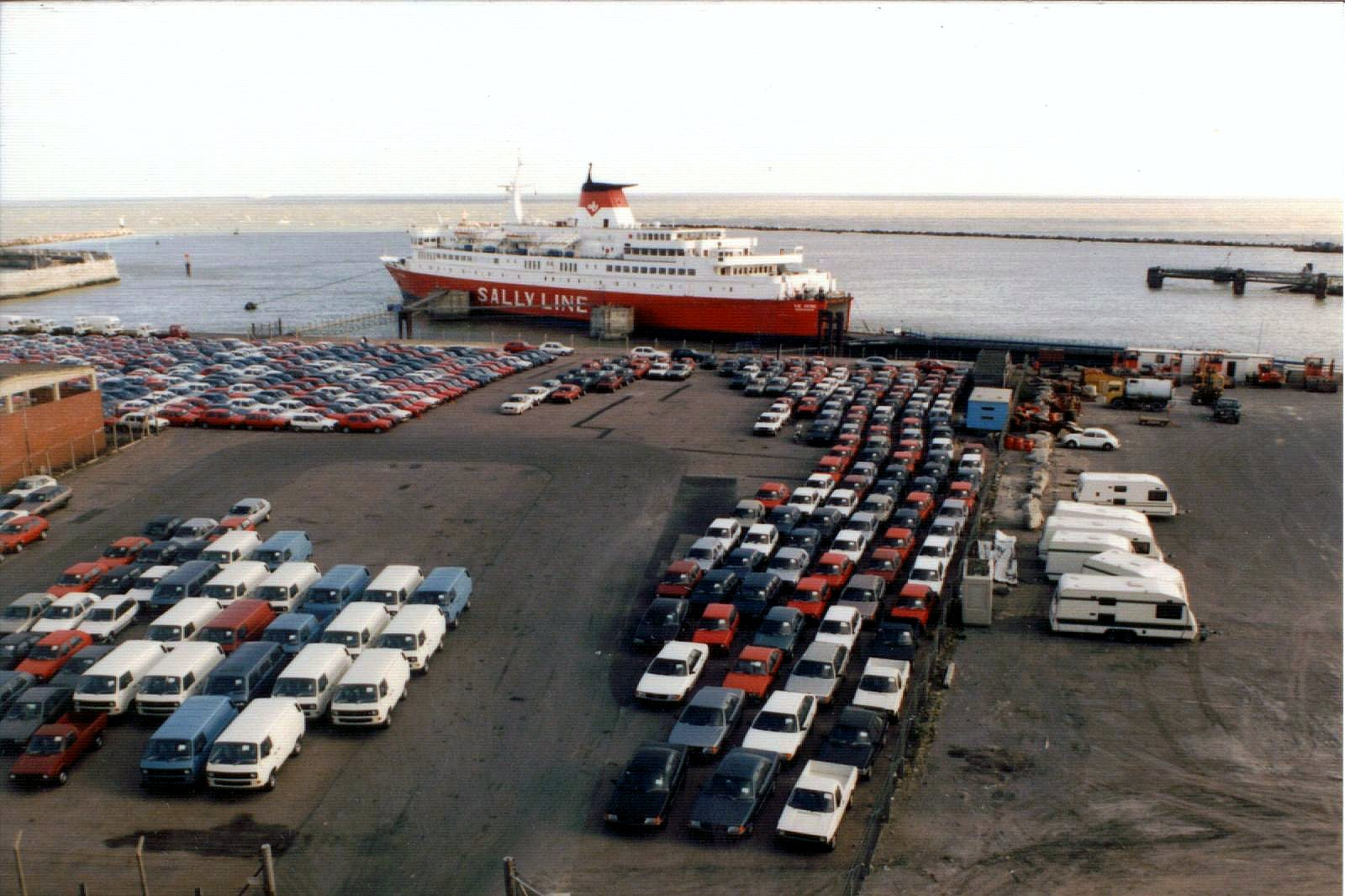
A Sally Line ferry at Ramsgate Harbour

Later in 1980, discussions commenced about a replacement service for Dunkerque Ramsgate Ferries, capitalising on the £6.25 million invested by Thanet District Council to create the ferry facilities at Ramsgate. These discussions involved the Finnish shipping company Rederi Ab Sally, who created the Sally Ferries service which commenced sailings to Dunkerque in 1981.

Sally Line were not only the ferry operator on the route, but also operated the Port of Ramsgate under a 90-year agreement with Thanet District Council. By 1983 it became clear that the exposed nature of the port needed addressing, and a breakwater scheme was instituted to provide protection to the port and allowing fewer cancelled sailings due to poor weather. As a result of this the Sally Line operations were reorganised with a separate company being established; Port Ramsgate Ltd to assist with the development of Ramsgate as a port for other operators. This reorganisation paid off in October 1983 when an agreement was reached for Schiaffino Line to commence cargo operations from Ramsgate to Ostend, and a second berth was completed (along with 25,000 sqm of land reclamation) in February 1984 which resulted in Schiaffino moving all their services to Ramsgate from Dover. Construction of the breakwater commenced in July 1984, completing in November of that year and was underaken by John Howard & Company plc. A further expansion was announced in 1985 for a third linkspan, a new second breakwater and the strengthening, joining and widening of the existing breakwaters; with construction again to be undertaken by John Howard & Company. This was completed in 1986, although delays over a proposed further expansion of the port to include a rail link forced John Howard & Company into receivership shortly before completion of the works, started in 1985.

After many years of losses and an acrimonious withdrawal in 1985 from the Sealink consortium, the state owned Belgian company Regie voor Maritiem Transport (RMT) opened discussions with Sally Line in 1986 about moving their services (now operated in a pooling agreement with Townsend Thoresen to Ramsgate). This would require routing rail traffic to Port of Ramsgate, initially via Ramsgate railway station, but with an envisaged branch line being built to serve the port directly. This did not come to pass but this would not be the last word in a relationship between RMT and Sally.

Negotiations between Sally Line and Thanet District Council in 1986 extended the lease of the port to 125 years. With further security of tenure, the idea of a rail link to Ramsgate persisted and during 1986/1987 serious discussions took place between Sally/Port Ramsgate, British Railways Board, SNCF and SNCB about moving train ferry services away from a Sealink British Ferries controlled berth at Dover Western Docks to Ramsgate. Ultimately a decision by the Department of the Environment to establish a public enquiry would have delayed the project to such an extent that discussions ceased.

By 1990, it was claimed that Ramsgate was the fastest growing port in Britain. Further expansion of the port saw the introduction of freight services by the Anglo Dutch Ferry Line to complement the existing services by Sally Line and Schiaffino Line (although they would merge by the end of the year).

Regie voor Maritiem Transport (RMT), the Belgian-government owned former member of the Sealink consortium until 1985, announced in 1993 that having operated in conjunction with European Ferries under the Townsend Thoresen and P&O European Ferries branding (1985–1990), and then independently as Oostende Lines, they would enter a new pooling agreement with Sally Line from January 1994. This agreement saw their conventional ferry and Boeing Jetfoil services move their UK port from Dover to Ramsgate, ending the link between Dover and Belgium after over 100 years. Services commenced on 1 January as planned, however further dredging work delayed the introduction of the Prins Filip until the end of the month. The shallow depth of Ramsgate would see a continual risk of grounding at low water during her years operating from the port. RMT's fast ferry services recommenced in February 1994 after the arrival of the floating jetfoil terminal (converted from the former RMT Ferry Reine Astrid in 1983) from Dover.

A further request for better access to the port was turned down by the Department of Transport in the Summer of 1995, when they rejected a £21 million scheme to build a relief road into the harbour area.

In September 1996, after a reported nine months of discussions, and the announcement that RMT services were to cease in 1997; Sally Line announced a new joint venture with Holyman to be known as Holyman Sally Ferries. The joint venture, commencing in March 1997, was to deploy two of Holyman's 81-metre catamarans on the route to Belgium, and was two-thirds owned by Holyman and one-third owned by the Sally parent company, by now; Silja Line. Sally's freight operations which operated under the name of Sally Freight remained separate from the joint venture with Holyman and the traditional Sally route between Ramsgate and Dunkerque closed in April 1997, being replaced with a fast service which closed in October the same year. RMT's former floating jetfoil terminal was removed from Ramsgate for scrapping in Spain, in early April 1997.

Throughout the 1990s, poor access to the Port of Ramsgate was a continual problem and with no progress being made on a proposed link road despite three public enquiries, this became a particular bone of contention between Sally and government at local and national levels. The link road would eventually open in 2000.

The Holyman Sally venture was not financially viable and Holyman became partners with Hoverspeed and moved the service to Dover in March 1998 as Holyman Hoverspeed Ltd. Silja Line's rumoured plans to sell their UK operations came to light around the same time as the cessation of the Holyman joint venture and Sally Line's passenger operations were restructured and marketed as Sally Direct from May 1998, in what would prove to be a last ditch attempt to save the company. Ultimately the end came at midnight on 20 November 1998 at which point operations of Sally Direct and Port Ramsgate ceased, and the port at Ramsgate returned to Thanet District Council.

Between 21 November 1998 and April 2013 a predominantly freight service was provided to Ostend by TransEuropa Ferries. Passenger services were only available on certain crossings, and then only with vehicles.

The long-awaited £30 million Harbour Approach Road was finally completed and opened on 30 June 2000.

=== Hovercraft ===
Hoverlloyd ran a crossing from Ramsgate Harbour to Calais from 6 April 1966 using small, passenger-only SR.N6 hovercraft. When the much larger SR.N4 craft, capable of carrying 30 vehicles and 254 passengers, were delivered in 1969, Hoverlloyd moved operations to the purpose-built Ramsgate Hoverport in Pegwell Bay, near Ramsgate, which closed in 1987.

=== Recent years ===
Since 2013, there have been no ferry services from Ramsgate despite several suggestions of a new service by Euroferries over the years.

Between 2012–13 and 2014–15, the port recorded a loss of £2.7 million, and it was suggested it should be closed. In 2016, Gefco commenced using the port to import and store cars prior to onward distribution.

The port however continued to make losses, with a further loss of £2.5 million in the year 2018–19, and only limited activity in the commercial port. In 2019, Seaborne Freight was awarded a £13.8m freight contract to Ostend which could be used in the event of a no deal Brexit, but this was ruled out as impractical.

During 2024 a tender process was run to secure a new operator for the Port, using £7.63m of Levelling Up funds for the infrastructure. During the tender process it was revealed that discussions had taken place with an unnamed potential operator. This was later revealed to be the Dover Harbour Board, but they ultimately decided not to submit a tender (leading to the abandonment of the process in January 2025) with Dover Chief Executive; Doug Bannister, saying in a letter that:

"In the end, we determined that we could not submit a tender for the parameters contained in that process. In short, the capital investment (net of the available LUF grant) that we felt was required compared (to the) immediately available market held more risk than we could accept at that point... ...it is regrettable, as the fundamental advantages of a re-opened Ramsgate remain. However, we simply cannot progress within the timescales at this time."

== Royal Harbour Marina ==
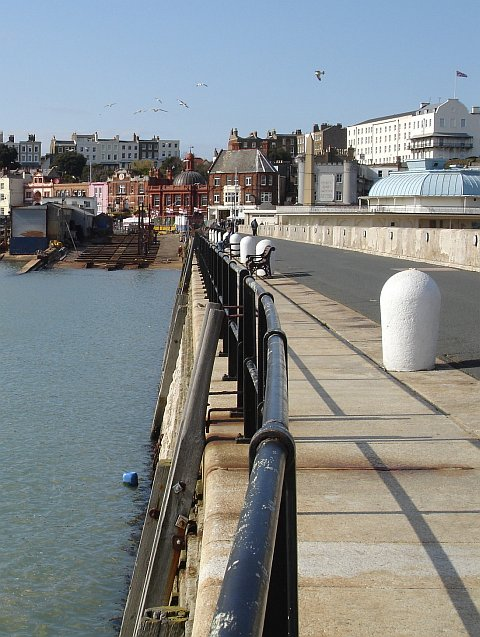
The East harbour arm of the main Royal Harbour

The Royal Harbour has a large marina, primarily based in the inner pool of the original harbour, with water levels controlled by lock gates containing 700 berths, although a number of other berths are also available in the outer harbour, and so can be accessed around the clock, rather than just either side of high tide when the gates open.

The marina has a number of facilities for sailors, including refuelling, utility hook-ups and amenity blocks.

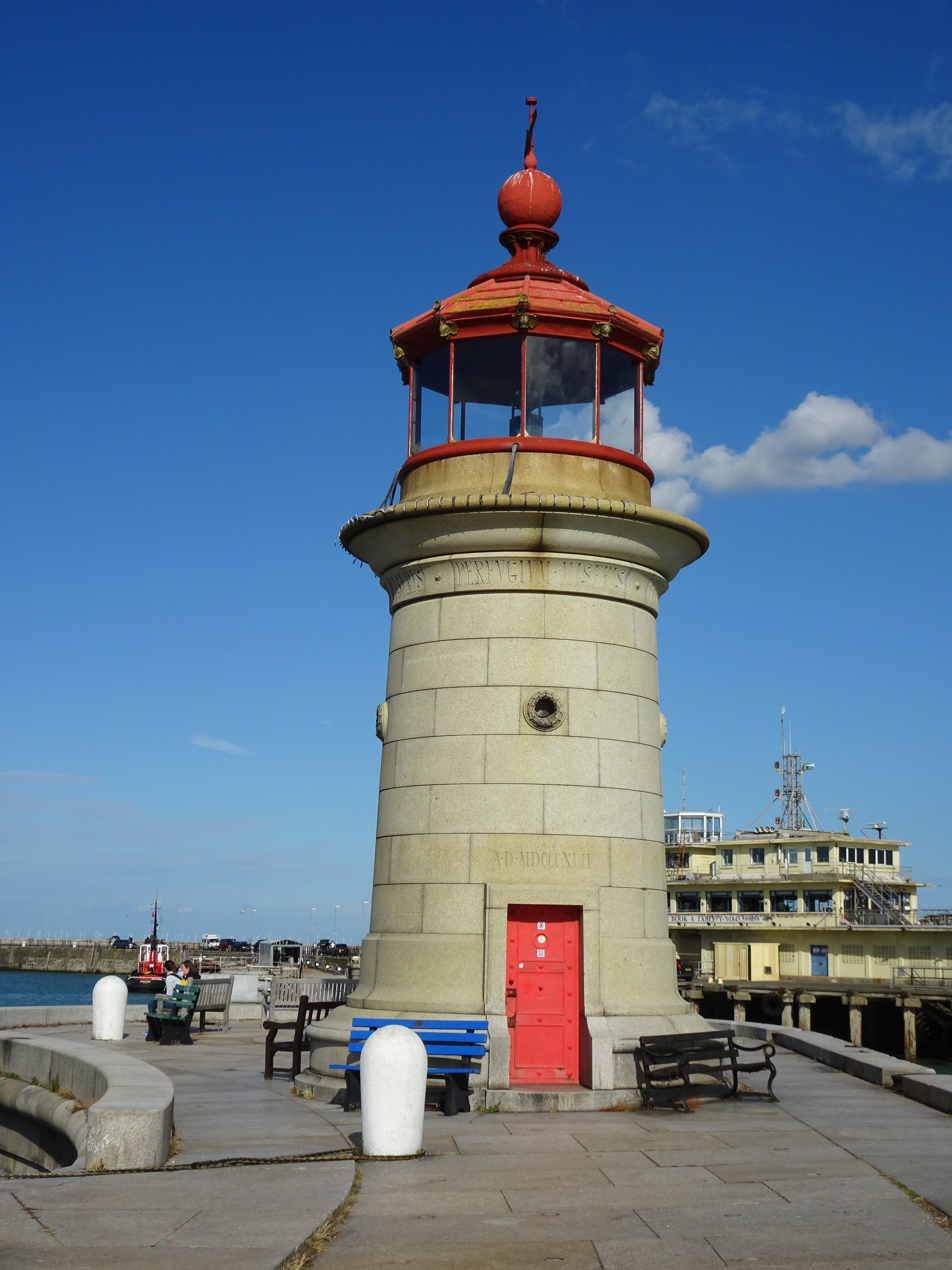
The lighthouse on the West harbour arm, designed by John Shaw Jr.

The lighthouse situated on the West harbour arm was built in 1842 and is 11m high; it is a Grade II listed building. The lighthouse is active and emits a continuous red light; (originally the light varied from red to green depending on the height of the tide at the harbour entrance). It replaced an earlier lighthouse by Benjamin Dean Wyatt, which had been poorly positioned and suffered damage from passing ships. Now powered by electricity, originally it was lit by an oil lamp, with a fourth-order Fresnel lens. Carved in the stonework of the lighthouse are the words 'PERFUGIAM MISERIS', which are translated as 'refuge for those in need'.

== Lifeboat station ==
A lifeboat station was first established at Ramsgate Harbour in 1802 by the trustees of the harbour, predating the formation of any national lifeboat organisation by more than 20 years. The original was built by lifeboat pioneer Henry Greathead, in the same year that he was recognised by parliament for the lifeboat being "deemed a fit subject for national munificence".

After a lapse in service between 1824 and 1851 a station was re-established by the trustees, with the lifeboat named in honour of the lifeboat sponsor, the Duke of Northumberland. The new and prized boat had been built in accordance with the plans of a model that had been the prize-winner in the 1851 national competition for the best design for such a craft.

In 1859 Jerimiah Walker (having previously distinguished himself by his successful rescue of the master and crew of the Northern Belle), as a seaman on the lugger Petrel, assisted in the rescue of the crew of the Spanish vessel Julia, which had become stranded off Ramsgate. For this assistance he was awarded a medal struck on the authority of Queen Isabella II of Spain.

On New Year's Day 1861 an event at sea of considerable loss of life occurred with the wreck of the Guttenburg. Then, as now, the most hazardous area around the Kent coastline for any navigator was the Goodwin Sands.

In 1865, the lifeboat was taken over by the Board of Trade and the Royal National Lifeboat Institution, and was taken over completely by the RNLI, which runs the service to this day. The current lifeboat station, on the harbour wall between the inner and outer pools of the main harbour, opened in 1998 and services both an onshore lifeboat, the 'Bob Turnbull' and offshore lifeboat, the 'RNLB Esme Anderson'.

== Offshore wind farm ==
The Thanet Offshore Wind Project required the construction of a 280m quay for the assembly of wind turbines. Turbines for the London Array are maintained from an operations and maintenance base at the port.

== Walkway collapse ==
On 14 September 1994 there was a failure of a ship-to-shore structure for the transfer of foot passengers onto ferries. While RMT's Prins Filip was docked and loading vehicles and passengers, and getting readied for the voyage to Ostend in Belgium, the walkway collapsed, causing the deaths of six people and seriously injuring seven more. The investigation into the accident revealed that the same basic miscalculation had been made by both the designer (Swedish firm FKAB, a subsidiary of the Mattson Group) and certifying organisation Lloyd's Register. The parties involved, including the client, Port Ramsgate, were prosecuted and fined a total of £1.7m, which at the time was the largest fine in the United Kingdom for a breach of health and safety laws. The Swedish firms refused to pay the £1m fine and as a result pan-European law enforcement was changed in 2005.

== In popular culture ==
Films including Gypo (2005), Ruby Blue (2008), Will (2011), The Flood (2019), Shiddat and Jagame Thandhiram (both 2021), and My Fault: London (2025) have used the port for filming.

Television shows filmed at the port include: Eastenders, Big Bad World, Not Going Out, The Bastard Son & The Devil Himself, Liaison, and Say Nothing.

== See also ==
- Channel Ports
- Ramsgate Maritime Museum
- The Royal Harbour Academy
