= MV Lucky Star (1976) =

Ferry built in 1976

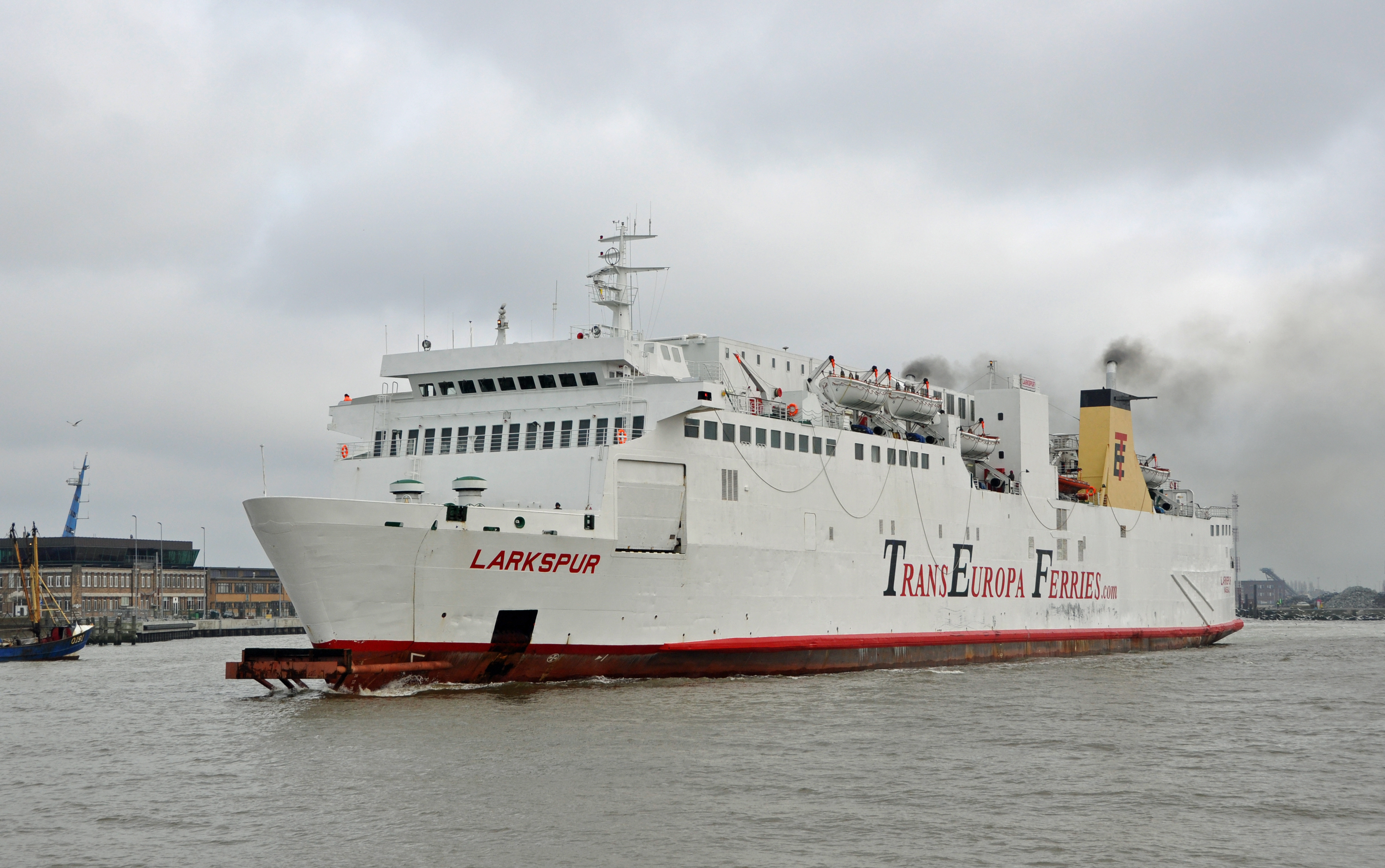
- Larkspur departing Ostend for Ramsgate

History
- Name: Lucky Star (2014–2016); Larks (2014); Larkspur (1999–2014); Eurotraveller (1997–1999); Sally Sky (1988–1997); Viking 2 (1986–1988); Gedser (1976–1986)
- Owner: Oilchart (2013-2016); Forsythia Maritime Co Ltd (1999–2013); Sally Line Lrd (1999); Johnson Line AB (1988–1999); Thorsviks Rederi A/S (1986–1988); Gedser-Travemunde ruten A/S (1976–1986)
- Operator: Egnatia Seaways (2014); Transeuropa Ferries (1999–2013); Sally Direct (1997–1999); Sally Line (1986–1997); GT Linien (1976–1986)
- Port of registry: 1976–1986: Gedser, (Denmark); 1986–2016: Nassau, (The Bahamas)
- Builder: Schichau Unterweser AG, Germany
- Yard number: 2269
- Launched: 23 August 1976
- Completed: 1976
- Maiden voyage: 1976
- In service: 1976
- Out of service: 2016
- Identification: IMO number: 7500451
- Fate: Scrapped in Aliağa, Turkey, 2016

General characteristics
- Tonnage: 14,300 GRT
- Length: 143.84 m (471 ft 11 in)
- Beam: 20.5 m (67 ft 3 in)
- Draught: 5.81 m (19 ft 1 in)
- Installed power: 2 × Stork-Werkspoor 9TM410 diesel engines
- Propulsion: 2 × controllable pitch propellers
- Speed: 18.5 knots (34.3 km/h; 21.3 mph)

MV Lucky Star was a ferry previously operated by TransEuropa Ferries (TEF) between 1999 and April 2013 as MV Larkspur. After TEF went bankrupt in April 2013 the ship was taken to Ostend, Belgium where she was laid up. She was sold in December 2013 to an unknown buyer and then sold again to Oilchart, a local bunkering company, for more than E400K. Her name was then shortened to Larks. She briefly served with the Greek ferry operator Egnatia Seaways but after financial issue from within Egnatia she was laid up and was renamed Lucky Star on 1 September 2014 and was registered to Velenio Shipping Co Ltd, Athens, Greece at the same time of her renaming.

== History ==
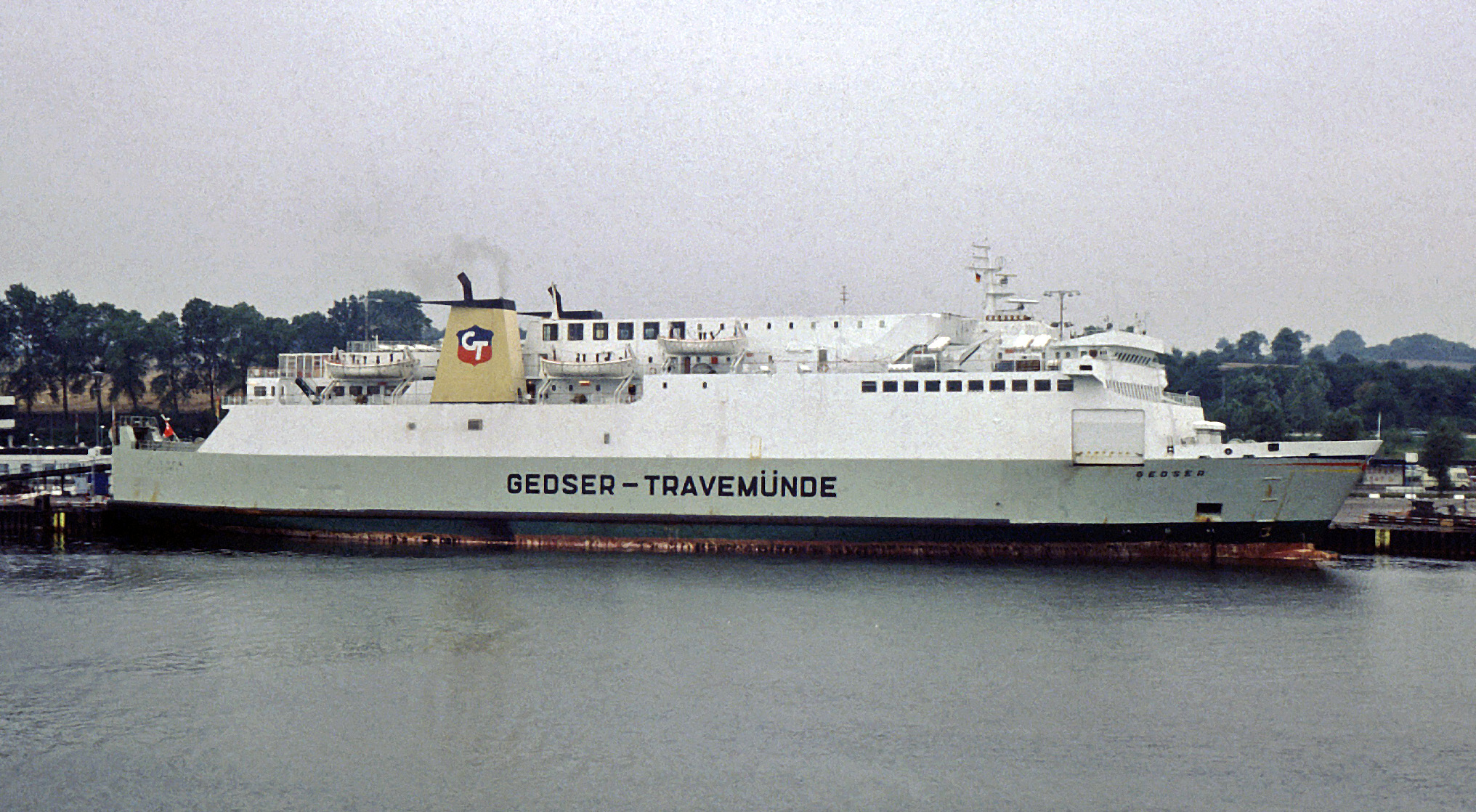
Gedser at Travemünde in August 1982.

Launched as Gedser she served between Gedser, Denmark and Travemünde, West Germany, from 1976 until 1986 when she was acquired by Sally Line and she was renamed Viking 2. She operated for Sally Line between Ramsgate, United Kingdom, and Dunkirk, France, and in 1988 she was renamed Sally Sky. In 1997 the vessel was renamed Eurotraveller when she entered service for Sally Direct.

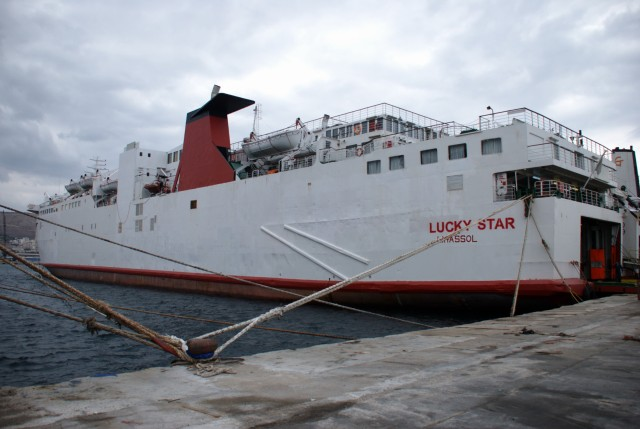
Lucky Star laid up at Drapetsona, Greece between 2014 and 2016.

In 1999 she was acquired by TransEuropa Ferries and operated between Ramsgate and Ostend, Belgium, as Larkspur, later being joined by Gardenia and Begonia in 2002, followed by Ostend Spirit (1) in 2010 and Ostend Spirit (2) in 2013. Larkspur was laid up in 2013 with what was believed to be engine problems but was to remain laid up after TransEuropa filed for bankruptcy in April 2013. In December 2013 Larkspur was put up for sale in a public auction for E400k, but was then sold to Oilchart, a local bunkering company for more than E400K and remained at Ostend. The vessel was renamed in 2014 to just simply Larks.

In September 2016 she was sold to Turkey for scrap.
