= Inishmore (disambiguation) =

Inishmore may refer to:

- Inishmore, in the Aran Islands in County Galway, Ireland
- Inishmore (album), a 1997 album by Riot
- MV Isle of Inishmore, a ferry
- Inishmore, an island in Lough Erne, Ireland
- Inishmore, or Deer Island, an island in County Clare, Ireland
