= Port of Ostend =

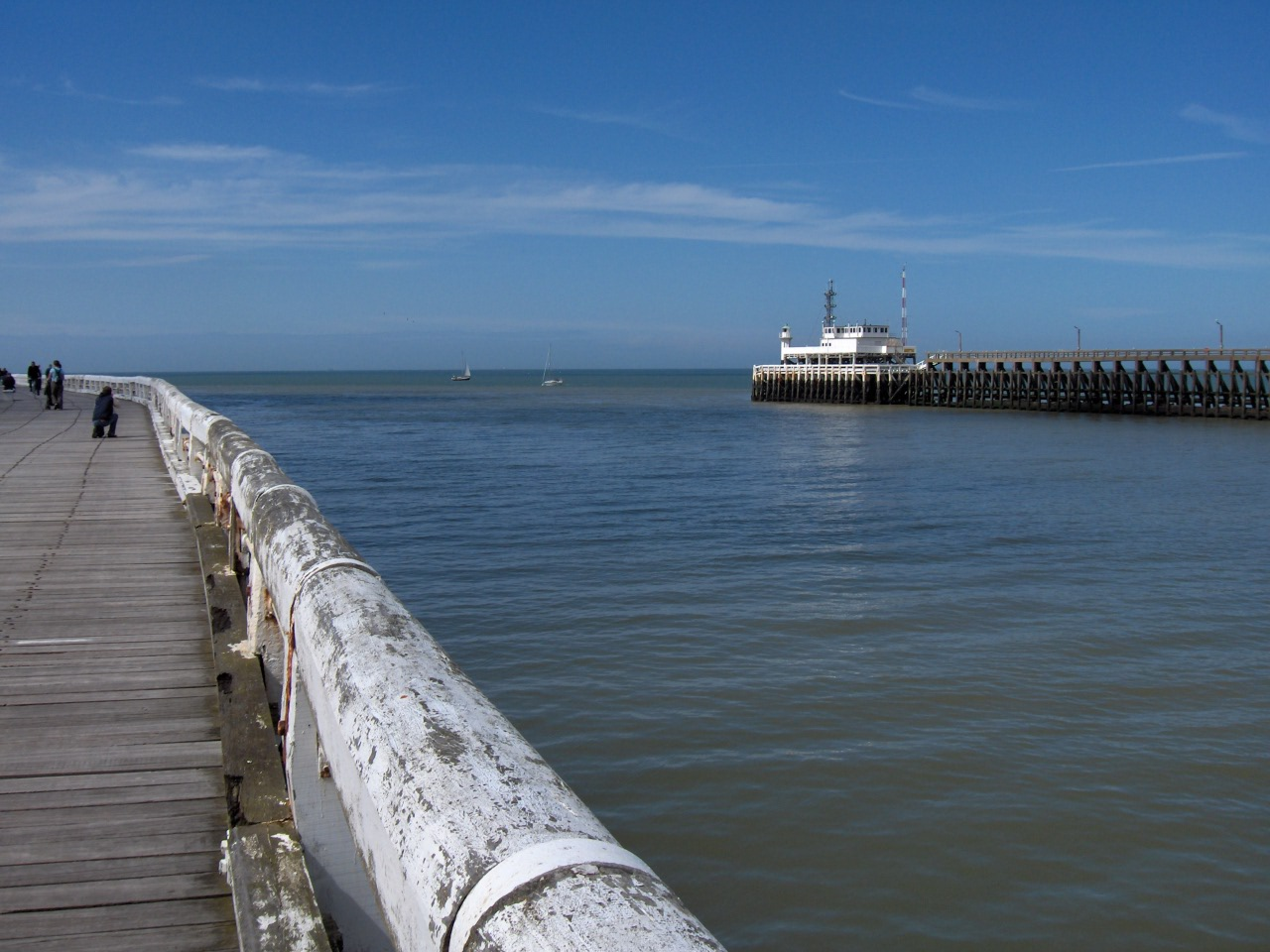
- Entrance to the Port of Ostend
- Interactive map of Port of Ostend

Location
- Country: Belgium
- Location: Ostend, Flanders
- Coordinates: 51°13′28″N 2°54′35″E
- UN/LOCODE: BEOST

Details
- Opened: 1584
- Type of harbour: coastal harbour
- No. of berths: 52 (including canal berths)
- Draft depth: 8.0 m.

Statistics
- Website; Official website

The Port of Ostend (Dutch: Oostende) is situated in Ostend, West Flanders in the Flemish Region of Belgium. The port services freight transport between Ostend and Ramsgate, Ipswich and North Killingholme Haven.

Passenger transport between Ostend and Ramsgate was provided by Transeuropa Ferries from 1998 to 2013.

== History ==
As part of the city of Ostend the port was founded in 1584 when the sand dunes were pushed back to create the beginnings of the modern basin.

Twenty years later Ostend had been transformed from a sleepy fishing village into a fortified, moated and important Flemish port.

After the Siege of Ostend (1601-1604) the port was not rebuilt.

It became a haven for privateers until the eighteenth century. Charles VI briefly granted it a license to trade with the far east as the Oostendsche Companie. This enriched the port and set it up again. During the American Revolution Ostend became a free port. The docks were redeveloped under Dutch rule (1815 - 1830). Ferry services to Dover began in 1846, with Ostend being the hub for the Regie voor Maritiem Transport until 1997.

Again at the end of the 19th century the port was redeveloped to cope with the larger ships of the period. The City Council, unable to raise sufficient funds for the redevelopment handed control and responsibility for the port over to the Belgian government.

The port was damaged in both World Wars (see First and Second Ostend Raid) but soon recovered.
