= Inishmore Island =

Inishmore Island may refer to:

- Inishmore, the largest of the Aran Islands in Galway Bay, Ireland
- Inishmore (or Deer) Island, in County Clare, Ireland
- Isle of Inishmore, list of ships
