= MV Eurovoyager =

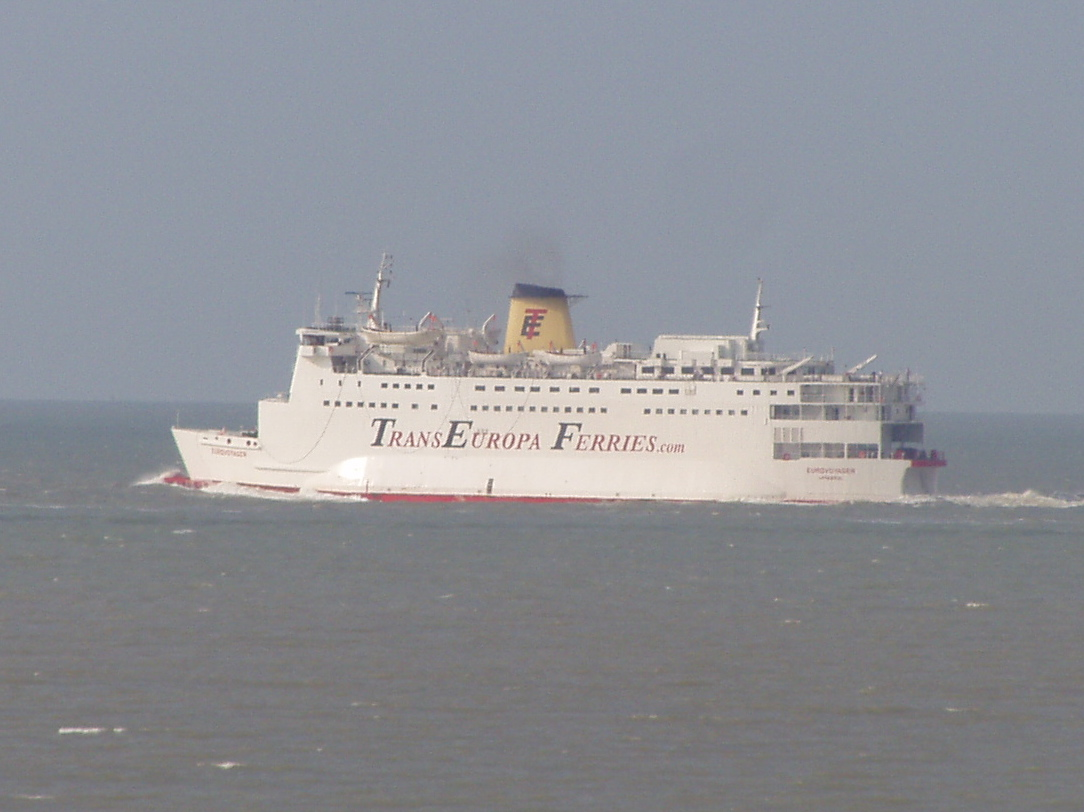
- Eurovoyager leaving Ostend for Ramsgate in 2005.

History
- Name: Prins Albert (1979-1998); Eurovoyager (1998-2012); Voyager (2012)
- Owner: Hawthorn Shipping Co. Ltd.
- Operator: Transeuropa Ferries
- Port of registry: Lome, Togo
- Builder: Belliard Hoboken, Belgium
- Yard number: 887
- Launched: 14 September 1977
- Completed: 1978
- Maiden voyage: 1978
- In service: 1978
- Out of service: 2012
- Identification: Callsign: P3ZK7; IMO number: 7613882
- Fate: Scrapped in 2012

General characteristics
- Tonnage: 12,110 gross register tons (GRT)
- Length: 118.4 m (388.5 ft)
- Beam: 23.32 m (76.5 ft)
- Draught: 5.05 m (16.6 ft)
- Installed power: Two Pielstick 18PC2V400
- Speed: 21 kn (38.9 km/h)

The MV Eurovoyager was a freight and passenger ferry which was operated by Transeuropa Ferries.

== History ==
The Eurovoyager was launched by Belliard Hoboken as the Prins Albert in 1978 for Regie voor Maritiem Transport Belgie on their Ostend to Dover route. In 1994 she was transferred to the Ostend Ramsgate route. In 1998 she was bought by Denval Marine Consultants and renamed Eurovoyager. She was chartered to Sally Line in the same year, but was only used for a few months as in November of the same year she was transferred to Transeuropa Ferries for use on their Ostend Ramsgate route. In July 2009, a Marine Accident Investigation Branch report revealed that Eurovoyager had regularly been operated with her watertight doors open, in breach of maritime regulations. She was scrapped on 27 April 2012 under the name Voyager.

== Sister ships ==
- M/F Primrose - originally Princesse Marie Christine, 1975.
- M/F Al Arabia - originally Princesse Maria-Esmeralda, 1975
