= MS Isle of Innisfree (1991) =

Passenger and car ferry ship

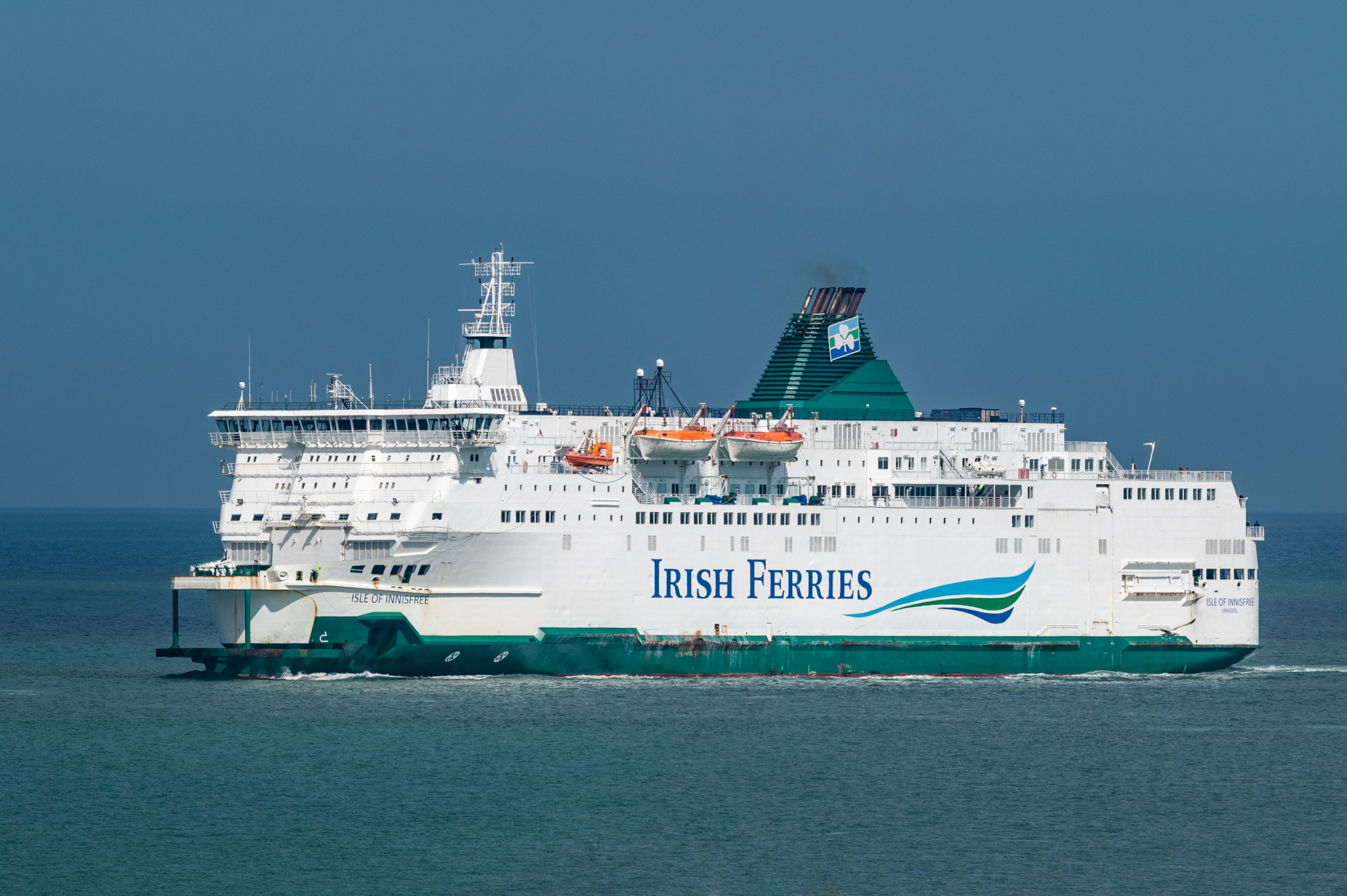
- MS Isle of Innisfree arriving at Dover

History
- Name: 1991-1998: Prins Filip; 1998-1999: Stena Royal; 1999-2002: POSL Aquitaine; 2002-2003: PO Aquitaine; 2003-2005: Pride of Aquitaine; 2005-2010: Norman Spirit; 2010-2011: Ostend Spirit; 2011-2013: Norman Spirit; 2013-2021: Calais Seaways; 2021-present: Isle of Innisfree
- Owner: 1991-1998:Regie voor Maritiem Transport; 1998-2005:Stena RoRo; 2006-2013: LD Lines; 2013-2021: DFDS; 2021 onwards: Irish Ferries
- Operator: Irish Ferries
- Port of registry: 1991-1998:Ostend, Belgium; 1998-2005:Dover, United Kingdom; 2005-2006:Genoa, Italy; 2006-2010: Southampton, United Kingdom; 2010-2011: Ramsgate, United Kingdom; 2011-2021: Le Havre, France; 2021 onwards: Limassol, Cyprus
- Route: Rosslare - Pembroke Dock
- Builder: Boelwerf shipyard, Temse, Belgium
- Cost: $100,000,000
- Yard number: 1534
- Launched: 1 March 1991
- Completed: 1991
- Identification: IMO number: 8908466
- Status: In service

General characteristics
- Tonnage: 28,838 GT
- Displacement: 11,853 Tonnes
- Length: 163.4 m (536.1 ft)
- Beam: 27.6 m (90.6 ft)
- Draft: 6.2 m (20.3 ft)
- Installed power: 4 Sulzer 8ZA S40 diesel engines
- Propulsion: 2 propellers
- Speed: 21 knots (39 km/h; 24 mph)
- Capacity: 1,850 passengers; 700 vehicles; 1,745 lane metres

MS Isle of Innisfree is a passenger and car ferry operated by Irish Ferries between Rosslare and Pembroke Dock. Operated for it first 3 years on the Irish Ferries route between Dover and Calais alongside Isle of Inishmore before being replaced by the newer Oscar Wilde.

Originally built at Boelwerf as the Prins Filip originally sailing between Dover and Ostend, later between Ostend and Ramsgate, she has since 1997 operated for a variety of companies.

== Design ==
The ship is 163.4 m (536.1 ft) long by 27.6 m (90.6 ft) wide with a 6.2 m (20.3 ft) draught, and has some 1,745 lane metres of cargo space for cars, lorries and other vehicles, with three decks accessible to passengers. Uniquely, the ship had a bow door on the starboard (right) for the upper vehicle deck for side loading and unloading in Ostend. Dunkirk West also had this port facility. After 1997 the door was sealed shut.

== History ==
=== RMT ===
The Prins Filip was built for Belgian operator Regie voor Maritiem Transport (RMT) in 1991, entering service in 1992 on its route between Ostend and Dover. In 1994 the RMT entered into a partnership with Sally Line and traded as Oostende Lines. Its UK port was switched to Ramsgate until RMT's operations ceased in 1997.

On 14 September 1994, an accident resulted in 6 deaths when a linkspan collapsed. Foot passengers were boarding the Prins Filip at Ramsgate. All publicity at the time was focused on Sally Line and Thanet District Council, the port owners, and not RMT or the Prins Filip.

=== P&O Stena Line ===
Following a lay-up in Dunkirk, she was acquired by Stena Line in 1998, renamed Stena Royal and initially used on freight services between Dover and Zeebrugge on charter to P&O Stena Line. In 1999, P&O Stena Line decided to extend the charter and transferred the ship to its Dover-Calais route. Stena Royal was extensively refurbished to include the P&O Stena 'Brand World' concept and entered service on the Calais route as the POSL Aquitaine, following the naming pattern for P&O Stena Line vessels.

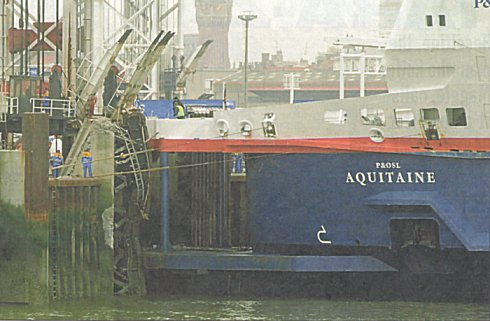
POSL Aquitaine (ex-Prins Filip) fails to stop.

In 2000, the POSL Aquitaine failed to stop whilst berthing at Calais due to a propeller fault. The crash caused many injuries and extensive damage to both the ship and berth.

On 9 October 2002, a crew member died in a chute during a routine raft evacuation trial.

P&O Stena Line was a short-lived venture, ending in 2002 when P&O acquired Stena Line's share in the operation. However, the POSL Aquitaine remained in service, initially under the name PO Aquitaine, then as the Pride of Aquitaine from early 2003 until May 2005 when she was withdrawn following the introduction of two new P&O ferries.

=== LD Lines ===
In October 2005, she began sailing on the route between Portsmouth and Le Havre as Norman Spirit. LD Lines, a French-owned company with existing ferry operations on the Mediterranean Sea, began this service following P&O's withdrawal from it the previous month.

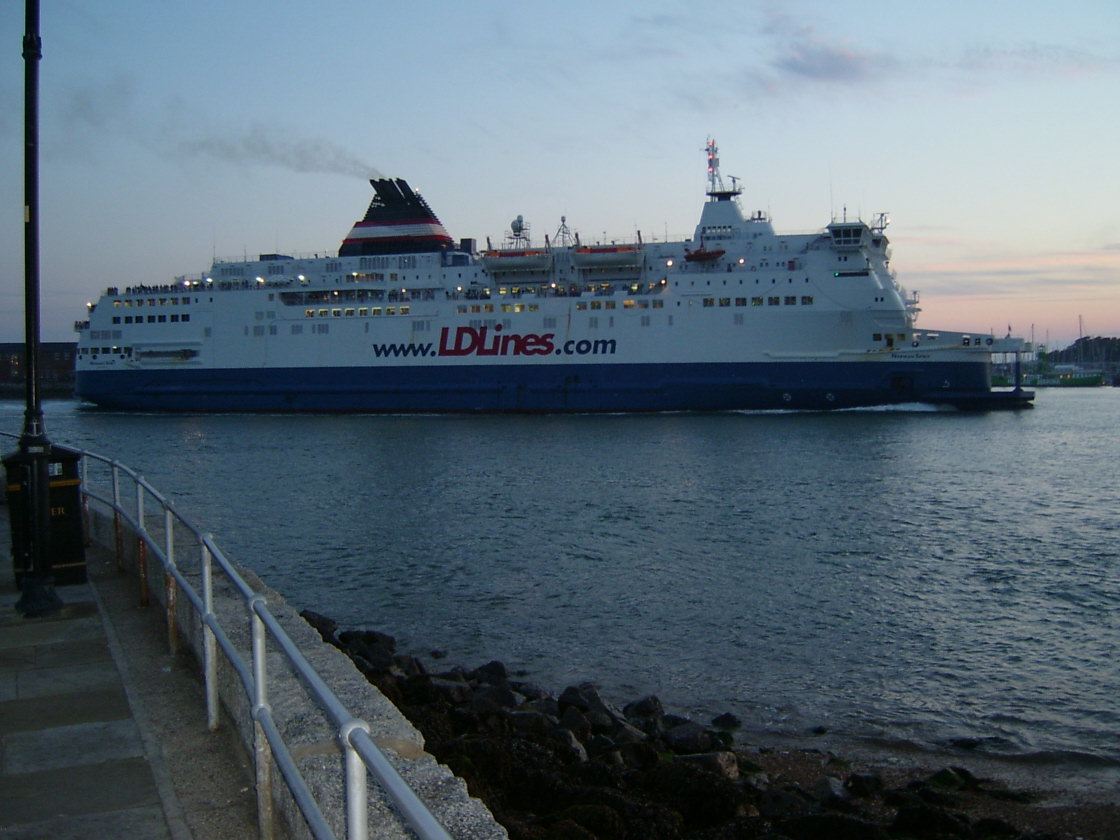
Ostend Spirit as MS Norman Spirit

In June 2006, Norman Spirit was re-flagged to the British registry from the Italian second registry. She was now registered in Southampton rather than Genoa, although when she entered service with LD Lines she was registered in Dover.

In September 2009, LD Lines announced that from November 2009 the vessel would be used on its service between Boulogne-sur-Mer and Dover.

==== TransEuropa Ferries charter ====
In March 2010 the Norman Spirit was chartered by TransEuropa Ferries. In a joint service between TransEuropa Ferries and LD Lines, the ship was renamed Ostende Spirit and began sailing between Ostend and Ramsgate, a route she had previously sailed on between 1994 and 1997.

=== DFDS ===
After changing the vessel name back to Norman Spirit, it was announced on 28 November 2011 that DFDS Seaways would charter the vessel from LD Lines to operate on its Dover-Dunkerque service. This was to help alleviate unexpected traffic pressure on the route caused by the announcement that SeaFrance was going into administration.

At 13:00 on 17 February 2012, the Norman Spirit was 'relaunched' by model and actress Kelly Brook to start a new service for DFDS Seaways and LD Lines, with up to five return crossings per day on the Dover-Calais route.

Following the merger between the two companies in February 2013, and a technical stop for fifteen days in shipyard Gdańsk, Poland, to redevelop the passenger reception, the Norman Spirit made her return to the port of Calais on 17 March 2013, sporting a new name Calais Seaways, and a new colour.

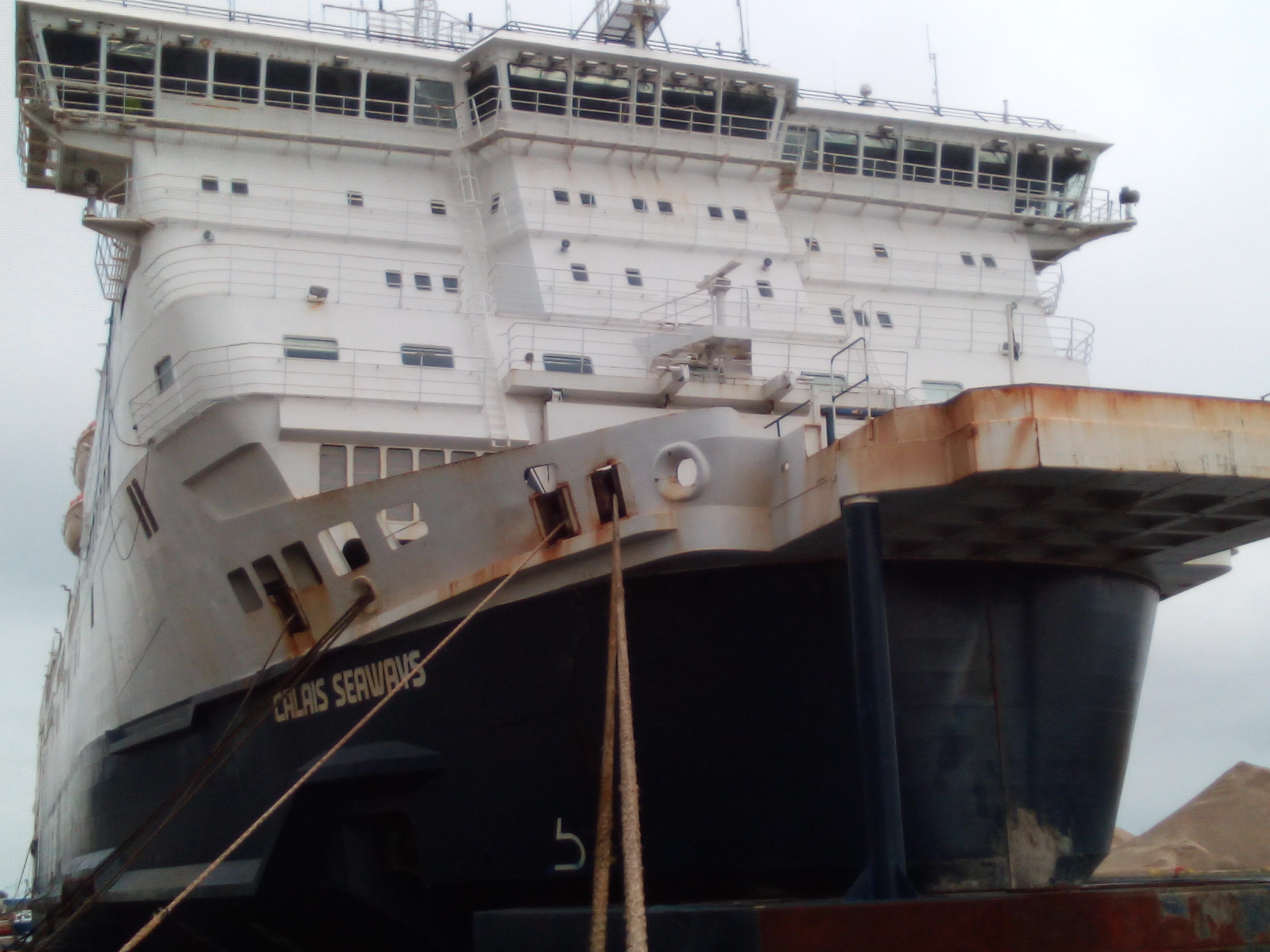
Calais Seaways laid up at Dunkerque East, July/August 2021 after Côte d'Opale replaced her on the Dover-Calais service.

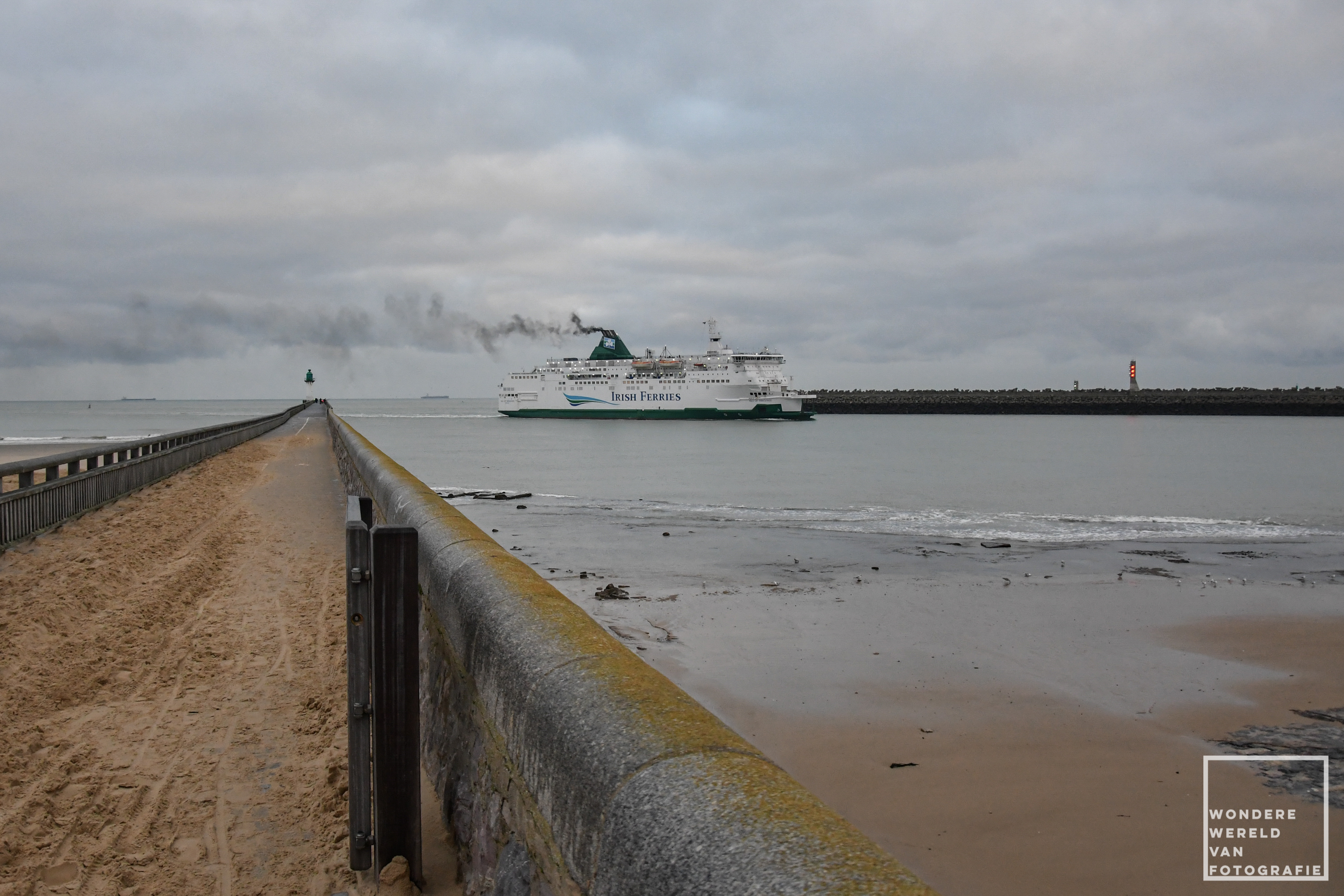
The Isle of Innisfree arrives at Calais on 20 December 2021.

In 2018, DFDS announced an order for an E-Flexer class ferry from Stena RoRo in order to replace Calais Seaways. The new vessel is named Côte D’Opale, or in English, Opal Coast. The vessel was delivered in May 2021, entering service on 4 August 2021 after sea trials in April, and a lengthy delivery voyage from Weihai, China, where she was built.

On the same day as the Côte d'Opale was phased into service, the Calais Seaways was retired from DFDS service. Shortly afterwards she sailed to Dunkerque East, where she was laid up.

=== Irish Ferries ===
Shortly after the Calais Seaways was laid up, speculation and rumours started circulating that the ship was sold to Irish Ferries and was to be renamed Isle of Innisfree. Speculation continued throughout August, September and October and into early November without confirmation. However, the speculation came to a close when on 4 November 2021 Irish Continental Group announced the ship's purchase from DFDS, alongside confirming the ship will be renamed to Isle of Innisfree.

Shortly after the purchase, the ship was reflagged from Le Havre in France to Limassol, Cyprus, in line with the Irish Ferries fleet. On 17 November she was moved into a floating dry dock at Damen Shiprepair Dunkerque for works before entry into service in December 2021, complementing the Isle of Inishmore. The Innisfree then departed Damen Dunkerque on 14 December early in the morning, arriving in Dover after anchoring off Calais and awaiting a harbour pilot just outside of Dover. The ship then started service the next morning for Irish Ferries, with the first commercial passengers sailing on 16 December.

In June 2024, Isle of Innisfree was displaced from the Dover-Calais routing by Oscar Wilde. After being docked at Falmouth for maintenance work, it was redeployed to the Rosslare - Pembroke Dock service, freeing up fleetmate James Joyce to be diagrammed onto other services within the Irish Ferries network.

Fire in the English Channel

On 3 March 2023 a fire broke out in the engine room while the ship was sailing from Dover to Calais with 183 people on board, consisting of 94 passengers and 89 crew members. A French tugboat and three British lifeboats were dispatched to assist. No injuries were reported and the fire was overcome by crew members.
