= MV Star Fighter =

Ship built in 1978

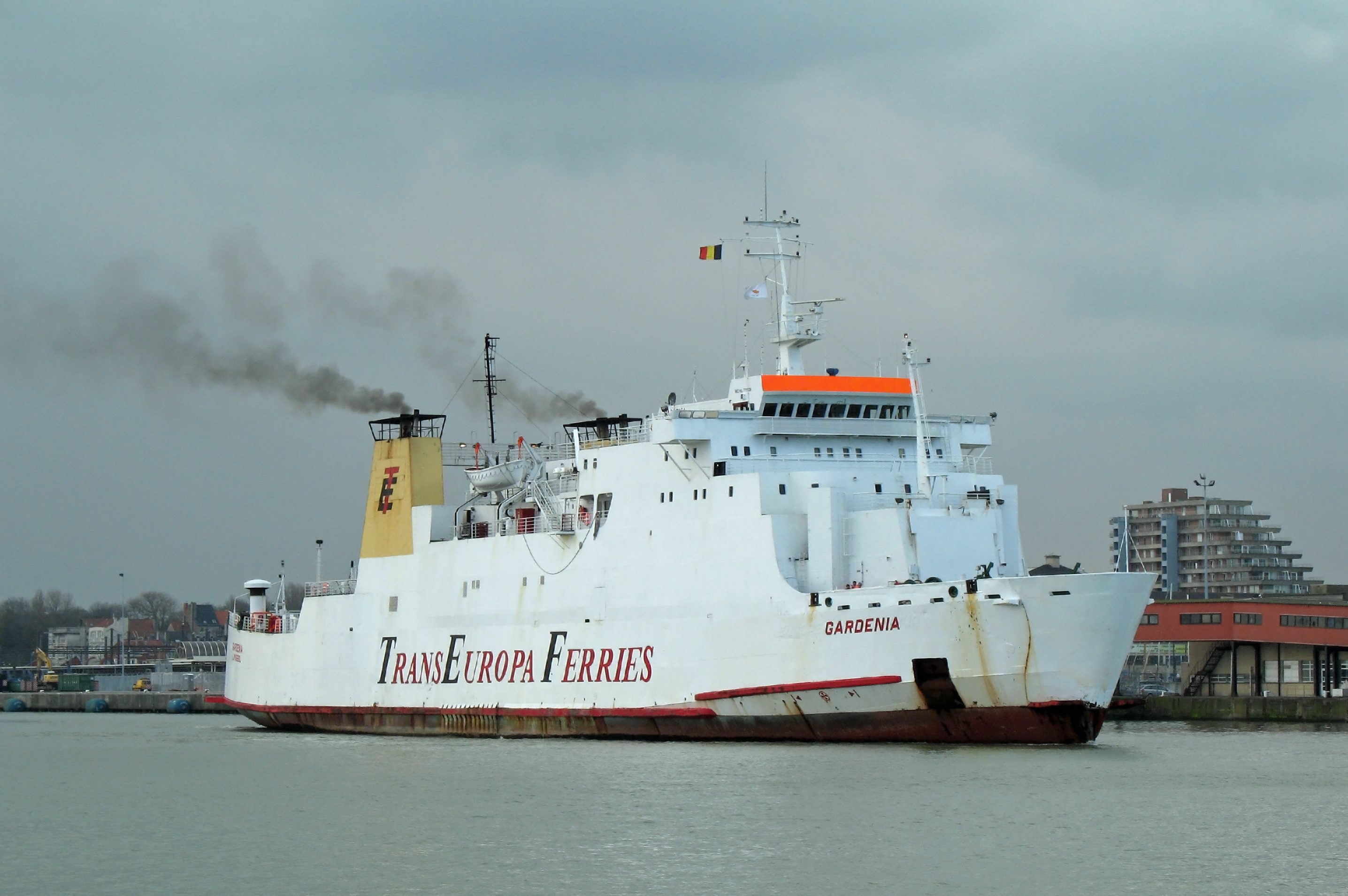
- Transeuropa ferry Gardenia leaving Ostend.

History
- Name: Star Fighter (2014-2016); Ardenia (2014); Gardenia (2002-2014); European Endeavour (1987-2002); European Enterprise (1978-1987)
- Owner: Oilchart (2013-2016); TransEuropa Ferries (2002-2013); Abbey National Leasing (1991-2002); P&O (1987-1991); European Ferries (Townsend Thoresen) (1978-1987)
- Operator: Transeuropa Ferries (2002-2013); P&O Irish Sea (1996-2002); P&O European Ferries (19870-1996); Townsend Thoresen (1978-1987)
- Port of registry: Limassol, Cyprus
- Route: 2002 - 2013: Ramsgate-Ostend
- Builder: Schichau Unterweser AG, Germany
- Yard number: 2275
- Launched: 22 December 1977
- Completed: 1977
- Maiden voyage: 1977
- In service: 1978
- Out of service: April 2013
- Identification: IMO number: 7711139; Callsign P3JY9; MMSI Number: 210981000
- Fate: Scrapped in 2016

General characteristics
- Tonnage: 22,152 GT
- Length: 117.85 m (386.6 ft)
- Beam: 20.27 m (66.5 ft)
- Draught: 5.82 m (19.1 ft)
- Propulsion: Two Stork Werkspoor 9TM410
- Speed: 18.4 kn (34.1 km/h)

MV Star Fighter was a freight ferry that was previously operated by TransEuropa Ferries but was laid up in April 2013 after TEF went bankrupt. She was later sold and renamed Ardenia. In 2014 she was registered to Kosilio Shipping of Limassol, Cyprus and was renamed Star Fighter along with her former fleet mate Larks, which was renamed Lucky Star. She then departed Piraeus for Limassol in early November where she was laid up following her name change. She was scrapped at Alang, India, in December 2016.

== History ==
The ship was launched for Townsend Thoresen as the European Enterprise in 1977. Townsend Thoresen was absorbed by P&O European Ferries in 1987 and the same year the vessel was renamed European Endeavour by the new owners. In 1996 P&O European Ferries transferred European Endeavour to P&O European Ferries' Irish Sea operation. European Endeavour was sold to Transeuropa Ferries in July 2002 while laid-up at Dunkirk and was renamed Gardenia for use on the Ostend – Ramsgate freight service. Following a refit, her maiden voyage between Ostend and Ramsgate took place on 15 January 2003.
