= Sally Line =

British ferry operator on the English Channel and North Sea

- Industry: Passenger transportation
- Founded: 1981
- Defunct: 1998
- Fate: Closure
- Headquarters: Ramsgate, United Kingdom
- Area served: English Channel
- Parent: 1981-1987: Rederi Ab Sally; 1987-1990: Effoa and Johnson Line; 1990-1995: EffJohn; 1995-1998:Silja Line/Neptun Maritime

Sally Line UK (sometimes referred to as Sally Ferries UK) was a British ferry operator on the English Channel and North Sea.

== History ==
=== Background ===
Whilst historically, the port of Ramsgate had boasted a ferry service to France, these had ceased in 1966. In December 1979 a new ferry route between Dunkerque and Ramsgate was announced. This was to be operated by Dunkerque Ramsgate Ferries (DRF) and was run by Olau Line-founder; Ole Lauritzen and funded by the sale of his remaining 50% share in Olau Line to TT-Line. The service had originally been expected to utilise the Olau Line vessel; Olau Kent (for which the new facilities at Ramsgate had been designed), but actually was served by the much older ship Nuits St Georges, which commenced sailings in May 1980.

By the beginning of September 1980 a series of problems and the arrest of Nuits St Georges saw the collapse of DRF, which left the terminal at Ramsgate having to be mothballed.

Later in 1980, discussions commenced about a replacement service for Dunkerque Ramsgate Ferries, capitalising on the £6.25 million invested by Thanet District Council to create the ferry facilities at Ramsgate. These discussions involved the Finnish shipping company Rederi Ab Sally, who were looking to expand their routes to the UK and had already discounted a North Sea route, and shipping consultant Michael Kingshott who had already assisted with development of new ferry facilities at Sheerness.

=== Early years ===
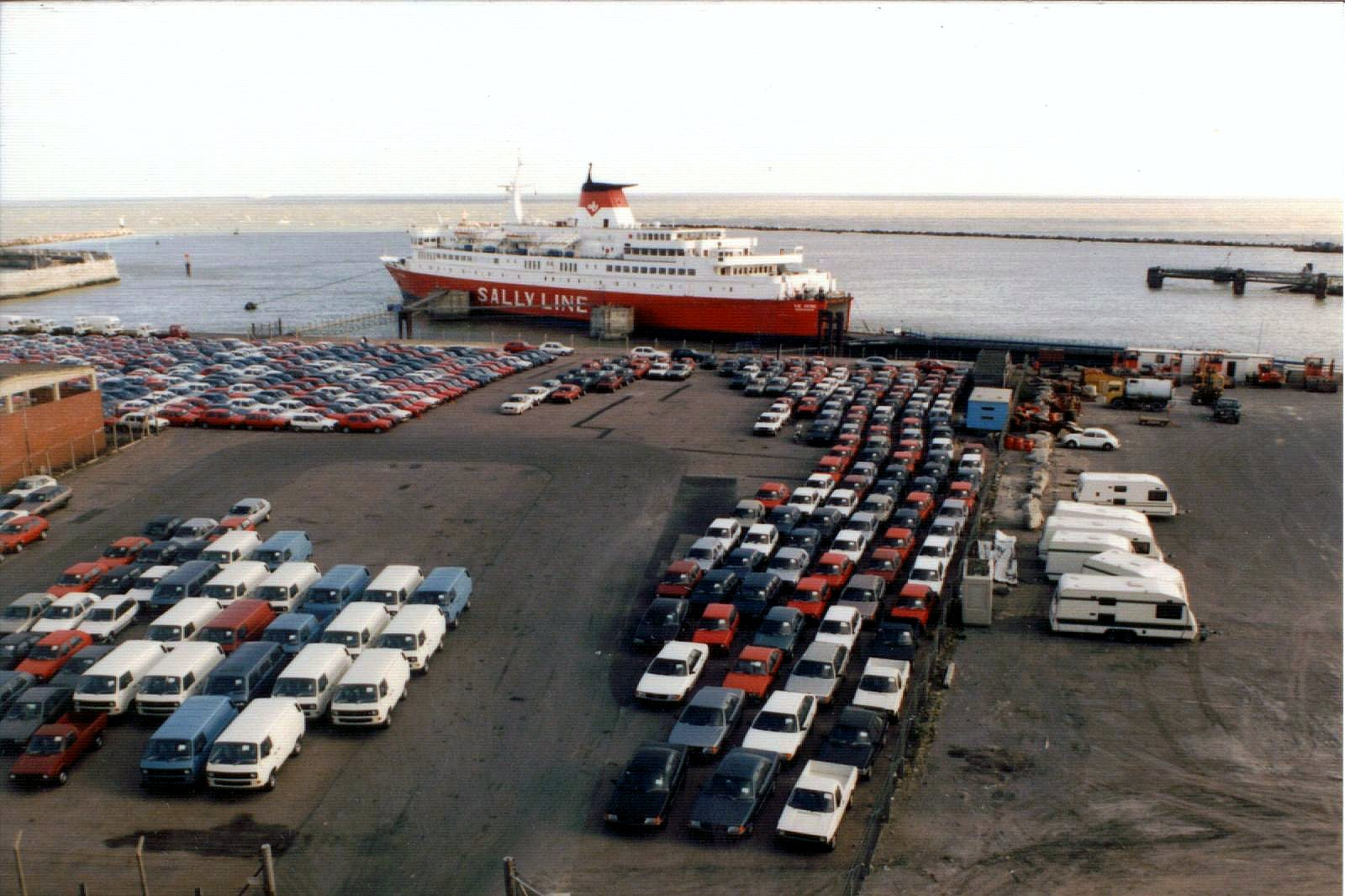
The Viking (1983-1989) during the 1980s at Ramsgate Ferry Port

Sally Line was officially founded in April 1981 and led by Michael Kingshott as a subsidiary of the Rederi Ab Sally, and initially marketed as Sally Viking Line, with a livery that was nearly identical with that of Viking Line, a Baltic Sea ferry consortium of which Sally was a member. The naming scheme of Sally's Viking Line ships was also carried over to the UK operations, with ships named either The Viking or Viking [number].

In 1982 Sally Line expanded to a two ship service, though there would be a variety of changes in fleet over this period for a variety of reasons, including reallocation of ships by the parent company and vessel sales combining with the ending of charter periods.

Sally Line were not only the ferry operator on the route, but also operated the Port of Ramsgate under a 90 year agreement with Thanet District Council. By 1983 it became clear that the exposed nature of the port needed addressing, and a breakwater scheme was instituted to provide protection to the port and allowing fewer cancelled sailings due to poor weather. As a result of this the Sally Line operations were reorganised with a separate company being established; Port Ramsgate Ltd to assist with the development of Ramsgate as a port for other operators.

By 1984 the amount of cargo carried by Sally Line had increased to such a degree that Sally reached an agreement with French state controlled Compagnie Générale Maritime (CGM) to form a joint service called Sally/CGM Freight Service. CGM were already involved in the Poole-based freight ferry company; Truckline Ferries.

In 1985 the services were rebranded dropping 'Viking' from the name to become simply Sally Line.

=== Takeover, and expansion attempts and successes ===
After many years of losses and an acrimonious withdrawal in 1985 from the Sealink consortium, the state-owned Belgian company Regie voor Maritiem Transport (RMT) opened discussions with Sally Line in 1986 about moving their services (now operated in a pooling agreement with Townsend Thoresen) to Ramsgate. This would require routing rail traffic to Port of Ramsgate, initially via Ramsgate railway station, but with an envisaged branch line being built to serve the port directly. This did not come to pass and caused Sally/Port Ramsgate Ltd. some issues, as it forced the collapse into receivership of the contractor for their construction works, John Howard & Company. However, this would not be the last word in a relationship between RMT and Sally.

In 1987 Rederi Ab Sally, including the Sally Line UK operations, was sold to Effoa and Johnson Line, Sally's Baltic Sea rivals and owners of Silja Line. As a result of the change of ownership, a new Sally Line UK livery was adopted in 1988 and the company's ships were renamed with a Sally-prefix, with the dropping of 'Viking' from the names severing any vestigial ties back to the parent company's former Viking Line operations.

The idea of a rail link to Ramsgate persisted and during 1986/1987 serious discussions took place between Sally/Port Ramsgate, the British Railways Board, SNCF and SNCB about moving train ferry services away from a Sealink British Ferries-controlled berth at Dover Western Docks to Ramsgate. Ultimately a decision by the Department of the Environment to establish a public enquiry would have delayed the project to such an extent that discussions ceased; it resulted in Sally Line making a public declaration of their intention to expand and acquire other Sealink channel routes.

In 1989, Sally led a consortium with Globe Investment Trust, 3i and merchant bank Tranwood Earl, who attempted a hostile takeover of Red Funnel. The opening offer of 205p was swiftly rejected and despite threats by Sally of a competing cross-Solent service, or a purchase of Sealink's Isle of Wight operations, a revised offer of 236p per share was made. Associated British Ports emerged as a White Knight in battle, firstly taking a 1% stake in Red Funnel and then extending this to a 264p per share full takeover offer. Sally withdrew and ABP's takeover of Red Funnel was given the go ahead in October 1989. Also in 1989, Sally Line part-owner Johnson Line was one of the bidders involved, in the privatisation of SMZ, and although they were unsuccessful, losing out to Stena Line, these services may have been combined with those of Sally Line from Ramsgate.

In 1990, Sally's parent companies Effoa and Johnson Line merged to form EffJohn. After the abortive bid for Red Funnel, but still seeking expansion opportunities, Sally acquired Ramsgate-based Schiaffino Line to expand their own freight services, and adding a route to Belgium in the process

=== Final years ===
In 1992, SNAT announced plans to close their Newhaven to Dieppe service, which they had operated since the withdrawal of Sealink in 1985. Sally Line were rumoured to be on the verge of launching their own service, but ultimately lost out to Stena Line who stepped in to operate the service.

Regie voor Maritiem Transport (RMT), the Belgian-government owned former member of the Sealink consortium until 1985, announced in 1993 that having operated in conjunction with European Ferries under the Townsend Thoresen and P&O European Ferries branding (1985-1990), and then independently as Oostende Lines, they would enter a new pooling agreement with Sally Line from January 1994. This agreement saw their conventional ferry and Boeing Jetfoil services move their UK port from Dover to Ramsgate, ending the link between Dover and Belgium after over 100 years. Sally Line believed that the five-year 50/50 partnership between them and RMT would put Sally in a good position to purchase RMT upon any future privatisation by the Belgian government. Services commenced on 1 January as planned, however further dredging work delayed the introduction of the Prins Filip until the end of the month. The shallow depth of Ramsgate would see a continual risk of grounding at low water during her years operating from the port. Sally Line would expand further during 1994 with the launch of a new freight route between Ramsgate and Vlissingen. This was quickly established to take advantage of the announced closure of Olau Line services between Sheerness and Vlissingen in May 1994.

In 1995, the parent company; Effjohn changed their name to Silja Oy Ab (Silja Line). Three years later the name was changed again, this time to Neptun Maritime. As a result of this change, Sally Line adapted a new livery and a logo similar to that of Silja Line. Michael Kingshott resigned from his role as Chief Executive in July 1995 to join the shipping company John I Jacobs and was replaced by Bill Moses; formerly of Eurolink Ferries, Hoverspeed, Sealink and Olau Line.

In September 1996, after a reported nine months of discussions, and the announcement that RMT services were to cease in 1997; Sally announced a new joint venture with Holyman to be known as Holyman Sally Ferries. The joint venture, commencing in March 1997, was to deploy two of Holyman's 81-metre catamarans on the route to Belgium, and was two-thirds owned by Holyman and one-third owned by the Sally parent company, by now; Silja Line. Sally's freight operations which operated under the name of Sally Freight remained separate from the joint venture with Holyman and the traditional Sally route between Ramsgate and Dunkerque closed in April 1997, being replaced with a fast service which closed in October the same year.

Throughout the 1990s, poor access to the Port of Ramsgate was a continual problem and with no progress being made on a proposed link road despite three public enquiries, this became a particular bone of contention between Sally and government at local and national levels. The link road would eventually open in 2000.

The Holyman Sally venture was not financially viable and Holyman became partners with Hoverspeed and moved the service to Dover in March 1998 as Holyman Hoverspeed Ltd. Silja Line's rumoured plans to sell their UK operations came to light around the same time as the cessation of the Holyman joint venture and Sally Line's passenger operations were restructured and marketed as Sally Direct from May 1998, in what would prove to be a last ditch attempt to save the company. Ultimately the end came at midnight on 20 November 1998 at which point operations of Sally Direct, Sally Freight and Port Ramsgate ceased, and the port at Ramsgate returned to Thanet District Council.

== Fleet ==
Name	Built	In service	Tonnage	History
The Viking	1974 (Jos L. Meyer Verft, Papenburg, Germany)	1981–1983	5,286 GRT	Scrapped at Aliağa Ship Breaking Yard in 2015
Viking 6 Sun Express	1967 (Langesunds Mekaniske Værksted, Langesund, Norway/Completion at Framnæs Mekaniske Værksted, Sandefjord, Norway)	1982, 1985–1986; 1985	5,073 GRT	Scrapped at Aliağa Ship Breaking Yard in 2001
Prinsessan Désirée	1971 (Aalborg Værft, Aalborg, Denmark)	1982	9,149 GT	Branded externally as Sally Viking 2 but not renamed, currently in service (as of 2025) as Ionian Star with Starlines
Viking 3	1972 (Jos L. Meyer Verft, Papenburg, Germany)	1983–1984	4,299 GRT	Scrapped at Aliağa Ship Breaking Yard in 2022
The Viking; Wasa Prince	1974 (Schichau Unterweser, Bremerhaven, Germany)	1983–1989; 1989–1990	4,655 GRT	Scrapped at Aliağa Ship Breaking Yard in 2024
Njegos	1971 (Schiffbau-Gesellschaft Unterweser AG, Bremerhaven, Germany	1984	3,999 GT	Scrapped at Chittagong Ship Breaking Yard in 2022
Le Mans	1978 (Dubigeon-Normandie, Nantes, France)	1984-1985	4,156 GT	Scrapped in 2010
Viking 2 Sally Sky; Eurotraveller	1976 (Schichau Unterweser, Bremerhaven, Germany)	1986–1988; 1988–1996; 1997–1998	4,998 GRT (until 1990); 14,558 GRT (1990 onwards)	Scrapped at Aliağa Ship Breaking Yard in 2016
Sally Star	1981 (Wärtsilä, Helsinki, Finland)	1988–1997	9,120 GRT	Currently in service (as of 2025) as Wasa Express
Botnia Express	1972 (Jos L. Meyer Verft, Papenburg, Germany)	1989	4,152 GRT	Scrapped at Aliağa Ship Breaking Yard in 2021
Schiaffino; Sally Eurobridge	1977 (Rickmers Werft, Bremerhaven, Germany)	1990; 1994	6,041 GRT	Grounded 2008 as MS Riverdance, subsequently scrapped
Bazias 3 Sally Euroroute	1984 (Șantierul Naval, Galați, Romania)	1991–1993; 1993–1996	9,000 GRT	Currently in service (as of 2025) as Iskenderun with Asi Marine
Bazias 4 Sally Eurolink	1984 (Șantierul Naval, Galați, Romania)	1991–1993; 1993–1997	9,082 GRT	Currently in service (as of 2025) as Gulf Livestock 2 with Gulf Navigation
Sally Sun	1979 (Falkenbergs Varv, Falkenberg, Sweden)	1992–1995	6,643 GRT	Currently in service (as of 2025) as Gubal Trader with Trasmediterránea
Sally Euroway; Euroway	1976 (Kröger-Werft, Rendsburg, Germany)	1995–1997; 1997–1998	9,097 GT	Currently in service (as of 2025) as Dada Star in Lebanon
Purbeck	1978 (Société Nouvelle des Ateliers et Chantiers du Havre, Le Havre, France)	1995-1997	2,736 GT	Sank in 2018 at anchorage in Puerto La Cruz, Venezuela, hull caught fire during dismantling in 2023
Eurostar; Eurocruiser	1976 (J.J Sietas KG Schiffswerft, Hamburg, Germany)	1995-1997	13,867 GRT	Scrapped at Alang Ship Breaking Yard in 2014
Condor 10	1993 (Incat Tasmania, Tasmania, Australia)	1997	3,240 GT	Currently in service (as of 2025) as Tiger with Tiger Shipping Co
Holyman Diamant	1996 (Incat Tasmania, Tasmania, Australia)	1997-1998	4,305 GT	Currently in service (as of 2025) as Jaume III with Baleària
Holyman Rapide	1996 (Incat Tasmania, Tasmania, Australia)	1997-1998	4,112 GT	Currently in service (as of 2025) as Jaume II with Baleària Caribbean
Eurovoyager	1978 (Cockerill Yards, Hoboken, Belgium)	1998	12,110 GT	Scrapped at Aliağa Ship Breaking Yard in 2012

== Routes ==
- (United Kingdom) Ramsgate - (France) Dunkerque 1981-1997
- (United Kingdom) Ramsgate - (Belgium) Ostend 1990-1998
- (United Kingdom) Ramsgate - (Netherlands) Vlissingen 1994
- (United Kingdom) Dartford - (Netherlands) Vlissingen 1994-1996

== Former Sally Line routes today ==
Services between Ramsgate and Ostend were taken up by TransEuropa Ferries, a subsidiary of TransEuropa Shipping Lines d.o.o. (TSL) of Koper, Slovenia on 21 November 1998, the day after closure of Sally Line services.

TransEuropa Ferries ceased operations on 18 April 2013 and filed for bankruptcy on 25 April 2013. Since 2013, there have been no ferry services from Ramsgate.

In October 2017, it was announced that Seaborne Freight would operate an Ostend - Ramsgate ro-ro freight ferry service from March using three ships, including the MS Nord Pas-de-Calais. On 22 December 2018, the company was awarded a £13.8 million contract to run ferry services between Ramsgate and Ostend to lessen the consequences of probable capacity constraints on the Dover - Calais route after 29 March 2019 in the case of a no-deal Brexit. The contract was cancelled by the Department for Transport on 9 February 2019 after Arklow Shipping, reported to be Seaborne's backer, pulled out.

Following the end the joint venture between Sally Line and Holyman in 1998, the Ramsgate - Ostend high speed service was relocated to Dover and jointly operated by Holyman with Hoverspeed. This service ceased upon closure of Hoverspeed in 2005.

The Dartford - Vlissingen route was taken over by Jacobs Holdings subsidiary; Dart Line in January 1996. Jacobs was owned by former Sally Line executive; Michael Kingshott. Dart Line moved the service to Shell Haven in 2000.
