= Transeuropa Ferries =

Ferries between Ostend, Belgium and Ramsgate, England

- Industry: Freight and passenger transportation
- Predecessor: Sally Line
- Founded: 21 November 1998
- Defunct: 25 April 2013
- Fate: Bankrupt
- Headquarters: Ostend, Belgium
- Area served: English Channel
- Parent: Transeuropa Shipping Lines d.o.o.
- Website: www.transeuropaferries.com

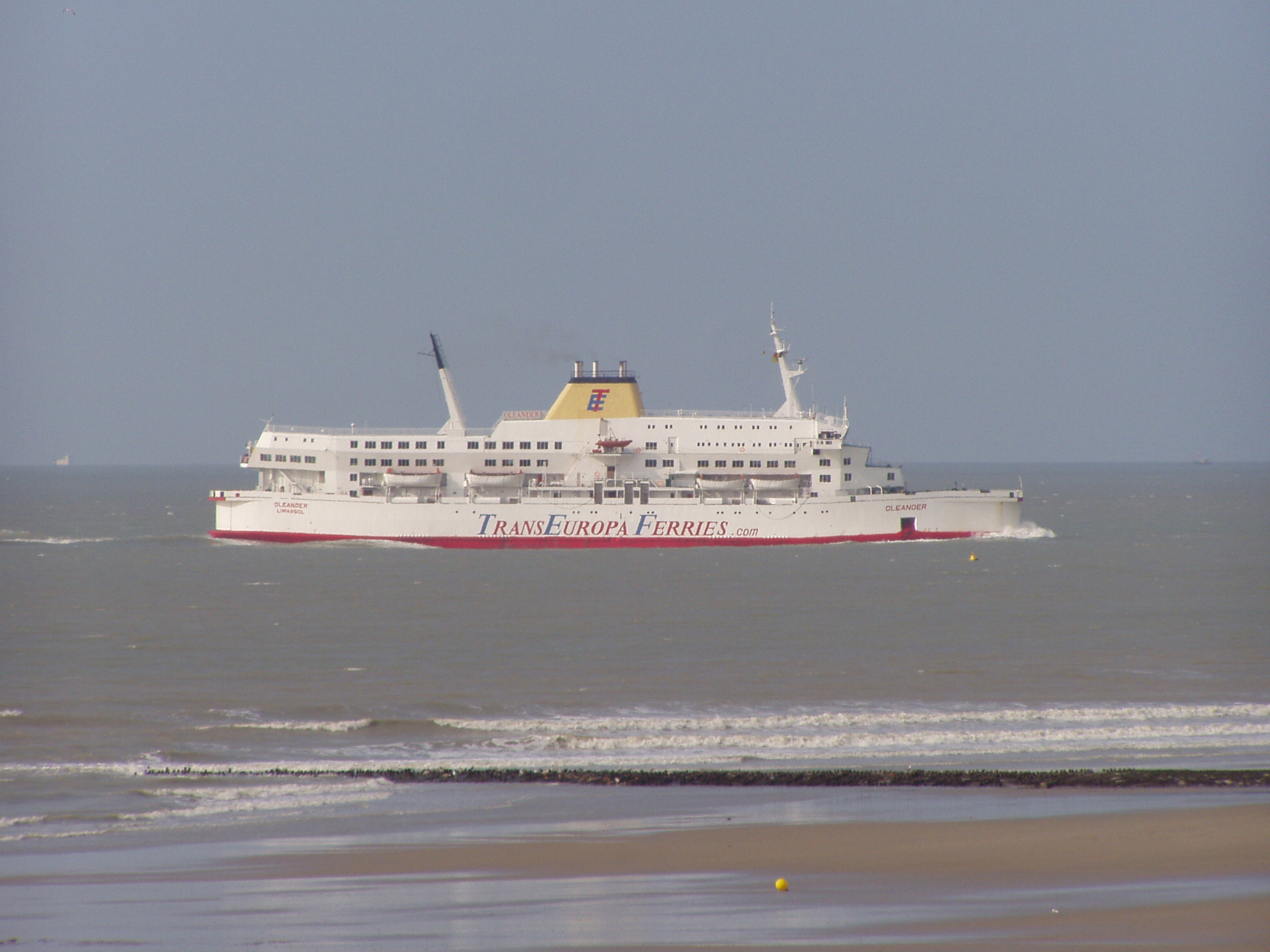
Transeuropa ferry Oleander approaching Ostend on 2 August 2005.

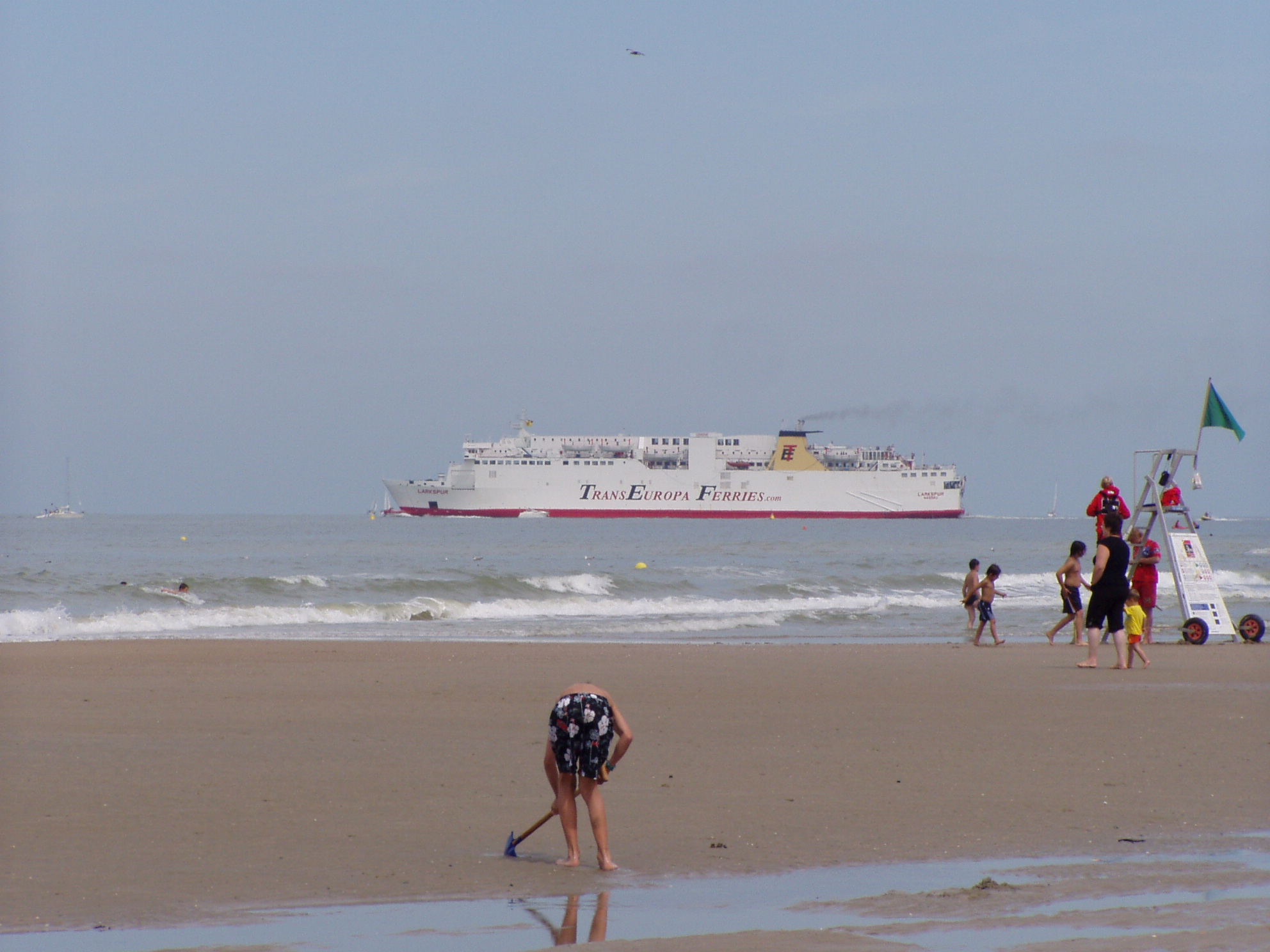
Transeuropa ferry Larkspur leaving Ostend in 2006

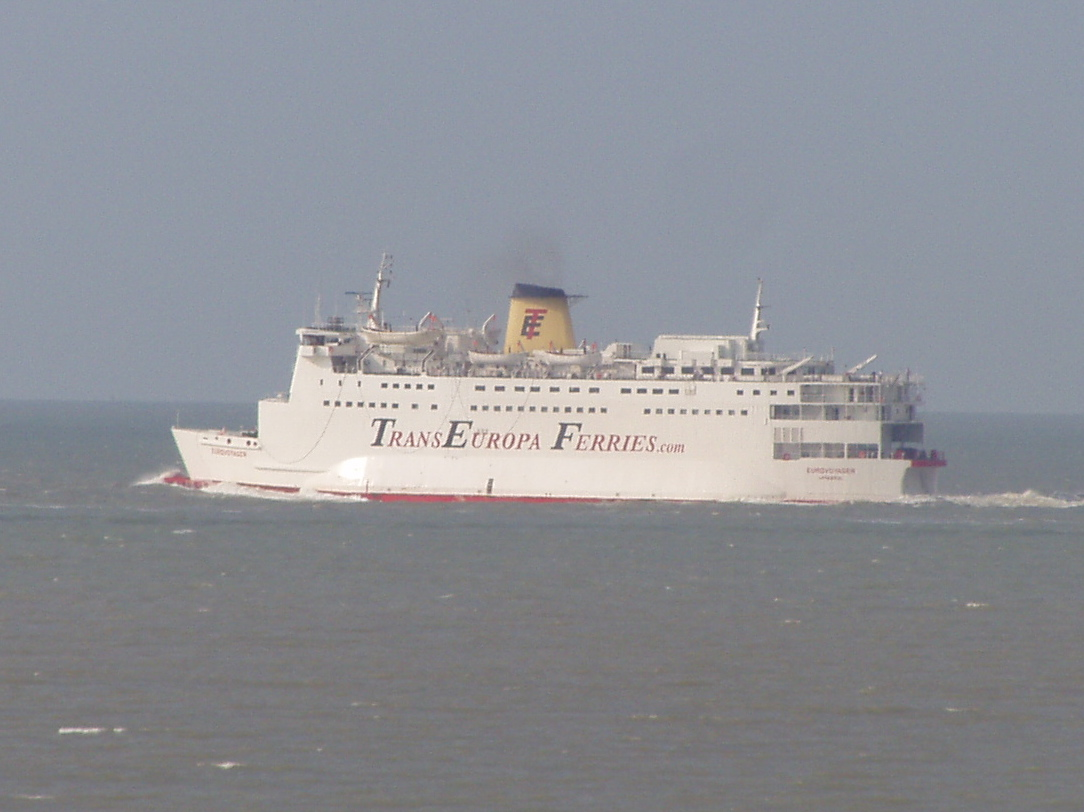
Transeuropa ferry Eurovoyager leaving Ostend in August 2005

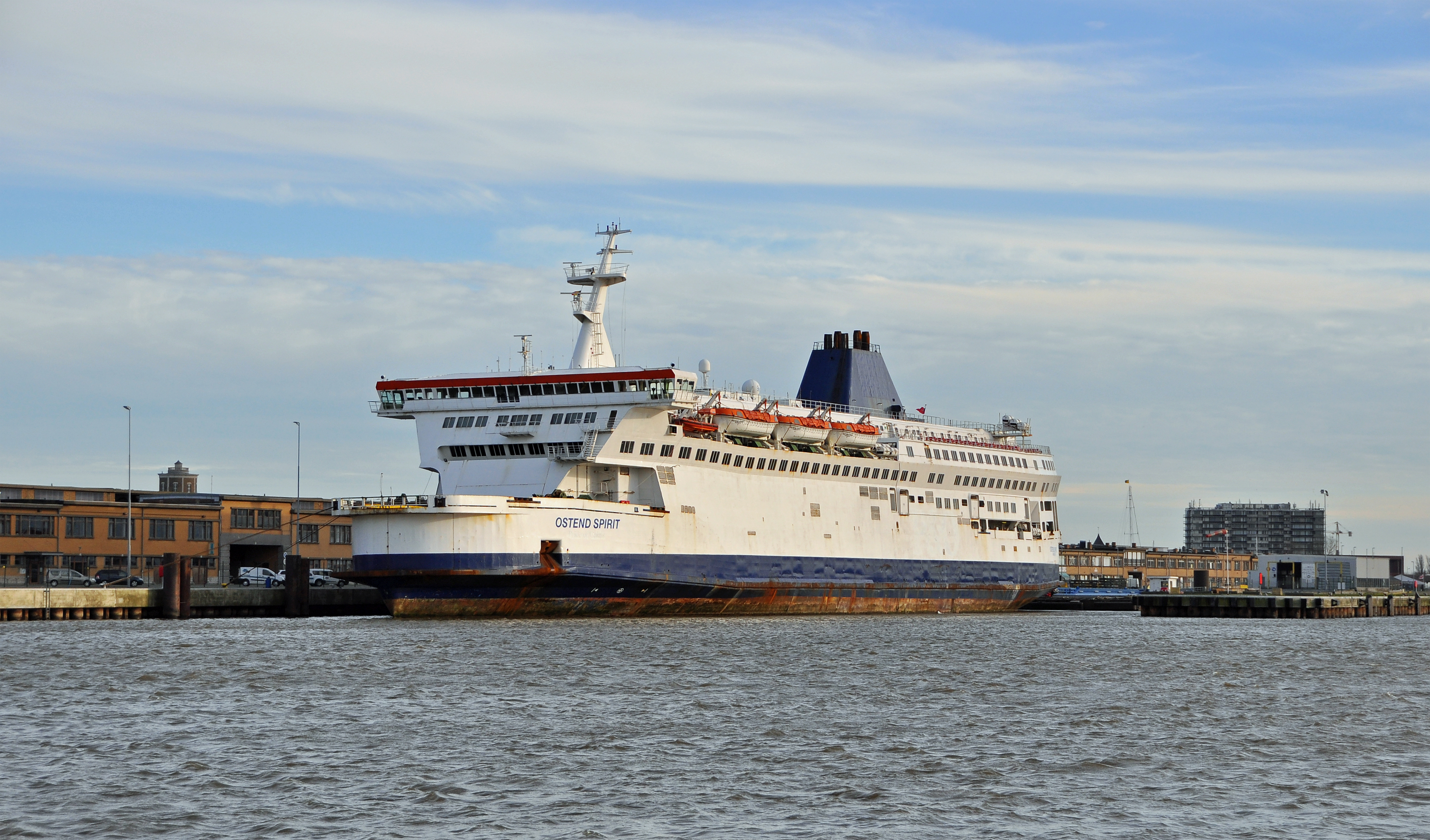
Ferry Ostend Spirit (formerly Pride of Calais) in the harbor of Ostend, December 2012

TransEuropa Ferries was a freight and passenger ferry company operating between Ramsgate, Kent, UK and Ostend, West Flanders, Belgium from 1998 to 2013, with three or more ships. The company suspended operations on 18 April 2013, and on 25 April 2013 the line filed to initiate bankruptcy procedures.

== History ==
TransEuropa Shipping Lines d.o.o. (TSL) of Koper, Slovenia started a ro-ro freight ferry service between Ramsgate and Ostend on 21 November 1998 following the closure of Sally Line's services and the purchase of assets of Regie voor Maritiem Transport from the Belgian government. TSL's Belgian subsidiary TransEuropa Ferries NV was founded on 1 June 2001 to take over the cross-channel operation.

On 20 July 2004 TransEuropa started a car and passenger ferry service from Ostend to Ramsgate to supplement their existing freight service. Foot passengers were not catered for on this crossing, which typically took four to five hours. Between 2010 and 2011 TransEuropa Ferries operated a joint service on the route with LD Lines.

The company operated via a direct sales channel, declining to sell through travel agents.

On 18 April 2013 the company stopped sailing and on 25 April is filed for bankruptcy

== Former Fleet ==
Vessel	In Service	Status
Larkspur	1999–2013	Laid up after TEF Bankruptcy, scrapped in 2016.
Gardenia	2002–2013	Laid up after TEF Bankruptcy, scrapped in 2016.
Ostend Spirit	2013	Scrapped in 2013.
Laburnum	1993–2003	Scrapped in 2011.
Wisteria	1995–2000	Scrapped in 2007.
Primrose	1998–2010	Scrapped in 2011.
Eurovoyager	1998–2010	Scrapped in 2012.
Roseanne	1999–2003	Became Strofades IV with m.c.c.l.; scrapped 2011 after a kidnapping incident.
Oleander	2001–2010	Became Sherbatskiy with Acciona, scrapped 2015.
Begonia	2002–2005	Now Via Mare.
Wisteria	2005–2006	Became Vronskiy with Acciona. Scrapped in 2021.
Ostende Spirit	2010–2011	Now Isle of Innisfree for Irish Ferries Calais.

== Bibliography ==
- Smith, Dean (2015). The TransEuropa Years: 1998–2013. Ramsey, Isle of Man: Ferry Publications. ISBN 9781906608781.
