= MS Isle of Inishmore =

Two ships have been named Isle of Inishmore:

- MS Isle of Inishmore (1993), in service under this name 1993–1996
- MS Isle of Inishmore (1996), in service under this name from 1996
