= Regie voor Maritiem Transport =

Belgian ferry company

- Industry: Passenger transportation
- Founded: 1846
- Defunct: 1997
- Headquarters: Ostend, Belgium
- Area served: English Channel and North Sea

Oostende Lines Logo

Regie voor Maritiem Transport (RMT) was the Belgian state-owned ferry service and operated ferries on the Ostend-Dover route under the name Oostende Lines. For the last few years until its demise in February 1997, the ferries from Ostend went to Ramsgate instead of Dover in partnership with Sally Line.

== History ==
On 28 February 1997 the Belgian state closed an important and historical period concerning transport of passengers from and to the UK. The first official crossing ever under the Belgian state took place in 1846, a history spanning 151 years.

Service was inaugurated between Ostend and Dover on 4 March 1846, by the paddle steamer Chemin de Fer, which was later renamed Diamant.

Owing to the great competition with lines serving Calais, Dunkirk, Zeebrugge, Antwerp, Rotterdam and Hook of Holland, RMT upgraded their fleet through the years, from paddle steamers to turbine steamers, diesel motor vessels, and finally high speed ferries. Many of the line's ships were built at Antwerp by the shipyard of SA John Cockerill.

A rare accident for the company occurred when the RMT paddle steamers Princesse Henriette and Comtesse de Flandre collided in heavy fog on 29 March 1889 when both attempt to avoid collision with a fishing smack offshore between Ruytingen and Dunkirk. Princesse Henriette struck Comtesse de Flandre on the starboard side, just abaft the paddle box, nearly slicing the vessel in half. The inrush of water caused a boiler explosion, and the Comtesse de Flandre sank with a loss of 15 lives, of whom four were passengers. Princesse Henriette rescued 32 survivors, including 19 passengers. Among the survivors was Jerome Napoleon Bonaparte II.

A major shift in propulsion took place in 1905 with the construction of RMT's first turbine steamer, Princesse Elisabeth.

RMT ferries saw use in both world wars. Early in the First World War, the turbine steamer Jan Breydel evacuated Elisabeth of Bavaria, Queen of Belgium and the royal children on 28 August 1914. Later, vessels of the line evacuated diplomats, troops and important officials before the fall of Antwerp.

One RMT paddle steamer, Flandre, fell into German hands and was employed by them as a depot ship. Flandre was scuttled at Ostend upon the withdrawal of German troops in October 1918.

The paddle steamer Marie Henriette was wrecked on 24 October 1914 on rocks while attempting to enter Barfleur with 650 wounded military personnel on board. The accident was attributed to the harbour lights having been unexpectedly extinguished.

Later, the paddle steamer Princesse Clementine and turbine steamer Princesse Elisabeth were employed as fast military transports between Dover and ports in Flanders, whilst the paddle steamer Rapide and turbine steamer Stad Antwerpen saw service as hospital ships. The company's newest vessel at the time, the turbine steamer Ville de Liège, was used as a fast evacuation transport (technically not a hospital ship, as the steamer was armed and painted in dazzle camouflage).

Owing to its lower speed, the line's oldest vessel at the time, the paddle steamer Belgique (built in 1862) was employed during the war in more militarily protected waters as an ammunition transport between Southampton and Le Havre.

After augmenting the fleet postwar with additional turbine ferries, RMT received its first diesel ferry, Prince Baudouin, in 1934.

When RMT began transporting automobiles and lorries as well as passengers, cars had to be loaded onto a steamer's aft deck and offloaded again using a quay crane. Service was greatly improved in 1936 when the turbine steamer Ville de Liège was renovated as a roll on-roll off car ferry and renamed London-Istanbul.

After the fall of Belgium and France in June 1940, vessels of RMT were taken into the Royal Navy for use in the landing ship infantry role. These included the steamers Prince Charles (270 troops), Prince Leopold (255 troops), Princesse Astrid (247 troops), Princesse Josephine Charlotte (210 troops), Prince Baudouin (384 troops), Prins Albert (350 troops), and Prince Philippe (350 troops). An older steamer, Princesse Marie José, was employed as an auxiliary patrol vessel. HMS Prince Philippe was lost in a collision on 15 July 1941, whilst HMS Prince Leopold was sunk by a U-boat on 29 July 1944.

After the war, the surviving ships were returned to RMT. In 1949 the company took delivery of the motor vessel Prinses Josephine Charlotte, the first of a series of car ferries.

The standard timetable for most of the 1980s and 90s saw six crossings per day in each direction.

In addition to traditional car ferries, RMT also operated two Boeing Jetfoils (for foot-passengers only) that reduced crossing times from 4 hours to 100 minutes. They were popular with connecting rail passengers, and a supplement was payable. However, these services were prone to cancellation in bad weather, with passengers re-directed to the car ferry.

In response to the announcement of the Channel Tunnel project, RMT ordered one of the first cross-channel super ferries. At 28,828 gross register tons, the Prins Filip was the largest ferry operating on the short sea routes of the English Channel from 1991 to 2001 (with the introduction in the latter year of the SeaFrance Rodin).

Nonetheless, the opening of the Channel Tunnel in 1994 led to shorter transit times across the Channel for cars and freight, while new high-speed Eurostar services running directly between London and Brussels rendered traditional rail-sea-rail journeys obsolete. Unable to stem heavy financial losses, the Belgian government took the decision to close the company in 1997. Many of the assets were sold to Transeuropa Ferries which revived the route between Ramsgate and Ostend, first as a freight-only service, and subsequently taking passengers and cars. However, this itself closed in 2013 and since P&O Ferries closed its Hull-Zeebrugge service in 2021 there is currently no car ferry between the U.K. and Belgium.

== Sealink ==
As part of the Sealink consortium, Regie voor Maritiem Transport connected Oostende railway station with Dover Western Docks (the Sealink and Southern Region of British Rail) terminal. At Ostend, direct international rail connections ran daily as far as Cologne, Berlin, Vienna, Copenhagen and Moscow.

The UK arm of Sealink was privatized in 1984, and disagreements with the new owners of the UK operation led to RMT leaving the consortium.

Between 1985 and 1990, RMT operated in partnership with European Ferries under the Townsend Thoresen and P&O badges, and subsequently independently, as Oostende Lines.

In 1993, RMT went into partnership with Sally Line transferring its UK terminal from the Port of Dover to the Port of Ramsgate. However, inferior road and rail connections did not help the company's financial position and contributed to its financial losses and eventual closure.

== See also ==
- MS Isle of Innesfree
