= Jean-Marc Puissesseau =

President and chair of Calais and Boulogne

Jean-Marc Puissesseau is president and chairman of the ports of Calais and Boulogne (French: Société d’Exploitation des Ports du Détroit).
