= Kingscote Park =

Kingscote Park may refer to:

- Kingscote Park, Blackpool, a park in Blackpool, Lancashire, England
- Kingscote Park (Gloucestershire), a house in Kingscote, near Tetbury, Gloucestershire, England
