= Moor Park, Blackpool =

Park in Bispham, Lancashire, England

Moor Park
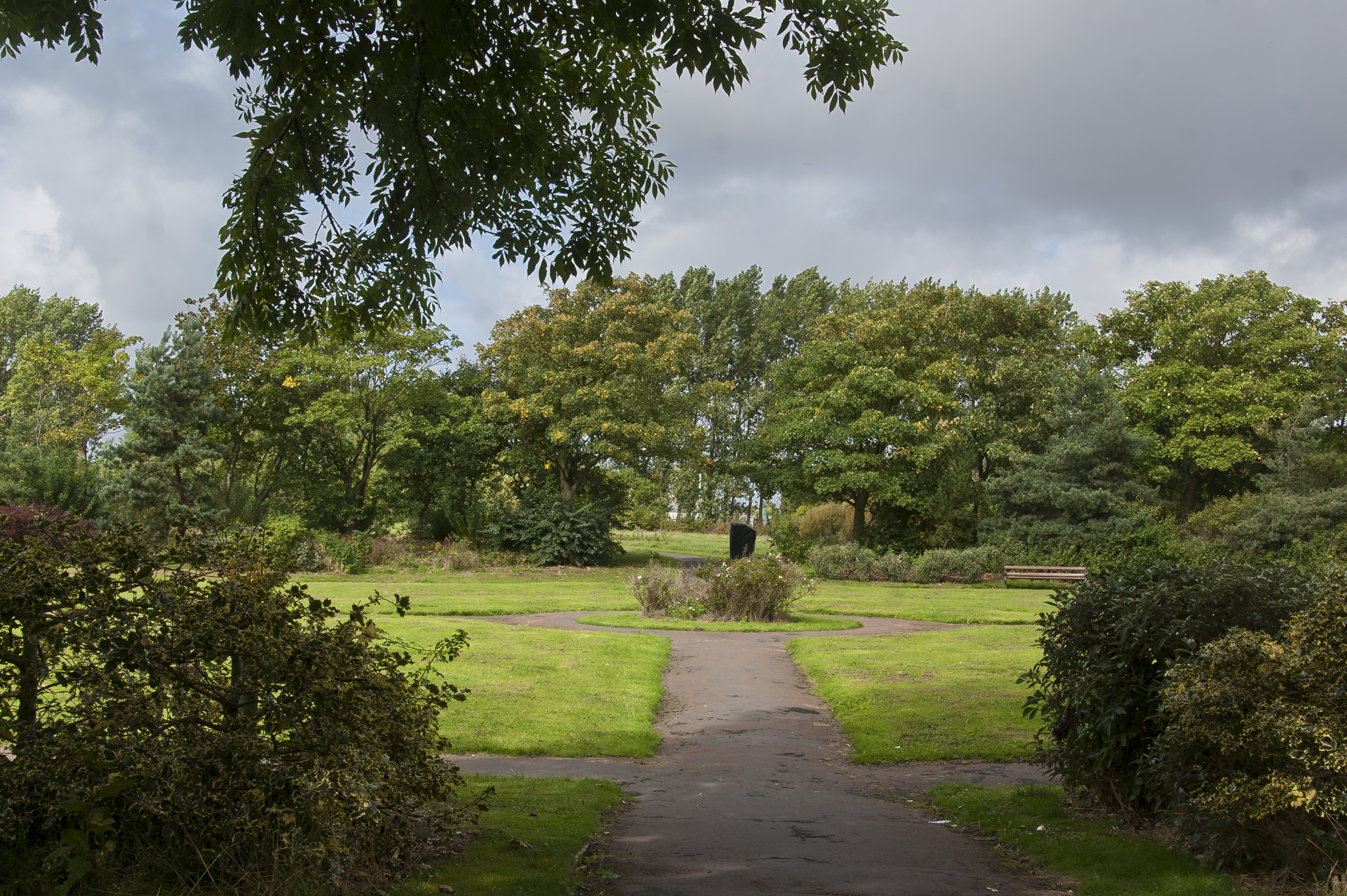
- View across Moor Park (2018)

- Location within Blackpool Location within Lancashire
- Type: Public park
- Location: Bispham, Blackpool
- Coordinates: 53.8481°N 3.0321°W
- Created: 195?
- Operator: Blackpool Council
- Status: Open all year

Moor Park is a municipal park located in the Moor Park area of Bispham in Blackpool on the Fylde coast in Lancashire, England.

The park is bordered by Bispham Road to the west, Moor Park Avenue to the south, housing on Bristol Avenue to the north and businesses on Bristol Avenue to the east. It is opposite Moor Park Primary School.

== History and amenities ==
The park was built in the 1950s and has a children's playground, a swimming pool (built in, tennis courts, parkland and a (now disused) bowling green. There is also a council owned skatepark on land on the other side of Moor Park Avenue locally known as the 'New Park'.

== Moor Park swimming pool ==
Moor Park swimming pool is located in the northwest corner of Moor Park on Bristol Avenue. It has a 25-metre pool and a separate teaching pool.

== Fylde Memorial Arboretum and Community Woodland ==
The Fylde Memorial Arboretum and Community Woodland is located in fields next to Moor Park School. It was unveiled on 23 February 2009 following a £14,000 grant from the Forestry Commission English Woodland Grant Scheme and funds from First TransPennine Express. Blackpool Council's Parks Service designed the plans for the memorial woodland, while rangers worked with local school children and community groups to plant trees.

Officially opened in June 2009 with a service of dedication, the arboretum has a main memorial plaque as well as 16 smaller plinths. It is run by the Arboretum Committee, an offshoot of the Fylde Ex-Service Liaison Committee, with the aim of providing the service associations, and the people of Blackpool and the Fylde, with "a place of peace and beauty in which to remember their fallen comrades and loved ones". The woodland has 2,500 trees, from the Forestry Commission, all planted and available for dedication.

== Friends of Moor Park ==
The Friends of Moor Park group was set up in January 2007 by local residents to help restore the park. The group's aims include to restore the disused bowling green and improve the park's footpaths.

== See also ==
- Bispham Rock Gardens
- George Bancroft Park, Blackpool
- Kincraig Lake Ecological Reserve
- Kingscote Park, Blackpool
- Salisbury Woodland Gardens, Blackpool
- Stanley Park, Blackpool
