= Stanley Park, Blackpool =

Park in Blackpool, Lancashire, England

Stanley Park
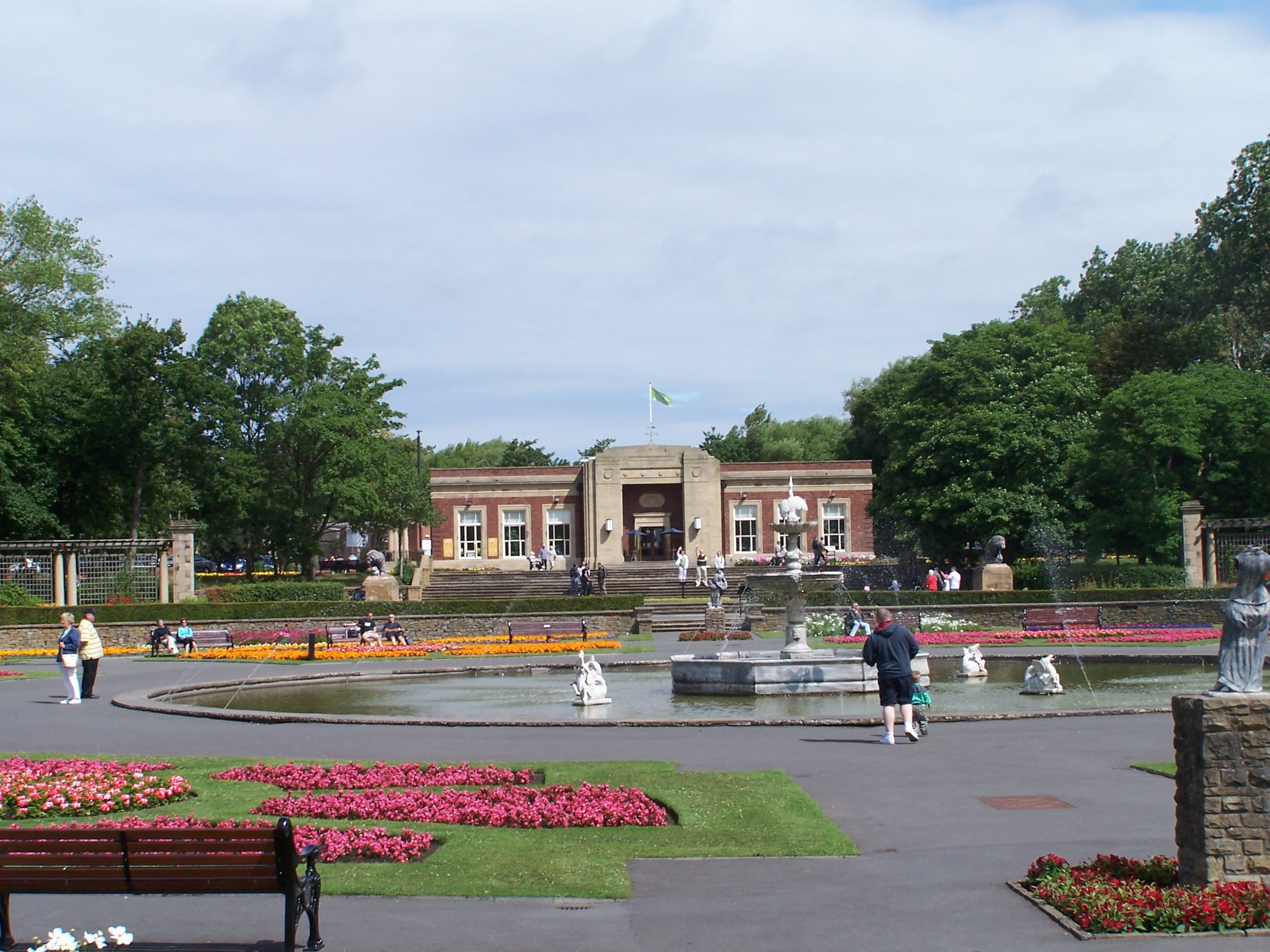
- View of the Stanley Park's Italian gardens and art deco cafe

- Location within Blackpool
- Location: Blackpool, Lancashire, England
- OS grid: SD 3235
- Coordinates: 53°48′53″N 3°01′45″W
- Area: 256 acres (104 ha)
- Created: 1926 (100 years ago)
- Visitors: 2 million per year
- Open: All year: dawn to dusk
- Status: Open
- Website: Official website

Listed Building – Grade II*
- Official name: Stanley Park, Blackpool
- Designated: 1 April 1986
- Reference no.: 1000952

Stanley Park is a public park in the town of Blackpool on the Fylde coast in Lancashire, England. It is the town's primary park and covers an area of approximately 104 hectares (260 acres). The park was designed to include significant sporting provisions, along with formal gardens, a boating lake and woodland area. It was designed and built in the 1920s, under the eye of Thomas Mawson.

It is located in the Great Marton and Layton areas of the town. It is Grade II* listed and is on the Register of Historic Parks and Gardens of special historic interest in England.

The park's largest gardens feature a fountain built with Italian marble and a number of statues including a pair of Medici Lions. The Italian gardens are overlooked by a cafe, designed by Mawson and built in a traditional Art Deco style, and include steps down to the boating lake. Surrounding the boating lake is a woodland area, including a protected area for wildlife. On one side of the lake is an amphitheatre surrounding a bandstand, also designed by Mawson.

Towards the centre of the park there is a crossroads with a clock tower, dedicated to William Cocker. It is close to the large children's play area, the tennis courts, all-weather pitches, BMX track, skate park and general grassy areas. Within the Stanley Park grounds stands a 5000-seat cricket ground, an 18-hole golf course designed by Alister MacKenzie, a sports centre, athletics ground and a model village attraction.

== History ==
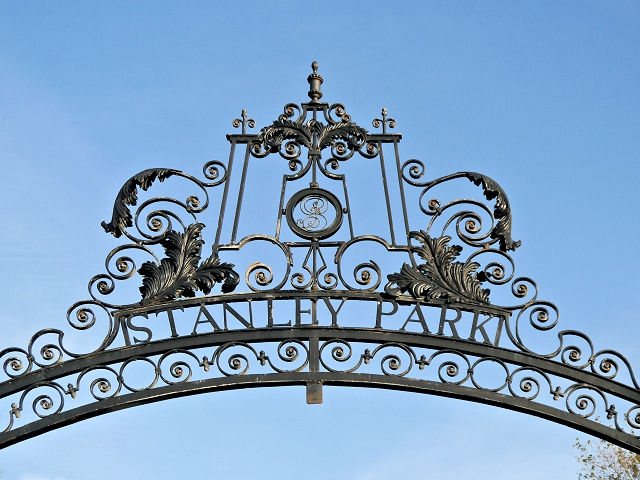
Ironwork over a Stanley Park gate

Due to large growth of Blackpool's population between 1870 and 1900 the council decided that an outdoor attraction was required, to "appeal to all ages and all classes". It took until the 1920s to begin implementation of the plans. Much of the land was sold to the council, for the purpose of constructing a park, by Albert Lindsay Parkinson and additional areas of land were compulsorily purchased and some donated (by mayor of Blackpool, John Bickerstaffe, T.M. Watson and William Lawson). The land previously consisted of "the most heterogeneous collection of hen runs, pigsties, stagnant ponds, caravan dwellings and stables we have ever come across. The buildings were of temporary nature, margarine boxes, tea chests, biscuit tins and petrol cans being pressed into service for walls and roofing material"

The plans for Stanley Park were drawn up by landscape architect and town planning company T.H. Mawson & Sons. A Lancashire businessman reportedly told Mawson that without the Blackpool resort there would be a 'revolution in Lancashire', as it was a popular destination for many industry workers. When the park came to be built in the 1920s, the provision of sporting activities for the middle classes was an important theme for British resort towns.

The park was opened on 2 October 1926 by the 17th Earl of Derby, on the same day as opening the new marine promenade. The marine promenade cost £320,000 and at the opening the Earl cut a black and white ribbon using gold scissors. He then gave the mayor half a crown to counteract his superstitions regarding the ribbon colours. The park was named "Stanley Park" after the Earl's family name and he opened the park using a golden key at the main gates. He was then driven to the Italian Gardens to address the crowds and acknowledged the towns motto 'Progress' and stated that Blackpool continued to be a town that continued to invest for the future. At the opening of the park in 1926 it was estimated the project had cost £250,000 (equivalent to £13,211,936 in 2025). News of the park opening spread as far as America and it was described as providing "for the recreational needs of the modern generation".

== Current status ==
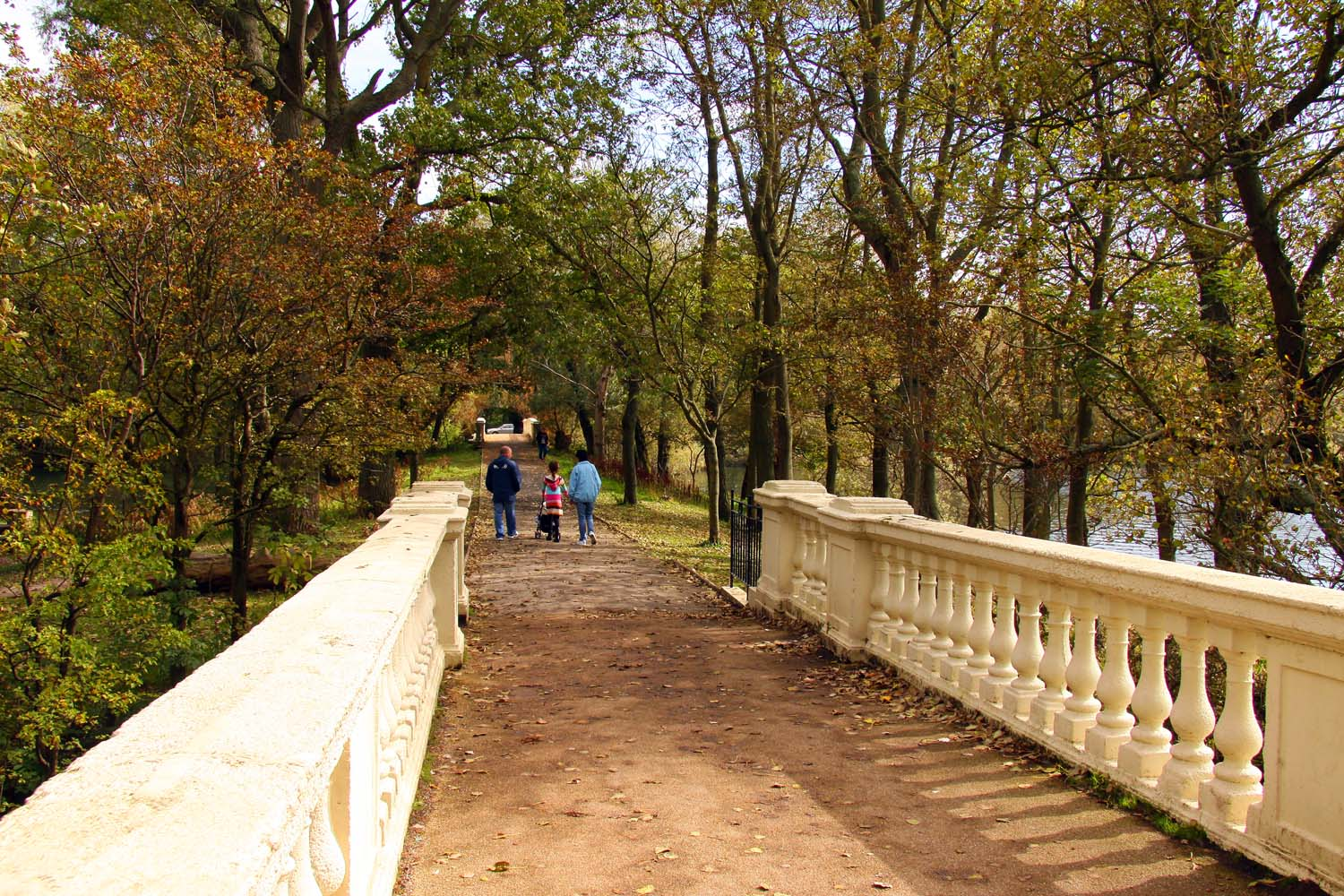
Woodland walks through Stanley park

Stanley Park covers 104 ha (260 acres) and is situated 1.5 kilometres (0.93 mi) north-east of the centre of Blackpool (OS National Grid Reference: SD 3235; National Grid Reference: 332500, 435700). The park is located between the residential areas of Great Marton and Layton and is surrounded by housing except on the east side. The original plans specified that there should be no housing on the park side of the road, so all housing is on the opposite side. The park is enclosed by 3 roads; East Park Drive, West Park Drive and North Park Drive with South Park Drive leading from the southerly tip to the A583 road.

Within the park there are four zones which are loosely separated into north and western formal gardens; the eastern area has a lake and woodland area and the south of the park contains children's play areas and sports facilities.

The park area is Grade II* registered and is on the Register of Historic Parks and Gardens of special historic interest in England. The park is owned and managed by Blackpool Council. It achieved the Green Flag Award in 2008, which it has continued to hold in subsequent years. On 29 November 2017 Stanley Park was announced as the winner of the 2017 Fields in Trust UK's Best Park, as voted by YOU! award, having topped the public vote.

The park is open every day of the year between dawn and dusk; the public are alerted to exit the park via a horn sound 15 minutes before closing. It is estimated that the park receives over two million visitors a year.

The park remained the most recent park development in Blackpool until 2006, when George Bancroft Park was opened.

== Features ==
=== Italian gardens and art deco cafe ===
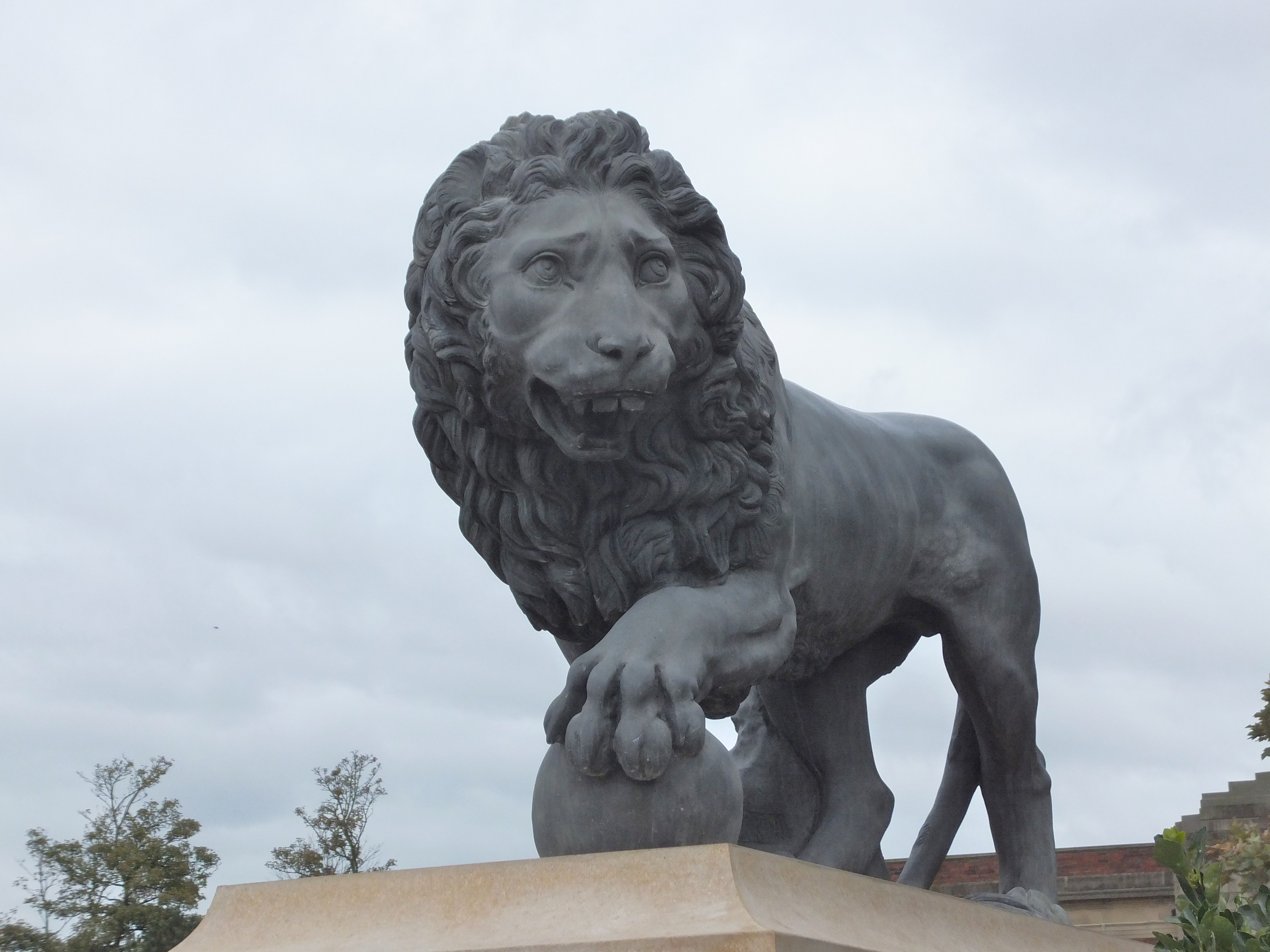
One of the new Medici lion statues

The Italian Garden in the centre of the park has many flower beds and a central fountain made from Italian marble. The fountain and the four surrounding sea horses, were donated by Magee Marshall & Co in 1926. It now has a large number of benches though this was not the case when the park first opened.

At the steps leading to the cafe from the Italian Gardens, there are two Medici lions statues which were produced, by Rupert Harris Conservation, using casts from the former sculptures which were returned, on loan, to Stowe House in 2013. The original lions, and shepherds and shepherdesses (probably from the Grecian valley, after 1749), were donated by John Magee in 1926 after being purchased during the sale of Stowe House in 1921. Three of the Four Shepherd statues in the Italian Gardens were stolen, probably for scrap metal, in 2011 which prompted Blackpool Council to ensure the safety of the lions. There were a number of vandal attacks on the statues and so an agreement was formed for the lease of the Lions to Stowe House. In return for the loan Stanley Park received exact copies (but with steel armature), new plinths and secured free access for Blackpool residents at Stowe House. In 2014, the Italian Gardens received four new statues which were purchased by the council to replace the shepherd and shepherdesses. The second hand granite statues were bought from a reclamation yard and they represent the four seasons.

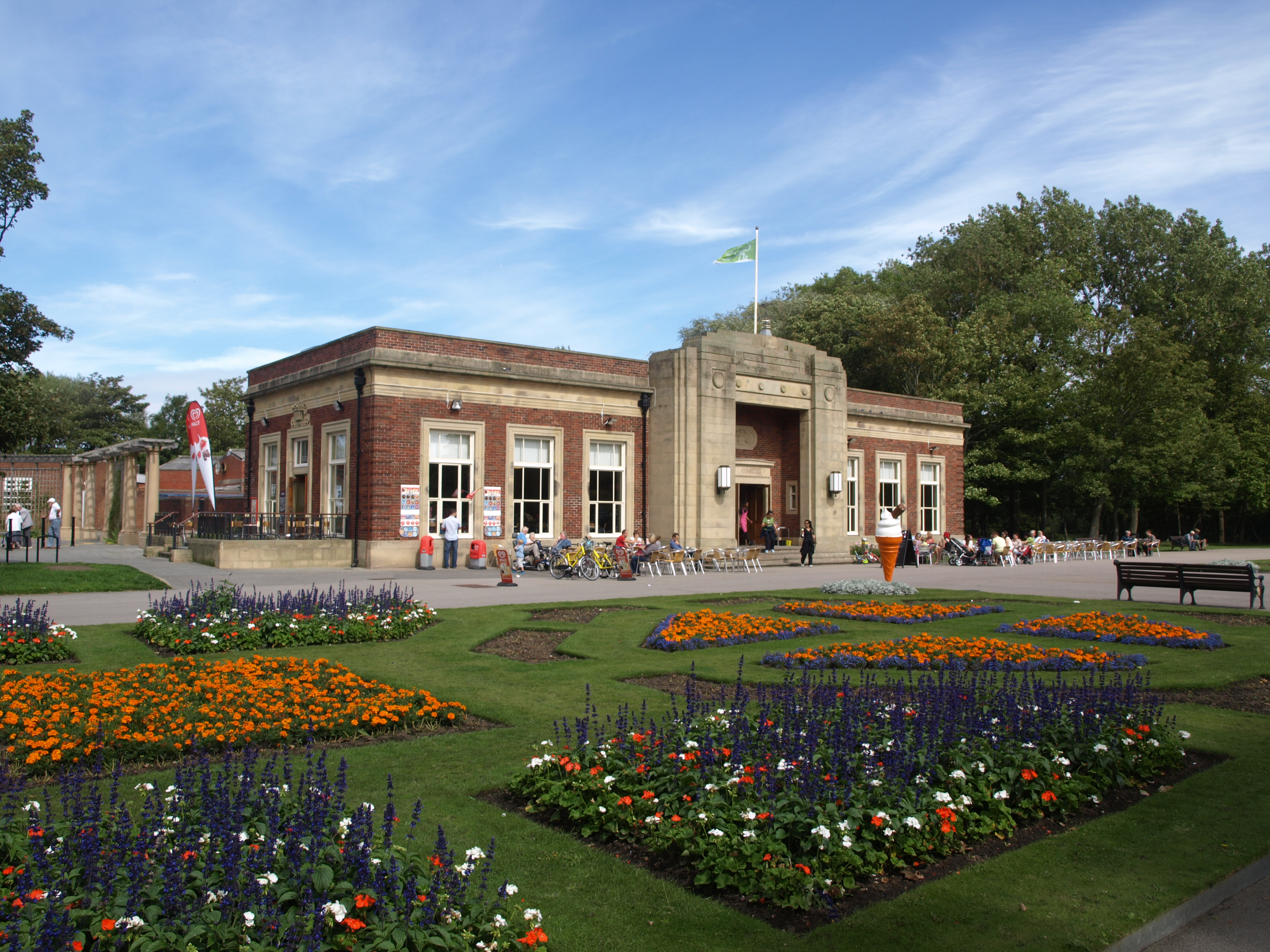
Café

Initial designs, for the art deco cafe, outlined a four-storey social centre which was designed to look like a country mansion. Due to financial strains this was re-designed, as it now stands, as a cafe in an art deco style which was designed to appear larger than it was. The cafe is constructed from brick with sandstone features and has mahogany doors and steel framed windows

The cafe, "Parks" is licensed to sell alcohol and holds a number of musical events including a regular afternoon tea dance for Blackpool Carers.

=== Lake and surroundings ===
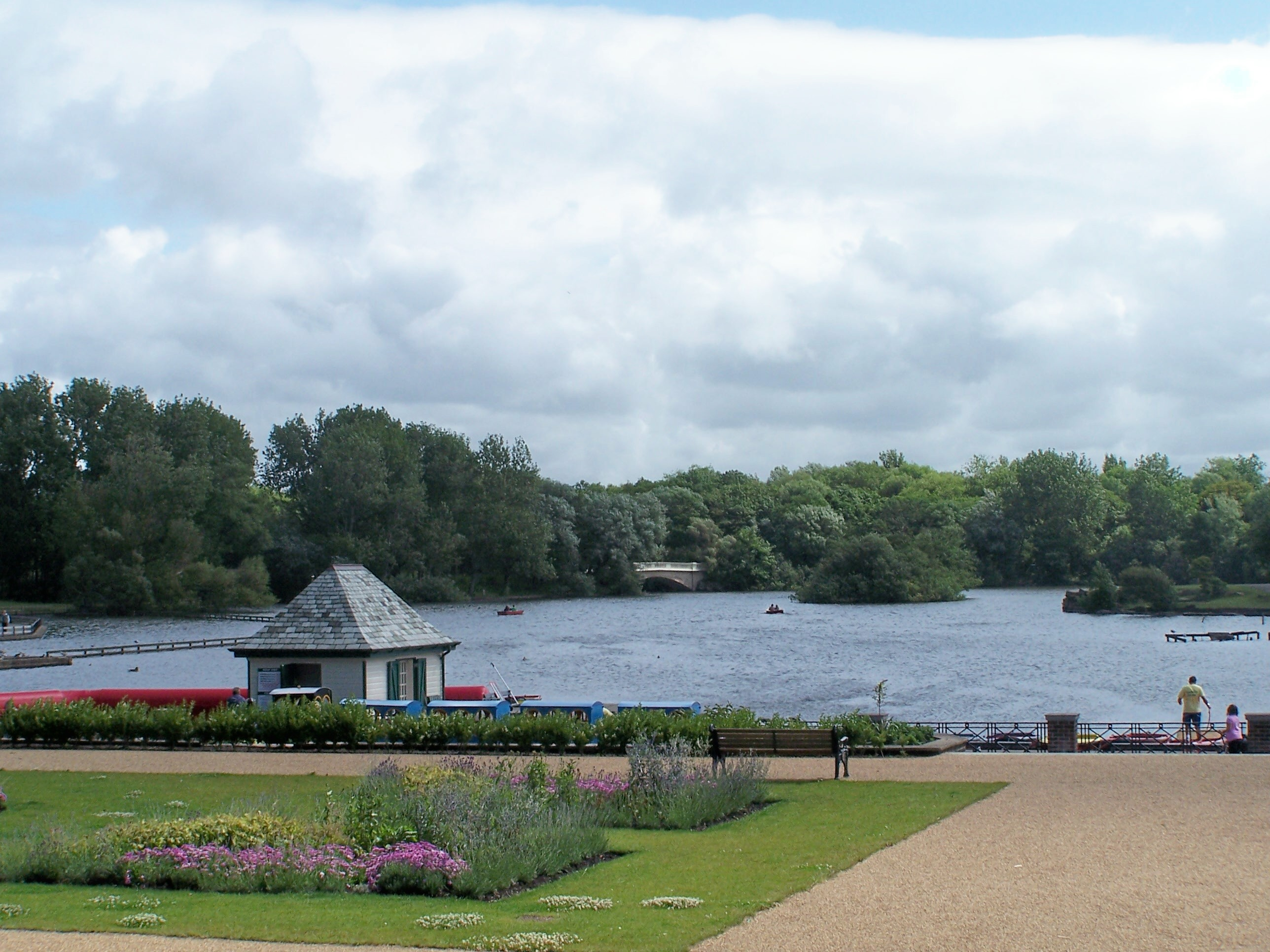
View across boating lake

The lake covers around 22 acres and was created using a natural depression and imported rock to prevent erosion. There is a central island in the lake which can be accessed by two stone bridges. The lake's tourist boating previously consisted of rowing boats and canoes though is now popular with motorboats and pedalos. An old Blackpool, oar propelled, lifeboat, The Samuel Fletcher, was previously used as a pleasure cruiser on the lake. Boathouses were built in 1935 next to the lake. These consist of a 2-storey structure with two adjacent single storey buildings which contain an ice-cream kiosk and equipment storage

Crossing the lake are two Italianate style stone bridges built between 1926 and 1933 The lake is regularly used by fishermen though this has previously caused debate regarding the safety of wildfowl.

At the edge of the lake is a "classic temple" style bandstand, surrounded by amphitheatre style seating. This was specifically located to use the acoustics of sound travelling across the lake. The bandstand was also designed by Mawson and was opened on 1 July 1929. It features an Entablature and has a copper roof. The nearby steps are intended to seat an audience of 2,500 people.

Near the lake, there is "trim trail" facility which provides outdoor exercise equipment.

In 1927, the lake was covered by 8 cm (3 inches) of ice which the council embraced and lit the area for late night ice-skating.

=== Cocker clock tower ===
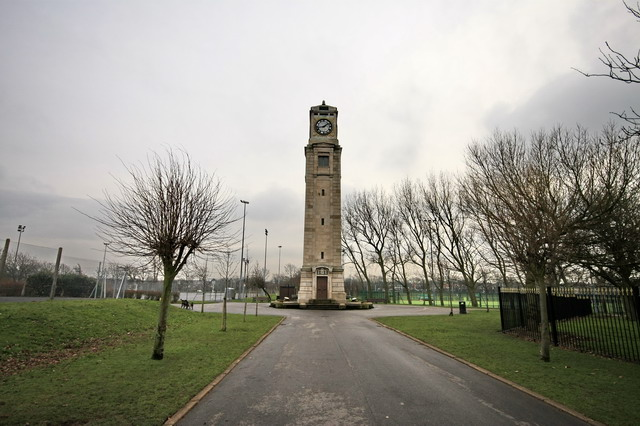
Approach to Cocker clock tower

Mawson proposed a war memorial for the park which led to a competition by the Blackpool Corporation offering a prize of 100 guineas. The winning design was from Lionel Budden of a 26-metre (85 ft) tall clock tower. The name was given as dedication to the first mayor of Blackpool, William Cocker. Built in ashlar, each side faces almost exactly north, east, south and west with the door on the northern side The clock tower encompasses two bronze lion head drinking fountains and a medallion above an inscription. The inscription on the tower reads:

"This tower was erected in the year 1926 the jubilee of the incorporation of the borough of Blackpool in honour of William Henry Cocker esq jpmrcs eng lsa 1st mayor of the borough a man of ideas wide vision and sterling ability Dr Cocker rendered eminent service to the municipality he was elected mayor on six occasions and was a member of the council for 35 years during a long career of unselfish devotion to public duty it was his constant endeavour to increase the popularity of Blackpool as a health and pleasure resort. The jubilee marked the realisation of the wonderful developments/ which he advocated with steadfast faith and confidence"

It used to be possible for visitors to climb the tower for the view until the mid-1970s.

=== Gardens ===
Aside from the Italian gardens there is a rose garden which has two circular man-made ponds with fountains. The rose gardens are surrounded by the hedging of the bowling greens.

=== Tearoom and tennis pavilion ===
In a bungalow style of the inter-war era the building has had multiple uses such as facilitating tennis equipment hire and as a tearoom. The building is now used as a Police and Community Support Centre which is used by constables, special constables and police community support officers (PCSO's).

=== Visitor centre ===
The Visitors' centre opened in August 2005 by the 19th Earl of Derby. It was a result of £100,000 investment from the National Lottery Fund and has provided an office for the Friends of Stanley Park who have now taken over the management of the building.

=== Conservatory ===
Originally there were 1.2 hectares (3 acres) of conservatories but this was replaced by a 38-by-6-metre (125 ft × 20 ft) aluminium and glass structure in the 1970s. The glasshouses grew the plants for Blackpools parks and had three sections (temperate, tropical and potted plants). This was previously run in partnership with Myerscough College but due to financial constraints their support was withdrawn in 2009/2010. Soon after, the building was deemed structurally unsafe, in part due to vandalism, and therefore was demolished in 2012 to make way for a car park.

=== Children's play area ===
The play areas within the park have been renovated many times and currently have a £110,000 animal farm themed play area which is suitable for 2-8 year olds. It has a number of attractions including: rocking horses, see saws, slides, climbing frames, swings, roundabouts, interactive surfboard, rota web, play vehicle and 3D spring ride-ons. A 30-year-old climbing frame train has been restored as part of the renovations as well as installing new seating areas. There is also a timber framed adventure playground, which was constructed in 2011 using £300,000 investment, for older children.

== Sport ==
=== Original provisions ===
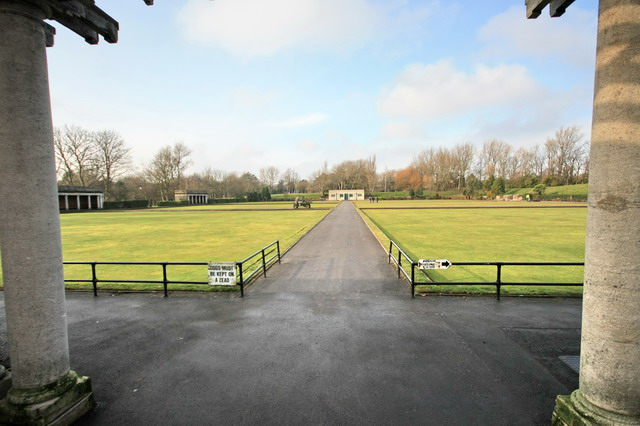
View across the bowling greens

The tennis courts were in use before the official opening of the park, as early as 1924 and were reported to have 24 hard and 16 grass courts.

Again, the bowling greens were in use before the official opening of the park, as early as 1924 The park hosts six bowling greens: four crown and two flat. There are a number of buildings associated with the greens such as the Bowling Club House, Flat Green Bowling Club and Crown Green Booking Office, changing rooms, public toilets and two bowling green shelters. The greens are regularly used by the Blackpool Bowling Club

=== Subsequent additions ===
Constructed in 1987, and updated in 2008, the all-weather pitches host a number of sports including five-a-side football, hockey, and basketball matches. For hockey, there are three astroturf pitches and two grass pitches at the park. The Blackpool Hockey Club are based at Stanley Park and they have three senior men's teams, three senior women's teams, and one junior boys team. In 2008 the club gained the England Hockey's ClubsFirst accreditation. There is an annual Blackpool Hockey Festival held on the sports pitches which has been at Stanley Park since it was organised by Warrington banker manager, George Greaves, in 1952. The park has space and facilities to support football and rugby matches on grass fields

In 2011 a national standard BMX track was opened at Stanley Park. The track is home to a local club: Blackpool BMX club which has members who have won competitions at international level. The club was given funding from funded by Blackpool Council, British Cycling, NHS Blackpool and Cycling England. Dylan Clayton, a bronze medal world champion, assisted with training and publicising BMX riding to local schools

The park also has two putting greens, miniature golf, table tennis, trampolines and a skate park for visitor use.

=== Athletics arena ===
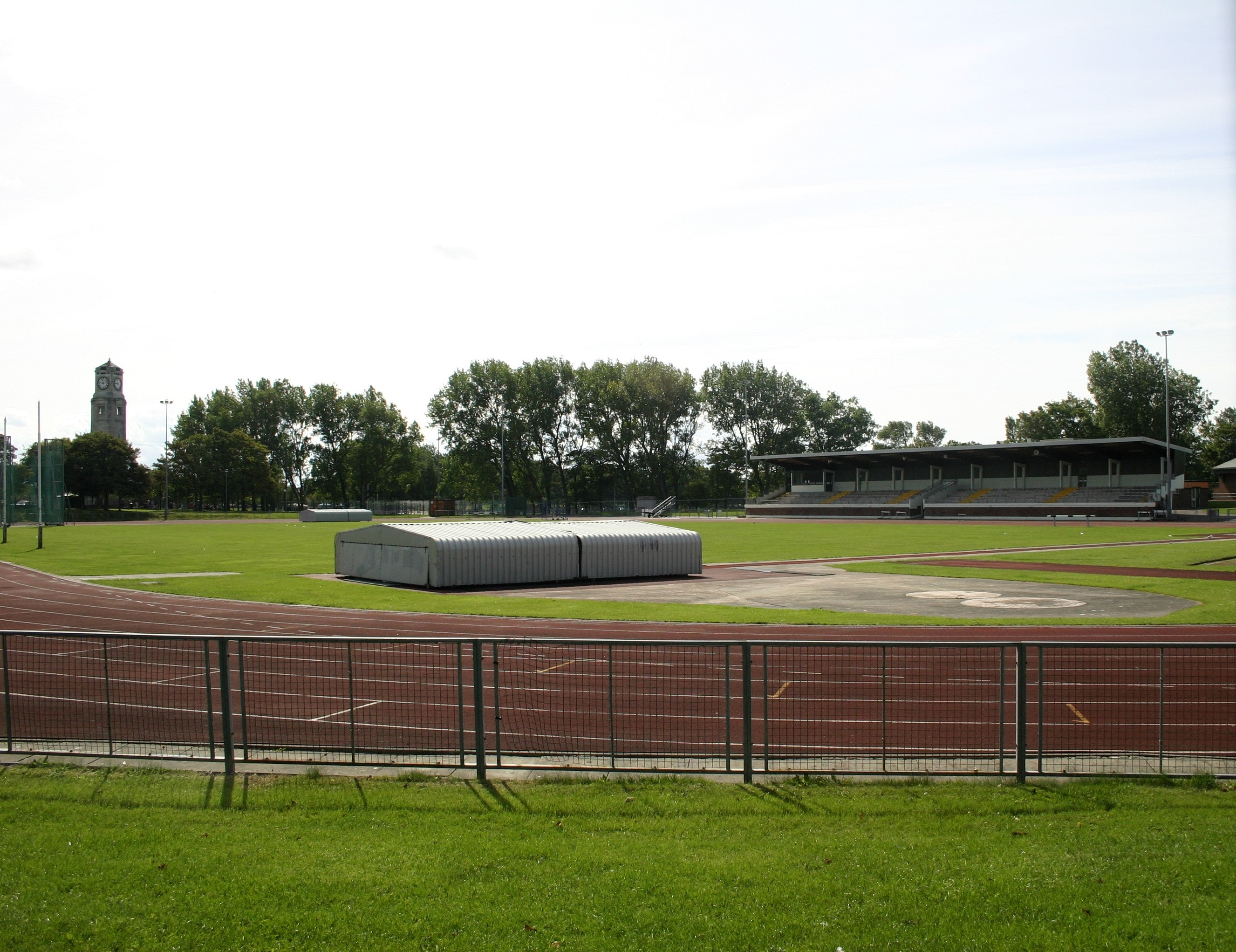
The Athletics track at Stanley Park Blackpool

The oval cinder track built in the 1960s was upgraded in 1987 to a synthetic track with floodlights. The arena houses an "eight-lane outdoor synthetic track, 60-metre (66 yd) 6 lane indoor synthetic track, full range of field event facilities, UK Athletics-qualified coaches, covered stand with seating for over 300 spectators, Clubhouse and changing rooms with disabled provisions". The arena is regularly used by local schools on summer sports days.

Blackpool F.C., the town's professional football club, had its home at the athletic grounds on the same site between 1897 and 1899, prior to moving to its current Bloomfield Road address.

Blackpool, Wyre and Fylde Athletic Club has a club house at the track. They offer training and competitions in track and field, cross country, and road relays.

=== Cricket ground ===
Stanley Park
- Interactive map of Stanley Park
- Former names: Whitegate Park
- Capacity: 8,000
- Surface: Grass
Stanley Park
- Interactive map of Stanley Park
Ground information
- Location: Blackpool, Lancashire
- Country: England
- Home club: Blackpool CC
- County club: Lancashire
- Establishment: 1924; 102 years ago
- End names
- Pavilion End; Nursery End
International information
- First women's Test: 26 June 1937: England v Australia
- Last women's Test: 3 July 1986: England v India
- First women's ODI: 26 August 2007: England v New Zealand
- Last women's ODI: 27 August 2007: England v New Zealand
Team information
Lancashire	(1905–2025)
Lancashire Women	(2007)
Lancashire Thunder	(2016–2019)
North West Thunder	(2023–2024)
- As of 22 June 2025; Source: CricketArchive, Cricinfo

The cricket ground was in place before the development of Stanley Park but was remodelled as part of the plans and was previously known as the Whitegate Park. The Whitegate park had encompassed a horse racing track, football field and cricket ground but by the early 1920s the Whitegate site no longer hosted other sports therefore it was decided the site would be dedicated to Blackpool Cricket Club. Due to being within the boundary, it was renamed Stanley Park in 1925.

In 1925 a £4,500 brick pavilion was built and coincidentally the wooden one was destroyed by fire in the same year. Sir Lindsay Parkinson donated the ground, valued at £10,000 to the club shortly before it was renamed Stanley Park. The ground is managed by Blackpool Cricket Club and the deeds are held in trust by the mayor. 1935 saw a ladies pavilion and an extension built to the existing stand in an attempt to encourage more county games to be held at the ground.

During the war, the RAF used the grounds for training though games were still played there. County games continued from 1946 until 1984 in which time Lancashire suffered their first defeat at the ground. The original wooden seating has been replaced by concrete bankings and plastic seats; the changing rooms and the facade of the pavilion has been updated. The facility has seating for 5000 visitors and covers 34,714 square yards. It continues to facilitate local and county games.

The competitive hobby of slot car racing has a group based in the scout huts at the Cricket Ground.

=== Golf course ===
At the time of opening in 1926, it was perceived that golf was necessary for any resort which wished to attract middle class visitors. Alister MacKenzie designed the golf course for the park and he reported that the 21 ha (51 acres) he was originally given to plan was not sufficient for the quality course he would have liked. Therefore, the council purchased a further 20 ha (50 acres) and he was then able to plan the 18 hole course that exists today. A clubhouse was added in 1935; prior to this the art deco cafe (pavilion building) served as the golf house. It is the home of Blackpool Park Golf Club.

=== Blackpool Sports Centre ===
On the site of the park nurseries, the Blackpool Sports Centre was built in 1996. The sports hall is able to host many sports including badminton, table tennis and 5-a-side football as well as a 60-metre (66 yd) indoor running track. There is an indoor climbing wall, a bouldering room and studios for fitness, exercise classes and spinning. There are 4 outdoor all-weather pitches and 6 netball courts.

=== Running ===
A parkrun takes place in the park every Saturday morning.

== Stanley Park conservation area ==
There are two conservation areas within Blackpool; one around the Town Hall and the other around Stanley Park. The conservation area includes Stanley Park's bordering houses.

=== Shrine of Our Lady of Lourdes ===
The Shrine of Our Lady of Lourdes is a chapel within the Stanley Park conservation area and was built in 1955–7. The shrine is situated on Whinney Heys Road, Blackpool. It was designated by English Heritage as a Grade II* listed building, and is under the care of the Historic Chapels Trust. Locally it has been known as the "white church".

== Attractions ==
Stanley Park is home to several attractions, including the Miniature Golf course and Model Village.

=== Model Village ===
In the 1960s a private investor opened a miniature building attraction which is set within 1 hectare (2.5 acres) of gardens. There are a range of miniature models ranging from castles to many types of small villages. In 2011, lead was stolen from the roof tiles on the miniature houses and the owners reported that hand-made figures were often stolen.

== Events ==
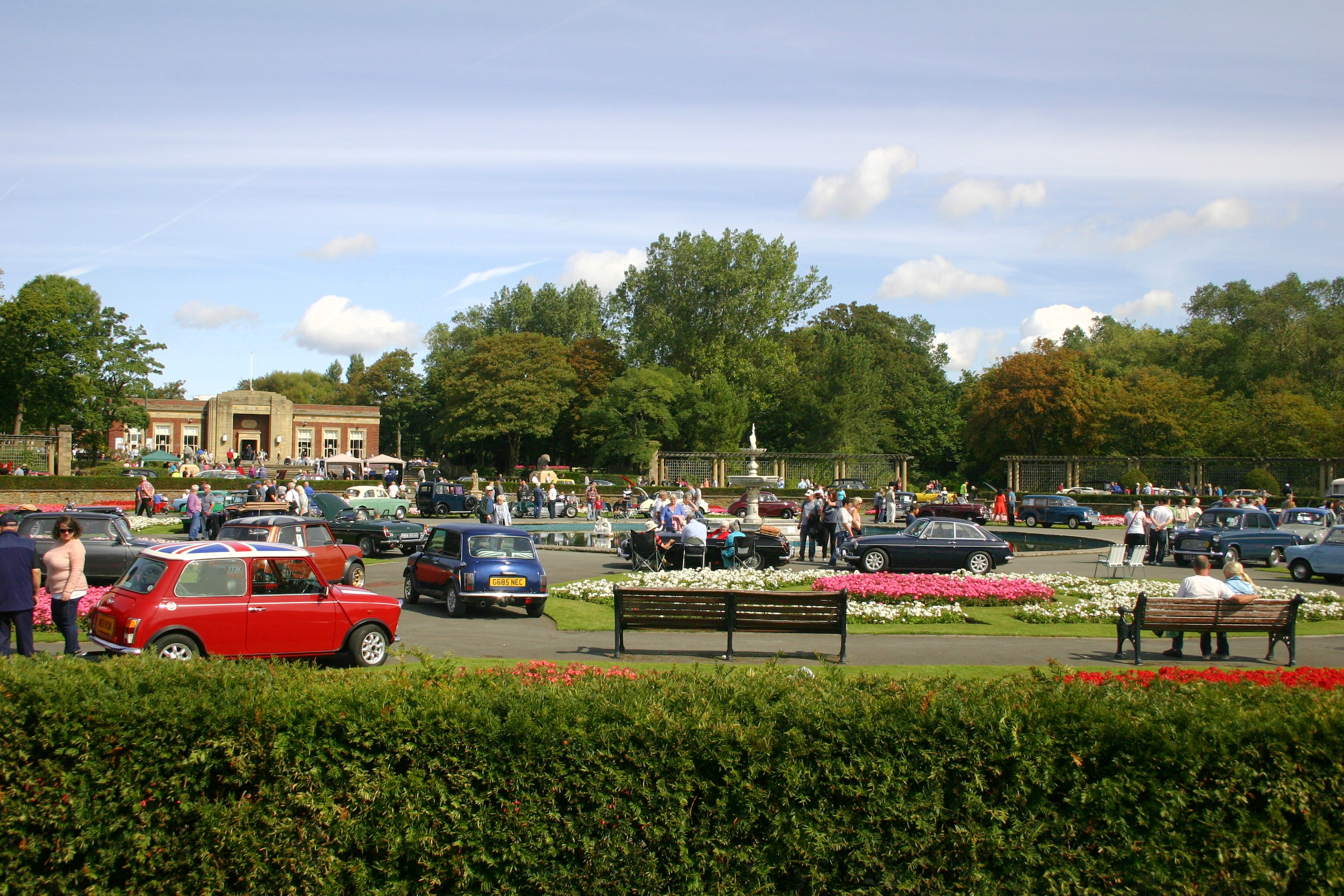
Stanley Park hosts a classic car show

The Friends of Stanley Park host a variety of events at the park throughout the year including music concerts at the bandstand and vehicle events in the Italian Gardens.

- In 1928, Blackpool Stanley Park first hosted the L.M.S railway Northern District Horticultural society show. The show, patronised by the Earl of Lonsdale, continued annually and attracted 5,000 entries in 1933 and in 1937 there were 3,500 exhibits with over 10,000 people attending the event. To accommodate the large number of visitors, special trains were put on, to transport people from across northern England including Shropshire and Yorkshire.
- In 1932, 2000 people battled a thunderstorm to witness the Blackburn's Steelworks Band perform at the bandstand in the park.
- In 1939, the parks committee allowed annual shows for the Blackpool horse, pony and sheepdog society and the Marton, Blackpool and district agricultural and horticultural society to be held at the park due to their usual venue (Squires Gate) being used by the Air Ministry. The horticultural society attracted over 2000 entries to the show.
- In 1950, the park hosted the British Showjumping Association's National Championships with a prize of £7,000.
- In 1951, the park hosted the 'News Chronicles' second 'stage and radio garden party' in which 300 artists performed.
- 1952 saw the first annual Easter hockey festival held at Stanley Park.
- In 2009, Stanley Park hosted Disability Sport Events, Nationwide Junior Athletics Championships.
- In 2009, the park hosted start of the 4th stage of the Tour of Britain.

== Ecology ==
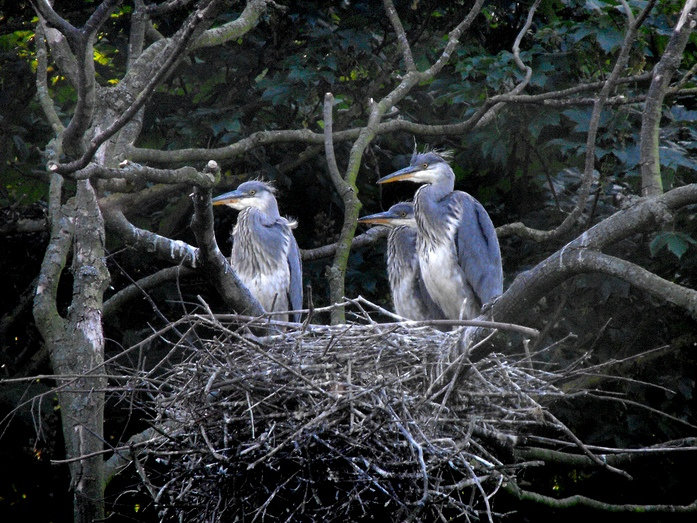
Grey herons nesting over Stanley Park boating lake

The 0.12 ha (0.30-acre) northern island within the lake has, since 1993, held Lancashire County Biological Heritage Site status due to its heron nesting population. In 1993, there were seven active nests which increased to 43 in 2007. A variety of other birds can be sighted at the park including; the treecreeper, nuthatch, great spotted woodpecker, tawny owl and garden birds such as the great tit, blue tit, robin, and more recently rose-ringed parakeets (not normally indigenous to Blackpool). Waterfowl, including mute swans, great crested grebes, geese, moorhens, tufted ducks, shovelers and coots are also regularly sighted at the park.

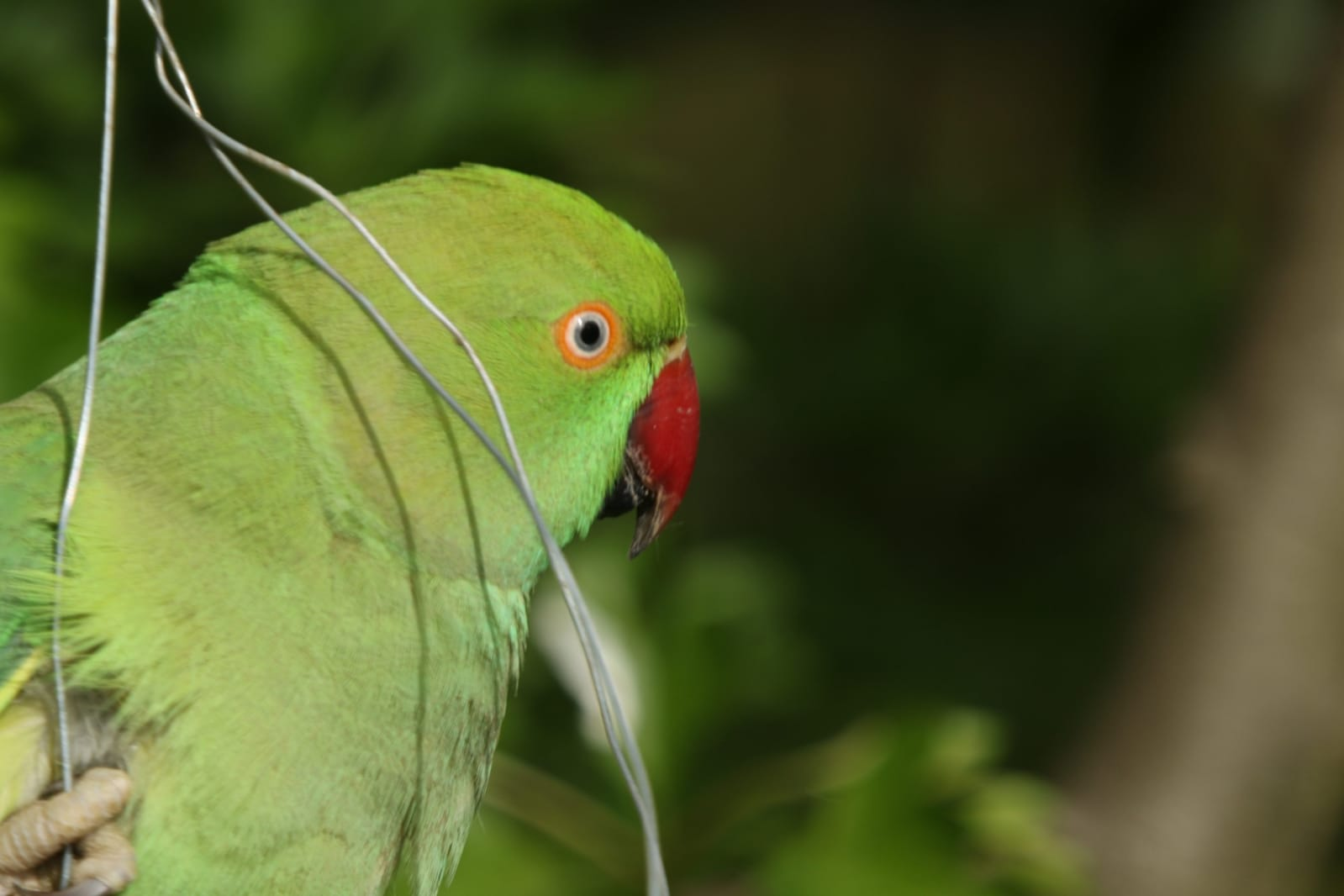
Rose-ringed Parakeet

Blackpool's Countryside Experience, which includes Salisbury Woodland, Heron's Reach and Marton Mere Local Nature Reserve allows plants and animals to transverse between sites. The park has many native and non- native trees including the common oak, ash, willow, sycamore, holly and hawthorn. In 2003, an outbreak of Dutch elm disease resulted in the removal of elm trees within the park. Stanley Park is home to many mammals such as grey squirrels, hedgehogs and foxes.

== Accessibility ==
The park has sixteen entrances including the main entrance which is accessible for vehicles. There are free car parks and on-street parking surrounding the park. Cyclists, pushchairs and disabled visitors have been catered for and all the buildings are accessible via ramps and dropped kerbs. There is only one road which has access within the park perimeter (Mawson Drive) which leads to a parking area with easy access to the art deco cafe and visitor centre.

== Other Blackpool natural spaces ==
- Bispham Rock Gardens
- George Bancroft Park, Blackpool
- Kincraig Lake Ecological Reserve
- Kingscote Park, Blackpool
- Moor Park, Blackpool
- Salisbury Woodland Gardens, Blackpool
