= Kincraig Lake Ecological Reserve =

Wildlife reserve in Lancashire, England

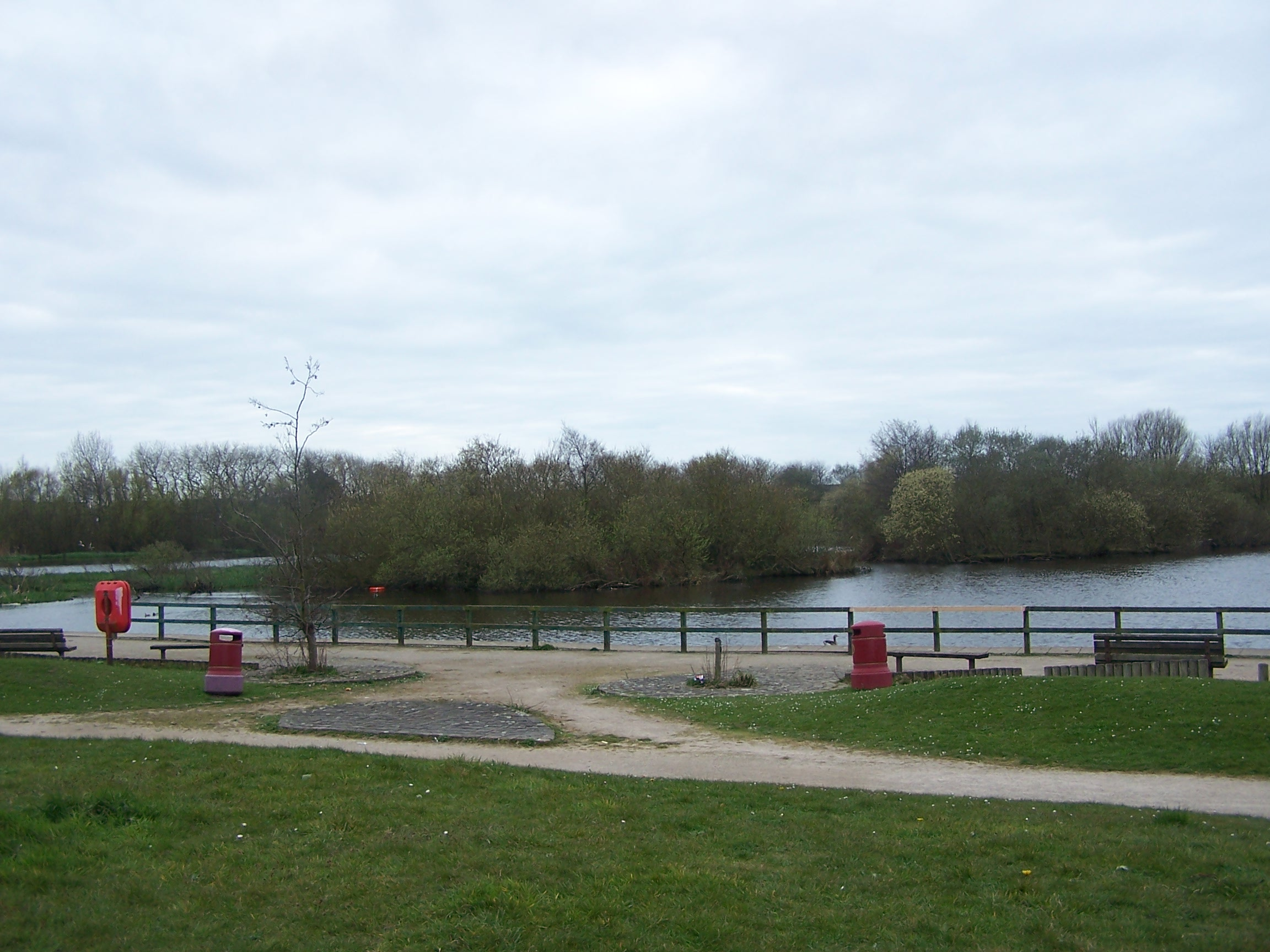
- Kincraig Lake, Kincraig Ecological Reserve Bispham

- Location within Blackpool Location within Lancashire
- Location: Blackpool, Lancashire, England
- Coordinates: 53.855°N 3.027°W
- Governing body: Blackpool Council
- Website: Website

Kincraig Lake Ecological Reserve (also known as Kooky Ponds and Kinell Pond) is a wildlife reserve located in Bispham in Blackpool on the Fylde coast, Lancashire, England. It is owned by Blackpool Council.

== History ==
The site was originally a marl pit, excavated in the 1890s for fertiliser and surrounded by open farmland.

Kincraig Lake Ecological Reserve is one of fourteen Biological Heritage Sites (BHS) in Blackpool. A BHS provides a refuge for rare and threatened plants and animals.

== Wildlife ==
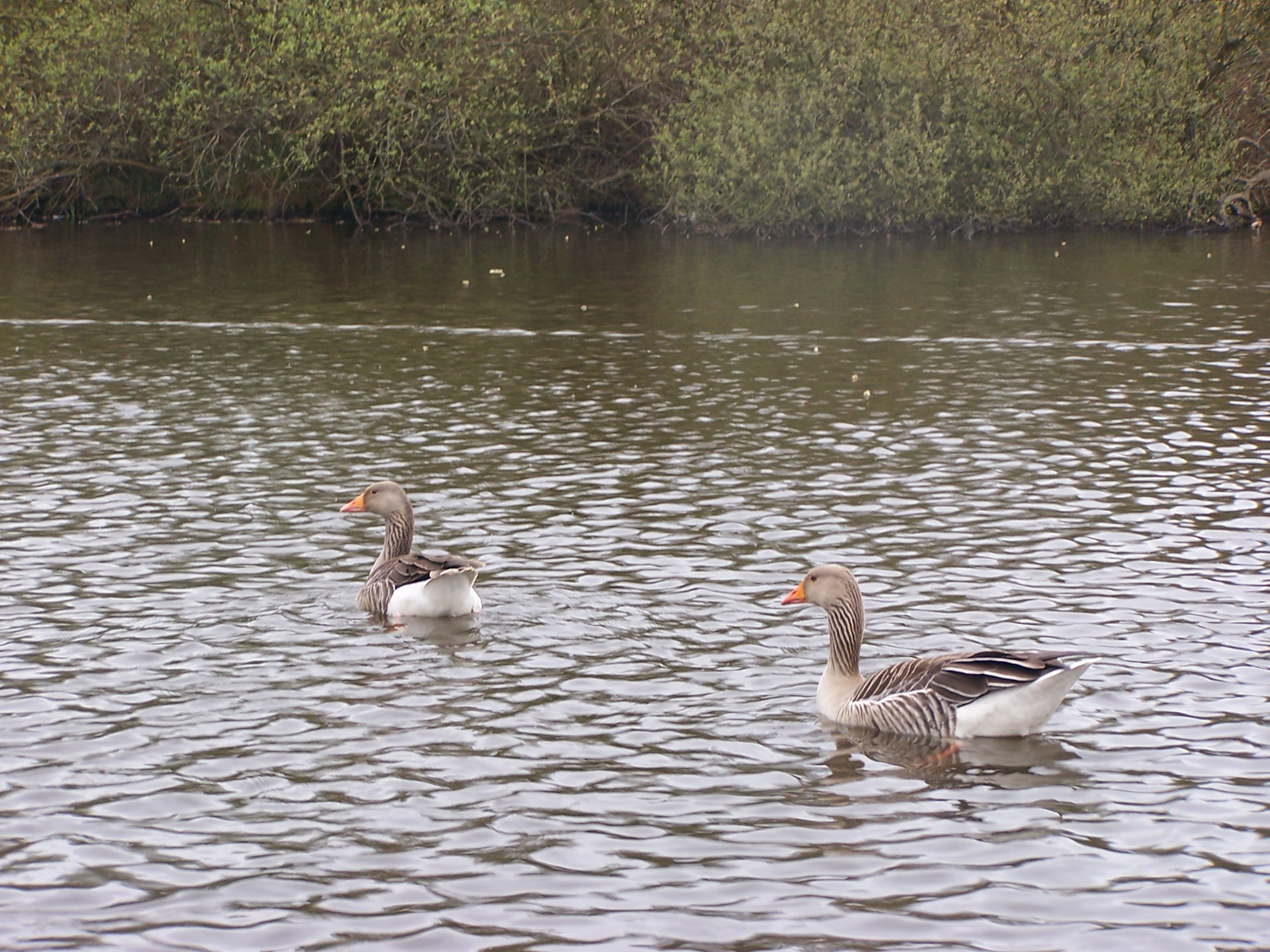
Greylag geese on Kincraig Lake

There is a variety of wildlife seen at the reserve. In winter 2007 the local Fylde Bird Club organised a Christmas Bird Hunt around the Fylde and recorded the following birds at Kincraig Lake – grey heron, mallard, mute swan, Canada geese, shoveler, teal, mallard, coot, moorhen, sparrowhawk, little grebe, starling, magpie, long-tailed tit, snipe, grey wagtail, greylag geese, black-headed gull, goldcrest, blue tit, gadwall, tufted duck, great crested grebe and great spotted woodpecker.

Since then Fylde Bird Club have recorded additional birds at the lake including, great cormorant, European goldfinch, kingfisher and water rail

== Friends of Kincraig Lake ==
In January 2008 a new "Friends of Kincraig Lake" group was set up by local residents to help restore the wetland back to its former glory, following years of tipping, vandalism and neglect. The group's first priority being to repair the footpaths which circumnavigate the entire lake at a cost of about £10,000, which would improve disabled access to the lake. The group's first meeting was held on 29 January at the local community centre in nearby Stronsay Place. As well making a priority improvements to the footpaths it was also agreed to beginning regular "litter picks", and to hold monthly Friends meetings. On 11 February it was revealed that Blackpool Probation Service has offered to send teams to clear out debris at two small ponds in the area, Kilmory Place pond and Dumfries Place pond. Also the priorities for the Friends include new footpaths, signs and repairs to benches with the main priority being to see the footpaths upgraded to improve access to, and around, the lake. On 12 April 2008 the Friends group organised a litter pick which was attended by local MP, Joan Humble and they removed nearly one tonne of litter and fly-tipping from around the lake. As part of the National Moth Night, the Friends organised a moth recording event for 7 June.

== Ashfield pond and local area ==
There are a number of ponds of various sizes in the surrounding area including Ashfield pond (53.8582°N 3.0286°W), Dumfries Place pond (53.8525°N 3.0236°W) and Kilmory Place pond (53.8536°N 3.0241°W) as well as ponds on Robins Lane.

Ashfield pond, which is located to the north of Ashfield Road by Blackpool and The Fylde College Bispham campus. The Heritage Lottery Fund gave a grant of £22,800 to the Kincraig Pond Heritage Group and the Kincraig Neighbourhood Play Steering Group as part of a Community Heritage Project for the local area and Ashfield pond. The projects aim being to "restore the pond and surrounding area, research and record history of the local area, promote a greater awareness amongst local residents of the historical and environmental value of the local area." In 2006 the Kincraig Neighbourhood Play Steering Group received a £25,000 grant from the British Governments Living Spaces programme toward restoration work on Ashfield pond and the surrounding area as well as toward replanting to preserve the natural habitats for plants and animal species. Partly funded also by Blackpool Council and the local Residents Association, a new viewing platform was erected by Ashfield pond.

Dumfries Place pond is part of an ecological area within 3-acre (12,000 m^{2}) Kincraig Business Park which opened in summer 2008 and has an adjoining ecological area including the pond as well as 0.7 acres (2,800 m^{2}) set aside purely for wildlife.

== Gallery ==
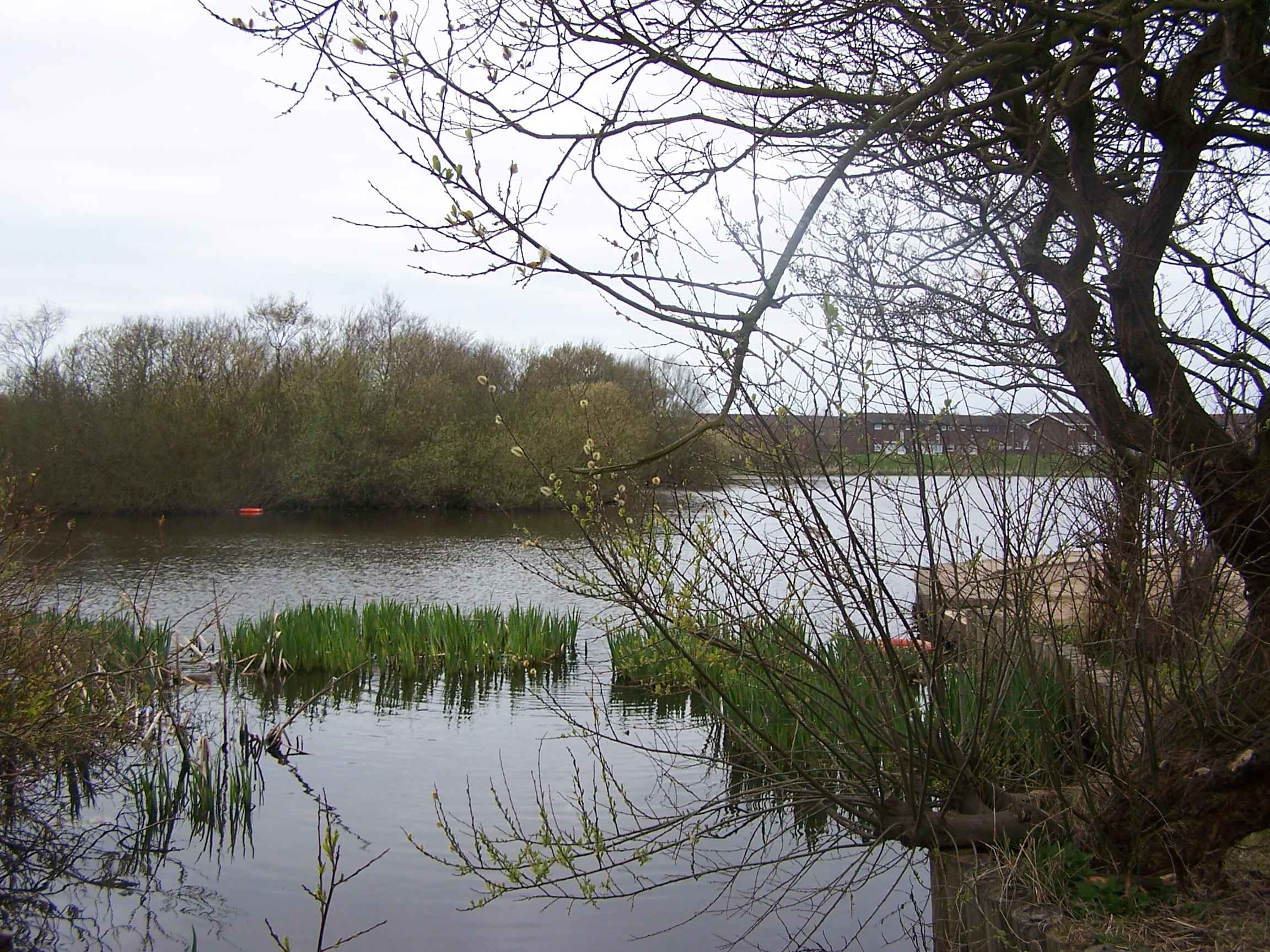
A view of part of the lake showing part of one island

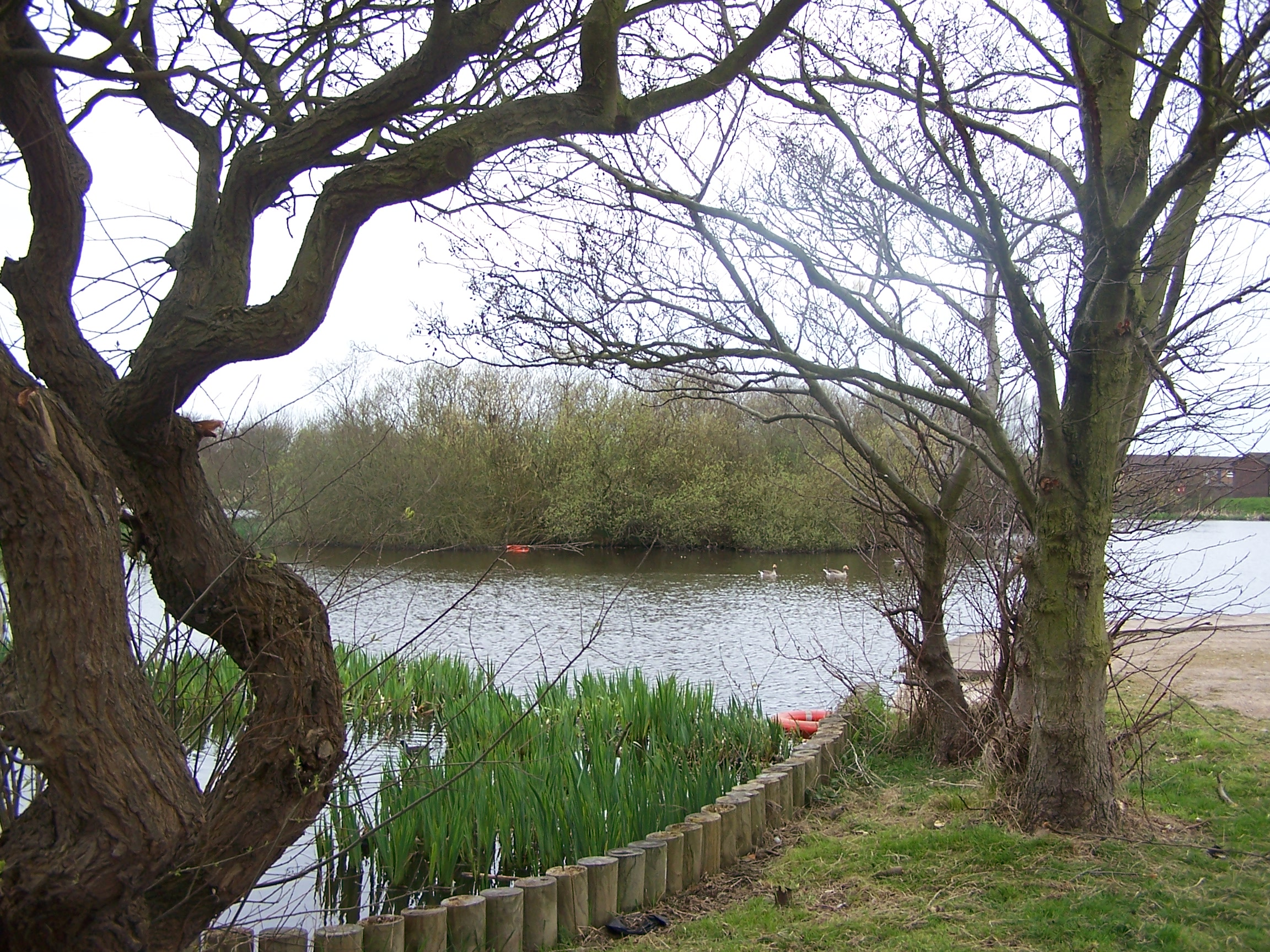
Another view of part of the lake showing one of the islands

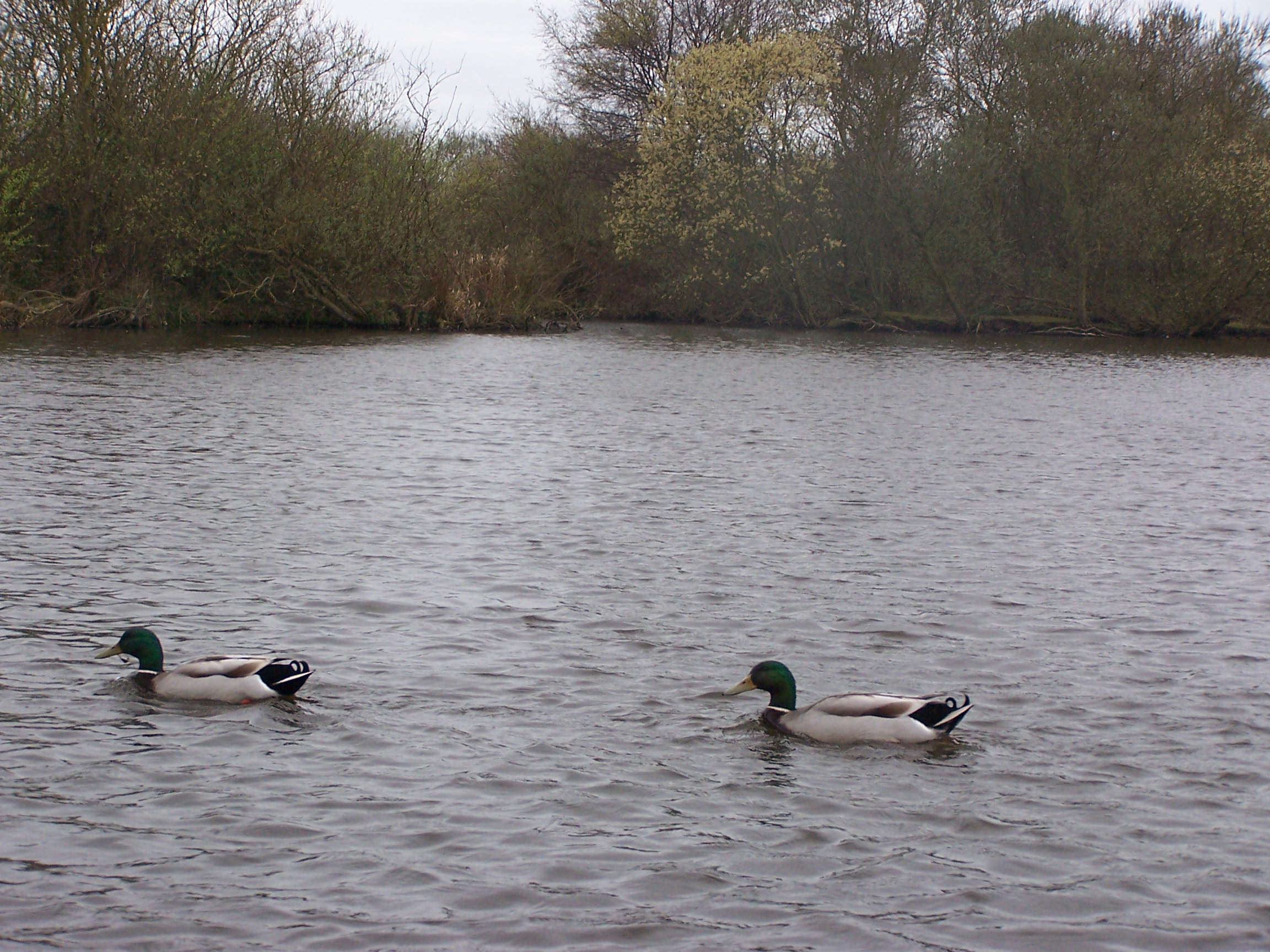
Two mallard drakes swimming on the lake

== See also ==
- Bispham Rock Gardens
- George Bancroft Park, Blackpool
- Kingscote Park, Blackpool
- Moor Park, Blackpool
- Salisbury Woodland Gardens, Blackpool
- Stanley Park, Blackpool
