= Bispham Rock Gardens =

Park in Blackpool, England

Devonshire Road Rock Gardens
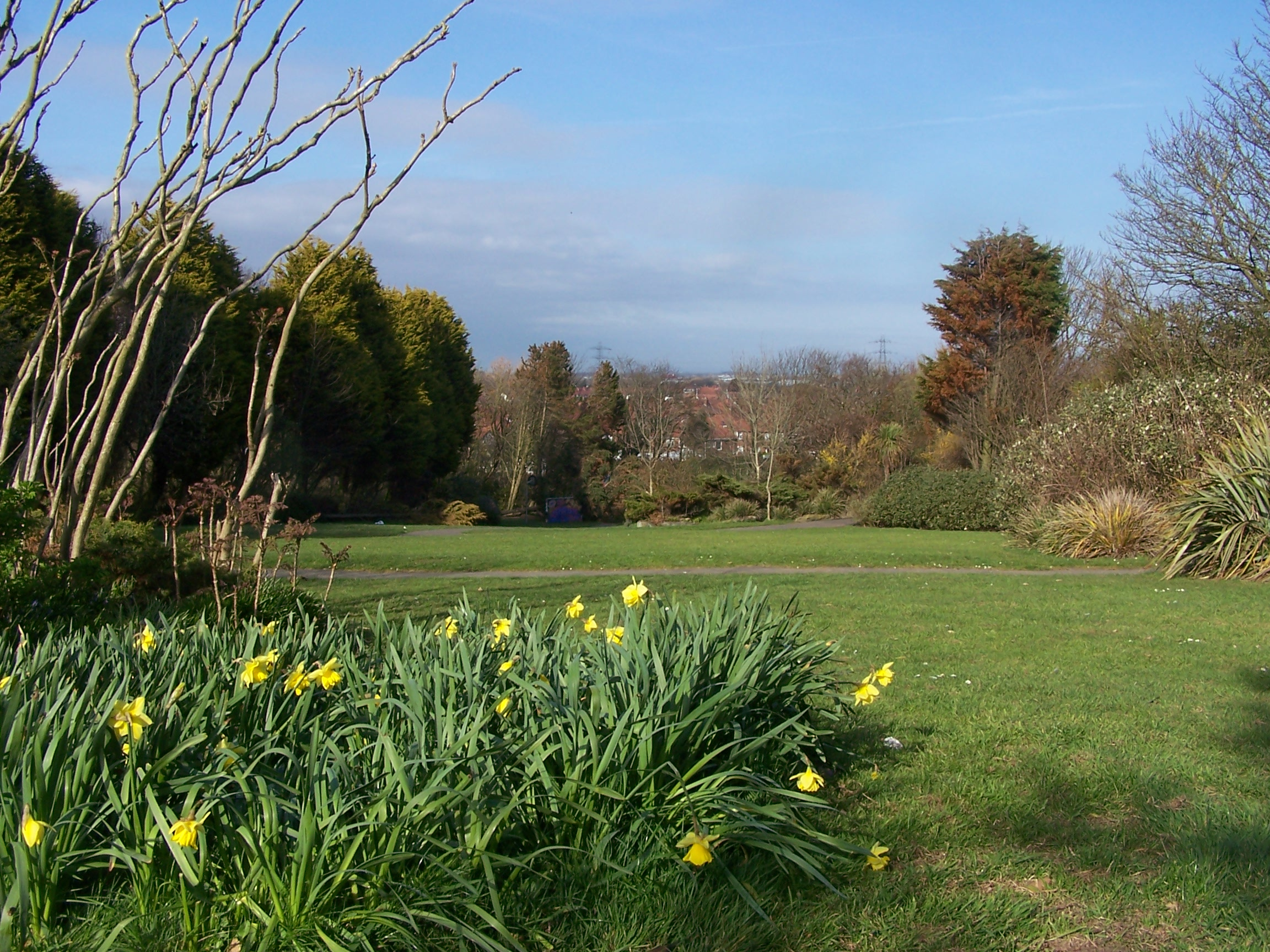
- The Rock Gardens, Bispham

- Location within Blackpool Location within Lancashire
- Interactive map of Devonshire Road Rock Gardens
- Type: Public park
- Location: Bispham, Blackpool, Lancashire, England
- Coordinates: 53.8493°N 3.0404°W
- Created: 190?
- Operator: Blackpool Council
- Open: All year

Devonshire Road Rock Gardens or the Rock Gardens, is a municipal park located in Bispham, Blackpool on the Fylde coast in Lancashire, England. The gardens are an important wildlife resource and contains a number of rare species.

The main entrance to the gardens is at the top of Knowle Hill on Devonshire Road. Built upon the site of Beryl Hill (A Celtic name meaning Hill, Hill, Hill) which allegedly was the site of a cairn and a beacon to warn of a Napoleonic invasion The gardens run downhill toward Inver Road. Views from the top of the gardens can be seen toward Pendle Hill, Beacon Fell and the Bowland fells.

== History ==
The gardens were founded in the early 1900s, and were opened to the public in 1925. Over the years the gardens fell into disrepair, were vandalised and used less and less by local residents. In 2002 the Friends of the Rock Gardens was formed to improve community access and use of the park; and to restore the park's amenities.

The park has been regularly used for many years as a setting for wedding photography.

== Gardens renovation ==
The Friends group has held fund raising events such as an Easter Extravaganza and a Teddy Bears' Picnic Fun Day, the first of which was held on 31 July 2007 and attracted about 300 people with Guests of Honour being the Mayor of Blackpool, Robert Wynne, and the area's MP, Joan Humble.

The Heritage Lottery Fund gave a grant of £20,000 in May 2006 to help restore the gardens which received a major revamp with the creation of an educational woodland walk and butterfly habitat. The Friends group forged links with local schools who use the park for outdoor projects such as mini-beast and pond studies. Also the Lancashire Wildlife Trust is monitoring the rare white-letter hairstreak butterfly which lives in the gardens. The Woodland Walk is designed to include a story telling ring, disabled friendly winding paths, a sculpture display area and mosaics.

In November 2007 contractors started a project to completely re-lay the gardens paths. The project cost £57,000 with funding coming from various sources, including Blackpool Borough Council, the local area forum and local firms. The project also received a £39,000 grant from The Veolia Environmental Trust under the Landfill Communities Fund. The work on the paths makes them disabled friendly. Also included in the project is a new enclosed "hilly" landscape to provide runners with a challenging workout and grassed paths for light walks.

== See also ==
- George Bancroft Park, Blackpool
- Kincraig Lake Ecological Reserve
- Kingscote Park, Blackpool
- Moor Park, Blackpool
- Salisbury Woodland Gardens, Blackpool
- Stanley Park, Blackpool
- North Blackpool Pond Trail
