= Salisbury Woodland Gardens =

Park in Blackpool, England

Coordinates: 53.818°N 3.013°W

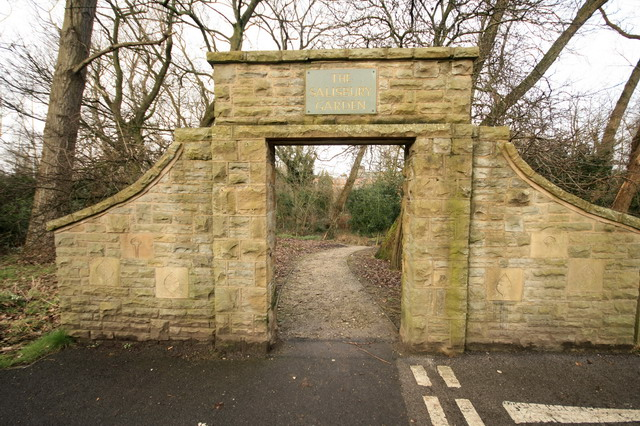
The more recently built entrance to the gardens

Salisbury Woodland Gardens is an open space located in the east of Blackpool, flanked by East Park Drive and Woodside Drive and linking Blackpool Zoo with Stanley Park. Known simply as the 'Woodland Gardens' to local people, the site was acquired in 1924 by Blackpool Corporation and was originally developed as a shelter belt for the adjacent Stanley Park Golf Course. The gardens were later developed in the 1940s as an arboretum and public open space for all to enjoy. It was renovated in 1967 by Peter Perry and his 'Flying Squad (see below). Popular once as a wedding photograph location, the site went into decline during the 1990s. The council's Ranger Service manage and protect the gardens which they took over in September 2006 and have been funding and undertaking the restoration of the woodland. In 1967, Parks Director Norman Leach appointed gardener Pete Perry and his Flying Squad of gardeners to plant up the gardens. All plants, (primulas, meconopsis, etc.) were grown from seed in the greenhouses at Stanley Park, and planted en masse. Extra shrubs, including azalea were also planted.

== History ==
The neighbouring Blackpool Zoo site was formerly Blackpool's municipal airport. In 1927 the local council announced that an aerodrome would be built near Stanley Park, which would become Blackpool Stanley Park Airport offering flights to the Isle of Man. The airport was officially opened by then British Prime Minister, Ramsay MacDonald in 1931. However, with the opening of Squires Gate Airport a decision was made in 1936 by the Ministry of Transport to close the airport at Stanley Park. The airport closed a year later. During the Second World War the airport was used as a Royal Air Force training station, known as No. 3 School of Technical Training. The land that the airport stood on now covers Blackpool Zoo as well as a hotel and golf course. The hangars from the old airport are still in use as the elephant enclosure for the zoo. Evidence of the area's history can also be seen today with the pill box to the east of the gardens.

In April 2007 the local newspaper, the Blackpool Gazette confirmed that the gardens were to receive attention from Blackpool Council's Ranger Service and Arboriculture Service to restore the gardens after years of neglect. The site has been granted special status as a designated County Biological Heritage Site (BHS). A five-year site Management Plan was put in place to assist the long term maintenance of the site, protect wildlife and attract more visitors.

== Landscape and Wildlife ==
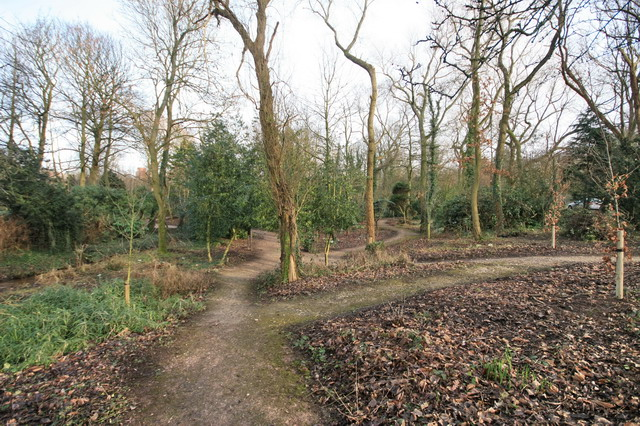
The woodland gardens

The woodland gardens contain many native and exotic trees and shrubs such as magnolia, Caucasian wingnut and maple, enabling the visitor to view the species of many countries within a few acres of land. A number of winding footpaths run through the site and over the ornamental brooks. The site has both local and regional ecological value and was designated as a County Biological Heritage Site in 1993 for its epiphytic flora. A diversity of wildlife can be seen, including kingfishers, treecreepers and woodpeckers. The site also supports colonies of pipistrelle bats, dragonflies and butterflies such as orange tip and peacock.

Woodlands Gardens is one of fourteen Biological Heritage Sites (BHSs) in Blackpool.

== Events ==
A number of guided walks and children's activities are now held in the gardens by the Ranger Service, as part of the council's Park Events Programme. Events such as tree and bulb planting, bird and bat box making are held, as well as talks on trees and history. There are also a number of Volunteering projects and work days occurring on the site to enable the local community to get more involved in the sites management and interpretation.

== See also ==
- Bispham Rock Gardens
- George Bancroft Park, Blackpool
- Kincraig Lake Ecological Reserve
- Kingscote Park, Blackpool
- Moor Park, Blackpool
- Stanley Park, Blackpool
