= Bispham, Blackpool =

Village in Lancashire, England

Coordinates: 53.852°N 3.041°W

Bispham
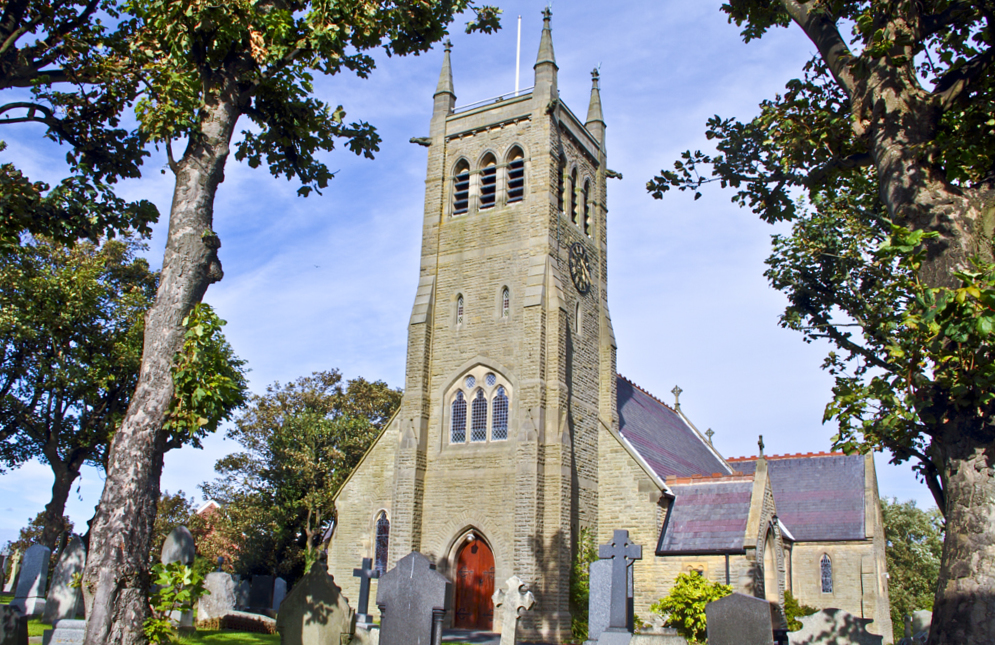
- All Hallows Church

- Location in Blackpool Location within Lancashire
- Population: 20,001 (2011 census)
- OS grid reference: SD309399
- Unitary authority: Blackpool
- Ceremonial county: Lancashire
- Region: North West
- Country: England
- Sovereign state: United Kingdom
- Post town: BLACKPOOL
- Postcode district: FY2
- Dialling code: 01253
- Police: Lancashire
- Fire: Lancashire
- Ambulance: North West
- UK Parliament: Blackpool North and Fleetwood

Bispham /ˈbɪspəm/ is a village on the Fylde coast in the Borough of Blackpool in Lancashire, England.

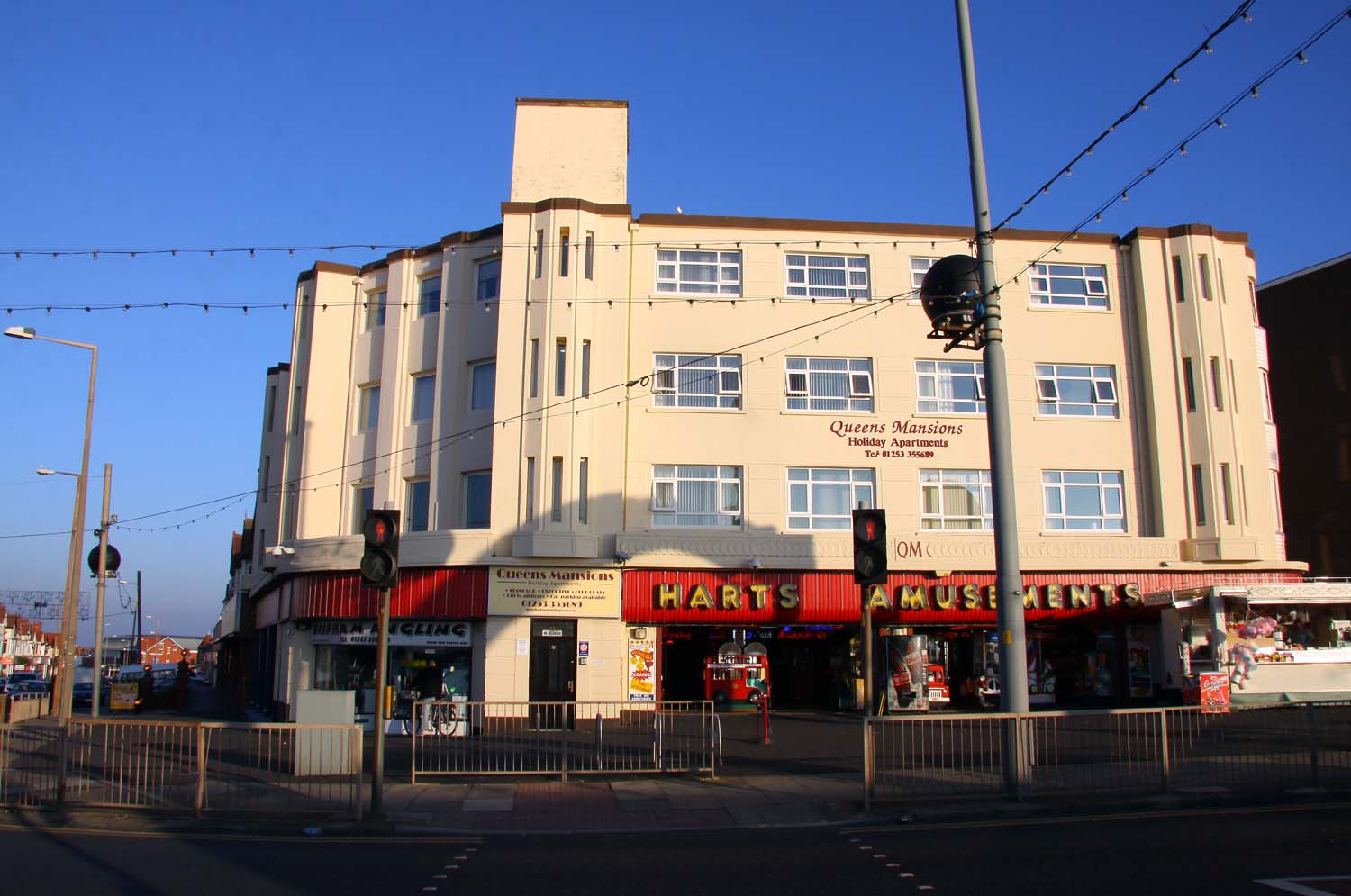
Queens Mansions, Bispham

== Geography and administration ==
The village is part of the borough of Blackpool, and to the south of Bispham is Warbreck, North Shore and Layton, to the east is Carleton and to the north is Norbreck and Thornton Cleveleys and to the west, the Irish Sea. The area is mostly urban. Bispham is in the Blackpool North and Fleetwood parliamentary constituency, whose Member of Parliament is Labour's Lorraine Beavers.

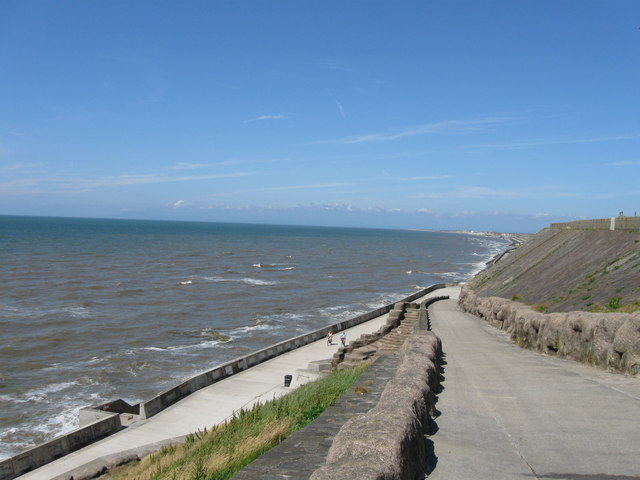
Lancashire Coastal Way, Bispham beachfront

Bispham has three Blackpool Council electoral wards: Bispham, Greenlands and Ingthorpe.

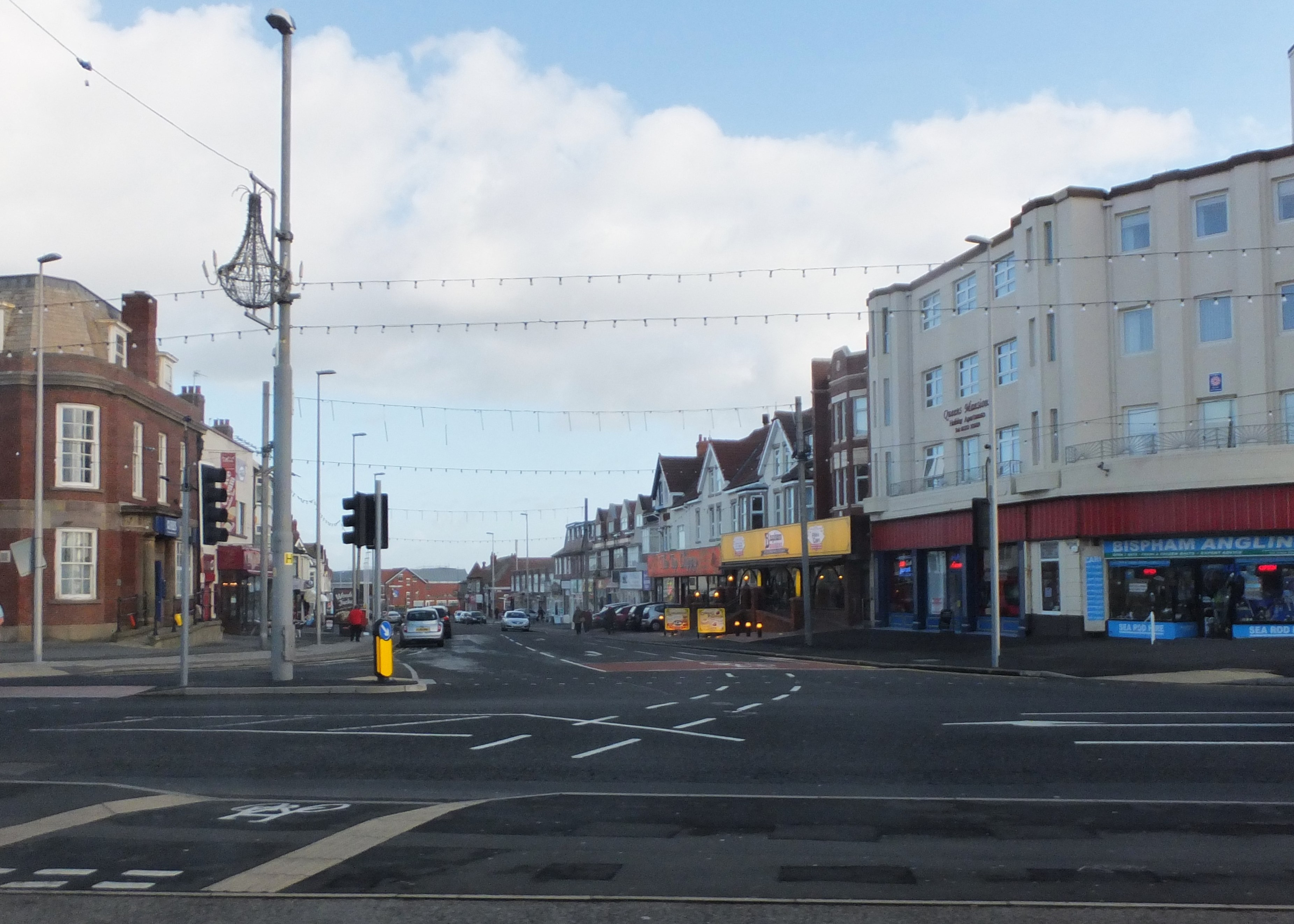
Red Bank Road, Bispham

== Demographics ==
The population at the 2001 United Kingdom census was 19,165, 13.41% of the population of Blackpool (142,900), with 3,873 residents aged between 0 and 17 years old (20.21%), 4,329 aged 65 and over (22.58%) and 10,963 between the ages of 18 and 64 (57.21%). At the census 2011 the overall population using the same three wards increased to 20,001.

Population by ward –

Ward	Population
Bispham	6,375
Greenlands	6,865
Ingthorpe	6,761

== History ==
A 12,000-year-old animal skeleton (the Carleton Elk) found with barbed arrowheads near Blackpool Sixth Form College in 1970 provided the first evidence of humans living on The Fylde as far back as the Palaeolithic era. The Fylde was also home to a British tribe, the Setantii (the "dwellers in the water") a sub-tribe of the Brigantes, who from about AD80 were controlled by Romans from their fort at Dowbridge, Kirkham. During the Roman occupation, the area was covered by oak forests and bog land.

Bispham was originally a village in its own right, pre-dating the town of Blackpool by several hundred years. In 1066 Bispham was part of Tostig Godwinson, the Earl of Northumbria's, Lordship of Amounderness. It is featured in the Domesday Book of 1086 as Biscopham. (meaning Bishop's estate or Bishop's house) Many of the settlements and villages on The Fylde were Anglo-Saxon settlements. Some though were 9th and 10th century Viking place names. The Vikings and Anglo-Saxons seem to have co-existed peacefully with some Anglo-Saxon and Viking place names later being joined—such as Bispham-with-Norbreck. Bispham having the Anglo-Saxon place name ham and Norbreck having the Viking place name, breck. Bispham-with-Norbreck comprised three hamlets – Great (or Greater) Bispham, Little Bispham and Norbreck, with Anchorsholme (then Angersholme) part of Norbreck. Although the three hamlets were originally part of the Lordship of Amounderness, they were later divided with the moiety of Little Bispham and Norbreck being given to Shrewsbury Abbey and Great Bispham to the Lord of Warrington.

Great Bispham was a part of the Lordship of Layton. In 1539, it was bought by John Browne, who sold it to Thomas Fleetwood in 1550.

The moiety of Little Bispham and Norbreck was given to the monks of Shrewsbury Abbey by Roger of Poitou. In the early 12th century Henry I ordered Stephen Count of Mortain to hold the moiety "free and quit of all customs, pleas and suits of the hundred court. A few years after, David I of Scotland confirmed the moiety "to be held as freely as in the time of his predecessors." In about 1270 the abbot and convent of Shrewsbury granted Little Bispham and Norbreck to the Abbot and convent of Dieulacres Abbey, who held the adjoining Rossall estate. Following the dissolution of the monasteries, it was granted as part of Rossall estate, in 1553 to Thomas Fleetwood. Thus by then all three hamlets were owned by Thomas Fleetwood.

In 1326, the spelling of the village was Byspham. Bispham and Poulton-le-Fylde were the two main populated centres in The Fylde in 1500, though the area was sparsely populated.

It was in Bispham that the first mention of "Blackpool" appeared, found in the Register of Bispham Parish Church in 1602 with the christening record of a child born on 22 September to a couple who lived "on the bank of the Black Pool". In the 17th century The Fylde coast was divided into three parishes—Bispham, Poulton-le-Fylde and Lytham. The ancient parish of Bispham included two townships called Bispham with Norbreck and Layton with Warbreck.

In 1851, the southern township of Layton with Warbreck, which included the nascent town of Blackpool within its boundaries, was made a Local Board of Health District, which was renamed Blackpool in 1868 and became a municipal borough in 1876.

In 1866, the old parish of Bispham was split when the two townships of Bispham with Norbreck and Layton with Warbreck were made separate civil parishes.

In 1877, a detached part of Little Carleton (then known as Horsemans Hill) was placed in Bispham with Norbreck. In 1879, the area known as Bispham Hawes, which was at the south end of Blackpool, was absorbed into the borough. The parish boundary was adjusted to match the new borough boundary in 1883. The population of Bispham with Norbreck in 1901 was 985. In 1903, the parish of Bispham with Norbreck was made an urban district. The urban district was abolished in 1918 and the area was absorbed into Blackpool.

Although the village centre used to be thatched with a number of pre-19th-century houses, it was redesigned in the 1960s; only two of the old houses remain. Much of the housing today is of the design style consistent with that of the 1930s to the 1950s.

== Modern Bispham ==
The area is mostly residential with two main shopping areas. The main road at the hub of the village, Red Bank Road, houses a number of high street stores such as Sainsbury's supermarket. The main shopping area in Bispham is split into two distinct parts. Firstly, from the top of Red Bank Road at the junction with Queens Promenade, running halfway down Red Bank Road toward Bispham fire station. This area contains a mixture of local and tourist businesses including a relatively large number of restaurants, as well as a number of takeaways and designer wear shops. The other shopping area is based around what is known locally as "the village" which is the area beyond Devonshire Road roundabout behind Bispham Police Station, where the shops are sited around a large outdoor car park. The village area also contains the handful of original cottages remaining in Bispham. There are also small shopping areas on Ashfield Road, Moor Park Avenue and Bispham Road.

=== Religion ===
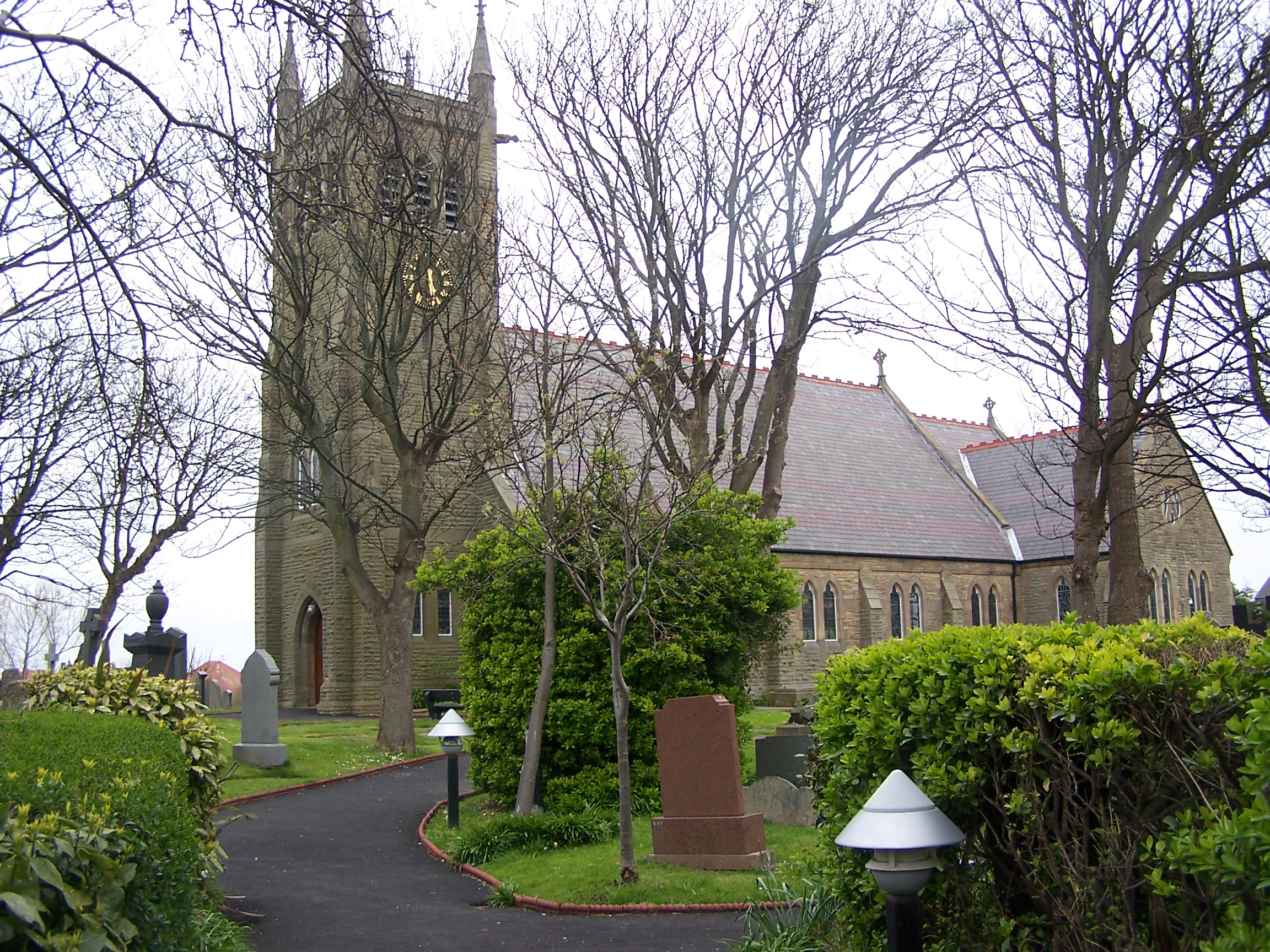
Bispham Parish Church, All Hallows

There are two Church of England Parish churches—Bispham Parish Church, All Hallows Road, and Greenlands St. Anne church, Salmesbury Avenue and one Catholic parish church, St. Bernadette's, on Devonshire Road. Other churches include The Gate Community Church, Bispham United Reformed Church, Springfield Greenlands Methodist Church, and Cavendish Road Congregational Church. An additional Methodist Church on Beaufort Avenue closed in 2017.

Bispham Parish Church has an original Norman doorway and is the Mother church of Blackpool. Greenlands, St Anne has an active healing ministry. Keajra Kadampa Buddhist Centre, a residential Buddhist centre and a member of the New Kadampa Tradition is located on Holmfield Road.

=== Education ===
Schools in the village include:

Primary schools:

- Bispham Endowed Church of England Primary School. The original school was housed in what is now the home of the local Sea Cadets. The school is connected to Bispham Parish Church, and the first school was founded in 1659.
- Kincraig Primary School, located close to Kincraig Lake Ecological Reserve
- Langdale Independent Preparatory School
- Moor Park Primary School
- Saint Bernadette's Catholic Primary School
- Westcliff Primary School

Secondary schools:

- Bispham High School Arts College (closed in 2014)
- Montgomery Academy

Further education college:

- Blackpool and The Fylde College

=== Local attractions and amenities ===
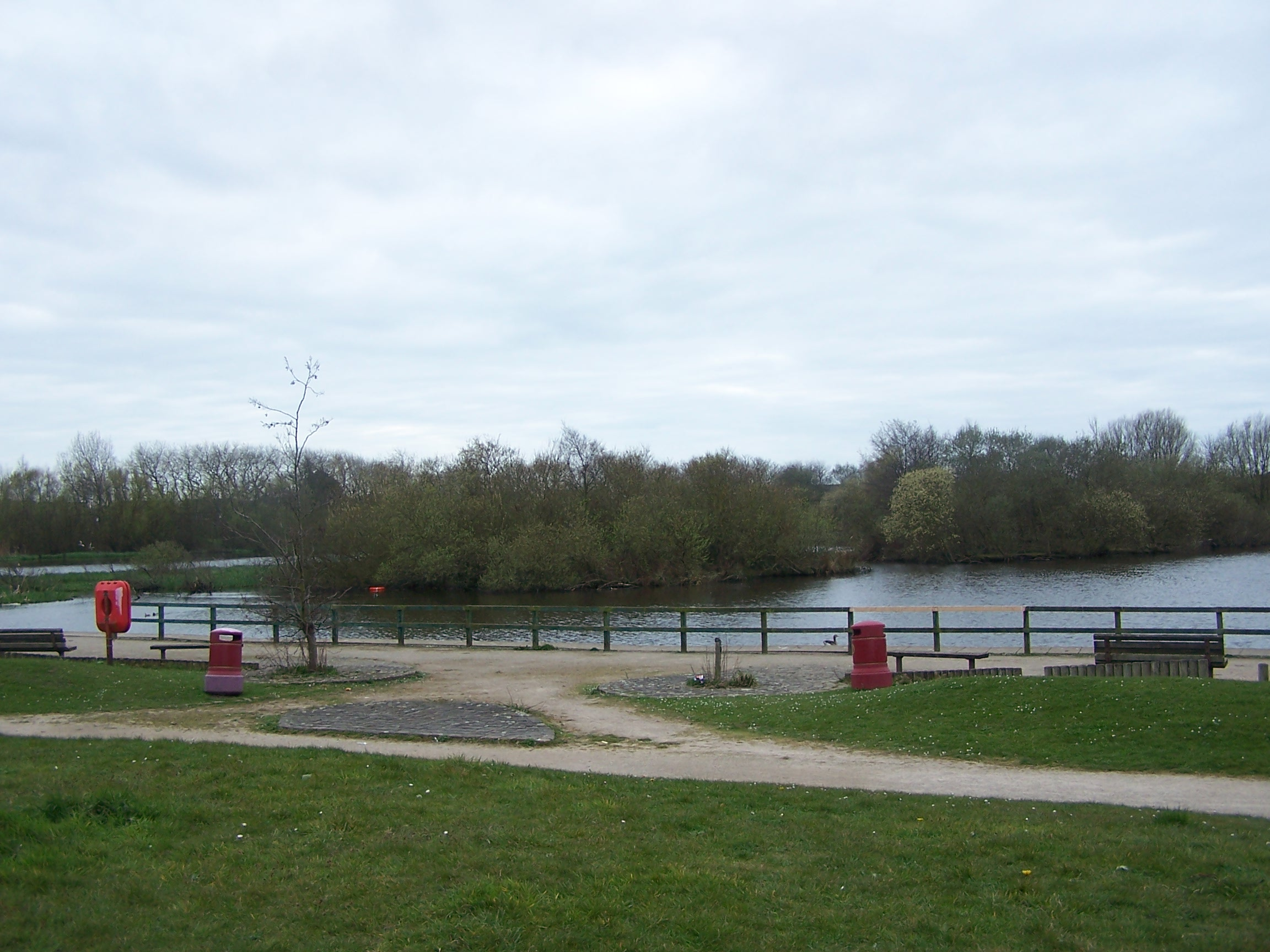
Part of Kincraig Lake, Kincraig Ecological Reserve

The village has a few attractions, with the tram station and the highest cliffs on both The Fylde Coast and the North West Coast. There are a number of hotels and guest houses mostly around the seaward end of Red Bank Road and on Queens Promenade. The Red Lion pub also houses a Premier Inn.

Bispham has five of the fourteen Lancashire County Council designated Biological Heritage Sites (BHS) located in Blackpool, including Kincraig Lake Ecological Reserve which is located on Kincraig Road, with Kincraig lake and a wild fowl population, from which Kincraig Primary School takes its school crest.

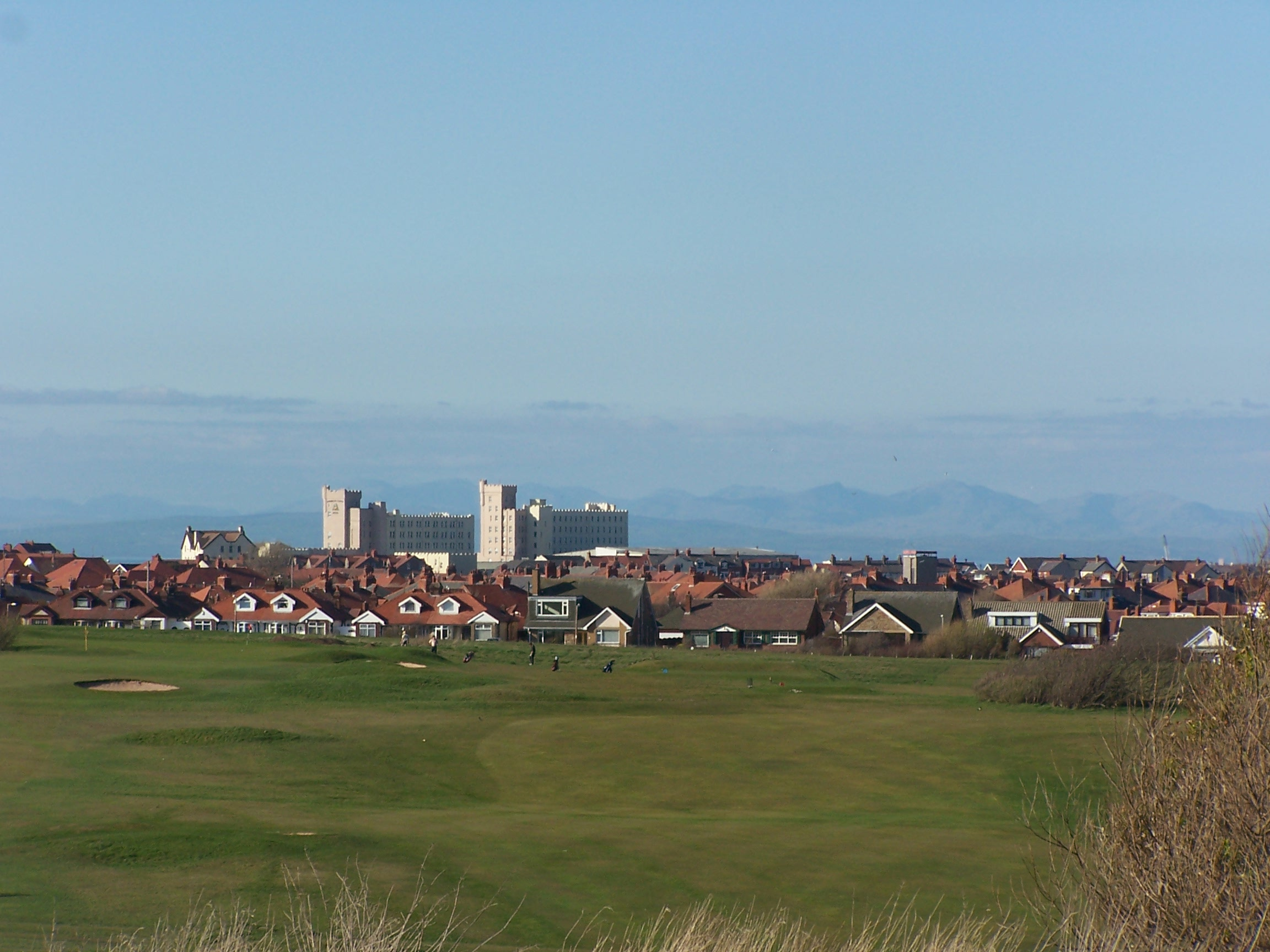
North Shore Golf course, with views of the Lake District hills, and the Norbreck Castle Hotel

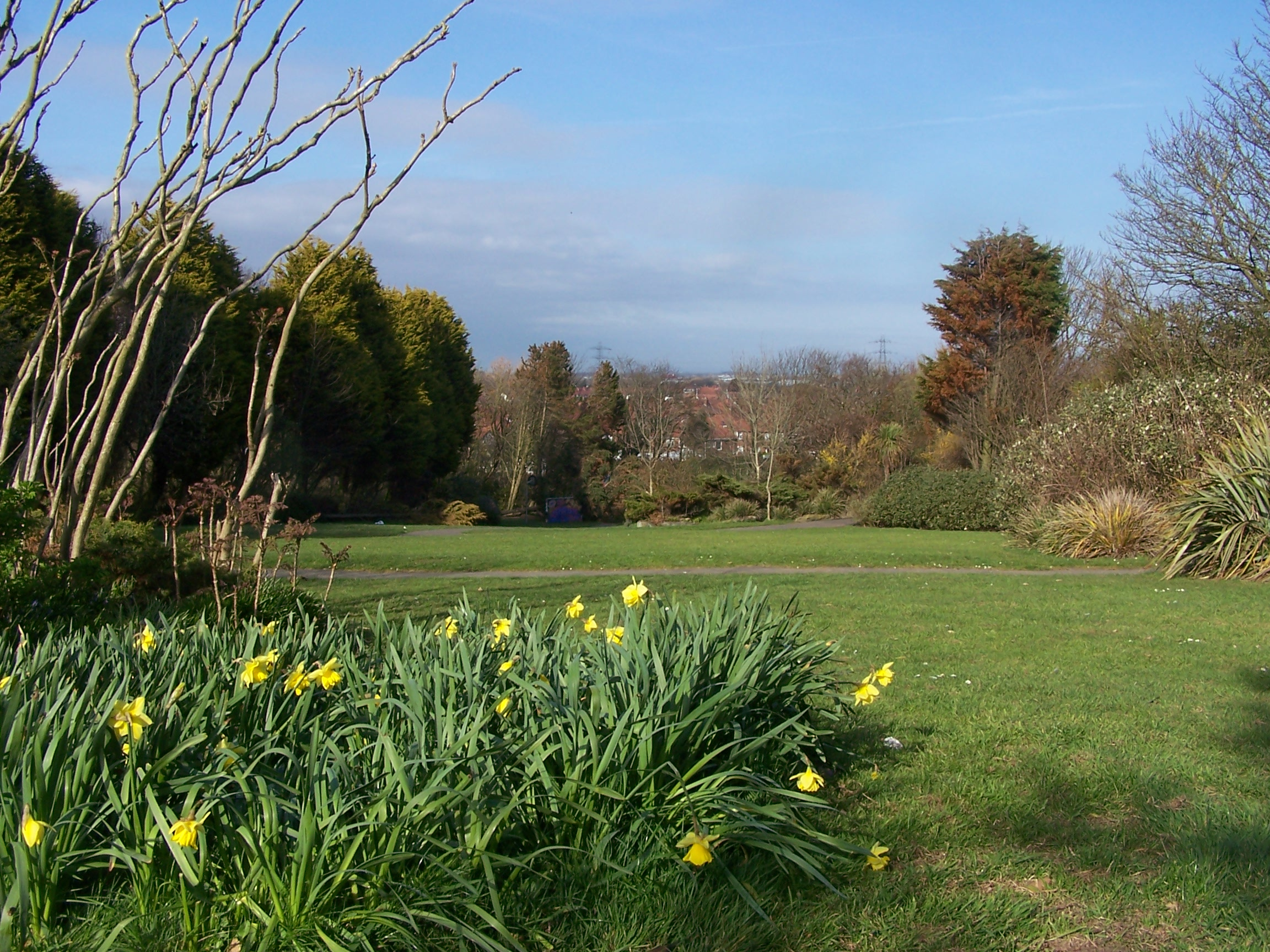
Bispham Rock Gardens

Bispham Rock Gardens is at the top of Knowle Hill on Devonshire Road and runs downhill toward the back of Bispham High School Arts College (formerly Greenlands High School for Girls), with views from the top toward Pendle Hill, Beacon Fell and the Bowland fells.

North Blackpool Pond Trail beginning at Holyoake Avenue and continuing as far as Moor Park Avenue covers a group of 23 ponds, a reed bed, a community orchard (on Salmesbury Avenue located at the former 'Higher Moor Farm') and a series of dykes /ditches, most of which are Biological Heritage Sites (important at a county level). A campaign by local residents and environmental groups led to the creation of a series of walks and interpretation boards along with a programme of events and volunteering opportunities though most of these 'walks' existed prior to their involvement and were produced by 'job creation' schemes. There are now significant opportunities for people to access and engage with the natural environment.

Moor Park runs adjoining Moor Park Avenue and Bispham Road. The park contains a children's playground, parkland, a (disused) bowling green and Moor Park Swimming Pool which is located in the northwest corner of the park. It has a 25-metre pool and a teaching pool. The Friends of Moor Park group was set up in January 2007 with the aim of restoring the park to its former glory including work on the footpaths through the park and the possibility of re-opening the disused bowling green as well as work on the children's playground.

Other parks in Bispham include Cavendish Road Recreation Ground which has tennis courts, football and basketball areas and a bowling green, which has a Friends group—Friends of Cavendish Road Recreation Ground. In November 2007, with both funding and planning obtained, work started at Cavendish Road Recreation Ground on a new Kiddies playground, aimed at children under seven years old; the new park opened in 2008. Red Bank Bowling Green is located next to Sainsbury's and is owned by the adjoining Bispham Conservative Club. The green was originally a garden belonging to the house which is now the Conservative Club.

Bispham Library was opened on 5 May 1938.

Bispham Hospital is a purpose built 40-bed rehabilitation unit, located on Ryscar Way for elderly patients from The Fylde coast as part of Blackpool Victoria Hospital.

Trinity Hospice is a specialist palliative care service for adults and children located on Low Moor Road.

Admiral Point on Queens Promenade is a luxury housing development in a Grade II listed building. It was originally The Miners Convalescent Home and was built by Bradshaw Gass & Hope between 1925 and 1927. It was opened by the Prince of Wales on 28 June 1927. The home, which for many years was empty was redeveloped into luxury homes by housebuilders Persimmon Homes and is now known as Admiral Point, with 47 apartments, together with 112 apartments and homes around the grounds, with two new six-storey apartment blocks built flanking the main building, and housing behind it.

In February 2006, it was revealed that sales of apartments in, what the company described as "the jewel in the crown" at Admiral Point had helped Persimmon Homes to record profits, such was the popularity of the new properties in the Grade II listed building. In October 2005, it was revealed that several high-profile footballers, including former Premiership player Robbie Fowler as well as Jonathan Macken, Mads Timm and former player Lee Sharpe had bought apartments at Admiral Point.

Bispham was also the home of British independent sports car manufacturer, TVR, one of the main employers in Bispham, before production ceased in 2007 under owner Nikolai Smolenski. In May 2007 it was announced that Midlands based businessman, William Riley was proposing to bring back car production to Bispham, with two cars planned for production at a new purpose built factory, which would be on Bispham Technology Park, the MG XPower SV and another Premium MG XPower roadster and coupe. On 27 July 2007, Blackpool Council announced that the sports car production would begin within a matter of weeks, initially at part of the former TVR factory; with the company eventually moving to a purpose built factory which had already been leased from the council by William Riley. Bispham Technology Park is a growing, modern, Office and Retail Park which is due to be expanded further in 2008 with the creation of Kincraig Business Park on a 3-acre (12,000 m^{2}) site within the park together with an environmental project with green space area to protect wildlife including a pond. On 11 January 2008, local MP, Joan Humble cut the first sod at a ceremony at the new Kincraig Business Park with the first of forty plots being created at the new park having already been taken even before building work started.

Layton railway station was originally named Bispham railway station. Both Bispham and Norbreck are separate areas of Blackpool. Although the two do come together annually for the Bispham and Norbreck Gala held in July of each year with a procession that winds through both Bispham and Norbreck starting and finishing at Bispham Gala fields, an open space which is owned by Blackpool Council with football pitches, a community centre, secure grazing area and with part of the land sublet to Blackpool Rugby union football club and a Golf Driving range. In 2007 local residents called for a covenant to be placed on the Gala fields to safeguard the land to be used for future galas.

=== Blackpool Illuminations ===
Red Bank Road is at the Northern end of the world-famous Blackpool Illuminations. The area at Bispham Cliffs contains the famous tableaux displays, where there is a pathway for holidaymakers and locals to view the tableaux close up. The first animated tableaux were erected in 1932 running along the cliffs from North Shore to Bispham, and the Illuminations were extended to its current length running from Starr Gate to Red Bank Road at Bispham. Some of the tableaux have sound and visual content that can only be viewed and heard by walking by them.

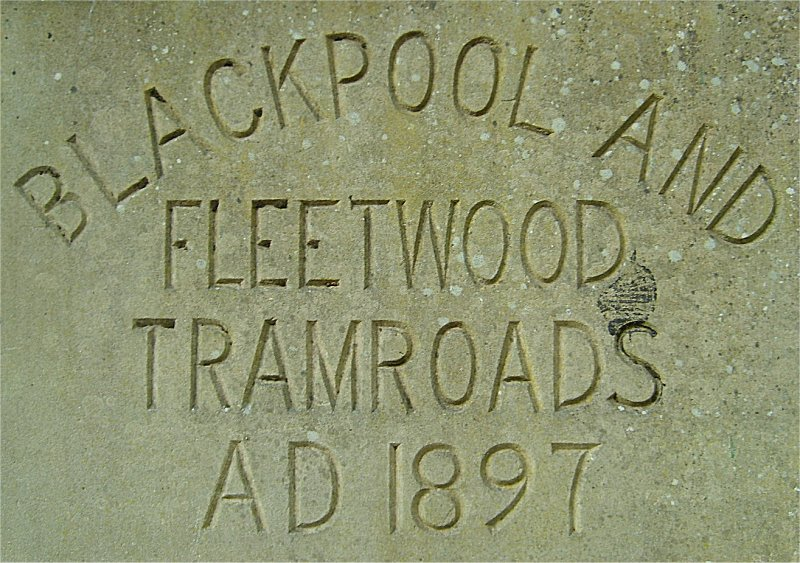
Headstone from Bispham depot

The tableaux also includes mixed media in the various large tableaux displays. The displays at the cliffs from North Shore to Bispham contain forty large tableaux holding more than 5,000 square metres in surface area. There is a pedestrian walkway running the length of the tableaux displays which are set back from the Promenade beyond the tramway. Blackpool Tramway runs along the entire length of the Illuminations and there are over one million lamps in the display. In 2007, the Egyptian tableau which includes Egyptian sarcophagus, which eerily opens to reveal a mummified secret, returned after an overhaul. Also at Bispham on the clifftop was a new BBC Portal video screen. In January 2008, new plans were revealed to erect two new all year round, triumphal arches at either end of the Illuminations, "selling the Blackpool message".

== Transport ==
=== Buses ===
Two bus companies serve the village.

=== Blackpool Tramway ===
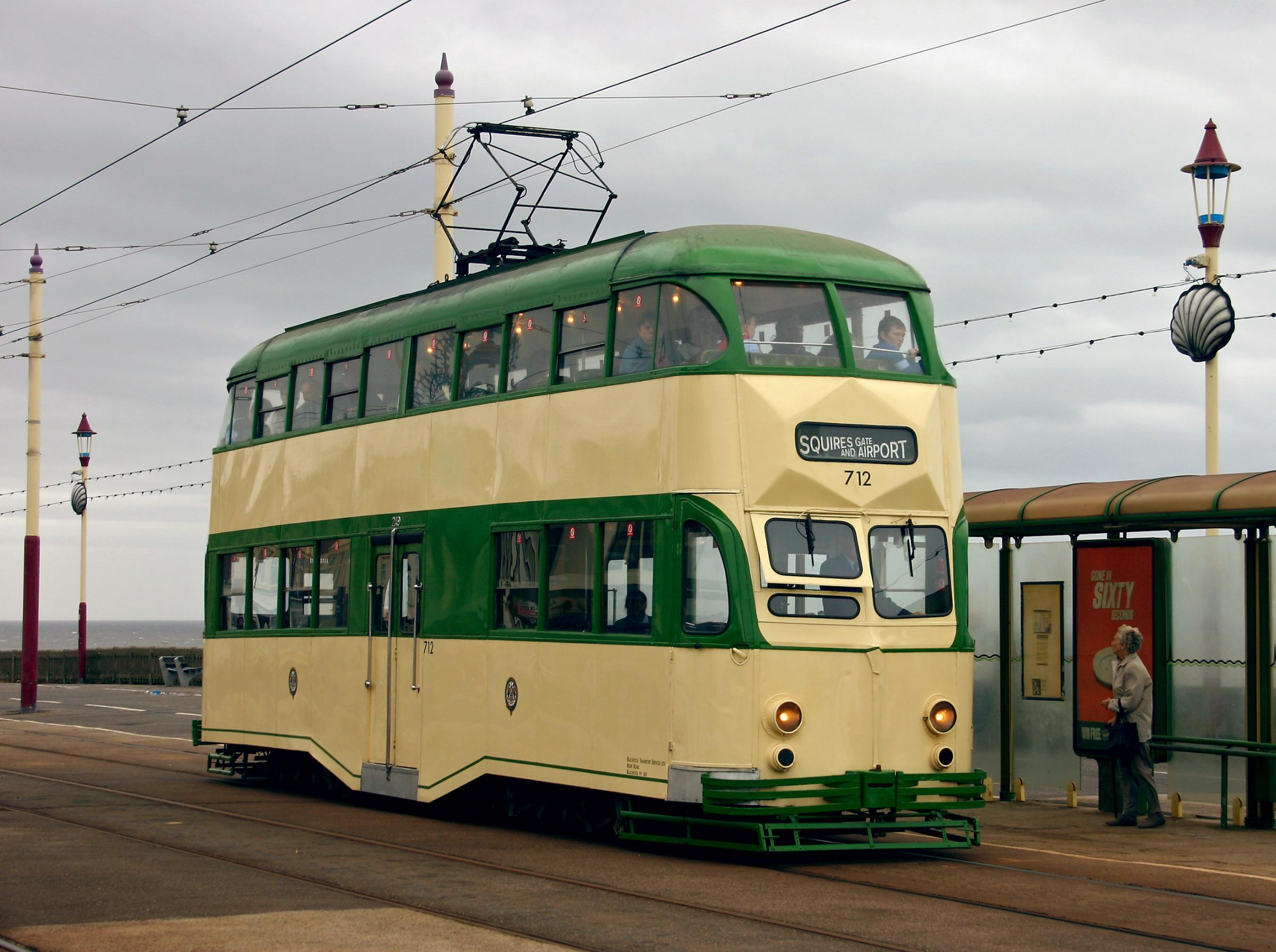
A double-decker balloon tram on the promenade at Bispham

Blackpool tramway runs along the length of the sea front at Bispham. In 1920, Blackpool Corporation took over the Blackpool & Fleetwood Tramroad Company gaining a further eight miles (13 km) of track, and also three further depots including the Bispham Tram Depot on Red Bank Road, until it closed in 1966. Built in 1898, Bispham Tram Depot had room to house 36 trams on six tracks, after being extended in 1914 by the Blackpool and Fleetwood Tramway Company. A substation was built to the side of depot. The depot was used to receive pantograph cars in 1928 and Brush cars in 1940. The depot closed on 27 October 1963 but used as a store, Alpic Cash & Carry until the mid-1970s. The building was eventually demolished to make place for a Sainsbury's supermarket. The Depots headstone was installed at Crich's National Tramway Museum.

== Notable people ==
- Emmerdale actress Kelsey-Beth Crossley was a pupil at Bispham High School
- Former Emmerdale actress Hayley Tamaddon was a pupil at Montgomery High School
- Coronation Street actress Violet Carson lived in Bispham until her death in 1983; she is commemorated at Bispham Parish Church.
- Former Brookside/The Royle Family actor Ricky Tomlinson was born in Bispham.
- English film-maker Alan Entwistle was born in Bispham.
- Actor Tony Melody lived in the Greenlands area of Bispham for many years until his death in June 2008.
- Footballer George Berry was born in Germany, then his family moved to Bispham soon after he was born.
- Former S Club 8 singer Stacey McClean is from Bispham.
- Professor Gerald R. Leighton was born in Bispham.

== Sport ==
North Shore Golf Club is located at the edge of Bispham with most of the golf course in Bispham. Tee Time Golf Centre Driving Range and nine-hole par three course is based on Fleetwood Road. Blackpool Rugby Union Football club are based in Bispham. Bispham Junior football Federation (BJFF) is based at Bispham Gala Fields. Blackpool Rangers also share this field.
