= George Bancroft Park, Blackpool =

Municipal park and garden in Blackpool, Lancashire, England

Coordinates: 53.8013°N 3.0482°W

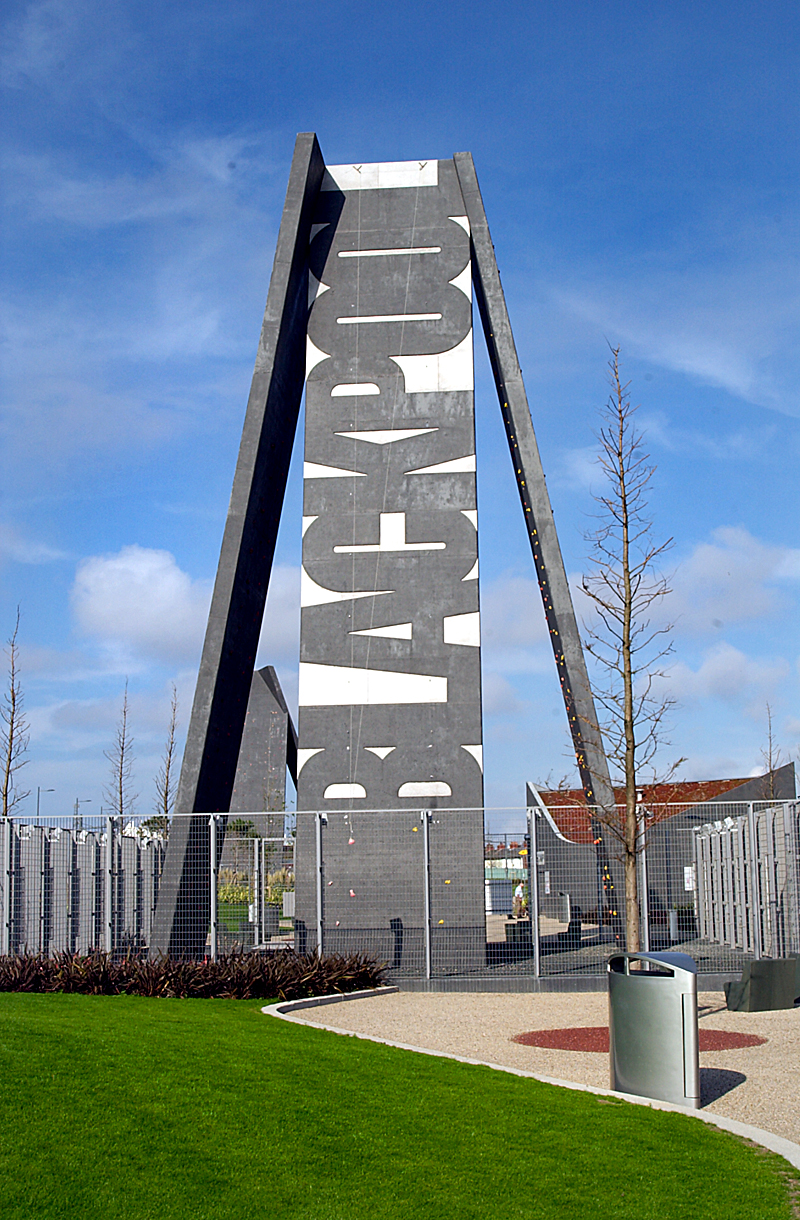
The climbing towers at George Bancroft Park

George Bancroft Park is a municipal park and garden created in the town of Blackpool, Lancashire, England in 2006. The park is named after George Bancroft; a former leader of Blackpool Town Council who died in 2001.

== Background ==
The development is part of Blackpool's "Central Gateway", a project which has gradually adapted derelict railway land, which was formerly the approach to Blackpool Central railway station, into an access road and associated facilities.

The park was ceremonially opened by designer and TV personality Laurence Llewellyn-Bowen on 24 May 2006, almost 80 years after the town's last major park, Stanley Park, was completed.

As well as the traditional gardens and children's play area, George Bancroft Park has an enclosed basketball and five-a-side football court. A more unusual aspect of the park is the presence of two highly sculptural 20-metre climbing towers and a bouldering wall.

== See also ==
- Bispham Rock Gardens
- Kincraig Lake Ecological Reserve
- Kingscote Park, Blackpool
- Salisbury Woodland Gardens, Blackpool
- Stanley Park, Blackpool
