= Kingscote Park, Blackpool =

Park in county of Lancashire, England

Coordinates: 53.825°N 3.027°W

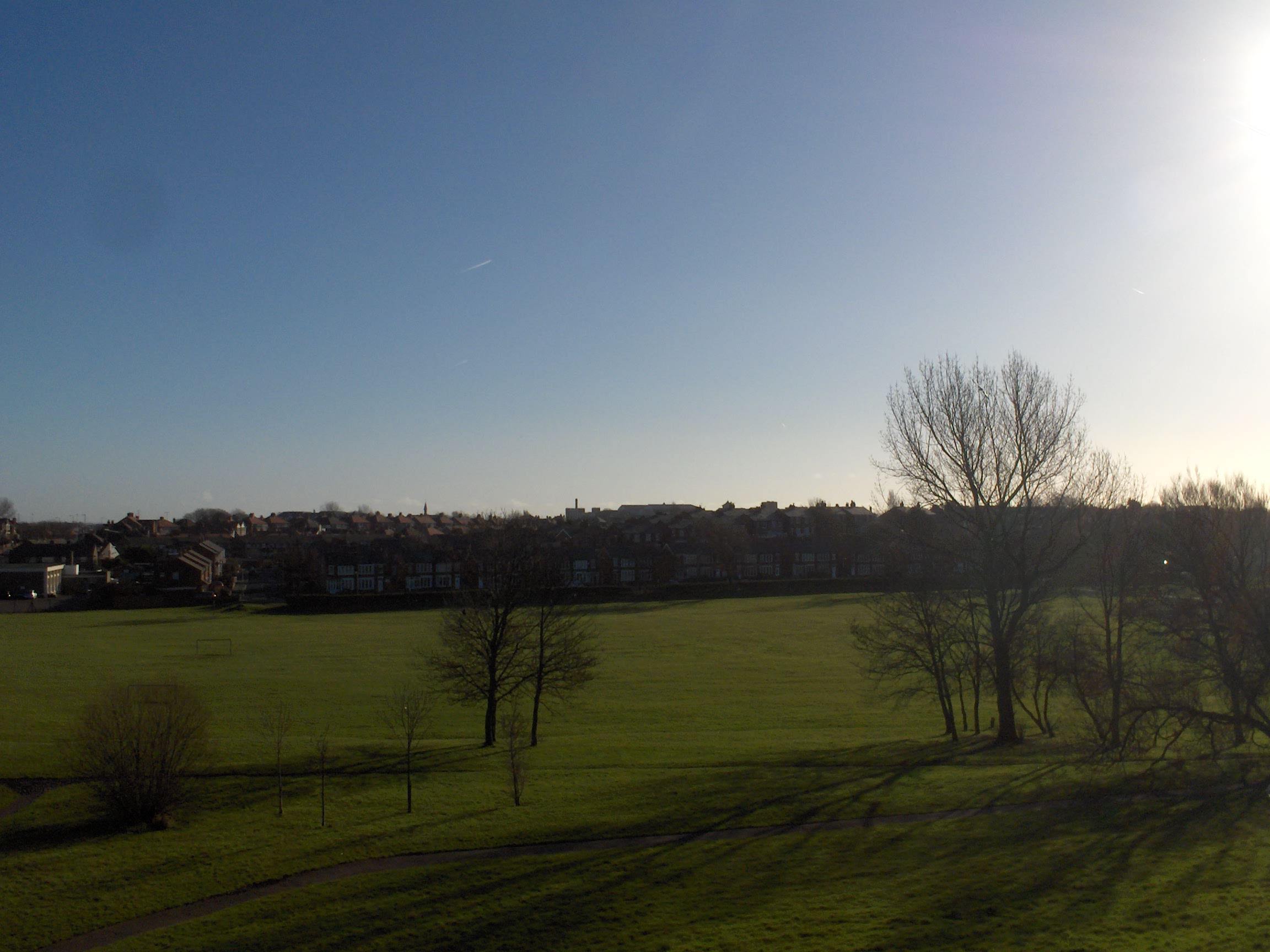
The main field of Kingscote Park

Kingscote Park is a municipal park extending over 98 acres (40 ha; 0.40 km^{2}) in Layton, a suburb of Blackpool in the county of Lancashire, England. The park is the second largest park within Blackpool after Stanley Park and the largest park in Layton.

== Background ==
Kingscote Park is bordered on the north by Grange Road, Nethway Avenue to the east, Bardsway Avenue and Blairway Avenue to the south and Kingscote Drive along the western side. The park has a large field to the North with trees along the west and south sides, with another field to the south-east which has trees along the south, east and western sides, a children's playground, tarmac sports area.

There is a disused building to the south west of the park. The friends of Kingcote Park are currently fundraising to demolish the existing building and build a new community centre.

== See also ==
- Bispham Rock Gardens
- George Bancroft Park, Blackpool
- Kincraig Lake Ecological Reserve
- Moor Park, Blackpool
- Salisbury Woodland Gardens, Blackpool
- Stanley Park, Blackpool
