= Seatruck Pace =

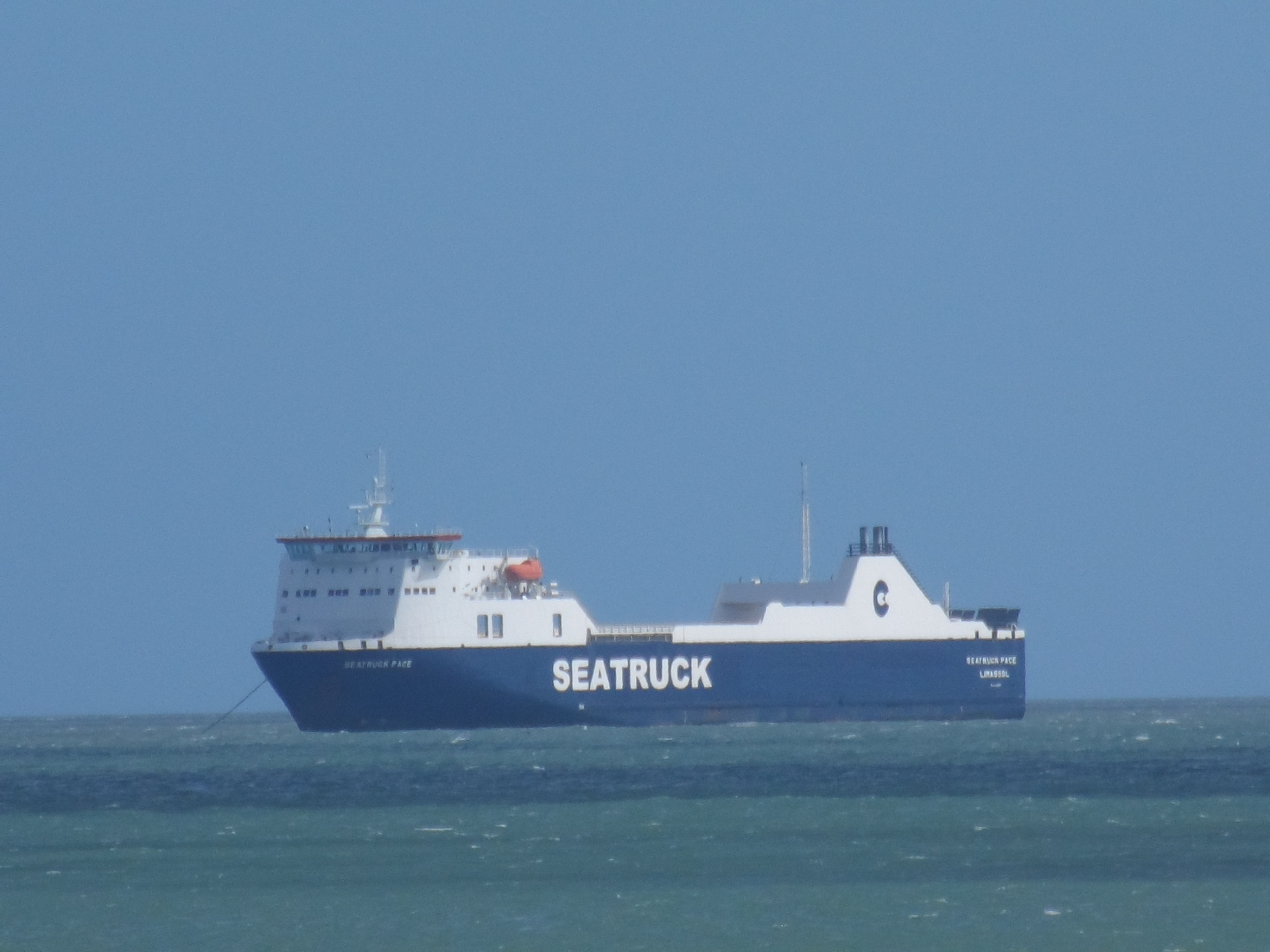
- Seatruck Pace in Dublin Bay.

History
- Name: Clipper Pace (2009 - 12); Seatruck Pace (2012 - 25); Al Hussein (2025 - present)
- Owner: Seatruck Ferries (2009 - 2022); CLdN (2022 - 2025); Arab Bridge Maritime (2025 - present)
- Operator: Seatruck Ferries (2009 - 2024); CLdN 2024 - 2025); Arab Bridge Maritime (2023 - present)
- Port of registry: (Cyprus) Port of Limassol (2009 - 2025); (Jordan) Port of Aqaba (2025 - present)
- Route: Dublin - Liverpool; Heysham - Dublin
- Builder: Astilleros de Huelva, Spain
- Yard number: 821
- Laid down: 29 June 2006
- Launched: 22 December 2007
- Completed: February 2009
- In service: 3 March 2009
- Identification: IMO number: 9350678

General characteristics
- Class & type: P Series
- Tonnage: 14,759 GT; 6,500 DWT
- Length: 142 m (465 ft 11 in)
- Beam: 23.03 m (75 ft 7 in)
- Draft: 5.20 m (17 ft 1 in)
- Decks: 3 vehicle decks
- Installed power: 2 × Wärtsilä 8L46D; (18.48 MW)
- Propulsion: 2 × propellers; 2 × Wärtsilä CT200 bow thrusters
- Speed: 22 knots (25 mph; 41 km/h)
- Capacity: 12 passengers; 120 trailers
- Crew: 23

Seatruck Pace is a ro-ro freight ferry operated by Arab Bridge Maritime. Built by Spanish shipyard Astilleros de Huelva, Seatruck Pace entered service In March 2009 on the Liverpool - Dublin route, named Clipper Pace for Seatruck Ferries.

== History ==
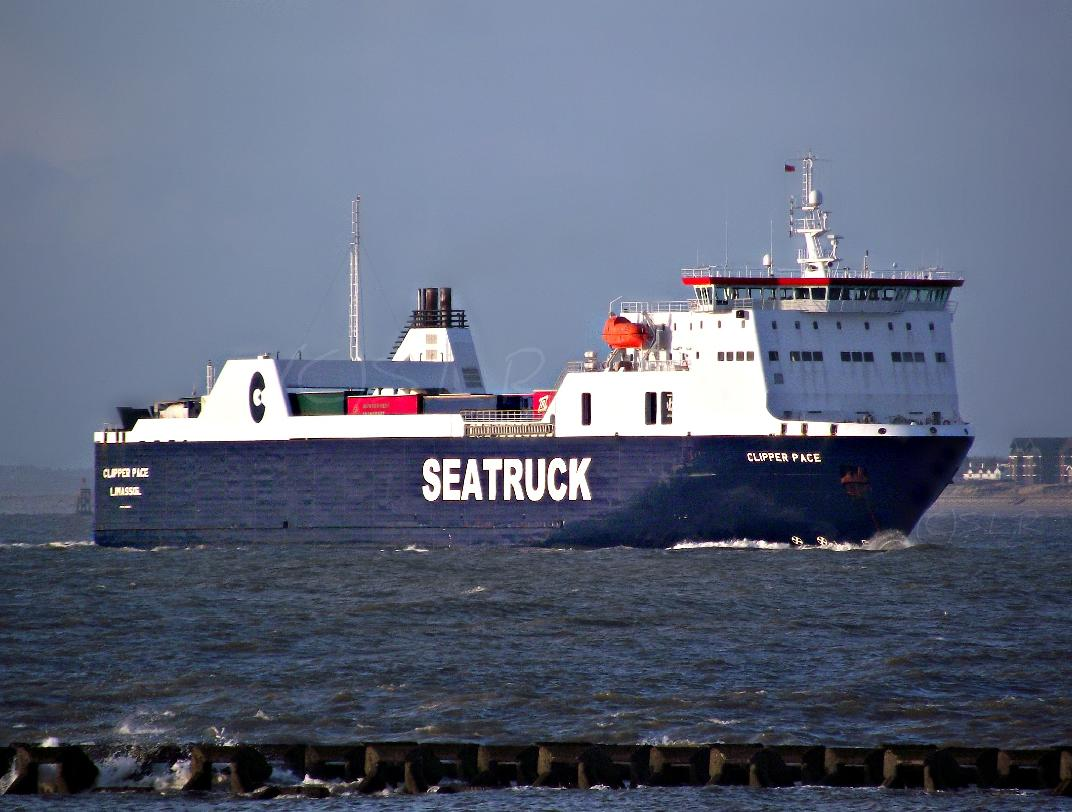
Clipper Pace off Lancashire in May 2016

Al Hussein is the third of four new ships for Seatruck. Her service speed of over 21 knots (39 km/h) enabled crossing times between Liverpool and Dublin to be reduced to six hours. Older ships like the Riverdance and Moondance took nine and a half hours to do the same journey.

In February 2012, the vessel was renamed Seatruck Pace. In May 2012 Seatruck Pace was chartered to DFDS and deployed on the Rosyth - Zeebrugge route.

In September 2022, CLdN bought out Seatruck Ferries' shares from the Clipper Group and as a result the whole fleet was also bought. Seatruck Ferries became defunct in February 2024, with all vessels being incorporated into the CLdN fleet.

In 2025, she was sold to Arab Bridge Maritime as Al Hussein.

== Description ==
Al Hussein is one of four "P Series" ro-ro freight ferries. It has a length of 142 metres (466 ft), a beam of 23 metres (75 ft) and a draft of 5.7 metres (19 ft). Det Norske Veritas class the vessel as a 1A1 General Cargo Carrier - with whom Seatruck Pace is allocated the number 26468.

The vessel is designed to fit in Heysham harbour. Trailers are carried over three decks.

The vessel is powered by two Wärtsilä 8L46D, 9240 kW each, diesel engines which drive two propellers. The vessel is also equipped with two Wärtsilä CT200 bow thrusters.

== Sister Vessels ==
- UR
- Seatruck Panorama
- Seatruck Point
