= Seatruck Ferries =

UK-based freight-only ferry company

- Company type: Subsidiary
- Industry: Freight transport
- Founded: 1996
- Defunct: 19 February 2024
- Fate: Absorbed into parent's CLdN brand
- Successor: CLdN RoRo
- Headquarters: Heysham
- Area served: Irish Sea
- Key people: Kristian Morch (Chairman); Alistair Eagles (CEO)
- Parent: CLdN https://www.cldn.com/
- Website: www.seatruckferries.com

Seatruck Ferries was a UK-based freight-only ferry company which commenced services in 1996. It became a subsidiary of CLdN and was absorbed into the Luxembourg-based parent's overall brand as CLdN RoRo in February 2024. It operated out of four ports on the Irish Sea, including Heysham and Liverpool.

== History ==
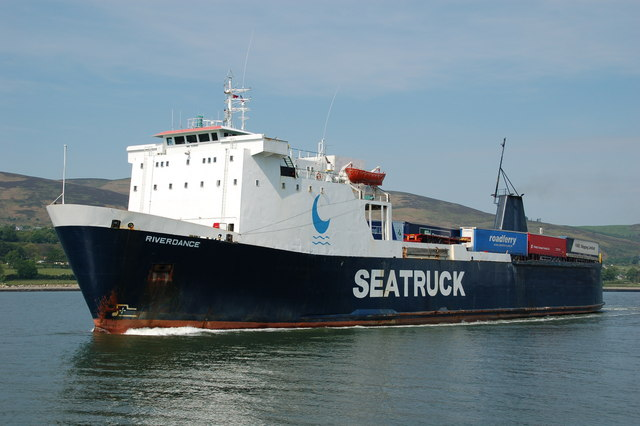
Riverdance, Seatruck's first vessel

Seatruck was established in 1996, operating one ship, Riverdance, between Heysham, Lancashire, England and Warrenpoint, County Down, Northern Ireland. She was joined in April 1997 by sister ship Moondance, which was also operated on the Heysham to Warrenpoint service, a service which continues today as a two-ship service.

In 2002, the company was acquired by the Clipper Group. Also in 2002, European Mariner was chartered for two months, before moving on to Color Line.

In 2005, Seatruck Ferries ordered its first new ships, five "P Series" ro-ro freight ferries, however only four were built. These vessels were named Clipper Point, Clipper Panorama, Clipper Pace and Clipper Pennant. All four vessels were built by Spanish shipyard Astilleros de Huelva.

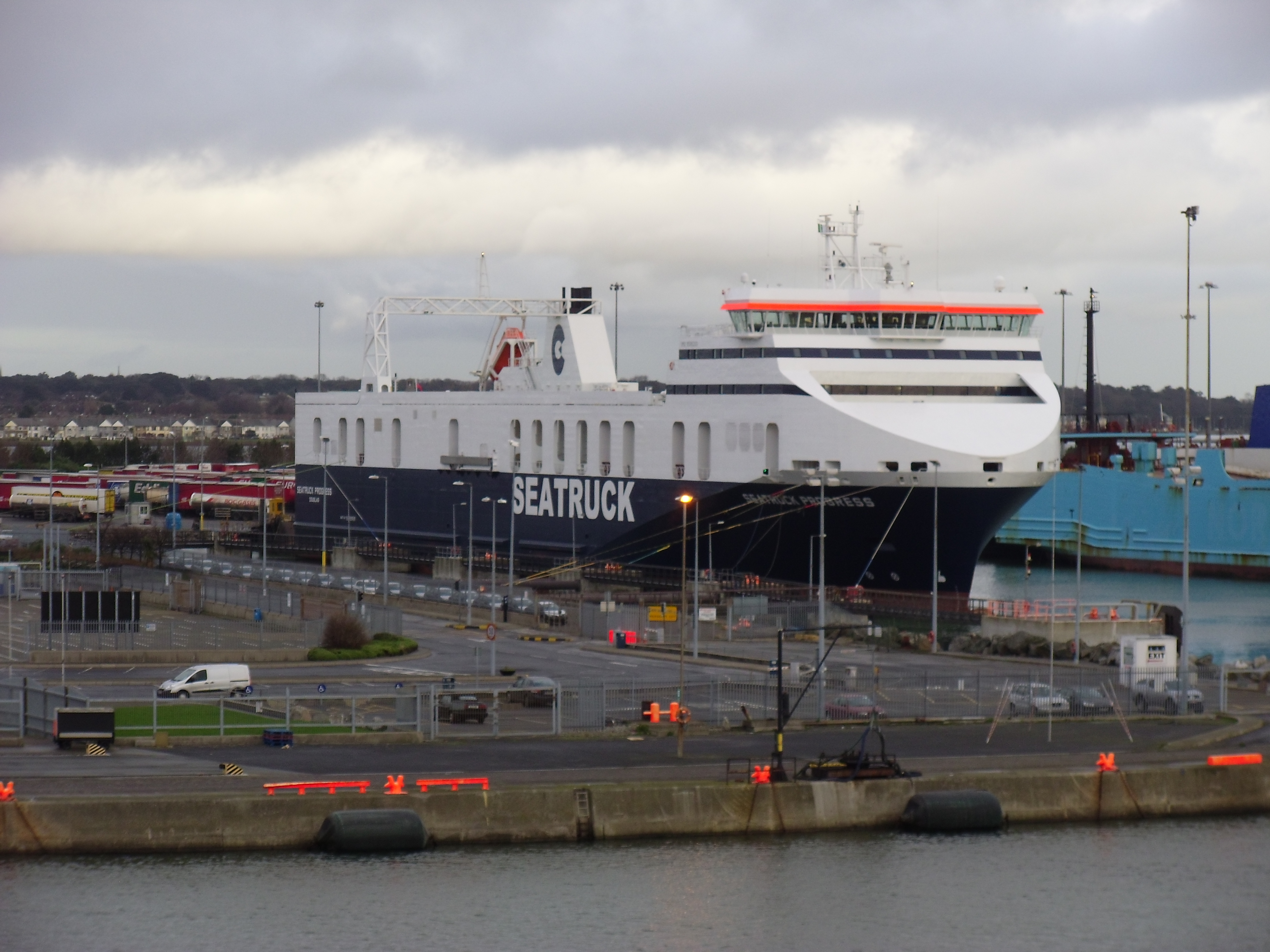
The first of the RoRo 2200 ferries - Seatruck Progress

Between late 2005 and late 2009, Seatruck acquired four sister ships, Challenge (Clipper Ranger), Triumph (Helliar), Shield (Hildasay) and Arrow. These were later deployed on charters to Caledonian MacBrayne, NorthLink Ferries and the Isle of Man Steam Packet Company respectively. The later three were eventually bought by the charterers mentioned in 2019 and 2022 respectively.

In 2007, Seatruck chartered the Celtic Star, which was deployed on the Liverpool to Dublin route.

In January 2008, the company's pioneering ship, Riverdance, ran aground in Blackpool. Seatruck chartered Phocine to cover Riverdance's services until Clipper Point entered service. Attempts to refloat the vessel failed, and she was broken up in situ in the summer of 2008. In March 2008, Clipper Point became the company's first new ferry, entering service on the Heysham to Warrenpoint route. Panorama followed in January 2009, Pace in March 2009 and Pennant in October 2009.

In March 2008, the same month that Clipper Point entered service, Seatruck Ferries placed an order for four RoRo 2200 ferries to be built by Flensburger Schiffbau-Gesellschaft in Germany.

The first two of these vessels launched in late 2011, named Seatruck Progress and Seatruck Power, whilst the third, Seatruck Performance, launched in January 2012. The final ship of the class, Seatruck Precision, launched in March 2012. Progress entered service in December 2011, Power joined the fleet in February 2012, Performance joined the fleet in April 2012 and lastly Precision will join the fleet before mid-2012.

In late 2011, one of the earlier "P Series" vessels, Clipper Panorama, was renamed Seatruck Panorama whilst Clipper Pace was renamed Seatruck Pace in February 2012.

In 2015, Ole Frie stepped down as chairman of the board. Kristian Morch was appointed as Frie's replacement. Alistair Eagles was also appointed CEO of Seatruck.

In May 2015, Clipper Ranger finished her long-term charter with Caledonian MacBrayne. The Clipper Point also finished her charter with DFDS. She was then chartered to Inter Shipping (Spain) to operate on the company's Algeciras–Tanger Med II route.

In March 2019, both Helliar and Hildasay were sold to Caledonian Maritime Assets Limited for continued use on the Serco NorthLink freight route Aberdeen - Kirkwall - Lerwick.

In December 2019, MV Clipper Ranger was sold to Coopérative de Transport Maritime et Aérien (CTMA) for $11.5 million. This was after being on charter to them since July 2019.

In September 2022, MV Arrow, was sold to Isle of Man Steam packet Company for £8 million, after being on charter to them for many years. This meant the last of the R Class freight ferries were sold out of Seatruck.

In September 2022, the business was purchased by CLdN of Belgium with eight vessels.

In August 2023, MV Seatruck Pennant was sold to Arab Bridge Maritime and renamed UR.

At noon on 19 February 2024, the name Seatruck was discontinued and replaced with the CLdN RoRo brand of the company's new owners.

== Routes ==
Seatruck operated three routes on the Irish Sea, serving four ports.

- Heysham–Warrenpoint
- Heysham–Dublin
- Liverpool–Dublin

== Fleet ==
=== Final fleet ===
At the time of the rebranding to CLdN RoRo, Seatruck owned and operated six vessels, most of which are in service for Seatruck, with one in service for the parent company, CLdN.

The newest vessel in the Seatruck fleet is Seatruck Precision, which entered service in June 2012.

| Image | Ship | Built (Commissioned) | Route | Truck Capacity | Notes |
|---|---|---|---|---|---|
| | Seatruck Pace | February 2009 (March 2009) | Liverpool - Dublin - Santander (for CLdN) | 120 | Sold in 2025, after being taken over by CLdN, renamed Al Hussein. |
| | Seatruck Point | March 2008 (March 2008) | Dublin - Liverpool | 120 | Formerly named Clipper Point |
| | Seatruck Progress | November 2011 (December 2011) | Dublin - Liverpool | 151 | |
| | Seatruck Power | February 2012 (February 2012) | Dublin - Heysham | 151 | |
| | Seatruck Performance | April 2012 (April 2012) | Heysham - Warrenpoint | 151 | Formerly named Stena Performer when on long-term charter to Stena Line |
| | Seatruck Precision | June 2012 (June 2012) | Heysham - Warrenpoint | 151 | Formerly named Stena Precision when on long-term charter to Stena Line |

=== Former fleet ===
These are vessels that have previously been operated or chartered by Seatruck.

| Image | Ship | Built (Commissioned) (Out of Service) | Route | Truck Capacity | Notes |
|---|---|---|---|---|---|
| | Anglia Seaways | August 2000 (Feb 2011, May 2012) (Jan 2012, Mar 2014) | Heysham - Dublin; Heysham - Belfast; Heysham - Warrenpoint | 120 | Chartered from DFDS |
| | Seatruck Panorama | November 2008 (January 2009) | Dublin - Heysham | 120 | Sold in 2024,renamed Santa Rita. |
| | Seatruck Pennant | August 2009 (October 2009) (August 2023) | Liverpool - Dublin; Heysham - Dublin; Heysham - Warrenpoint | 120 | Sold in 2023, renamed UR. |
| | Hildasay | November 1999 (October 2008) (March 2019) | Liverpool - Dublin; Cuxhaven - Immingham; Aberdeen - Kirkwall - Lerwick | 65 | Sold to Caledonian Maritime Assets 2019; Formerly named Shield |
| | Arrow | August 1998 (October 2007) (September 2022) | Heysham - Douglas | 65 | Sold to Isle of Man Steampacket Company in September 2022 |
| | Helliar | October 1997 (October 2007) (March 2019) | Portsmouth - Jersey - Guernsey; Douglas - Heysham; Dublin - Liverpool; Naples - Palermo; Aberdeen - Kirkwall - Lerwick | 65 | Sold to Caledonian Maritime Assets 2019; Formerly named Triumph and Clipper Racer |
| N/A | West Express | November 1998 (May 2008) (January 2009) | Heysham - Warrenpoint; Liverpool - Dublin | 80 | Charter from West Express Shipping |
| N/A | Lygra | February 1979 (April 2008) (June 2008) | Heysham - Warrenpoint | N/A | Short-term charter in 2008 |
| N/A | Phocine | December 1984 (February 2008) (March 2008) | Heysham - Warrenpoint | 94 | Short-term charter in 2008 |
| | Merchant Brilliant | July 1979 (January 2008) (April 2008) | Heysham - Warrenpoint | 80 | Short term charter in 2008. Sistership to West Express. |
| | Celtic Star | August 1991 (September 2007) (May 2008) | Liverpool - Dublin | 70 | Chartered 2007, to P&O Irish Sea in 2008 for the same route. |
| | Clipper Ranger | April 1998 (2005, February 2008) (2005, December 2019) | Heysham - Warrenpoint; Liverpool - Dublin; Belfast - Heysham; Ullapool - Stornoway | 65 | Chartered in 2005. Sold to CTMA in December 2019 |
| | European Mariner | January 1978 (April 2002) (May 2002) | Heysham - Warrenpoint | 53 | Short-term charter in 2002. |
| | Moondance | July 1978 (April 1997) (November 2009) | Heysham - Warrenpoint | 55 | Sold in 2009. On charter from April 1997 before being bought in November 1998. |
| | Riverdance | April 1977 (July 1996) (January 2008) | Heysham - Warrenpoint | 55 | Beached at Cleveleys in Jan 2008, later cut up on site. |
| N/A | Bolero | April 1985 (April 1996) (May 1997) | Heysham - Warrenpoint | N/A | Sold and converted to cable layer in 2001. |
