= MS UR =

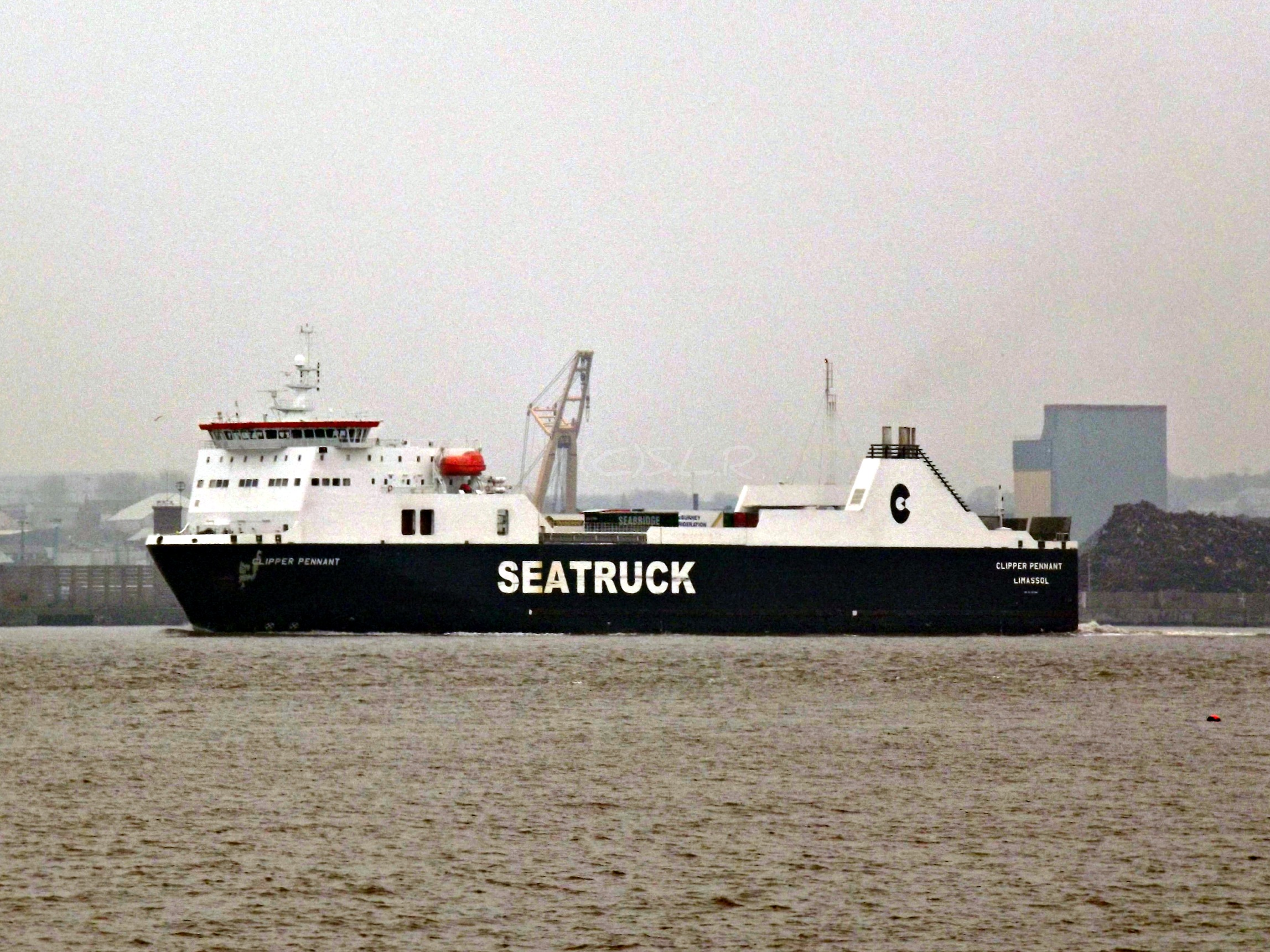

History
- Name: Clipper Pennant (2009–2022); Seatruck Pennant (2022–2023); UR (2023–present)
- Owner: Seatruck Ferries (2009–2023); Arab Bridge Maritime (2023–present)
- Operator: Seatruck Ferries (2009–2023); Arab Bridge Maritime (2023–present)
- Port of registry: (Cyprus) Port of Limassol (2009–2023); (Jordan) Port of Aqaba (2023–present)
- Route: Liverpool – Dublin; Heysham – Dublin; Belfast – Birkenhead (Stena Line); Heysham – Warrenpoint; Immingham – Cuxhaven (DFDS); Hirtshals – Torshavn – Seydisfjördur (Smyril Line); Esbjerg – Aabenraa – Bremerhaven – Rostock (Blue Water Shipping); Gothenburg – Kiel (Stena Line); Las Palmas – Huelva (Canary Bridge Seaways)
- Builder: Astilleros de Sevilla, Spain
- Yard number: 823
- Laid down: 15 June 2007
- Launched: 15 October 2008
- Completed: 24 August 2009
- Maiden voyage: 13 October 2009
- In service: 13 October 2009
- Identification: IMO number: 9372688
- Status: In service

General characteristics
- Class & type: P Series ferry
- Tonnage: 14,759 GT; 6,500 DWT
- Length: 142 m (465 ft 11 in)
- Beam: 23.03 m (75 ft 7 in)
- Draft: 5.20 m (17 ft 1 in)
- Decks: 3 vehicle decks
- Installed power: 2 × Wärtsilä 8L46 diesel engines; 16,000 kW (21,000 hp); 3 × Wärtsilä 4L20 diesel engines (auxiliary)
- Propulsion: 2 × propellers; 2 × Wärtsilä CT200 bow thrusters
- Speed: 22 knots (41 km/h; 25 mph)
- Capacity: 12 passengers; 120 trailers
- Crew: 23

MS UR is a roll-on/roll-off freight ferry built in 2009 owned by Arab Bridge Maritime. She was owned by Clipper Group and has been chartered to a number of operators.

== Description ==
UR is one of four "P Series" roll-on/roll-off freight ferries. It has a length of 142 metres (465 ft 11 in), a beam of 23 metres (75 ft 6 in) and a draft of 5.7 metres (19 ft). Det Norske Veritas class the vessel as a 1A1 General Cargo Carrier - with whom UR is allocated the number 27192.

The vessel is powered by two Wärtsilä 8L45D diesel engines which drives two variable pitch propellers. The vessel is also equipped with two Wärtsilä CT200 bow thrusters.

== History ==
Clipper Pennant was built by Astilleros de Huelva, Spain, as yard number 823. Laid down on 15 June 2006 and launched on 15 October 2008, Clipper Pennant was completed on 24 August 2009. It arrived at Liverpool on its delivery voyage on 22 September 2009. Homeported at Limassol, Cyprus, she was employed on Seatruck Ferries' Liverpool to Dublin route. Clipper Pennant made her maiden revenue-earning voyage for Seatruck on 13 October 2009.

In May 2012 Clipper Pennant was placed onto Seatruck's Heysham – Warrenpoint route to cover for Seatruck Pace which has gone on charter to DFDS Seaways. It has since operated for Stena Line and Smyril Line, and Blue Water Shipping for transportation of wind turbines. In December 2019 she was chartered for three years to operate Liverpool to Dublin services for P&O Ferries. In December 2022, Clipper Pennant had her name changed to Seatruck Pennant, inline with the rest of the Seatruck Ferries vessels.

On 4 August 2023, Seatruck Pennant was sold to Arab Bridge Maritime and renamed UR.

== Sister vessels ==
- Seatruck Pace
- Seatruck Panorama
- Seatruck Point
