= MS Phocine =

History

- Name: Balder Sten 1985; Bazias 3 1985–1993; Sally Euroroute 1993–1996; Merle 1996–2000; Dart 3 2000–2006; Phocine 2006–2012
- Owner: K/S A/S Balder RO/RO No 2 1985; Navrom 1985–1996; Jacobs Holdings 1996–????; Bid Corp Shipping ????–2006; Dart 3 Ltd.
- Operator: K/S A/S Balder RO/RO No 2. 1985; Navrom 1985–1991; Sally Line 1991–1996; Belfast Freight Ferries 1996–2000; Dart Line 2000; Norse Merchant Ferries 2000–2001; Dart Line 2001–2006; Cobelfret Ferries 2006–2007; Isle of Man Steam Packet Company 2007; Cobelfret Ferries 2007–2008; Seatruck Ferries
- Builder: Santierul Naval Galatz SA, Romania
- Yard number: 769
- Completed: December 1984
- Homeport: Hamilton, Bermuda
- Identification: IMO number: 8009064; Callsign ZCDH2
- Status: In service

General characteristics
- Tonnage: 9,088 GT
- Length: 121.48 m (398 ft 7 in)
- Beam: 21 m (68 ft 11 in)
- Draught: 5.30 m (17 ft 5 in)
- Installed power: 2 × Krupp 9M453AK 9 cylinder diesel engines, 7,200 hp (5,400 kW)
- Speed: 15.5 knots (28.7 km/h)
- Capacity: 12 passengers, 1,272 m (4,173 ft) freight lanes, 94 trailers.
- Crew: 18

The Phocine is a ferry owned by Dart 3 Ltd and currently in service with Seatruck Ferries.

== History ==
Phocine was completed in 1984 as Balder Sten, owned by K/S A/S Balder RO/RO No 2. She was sold to Navrom and renamed Bazias 3 in 1985 and operated by them until 1991 when she was chartered to Sally Line, being renamed Sally Euroroute in 1993 and used on the Ramsgate–Ostend route. In 1996 she was sold to Jacobs Holdings (Dart Line) who used her on the Dartford–Vlissingen and Dartford–Zeebrugge routes, renamed Merle and chartered to Belfast Freight Ferries until 2000, when she was renamed Dart 3 and operated by Dart Line. At some point she was sold to Bid Corp Shipping.

She was chartered to Norse Merchant Ferries in 2000 and used on the Belfast–Heysham route, returning to Dart Line in 2001. As well as her former routes with Dart Line, she was also used on the Dartford–Dunkirk route. In 2006 she was sold to Dart 3 Ltd and renamed Phocine on charter to Cobelfret Ferries, being used on the North Killingholme Haven–Zeebrugge route. In 2007 she was on charter to the Isle of Man Steam Packet Company, returning to Cobelfret later in the year being used on the Ostend–Purfleet and Killingholme–Ostend routes. In 2008 she was chartered by Seatruck Ferries to replace Riverdance, Phocine was herself due to be replaced by Clipper Point when that vessel entered service with Seatruck.
