= Seatruck Precision =

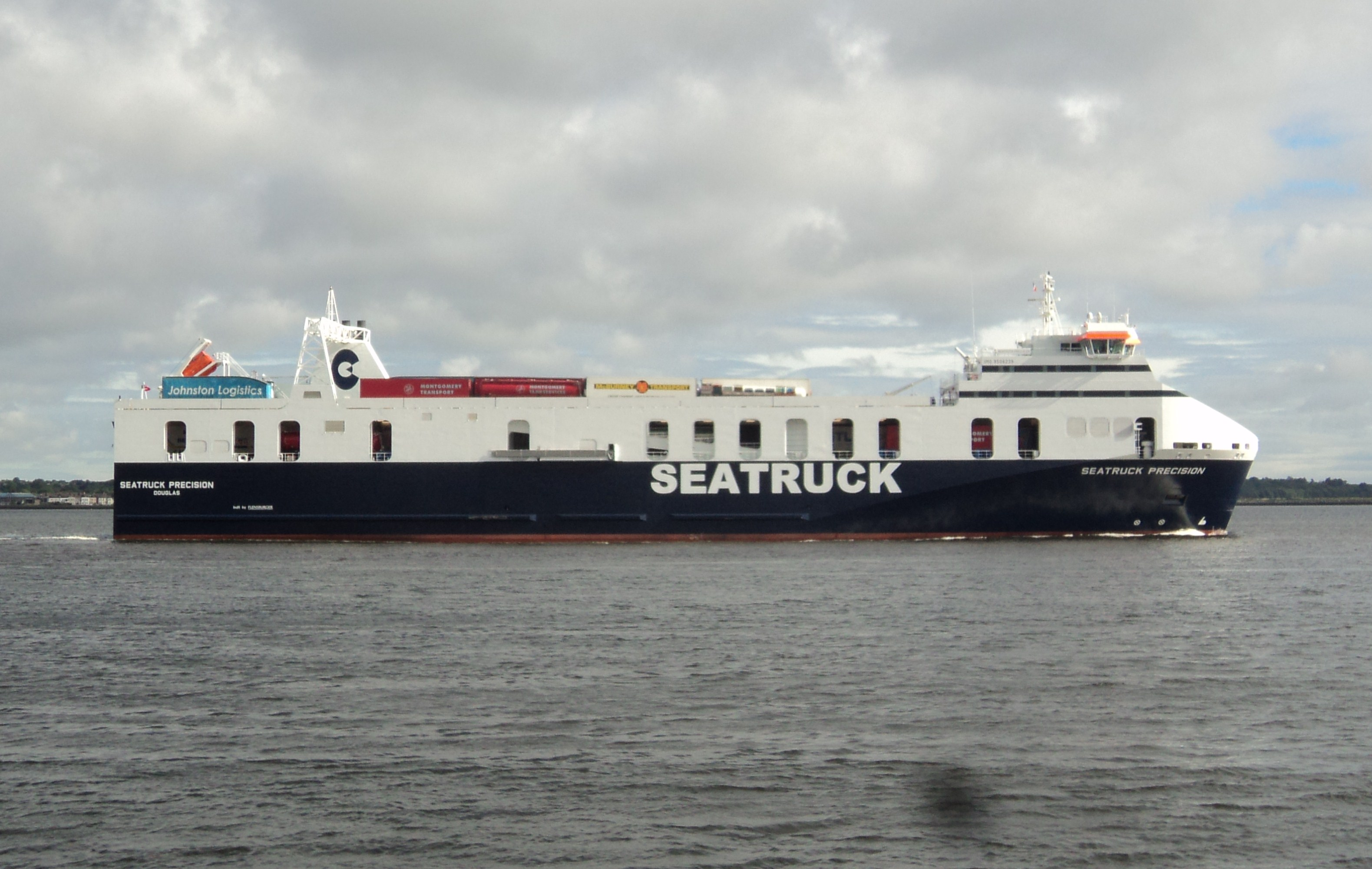
- Precision sailing from Dublin 19-7-12.

History
- Name: Seatruck Precision (2012); Stena Precision (2012 - 2018); Seatruck Precision (2018 - 2025); Precision (2025 - )
- Owner: Seatruck Ferries (2012 - 2022); CLdN (2022 - )
- Operator: Seatruck Ferries (2012, 2018 - 2024); Stena Line (2012 - 2018); CLdN (2024 - )
- Port of registry: (Isle of Man) Douglas (2012 - 2024); (Malta) Valletta (2024 - )
- Route: Belfast - Heysham (2012 - 2018); Heysham - Warrenpoint; Liverpool - Dublin
- Builder: Flensburger Schiffbau-Gesellschaft, Flensburg, Germany
- Yard number: 752
- Laid down: 16 January 2012
- Launched: 23 March 2012
- Maiden voyage: 10 July 2012
- Identification: IMO number: 9506239; MMSI number: 235092453; Callsign: 2FMI8
- Status: In service

General characteristics
- Class & type: RoRo 2200
- Tonnage: 18,920 GT; 5,255 DWT
- Length: 142 m (465 ft 11 in)
- Beam: 25 m (82 ft 0 in)
- Decks: 4
- Installed power: 2 x MAN 7L48/60CR
- Propulsion: Two shafts with propellers
- Speed: 21 knots (39 km/h; 24 mph)
- Capacity: 2,166 lane metres; 151 trailers; 12 passengers

Precision is a ro-ro freight ferry that entered service with Seatruck Ferries in July 2012. She currently operates for CLdN.

The vessel was on charter to Stena Line for 6 years from Seatruck Ferries, during which she was named Stena Precision.

== History ==
She is one of four ships being constructed by Flensburger Schiffbau-Gesellschaft, Germany. Precision is the final newbuild to be completed.

The vessel was launched in March 2012. The vessel was christened by Lynn McBurney, the wife of McBurney Transport's Norman McBurney.

The vessel entered service on the Liverpool to Dublin route on 10 July 2012.

In September 2012 Seatruck Precision along with sister ship Seatruck Performance began a charter to Stena Line, during which, she was renamed Stena Precision. They were deployed on the Belfast to Heysham route during the charter. The charter ended August 2018.

In September 2022, CLdN bought out Seatruck Ferries' shares from the Clipper Group and as a result the whole fleet was also bought. Seatruck Ferries became defunct in February 2024, with all vessels being incorporated into the CLdN fleet.

She was renamed Precision in March 2025 to be fully incorporated into the CLdN branding.

== Description ==
Precision is one of four RoRo 2200 freight ferries, which was the largest ships in the Seatruck fleet. They are the largest ships to operate out of the port of Heysham.

The RoRo 2200 vessels have a freight capacity of 2,166 lane metres over four decks, carrying 151 trailers. Propulsion is provided by two MAN engines and twin screws.

== Sister Vessels ==
- Seatruck Performance
- Seatruck Power
- Seatruck Progress
