= MV Highland Trader =

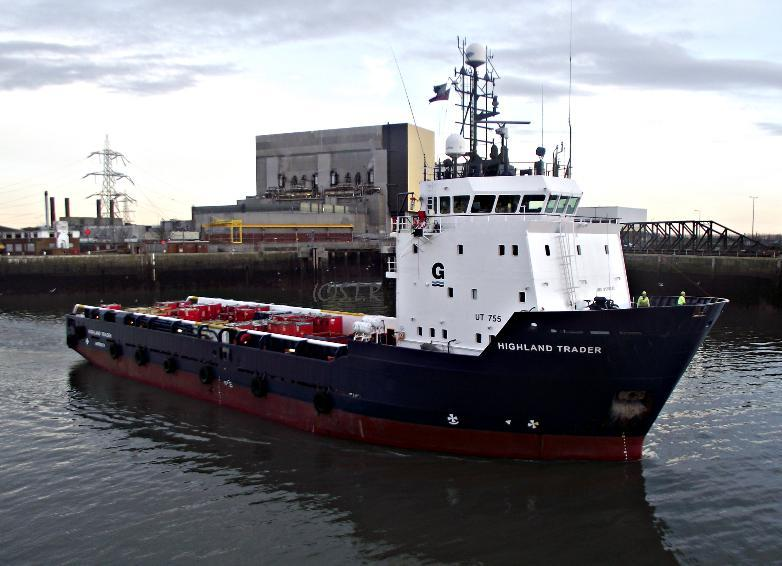
- MV Highland Trader in Heysham Port in February 2012

History
- Name: Highland Trader
- Operator: Gulf Offshore N.S. Ltd
- Port of registry: UK
- Builder: Brattvaag Skipsverft, Norway
- Christened: MV Safe Truck
- Completed: 1996
- Identification: Call sign: MWIX3; IMO number: 9136242; MMSI no. 234196000

General characteristics
- Class & type: UT755
- Tonnage: 1,969 GT
- Length: 67 m (219 ft 10 in)
- Beam: 16 m (52 ft 6 in)
- Draught: 5.9 m (19 ft 4 in)
- Speed: 12.1 knots (22.4 km/h; 13.9 mph) (max); 11 knots (20 km/h; 13 mph) (average)

MV Highland Trader took over the Highland Pioneer on the Liverpool and Morecambe Bay production support charter for BHP and Centrica.
