= Abana (barque) =

Wrecked ship

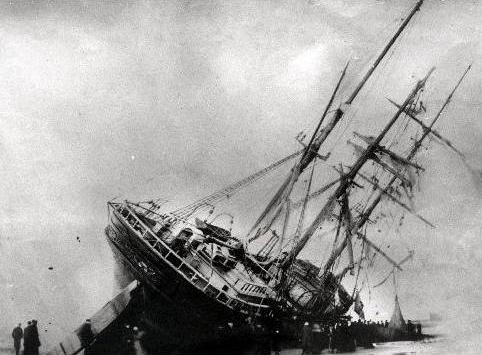
- Abana, wrecked at Blackpool.

History
- Name: Abana
- Builder: Built at New Brunswick, Canada
- Launched: 1874
- In service: 1874
- Home port: (Canada) Saint John, New Brunswick (1874– ); Norway ( –1894)
- Fate: Wrecked 22 December 1894, 130 years ago

General characteristics
- Tonnage: 1,257 tons
- Propulsion: Sails
- Sail plan: Barque
- Crew: 17

The Abana was a Canadian built sailing barque wrecked at Blackpool in England on 22 December 1894. Earlier in 1894, the ships ownership had transferred to Norwegian based Larsen Ludwig & Co. All 17 members of the crew were saved by the Blackpool lifeboat. The shipwreck can be seen in low tides from Little Bispham.

== History ==
Abana was built by Hilyards Bros, at Saint John, New Brunswick, Canada in 1874. She was originally homeported at Saint John, New Brunswick. By 1894, she was flying the Norwegian flag after being sold in Hamburg to Larsen Ludwig & Co. on 9 May 1894.

== Loss ==
The Abana was sailing from Liverpool to the United States when she was caught in a storm in the Irish Sea. She was spotted at 3pm drifting in a northwesterly direction with her sails torn to shreds. The crew mistook Blackpool Tower for a lighthouse and the ship was first spotted foundering at North Pier, and ended up drifting north and was wrecked off Little Bispham at 5pm. Flares were fired and the lifeboat was called out. The alarm was raised by the landlord of the Cleveleys Hotel. Due to the weather conditions, the Blackpool lifeboat Samuel Fletcher had to be taken some 7 miles (11 km) overland to Bispham before it could be launched. The lifeboat had a crew of 16, and the Abana had a crew of 17, all of whom were taken on board along with the ship's dog, which belonged to Captain Adolph B. Danielsen. The lifeboat grounded on a sandbank whilst returning to shore, but some of the crew members pushed the boat afloat and they managed to reach shore safely. All were taken to the Red Lion Inn to recover from their ordeal. The ship's bell and dog were given to the landlord of the Cleveleys Hotel, who had raised the alarm.

== Shipwreck ==
The wreckage of the Abana can still be seen at low tide at Little Bispham and the ship's bell hangs in St. Andrew's Church in Cleveleys. On 31 January 2008, the Riverdance beached within sight of the remains of the Abana.
