= Seatruck Performance =

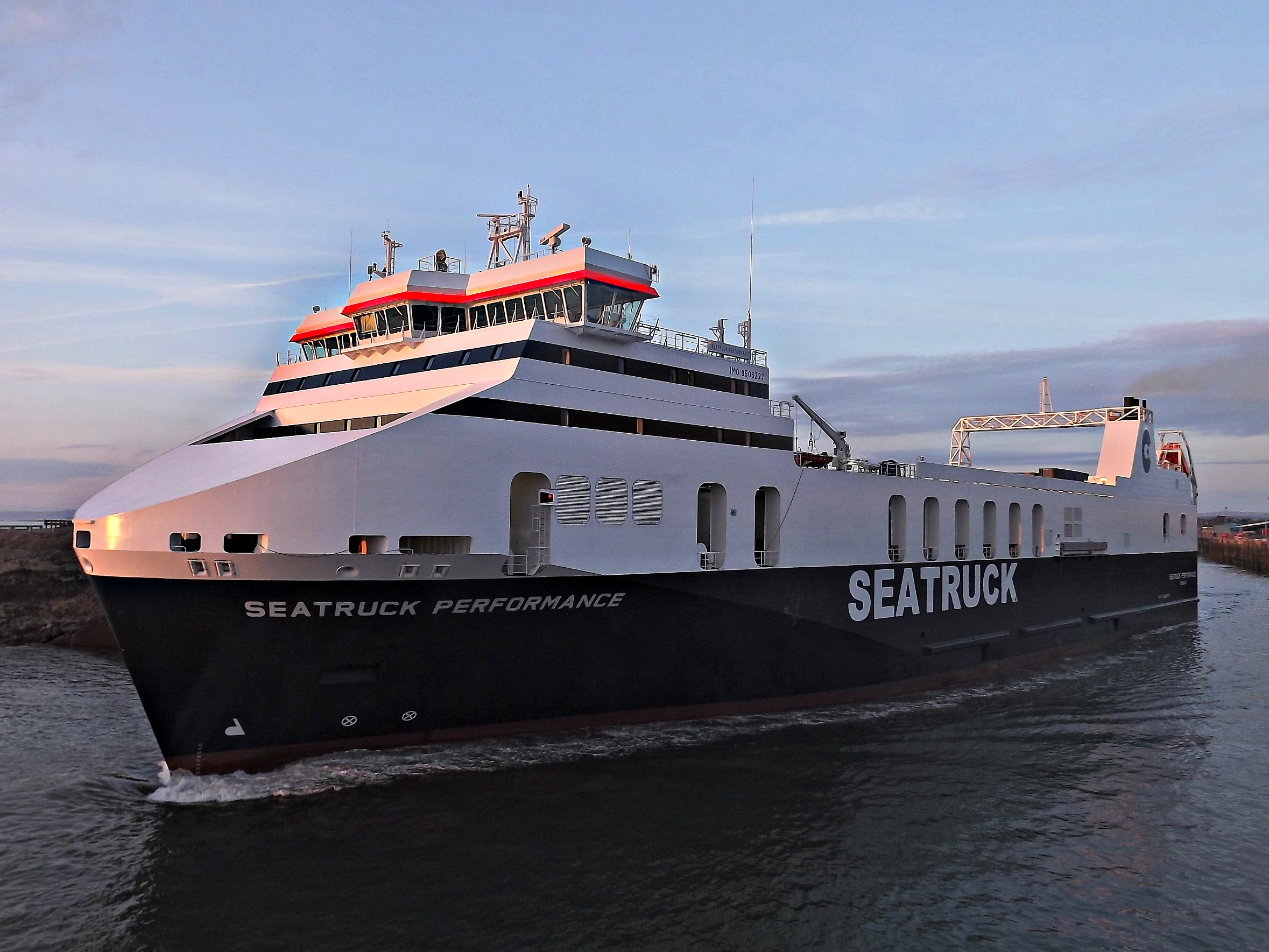
- Leaving Heysham Port

History
- Name: Seatruck Performance (2012); Stena Performer (2012 - 2018); Seatruck Performance (2018 - 2025); Performance (2025 -)
- Owner: Seatruck Ferries (2012 - 2022); CLdN (2022 - )
- Operator: Seatruck Ferries (2012, 2018 - 2024); Stena Line (2012 - 2018); CLdN (2024 - )
- Port of registry: (Isle of Man) Douglas (2012 - 2024); (Malta) Valletta (2024 - )
- Route: Belfast - Heysham (2012 - 2015); Liverpool - Dublin; Heysham - Warrenpoint
- Builder: Flensburger Schiffbau-Gesellschaft, Flensburg, Germany
- Yard number: 751
- Laid down: 31 October 2011
- Launched: 12 January 2012
- Acquired: 16 April 2012
- Maiden voyage: 23 April 2012
- Identification: IMO number: 9506227; MMSI number: 235091111; Callsign: 2FGR4

General characteristics
- Class & type: RoRo 2200
- Tonnage: 18,920 GT; 5,255 DWT
- Length: 142 m (465 ft 11 in)
- Beam: 25 m (82 ft 0 in)
- Decks: 4
- Installed power: 2 x MAN 7L48/60CR of 8,400kw (11,265bhp) each
- Propulsion: Two shafts with propellers
- Speed: 21 knots (39 km/h; 24 mph)
- Capacity: 2,166 lane metres; 151 trailers; 12 passengers

Performance is a ro-ro freight ferry that entered service with Seatruck Ferries April in 2012. She currently operates for CLdN.

The vessel was on charter to Stena Line for 6 years from Seatruck Ferries, during which she was named Stena Performer.

In September 2022, CLdN bought out Seatruck Ferries' shares from the Clipper Group and as a result the whole fleet was also bought. Seatruck Ferries became defunct in February 2024, with all vessels being incorporated into the CLdN fleet.

She was renamed Performance in April 2025 to be fully incorporated into the CLdN branding.

== History ==
She is one of four ships built by Flensburger Schiffbau-Gesellschaft, Germany. The vessel is the third newbuild to be completed.

The vessel was launched in January 2012. The vessel was christened by Virginia O'Reilly, the wife of O'Reilly Transport Ltd (Ireland)'s managing director Eugene O'Reilly. The ship was completed and handed over on 16 April 2012. Seatruck Performance entered service on the Heysham to Dublin route on 23 April 2012.

In September 2012 Seatruck Performance along with sister ship Seatruck Precision went on charter to Stena Line and was renamed Stena Performer.

On Monday 7 September 2015, the vessel will transfer to the Liverpool to Belfast service, in order to increase freight on the popular route. Stena Hibernia (currently operating the Liverpool service), will take over Performer's route.

In September 2022, CLdN bought out Seatruck Ferries' shares from the Clipper Group and as a result the whole fleet was also bought. Seatruck Ferries became defunct in February 2024, with all vessels being incorporated into the CLdN fleet.

== Description ==
Stena Performer is one of four RoRo 2200 freight ferries, which was the largest ships in the Seatruck fleet. They are the largest ships to operate out of the port of Heysham.

The RoRo 2200 vessels have a freight capacity of 2,166 lane metres over four decks, carrying 151 trailers. Propulsion is provided by two MAN engines and twin screws.

== Sister Vessels ==
- Seatruck Power
- Seatruck Precision
- Seatruck Progress
