= Seatruck Point =

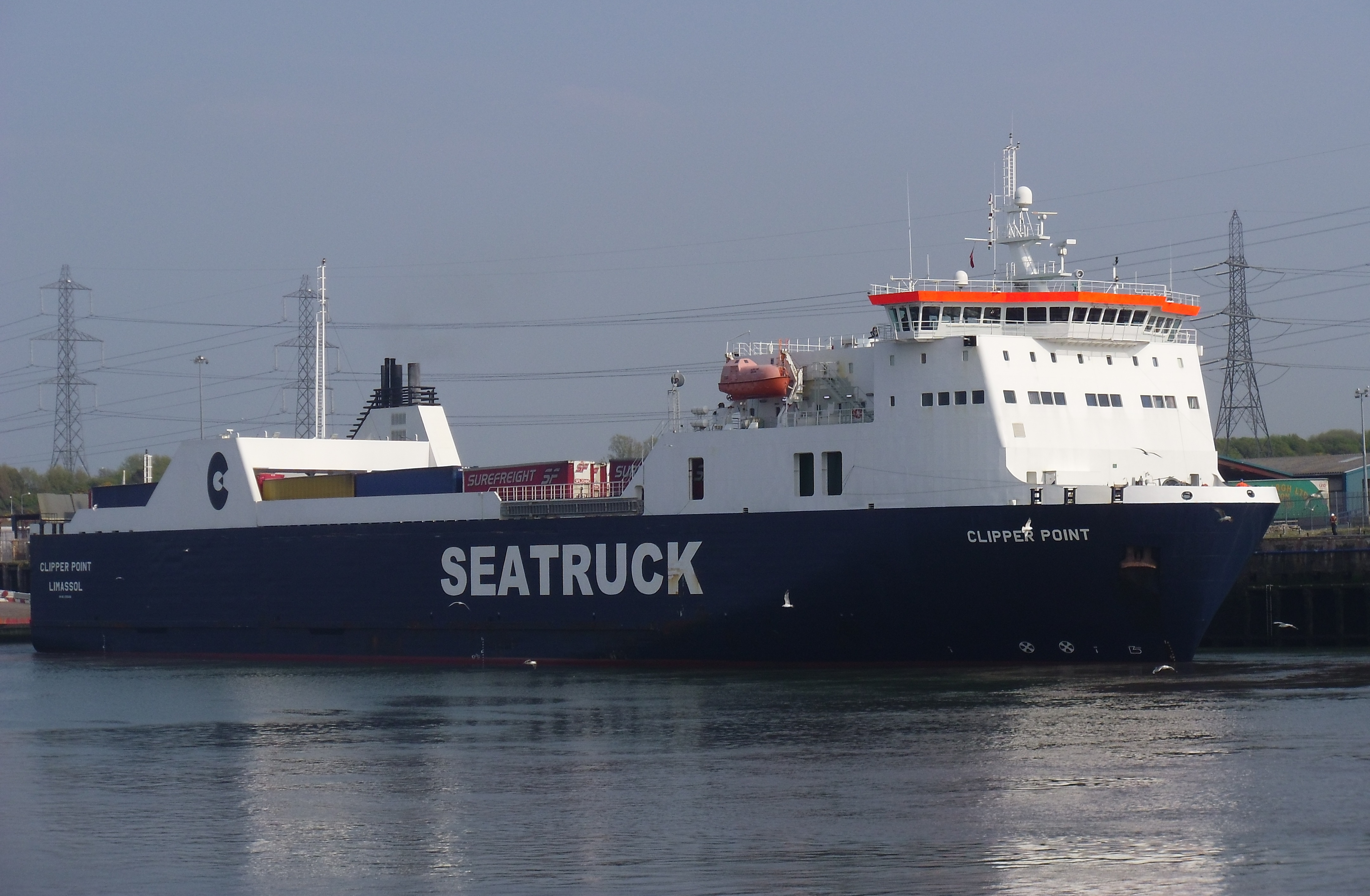
- Seatruck Point at Heysham 1/4/2011

History
- Name: Clipper Point (2008–2022); Seatruck Point (Since December 2022)
- Owner: Seatruck Ferries (2012–2022); CLdN (2022– )
- Operator: Seatruck Ferries (2012–2024); CLdN (2024– )
- Port of registry: (Cyprus) Limassol
- Route: Dublin – Liverpool; Heysham – Warrenpoint
- Builder: Astilleros de Huelva, Spain
- Yard number: 820
- Launched: 9 September 2006
- Christened: 7 October 2006
- In service: 21 March 2008
- Identification: IMO number: 9350666; MMSI number: 212375000; Callsign: C4YV2
- Status: In Service

General characteristics
- Class & type: P Series
- Tonnage: 14,759 GT; 6,500 DWT
- Length: 142 m (465 ft 11 in)
- Beam: 23.03 m (75 ft 7 in)
- Draft: 5.20 m (17 ft 1 in)
- Decks: 3 vehicle decks
- Installed power: 2 × Wärtsilä 8l46 diesel engines; (18,480 kilowatts (24,780 hp))
- Propulsion: 2 × propellers; 2 × Wärtsilä CT200 bow thrusters
- Speed: 22 knots (25 mph)
- Capacity: 12 passengers; 120 trailers
- Crew: 23

Seatruck Point is owned and operated by CLdN RoRo. Built by Spanish shipyard Astilleros de Huelva, Clipper Point entered service on 21 March 2008 with Seatruck Ferries.

== History ==
Seatruck Point was launched in 2006, and christened on 7 October. She is the first of four "P Series" ships for Seatruck Ferries. Her speed of 22 knots (41 km/h) enables crossing times between Liverpool and Dublin to be reduced to six hours. Older ships like the Riverdance and Moondance took nine and a half hours to do the same journey.

In May 2012, Seatruck Point was chartered to DFDS, operating on the Cuxhaven–Immingham route.

In September 2022, CLdN bought out Seatruck Ferries' shares from the Clipper Group and as a result the whole fleet was also bought. Seatruck Ferries became defunct in February 2024, with all vessels being incorporated into the CLdN fleet.

== Description ==
Seatruck Point is one of four "P Series" ro-ro freight ferries. It has a length of 142 metres (466 ft), a beam of 23 metres (75 ft) and a draft of 5.7 metres (19 ft). Det Norske Veritas class the vessel as a 1A1 General Cargo Carrier – with whom Clipper Point is allocated the number 26467.

The vessel is designed to fit in Heysham harbour. Trailers are carried over three decks.

The vessel is powered by two Wärtsilä 8L46 diesel engines which drive two controllable pitch propellers. The vessel is also equipped with two Wärtsilä CT200 bow thrusters.

== Sister Vessels ==
- Clipper Pace
- Clipper Panorama
- Clipper Pennant
