= Seatruck Progress =

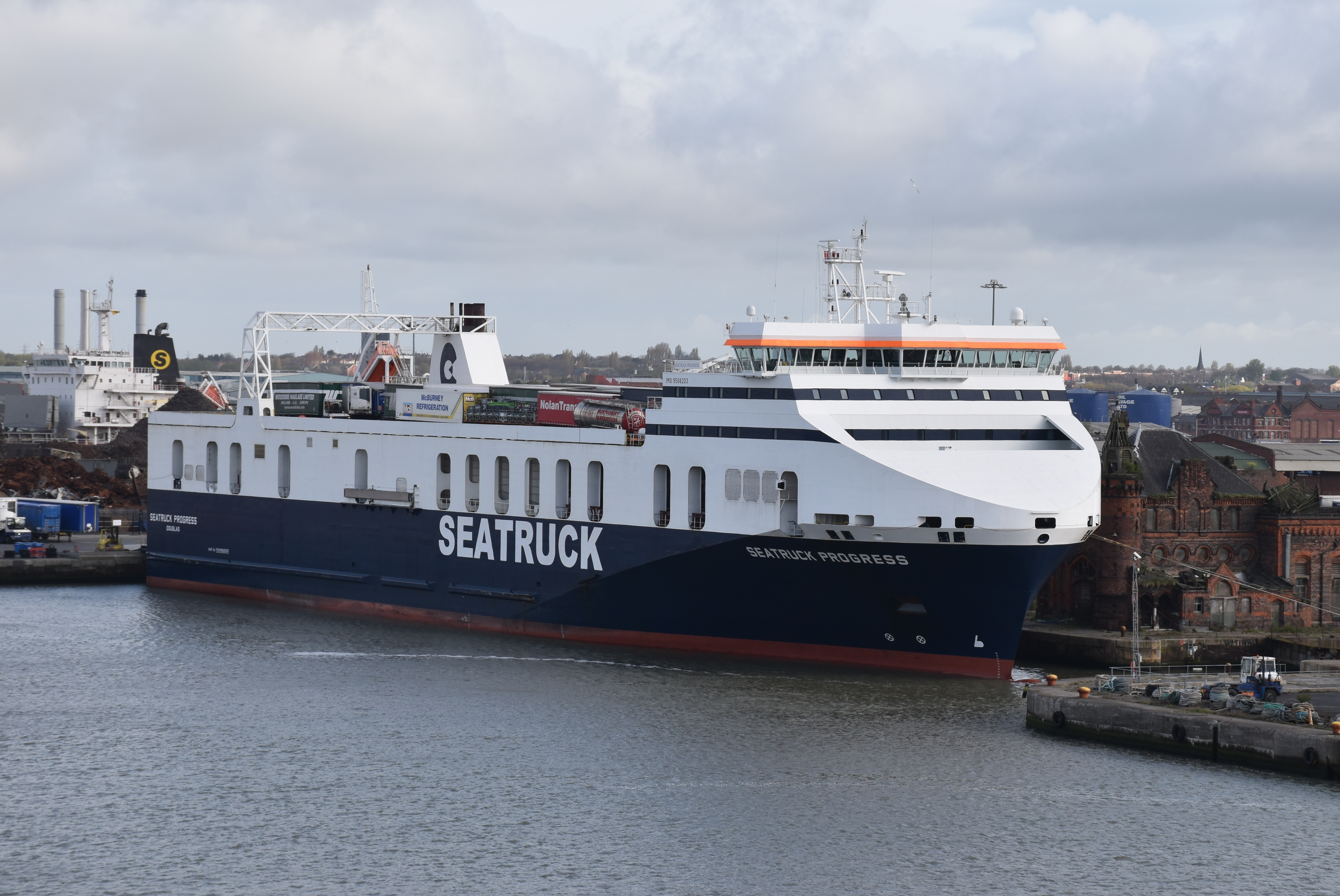
- Seatruck Progress in Liverpool

History
- Name: Seatruck Progress (2011 - 2025); Progress (2025 - )
- Owner: Seatruck Ferries (2012 - 2022); CLdN (2022 - )
- Operator: Seatruck Ferries (2012 - 2024); CLdN (2024 - )
- Port of registry: (Isle of Man) Douglas (2012 - 2024); (Malta) Valletta (2024 - )
- Route: Dublin - Liverpool
- Builder: Flensburger Schiffbau-Gesellschaft, Flensburg, Germany
- Yard number: 746
- Launched: 19 August 2011
- Completed: November 2011
- Acquired: 29 November 2011
- In service: 20 December 2011
- Identification: IMO number: 9506203

General characteristics
- Class & type: RoRo 2200
- Tonnage: 18,920 GT; 5,255 DWT
- Length: 142 m (465 ft 11 in)
- Beam: 25 m (82 ft 0 in)
- Decks: 4
- Installed power: 2 x MAN 7L48/60CR
- Propulsion: Two shafts with propellers
- Speed: 21 knots (39 km/h; 24 mph)
- Capacity: 2,166 lane metres; 151 trailers; 12 passengers

Progress is a ro-ro freight ferry that entered service with Seatruck Ferries in December 2011. She currently operates for CLdN.

== History ==
She is one of four ships built by Flensburger Schiffbau-Gesellschaft, Germany. Progress was the first new build to be completed; the last is expected to be launched in June 2012.

Progress was launched on 19 August 2011 and was christened by Karen Donaldson, the Head of Finance at Seatruck Ferries. The ship was completed in November 2011 and was delivered to Seatruck in December.

On 20 December 2011, Progress made her maiden voyage for Seatruck. In September 2012, Progress went on charter to DFDS Seaways before returning to service with Seatruck on the Liverpool to Dublin route.

In September 2022, CLdN bought out Seatruck Ferries' shares from the Clipper Group and as a result the whole fleet was also bought. Seatruck Ferries became defunct in February 2024, with all vessels being incorporated into the CLdN fleet.

She was renamed Progress in March 2025 to be fully incorporated into the CLdN branding.

== Description ==
Progress is one of four RoRo 2200 freight ferries, which was the largest ships in the Seatruck fleet. They are the largest ships to operate out of the port of Heysham.

The RoRo 2200 vessels have a freight capacity of 2,166 lane metres over four decks, carrying 151 trailers. Propulsion is provided by two MAN engines and twin screws.

== Sister Vessels ==
- Seatruck Performance
- Seatruck Precision
- Seatruck Power
