= Seatruck Panorama =

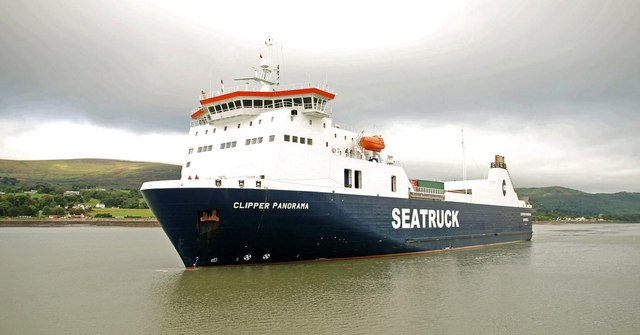
- Seatruck Panorama (as Clipper Panorama) at Warrenpoint

History
- Name: Clipper Panorama (2007-2011); Seatruck Panorama (2011-2024); Santa Rita (2024-present)
- Owner: Transportación Marítima de California
- Port of registry: (Cyprus) Limassol
- Ordered: 13 March 2007
- Builder: Astilleros de Huelva, Spain
- Yard number: 822
- Laid down: 13 March 2007
- Launched: 12 December 2007
- Completed: 13 November 2008
- In service: 25 January 2009
- Identification: IMO number: 9372676; MMSI number: 212392000; Callsign: XCCG8

General characteristics
- Class & type: P Series
- Tonnage: 14,759 GT; 6,500 DWT
- Length: 142 m (465 ft 11 in)
- Beam: 23.03 m (75 ft 7 in)
- Draft: 5.20 m (17 ft 1 in)
- Decks: 3 vehicle decks
- Installed power: 2 × Wärtsilä 4L20 diesel engines; (16,000 kilowatts (21,000 hp))
- Propulsion: 2 × propellers; 2 × Wärtsilä CT200 bow thrusters
- Speed: 22 knots (25 mph)
- Capacity: 12 passengers; 120 trailers
- Crew: 23

Santa Rita is a ro-ro freight ferry operated by Transportación Marítima de California.

The vessel was built in 2008 by Spanish shipyard Astilleros de Huelva as Clipper Panorama. The vessel entered service in January 2009.

== History ==
Clipper Panorama was built by Astilleros de Huelva, Spain as yard number 822. Her keel was laid on 13 March 2007 and she was launched on 27 December, with completion on 13 November 2008. Homeported in Limassol, Cyprus, she is employed on Seatruck's Heysham - Warrenpoint route. Clipper Panorama entered service on 25 January 2009, replacing Moondance which was redeployed onto a new route. In December 2011, Clipper Panorama was renamed Seatruck Panorama.

Seatruck Panorama was on charter to Stena Line from 2 September 2020 to September 2021 and 20 December 2021 to 4 September 2023. During these periods she operated the Belfast - Heysham, Belfast - Birkenhead and Rosslare - Cherbourg routes.

== Description ==
Seatruck Panorama is one of four "P Series" ro-ro freight ferries. It has a length of 142 metres (465 ft 11 in), a beam of 23 metres (75 ft 6 in) and a draught of 5.7 metres (18 ft 8 in). Det Norske Veritas class the vessel as a 1A1 General Cargo Carrier - with whom Seatruck Panorama is allocated the number 27191.

The vessel is designed to fit in Heysham harbour ("Heysham max"). Trailers are carried over three decks.

The vessel is powered by two Wärtsilä 4L20 diesel engines which drive two propellers. The vessel is also equipped with two Wärtsilä CT200 bow thrusters.

== Sister Vessels ==
- Seatruck Pace
- UR
- Seatruck Point
