= Jordan Academy for Maritime Studies =

Jordanian private university

- الأكاديمية الأردنية للدراسات البحرية
- Type: Private
- Established: 2002
- President: Prof. Mustafa Mossad
- Academic staff: 54
- Location: Amman, Jordan
- Campus: Urban 0.04 square kilometres (9.9 acres)
- Colors: Dark Red and Royal Blue
- Website: jams.edu.jo

Jordan Academy for Maritime Studies (الأكاديمية الأردنية للدراسات البحرية) is a private educational institution located in Amman, Jordan. It was established in 2002, with 30% of its share being owned by the Arab Bridge Maritime company. The first scholastic year started in fall 2004. The academy offers two-year degrees in Nautical Studies. It is accredited by the Jordan Maritime Authority.

== Programs ==
- Navigation Officer program
- Engineering Officer program
