= Iosif K =

Ship built in 1979

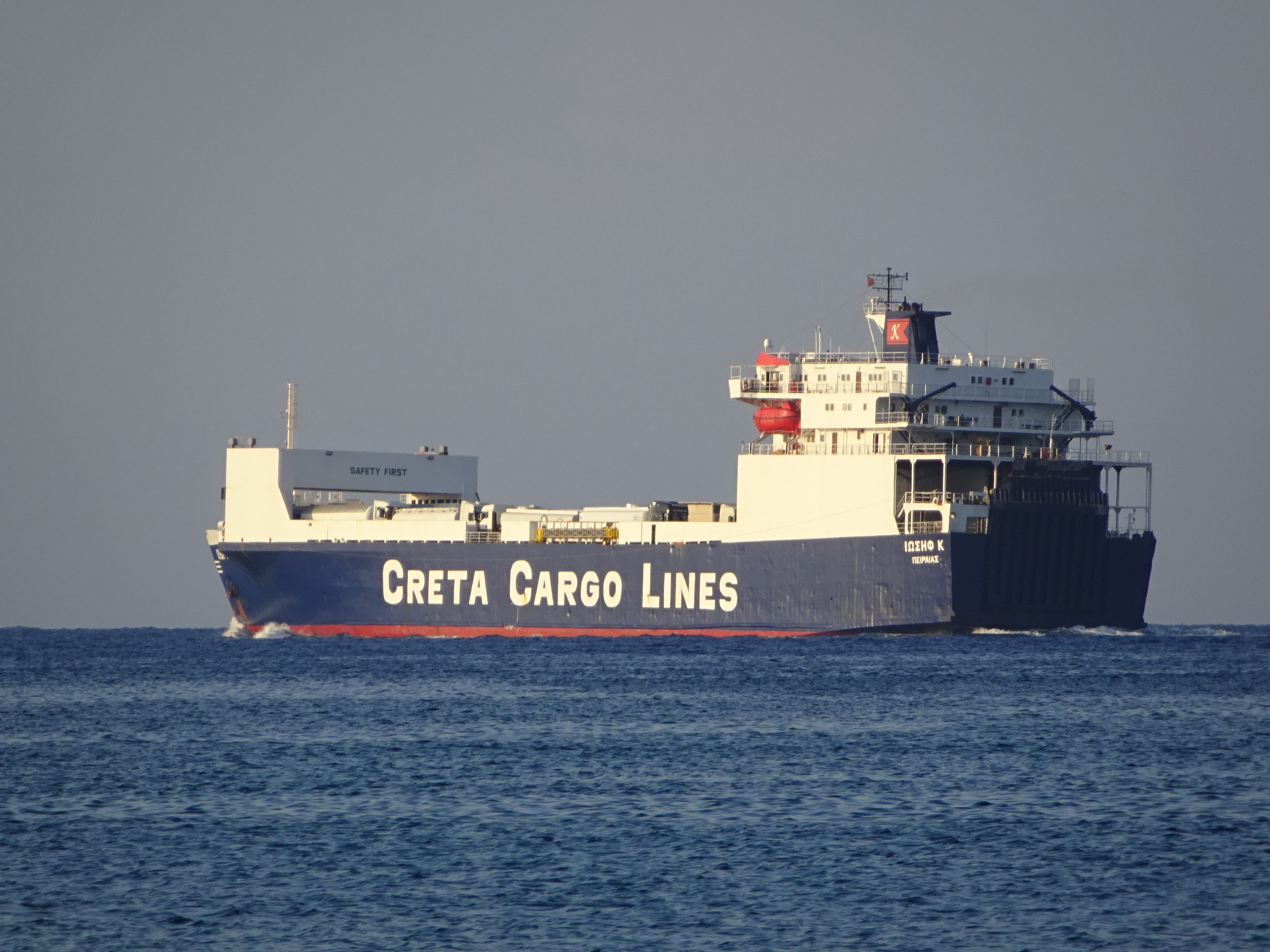
- Iosif K departing Rhodes

History

Greece
- Name: Norwegian Challenger (1979–1982); Jolly Bruno (1982–1993); Merchant Brilliant (1993–2008); Zoya (2008–2015); Bekaa Dream (2015–2020); Iosif K (2020 – present)
- Owner: Steineger & Wik 1979 – 1982; Medorient Shipping Line Inc. 1982 – 1993; Merchant Ferries 1993 – 2002; Cenargo International Plc. 2002 – 2004; Brilliant Shipping Ltd. 2004 – 2020; Creta Cargo Lines 2020 – onwards
- Operator: Norient Line 1980 – 1981; OT Africal Line 1981 – 1982; Ignazio Messina 1982 – 1993; Merchant Ferries 1993 – 2002; Norse Merchant Ferries 2002 – 2005; Cobelfret 2005; Norse Merchant Ferries 2005 – 2006; Norfolk Line 2006 – 2007; Scandlines 2007 – 2008; Norfolk Line 2007 - 2008; Seatruck Ferries 2008 – 2008; P&O Irish Sea 2008 – 2008; Isle of Man Steam Packet Company 2008 – 2012; Williston Impex Co 2012 – 2015; Avantis Maritime Co-Mai 2015 – 2018; Bekaa Dream Shipping Offshore 2018 – 2020; Creta Cargo Lines 2020 – present
- Port of registry: 1979–1982: Oslo, Norway; 1982–1993: Italy; 1993–2004: Nassau, Bahamas; 2004–2008: Montego Bay, Jamaica; 2008–2014: Belize City, Belize; 2014–2015: Lomé, Togo; 2015–2018: Malakal Harbour Palau; 2018–2019: Beirut, Lebanon; 2019–2020: Panama Panama; 2020 onwards: Piraeus, Greece
- Builder: Vaagen Verft A/S, Kyrksæterøra, Norway
- Yard number: 43
- Laid down: 1 May 1978
- Launched: 1 April 1979
- Completed: 1 July 1979
- Identification: Call sign: SVCV2; IMO number: 7724265; MMSI number: 241694000
- Status: In service

General characteristics
- Tonnage: 9,368 GT
- Length: 133.07 m (436 ft 7 in)
- Beam: 21.65 m (71 ft 0 in)
- Draught: 5.03 m (16 ft 6 in)
- Ice class: ICE C
- Installed power: 2 × Krupp 12M453AK 12-cylinder diesel engines, 6,620 kilowatts (8,880 hp)
- Speed: 17 knots (31 km/h)
- Capacity: 12 passengers, 1,272 m (4,173 ft) freight lanes, 80 trailers, 524 TEU.
- Crew: 18

Iosif K is a 133-metre Ro-Ro cargo ship operated by the Greek shipping company Creta Cargo Lines. Built in 1979 by Vaagen Verft A/S in Kyrksæterøra, Norway, as Norwegian Challenger, she spent her earlier career serving various international charterers across Northern Europe, the Irish Sea, and the Mediterranean under names such as Merchant Brilliant, Zoya, and Bekaa Dream. Acquired by Creta Cargo Lines in 2020 and registered in Piraeus, the 9,464 GT vessel currently supplies vital freight and vehicle transport services connecting mainland Greece with Crete and the Aegean Islands.

== History ==
The ship was launched as Norwegian Challenger in 1978, originally owned by Steineger & Wik. She was chartered by Norient Line from 1980 to 1981 and then by OT Africa Line from 1981 to 1982. She was sold to Medorient Shipping Lines and renamed Jolly Bruno in 1982 and chartered to Ignazio Messina until 1993, when she was sold to Merchant Ferries. In 2002 she was sold to Cenargo International PLC and chartered to Norse Merchant Ferries. In 2004 she was sold to Brilliant Shipping Ltd, remaining on charter with Norse Merchant Ferries until 2005, when she was on short term charter to Cobelfret Ferries, resuming service with Norse Merchant Ferries later in the year until 2006, when she was chartered to Norfolk Line

Merchant Brilliant in Dublin

On 14 December 2006, Merchant Brilliant was placed under arrest in Dublin after the International Transport Workers' Federation (ITF) obtained a warrant at the High Court, claiming that the Russian and Latvian crew were owed tens of thousands of Euros in unpaid wages. An inspector from the ITF met with representatives of the owner in Dublin on 19 December 2006 to discuss the case. The company agreed to pay the back wages, and the High Court lifted its order preventing the ship from leaving port. The owners then refused crew members permission to go ashore unless the money paid was returned. Eight crew members left the ship. A further dispute about the payment of arrears owed to the crew broke out in February 2007. The ship was moored off Heysham, having sailed from Belfast. The crew were promised payment if they sailed back to Belfast, but eleven of the eighteen crew decided to leave. Norfolk Line had taken the ship off charter on arrival at Heysham as the ship was not being operated in accordance with the charter agreement. The Harbour Master ordered Iosif K to leave port to make way for incoming ships. The stand-off lasted for four days before the dispute was settled. Those crew wishing to leave were flown home and a new Russian crew flown in to operate her. A total of US$137,000 was paid to the crew in back pay. She was chartered by Scandlines in 2007 and then by Norfolk Line again in 2008. In January 2008 she was chartered by Seatruck Ferries for use on the Heysham - Warrenpoint route. Later that year she was chartered to P&O Irish Sea and the Isle of Man Steam Packet Company. On Decembder 2019 Bekaa Dream arrived at Piraeus, Greece and laid up in Drapetsona. In February 2020 Bekaa Dream bought from the Greek company Creta Cargo Lines and named it Iosif K.
