= Seatruck Power =

Roll-on / roll-off freight ferry

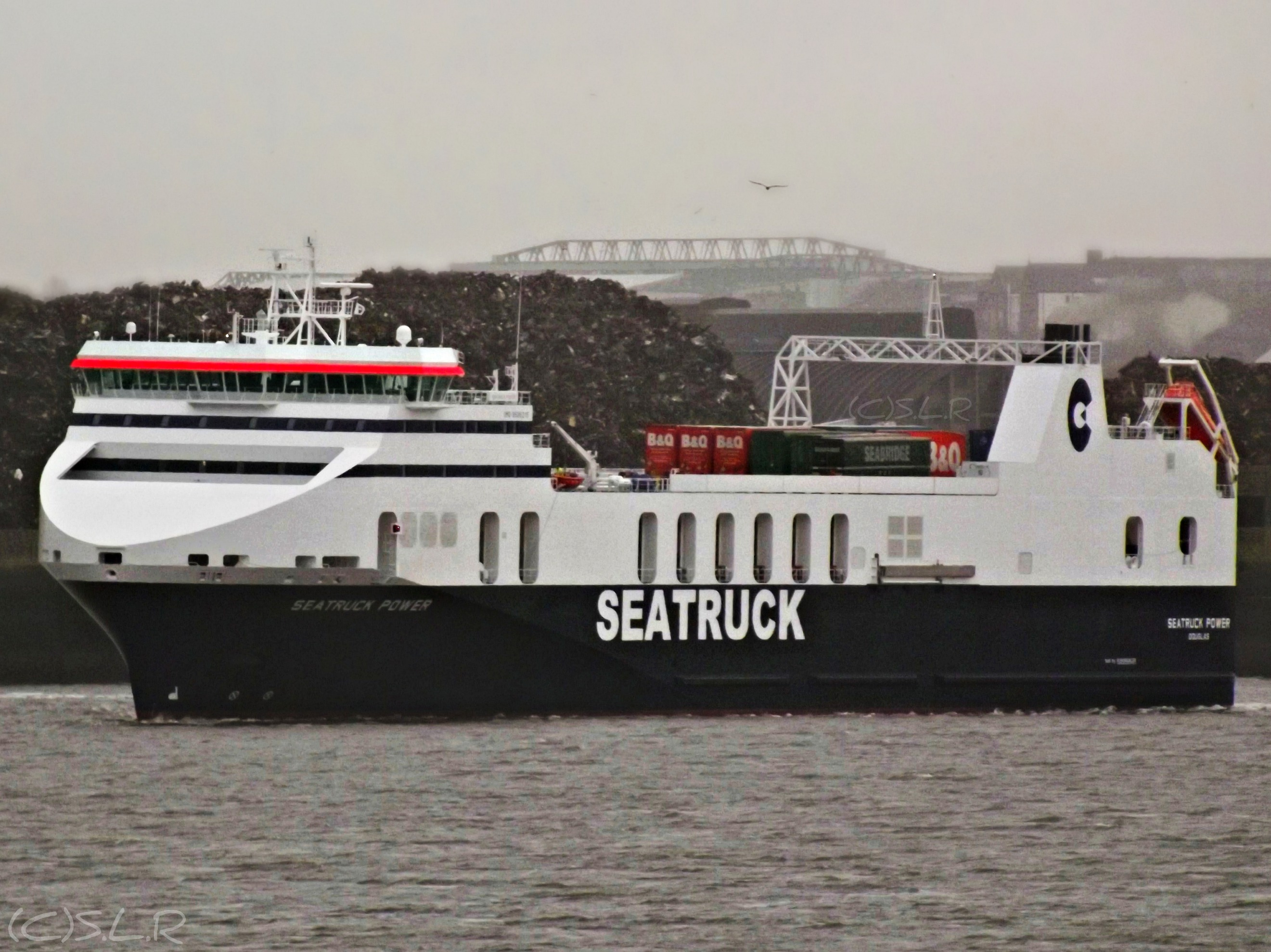
- Power's Maiden Voyage to Dublin from Liverpool

History
- Name: "Power (2025-Present)" Seatruck Power (2012-2025)
- Owner: Seatruck Ferries (2012 - 2022); CLdN (2022 - )
- Operator: Seatruck Ferries (2012 - 2024); CLdN (2024 - )
- Port of registry: (Isle of Man) Douglas (2012 - 2024); (Malta) Valletta (2024 - )
- Route: Dublin - Heysham
- Builder: Flensburger Schiffbau-Gesellschaft, Flensburg, Germany
- Yard number: 747
- Laid down: 22 August 2011
- Launched: 28 October 2011
- Acquired: 3 February 2012
- In service: 14 February 2012
- Identification: IMO number: 9506215

General characteristics
- Class & type: RoRo 2200
- Tonnage: 18,920 GT; 5,255 DWT
- Length: 142 m (465 ft 11 in)
- Beam: 25 m (82 ft 0 in)
- Decks: 4
- Installed power: 2 x MAN 7L48/60CR
- Propulsion: Two shafts with propellers
- Speed: 21 knots (39 km/h; 24 mph)
- Capacity: 2,166 lane metres; 151 trailers; 12 passengers

Power is a ro-ro freight ferry that entered service with Seatruck Ferries in February 2012. She currently operates for CLdN.

== History ==
She is one of four ships built by Flensburger Schiffbau-Gesellschaft, Germany. Seatruck Power is the second newbuild to be completed.

Seatruck Power was launched in October 2011 and was christened by Niamh McManus, the wife of Surefreight's Brian McManus. The ship was completed and handed over on 3 February 2012. Seatruck Power entered service on the Liverpool to Dublin route on 14 February 2012.

In September 2022, CLdN bought out Seatruck Ferries' shares from the Clipper Group and as a result the whole fleet was also bought. Seatruck Ferries became defunct in February 2024, with all vessels being incorporated into the CLdN fleet.

== Description ==
Seatruck Power is one of four RoRo 2200 freight ferries, which was the largest ships in the Seatruck fleet. They are the largest ships to operate out of the port of Heysham.

The RoRo 2200 vessels have a freight capacity of 2,166 lane metres over four decks, carrying 151 trailers. Propulsion is provided by two MAN engines and twin screws.

== Sister Vessels ==
- Seatruck Performance
- Seatruck Precision
- Seatruck Progress
