= MS Lygra =

Ship built in 1978

History
- Name: Lygra
- Owner: Artic Shipping & Finance; Førde Municipality, Norway
- Operator: Maritime Management Leikanger, Norway
- Port of registry: Saint Kitts and Nevis
- Route: Florida - Caribbean - Congo
- Builder: Glommen Mekaniske Verksteder AS, Norway
- Yard number: 194
- Launched: 3 October 1978
- Identification: IMO number: 7704629
- Fate: Scrapped 2018

General characteristics
- Tonnage: 7,012 tons
- Length: 113 m (371 ft)
- Beam: 19 m (62 ft)
- Draught: 4.6 m (15 ft)
- Speed: 11.7 knots (21.7 km/h; 13.5 mph)

Lygra was a RoRo vessel launched on 3 October 1978 at Glommen Mekaniske Verksteder AS, Norway. She was broken up for scrap at Alang on 25 February 2018.
