= Lady Roz =

Ship built in 1978

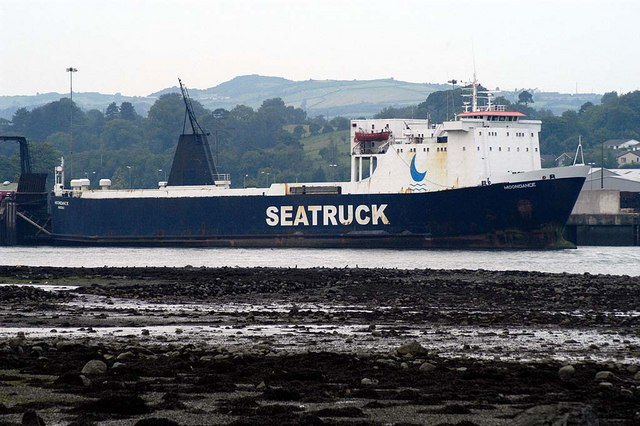
- Sevenhill at Warrenpoint in July 2003 as Moondance

History

Cameroon
- Name: Emadala (1978-1993); Merchant Victor (1993-1997); Moondance (1997- 2010); Kibris Gunesi (2010-2012); Sevenhill (2012-2017); Tiger A (2017-2021); Luccello(2021-March 2022); Victory RoRo (March-August 2022); Lady Roz (August 2022-present)
- Owner: Emadala Shipping Co. (1978-87); Gilnavi (1987-90); Cenargo Ltd. (1990-98); Seatruck Ferries (1998-2010); Starline Maritime (2010-2012); Sevenhill Maritime (2012-2017); Awesta SG Corp (2017-2021); Mered Ship Management Co., Turkey (2021-2022); Yildirim Shipping Co. (2022-present)
- Operator: Legend Line
- Builder: Rickmers Rederei G.m.b.H, Bremerhaven, Germany.
- Yard number: 395
- Launched: 19 July 1978
- Identification: IMO number: 7800112

General characteristics
- Tonnage: 5,646 GT
- Length: 112.32 m (368 ft 6 in)
- Beam: 17.43 m (57 ft 2 in)
- Draught: 5.36 m (17 ft 7 in)
- Installed power: 2 × MaK 8M453AK engines; 4,416 kW (5,922 hp)
- Propulsion: 2x propellers
- Speed: 16 knots (18 mph)
- Capacity: 12 passengers; 65 trailers
- Crew: 19

Lady Roz is a ro-ro freight ferry built in 1978. It is a sister ship to Riverdance. She was probably best known for its time at Seatruck Ferries, named Moondance. The vessel was originally built for Emadala Shipping.

== Career ==
=== Gilnavi (1978-90) ===
Launched in 1978 as the Emadala, she was chartered to Gilnavi and used on the Genoa-Malta-Piraeus-Alexandria route. Sevenhill was sold to Gilnavi in 1990.

=== Cencargo (1990-97) ===
In 1990, Sevenhill was sold to Cencargo in 1993, during her time with Cencargo she was named Merchant Victor. She was used on the Heysham-Warrenpoint and Ostend-Ramsgate routes until 1993, when she was chartered for use in the Caribbean. In 1994 she returned to British waters, being used on the Hull-Zeebrugge and Felixstowe-Zeebrugge routes. In 1996 she was used on the Belfast-Heysham route, and in 1997 she was used on the Portsmouth-Guernsey - Jersey route, then the Dartford - Zeebrugge route.

=== Seatruck (1997-2010) ===
In 1997 she was chartered by Seatruck Ferries, and renamed Moondance. She was purchased by Seatruck in 1998 for use on the Heysham-Warrenpoint route. In April 2008 she was awaiting a refit in Birkenhead.

On 29 June 2008 she was involved in a grounding incident at Warrenpoint after an electrical failure put the controllable pitch propellers into full astern, which was a default setting. Moondance suffered damage to her rudders and rudder stocks. An underlying cause of the accident was insufficient manning of the bridge and engine room and lax operating procedures on board Moondance. Moondance returned to service on 16 October 2008 running between Heysham and Warrenpoint. With the arrival of Seatruck Panorama, Moondance was redeployed to the newly opened Fredericia, Denmark to Moss Norway route. This route began operation on 2 February 2009.

With the suspension of Fredericia-Moss service from 10 February 2009, Moondance briefly laid up in Denmark before returning to Liverpool where she was laid up in East Huskisson dock.

=== Ownership from 2010 to Present ===
Since 2010, the vessel has been owned by six different companies in Turkey and has operated in the Black Sea, Mediterranean Sea, and Red Sea:

- 2010 - 2012: Purchased by Starline Maritime in Cyprus and renamed Kibris Gunesi.
- 2012 - 2017: Renamed Sevenhill and operated out of Samsun, Turkey, by Sevenhill RoRo.
- July 2017 - September 2021: Renamed Tiger A operated by Awesta Shipping Corp between the ports of Samsun and Tuapse, Russia.
- September 13 2021- March 15 2022: Renamed to Luccello and owned by Mered Ship Management Co, Ltd of Mersin, Turkey. On the 5th March 2022, the vessel was reportedly seized by the Libyan National Army after unloading 100 military armoured vehicles in Benghazi, Libya. This was noted by the UN Panel of Experts as a violation of the UN arms embargo.
- March - August 2022: Days after the Libya incident, the vessel was transferred to Yildirim Shipping and renamed Victory RoRo, continuing its operations in the Mediterranean and Red Seas. In July 2022, while en route from Aqaba, Jordan, it was tracked by French Navy surveillance off the Libyan coast during Operation IRINI. The ship was monitored by multiple warships, and an inspection confirmed the presence of dozens of military-modified vehicles. The vessel was detained in Marseille, France, for 3 days to unload seized vehicles before being released.
- August 19 2022 - Present: Now named Lady Roz, operated by Legend Logistics, with its primary routes between Mersin, Turkey and Jeddah, Saudi Arabia.

== See also ==
- MS Riverdance - Moondance's sister ship that sank off the coast of Blackpool, England.
