= Arab Bridge Maritime =

AB Maritime
- Type: Public
- Founded: 1985
- Headquarters: Aqaba, Jordan
- Area served: Red Sea
- Key people: Mr. Hazem Al Hafadi (Chairman)
- Revenue: US $57 million (2009)
- Operating income: US $59 million (2009)
- Total assets: US $80.0 million (2009)
- Website: http://www.abmaritime.com.jo

Arab Bridge Maritime Company (شركة الجسر العربي للملاحة) was founded in November 1985, to connect commercial routes in Asia and Africa. The company was founded by the governments of Egypt, Iraq, and Jordan.

The company has its headquarters in Aqaba and has branches in Amman and Cairo. AB Maritime also has offices in Alexandria, Sharm El Sheikh, Taba, Baghdad, Kuwait, Abu Dhabi, Mecca, Madina, Doha and Riyadh.

The company also owns 50% of the Arab Ship Management Company and 30% of the Jordan Academy for Maritime Studies.

== History ==
Arab Bridge Maritime is a joint venture between the governments of Jordan, Egypt, and Iraq. AB Maritime was founded in November 1985 with a paid-up capital of $6 million contributed equally between the three partner governments. The capital was increased from retained profits, to reach $81 million in 2011.

The company was granted an exclusive concession by the governments of Jordan and Egypt to operate the Aqaba-Nuweiba ferry service line for the transportation of passengers, goods, and vehicles of all sorts between the Arab countries in Africa and Asia.

The company started its operations with hired vessels, but AB Maritime currently owns its own fleet of six vessels with an estimated value of over $80 million and is planning to increase its fleet in the near future in order to serve the current expansion of its operations.

AB Maritime is managed by an executive team nominated by the Board of Directors.

== Executive management ==
Mr.Adnan ALabadleh Managing Director

Mr.Gamal Mohamed Ibrahim Ali Deputy Managing Director

Mr.Mohildin abdlrazaq abdlaziz Deputy managing Director

== General information ==
The launching of “Book in Advance” automated service allows the customers to book their tickets prior to the trip from any of ABM's offices in Jordan, KSA, Egypt, Syria, and Arab states of the Persian Gulf countries.

The company has contracts with agents in Syria, KSA, and the Persian Gulf countries. AB Maritime was also chosen as the agent for land and maritime Iraqi imports from Jordan.

AB Maritime also owns: 50% shares of the Arab Ship Management Ltd. 30% shares of the Jordanian Academy for Maritime Studies Permanent offices in Aqaba, Amman, and Cairo Desalination plant in Nuweiba

Shipping lines:

Ab Maritime operates in the Red Sea on the lines between: Aqaba – Nuweiba Morocco - Spain Malta - Libya

== Touristic line ==
AB Maritime introduced the services of high-speed craft “Babel”, "The Princess", and "Queen Nefertiti" with the aim of encouraging tourists to visit resorts in South Sinai's (Taba, Nuweiba, Dahab, and Sharm Al Sheikh), and also to explore the golden triangle in Jordan, including Aqaba, Rum, and Petra.

AB Maritime uses the competitive advantage of Aqaba being a tax free zone and for Petra being one of the Seven Wonders of the World throughout organizing regular touristic trips.

== Fleet ==
The company operates a fleet of eleven vessels.

The fleet operates on the lines connecting Aqaba in Jordan to Nuweiba in Egypt, and Aqaba to Taba.
