= MS Riverdance =

Scrapped, UK registered roll-on/roll-off ferry

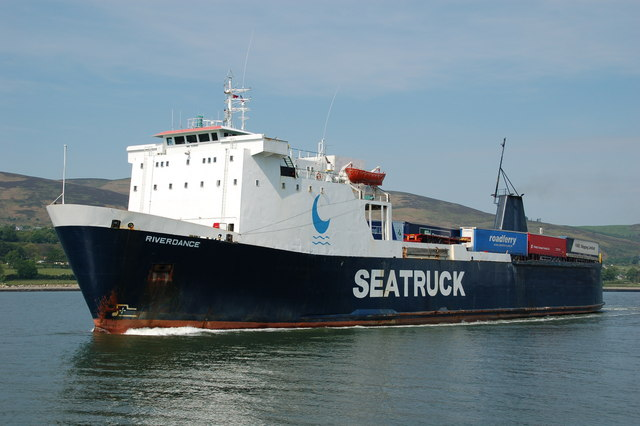

History

Bahamas
- Name: Riverdance
- Owner: Mashala Shipping Co., Hamilton, Bermuda; Seaboard (1987); Schiaffino Lines (1988); Sally Ferries; Seatruck Ferries (1997–2008)
- Operator: Crescent Marine Services Ltd
- Builder: Rickmers Reederei G.m.b.H, Bremerhaven, Germany.
- Yard number: 389
- Launched: 15th of April 1977
- Christened: Mashala
- Completed: 30th of June 1977
- Out of service: 31 January 2008
- Renamed: Halla (1987); Tikal (1988); Schiaffino (1989); Sally Eurobridge (1993); Eurobridge (1994); Sally Eurobridge (1995); Eurobridge (1996); Riverdance (1996)
- Home port: Nassau, Bahamas
- Identification: IMO number: 7635361, Callsign C6CG3
- Fate: Beached at Blackpool, Lancashire on 31 January 2008. Scrapped on-site May – October 2008.

General characteristics
- Tonnage: 6041 GRT
- Length: 116.31 m (381 ft 7 in)
- Beam: 18.22 m (59 ft 9 in)
- Draught: 5.38 m (17 ft 8 in)
- Installed power: 4,410 kilowatts (5,910 hp)
- Propulsion: 2 x MaK 8M453AK Diesel engines
- Speed: 15 knots (28 km/h)
- Capacity: 12 passengers, 65 trailers
- Crew: 19

Location where Riverdance ran aground at Blackpool, Lancashire.

Riverdance was a roll-on/roll-off ferry in service with Seatruck Ferries on the Irish Sea. On 31 January 2008 she was hit by a wave that caused her cargo to shift and she beached at Blackpool, very close to the boundary with Cleveleys. Large amounts of the ship's cargo was spilled overboard after the ship ran aground, resulting in much of it being salvaged by members of the public. Attempts to refloat her failed, and she was scrapped on site during 2008.

Her normal route was Heysham – Warrenpoint. A cargo vessel, she was permitted under UK maritime law to carry up to 12 passengers.

== History ==
Built as Mashala in 1977, renamed Halla in 1987, Tikal in 1988 and Schiaffino in 1989, she operated at first in the Mediterranean and then the Caribbean. In 1993 she was operating in the Irish Sea, renamed Sally Eurobridge. In 1994 she was operating in the North Sea under the name Eurobridge, returning to Sally Eurobridge when the charter ended. In 1995–96 she was on charter to Norfolk Line under the name Eurobridge again, then chartered to Seatruck and renamed Riverdance, being bought outright in 1997.

== Shipwreck ==
On 31 January 2008 at 19:30 she was "broadsided" by a wave, causing the cargo to shift. At 19:45 the captain sent a Mayday call. The ship was listing at 60 degrees. At 20:00 the rescue crew at RAF Valley on Anglesey was put on standby, being scrambled at 20:20. Liverpool Coastguard co-ordinated assistance. Helicopters from the Irish Coast Guard, Royal Navy and Royal Air Force attended, along with lifeboats from Lytham and Fleetwood. The Steersman assisted with communications and the support vessels Clwyd Supporter and Highland Sprite were reported to be on their way to assist. Before he was rescued, one of the passengers made an emotional, and what he thought at the time final, mobile phone call home to his wife. Starting at 21:00, eight people were airlifted from the ship, which lost one engine and drifted aground on Cleveleys's North Beach opposite Anchorsholme Lane at around 22:50 (grid ref SD 309,424 53°52′23″N 3°03′09″W), very close to the remains of the Abana. The passengers and crew lifted off the ship arrived at Blackpool Airport at 22:00, and two of them were taken to hospital suffering from mild hypothermia, but were not admitted. The passenger who had called his wife was able to call her at 22:30 to say that he was safe. Six crew members were taken off the vessel after it had run aground.

The decision to evacuate the remaining nine crew members was made in the early hours of 1 February. The remaining crew were airlifted off the ship at 04:00 on 1 February. The rescued crew and passengers were accommodated at a hotel in Lancaster or provided with a taxi home.

== The rescue ==
Rescue crews involved in the incident described the weather as "some of the worst we've ever seen". The crew of the helicopter from RAF Valley said the wind was gusting between 30 and 70 knots (56 and 130 km/h; 35 and 81 mph). The safest position on board the ship was also the position which was most difficult for the helicopter crew to reach.

Lifeboats from Lytham and Fleetwood attended and were ready to recover any casualties from the sea. They also illuminated the ship with their searchlights.

=== Aftermath ===
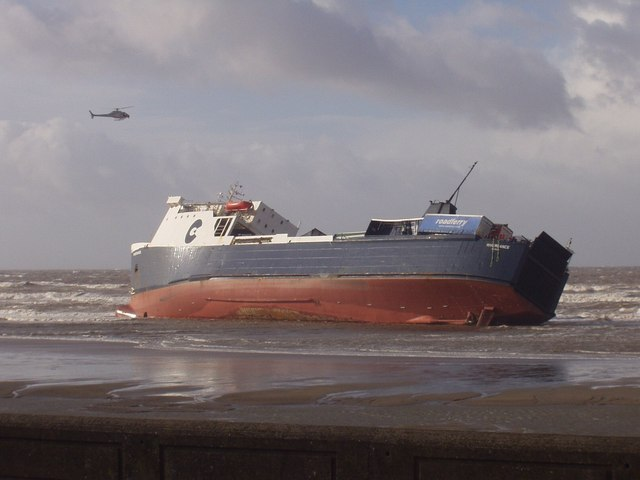
Riverdance beached at Blackpool

Like the Athina B at Brighton in 1980, Riverdance was a temporary tourist attraction, with local traders reporting that they were as busy as they would normally be during the Blackpool Illuminations. The boom lasted for over ten weeks, with the refloating at one time being scheduled to take place in the week commencing 18 February, coinciding with the half-term holiday. Large crowds were expected to view the refloating. The ship was also expected to bring extra visitors to Blackpool over the Easter weekend. The Tourist Information Centre at Cleveleys reported a large increase in enquiries in the weeks after Riverdance grounded. Local residents complained that the influx of visitors "made their lives hell", raising parking, traffic and litter issues. By early April, the number of visitors had begun to drop.

The owner of an ice-cream parlour in Cleveleys prepared a display of photographs of the stricken ferry and used them to raise funds for the local Fleetwood branch of the RNLI, in appreciation of their work in rescuing the passengers and crew. Blackpool Council was reported to be studying the effect that the shipwreck had on tourism, and looking to learn lessons that could help boost tourism. It was estimated that over 100,000 people came to see the Riverdance.

=== Awards ===
The crew of the helicopter from RAF Valley involved in the rescue were given the 2008 Defence Helicopter SAR award for their part in the rescue: Flight Lieutenant Lee Turner, Flight Lieutenant Giles Ratcliffe, Sergeant John Stevens and MACR Rich Taylor. Flt Lt Lee Turner was also awarded the Air Force Cross by Her Majesty Queen Elizabeth II. Chief Coastguard Commendation for Meritorious Service was awarded to the 5 members of the watch at Liverpool Coastguard who were on duty for the grounding on the MV Riverdance, presented in 2013.

== Salvage ==
It had initially been hoped to recover the vessel and return her to service, but she was scrapped on site in 2008.

=== Preparation ===
The coastguard monitored the ship, which was carrying 150 tonnes of fuel oil. An attempt to refloat her was to have been made at high tide at 18:00 on 1 February, but it was later announced that no attempt would be made to refloat her that day. A salvage team from Smit International assessed the ship on 2 February, and a 400-metre (440 yd) exclusion zone was set up. Liverpool Coastguard warned that refloating the ship would take another two or three days, depending on weather and tide conditions, although another source stated the salvage operation could take weeks. It was estimated that refloating would take place in the second week of February, but this proved to be over optimistic. The salvage team assembled the equipment needed to refloat the ship, including a rigid inflatable boat suitable for use in shallow water. They planned to reduce the list of the ship and pump out the fuel on board. Riverdance was reported to be "intact".

It was reported that salvage teams had made "good progress" on 4 February. A crane travelled from York on 5 February and lifted equipment onto the ship. The salvage team aimed to reduce the list of the ship and make it more stable. On 4 February, around 50 members of the public ignored the exclusion zone to get close to the ship. Police and Coastguard admitted they were powerless to prevent the breach of the Government-imposed exclusion zone and vowed to step up security to prevent a recurrence. The imposition of the exclusion zone on grounds of public safety was proved to be correct when several trucks fell off on the afternoon of 5 February, caused by the ship moving at high tide. The exclusion zone was enforced on 6 February, with police, coastguard and security patrols being used. More of the ship's cargo fell overboard on 6 February. It was reported on 7 February that the salvage operation was going well, and about half of the equipment required for the operation was aboard. On 8 February, shackles holding the remaining trailers were released, allowing the vehicles on the top deck to fall overboard. The wreckage was cleared by a specialist demolition contractor.

The salvage team removed fuel from the ship by drilling a hole in the hull and pumping the fuel out. The process, known as "hot tapping", was expected to take up to a week. A boom was placed around the ship, and defuelling commenced. 18 tonnes of fuel was removed on 11 February and 29 tonnes on 12 February. Temporary repairs were made to the hull in preparation for refloating. Sightseers continued to breach the exclusion zone, including two jet skiers who approached the ship from the sea. The refloating of the ship was scheduled to take place in the week commencing 18 February. Large crowds were expected to witness the event, which would have coincided with the half-term holiday. It was later estimated that the ship would not be refloated for at least another two weeks. All fuel was removed from the tanks, and work was done to ensure the hull was watertight and to reduce the list. Over the weekend of 23–24 February, the ship settled further onto its side, listing at 85 degrees. Officials had to prevent people from trying to board the ship. It was revealed that the operation to refloat the vessel could take weeks, although speculation that she would be cut up on site was denied by Smit International, who said they needed only 8 m (26 ft) of water to refloat the ship. A 40 ft (12 m) diameter accommodation box fell from the ship between 24 and 27 February.

It was reported that Smit International still intended to refloat the ship. There was a two-week period ending 13 March in which to refloat the ship, with the refloating being most likely to take place towards the end of that period. Efforts to salvage the ship were hampered by the weather and the position the ship was in. The plan was to put the ship on an even keel on 13 or 14 March, seven weeks after the grounding. However, storms with winds of 78 knots (144 km/h; 90 mph) meant that plan was abandoned. Refloating was expected to take place about a week after the ship was righted.

=== Recovery attempts ===
A trench was dug in the sand alongside the ship, which had been made watertight. Four 20-tonne containers were placed on the port side, and water was to be pumped from the starboard to port tanks in an effort to right the ship. No date was set for the operation, due to the strong winds at the time. Once the ship was righted, it was expected to take several weeks to refloat her. Attempts to right her were abandoned on 12 March after storms battered her with 78-knot (144 km/h) winds, causing her to sink further into the sand and the list to increase to 100 degrees. The salvage plan was re-evaluated early in the week commencing 17 March. Meanwhile, work continued to reduce the threat of pollution from the vessel and clearing up any wreckage that was deposited from the vessel. A meeting between the salvors, insurers and owners of the ship took place on 20 March to discuss options for salvage. One option considered was to scrap her on site. On 21 March 2008, it was revealed that she had been declared a "constructive total loss" due to further damage inflicted by the storms earlier in the month. The preferred option was to refloat her and remove her by sea, but she would be cut up on site if the refloating operation failed. The plan was to use mechanical winches to haul her upright, rather than relying upon flotation devices.

On 10 April 2008, it was announced that attempts to refloat her had been abandoned and that she was to be scrapped in situ. The contract to dismantle her was awarded to Hancock's Contractors, of Heysham. The work was expected to take about 12 to 14 weeks. One of the reasons for that decision was that Riverdance had suffered further structural damage during the storms on 12 March 2008. The damage included damaged propellers and engine, loss of a rudder, the bulwarks destroyed on her starboard side, and a lifeboat destroyed.

=== Scrapping ===
The scrapping of Riverdance was carried out by Hancock's, with initial work to remove the remaining fuel, oil and cargo from the vessel. Hancock's took control of the site on 14 April 2008. Contractors inspected the Moondance, her sister ship, to get an idea of the general construction of the vessel. Dismantling plans included some night working, to the dismay of some local residents. Work commenced in the week beginning 29 April 2008, with an estimated completion date of "the end of June". By early May the work was underway, with the removal of handrails and the funnel to enable easier access to the interior. The initial phase of the demolition was expected to take four or five weeks. On 17 May 2008, a fire broke out on two lorries at about 4:20am, causing 30 workers to be evacuated from the vessel. The local fire brigade attended with five appliances and a mobile fire station, but withdrew shortly after due to the rising tide, leaving the fire to burn itself out. The scrapping resumed on 19 May 2008 with the wreck reduced to the level of the beach by 10 October 2008.

== Investigation ==
The Marine Accident Investigation Branch conducted an enquiry into the incident, and the final report was published on 3 September 2009.

== Culture and media ==
Riverdance featured in the video for the song Explosion by the German band Fotos.

'Riverdance' appears in the 2006 film 'Ghosts', directed by Nick Broomfield, based on the 2004 Morecambe Bay cockling disaster. Chinese immigrant Ai Qin is smuggled from Calais to Dover hidden inside a van aboard the ship.

The salvage operation was the subject of an episode of Salvage: Code Red, a National Geographic Channel documentary series.
