= Heysham Port =

Port in Lancashire, England

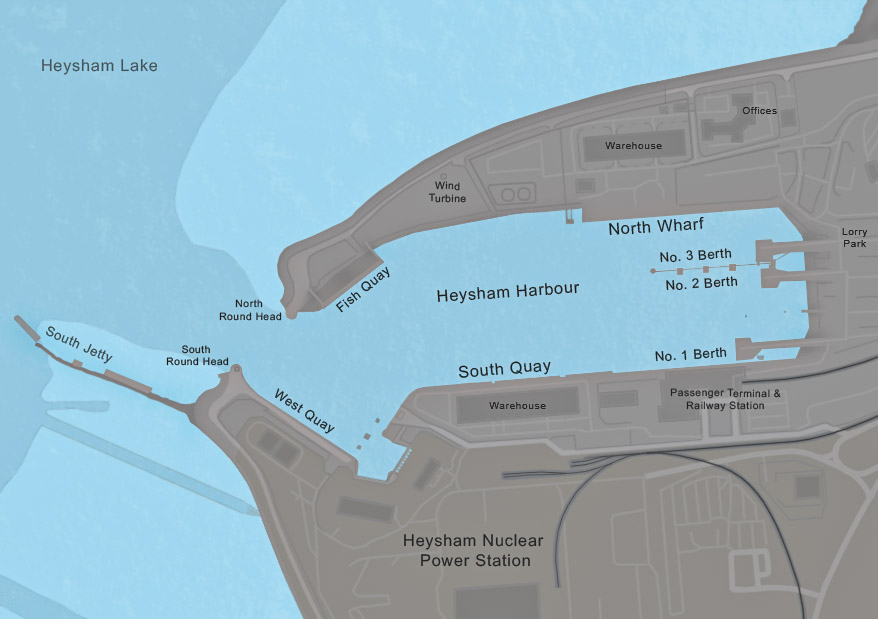
- Interactive map of Heysham Port

Location
- Location: Heysham
- Coordinates: 54°2′11.93″N 2°54′49.61″W

Details
- Built: 1897
- Opened: 1904
- Operated by: Mersey Docks and Harbour Company
- Owned by: The Peel Group
- Type of harbour: Artificial
- No. of berths: 3 (Ro-Ro)
- Overall Quay Length: 1,000 m (3,300 ft)

Statistics
- Passenger traffic: 143,417 (2021)

Heysham Port is situated by the village of Heysham, Lancashire, England. The harbour ships mainly roll-on/roll-off freight, with one passenger service run by the Isle of Man Steam Packet Company, which operates a twice daily sailing to Isle of Man. There are three freight routes run by CLdN RoRo and Stena Line which all sail to Ireland daily. Heysham Port railway station links it to Lancaster via Morecambe. Adjacent to the dock site is Heysham nuclear power station.

== History ==
In 1891, the Midland Railway, which already operated Morecambe Harbour four miles to the north-east, gave notice of its intention to develop a new harbour at Heysham and appointed consulting engineers James Abernethy and his son to undertake a feasibility study of the project. The plan was for an enclosed dock accessed through a lock, but idea made no further progress.

In 1895, a much larger Heysham port plan was put forward by Messrs James Abernethy & Son, in conjunction with the Midland Railway's chief engineer. This formed the basis of the harbour which was built, although there were many changes as work progressed and the full scheme was never completed. In 1896, an enabling act of Parliament, the Midland Railway Act 1896 (59 & 60 Vict. c. clxxxiii), was obtained for the construction of the harbour, with the contract for construction was let in July 1897. The project cost about £3 million.

The first ship to dock at Heysham was the Antrim, one of the ships that the Midland Railway had ordered for Heysham services. She arrived at the Heysham on 31 May 1904, following her delivery from the builders, John Brown of Clydebank.. The first passenger sailing was a day trip to Douglas, Isle of Man by the Londonderry on the 13 August 1904.

The south jetty was built in 1909 to reduce silt buildup at the harbour entrance. Plans from 1907 show that two jetties were originally planned, one on each side of the entrance, but a north jetty was never actually built.

In 1941 a deep-water berth (Ocean Jetty) was built to the north-east of harbour entrance. This was to allow tankers which were too large for the port to berth at the new Trimpell refinery, which produced aviation fuel. Much of the fuel produced would have been for fighter aircraft stationed around Britain during World War II. After the Tranmere pipeline construction, the Ocean Jetty berth was rarely used until its demolition in 1976.

With the grouping of the railways in 1923, Heysham Port passed into the London, Midland and Scottish Railway. When the railways were nationalised in 1948, the port came under the British Transport Commission, then the British Railways Board, and its shipping arm Sealink. Sealink was sold by the government in 1984 to Sea Containers.

Heysham Port was acquired from Sea Containers by the Mersey Docks and Harbour Company (MDHC) in May 2001. Then, in August 2005 the MDHC was bought by and merged with Peel Ports Limited.

== Ships in operation ==
Vessels that currently operate out of Heysham Port.

Image	Name	Built (commissioned)	Route(s)	Capacity	Port of Registry	Company
	MS; Ben-my-Chree	April 1998 (July 1998)	Heysham – Douglas (Back-up vessel)	630 Passenger; 275 Cars	(Isle of Man); Douglas	Isle of Man Steam Packet Company
	MV; Manxman	June 2022	Heysham – Douglas	948 Passengers; 237 Vehicles; 75 Trailers	(Isle of Man); Douglas	Isle of Man Steam Packet Company
	HSC; Manannan	November 1998 (May 2009)	Heysham – Douglas (Summer TT and cover for Dry docking only)	800+ passengers 200 vehicles	(Isle of Man); Douglas	Isle of Man Steam Packet Company
	MS Arrow	August 1998	Heysham- Douglas (Summer TT and Cover Dry docking Only)	12 Passengers; 65 Trailers	(Isle of Man); Douglas	Isle of Man Steam Packet Company
	MS Stena Futura	2025	Heysham-Belfast			Stena Line
	MS Stena Scotia	1996	Heysham – Belfast	114 trailers	Vlaardingen	Stena Line
The_"Stena_Hibernia",_Belfast_(December_2016)_-_geograph.org.uk_-_5212174	MS Stena Hibernia	1996	Heysham – Belfast	114 trailers	Vlaardingen	Stena Line
	MS Seatruck Power	February 2012 (February 2012)	Heysham – Dublin	151 trailers	(Isle of Man); Douglas	CLdN RoRo
	MS Seatruck Point	March 2012 (March 2012)	Heysham – Warrenpoint	120 trailers	(Cyprus); Limassol	CLdN RoRo
	MS; Seatruck Performance	January 2012 (April 2012)	Heysham – Warrenpoint	151 trailers	(Isle of Man); Douglas	CLdN RoRo

== Current routes ==
The routes which Heysham port offers:

- Heysham – Dublin (Seatruck Ferries)
- Heysham – Warrenpoint (Seatruck Ferries)
- Heysham – Douglas (Isle of Man Steam Packet Co)
- Heysham – Belfast (Stena Line)

== Image gallery ==
North Quay

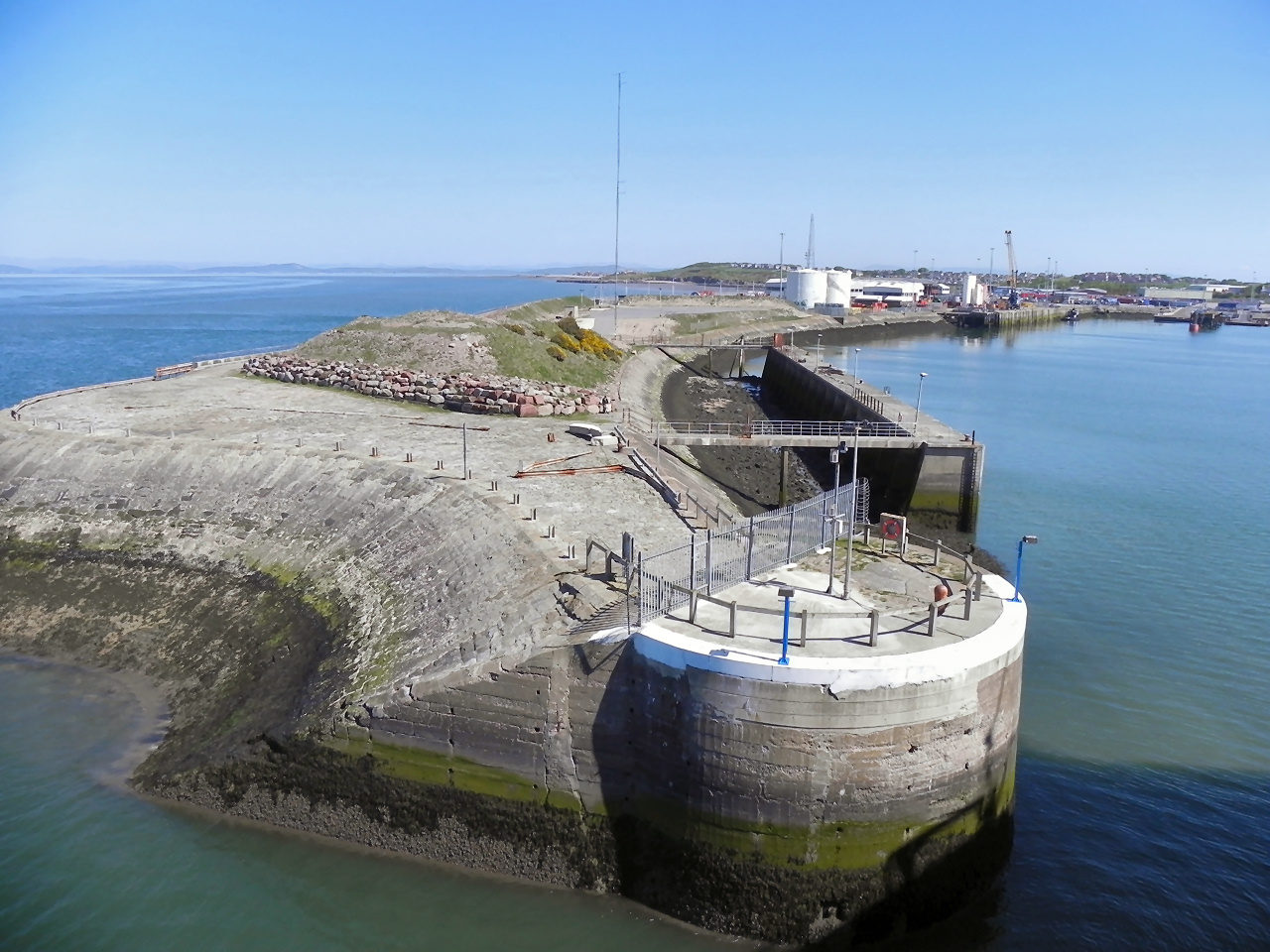

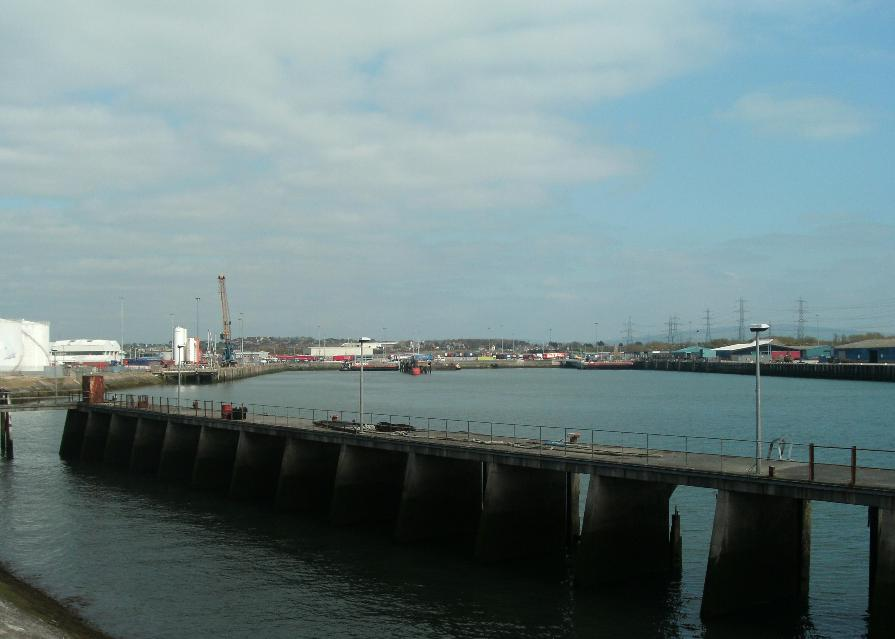

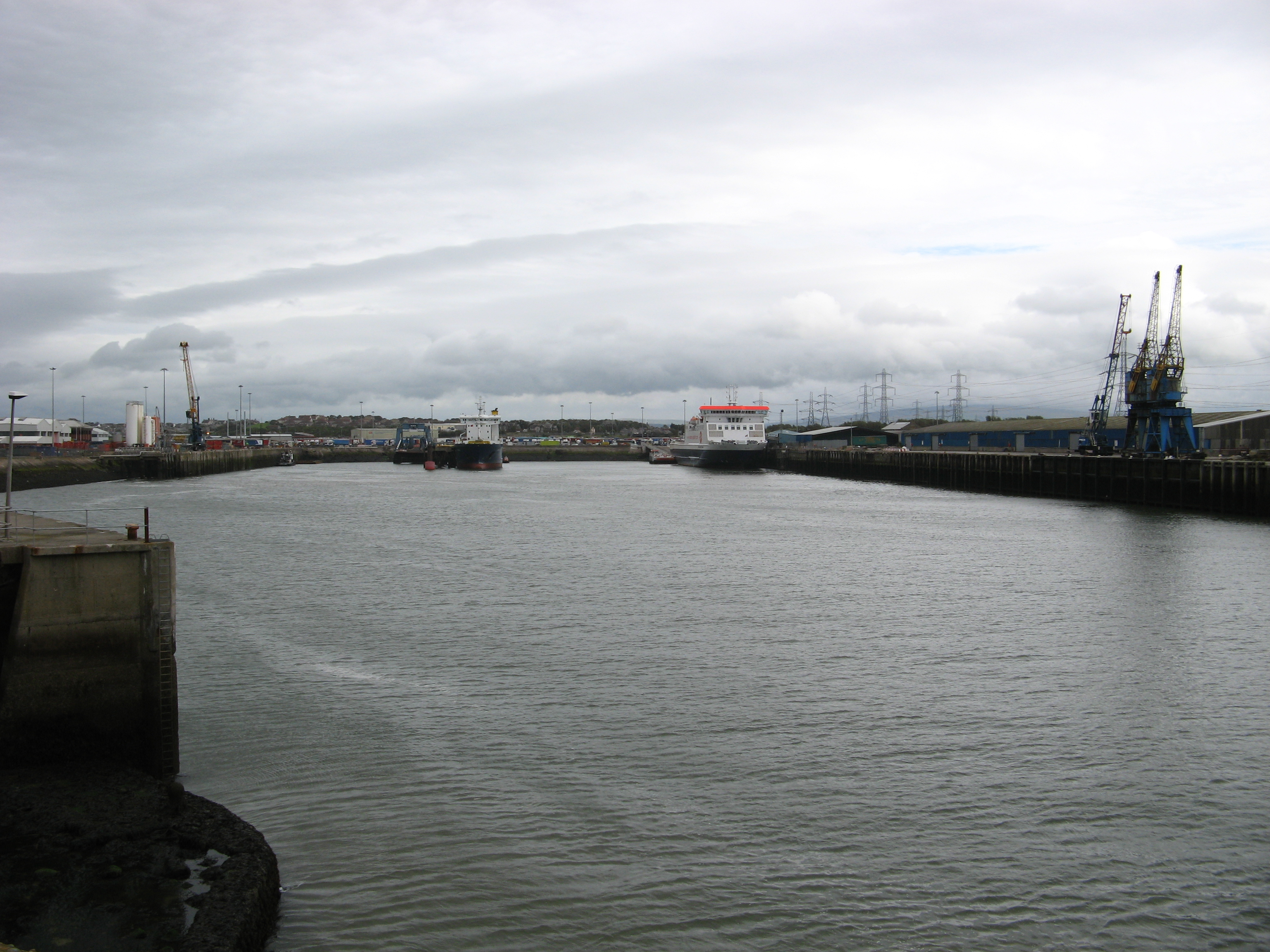

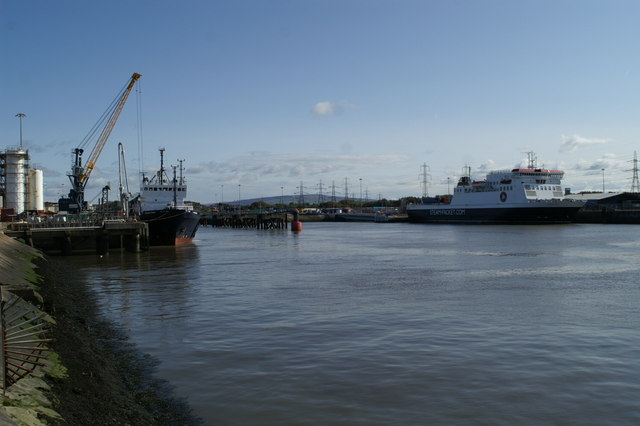

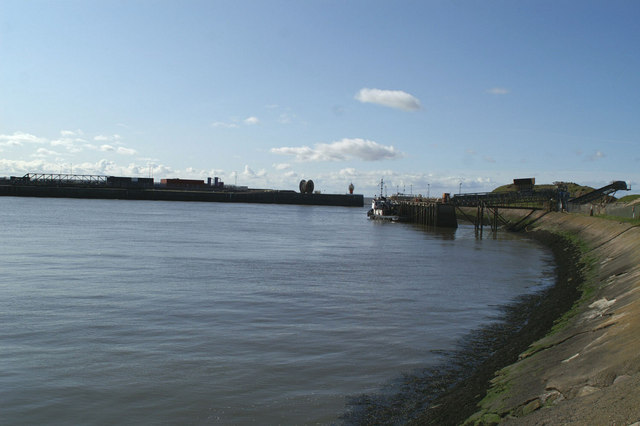
South Quay

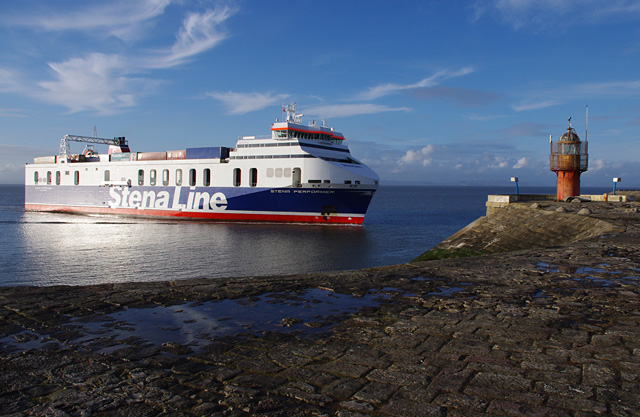

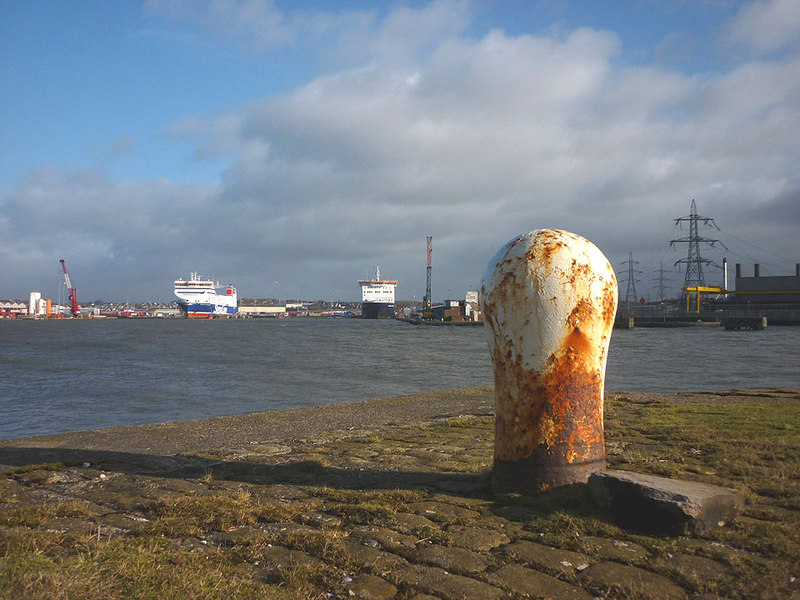

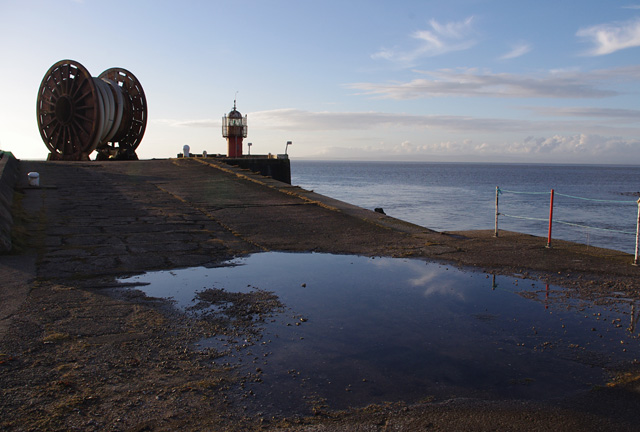

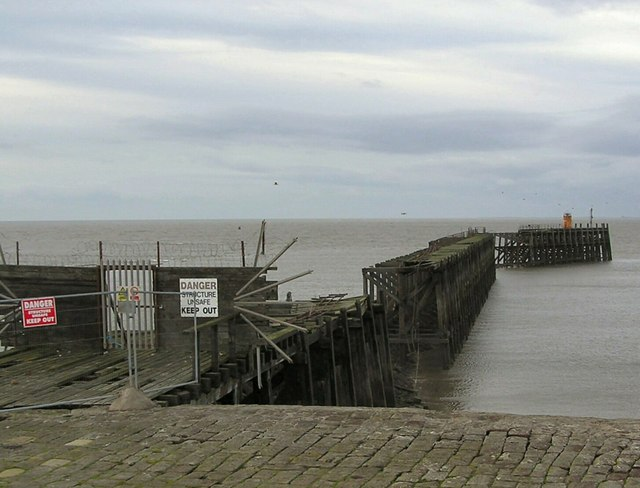

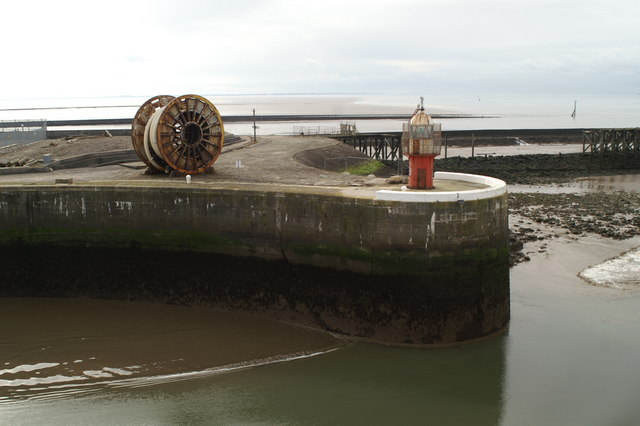
Other Views

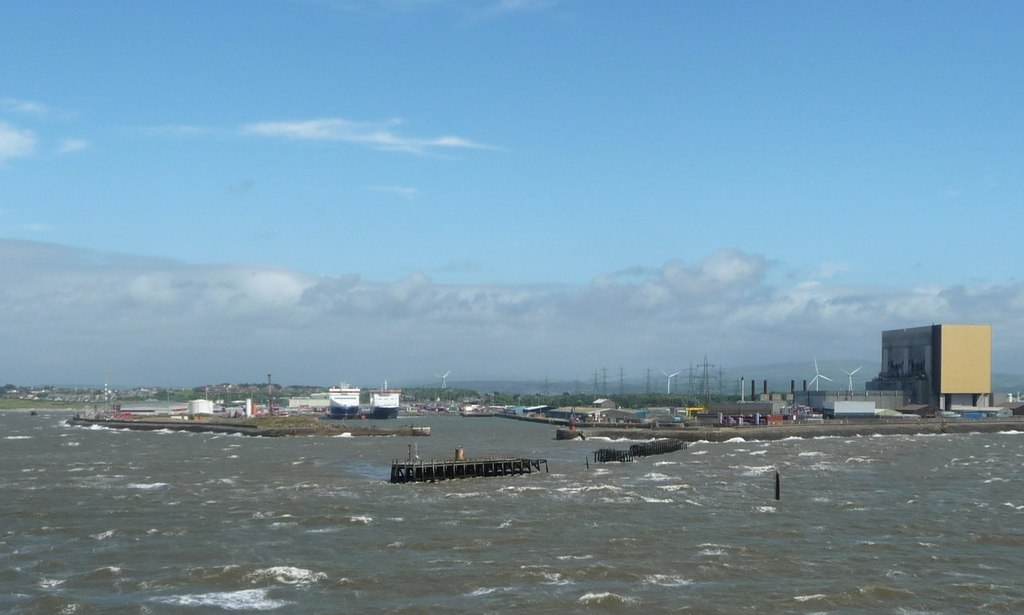

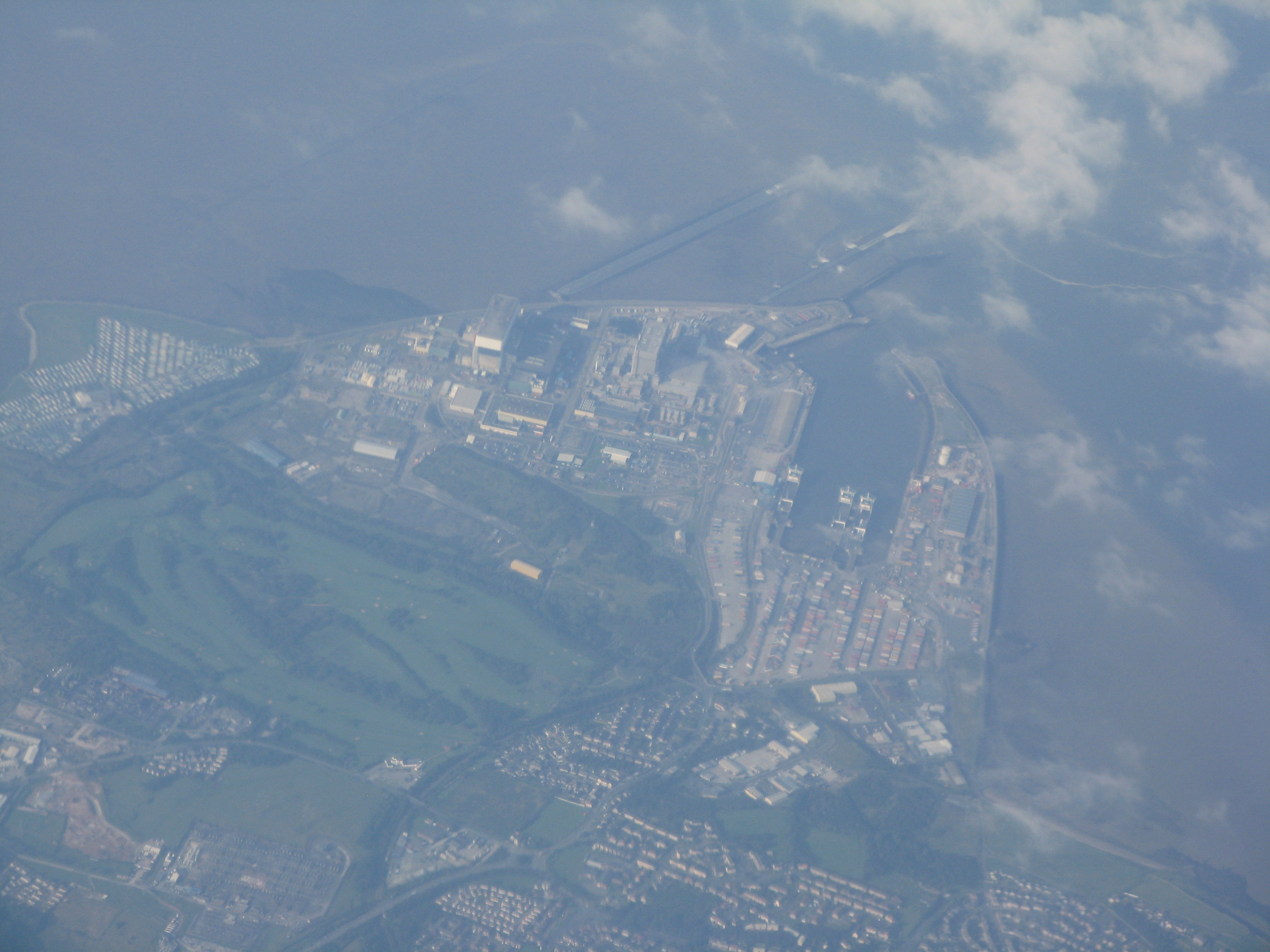

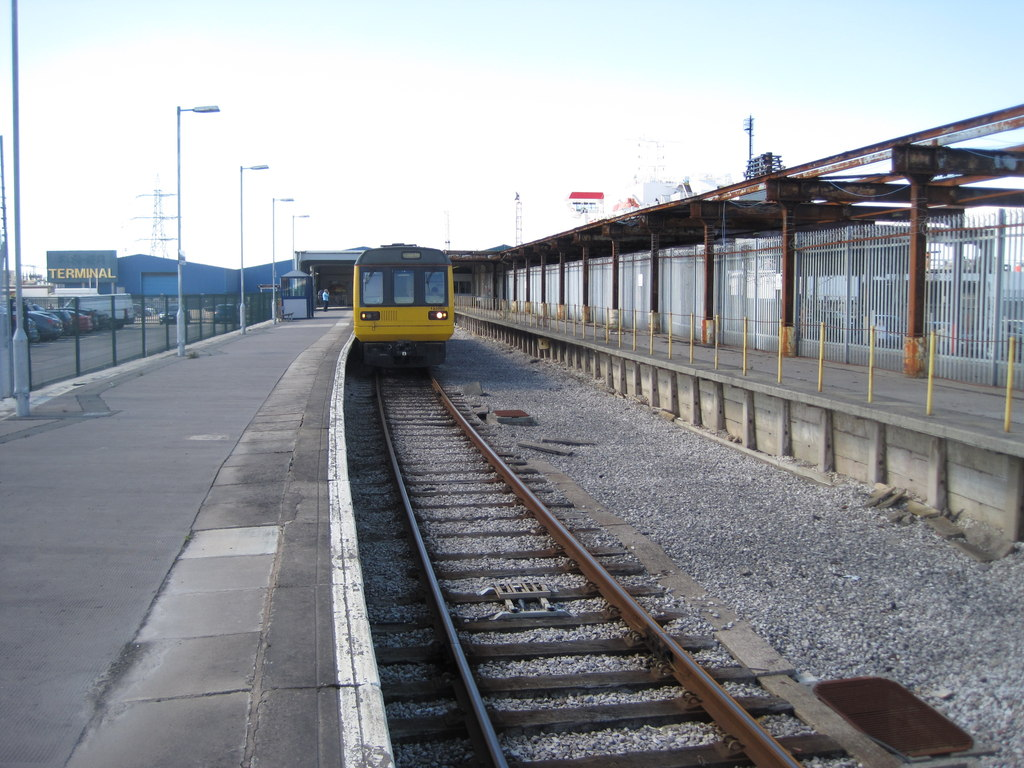

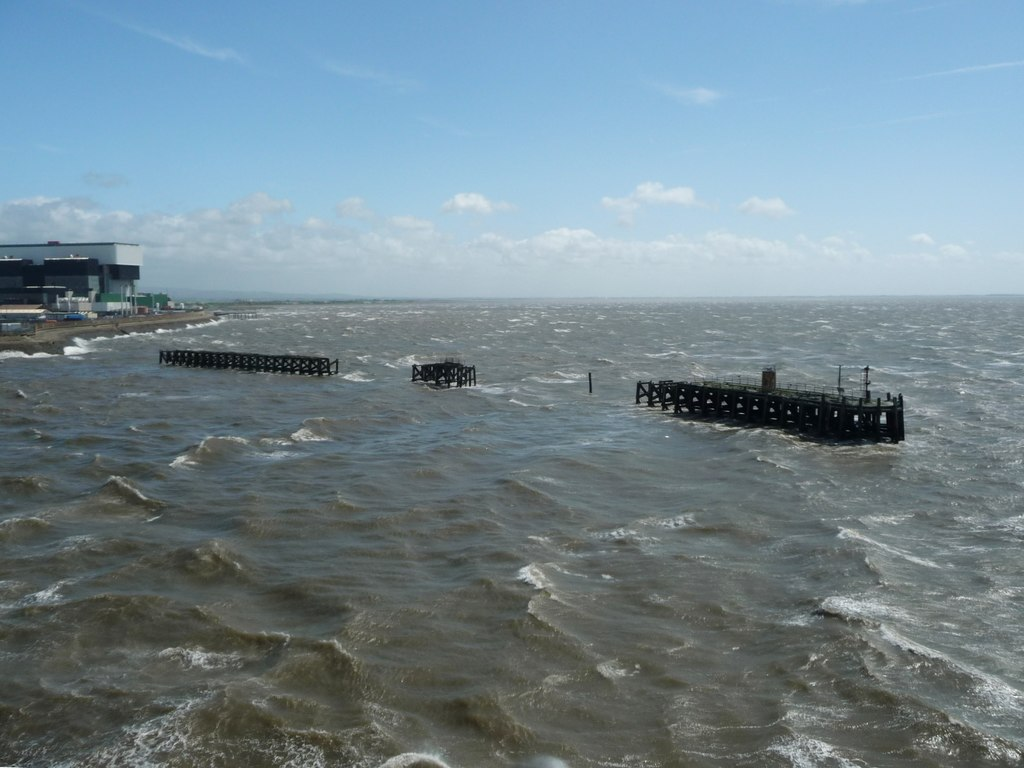

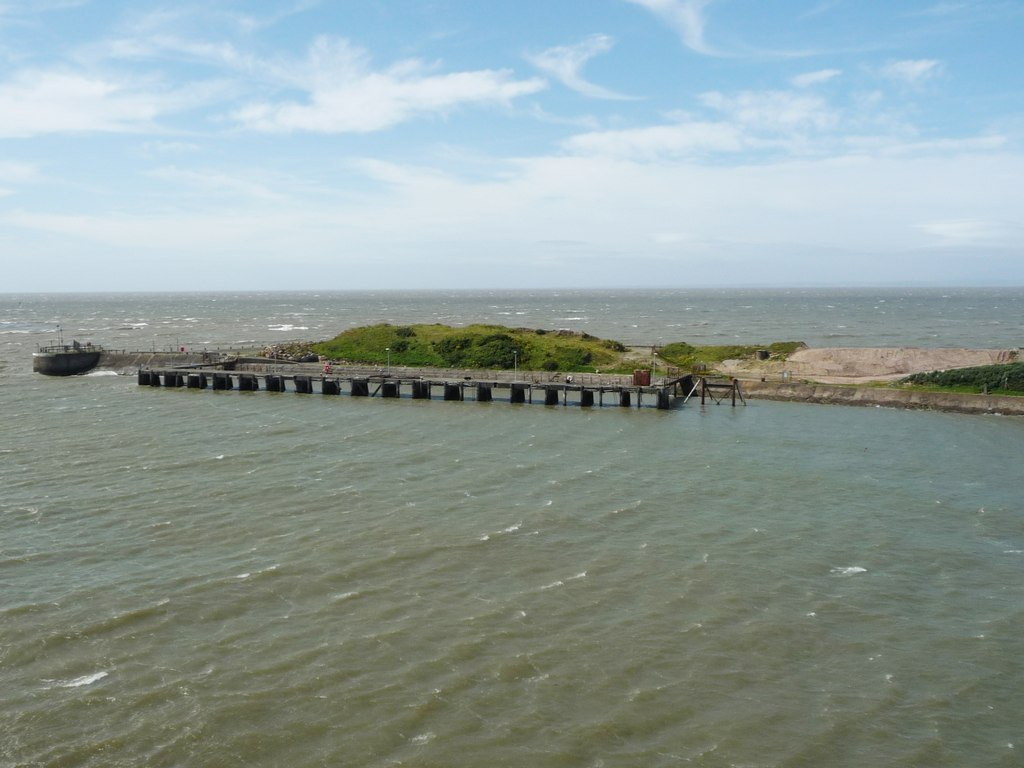
