= List of shipwrecks in 1894 =

The list of shipwrecks in 1894 includes ships sunk, foundered, grounded, or otherwise lost during 1894.

table of contents
1894
Jan	Feb	Mar	Apr
May	Jun	Jul	Aug
Sep	Oct	Nov	Dec
Unknown date

According to the American newspapers of 1894, the winter and spring storms of December 1893 to April 1894 proved to be one of the most disastrous for the United States, particularly the Cape Cod area, since 1860. The eastern seaboard of the continent had already faced a fierce hurricane season in 1893 when over 2,000 people died.

== January ==
=== 4 January ===
List of shipwrecks: 4 January
Ship	State	Description
A. L. Mason	United States	During a voyage from St. Louis, Missouri, to New Orleans, Louisiana, the steamboat struck a hidden obstruction and sank in the Mississippi River off Delta, Mississippi. She was declared a total loss.
Diamond		The schooner was lost off Cossack Creek, Western Australia.

=== 12 January ===
List of shipwrecks: 12 January
Ship	State	Description
Henrietta	United States	The fishing schooner sank in a heavy gale on the Georges Bank. Lost with all 14 crew.
Minnie M.	United States	The steamer stranded at the mouth of the Nooksack River in a gale, a total loss.
Robert J. Edwards	United States	The fishing schooner was wrecked on Sable Island in a gale. Lost with all 10 crew.

=== 14 January ===
List of shipwrecks: 14 January
Ship	State	Description
Cascade	United States	The steamer sprung a leak in a storm and was beached to prevent sinking.
Myra	United States	The launch broke loose from her moorings during a flood in the Skokomish River. She filled and sank.

=== 16 January ===
List of shipwrecks: 16 January
Ship	State	Description
Little Fred	United States	The steamer struck an obstruction and sank at 8 Mile in the Cincinnati, Ohio, area. Raised the same day.

=== 17 January ===
List of shipwrecks: 17 January
Ship	State	Description
Else	Denmark	The barque capsized and sank in the Atlantic Ocean 600 nautical miles (1,100 km) south west of The Lizard, Cornwall, United Kingdom. Her crew were rescued by Castle Rock (United Kingdom). Else was on a voyage from Guayaquil, Ecuador to Hamburg, Germany.
Howard	United States	The steamer caught fire at the Wallabout Dock in Brooklyn and was scuttled to extinguish the fire.

=== 18 January ===
List of shipwrecks: 18 January 1894
Ship	State	Description
Mary Wood	United States	The schooner was wrecked near Kodiak, District of Alaska.
Susan L. Hodge	United States	The schooner was dismasted on 13 January in the gale of 12/13 January. On 18 January a can of kerosene caught fire and the vessel was burning rapidly, but it caught the attention of LeBretagne (France) who rescued them just in time, as all of her boats had washed overboard in the gale.

=== 20 January ===
List of shipwrecks: 20 January
Ship	State	Description
City of Stamwood	United States	The steamer caught fire at Howards Point and was beached and she burned out a total loss.
Midget	United States	The steamer, laid up for the Winter, was sunk by ice in six feet (1.8 m) of water at dock at Sabula, Iowa. Raised and repaired.

=== 22 January ===
List of shipwrecks: 22 January
Ship	State	Description
Louis Osborn	United States	The tug sank over night at dock in East Boston, Massachusetts. Later raised.

=== 23 January ===
List of shipwrecks: 23 January
Ship	State	Description
Harlan	United States	The steamer was destroyed by fire while at anchor at Bluefields, Nicaragua.

=== 24 January ===
List of shipwrecks: 24 January
Ship	State	Description
Little Clyde	United States	The passenger steamer burned to the waterline and sank in 20 feet (6.1 m) of water while lying over night at Spottsville, Kentucky.
Montana	United States	The tug was wrecked on Bakers Island in Massachusetts Bay in thick weather and heavy seas, a total loss.

=== 28 January ===
List of shipwrecks: 28 January
Ship	State	Description
Camusi	United States	The steamer was destroyed by fire at dock in Palatka, Florida, a total loss.
Wm. Towle	United States	The steamer sank in the Tennessee River at Decatur, Alabama due to a burst pipe. Later raised.

=== 29 January ===
List of shipwrecks: 29 January
Ship	State	Description
Aberdeen	United States	The schooner was wrecked in a snowstorm at Pebbly Beach Cove. The crew survived.
Gertie E. Foster	United States	The schooner was at Strawberry Point near Liverpool, Nova Scotia. 5 crew drowned, her Captain and 6 crewmen survived.

=== Unknown date ===
List of shipwrecks: Unknown date 1894
Ship	State	Description
Afon Cefni	United Kingdom	The four-masted barque was last seen off Lundy, UK on 5 January while on voyage from Swansea to San Francisco. From 20 January to 5 February, wreckage from the ship washed up on the Cornish and Sussex coasts.
Firth of Cromarty	United Kingdom	The full-rigged ship grounded in St Margaret's Bay with the loss of two lives.
Flash	United States	The fishing schooner sailed for Newfoundland on 12 January and vanished, there was a heavy gale later that day. All six crew were killed.

== February ==
=== 1 February ===
List of shipwrecks: 1 February 1894
Ship	State	Description
Bessie Siler	United States	The steamer struck a snag and sank at New Iberia, Louisiana. Later raised.

=== 2 February ===
List of shipwrecks: 2 February 1894
Ship	State	Description
USS Kearsarge	United States Navy	The Mohican-class sloop-of-war ran aground at Roncador Cay, Colombia, and was wrecked.

=== 6 February ===
List of shipwrecks: 6 February 1894
Ship	State	Description
Brunhilde	United States	The schooner was dismasted on 30 January. The crew was taken off on 6 February by schooner Laura and she was scuttled by burning.
Eureka	United States	The ferry sprung a leak and sank while lying over night at Golconda, Illinois. Raised and repaired.

=== 11 February ===
List of shipwrecks: 11 February 1894
Ship	State	Description
Henry Bailey	United States	The steamer grounded at the mouth of the Skagit River and was submerged by the rising tide.
Talifoo	United Kingdom	The steam trawler was wrecked in the Inner Hebrides, Scotland.

=== 12 February ===
List of shipwrecks: 12 February 1894
Ship	State	Description
Alert	United States	The schooner was on the Ramea Islands, Newfoundland. After the crew was rescued she floated off, probably sank in a gale later.
Fortuna	United States	The schooner was wrecked one-quarter mile (0.40 km) off Race Point in the gale. Two crew drowned.
Huntcliff	United Kingdom	The tramp steamer was beached at Blackpool, Lancashire. All crew safe. She was refloated on 23 February.
Maurice & Marguerite	Belgium	The schooner foundered on a voyage between Antwerp and Buenos Aires, Argentina.

=== 14 February ===
List of shipwrecks: 14 February 1894
Ship	State	Description
Col. J. H. French	United States	The schooner sprung a leak in the gale of 12 February. The crew were rescued on 14 February by Gertie E. Foster (United States).
Maggie E. Wells	United States	The schooner was heavily damaged by huge waves in a severe gale while at anchor on the Quero Banks on 12 February. She drifted off in the storm. On 13 February the tanker Amsterdam (Netherlands) attempted to rescue her crew but lost a lifeboat and six crew and gave up the attempt. On 14 February Maggie E. Wells' crew was taken off by the schooner Magnolia (United States) and she was scuttled by burning about 40 miles (64 km) south east of Sable Island, Nova Scotia.
Porter S. Roberts	United States	The waterlogged and dismasted schooner was scuttled by burning about 40 miles (64 km) south of Sable Island, Nova Scotia by Pavonia.

=== 15 February ===
List of shipwrecks: 15 February 1894
Ship	State	Description
Roberts Island	United States	The steamer burned to the waterline at China Ferry in the Sacramento River.

=== 16 February ===
List of shipwrecks: 16 February 1894
Ship	State	Description
Edward P. Boynton	United States	The schooner was wrecked at St. Mary's Bay, Newfoundland.
Ida	United States	The steamer burned and sank at dock at the People's Wharf, Baltimore, Maryland.

=== 17 February ===
List of shipwrecks: 17 February 1894
Ship	State	Description
Ohio	United States	The steamer struck a stump and sank at Cottonwood Point, Missouri, 120 miles (190 km) above Memphis, Tennessee, a total loss.
Truro	United States	The tug got hung up under her dock at South Street on the Delaware side opposite Philadelphia on a rising tide, filled and sank. Raised the next day.

=== 19 February ===
List of shipwrecks: 19 February 1894
Ship	State	Description
Mattie Lee	United States	The passenger steamer was sunk by ice at Miama, Missouri in the Missouri River, a total loss.

=== 23 February ===
List of shipwrecks: 23 February 1894
Ship	State	Description
Emma Uhl	United States	The steamer sprang a leak and sank overnight at Sistersville, West Virginia. Broken up.

=== 24 February ===
List of shipwrecks: 24 February 1894
Ship	State	Description
Aarhus	Germany	The barque sank off Cape Moreton, Australia.
Bella Israel	United States	The ferry was struck by a log and sank at dock at Donaldsonville, Louisiana. A total loss except for her machinery and boiler that were salvaged.

=== 26 February ===
List of shipwrecks: 26 February 1894
Ship	State	Description
Commodore Duryea	United States	The steamer caught fire and was beached to extinguish the fire.
Detmar	Germany	The schooner was stranded and wrecked near Terschelling, the Netherlands. The crew members were rescued by local fishermen.

=== 28 February ===
List of shipwrecks: 28 February 1894
Ship	State	Description
Maude	United States	The steamer struck an obstruction and sank in the Tennessee River at Guntersville, Alabama. Later raised.

== March ==
=== 2 March ===
List of shipwrecks: 2 March 1894
Ship	State	Description
Blanche	United States	The schooner was carried ashore by an ice flow at Port au Bras, Newfoundland, the ice took her back off the beach and then put her back on it. Wreck later sold.

=== 4 March ===
List of shipwrecks: 4 March 1894
Ship	State	Description
Mary E. Bennett	United States	The passenger steamer was sunk by ice at Sioux City, Iowa in the Missouri River. Raised and repaired.

=== 5 March ===
List of shipwrecks: 5 March 1894
Ship	State	Description
City of Snohomish	United States	The steamer grounded on Beans Point, a total loss.

=== 7 March ===
List of shipwrecks: 7 March 1894
Ship	State	Description
Undaunted	United States	The 68.18-gross register ton, 61-foot (19 m) sealing schooner was crushed by ice at Kayak Island on the coast of the District of Alaska at a position described in the wreck report as "60 08 12 N south end of Kayak Island Cove ESE." The entire crew of 15 escaped onto an ice floe and survived on it for 28 days before setting off in a small boat built from Undaunted's wreckage and making it to Port Etches in Prince William Sound, where the steamer Kodiak (United States) rescued them on 4 April.

=== 8 March ===
List of shipwrecks: 8 March 1894
Ship	State	Description
Claribell	United States	The steamer struck a log and sank at the Mouth of Eighteen Mile Creek in the Great Kanawha River. Raised and repaired.

=== 11 March ===
List of shipwrecks: 11 March 1894
Ship	State	Description
Addie	United States	The steamer struck a snag and sank near Austin Springs, Louisiana in Bayou D'Arbonne. A total loss.

=== 13 March ===
List of shipwrecks: 13 March 1894
Ship	State	Description
De Ruyter	Belgium	Passed Lizard Point bound for Boston, United States. No further trace.
Edith	United States	The steamer caught fire on Lake Erie near Mouse Island, Ohio. She ran aground and burned, a total loss.

=== 15 March ===
List of shipwrecks: 15 March 1894
Ship	State	Description
Mabel R. Woolford	United States	The schooner was run down and sunk by Lake Ontario. The crew were rescued by Lake Ontario.

=== 16 March ===
List of shipwrecks: 16 March 1894
Ship	State	Description
Alice N.	United States	The schooner sank 1,000 yards (910 m) east of Pensacola Bay, Florida beacon.

=== 17 March ===
List of shipwrecks: 17 March 1894
Ship	State	Description
Alice N.	United States	The schooner (different vessel than above) was wrecked on Santa Rosa Island, Florida.
Samson	United States	The steamer was sunk by an obstruction in six feet (1.8 m) of water in the Mississippi River near West Newton, Minnesota. Raised and repaired.

=== 21 March ===
List of shipwrecks: 21 March 1894
Ship	State	Description
Cabo Machichaco	Spain	Divers were working to salvage cargo from the wreck of the ship, which had exploded and sunk in the harbour of Santander, Spain in November 1893. 11 tonnes of dynamite in the flooded after hold of the wreck exploded, killing 18 people and injuring seven.

=== 22 March ===
List of shipwrecks: 22 March 1894
Ship	State	Description
Glenravil Miner	United Kingdom	The schooner was driven ashore and wrecked at Overton, Glamorgan. Her three crew were rescued.
Jacob Sinex	United States	The tug was caught under a dock on a rising tide while laid up for the night causing her to fill and sink.
Orient	United States	The steamer struck a snag in the Cowlitz River and sank.

=== Unknown date ===
List of shipwrecks: Unknown March 1894
Ship	State	Description
Alton S. Marshall	United States	The schooner was dismasted in a heavy gale on 26 March. The crew were taken off on 28 March by Mohawk.
Ambrose H. Knight	United States	The fishing schooner was left the port of Gloucester, Massachusetts for Iceland and vanished. Lost with all 16 crew.

== April ==
=== 1 April ===
List of shipwrecks: 1 April 1894
Ship	State	Description
Sunbeam	United States	The laid up steamer was destroyed by fire at dock in New Orleans. A total loss.

=== 3 April ===
List of shipwrecks: 3 April 1894
Ship	State	Description
William H. Barnum	United States	The steamer sank in ice and heavy weather in Lake Michigan in 70 feet (21 m) of water 5 1/2 miles (8.9 km) south south east of Mackinac a 1/2 mile (0.80 km) offshore (45°44′N 84°37′W). Her crew rescued by the tug Crusader (United States).

=== 4 April ===
List of shipwrecks: 4 April 1894
Ship	State	Description
Minneapolis	United States	The steamer sank in ice and heavy weather in Straits of Mackinac four miles (6.4 km) east of McGulpin Point (45°48′N 84°43′W) in 125 feet (38 m) of water.

=== 7 April ===
List of shipwrecks: 7 April 1894
Ship	State	Description
S. L. Merritt	United States	The schooner was sunk in a collision with the tug W. E. Gladwish (United States) near Elizabethport, New Jersey when the tug lost steerage in wind.

=== 8 April ===
List of shipwrecks: 8 April 1894
Ship	State	Description
Island City	United States	During a voyage from Ludington, Michigan, to Milwaukee, Wisconsin, with a cargo of hardwood, the two-masted schooner sank in Lake Michigan southeast of Port Washington, Wisconsin, during a storm. Her captain washed ashore in a yawl on 8 April and survived, but her other two crewmen perished. Her wreck lies in 135 feet (41 m) of water 9 miles (14 km) southeast of Port Washington at 43°14.39′N 087°50.73′W and was included in the Wisconsin Shipwreck Coast National Marine Sanctuary in 2021.

=== 11 April ===
List of shipwrecks: 11 April 1894
Ship	State	Description
Diamond	United States	The steamer burned at Avenue Landing, Tennessee, 140 miles (230 km) above Memphis, Tennessee, a total loss.
Majestic	United States	The steamer was heading into Cohansey Creek, New Jersey at 1 AM and ran aground. Refloated by a dredge on 14 April.
Startle	United States	The steamer was heading into Cohansey Creek, New Jersey at 1 AM and ran aground. Refloated by a dredge on 14 April.

=== 12 April ===
List of shipwrecks: 12 April 1894
Ship	State	Description
Jennie M Carter	United States	The three-masted schooner carrying paving stones bound for New York Bay. The ship was first damaged on 10 April 1894, ship owner and captain Wesley T Ober decided that he could pilot the crippled ship and dock safely, denying aid. However, they were overtaken by the storm of 12 April. The survivors attempted to abandon the schooner in a lifeboat but did not reach land. The ship, meanwhile, had been driven by the storm onto Salisbury Beach, Massachusetts. By 15 April, the crew was declared deceased after thorough searching. It is thought that the crew may have survived had they kept to the interior of the ship with the cargo. Three bodies and an overcoat belonging to the first mate were recovered; the lifeboat was recovered near Plum Island. Folklore dictates that the ship's cat was the only survivor. The story of the shipwrecks from 12 April and the previous weeks sparked national interest and thousands gathered to see the wreck of Jennie M Carter. The paving stones were removed and sold at auction; some were used in Salisbury. The ship remains were considered unsalvageable and left to disintegrate on the beach where it became a well-known site. Some of the wooden frame could still be seen in 2013.
S A Rudolph	United States	The three-masted schooner, loaded with ice blocks bound for Ocean City, Maryland from Boothbay, Maine, was caught in a sudden gale on the night of 12 April and foundered on the shoals of Cape Cod. The fractured hull of the ship washed up north of Nauset Beach. All six crew members perished.

=== 14 April ===
List of shipwrecks: 14 April 1894
Ship	State	Description
Unger	United States	The sealing schooner was lost with all hands during a storm in the Sea of Japan.

=== 16 April ===
List of shipwrecks: 16 April 1894
Ship	State	Description
Burlington	United States	The steamer burned and sank in the Detroit River below Sandwich Point.

=== 21 April ===
List of shipwrecks: 21 April 1894
Ship	State	Description
Isolene	United States	The yacht burned and sank after being struck by lightning at Northport, New York.

=== 22 April ===
List of shipwrecks: 22 April 1894
Ship	State	Description
Los Angeles	United States	With 70 passengers and crew aboard, the steamer was struck a rock or reef in the Pacific Ocean off Point Sur on the coast of California, she drifted off and sank in 54 feet (16 m) of water. with the loss of about six lives. Some of her survivors reached shore, while others were rescued at sea by the steamer Eureka (flag unknown).

=== 24 April ===
List of shipwrecks: 24 April 1894
Ship	State	Description
Frances Biedler	United States	The steamer was destroyed by fire at Punta Gorda, Florida.

=== 27 April ===
List of shipwrecks: 27 April 1894
Ship	State	Description
I. T. Rhea	United States	The steamer struck an obstruction and sank in 5 1/2 feet (1.7 m) of water at Butler's Landing in the Cumberland River. Later raised.

=== Unknown date ===
List of shipwrecks: Unknown April 1894
Ship	State	Description
Belmont	United States	The barkentine was wrecked sometime in April in an unknown location.
Martha and Susan	United States	The fishing schooner probably sank in a gale on the Georges Bank after communicating with another vessel earlier in the storm. Lost with all 13 hands.
Mascot	United States	The sealing schooner was lost with all hands during a storm in the Sea of Japan.
Matthew Turner	United States	The sealing schooner was lost with all hands during a storm in the Sea of Japan.

== May ==
=== 1 May ===
List of shipwrecks: 1 May 1894
Ship	State	Description
Iron Duke	United States	The tow steamer was sunk in a collision with a barge towed by Alice Brown (United States) in the Mississippi River 15 miles (24 km) above Cairo, Illinois, a total loss of both steamer and barge.

=== 3 May ===
List of shipwrecks: 3 May 1894
Ship	State	Description
Helen	United States	The 27.82-ton, 45.6-foot (13.9 m) schooner lost her rudder, sprang a leak, and ran aground on the south-central coast of the District of Alaska near Yakutat Bay and Mount Saint Elias. Her crew of 14 survived. She later was salvaged.

=== 5 May ===
List of shipwrecks: 5 May 1894
Ship	State	Description
Garland	United States	The steamer struck a snag and sank at Beulah, Louisiana in the Red River. A total loss.
General Lincoln	United States	The steamer struck a rock off Thompson Island and was beached to prevent sinking.

=== 6 May ===
List of shipwrecks: 6 May 1894
Ship	State	Description
American Union	United States	American Union in 2019 The wooden schooner ran aground near Presque Isle, Michigan, during a storm on Lake Huron. She sank in 10 feet (3 m) of water at 45.356867°N 83.589467°W.

=== 7 May ===
List of shipwrecks: 7 May 1894
Ship	State	Description
May Libbie	United States	The steamer was holed by a raft of timber she was towing alongside wearing a hole through her side. She was beached on Beaver Island and settled in nine feet (2.7 m) of water in the Mississippi River near Clinton, Iowa. Raised and repaired.

=== 10 May ===
List of shipwrecks: 10 May 1894
Ship	State	Description
Eugene	United States	The tow steamer capsized and sank in 20 feet (6.1 m) of water in a heavy wind storm near Mount Vernon, Indiana.

=== 11 May ===
List of shipwrecks: 11 May 1894
Ship	State	Description
Henry Logan	United States	The steamer struck an obstruction and sank six miles (9.7 km) above the mouth of the Salt River. She was raised and beached on the Indiana side of the Ohio River opposite the mouth of the Salt River, but was a total loss.
James Allen	United States	The 330-ton, 116.7-foot (35.6 m) whaling bark was wrecked on a rock in Seguam Pass on the east end of Amlia in the Aleutian Islands. One man stayed aboard James Allen and was lost. The rest of the crew abandoned ship in four lifeboats. One lifeboat carrying 15 crew members disappeared with the loss of all on board. Another, with eight men aboard, reached Atka Island, where the steamer Dora (United States) picked up its occupants a week later. The other two lifeboats capsized with the loss of 10 men, but their survivors reached Umnak Island, where six more men died over the next two weeks. James Allen's captain and five crewman then made a one-week voyage to Unalaska on Unalaska Island in a small boat, after which the captain returned to Unmnak Island aboard the revenue cutter USRC Bear ( United States Revenue-Marine) two days later to rescue the nine survivors left behind there.

=== 13 May ===
List of shipwrecks: 13 May 1894
Ship	State	Description
Theodorus	Russia	The barque went aground on the Colorados Reefs, Cuba during a voyage from Pensacola, Florida for Lübeck, Germany with timber, and was abandoned. She was refloated by salvors and taken to Havana where condemned. (She was previously wrecked as the steamship Tiber in May 1871, but subsequently rebuilt.)

=== 20 May ===
List of shipwrecks: 20 May 1894
Ship	State	Description
New York	United States	The steamer burned to the waterline at Mill's shipyard, Camden, New Jersey while laid up at night.
Pacific	United States	The steamer sank at dock in the Portage Lake Ship Canal when she was struck by Henry B. Richards (United States). Raised and repaired.

=== 22 May ===
List of shipwrecks: 22 May 1894
Ship	State	Description
Queen of the Bay	United Kingdom	The excursion steamer was destroyed by fire while laid up in the River Usk at Newport, Monmouthshire, Wales. She was later sold for scrapping.

=== 25 May ===
List of shipwrecks: 25 May 1894
Ship	State	Description
Isere	United States	The steamer sheared out of line and struck the rocky shore of the Kentucky River just below McCowan's Ferry and sank, a total loss.

=== 31 May ===
List of shipwrecks: 31 May 1894
Ship	State	Description
Henry Bailey	United States	The steamer was snagged and sunk in Freshwater Slough in the Skagit River.

== June ==
=== 1 June ===
List of shipwrecks: 1 June 1894
Ship	State	Description
A. F. Kappalla	United States	The tug was run down and sunk by the schooner she was towing, Three Sisters (United States), in the East River off New York City, sinking in 60 feet (18 m) of water.

=== 2 June ===
List of shipwrecks: 2 June 1894
Ship	State	Description
A. J. Hoole	United States	The tug was run down and sunk by the steamer Manor (a foreign vessel, flag unidentified) in the North River off New York City. Her engineer drowned.
J. H. Woodson	United States	The steamer struck a rock and sank at Perrins Landing, Arkansas in the White River. Raised and repaired.
Latrona	United States	The pleasure steamer struck an obstruction and capsized in the Wabash River. One female passenger died.

=== 3 June ===
List of shipwrecks: 3 June 1894
Ship	State	Description
Harvest Queen	United States	The steamer struck a rock and sank at the Cascade Falls in the Columbia River. Later raised.
Maria	United States	The steamer came in contact with a submerged piling and sank at dock at Portland, Oregon.

=== 6 June ===
List of shipwrecks: 6 June 1894
Ship	State	Description
Bessie Siler	United States	The steamer sprung a leak and sank at New Iberia, Louisiana in Bayou Teche. Later raised.
Rambler	United States	The steamer was sunk when her boiler exploded at dock in New Haven, Connecticut, later raised. One crewman killed.

=== 11 June ===
List of shipwrecks: 11 June 1894
Ship	State	Description
87S	Regia Marina	The torpedo boat sank in La Spezia Bay off La Spezia, Italy, after colliding with the training ship Terribile (Regia Marina). She was refloated the next day.

=== 13 June ===
List of shipwrecks: 13 June 1894
Ship	State	Description
Verona	United States	The steamer struck an obstruction and sank two miles (3.2 km) below Obion, Tennessee in the Obion River. Raised and repaired.

=== 16 June ===
List of shipwrecks: 16 June 1894
Ship	State	Description
Nina	United States	The steamer was destroyed by fire at Lyons, Iowa.

=== 18 June ===
List of shipwrecks: 18 June 1894
Ship	State	Description
Mary J. Wells	United States	The schooner caught fire and was beached/wrecked at Whitehead, Nova Scotia. The crew were saved.
Plymouth	United States	The steamer struck Spindle Rock on Rose Island in Narragansett Bay. Refloated on 24 June and taken to New York for repairs.

=== 19 June ===
List of shipwrecks: 19 June 1894
Ship	State	Description
City of Madison	United States	The steamer struck a stone dike at Madison, Indiana and sank in shallow water in the Ohio River, a total loss. Wreck removed by the snagboat E. A. Woodruff (United States).

=== 21 June ===
List of shipwrecks: 21 June 1894
Ship	State	Description
James McFadden	United States	The steamer sprang a leak while lying off Ship John Shoal Light in Delaware Bay and sank.

=== 23 June ===
List of shipwrecks: 23 June 1894
Ship	State	Description
City of Sheffield	United States	The passenger steamer struck an obstruction and sank in five feet (1.5 m) of water in the Grand Chain in the Ohio River. Raised and repaired.

=== 24 June ===
List of shipwrecks: 24 June 1894
Ship	State	Description
Ellen M.	United States	The pleasure launch foundered in Lake St. Clair in a severe squall. The owner and two young women died.
James D. Nicol	United States	The tug sank on the New York fishing banks. 35 died.

=== 25 June ===
List of shipwrecks: 25 June 1894
Ship	State	Description
Essen	United States	The lighter was sunk in a collision on the Cuyahoga River with Northwest (United States). Later raised.

== July ==
=== 1 July ===
List of shipwrecks: 1 July 1894
Ship	State	Description
Aztec	United States	The yacht was struck by Sam Sloan (United States) in Hell Gate in the East River and was beached to prevent sinking.
Bell	United States	The steamer was struck by a Tornado and sunk at Caruthersville, Missouri. Raised and repaired.

=== 5 July ===
List of shipwrecks: 5 July 1894
Ship	State	Description
Dayton	United States	The launch caught fire and was beached on Governor's Island.
Valkyrie II	United Kingdom	Collided with the yacht Santanita (United Kingdom) and sank.

=== 8 July ===
List of shipwrecks: 8 July 1894
Ship	State	Description
D. Murchison	United States	The steamer was destroyed by fire two miles (3.2 km) below Wilmington, North Carolina.
George Hays	United States	The steamer was destroyed by fire in the Mississippi River at Raspberry Island near St. Paul, Minnesota. Later raised.

=== 10 July ===
List of shipwrecks: 10 July 1894
Ship	State	Description
Alice	United States	The 13.2-ton, 34.5-foot (10.5 m) schooner-rigged vessel broke loose from her moorings and was washed ashore at Anchor Point, District of Alaska. Her crew of three survived, but she became a total loss.
Geo. W. Jones	United States	The lighter caught fire in Boston Harbor and was destroyed.
Glendon	United States	The lighter was destroyed by fire in Boston Harbor when her tow, Geo. W. Jones (United States), caught fire and was destroyed, a total loss .

=== 17 July ===
List of shipwrecks: 17 July 1894
Ship	State	Description
Cepheus	United States	The steamer was damaged in a collision with Cetus (United States) in thick fog off Nortons Point Light, Coney Island and was beached, but sank.

=== 18 July ===
List of shipwrecks: 18 July 1894
Ship	State	Description
Old Hickory No. 2	United States	The sawmill boat sprang a leak and sank near West Point, Kentucky in the Ohio River, a total loss.

=== 19 July ===
List of shipwrecks: 19 July 1894
Ship	State	Description
G. B. Monteith	United States	The passenger steamer struck an obstruction and sank in the Ohio River above Owensboro, Kentucky near Little Island. Raised and repaired.
Hotspur	United States	The tow steamer struck a ledge of rock and sprung a leak just below the Louisville and Portland Canal and sank in 15 feet (4.6 m) of water in the Ohio River. Raised 23 July and taken to Louisville for repair.
Lorna	United States	The yacht was damaged in a collision with fishing steamer Nat Strong (United States) off Green Point, Brooklyn, stoving in her bow and causing her to sink of Sands Point, New York.

=== 20 July ===
List of shipwrecks: 20 July 1894
Ship	State	Description
Golden Rule	United States	The brig was sunk in a collision with Chattahoochee (United States) in dense fog off the Nantucket South Shoal, a total loss.

=== 23 July ===
List of shipwrecks: 23 July 1894
Ship	State	Description
Favorite	United States	The steamer burned to the waterline at her dock at the foot of Railroad Avenue, Newark, New Jersey.

=== 24 July ===
List of shipwrecks: 24 July 1894
Ship	State	Description
City of Winona	United States	The steamer struck an obstruction and sank in six feet (1.8 m) of water in the Mississippi River at Chimney Rock Bend. Raised and repaired.

=== 25 July ===
List of shipwrecks: 25 July 1894
Ship	State	Description
Kowshing	United Kingdom	Illustration of Kowshing's survivors being rescued by boats from the steamer Le Lion (France), from Le Petit Journal, August 1894 First Sino-Japanese War, Kowshing Incident: The steamer, carrying Chinese troops, was sunk by gunfire by the protected cruiser Naniwa (Imperial Japanese Navy) in the Yellow Sea off Asan, Chungcheongnam-do, Korea, with the loss of around 800 lives.
Kwang-yi	Imperial Chinese Navy	First Sino-Japanese War: Battle of Pungdo: The gunboat ran aground on rocks in the Yellow Sea off Asan, Chungcheongnam-do, Korea, during combat with Imperial Japanese Navy cruisers and was destroyed when her ammunition magazine exploded.

=== 26 July ===
List of shipwrecks: 26 July 1894
Ship	State	Description
J. E. Stevens	United States	The steamer burned at dock in Mayport, Florida.
Shamokin	United States	The barge was sunk in a collision in thick fog with H. M. Whitney (United States) near Pollock Rip Shoal. Crew rescued by H. M. Whitney.

=== 28 July ===
List of shipwrecks: 28 July 1894
Ship	State	Description
Castor	Netherlands	The passenger ship was in collision with the barque Ernst (Germany) and sank in the English Channel 5 nautical miles (9.3 km; 5.8 mi) south south west of Folkestone, Kent, United Kingdom. All 28 people on board were rescued.

=== 29 July ===
List of shipwrecks: 29 July 1894
Ship	State	Description
Glad Tidings	United States	The schooner sank almost instantly with the loss of her entire crew of four when she collided with the whaleback steamer Pathfinder (flag unknown) in the Detroit River near Ecorse, Michigan.
Unidentified schooner		The schooner was sunk in a collision with Pathfinder (United States) in the Detroit River.

=== 30 July ===
List of shipwrecks: 30 July 1894
Ship	State	Description
Nicosia	Canada	The barque ran aground and was wrecked on the south coast of Cape Sable Island, Nova Scotia. Her eighteen crew survived. She was on a voyage from Dublin, United Kingdom to Saint John, New Brunswick.

=== 31 July ===
List of shipwrecks: 31 July 1894
Ship	State	Description
Edwin J. Wood	United States	The passenger steamer struck an obstruction and sank in shallow water between Evansville, Indiana and Spottsville, Kentucky. Raised and repaired.

=== Unknown date ===
List of shipwrecks: Unknown date in July 1894
Ship	State	Description
Tarapaca	Chile	The cargo ship was wrecked on the Chilean coast.

== August ==
=== 1 August ===
List of shipwrecks: 1 August 1894
Ship	State	Description
Grenadier	United Kingdom	Collided with steamer August Korff in fog during early morning hours and sank within half an hour.
Menomonie	United States	The steamer struck a snag and sank in the Mississippi River at Sturgeon Bend 14 miles (23 km) below Prescott, Wisconsin. Later raised.

=== 2 August ===
List of shipwrecks: 2 August 1894
Ship	State	Description
Columbia	United States	The steamer burned to the waterline in the Columbia River four miles (6.4 km) into Canada.

=== 3 August ===
List of shipwrecks: 3 August 1894
Ship	State	Description
Enterprise	United States	The canal boat was destroyed by fire in the Oswego Canal.

=== 4 August ===
List of shipwrecks: 4 August 1894
Ship	State	Description
John Lang	United States	The launch was damaged in a collision with the schooner Douglas L. Hayner (United States) near Execution Lighthouse, New York in the East River and was beached. The captain's wife died.
Marie	United States	The steamer was destroyed by fire at Orton's Wharf on the Cape Fear River 15 miles (24 km) below Wilmington, North Carolina.
Reindeer	United States	The 357.49-gross register ton, 119.7-foot (36.5 m) bark was forced ashore by wind and ice and wrecked without loss of life at Return Reef off Midway Island (70°27′N 148°47′W) off the Beaufort Sea coast of the District of Alaska.

=== 5 August ===
List of shipwrecks: 5 August 1894
Ship	State	Description
Reindeer	United States	The steamer struck an obstruction and sank in 16 feet (4.9 m) of water in Coon Slough. Raised and repaired.

=== 6 August ===
List of shipwrecks: 6 August 1894
Ship	State	Description
Mystery	United States	The pleasure steamer was struck and sunk by the ferry George H. Power (United States) due to a steering failure near the lighthouse between Hudson and Athens, New York.

=== 7 August ===
List of shipwrecks: 7 August 1894
Ship	State	Description
Roanoke	United States	The steamer was destroyed by fire in Lake Superior 20 miles (32 km) off Ontonagon, Michigan due to an exploding lamp in the engine room. Her crew abandoned ship in her boats before midnight and were rescued by George Spencer (United States) in the morning.
William H. Foye	United States	The schooner wrecked in the Magdalen Islands by mistaking Entry Island Light for Gow Head Light. Crew saved.

=== 8 August ===
List of shipwrecks: 8 August 1894
Ship	State	Description
O. J. True	United States	The tow steamer was sunk in a collision with tow steamer John E. Monk (United States) in Sandusky Bay.
Park Bluff	United States	The passenger steamer was sunk when she struck a snag in the Mississippi River at Keokuk, Iowa. Raised and repaired.

=== 9 August ===
List of shipwrecks: 9 August 1894
Ship	State	Description
C. Smith	United States	The steamer burned to the waterline while lying at Waterloo, Alabama in the Tennessee River.

=== 10 August ===
List of shipwrecks: 10 August 1894
Ship	State	Description
J. K. Graves	United States	The steamer struck a rock and sank in 12 feet (3.7 m) of water in the upper rapids of the Mississippi River. Raised and repaired.
Peek-a-boo	United States	The passenger steamer was destroyed by fire over night at dock in New Baltimore, New York.

=== 12 August ===
List of shipwrecks: 12 August 1894
Ship	State	Description
Little Albert	United States	The tow steamer sprung a leak over night and sank at Tell City, Indiana. Raised and repaired.
Richmond	United States	The steamer sank in a collision with Puritan (United States) in the St. Joseph River.

=== 20 August ===
List of shipwrecks: 20 August 1894
Ship	State	Description
Two Brothers	United States	During a voyage in the Aleutian Islands from Unalaska to Atka with a cargo of 10 tons of ship's stores, the 10.27-ton 36.3-foot (11.1 m) schooner was wrecked on the southeast side of Constantine Bay (53°57′N 166°25′W) on Unalaska Island during a gale. Her entire crew of five survived.
Verne Swain	United States	The steamer struck a snag and sank in four feet (1.2 m) of water in the Mississippi River between Albany, Illinois and Camanche, Iowa. Immediately raised and repaired.

=== 22 August ===
List of shipwrecks: 22 August 1894
Ship	State	Description
H. K. Bedford	United States	The steamer struck an obstruction at Moscow, Ohio and sank. Raised and repaired.

=== 23 August ===
List of shipwrecks: 23 August 1894
Ship	State	Description
Queen	United States	The steamer stranded on Gordon Point, Cormorant Island, British Columbia in dense fog. Refloated on 26 August and steamed to Alert Bay where she was beached for repairs. Refloated on 30 August.

=== 24 August ===
List of shipwrecks: 24 August 1894
Ship	State	Description
City of Portsmouth	United States	The steamer struck the Aqua Vitae Ledge in Salem Harbor. Before she could be refloated she caught fire and was destroyed.
O. W. Cheney	United States	The tug was sunk at dock at Sault St. Marie at the entrance to the Soo Canal when she was struck by Fayette Brown (United States).

=== 26 August ===
List of shipwrecks: 26 August 1894
Ship	State	Description
Charles Castle	United States	The tow steamer was sunk at dock in the Cuyahoga River when struck by steamer Pasadena (United States) in Sandusky Bay.
Gertrude	United Kingdom	The ship was driven ashore and wrecked at Chesil Beach, Dorset.

=== 27 August ===
List of shipwrecks: 27 August 1894
Ship	State	Description
Geo. Law	United States	The steamer burned to the waterline at dock in Bridgeton, New Jersey.

=== 29 August ===
List of shipwrecks: 29 August 1894
Ship	State	Description
Tom Spurlock	United States	The steamer was destroyed by fire at Rome, Ohio.

=== 30 August ===
List of shipwrecks: 30 August 1894
Ship	State	Description
Samuel Miller	United States	The laid up steamer was destroyed by fire at Baton Rouge, Louisiana.

=== Unknown date ===
List of shipwrecks: Unknown date August 1894
Ship	State	Description
Hibernia		The steamer sank with the loss of two crew members after colliding with the paddle steamer Prince of Wales (Isle of Man). Prince of Wales rescued one survivor.

== September ==
=== 3 September ===
List of shipwrecks: 3 September 1894
Ship	State	Description
Ida	United States	The motor schooner was sunk in a collision with Capt. Weber (United States) near Pittsburg, California in the San Joaquin River.
Matchless	United Kingdom	The pleasure yacht capsized in Morecambe Bay off northwestern England with the loss of 25 lives.

=== 7 September ===
List of shipwrecks: 7 September 1894
Ship	State	Description
John A. Woods	United States	The steamer caught fire at dock during the night at Pittsburgh. She was scuttled to extinguish the fire. Raised, repaired and returned to service.
Margery	United States	The lighter struck Londoner (flag unknown) off Cape Ann and became a total loss.

=== 8 September ===
List of shipwrecks: 8 September 1894
Ship	State	Description
Durant	United States	The steamer sank while lying at Bridesburg, Pennsylvania. Raised and taken to a marine railway at Dorchester, New Jersey.
Orient	United States	The steamer burned in the Cowlitz River at Catlin, Washington, a total loss.

=== 9 September ===
List of shipwrecks: 9 September 1894
Ship	State	Description
Colonist	United Kingdom	The coastal cargo steamer was wrecked on the Oyster Bank off Newcastle, New South Wales, Australia.
Lynn J.	United States	The steamer sprung a leak and sank 16 miles (26 km) from Grand Isle, Louisiana. Later raised.

=== 10 September ===
List of shipwrecks: 10 September 1894
Ship	State	Description
Silver Wave	United States	The steamer struck an obstruction and sank at Sulphur Springs, Ohio. Raised and repaired.

=== 11 September ===
List of shipwrecks: 11 September 1894
Ship	State	Description
Roy	United States	The freighter sank from neglect in the Arkansas River at Point Remove Creek two miles (3.2 km) above Lewisburg, a total loss.

=== 12 September ===
List of shipwrecks: 12 September 1894
Ship	State	Description
George Hurst	United States	The schooner was sunk in a collision with the tug Carroll Boys (United States) off The Battery.
J. Putnam Bradlee	United States	The steamer struck a rock and filled with water in the Weir River.

=== 13 September ===
List of shipwrecks: 13 September 1894
Ship	State	Description
Yosemite	United States	The fire boat sprung a leak and sank in Lake Michigan in five fathoms (30 ft; 9.1 m) of water.

=== 16 September ===
List of shipwrecks: 16 September 1894
Ship	State	Description
Blue Wing	United States	The passenger steamer sank in the Mississippi River at Craighead Point opposite Fort Pillow, 60 miles (97 km) above Memphis, Tennessee, a total loss.

=== 17 September ===
List of shipwrecks: 17 September 1894
Ship	State	Description
Chaoyong	Imperial Chinese Navy	First Sino-Japanese War: Battle of the Yalu River: The cruiser was beached and abandoned after suffering heavy damage in combat with the protected cruisers Akitsushima, Naniwa, Takachiho, and Yoshino (all Imperial Japanese Navy) in the Yellow Sea off the mouth of the Yalu River. The Japanese destroyed her wreck with explosive charges the next day.
Golden Gate	United States	The steamer, while lying ashore at Longport, New Jersey, careened, caught fire and was destroyed.
Jingyuan	Imperial Chinese Navy	First Sino-Japanese War: Battle of the Yalu River: The armored cruiser exploded, capsized, and sank in the Yellow Sea off the mouth of the Yalu River with the loss of 263 lives during combat with Imperial Japanese Navy warships. Seven of her crew survived.
Kwan Chia	Imperial Chinese Navy	First Sino-Japanese War: Battle of the Yalu River: The dispatch vessel was badly damaged during combat with Imperial Japanese Navy warships in the Yellow Sea off the mouth of the Yalu River and was beached near Port Arthur, becoming a total loss.
Yangwei	Imperial Chinese Navy	First Sino-Japanese War: Battle of the Yalu River: The cruiser suffered heavy damage in combat with the protected cruisers Akitsushima, Naniwa, Takachiho, and Yoshino (all Imperial Japanese Navy) in the Yellow Sea off the mouth of the Yalu River, then sank after colliding with the armored cruiser Jingyuan (Imperial Chinese Navy).
Zhiyuan	Imperial Chinese Navy	First Sino-Japanese War: Battle of the Yalu River: The protected cruiser exploded and sank in the Yellow Sea off the mouth of the Yalu River with the loss of 245 lives during combat with Imperial Japanese Navy warships. Seven of her crew survived.

=== 18 September ===
List of shipwrecks: 18 September 1894
Ship	State	Description
George N Wilcox	Germany	The barque was wrecked near Ilio Point, Molokai, Hawaii after being caught by strong currents. Her crew survived. She was on a voyage from Middlesbrough, United Kingdom to Honolulu with coal, liquor and general cargo.
John B. McMahon	United States	The canal boat was sunk in a collision with the ferry Maryland (United States) that also struck the tug Wm. C. Nicol (United States) which was towing John B. McMahon off Pier 5 in the East River.

=== 22 September ===
List of shipwrecks: 22 September 1894
Ship	State	Description
Comet	United States	The steamer burned at Covington, Kentucky while undergoing repairs when a lamp was overturned, a total loss.<
James Pickands	United States	The steamer stranded on Eagle River Reef, or Sawtooth Reef, in dense smoke and fog off Keweenaw Point in Lake Superior. She broke in two during a storm on 25 September, a total loss.

=== 23 September ===
List of shipwrecks: 23 September 1894
Ship	State	Description
Belmont	United States	The steamer while lying at Cramer Hill, Camden, New Jersey caught fire and burned to the waterline.
Willamette Chief	United States	The steamer burned at dock in Portland, Oregon when set afire by a burning unknown barge, a total loss.

=== 25 September ===
List of shipwrecks: 25 September 1894
Ship	State	Description
Clara Brown	United States	The steamer was damaged by a boom in the Snohomish River and was beached to prevent sinking in deep water.
Dolphin	United States	The steamer while lying at Mauricetown, New Jersey caught fire and burned to the water's edge.

=== 26 September ===
List of shipwrecks: 26 September 1894
Ship	State	Description
Ironton	United States	The schooner barge was under tow in ballast along with the schooner barge Moonlight (United States), also in ballast, by the steamer Charles J. Kershaw on a voyage from Ashtabula, Ohio, to Marquette, Michigan, when Charles J. Kershaw′s steam engine broke down in Lake Huron off the coast of Michigan a few miles north of New Presque Isle Light. With a strong south wind pushing the two schooner barges toward Charles J. Kershaw, Moonlight′s crew cut Ironton′s tow line to free the two schooner barges from the steamer and prevent a collision. Ironton drifted into the path of the steamer Ohio, which collided with Ironton head-on and sank quickly. Ironton then drifted out of sight of ships rescuing Ohio′s crew and sank an hour after the collision. Her crew of seven tried to abandon ship in her yawl, but the yawl remained tied to Ironton, which pulled the yawl to the bottom when she sank. Ironton′s captain and four other crewmen drowned, leaving two survivors clinging to wreckage. The steamer Charles Hebard (United States) rescued the two men a few hours later.
Ohio	United States	Ohio During a voyage from Duluth, Minnesota, to Ogdensburg, New York, with a cargo of corn, the wooden steam bulk carrier sank in 300 feet (91 m) of water in Thunder Bay on the coast of Lake Huron eight miles (13 km) northeast of Presque Isle, Michigan, at 45.484152°N 83.484199°W after colliding with the schooner barge Ironton. Her entire crew of 22 survived.
William Home	United States	During a voyage from Manistique, Michigan, to Buffalo, New York, with a cargo of 579 tons of pig iron, under tow by the steamer F. R. Buell (United States), the schooner heeled over and sank in Lake Michigan off Seul Choix Point on the coast of Michigan during a gale after her cargo shifted. Her crew of seven abandoned ship in a yawl, but six of them died when the yawl capsized. The lone survivor clung to the overturned yawl and reached shore near Seul Choix Light.

=== 27 September ===
List of shipwrecks: 27 September 1894
Ship	State	Description
Dorunda	United Kingdom	The steamer struck rocks off the Burlings Lighthouse, Portugal and was beached.

=== 28 September ===
List of shipwrecks: 28 September 1894
Ship	State	Description
S. Shaw	United States	The steamer while lying at Williams Street Wharf, Philadelphia caught fire and sank.

=== Unknown date ===
List of shipwrecks: Unknown September 1894
Ship	State	Description
Ivanhoe	United States	The schooner left a west coast port on 27 September and vanished.

== October ==
=== 1 October ===
List of shipwrecks: 1 October 1894
Ship	State	Description
Allegheny	United Kingdom	The steamer collided with the tanker Caucase (Belgium) in the Delaware River and sank. She later was raised, repaired, and returned to service.
Ariadne	United States	The steamer struck a reef in the Mississippi River, capsized and sank near Cairo, Illinois. Later raised.
Martha C.	United States	The anchored schooner was wrecked in a heavy gale when dashed on the rocks at Bear Head, Newfoundland. Her crew was rescued a week later.

=== 6 October ===
List of shipwrecks: 6 October 1894
Ship	State	Description
City of Albany	United States	The steamer, laid up for the Winter in the Harlem River, was destroyed by fire.
George Jurgens	United States	The vessel was cut in two in a collision with a foreign vessel in the Gulf of Mexico, between Cedar Key, Florida and Mobile, Alabama. Four crewmen killed.

=== 7 October ===
List of shipwrecks: 7 October 1894
Ship	State	Description
Welcome	United States	The steamer left her moorings at Portland, Maine without anyone on board during the night. She caught fire, burned to the waterline and sank.

=== 8 October ===
List of shipwrecks: 8 October 1894
Ship	State	Description
David Mitchell	United States	The fishing vessel sank in a storm. Seven crewmen killed.
Mary Potter	United States	The schooner was beached during a storm on Santa Rosa Island, Florida. Possibly refloated, repaired and returned to service.
Sea Foam	United States	The fishing vessel sank in a storm. Four crewmen killed.

=== 10 October ===
List of shipwrecks: 10 October 1894
Ship	State	Description
Eunice Cobb	United States	The launch sprang a leak and sank at Pier 47 South, Philadelphia.
Fire Fly	United States	Florida Panhandle Hurricane of 1894: The fishing steamer dragged anchor and went ashore on Rocky Point, New York on Long Island. After several attempts to refloat failed she was abandoned as a total loss after the boiler and engine were salvaged.
Lillian	United States	Florida Panhandle Hurricane of 1894: The steamer foundered in a gale while at anchor at Port Charlotte, Florida.
Majella	United States	Florida Panhandle Hurricane of 1894: The steamer was wrecked on a breakwater at Point Judith in a hurricane, a total loss. A line was found wrapped around her wheel. Lost with all five hands.

=== 11 October ===
List of shipwrecks: 11 October 1894
Ship	State	Description
E. G. Ragon	United States	The passenger steamer struck a snag and sank in eight feet (2.4 m) of water at Soudrels, Indiana. Raised and repaired.

=== 12 October ===
List of shipwrecks: 12 October 1894
Ship	State	Description
Joseph Kellogg	United States	The steamer was holed by a stump on a dropping tide in the Cowlitz River at Gilbert's Mill and sank.
Mist	United States	After her anchor chains parted during a storm, the 17.87-net register ton, 50-foot (15.2 m) schooner drifted ashore and was dashed to pieces at or near Sitka, District of Alaska. Her crew of three survived.

=== 13 October ===
List of shipwrecks: 13 October 1894
Ship	State	Description
Albert S. Willis	United States	The tow steamer was sunk when she struck a snag in the Mississippi River at Cape Girardeau, a total loss.
Alva Bradley	United States	During a voyage from Fairport, Ohio, to Milwaukee, Wisconsin, with a cargo of steel billets, the 649-gross register ton, 189-foot (58 m) schooner sank during a gale in northern Lake Michigan off the coast of Michigan between North Manitou Island and South Manitou Island. The six men and one woman aboard were rescued by a United States Life-Saving Service crew from North Manitou Island.

=== 20 October ===
List of shipwrecks: 20 October 1894
Ship	State	Description
F. A. Kerker	United States	The tug was sunk in a collision with the ferry Mauch Chunk (United States) in the lower end of the Buttermilk Channel in Upper New York Bay in New York City. Her engineer was killed.

=== 21 October ===
List of shipwrecks: 21 October 1894
Ship	State	Description
Drew	United States	With 150 passengers aboard, the sidewheel paddle steamer ran aground in heavy fog on Washington Point at the northern end of Manhattan in New York City. After her passengers disembarked onto Manhattan Island via gangplank, the sidewheel paddle steamer Shady Side (United States) pulled her off the rocks after the tide rose.
Three unidentified ships		The ships ran aground in heavy fog at New York City.

=== 24 October ===
List of shipwrecks: 24 October 1894
Ship	State	Description
Eva Belle Cain	United States	The steamer sank at dock at Georgetown, Washington, D.C. when she hung up on the dock on a rising tide. One crewman killed.
Vennerne	Norway	The barque was driven ashore at Worms Head, Glamorgan, United Kingdom and was wrecked. All ten people on board survived.
Wairarapa	(United Kingdom of Great Britain and Ireland) New Zealand	Wairarapa The passenger steamer was on a voyage from Auckland, New Zealand, to Australia when she hit a reef at the northern edge of Great Barrier Island, about 100 kilometres (54 nmi) from Auckland, and sank with the loss of about 140 lives. It remains one of the deadliest maritime disasters in New Zealand's history.

=== 25 October ===
List of shipwrecks: 25 October 1894
Ship	State	Description
George R. White	United States	After her captain mailed a letter from Unalaska, District of Alaska, dated 25 October expressing his intention to follow the fur seal herds south to the tropics in the fall of 1894 and then back north in the spring of 1895, the 37.6-gross register ton, 61.2-foot (18.7 m) sealing schooner and her 15-man crew were never heard from again.

=== 27 October ===
List of shipwrecks: 27 October 1894
Ship	State	Description
D. M. Wilson	United States	The wooden steamer, a bulk carrier, sprang a leak while in Lake Huron during a voyage to Milwaukee, Wisconsin, with a cargo of coal. The steamers Hudson and Samuel Mitchell (both United States) took her in tow, but she foundered in 40 feet (12 m) of water off the coast of Michigan in Thunder Bay 2 miles (3.2 km) north of Thunder Bay Island. She broke up in a gale on 6 November. Her wreck was located in 1907 in 40 feet (12 m) at 45.065333°N 83.182133°W. Much of her machinery was salvaged.

=== 28 October ===
List of shipwrecks: 28 October 1894
Ship	State	Description
Ada	United States	The barge, being towed by Zouave (United States), was struck and sunk by the barge J. F. Merry (United States) when she lost her towline to her tug Sea King (United States) near Hell Gate in the East River.

=== 29 October ===
List of shipwrecks: 29 October 1894
Ship	State	Description
Quickstep	United States	The tug when leaving dock was struck and sunk by the tug Harlem River No. 1 (United States) that was going into dock at Palmer's Dock, Williamsburg, Brooklyn.

=== 31 October ===
List of shipwrecks: 31 October 1894
Ship	State	Description
J. R. Worswick	United States	The tow steamer sprung a leak and sank in Lake Erie 2 miles (3.2 km) off Cleveland, Ohio due to a burst pipe. Her crew rescued by a passing tug.
John F. Allen	United States	The steamer struck a snag and sank at Red Cross Landing, Mississippi in the Tallahatchie River. Later raised.

=== Unknown date ===
List of shipwrecks: Unknown October 1894
Ship	State	Description
Nina	Norway	The barque ran aground and was wrecked in an unknown location sometime in October.

== November ==
=== 2 November ===
List of shipwrecks: 2 November 1894
Ship	State	Description
Silver Spring	United States	The steamer was wrecked after a line fouled her prop in heavy seas at Rockport, California.
Talifoo	United Kingdom	The 86.7-foot (26.4 m), 91.4-ton trawler was wrecked between Muck, Scotland and Horse Rocks in rain. She broke up in the stormy weather over the next couple of days.

=== 3 November ===
List of shipwrecks: 3 November 1894
Ship	State	Description
E. P. Ross	United States	The steamer was destroyed by fire at Oswego, New York.

=== 4 November ===
List of shipwrecks: 4 November 1894
Ship	State	Description
Jerrie	United States	The laid up steamer was destroyed by fire at Ashland, Kentucky, a total loss.
Marguerite	United States	The steamer was destroyed in a boat house when a warehouse burned at Ogdensburg, New York.

=== 5 November ===
List of shipwrecks: 5 November 1894
Ship	State	Description
Mark Winnett	United States	The steamer sank when her hog chains broke at Industry, Pennsylvania in the Ohio River. Raised and repaired.
S. C. Baldwin	United States	The steamer was sunk in the St. Clair River at Marine City, Michigan in a collision with Iron King (United States). Raised 9 November and taken to Port Huron, Michigan for repairs. She suffered a fire on board during repairs on 1 December. Back in service by 1 August 1895.
San Pedro	United States	SS San Pedro The schooner-rigged wrecking steamer sank near Point Conception, California, while performing salvage work on the wreck of Gosford. She had been abandoned when she caught fire on 4 November because of dynamite on board.

=== 6 November ===
List of shipwrecks: 6 November 1894
Ship	State	Description
Albatross	United Kingdom	The 101-foot (31 m) trawler was rammed and sunk by Duke of Clarence (United Kingdom) on the Bahama Bank. Three crew rescued by Duke of Clarence, 5 lost.
Crusader	United States	The steamer burned at dock over night at Sault Ste. Marie, a total loss. Her two firemen died.
Mary and Norman	United States	The fishing steamer was destroyed by fire at dock at Vermillion, Ohio.
William H. Barrett	United States	The steamer was destroyed by fire at dock at Grand Rapids, Michigan.

=== 8 November ===
List of shipwrecks: 8 November 1894
Ship	State	Description
J. A. Blackmore	United States	The steamer, laid up waiting to be broken up, sank at dock in Pittsburgh.

=== 10 November ===
List of shipwrecks: 10 November 1894
Ship	State	Description
Circassia	Norway	The barque was wrecked near the mouth of the Qora River, Cape Colony. All on board survived.

=== 12 November ===
List of shipwrecks: 12 November 1894
Ship	State	Description
L. W. Wetmore	United States	The steamer struck a reef off Centerville, Wisconsin in a heavy wind and snow storm. She was scuttled and abandoned, but pulled off a few days later.

=== 13 November ===
List of shipwrecks: 13 November 1894
Ship	State	Description
John L. Shaw	United States	While on a voyage to Chicago, Illinois, with a cargo of coal, the wooden schooner sank in Lake Huron off Harrisville, Michigan, during a snowstorm. Her wreck lies in 128 feet (39 m) of water at 44.616667°N 83.133333°W.
Wasp	United States	The laid up steamer sprang a leak and sank at Algiers, Louisiana, a total loss.

=== 16 November ===
List of shipwrecks: 16 November 1894
Ship	State	Description
Lily Turner	United States	The steamer sank at Eagle Point, Iowa due to a defective sea cock. Raised and repaired.

=== 18 November ===
List of shipwrecks: 18 November 1894
Ship	State	Description
X. L.	United States	The steamer struck a snag and sank in the Oclockony River. Later raised.

=== 19 November ===
List of shipwrecks: 19 November 1894
Ship	State	Description
Eddie	United States	The junk was sunk in the Buffalo River at Buffalo, New York in a collision with Alex. H. Sloan (United States) 1,000 feet (300 m) above the Michigan Street bridge.
F. A. Kappalla	United States	The tug caught fire off Hunters Point, Queens, in the East River. She was run ashore where she was destroyed by the fire.

=== 21 November ===
List of shipwrecks: 21 November 1894
Ship	State	Description
Ozama	United States	The cargo ship ran aground on Cape Romain Shoals, South Carolina and sank. Wreck located in 1979.

=== 22 November ===
List of shipwrecks: 22 November 1894
Ship	State	Description
Unknown schooner	United States	The schooner was sunk in a collision with Georgia (United States) in Chesapeake Bay near Thomas Point.

=== 23 November ===
List of shipwrecks: 23 November 1894
Ship	State	Description
Ozama	United States	The cargo steamer ran aground on the outer shoal off Cape Romain, South Carolina, then floated off and sank.

=== 24 November ===
List of shipwrecks: 24 November 1894
Ship	State	Description
Gracie H. Benson	United States	The schooner was sunk in a collision with Reading (United States) in lower Boston Harbor. Six crewmen killed.
Lettie G. Howard	United States	The schooner went ashore by the Highland Light, Cape Cod. Later refloated. Her crew was rescued by the United States Life Saving Service.

=== 26 November ===
List of shipwrecks: 26 November 1894
Ship	State	Description
B. Brandeth	United States	The lighter was sunk in a collision with the tug Brinton (United States) in the East River.

=== 27 November ===
List of shipwrecks: 27 November 1894
Ship	State	Description
Magnolia	United States	The schooner went ashore on Pass Island near Despair Bay, Nova Scotia, a cabin stove overturned and she burned to the waterline. Her crew made it to shore in her dories.

=== 29 November ===
List of shipwrecks: 29 November 1894
Ship	State	Description
Susie	United States	The steamer sank at the Northern Pacific Wharf, Tacoma, Washington as a result of a landslide.

=== 30 November ===
List of shipwrecks: 30 November 1894
Ship	State	Description
John P. Thorn	United States	The steamer was destroyed by fire over night at dock in Pittsburgh.
John T. Hoffman	United States	The steamer burned at dock at Portland, Maine, a total loss.

=== Unknown date ===
List of shipwrecks: Unknown November 1894
Ship	State	Description
Oriole	United States	The schooner was wrecked sometime in November in an unknown location.

== December ==
=== 1 December ===
List of shipwrecks: 1 December 1894
Ship	State	Description
Dora	United States	The passenger steamer was sunk when she struck a snag in the Mississippi River ten miles (16 km) above St. Louis, a total loss.

=== 3 December ===
List of shipwrecks: 3 December 1894
Ship	State	Description
Maggie E. MacKenzie	United States	The fishing schooner was wrecked at Point Platte, Miquelon Island. Her crew made it to shore.

=== 5 December ===
List of shipwrecks: 5 December 1894
Ship	State	Description
Inez	United States	The launch was sunk in a collision in fog with Buckeye State (United States) off Island No. 8, in the Mississippi River 55 miles (89 km) below Cairo, Illinois, a total loss.
J. W. Haring	United States	The steamer was sunk in a collision with Plymouth (United States) in Albemarle Sound near the mouth of the Chowan River.

=== 7 December ===
List of shipwrecks: 7 December 1894
Ship	State	Description
New York Central No. 2	United States	The tug was sunk in a collision with the ferry Hopatcong (United States) off Pier 46 in the North River.

=== 8 December ===
List of shipwrecks: 8 December 1894
Ship	State	Description
Corinne	United States	The steamer was destroyed by fire at dock in St. Marys, Florida, a total loss.

=== 9 December ===
List of shipwrecks: 9 December 1894
Ship	State	Description
George L. Bass	United States	The passenger steamer was sunk when she struck a snag in the Mississippi River three miles (4.8 km) above Alton, Illinois. Later raised.

=== 10 December ===
List of shipwrecks: 10 December 1894
Ship	State	Description
Allen J. Duncan	United States	The steamer struck a log and sank in ten feet (3.0 m) of water at Webb's Landing in the Tennessee River.
Ione	United States	The steamer struck a rock and sank at Kiernan's Quarry in the Columbia River.

=== 12 December ===
List of shipwrecks: 12 December 1894
Ship	State	Description
Richard C. Steele	United States	The schooner was wrecked on Devils Back in Boston Harbor. Refloated by lighters on 15 December, taken to Boston, condemned and stripped.

=== 13 December ===
List of shipwrecks: 13 December 1894
Ship	State	Description
City of Paducah	United States	The passenger steamer was sunk when she struck a snag in the Mississippi River 86 miles (138 km) below St. Louis. Later raised.

=== 14 December ===
List of shipwrecks: 14 December 1894
Ship	State	Description
Caledonia	Netherlands	The ship stranded near Katwijk. She later broke in two and was a total loss.

=== 17 December ===
List of shipwrecks: 17 December 1894
Ship	State	Description
117S	Regia Marina	The torpedo boat was lost in the Adriatic Sea near Brindisi, Italy.
Oriole	United States	The steamer caught fire off New Castle, Delaware and was beached at New Castle. She is under water at high tide.

=== 21 December ===
List of shipwrecks: 21 December 1894
Ship	State	Description
Betsy	United Kingdom	The Great Storm of 21–22 December 1894: The fishing smack was driven ashore by the sleet and snowstorm off Hoylake.
City of Birmingham	United Kingdom	The Great Storm of 21–22 December 1894: The 143-ton trawler was lost with all hands in the North Sea.
North East	United Kingdom	The Great Storm of 21–22 December 1894: The 123 ton steam trawler departed Aberdeen and was lost with the loss of all eight crew.

=== 22 December ===
List of shipwrecks: 22 December 1894
Ship	State	Description
Abana	Norway	Abana The Great Storm of 21–22 December 1894: The barque was wrecked at Blackpool, Lancashire. Her entire crew of 17 and the ship's dog and cat were saved.
Active	United States	The steamer sprung a leak in the St. Johns River, Florida. When her helm was put hard over into a turn she listed, filled, and sank, with the loss of two of her crew. She was later raised.
Annie Pickup	United Kingdom	The Great Storm of 21–22 December 1894: The schooner was lost. Crew rescued by "Maude Pickup" (United Kingdom).
Atlantic	Norway	The Great Storm of 21–22 December 1894: The 377-ton barque was wrecked on West Hoyle Bank with the loss of all 7 hands.
Australia	Norway	The Great Storm of 21–22 December 1894: The 158.1-foot (48.2 m), 715-ton barque was driven ashore near Finnart Point and wrecked, with the loss of 4 of the 11 crew.
Bonito	Germany	The Great Storm of 21–22 December 1894: The 127-ton steam trawler was lost in the North Sea.
Carri	United Kingdom	The Great Storm of 21–22 December 1894: The 44-ton barge sank about 500 yards (460 m) from the lightship opposite Garston locks. The crew survived.
Clutha	United Kingdom	The Great Storm of 21–22 December 1894: The 594-ton, 194.5-foot (59.3 m) steam schooner departed Middlesbrough on 21 December and vanished, probably lost on 22 December with all hands in the North Sea.
Cornelia Johanna	Netherlands	The Great Storm of 21–22 December 1894: The fishing trawler ran aground and was severely damaged. Refloated, repaired and returned to service.
De Drie Gebroeders	Netherlands	The Great Storm of 21–22 December 1894: The fishing trawler ran aground and was severely damaged near Egmond aan Zee.
De Onderneming	Netherlands	The Great Storm of 21–22 December 1894: The fishing trawler was wrecked on Egmond aan Zee Beach. Scrapped in 1895.
Doctor	United Kingdom	The Great Storm of 21–22 December 1894: The 103-foot (31 m), 148-ton brig dragged anchor at Carrickfergus and was driven across Belfast Lough by a storm and struck Ballymacormick Point on the side of Groomsport. Two crew were lost.
Economy	United Kingdom	The Great Storm of 21–22 December 1894: The 145-ton trawler sank in the North Sea with the loss of ten crew.
Eide	Germany	The Great Storm of 21–22 December 1894: The 102.7-foot (31.3 m), 139-ton steam trawler was lost in the North Sea.
Elisabeth Jacoba	Netherlands	The Great Storm of 21–22 December 1894: The fishing trawler was wrecked near Egmond aan Zee. Scrapped in 1895
Ellen and Ann	United Kingdom	The Great Storm of 21–22 December 1894: The 51.3-foot (15.6 m) fishing smack was driven ashore in the sleet and snow storm off Birkdale, Southport, in the Ribble Estuary and broke up. Lost with all 5 hands.
Energy	United Kingdom	The Great Storm of 21–22 December 1894: The 145-ton trawler sank in the North Sea with the loss of 12 crew.
England	United Kingdom	The Great Storm of 21–22 December 1894: The 139-ton trawler sank in the North Sea on the edge of the Dogger Bank with the loss of all nine crew.
Excel	United Kingdom	The Great Storm of 21–22 December 1894: The fishing vessel sank in the North Sea with the loss of all five crew.
Express	United Kingdom	The Great Storm of 21–22 December 1894: The 156-ton trawler sank in the North Sea with the loss of all ten crew.
Genesta	United Kingdom	The Great Storm of 21–22 December 1894: The smack was lost with all hands off Blackpool.
Gertrude & Ethel	United Kingdom	The Great Storm of 21–22 December 1894: The 84-ton fishing schooner sank in the North Sea with the loss of all six crew.
Hermann	Germany	The Great Storm of 21–22 December 1894: The 139-ton steam trawler was lost in the North Sea.
Jessie Catherine	United Kingdom	The Great Storm of 21–22 December 1894: The 31-ton smack ran aground and was wrecked in Loch Ryan.
John Sims	United Kingdom	The Great Storm of 21–22 December 1894: The 31-ton trawler sank in the North Sea with the loss of five crew.
Kirkmichael	United Kingdom	The Great Storm of 21–22 December 1894: The 202.1-foot (61.6 m) bark was wrecked on the breakwater at Holyhead while seeking shelter from the storm, with the loss of 7 of 18 crew.
Lilly	Germany	The Great Storm of 21–22 December 1894: The 105.5-foot (32.2 m), 138-ton steam trawler was lost in the North Sea.
Londesborough	United Kingdom	The Great Storm of 21–22 December 1894: The fishing ship sank in the North Sea with the loss of all six crew.
Mary Grace	United Kingdom	The Great Storm of 21–22 December 1894: The fishing ship sank in the North Sea with the loss of all three crew.
Mayflower	United Kingdom	The Great Storm of 21–22 December 1894: The 29-ton smack sank off Blackpool, or was wrecked on Shell Wharf, Rossall, with the loss of all four crew.
Minnie Brown	United Kingdom	The Great Storm of 21–22 December 1894: The 185.3-foot (56.5 m) barque was wrecked on West Hoyle Bank and broke up in a Force 10 gale with the loss of all 19 hands, plus possibly a pilot.
Morgenster	Netherlands	The Great Storm of 21–22 December 1894: The fishing trawler was wrecked near Egmond aan Zee. Scrapped in 1900.
Nordsee	Germany	The Great Storm of 21–22 December 1894: The 98.8-foot (30.1 m), 131-ton steam trawler was lost in the North Sea off Heligoland.
Oswald	United Kingdom	The Great Storm of 21–22 December 1894: The 258.9-foot (78.9 m), 1,835-ton cargo ship was wrecked one mile (1.6 km) north of Port Logan, with the loss of all 20/22 crew.
Petrel	United Kingdom	The Great Storm of 21–22 December 1894: The 25-ton smack was driven ashore at Blackpool. Her captain was washed overboard and lost.
Romantic	United Kingdom	The Great Storm of 21–22 December 1894: The 75.1-foot (22.9 m) 79-ton, ketch-rigged fishing trawler sank in the North Sea. Lost with all six hands.
Rosslyn	United Kingdom	The Great Storm of 21–22 December 1894: The 60-foot (18 m), 121-ton steam trawler was wrecked in Loch Buie, Isle of Mull.
Seamew	United Kingdom	The Great Storm of 21–22 December 1894: The 71.5-foot (21.8 m), 61-ton cargo ship ran aground and was wrecked at Portpatrick, on the Rhins of Galloway, Scotland.
Sportsman	United Kingdom	The Great Storm of 21–22 December 1894: The 61-ton, ketch-rigged fishing trawler sank in the North Sea. Lost with all three hands.
Staghound	United Kingdom	The Great Storm of 21–22 December 1894: The 101-foot (31 m), 152-ton steam trawler sank in the North Sea. Lost with all nine hands.
Stanley	Norway	The schooner was wrecked at Borbjerg.
Suprise	United Kingdom	The Great Storm of 21–22 December 1894: The 58.1-foot (17.7 m), 50-ton smack sank in Morecambe Bay off Blackpool with the loss of all four crew.
Sylphaen	United Kingdom	The Great Storm of 21–22 December 1894: The 159-ton steamship was wrecked on the Isle of Man. Later raised.
Vigilant	United Kingdom	The Great Storm of 21–22 December 1894: The 74.8-foot (22.8 m), 77-ton smack sank in the North Sea with the loss of all eight crew.
Vooruitgang	Netherlands	The Great Storm of 21–22 December 1894: The fishing trawler sank near Egmond aan Zee. Wreck demolished in 1895.
Zwaluw	Netherlands	The Great Storm of 21–22 December 1894: The fishing trawler was wrecked near IJmuiden. Broken up in 1895.

=== 23 December ===
List of shipwrecks: 23 December 1894
Ship	State	Description
Woodville	United Kingdom	The Great Storm of 21–22 December 1894: The 75.1-foot (22.9 m) 131 ton brigantine sank off Mersey with all six hands.

=== 27 December ===
List of shipwrecks: 27 December 1894
Ship	State	Description
Elenora	United States	The schooner went ashore on rocks off George J. Tarr & Company's Oil Works at Fort Point and was damaged.
G. W. Sentell	United States	The laid up steamer struck was destroyed by fire at New Orleans.

=== 28 December ===
List of shipwrecks: 28 December 1894
Ship	State	Description
Austriana	Norway	The schooner burned at anchor in Pensacola Bay, a total loss.

=== 31 December ===
List of shipwrecks: 31 December 1894
Ship	State	Description
Addie Winthrop	United States	The schooner was wrecked at Big Glace Bay, a total loss. The crew was saved.
Apalachee	United States	The steamer sank at dock at Columbus, Georgia due to a frozen suction pipe bursting. Later raised.

=== Unknown date ===
List of shipwrecks: Unknown date December 1894
Ship	State	Description
Inishtrahull	United Kingdom	The passenger-cargo ship foundered during a storm in the Atlantic Ocean off the west coast of Ireland sometime between 28 and 30 December.
Keweenaw	United States	The steamer departed Comox, British Columbia on 7 December and was never heard from again. Lost with all 29 hands.
Lillian	Canada	The barquentine was wrecked sometime in December.
Naploi	Germany	The Great Storm of 21–22 December 1894: The 255.6-foot (77.9 m), 1,296-ton collier left Shields for Hamburg, Germany, and vanished, probably lost in the "Great Storm".
Neck	Germany	The Great Storm of 21–22 December 1894: The 127-ton steam trawler apparently was lost in the North Sea after leaving port on 19 December and vanished, probably lost in the "Great Storm".
Nereide	Germany	The Great Storm of 21–22 December 1894: The 103.3-foot (31.5 m), 135-ton steam trawler apparently was lost in the North Sea after leaving port on 19 December and vanished, probably lost in the "Great Storm".
Victoria Nyanza	United Kingdom	The barque was wrecked at Iquique, Chile.

== Unknown date ==
List of shipwrecks: Unknown date 1894
Ship	State	Description
Abraham Barker	United States	The 361-ton whaling bark was wrecked on the Koryak Coast of the Kamchatka Peninsula in Siberia, 40 nautical miles (74 km) south of Cape Navarin.
Albert W. Smith	Unknown	The schooner was lost in the vicinity of "Squan Beach", a term used at the time for the coast of New Jersey near Manasquan and sometimes for the 7-mile (11 km) stretch of coast between Manasquan Inlet and Cranberry Inlet or for the entire coast of New Jersey between Sea Girt and Barnegat Inlet.
Alert	United States	The steamer was sunk in a collision with Islander (United States) near Round Island in the St Lawrence River.
Alice Isabel	United Kingdom	The Great Storm of 22 December 1894: The trawler left Grimsby on 13 December and vanished, was lost with all hands. Probably lost on 22 December's "Great Storm".
Mary H. Thomas	United States	The 94-ton trading schooner was lost in the Bering Sea.
Susan H. Ritchie	Unknown	The schooner was lost on the coast of New Jersey on 11 April 1894 between Bay Head and Mantoloking.
