= Broad Sound North Entrance Channel =

Shipping channel into Boston

Coordinates: 42°21′17″N 70°55′55″W

The Broad Sound North Entrance Channel or Boston North Channel is the deepest of three shipping channels connecting Boston Harbor to Massachusetts Bay near Boston, Massachusetts. For this reason, almost all deep-draft ships use this channel.

The 1,500-foot-wide (460 m) channel starts south of the Deer Island Light at the eastern end of the President Roads anchorage and proceeds northeastward to Broad Sound, passing eastward of Finn's Ledge. The channel's depth was recently increased to 51 feet (16 m) in order to attract the larger New Panamax ships in use since the Panama Canal expansion project's 2016 completion.

== See also ==
- Broad Sound South Entrance Channel
