= List of shipwrecks in May 1871 =

The list of shipwrecks in May 1871 includes ships sunk, foundered, grounded, or otherwise lost during May 1871.

== 1 May ==
List of shipwrecks: 1 May 1871
Ship	State	Description
Breeze	United Kingdom	The schooner was driven ashore and wrecked at Padstow, Cornwall. She was on a voyage from Padstow to Plymouth, Devon.
Ebenezer	United Kingdom	The barque ran aground on the Cannon Rocks. She was on a voyage from Belfast, County Antrim to Dublin.
Josephus	Netherlands	The steamship collided with the steamship Princess Royal (United Kingdom) and sank at Antwerp, Belgium.
Neptune	Germany	The sloop foundered. Her crew were rescued by the barque Askur (Norway). Neptune was on a voyage from Drammen to Kragerø, Norway.
Octa	United Kingdom	The steamship was driven ashore and wrecked on Terschelling, Friesland, Netherlands. She was on a voyage from Hamburg, Germany to London.
Rover	United Kingdom	The ship struck a sunken wreck. She was on a voyage from King's Lynn, Norfolk to Dunkirk, Nord, France. Sh was assisted in to Harwich, Essex in a severely leaky condition.
Unnamed	Flag unknown	The schooner ran aground on the Burbo Bank, in Liverpool Bay and sank. Her crew survived.

== 2 May ==
List of shipwrecks: 2 May 1871
Ship	State	Description
Everhardus	United Kingdom	The ship foundered 20 nautical miles (37 km) north of Montrose, Forfarshire. Her crew were rescued by the fishing boat St. Anna (United Kingdom).
Onward	United Kingdom	The steamship sank off Domesnes, Russia. Her crew survived. she was on a voyage from Hull, Yorkshire to Riga, Russia.

== 3 May ==
List of shipwrecks: 3 May 1871
Ship	State	Description
Angelsea	United Kingdom	The ship was holed by ice and sank. She was on a voyage from Greenock, Renfrewshire to Quebec City, Canada.
Lucibelle	United Kingdom	The ship was wrecked on Starbuck Island. Her crew were rescued. She was on a voyage from Sydney, New South Wales to Starbuck Island.
Mercury	France	The steamship ran aground in the Southwest Passage. She was on a voyage from New Orleans, Louisiana, United States to Havre de Grâce, Seine-Inférieure.
Rhein	Germany	The steamship ran aground off "Tinsum". She was on a voyage from New York, United States to Bremen.

== 4 May ==
List of shipwrecks: 4 May 1871
Ship	State	Description
Charles Maureau	France	The ship was wrecked at Saint-Benoît, Réunion. Her crew were rescued.
Inez	United States	The ship was wrecked on the "Isle de St. Carlos". She was on a voyage from Maracaibo, Venezuela to New York. The wreck was pillaged by the local inhabitants.
Newcastle	United Kingdom	The steamship collided with another vessel and sank. She was on a voyage from Hull, Yorkshire to South Shields, County Durham. She was refloated on 6 May and taken in to South Shields.
Surprise	United Kingdom	The schooner was driven ashore near Crail, Fife. She was refloated and taken in to Crail in a severely damaged condition.
Vale	United Kingdom	The smack sank off the Isle of Whithorn, Wigtownshire. Her crew of three were rescued by the Isle of Whithorn Lifeboat Charlie Peek ( Royal National Lifeboat Institution). Vale was on a voyage from Port Dinorwic, Caernarfonshire to Irvine, Ayrshire.

== 5 May ==
List of shipwrecks: 5 May 1871
Ship	State	Description
Christian	Denmark	The ship was abandoned in the North Sea. Her crew were rescued. She was on a voyage from Copenhagen to Leith, Lothian, United Kingdom.
Enfield	United Kingdom	The schooner ran aground on The Shingles, off the Isle of Wight. She was on a voyage from Eling, Hampshire to Swansea, Glamorgan.
Mahmoudy	India	The bugla foundered with the ultimate loss of 23 of the 45 people on board. Survivors were rescued by a steamship and a cotia. She was on a voyage from Mangalore to the Persian Gulf.

== 6 May ==
List of shipwrecks: 6 May 1871
Ship	State	Description
Carrie	United States	The steamship was destroyed by fire south of Savannah, Georgia with the loss of two lives. She was on a voyage from Augusta, Jamaica to Savannah.
David Burn	United Kingdom	The steamship was run into by the steamship Earl Percy (United Kingdom) and sank 2 nautical miles (3.7 km) off South Shields, County Durham. All on board, more than 100 people, were rescued by Earl Percy. David Burn broke in two on 10 June during efforts to raise her.
Unnamed	United Kingdom	The Thames barge collided with Cannon Street Railway Bridge, London and sank in the River Thames with the loss of one of her two crew.

== 7 May ==
List of shipwrecks: 7 May 1871
Ship	State	Description
Curlew	United Kingdom	The Mersey Flat sank at New Brighton, Cheshire.
Gromhoi	Flag unknown	The ship ran aground. She was on a voyage from Cyprus to Saint Petersburg, Russia
Prinz Adalbert	Germany	The ship ran aground. She was on a voyage from Rhyl, Denbighshire, United Kingdom to Stettin. She was refloated.
Tiber	United Kingdom	The steamship was went ashore at Crosby, Lancashire in dense fog and broke in two. She was on a voyage from Liverpool, Lancashire to Alexandria, Egypt. The two parts were refloated in June 1871 and rebuilt as a barque. She was again wrecked as Theodorus in May 1894.

== 8 May ==
List of shipwrecks: 8 May 1871
Ship	State	Description
City of Quebec	United Kingdom	The steamship was wrecked on "Dead Island", off Cape Ray, Newfoundland Colony with the loss of all seventeen crew. She was on a voyage from London to Quebec City, Canada.
Margaret Trail	United Kingdom	The ship ran aground at the mouth of the River Mersey. She was on a voyage from Runcorn, Cheshire to the Orkney Islands. She was refloated and put back to Runcorn in a leaky condition.
Nimrod	United Kingdom	The sloop was wrecked on the Sow and Pig Rocks, on the coast of Northumberland. Both crew were rescued. She was on a voyage from Kingston, Moray to Sunderland, County Durham.

== 9 May ==
List of shipwrecks: 9 May 1871
Ship	State	Description
Alert	Norway	The brig foundered in the Dogger Bank. Her crew were rescued by the smack Ann and Sarah (United Kingdom). Alert was on a voyage from Middlesbrough, Yorkshire, United Kingdom to Copenhagen, Denmark.
Erminia	United Kingdom	The yacht ran aground in the Loo Stream. She was being towed from Cowes, Isle of Wight to Brighton, Sussex. She was refloated the next day and beached at East Cowes, Isle of Wight.
Pretty Jane	United Kingdom	The steamship ran aground off Moeraki, New Zealand. She was on a voyage from the Clyde to Otago, New Zealand. She was refloated and completed her voyage.

== 10 May ==
List of shipwrecks: 10 May 1871
Ship	State	Description
Aptrness	Greece	The brig collided with the steamship Philade (Russia) and sank 15 nautical miles (28 km) off the Yeni Kale Lighthouse, Russia with the loss of eight of her thirteen crew. Aptrness was on a voyage from Taganrog, Russia to a British port.
Elizabeth	United Kingdom	The brigantine collided with the barque Bertha (Sweden) and sank off Morte Point, Devon. Her crew survived. Elizabeth was on a voyage from Workington, Cumberland to Newport, Monmouthshire.
Isabella Atkinson	United Kingdom	The barque was wrecked on the Galloper Sand. Her crew were rescued. She was on a voyage from South Shields, County Durham to Alexandria, Egypt.
Unnamed	Flag unknown	The ship ran aground on the Arklow Bank, in the Irish Sea off the coast of County Wicklow, United Kingdom.
Unnamed	France	The brigantine was driven ashore at Breaksea Point, Glamorgan, United Kingdom.

== 11 May ==
List of shipwrecks: 11 May 1871
Ship	State	Description
Fanny	United Kingdom	The ship foundered off "Magercoil". Her crew survived. She was on a voyage from Rangoon, Burma to Bombay, India.
Fyenoord	Netherlands	The steamship was run into by C. M. Palmer (United Kingdom) and was beached in the River Thames near the entrance to the West India Docks, London, United Kingdom. Fyenoord was on a voyage from London to Rotterdam, South Holland.
Prince Adalbert	Germany	The ship was driven ashore on the west coast of Denmark. She was on a voyage from Cyprus to Saint Petersburg, Russia. She was refloated and taken in to Fredrikshavn in a leaky condition.
Sofia	Norway	The ship was driven ashore near Sundby. She was on a voyage from London to Holmsund.

== 12 May ==
List of shipwrecks: 12 May 1871
Ship	State	Description
Agnes Campbell	United Kingdom	The ship was driven ashore in the Sound of Mull. She was on a voyage from Thurso, Caithness to Paisley, Renfrewshire.
Kedar	United Kingdom	The steamship ran aground at the entrance to the Sea of Marmara. She was on a voyage from Liverpool, Lancashire to Constantinople, Ottoman Empire.
Weardale	United Kingdom	The steamship ran aground on the Jambe de Mouton, off Havre de Grâce, Seine-Inférieure, France. She was on a voyage from Blyth, Northumberland to Rouen, Seine-Inférieure. She was refloated on 14 May and resumed her voyage.

== 13 May ==
List of shipwrecks: 13 May 1871
Ship	State	Description
Ann	United Kingdom	The ship sprang a leak and foundered off Barmouth, Merionethshire. Her crew were rescued.
Fleetwing	(United Kingdom of Great Britain and Ireland) Jersey	The smack collided with the steamship Sun Foo (United Kingdom) and sank in St Ives Bay with the loss of six lives. Fleetwing was on a voyage from Jersey to Runcorn, Cheshire.
Mary Russell	United Kingdom	The ship was driven ashore near "Hornbeck", Denmark. She was on a voyage from Riga, Russia to Dundee, Forfarshire. She was refloated on 15 May and towed in to Helsingør, Denmark.

== 14 May ==
List of shipwrecks: 14 May 1871
Ship	State	Description
Challenger	United Kingdom	The full-rigged ship foundered in the Atlantic Ocean (48°00′N 15°30′W). Her crew were rescued by Rapid (United Kingdom). She was on a voyage from Malden Island to London.
Star of the West	United Kingdom	The full-rigged ship was wrecked off Scatarie Island, Nova Scotia, Canada with the loss of her captain. She was on a voyage from Newcastle upon Tyne, Northumberland to Quebec City, Canada.

== 15 May ==
List of shipwrecks: 15 May 1871
Ship	State	Description
Fauna	United Kingdom	The ship ran aground on the Svenska Högarne, in the Baltic Sea. She was on a voyage from London to Sundsvall, Sweden. She was refloated and put in to Stockholm, Sweden in a leaky condition.
Jinko Maru	Japan	The disabled junk washed ashore on Adak Island in the Aleutian Islands with three survivors aboard. She had been adrift since November 1870, when a storm carried away her masts and rudder during a voyage along the coast of Japan from Ise to Kumano with a cargo of rice.

== 16 May ==
List of shipwrecks: 16 May 1871
Ship	State	Description
Gertruida Maira	Netherlands	The ship was wrecked on the coast of Patagonia, Argentina. She was on a voyage from Buenos Aires, Argentina to the Falkland Islands.
Karen Anne Sophie	Denmark	The ship was wrecked at Thyborøn. Her crew were rescued. She was on a voyage from Sunderland, County Durham, United Kingdom to the Sunnfjord.
Mezerium	United Kingdom	The brig departed from Valparaíso, Chile for the River Plate. No further trace, presumed foundered with the loss of all hands.
Sea Dog	United Kingdom	The brig was sunk by ice. Her crew were rescued. She was on a voyage from Cádiz, Spain to Saint John's, Newfoundland Colony.
Sparkler	United Kingdom	The barque was wrecked in the Sittaung River. Her nineteen crew took to two boats. Six crew in the gig were reported missing. She was on a voyage from Singapore, Straits Settlements to Moulmein, Burma.

== 17 May ==
List of shipwrecks: May 1871
Ship	State	Description
No, 29	United Kingdom	The pilot boat was driven ashore and wrecked at Curlew Point, Glamorgan.

== 18 May ==
List of shipwrecks: 18 May 1871
Ship	State	Description
Alsace and Lorraine	France	The barque was wrecked on Bird's Spit, off the coast of Sierra Leone. Her crew were rescued. She was on a voyage from Marseille, Bouches-du-Rhône to Bathurst, Gambia Colony and Protectorate.
George	Norway	The ship was driven ashore and wrecked on Langeoog, Germany. Her crew were rescued.
Lady Carleton	United Kingdom	The steamship was destroyed by fire at Carleton.
Royal Victoria	United Kingdom	The barque foundered in the Atlantic Ocean (46°27′N 34°44′W). Her crew were rescued by Wild Rose (United Kingdom). Royal Victoria was on a voyage from Hull, Yorkshire to Quebec City, Canada.

== 19 May ==
List of shipwrecks: 19 May 1871
Ship	State	Description
Idolique	Canada	The ship sprang a leak and was beached at or near Livorno, Italy in a waterlogged condition. She was on a voyage from Livorno to Baltimore, Maryland, United States.
Willem III	Netherlands	Willem III The passenger ship caught fire off the Isle of Wight, United Kingdom. All on board, 220 passengers and her crew, about 350 people in total, were rescued by the steamship Scorpio and a number of fishing boats (all United Kingdom). Willem III was on her maiden voyage, from Rotterdam, South Holland to Batavia, Netherlands East Indies. She was towed to Portsmouth, Hampshire, United Kingdom, where she was beached and scuttled. Subsequently sold, repaired and returned to service.

== 20 May ==
List of shipwrecks: 20 May 1871
Ship	State	Description
Edith Owen	United Kingdom	The steamship collided with the steamship Florence (United Kingdom) in the River Thames and was beached at Gravesend, Kent. Edith Owen was on a voyage from London to Liverpool, Lancashire.
Northumberland	United Kingdom	The ship sank off Hanko, Grand Duchy of Finland. Her crew were rescued.
T. S. Webb	United Kingdom	The steamship collided with the steamship Paraguay and sank in the English Channel off Dungeness, Kent.
Ynez	United Kingdom	The barque was wrecked at Maracaibo, Venezuela. Her seven crew were rescued by the schooner Columbian (United Kingdom). Ynez was on a voyage from Maracaibo to New York.

== 21 May ==
List of shipwrecks: 21 May 1871
Ship	State	Description
Esther Eitzen	Flag unknown	The ship ran aground at Kalk Bay, Cape Colony. She was refloated.
Friendship	United Kingdom	The brig was sunk by ice off Kalana, Russia. Her crew were rescued by the pilot cutter Sandhavn (Sweden). Friendship was on a voyage from Whitby, Yorkshire to Kronstadt, Russia.
Mermaid	United Kingdom	The schooner ran aground on the Maplin Sands, in the North Sea off the coast of Essex. She was refloated with assistance from a tug and taken in to the River Thames.
St. Nicolai	Russia	The ship sank at Taganrog.

== 22 May ==
List of shipwrecks: 22 May 1871
Ship	State	Description
Secret	United Kingdom	The ship was wrecked near Amrum, Germany.
Useful	United Kingdom	The brig was run aground off Saltholm, Denmark. She was on a voyage from Memel, Germany to Boulogne, Pas-de-Calais, France.

== 23 May ==
List of shipwrecks: 23 May 1871
Ship	State	Description
Dankbarkeit	Flag unknown	The ship sank off Osmussaar, Russia. She was on a voyage from Newcastle upon Tyne, Northumberland to Reval, Russia.
Gustave Pastor	Netherlands	The steamship was driven ashore at Dungeness, Kent, United Kingdom. She was on a voyage from Antwerp, Belgium to Havre de Grâce, Seine-Inférieure, France.
Malaga	United Kingdom	The steamship ran aground near the lightship Eendrag (Belgium). She was on a voyage from Middlesbrough, Yorkshire to Antwerp, Belgium.
Minnie	United Kingdom	The ship collided with Elizabeth A. Oliver (United States) and foundered in the Atlantic Ocean off the Isles of Scilly. Her crew were rescued by Ida (United Kingdom). Minnie was on a voyage from London to Boston, Massachusetts, United States.
Saxon	United Kingdom	The ship was destroyed by fire in the Bay of Luce.
White Jacket	United Kingdom	The ship was wrecked on Rodrigues. Her crew were rescued. She was on a voyage from Bombay, India to Hull, Yorkshire.

== 24 May ==
List of shipwrecks: 24 May 1871
Ship	State	Description
Ann Bradshaw	United Kingdom	The ship was driven ashore at Ballywalter, County Down. She was on a voyage from Swansea, Glamorgan to Belfast, County Antrim. She was refloated the next day and taken in to Belfast.
Foam	New Zealand	The 40-ton ketch was driven onto Farewell Spit, New Zealand, in a sou'westerly gale and was wrecked.
Minerva	United Kingdom	The steamship was driven ashore 2 nautical miles (3.7 km) south of Portpatrick, Wigtownshire. She was on a voyage from Dunkirk, Nord, France to Glasgow, Renfrewshire. She was refloated on 7 June and towed in to Portpatrick.
Probus	Germany	The schooner sprang a leak and was abandoned in the Atlantic Ocean. Her six crew took to a boat; they were rescued by the brig Julie (United States). Probus was on a voyage from Puerto Rico to Falmouth, Cornwall or Queenstown, County Cork, United Kingdom.
St. Nicolai	Russia	The ship sank at Taganrog.
Unnamed	Flag unknown	The brig was struck by lightning and foundered off Gonaïves, Haiti.

== 25 May ==
List of shipwrecks: 25 May 1871
Ship	State	Description
Alix	United Kingdom	The ship ran aground on the English Bank, in the River Plate. SHe was on a voyage from Montevideo, Uruguay to the Rio Grande. She was refloated and put back to Montevideo.
Isabella	United Kingdom	The barque was sunk by ice off the Packerort Lighthouse, Russia. She was on a voyage from Newcastle upon Tyne, Northumberland to Kronstadt, Russia.
Isabella	United Kingdom	The ship was destroyed by fire in the Atlantic Ocean, according to a message in a bottle that was discovered on Cape Clear Island, County Cork on 9 September. She was on a voyage from Boston, Massachusetts, United States to Liverpool, Lancashire.

== 26 May ==
List of shipwrecks: 26 May 1871
Ship	State	Description
Auckland	New Zealand	The steamship was wrecked at the mouth of the Snowy River, Victoria. She was on a voyage from Melbourne, Victoria to Sydney, New South Wales.
Fides	Austria-Hungary	The ship was driven ashore 6 nautical miles (11 km) west of Marbella, Spain. She was on a voyage from Sulina, Ottoman Empire to Falmouth, Cornwall, United Kingdom.

== 27 May ==
List of shipwrecks: 27 May 1871
Ship	State	Description
Aunt Sally	United Kingdom	The brigantine ran aground on the Whitby Rocks. She was on a voyage from Ramsgate, Kent to Sunderland, County Durham. She was later refloated and put back to Ramsgate.
Gambia	United Kingdom	The steamship was wrecked in Algoa Bay.
Gannet	United Kingdom	The steamship was wrecked at Gurnard's Head, Cornwall. All on board were rescued. She was on a voyage from Liverpool, Lancashire to Antwerp, Belgium. She broke in three in mid-June.
Norseman	United Kingdom	The steamship was wrecked at Algoa Bay.
Souvenance	France	The full-rigged ship was wrecked near Bredasdorp, Cape Colony with the loss of more than 450 coolies. She was on a voyage from the Antilles to Pondicherry, India.
Suomi	Flag unknown	The ship was driven ashore at Holmpton, Yorkshire, United Kingdom. She was on a voyage from Alexandria, Egypt to Hull, Yorkshire. She had become a wreck by 8 June.
Tairoa	New Zealand	The 51-ton paddle steamer became unresponsive while crossing the bar at Port Molyneux, at the mouth of the Clutha River and became a total loss.
Two unnamed vessels	Russia	The barques sank at Arkhangelsk.

== 28 May ==
List of shipwrecks: 28 May 1871
Ship	State	Description
Julia	New Zealand	The 15-ton schooner was wrecked at Takatu Point in the Hauraki Gulf with the loss of one life.
Scotia	United Kingdom	The ship ran aground at Cartagena, Spain. She was on a voyage from Sunderland, County Durham to Cartagena. She was refloated.
Souákin	(Ottoman Empire) Egypt	The steamship was run down and sunk in the Strait of Gubal by the steamship Africa (United Kingdom). All on board, more than 90 people, were rescued by Africa and another steamship.
Triumph	United Kingdom	The dandy rigged fishing smack was wrecked on the Haisborough Sands, in the North Sea off the coast of Norfolk. Her crew took to a boat; they were rescued by a brig. She was on a voyage from Hull, Yorkshire to London.

== 30 May ==
List of shipwrecks: 30 May 1871
Ship	State	Description
Starling	United Kingdom	The ship ran aground on Skallingen, Denmark. She was on a voyage from Antwerp, Belgium to Königsberg, Germany.

== 31 May ==
List of shipwrecks: 31 May 1871
Ship	State	Description
Assunta Gianello	Italy	The barque was destroyed by fire near Almería, Spain with the loss of a crew member. She was on a voyage from Oran, Algeria to Cardiff, Glamorgan, United Kingdom.
Rhea	Germany	The barque collided with the steamship Hansa (Germany and sank off Sandy Hook, New Jersey, United States with the loss of eight of her fifteen crew. Survivors were rescued by Hansa. Rhea was on a voyage from Rotterdam, South Holland, Netherlands to New York, United States.
Two unnamed vessels	Flags unknown	The schooners ran aground on the West Hoyle Bank, in Liverpool Bay.

== Unknown date ==
List of shipwrecks: Unknown date in May 1871
Ship	State	Description
Adele Regina	France	The fishing lugger collided with an American barque and sank in the English Channel 12 nautical miles (22 km) off Dieppe, Seine-Inférieure with the loss of twelve of her eighteen crew.
A. F. Larrabee	United States	The ship foundered. She was on a voyage from New Orleans, Louisiana to Frontera, Mexico.
Albert	Flag unknown	The schooner was wrecked on Östergarnsholm, Sweden. Her crew were rescued. She was on a voyage from Stettin, Germany to Saint Petersburg, Russia.
Alfred	Norway	The brig ran aground near Reval, Russia. She was on a voyage from Newcastle upon Tyne, Northumberland, United Kingdom to Helsinki, Grand Duchy of Finland. Alfred was refloated in mid-June and completed her voyage.
Angele Victoria	France	The ship was wrecked between Berck and Boulogne, Pas-de-Calais, France. Her crew were rescued.
Anna	Russia	The barque was driven ashore in the Daugava.
Atlantic	Germany	The ship was wrecked near "Languillo". She was on a voyage from Port-au-Prince, Haiti to Hamburg.
Auguste	Germany	The ship was driven ashore at Terranova. She was consequently condemned.
Baroda	United Kingdom	The ship ran aground on the Muckraputty Lumps, in the Hooghly River. She was on a voyage from Liverpool, Lancashire to Calcutta, India. She was refloated and completed her voyage.
Berendina	Netherlands	The ship collided with the steamship Danube (United Kingdom) and was abandoned by her crew, who were rescued by Danube. Berendina was on a voyage from Livorno, Italy to Antwerp, Belgium. Danube towed her in to Lisbon, Portugal in a sinking condition.
Breadalbane	United Kingdom	The steamship was wrecked on the Hassa-el-Thamid Reef, near Jeddah, Jeddah Eyalet before 15 May. She was on a voyage from Liverpool to Bombay, India.
Burgess	Canada	The sailing barge sprang a leak and was beached. She was on a voyage from Kingston, Ontario to Montreal, Quebec.
Cadrio	India	The ship foundered off "Khetty" between 13 and 15 May with the loss of more than 80 lives. There were four or five survivors. She was on a voyage from Kurrachee to "Kotasair".
Candace	United Kingdom	The ship was driven ashore by ice between "Richmond Bay" and New London, Prince Edward Island, Canada. She was on a voyage from Liverpool to Cascumpec, Prince Edward Island.
Charles	United Kingdom	The ship was driven ashore on "Richelieu Island". She was on a voyage from Montreal to the Newfoundland Colony.
Chimborino	United Kingdom	The barque was driven ashore in the Danube downstream of Sulina, Ottoman Empire.
Chusan	United Kingdom	The ship was wrecked on the coast of Korea. She was on a voyage from Yantai, China to "Passeitor Port". The wreck was burnt on the orders of the Korean government.
Corinna	Italy	The schooner foundered off San Pietro Island, Sardinia. She was on a voyage from Alexandria, Egypt to an English port.
Cormorant	United Kingdom	The barque ran aground in the Bonny River. She was refloated and beached.
Dayspring	United Kingdom	The ship foundered at Monte Rosa, São Tomé Island. She was on a voyage from Newcastle upon Tyne to Melbourne, Victoria.
Deerfoot	United Kingdom	The ship was driven ashore near Southend-on-Sea, Essex. She was on a voyage from South Shields, County Durham to London. She was refloated.
Delta	United States	The ship ran aground on the Trijon Shoals. She was on a voyage from Boston, Massachusetts to Richibucto, New Brunswick, Canada.
Dromedary	United Kingdom	The steamship was driven ashore in the Daugava.
Elise	France	The brig foundered off the Norwegian coast. Her crew survived. She was on a voyage from Hartlepool, County Durham to Riga, Russia.
Eliza	United Kingdom	The ship collided with the Newarp Lightship ( Trinity House) and sank. Her crew were rescued.
Eliza and Alice	United Kingdom	The barque struck a rock at Cape St. Francis, Cape Colony and sank. Her crew were rescued. She was on a voyage from Sundsvall, Sweden to Port Elizabeth, Cape Colony.
Eliza Hunter	United Kingdom	The ship foundered in the Atlantic Ocean. She was on a voyage from Charleston, South Carolina, United States to London.
Emily McNear	United Kingdom	The ship was wrecked on Keeling Island. Her crew were rescued. She was on a voyage from Cardiff, Glamorgan to Hong Kong.
Eugenie	United Kingdom	The ship was driven ashore at Champlain, Quebec. She was on a voyage from "Purtow" to Montreal.
Eurichetta	United Kingdom	The ship capsized at Darien, Georgia, United States.
Express	(Canada)	The ship was destroyed by fire. She was on a voyage from Halifax to Guysborough, Nova Scotia.
Forganhall	United Kingdom	The ship was driven ashore at Bic, Quebec. She was on a voyage from Quebec City to Greenock, Renfrewshire. She was refloated and put back to Quebec City in a waterlogged condition.
Frederick	Norway	The ship was abandoned in the North Sea before 9 May. She was towed in to Aberdeen, United Kingdom on that date.
Glory of the Seas	United Kingdom	The clipper ran aground on the Round Reef. She was on a voyage from Saint John, New Brunswick to Liverpool. She was refloated and resumed her voyage.
Harvest Maid	United States	The ship was wrecked in the Saint Lawrence River. She was on a voyage from Baltimore, Maryland to Paspébiac, Quebec.
Harvest Queen	United Kingdom	The ship was beached.
Haselunne	Germany	The brig was abandoned in the North Sea. Her crew were rescued by Carl Johann (Denmark). Haselunne was on a voyage from London to Königsberg.
Hellechina Reina	Flag unknown	The ship was holed by ice and sank off "Wulff". Her crew were rescued. She was on a voyage from Newcastle upon Tyne to Saint Petersburg.
Hoop	Belgium	The ship was wrecked. She was on a voyage from Ghent, East Flanders to Saint Petersburg.
Houghton	United Kingdom	The steamship was driven ashore and wrecked on Öland, Sweden. Her crew were rescued. She was on a voyage from Riga to Dunkirk, Nord, France.
Iberian	United Kingdom	The steamship ran aground at Constantinople, Ottoman Empire. She was refloated.
Lammegina	Netherlands	The ship sank of Keri, Russia. She was on a voyage from Livorno to Saint Petersburg.
Maggie	United States	The ship was driven ashore in Orange Bay.
Margaret Tod	United Kingdom	The steamship ran aground on Naissaar, Russia. She was on a voyage from Reval to Leith. She was refloated and put back to Reval in a waterlogged condition. The leak was stopped and she sailed in early June for Riga, Russia for repairs.
Maria Busch	United Kingdom	The ship was driven ashore and wrecked at Shelburne, Nova Scotia, Canada. She was on a voyage from Glasgow, Renfrewshire to Halifax.
Mary Bentley	United Kingdom	The ship foundered in the Atlantic Ocean. She was on a voyage from Caibarién, Cuba to New York.
Michelino	Italy	The ship ran aground in the Sea of Marmara. She was on a voyage from Newcastle upon Tyne to Batoum, Ottoman Empire. She was refloated and taken in to Constantinople.
Mima	United Kingdom	The ship ran aground at Inverness. She was on a voyage from Invermoriston, Inverness-shire to Middlesbrough, Yorkshire. She was refloated and resumed her voyage.
Mondego	Portugal	The steamship caught fire at Havre de Grâce, Seine-Inférieure, France.
Napoli	Italy	The steamship ran aground near Palermo, Sicily. She was refloated and put in to Palermo.
Nellie Staples	United States	The ship was abandoned at sea.
Nordlyset	Flag unknown	The ship was wrecked on the Caicos Bank. She was on a voyage from Newport, Monmouthshire to Havana, Cuba.
Omega	United States	The ship was wrecked on the Brigantine Shoals. She was on a voyage from Sagua La Grande, Cuba to New York.
Pactolus	United Kingdom	The ship was driven ashore and wrecked at Larne, County Antrim. Her crew were rescued.
Puchoco	Chile	The ship foundered. She was on a voyage from Valparaíso to Coronel.
Queen	United Kingdom	The steamship ran aground at Plymouth, Devon. She was refloated.
Queen of the Belgians	United Kingdom	The ship was run ashore on Nevis before 27 May. She was refloated.
Red Jacket	United Kingdom	The ship ran aground at the Cantick Head, Orkney Islands. She was on a voyage from Calcutta, India to Dundee, Forfarshire. She was refloated and resumed her voyage.
Remembrance	United Kingdom	The ship ran aground on the Mowiss Reef, in the Baltic Sea. She was on a voyage from Gävle, Sweden to Hartlepool. She was refloated and towed in to Varberg, Sweden in a leaky condition .
Sir Robert McClure	United Kingdom	The ship ran aground. She was on a voyage from Charleston to Plymouth. She was refloated and put back to Charleston.
Starling	United Kingdom	The ship ran aground on the Horns Reef, in the North Sea before 30 May. She was on a voyage from Antwerp to Königsberg. She was refloated and resumed her voyage.
Thetis	United Kingdom	The ship ran aground off Pakefield, Suffolk. She was on a voyage from Wells-next-the-Sea, Norfolk to Antwerp. She was refloated and taken in to Harwich, Essex in a leaky condition.
Thornhill	United Kingdom	The ship was driven ashore on "Barque Island". She was on a voyage from Quebec City to Glasson Dock, Lancashire. She was later refloated and resumed her voyage.
Tribsees	United Kingdom	The ship was driven ashore in the Dardanelles. She was on a voyage from Cardiff to Constantinople. She was refloated.
Tropic Bird	United States	The ship was wrecked on the Colorado Reef, off the coast of Cuba. She was on a voyage from Cuba to Boston.
Victoria	United States	The ship was driven ashore at "Peapath". She was on a voyage from Philadelphia, Pennsylvania to Constantinople.
