= South Channel =

United States shipping channel

Coordinates: 42°20′45″N 70°55′00″W

South Channel or Broad Sound South Entrance Channel is one of three shipping channels in the United States connecting Boston Harbor to Massachusetts Bay near Boston, Massachusetts. Starting at the eastern end of the President Roads anchorage, the channel passes north of Lovell's Island and Ram’s Head Flats, then northwest of Aldridge Ledge and the Devils Back. It is dredged to a 30-foot (9.1 m) depth.

== See also ==
- Broad Sound North Entrance Channel
