= Southport shipwrecks =

Over the years, a number of ships have foundered off Southport. For the purposes of this article, the Southport area shall be considered as Southwards from Lytham St Annes to Freshfield.

== Star of Hope - 1883 ==
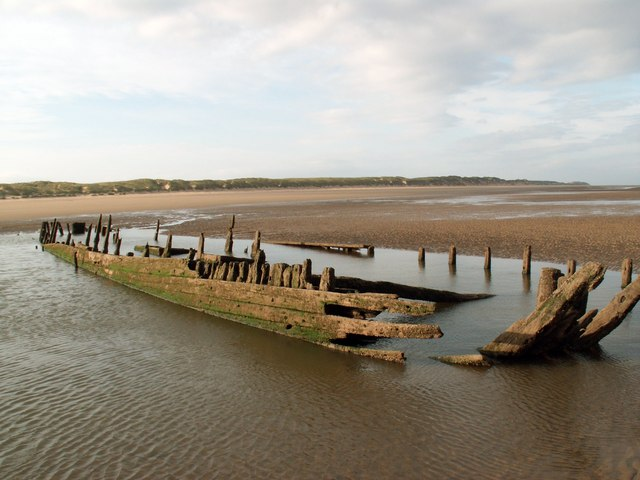
The remains of Star of Hope in 2006

The German barque Star of Hope was on a voyage from Wilmington, North Carolina to Liverpool, carrying a cargo of cotton. It was caught in a Force 10 gale in the Mersey approaches. The ship was reported to be in distress and it was later reported that her nine crew were safe on the Crosby lightship.

== Mexico - 1886 ==
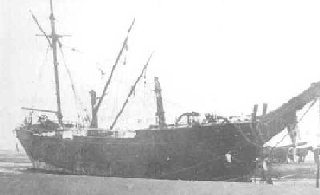
Mexico beached off Birkdale

The German barque Mexico ran aground near Taggs-Island off Birkdale on 9 December 1886. The crew of twelve were saved by the Lytham lifeboat Charles Biggs, but the Southport and St. Annes lifeboats both capsized, with 27 of the 29 crew being killed. The Mexico came ashore off Birkdale, opposite the Birkdale Palace Hotel.

== Zealandia - 1917 ==
An American sail-steamer of 2,372 GRT, SS Zealandia was on a voyage from New York to Liverpool with a cargo of mugs, sheep and treacle when she ran aground on the Horsebank on 2 April 1917.

== Chrysopolis - 1918 ==
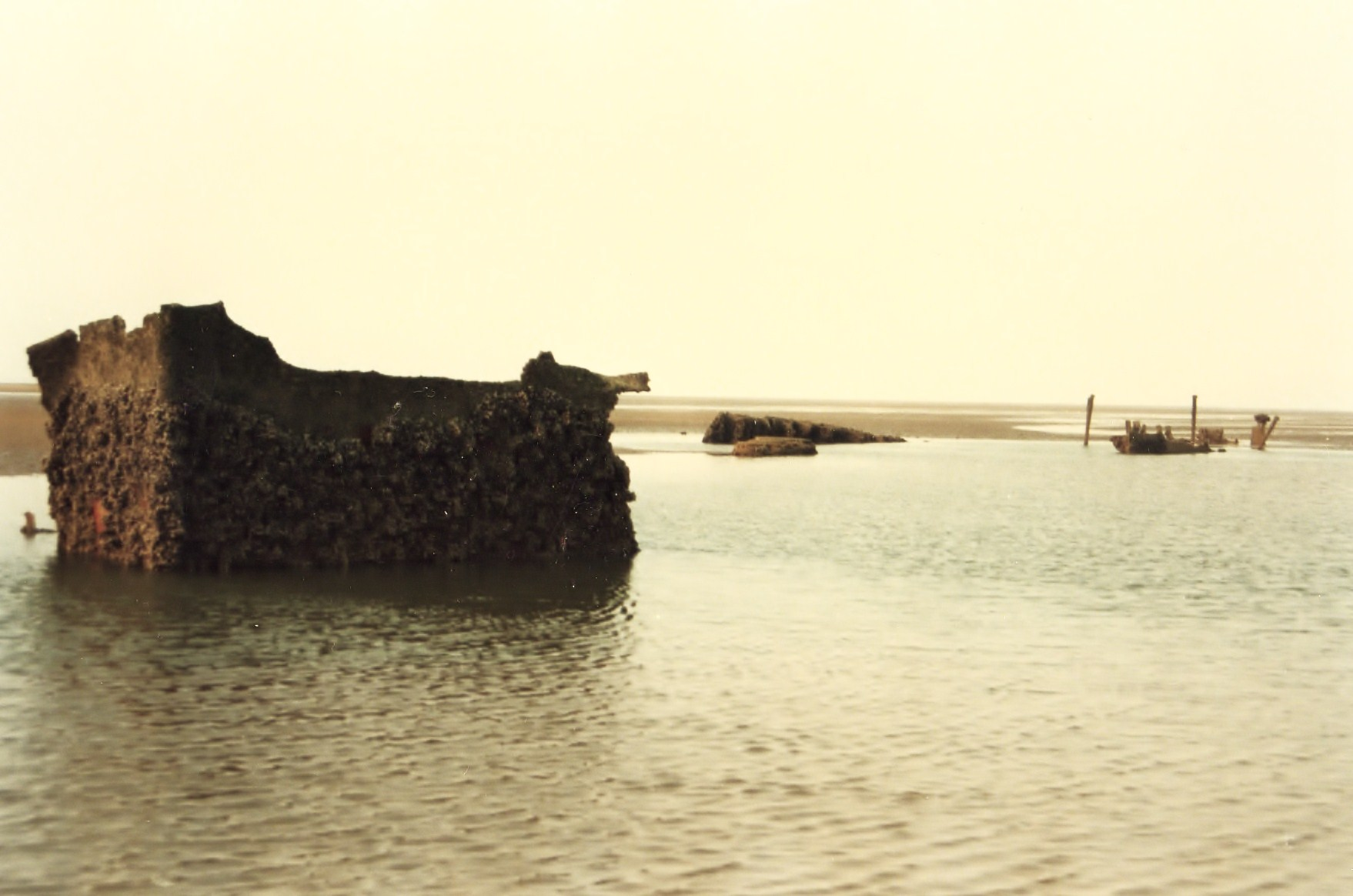
Wreck of SS Chrysopolis at low water. 2.5 miles off Southport,1998.

The SS Chrysopolis ran aground on the Spencers Bank in fog on 14 February 1918. She was on a voyage from Genoa to Liverpool with a cargo of copper ore. During attempts to refloat her using two tugs, her back was broken and she became a total loss. A gale sprang up, resulting in her 38 crew and a further four salvors being rescued by the Southport lifeboat.

== Endymion - 1933 ==
The steam trawler Endymion was being towed from Fleetwood to Preston when she broke free of her tow and grounded on the Horsebank on 31 July 1933. Salvage attempts failed and she was used for target practice during the Second World War.

== Ionic Star - 1939 ==
The Blue Star Line's refrigerated cargo ship SS Ionic Star of 5,594 GRT, was inbound to Liverpool from Rio de Janeiro and Santos with a cargo of cotton, fruit and meat. On 16 October 1939, she ran aground on Mad Wharf, about a mile west of Formby Point. Although her cargo was salvaged, the ship was declared a total loss. A contract was let for her salvage, but the position of the ship made this too difficult to achieve and she was later used for target practice during the Second World War.

== Charles Livingston - 1939 ==
The 434 GRT Liverpool Pilot SS Charles Livingston came ashore at Ainsdale on 25 November 1939 in a gale. Lifeboats from Lytham and Blackpool were launched, with the Blackpool lifeboat Sarah Ann Austin rescuing six crew., Four others reached the shore. A further 23 crew were killed. The vessel had misreported her position as between the Bar lightship and Great Orme Head, leading to lifeboats from Hoylake, New Brighton and Rhyl being launched. Two silver and two bronze medals were awarded by the RNLI for this rescue.

== Pegu - 1939 ==
The 8,183 GRT Henderson Line liner SS Pegu ran aground in the Crosby Channel on 24 November 1939 due to buoy lights being extinguished as a wartime measure. The New Brighton lifeboat rescued her 103 crew but it proved impossible to refloat Pegu.

== Happy Harry - 1950 ==
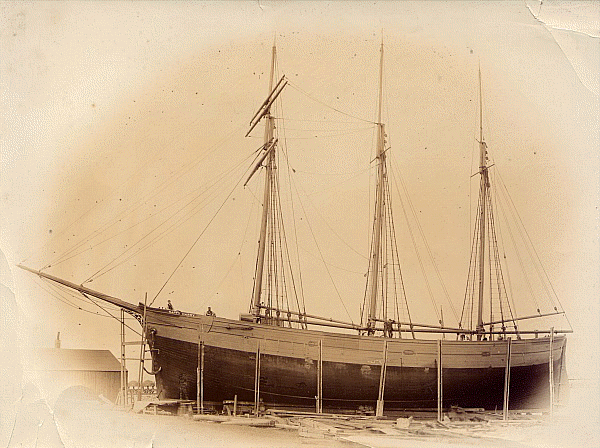
'Happy Harry before her launch

The schooner Happy Harry was wrecked on 15 September 1950 against Southport Pier. She had grounded on Taylor's Bank and her crew were rescued by lifeboat. Happy Harry was refloated and sailed to Southport where she was anchored, but she later dragged her anchor and crashed into the pier. Southport Corporation wanted the ship removed, and she was dragged away from the pier and burnt.

== See also ==
- Blackpool shipwrecks
