= Devils Back =

Rock in Suffolk County, Massachusetts, United States

Coordinates: 42.351699°N 70.906389°W

Devils Back in Massachusetts, USA, is a very small and barren rock in Massachusetts Bay located within the city limits of Boston. The rock is northeast of Aldridge Ledge, southwest of Commissioners Ledge, northwest of Half Tide Rocks, west of Green Island, and just east of the South Channel.
