= Blackpool shipwrecks =

Ship graveyard in England

Blackpool and the Fylde coast have become a ship graveyard for a number of vessels over the years. Most of the shipwrecks occurred at or near Blackpool, whilst a few happened a little further afield but have strong connections with the Blackpool area. For this article, Blackpool means the stretch of coast from Fleetwood to Lytham St Annes.

== Travers – 1755 ==
Travers was wrecked in 1755 with a cargo of lace.

== The "Pea Soup" wreck – 1779 ==
In the autumn of 1779 a ship laden with peas was wrecked at Blackpool.

== Happy – 1797 ==
In December 1797, Happy foundered off Lytham St. Annes. She was on a voyage from Porto, Portugal to Liverpool, Lancashire.

== Fanny – 1821 ==
Fanny was wrecked off the coast of Blackpool in 1821, laden with red and black flannel.

== Wreck at the Gynn – 1833 ==
A ship was wrecked at the Gynn in 1833.

== Crusader – 1839 ==
Crusader was wrecked at South Shore in 1839, laden with silk. Some looters from Marton were jailed after being caught stealing the cargo.

== Aristocrat – 1840 ==
The brig Aristocrat was wrecked opposite the Imperial Hydro in 1840. Two of the passengers drowned.

== William Henry – 1861 ==
The schooner William Henry was wrecked at South Shore, laden with flour and lard.

== St Michael – 1864 ==
St Michael was wrecked at Blackpool on 18 September 1864. The new lifeboat rescued the crew of fourteen.

== Favourite – 1865 ==
The brig Favourite, of Liverpool was wrecked off Blackpool on 22 November 1865 with the loss of ten crew. She was carrying a cargo of palm oil and seed.

== Lexington – 1865 ==
The barque Lexington was wrecked, and the crew of fourteen were saved by the lifeboat.

== Bessie Jones – 1880 ==
The Fleetwood schooner Bessie Jones was lost on Salthouse Bank on 26 February 1880. One man was lost, but four were saved. It was this shipwreck that led to a campaign for a lifeboat at St. Annes. She was refloated in July 1880.

== Arethusa – 1882 ==
Arethusa was wrecked off Blackpool in 1882, ten people were saved.

== Sirene – 1892 ==
The Norwegian ship Sirene was sailing from Fleetwood to Florida in the United States on 9 October 1892 when it was caught up in a hurricane and smashed into North Pier, destroying part of the pier. The eleven crew members jumped onto the pier to safety. The ship's wheel is housed in Blackpool lifeboat house. The anchor from the ship was donated to the Borough of Middleton and can be seen resting against the library wall in Long Street. Mr Hulbert, a local iron and coal merchant, had the contract to dismantle the wreck.

== SS Huntcliff – 1894 ==
The tramp steamer SS Huntcliff had been anchored off Llandudno on 12 February 1894 when the anchor chain snapped. She was beached between Squires Gate and St. Annes, being refloated 11 days later. The beach became a temporary fairground.

== Abana – 1894 ==
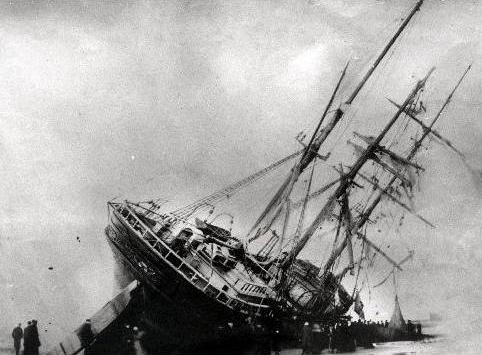
Abana

On 22 December 1894, the Norwegian ship, Abana was sailing from Liverpool to Florida but was caught up in a storm and mistook the then recently built Blackpool Tower for a lighthouse. Abana was first seen off North Pier but by the time the lifeboat, which had to be towed by horse from Blackpool to Bispham, had been launched it had drifted to Little Bispham where it was wrecked. The ship's bell still hangs in St Andrews Church in Cleveleys. The remains of the Abana are still visible at low tide on the beach at Little Bispham. On the same day as Abana hit the pier, a fishing boat from Fleetwood, Petrel, was also driven ashore by the same storm close to Uncle Tom's Cabin at North Shore.

== HMS Foudroyant – 1897 ==
HMS Foudroyant

HMS Foudroyant, which had been used by Nelson as his flagship from 6 June 1799 until the end of June 1801, was wrecked on 16 June 1897, during a fund-raising voyage around the coast of Great Britain. Foudroyant came to Blackpool from Southport on 4 June and anchored two miles out to sea between Central and North piers. Just before 6am on 16 June the ship was caught up in a hurricane-force storm and broke anchor. She drifted toward land, and just missed the jetty at North pier before hitting the shore slightly to the north at Cocker Square. The ship was then bought by a local syndicate who made souvenirs from the wood. Most of the ship though was broken up in a storm in November 1897.

== Commandant Bultinck – 1929 ==
Formerly a Fleetwood trawler, Commandant Bultinck was wrecked on Rossall Beach on 3 December 1929. Three people were killed.

== MV Thorium – 1964 ==
Thorium was an ICI coaster that ran aground on Knot Spit in 1964. She was refloated six days later.

== Holland XXIV – 1981 ==
Holland XXIV was a dredger that ended up beached at Cleveleys in 1981.

== MS Riverdance – 2008 ==
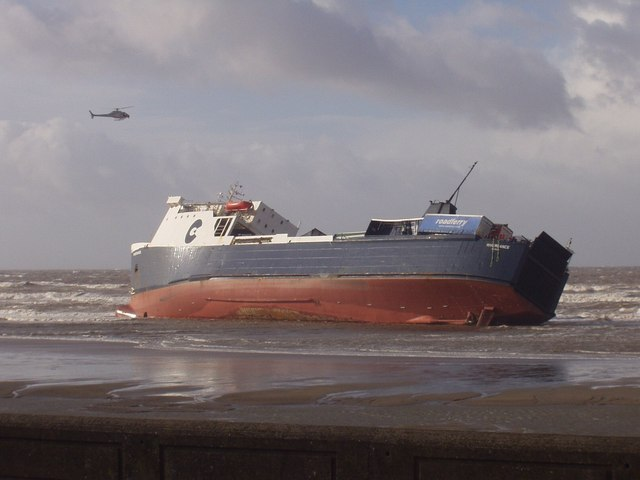
MS Riverdance

On 31 January 2008, Riverdance a roll-on/roll-off ferry in service on the Irish Sea, was travelling from Warrenpoint in Northern Ireland to Heysham when it ran into trouble at about 19:30. A total of twenty-three people were airlifted from the ferry, which ran aground on the beach at Anchorsholme, Blackpool, opposite Anchorsholme Lane West at about 22:50. The ship was beached very close to the remains of Abana. On 1 February a 400-metre exclusion zone was placed around the stricken ferry and it was revealed that the ferry could be stranded on the beach for some time before salvage teams could remove her. The ship suffered further structural damage during storms on 12 March, and it was announced on 10 April that all attempts to refloat her had been abandoned and that she was to be scrapped on site.

== Coco Leoni – 2008 ==
On 27 March 2008 the motor cruiser Coco Leoni ran aground opposite Lytham windmill. The boat was refloated a week later.

== See also ==
- Southport shipwrecks
