= Dart (ship) =

Several vessels have borne the name Dart, for the dart or the River Dart:

- Dart (1787 ship) was launched at Plymouth in 1787. Dart initially traded with Newfoundland and then the Mediterranean. From 1797 she made four voyages as a slave ship in the triangular trade in enslaved people. She was condemned at Barbados in 1802 as she was returning to London after having delivered slaves to Demerara.
- Dart (1794 ship) was launched at Rotherhithe and made two voyages as a packet boat for the British East India Company; she then disappears from readily accessible online records.
- Dart (1799 ship) was launched at Dartmouth in 1799. Between 1800 and 1804 she made two complete voyages from Liverpool as a slave ship. She wrecked in 1804 early in the outward bound leg of her third slave voyage.
- Dart (1801 ship) was launched at Ostend in 1792, came into British hands in 1801, and became a sealer and whaler in the South Seas fisheries. She was last listed in 1810.
- Dart (1806 ship) was launched in South America in 1797, taken in prize in 1806, made one whaling voyage and one voyage as a privateer capturing five slave vessels off Sierra Leone in 1810, before returning to mercantile trade. She was condemned as unseaworthy in 1813.
- Dart (1818 ship) was a merchant ship built at Sunderland, England in 1818. She made three voyages transporting convicts from Mauritius to Australia.
- Dart (steamboat) operated in the early 1900s as part of the Puget Sound Mosquito Fleet.
- The Dart Line ferry operator had several vessels named Dart: MS Dart 1; MS Dart 2; MS Dart 3, a ferry, launched 1985, now known as MS Phocine; MS Dart 4; MS Dart 5; MS Dart 6, 1998, now known as MS Arrow; MS Dart 7, 1998, now known as MS Clipper Ranger; MS Dart 8; MS Dart 9
- The Dart Container Line operated MV Dart America, MV Dart Atlantic, and MV Dart Europe

== Naval vessels ==
- HMS Dart
- USS Dart

== See also ==
- Dart (disambiguation)
- Dart 15, Dart 16 and Dart 18, sailing catamarans
