= Dart Line =

British ferry operator

Dart Line was a British ferry operator operating from the River Thames near Dartford.

The company had several vessels named Dart:

- MS Dart 1, operated 1997–2002
- MS Dart 2, operated 1996–2005
- MS Dart 3, launched 1985, used on the Dartford–Vlissingen, Dartford–Zeebrugge and Dartford–Dunkirk routes 1997–2006
- MS Dart 4, operated 1997–2006
- MS Dart 5, operated 1996–1999
- MS Dart 6, launched 1998, used on the Dartford–Vlissingen line and Dartford–Dunkirk in 1998–1999 and 2003
- MS Dart 7, launched 1998, operated on the Dartford–Vlissingen line in 1999
- MS Dart 8, operated 1999–2006
- MS Dart 9, operated 1999–2006

They also operated other ships:

- MS Northern Star, launched 1991, operated Dartford–Vlissingen in 2003

Dart Line was owned by Jacobs Holdings, who in 2000 announced a move of the freight and ferry services at Thames Europort, Dartford, to Shell Haven in Essex. In 2006 the parent company Bidvest sold Dart Line to Cobelfret.

== See also ==
- Dart (ship)
