= MS Helliar =

Ferry built in 1997

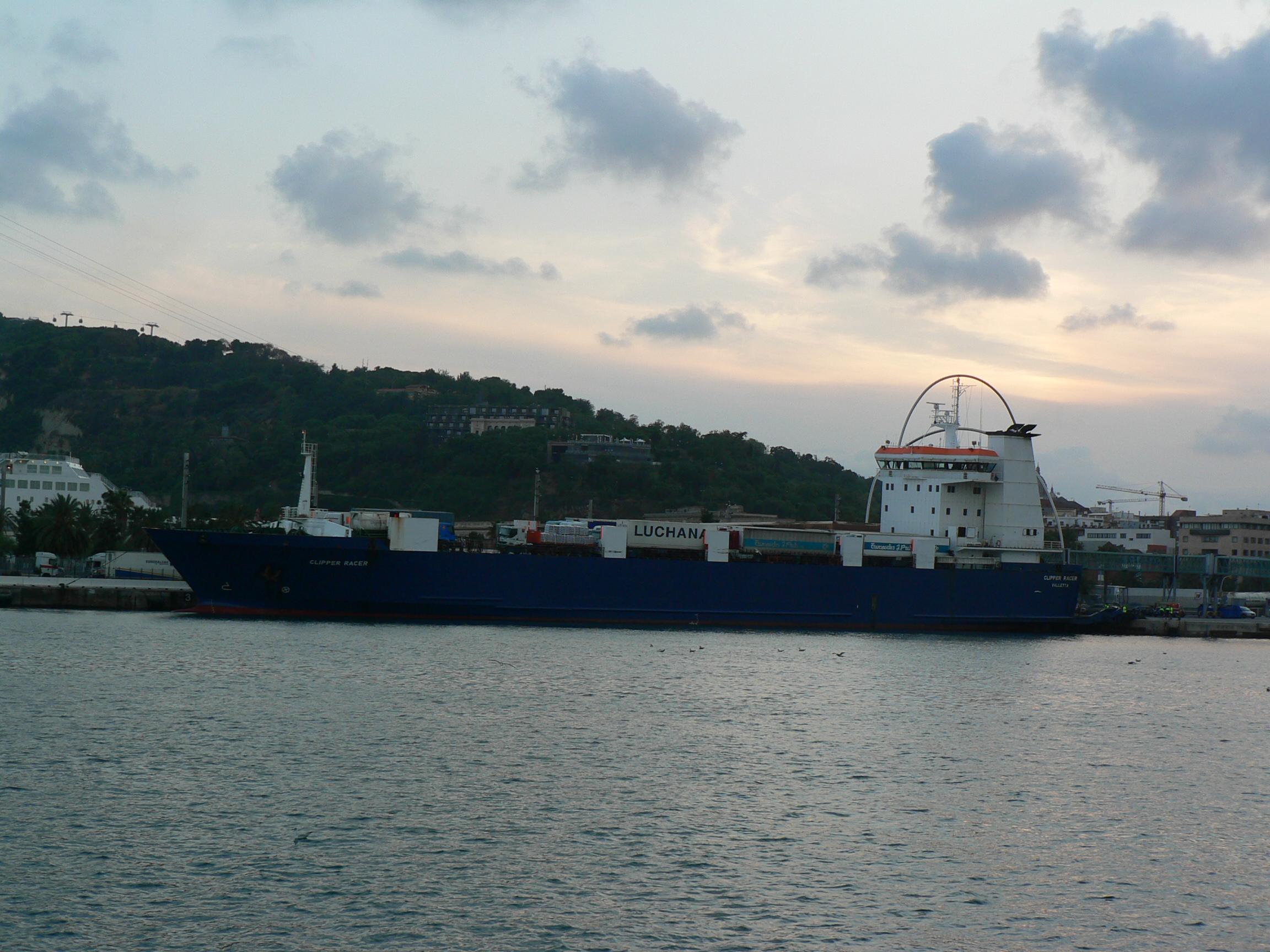
- In the Port of Barcelona as Clipper Racer in 2009

History
- Name: Lehola (1997–2005); RR Triumph (2005–07); Triumph (2007–08); Clipper Racer (2008-11); Helliar (2011-)
- Owner: Estonian Shipping Company (1997–2005); Elmira Shipping & Trading (2005–07); Clipper Group (2007-19); Caledonian Maritime Assets (2019-)
- Operator: Estonian Shipping Company (1997–98); Czar Peter Line (1998–99); Delom (1999–2000); Estonian Shipping Company (2000–02); Scandlines (2002–04); P&O Ferries (2005–06); P&O Irish Sea (2006–07); Baleària (2007–08); Condor Ferries (2008); Isle of Man Steam Packet Company (2008); Baleària (2008); Seatruck Ferries (2008-10); SNAV (2010); NorthLink Ferries (2011-)
- Port of registry: (Isle of Man) Douglas
- Route: Aberdeen - Kirkwall - Lerwick
- Ordered: 30 September 1994
- Builder: Astilleros de Sevilla, Huelva
- Yard number: 569
- Laid down: 20 October 1995
- Launched: 13 November 1996
- Completed: 15 October 1997
- Identification: Call sign: 2EPP5; IMO number: 9119397; MMSI number: 235087119; Det Norske Veritas number 19013
- Status: In service

General characteristics
- Class & type: Roll-on/roll-off ferry
- Tonnage: Gross tonnage 7,606; Deadweight tonnage 5,758; Net tonnage 2,282
- Length: 122.32 m (401 ft 4 in) ovwerall, 112.20 m (368 ft 1 in) between perpendiculars
- Beam: 19.80 m (65 ft 0 in)
- Draught: 6.21 m (20 ft 4 in)
- Ice class: Class 1A
- Installed power: 2 x Wärtsilä 9R32 diesel engines, 3,700 kilowatts (5,000 hp) each
- Speed: 17 knots (31 km/h)
- Capacity: 1,055 m (1,154 yd) lanes, 63 trailers or 266 TEU

Helliar is a ferry owned by Caledonian Maritime Assets and operated by NorthLink Ferries. Built by Astilleros de Huelva in Spain in 1997 as Lehola for the Estonian Shipping Company she has served a number of owners and operators as RR Triumph and Triumph before her sale to Clipper Group and being renamed Clipper Racer. In 2011, she was chartered to NorthLink Ferries and renamed Helliar.

== History ==
Lehola was built by Astilleros de Huelva, Huelva Spain as yard number 569. She was ordered on 30 September 1994 and her keel was laid on 20 October 1995. Lehola was launched on 13 November 1996 and completed on 15 October 1997.

She was originally registered with Nippon Kaiji Kyokai, being transferred to Det Norske Veritas on 27 November 2007.

=== Owners ===
From 1997 to 2005, Lehola was owned by the Estonian Shipping Company. In 2005, she was sold to Elmira Shipping & Trading and renamed RR Triumph. In 2007, she was sold to the Clipper Group and renamed Triumph, being renamed Clipper Racer in 2008. In 2011, she was chartered to NorthLink Ferries and renamed Helliar at a ceremony in Kirkwall, Orkney Islands. In 2019 she was purchased by Caledonian Maritime Assets.

=== Service history ===
In late 1997, Lehola entered service with the Estonian Shipping Company on the Tallinn – Helsinki – Copenhagen – Arhus route. In August 1998 she was chartered to Czar Peter Line and put into service on the Moerdijk – Kronstadt route. In February 1999 she was chartered to Delom and put into service on the Marseille – Tunis – Sète route. In October 2000, she was returned to Estonia Shipping Company and put into service on the Kiel – Tallinn route until 31 December 2004.

In January 2005, she was chartered to P&O Ferries and entered service on the Zeebrugge – Hull and Rotterdam – Hull routes. On 11 July 2005, Lehola was sold to Elmira Shipping, Piraeus, Greece. She was renamed RR Triumph and reflagged to Malta, her homeport changing from Tallinn to Valletta.

She was then chartered to P&O Ferries and then P&O Irish Sea. In July 2005 she was put into service on the Liverpool – Dublin route. Her charter to P&O Irish Sea ended on 11 February 2007 and she was chartered to Baleària, Spain later that month. On 30 October 2007, RR Triumph was sold to Seatruck Ferries, remaining under the Maltese flag. In December 2007 she was renamed Triumph. From 1 February to 23 March 2008 she was chartered to Condor Ferries and put into service between Portsmouth and the Channel Islands. In April 2008 she was chartered to the Isle of Man Steam Packet Company and put into service on the Heysham – Douglas route.

On 5 June 2008 she was put into service on Seatruck's Liverpool – Dublin route. on 12 July 2008, she was renamed Clipper Racer. In April 2009 she was chartered to Baleària. In May 2010, she was chartered to Italian ferry operator SNAV and put into service on the Naples - Palermo route. On 5 October, a contract was signed for the chartering of Clipper Racer to NorthLink Ferries. On 5 January 2011, she was renamed Helliar.

In 2012 she was again reflagged - this time to the Isle of Man. In April 2012 Helliar was again chartered to the Isle of Man Steam Packet Company to cover the refit of Ben-my-Chree before returning to NorthLink the following month.

== Description ==
MV Helliar is 122.32 metres (401 ft 4 in) long. She has a beam of 19.80 metres (65 ft 0 in) and a draught of 6.20 metres (20 ft 4 in). She is powered by two Wärtsilä 9R32 diesel engines which propel her at 17 knots (31 km/h). The engines develop 3,700 kilowatts (5,000 hp) each. She has a GT of 7,606, NT of 2,282 and DWT of 5,758. On board there are 1,055 lane metres of trailer space, giving capacity to carry up to 63 trailers.

== Sister vessels ==
- Arrow, built as Varbola.
- Clipper Ranger, built as Lembitu.
- Hildasay, built as Leili.
