= Schulte Group =

German shipowning and ship management group

- Type: Private (GmbH & Co. KG)
- Industry: Shipping, ship management
- Founded: 1883 in Papenburg, Germany (as Schulte & Bruns)
- Founder: Johann Hermann Schulte, Christoph Bruns
- Headquarters: Hamburg, Germany
- Key people: Ian Beveridge (CEO, Schulte Group); Sebastian von Hardenberg (CEO, BSM)
- Number of employees: c. 40,000 seafarers; over 5,000 shore staff (group, self-reported)
- Subsidiaries: Bernhard Schulte Shipmanagement; Bernhard Schulte Offshore
- Website: www.schultegroup.com

The Schulte Group is a family-owned German shipping group based in Hamburg. Its principal companies are the shipowner Bernhard Schulte, which owns or co-owns a fleet of about 80 vessels, and Bernhard Schulte Shipmanagement (BSM), a third-party ship management company that manages roughly 670 ships from some 30 locations worldwide. The group traces its origins to a shipbroking firm formally founded in Papenburg in 1883 and has been controlled by the Schulte family for five generations. BSM's Cypriot predecessor, Hanseatic Shipping which was founded in 1972, is described as one of the first companies to offer ship management to outside owners, and which Schulte acquired in 2008.

== History ==
=== Schulte & Bruns (1883–1955) ===
Johann Hermann Schulte and his friend Christoph Bruns founded Schulte & Bruns in Papenburg in 1883 as a shipbroking and ship agency business. The firm opened an office in Emden in the 1890s. In the year 1900 it acquired twelve sailing vessels for the Baltic timber trade, and in 1912 it bought its first steamship, the Konsul Schulte. By 1939 the fleet numbered 16 vessels of about 90,000 deadweight tons. After the Second World War the surviving steamers were lost to expropriation and scuttling, and the company bought its first post-war ship in 1949.

=== Bernhard Schulte era (1955–2008) ===
In 1955 Konsul Bernhard Schulte (1907–1975), of the family's third generation, left the partnership with four ships and set up his own shipowning company in Hamburg. The company grew quickly during the shipping boom that followed the Suez Crisis, taking delivery of 13 newbuildings between 1957 and 1967. Heinrich Schulte joined the firm in 1963, when it had 14 ships. Under Heinrich in the late 1960s, the company moved into liquefied petroleum gas (LPG) and later liquefied natural gas (LNG) shipping. One of its early gas carriers was the Lissy Schulte, built in 1974 and named in tribute to a cargo ship of the same name and built in 1953.

In 1972 the company took a 25 percent share in Hanseatic Shipping, a new ship management company in Limassol, Cyprus. Hanseatic managed 25 ships by 1976, opened a crew recruitment agency in Manila in 1979, and had grown to about 200 vessels, including crew-managed ships, by 1987. The family had bought out its outside partners in the fleet in 1971, and by 1980 its management companies ran almost 100 vessels from offices in Cyprus, Hong Kong, Bermuda and the Isle of Man. Bernhard Schulte died in 1975.

In 1996 the group bought the long-established Hamburg liner company de:Oldenburg-Portugiesische Dampfschiffs-Rhederei (OPDR). In 2004 it bought its first crude oil tankers and acquired pressurised gas carriers. Ian Beveridge became chief executive in 2001, and Heinrich Schulte moved to the chairmanship.

=== Consolidation and later developments (2008–present) ===
In 2008 the group merged its ship management businesses, including Hanseatic Shipping, Dorchester Atlantic Marine, and the Eurasia Group, into a single company, Bernhard Schulte Shipmanagement. The group moved into a new Hamburg headquarters in the harbor district in 2011. OPDR was sold to the French carrier CMA CGM in 2015, as liner shipping was no longer considered a core business.

In 2014 the company ordered its first large LNG carrier, a 174,000-cubic-meter ship from Samsung that entered service in 2018 as Comet Arrow. In 2016 BSM and Babcock International formed Babcock Schulte Energy, a 50/50 joint venture. It took delivery of the 7,500-cubic-meter Kairos, which Babcock described as the world's largest LNG bunker supply vessel, from Hyundai Mipo Dockyard in October 2018 for service in the Baltic region.

The group entered the offshore wind market in 2015, founding Bernhard Schulte Offshore to operate service vessels for wind farms. Its first two ships of this type, Windea La Cour and Windea Leibniz, were built by Ulstein. A later series of methanol-ready, hybrid-battery commissioning service operation vessels (CSOVs) from Ulstein Verft included Windea Clausius (delivered September 2025) and ended with Windea Clarke in June 2026. That gave the company seven CSOVs. In May 2026 Bernhard Schulte took delivery of Northern Purpose, a 7,500-cubic-meter liquefied CO_{2} carrier with LNG dual-fuel propulsion and a rotor sail. The ship was built by Dalian Shipbuilding Offshore and is on long-term charter to the Northern Lights carbon capture and storage project run by Equinor, Shell and TotalEnergies.

== Incidents ==
BSM was the technical manager of the container ship Ever Given when it ran aground and blocked the Suez Canal in March 2021. The company said that all 25 crew members, all Indian nationals, were safe and that there was no pollution or damage to the cargo.
