= Estonian Shipping Company =

Company based in Tallinn

AS Eesti Merelaevandus
- Type: Subsidiary
- Industry: Shipping
- Founded: 1940
- Defunct: 2019
- Headquarters: Tallinn, Estonia
- Area served: Estonia
- Parent: Tschudi Group
- Website: www.eml.ee

Eesti Merelaevandus or ESCO, also called Estonian Shipping Company was an Estonian shipping company that operated multipurpose dry cargo and container ships. Technical management of the ships is performed by First Baltic Shipmanagement. The company is owned by the Tschudi Group that bought it from the Government of Estonia in 1997. Between 1940 and 1991 the company was part of the Soviet Union Merchant Fleet.

ESCO was also a co-founder, and for a time the sole owner, of Tallink and Estline.

The company was deleted from the business register due to the end of bankruptcy proceedings in 2019.

== Fleet ==
=== Former ships ===
Kalana in the Kiel Canal

- Abruka
- Aleksander Aberg
- Aleksander Kolmpere
- Elmar Kivistik
- Gustav Sule
- Kalana
- Kassari
- Kunda
- Kristjan Palusalu
- Kurkse
- Lehola
- Leili
- Lembitu
- Paul Keres
- Rakvere
- Transestonia
- Varbola
