= MV Muirneag =

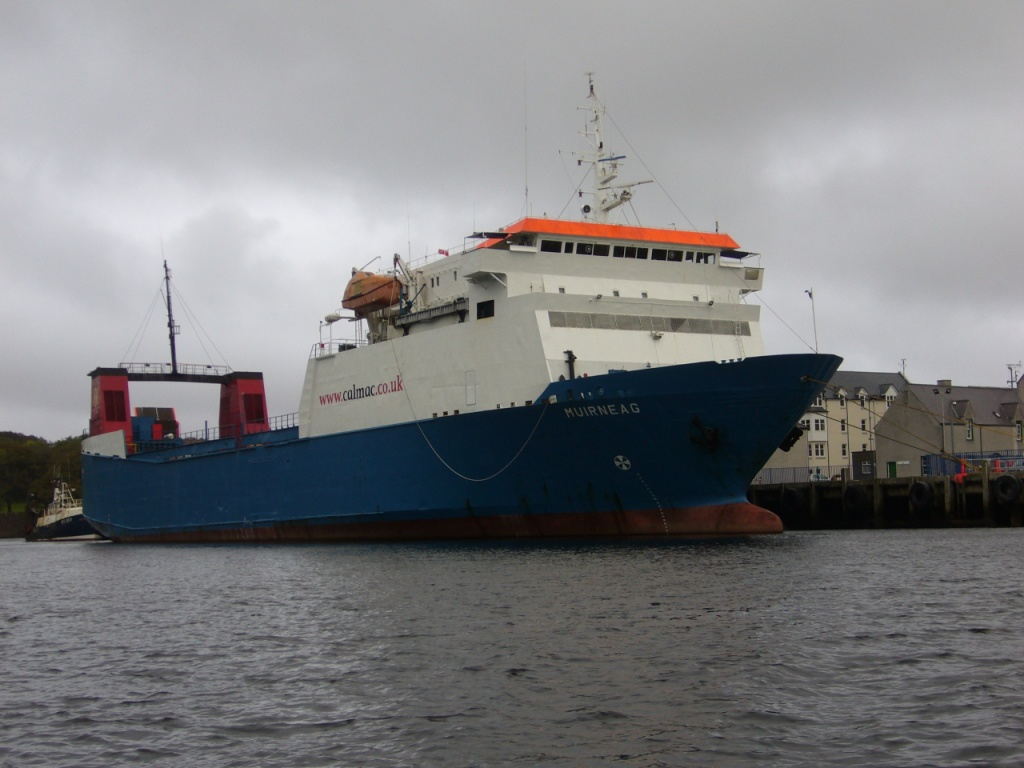
- MV Hatay

History

Panama
- Name: 1979: Mercandian Carrier; 1984: Alianza; 1984: Mercandian Carrier II; 1985: Belard; 2002: Muirneag; 2018: Hatay
- Namesake: mountain on Lewis
- Owner: 1979: Merc-Scandia KS; 1985: P&O Irish Sea; 1994: Isle of Man Steam Packet Company (Mannin Line); 1998: Aabrenaa Rederi A/S; 2002: Harrisons (Clyde), Glasgow; 2002-2013: Caledonian MacBrayne; 2013: N/A
- Operator: Mediterraline Ro-Ro Services
- Port of registry: Panama
- Route: 2002-2013: Stornoway to Ullapool
- Builder: Frederikshavn Vaerft A/S, Frederikshavn Denmark
- Cost: £3.2 million
- Yard number: 380
- Launched: 25 April 1979
- Acquired: 2002
- Identification: IMO number: 7725362; MMSI number: 372584000 (2018); 235007463 (2013); Callsign: 3FIS5 (2018); VQBE3 (2013)
- Status: in service

General characteristics
- Class & type: FV 610 256 TEU ro-ro freight ferry
- Tonnage: 3,350 GT
- Length: 105.5 metres (346 ft)
- Beam: 18.8 metres (62 ft)
- Draught: 5 metres (16 ft)
- Installed power: 12-cyl, MaK diesel
- Speed: 15.5 knots (28.7 km/h) (service)
- Capacity: 12 pax; 756 lanemeters

MV Muirneag is a ro-ro freight ferry, built in 1979 as MV Mercandian Carrier. From 1986 to 2002, she was named MV Belard, serving initially across the Irish Sea. From 2002 to 2013, she was chartered by Caledonian MacBrayne on the Stornoway to Ullapool freight crossing, until she was replaced by Clipper Ranger.

== History ==
MV Mercandian Carrier was built in 1979 for Merc-Scandia KS in Frederikshavn, Denmark. In 1985 she was sold to P&O Irish Sea for the Belfast to Ardrossan service. She underwent an extensive refit, costing one million pounds and was renamed Belard, a name created from the first three letters of the ports served. In 1993, she was replaced on the Irish Sea service by the larger and faster Merchant Valiant. Her next owners, the Isle of Man Steam Packet Company, operated her across the Irish Sea. From May 1995, she carried out a variety of charters, until she was sold in January 1998 to Aabrenaa Rederi A/S of Kingstown, St. Vincent for service in Norway and the Baltic. Returning to UK waters in 2001, she was chartered for the Aberdeen to Lerwick service and then Ipswich to Ostend.

In 2002, she was purchased by Harrisons of Glasgow and entered a long-term charter to Caledonian MacBrayne for a freight service between Ullapool and Stornoway. She was renamed Muirneag, the Gaelic name of a mountain on Lewis and of a 1903 Zulu herring drifter from Stornoway, the last herring drifter in Britain to be worked by sails alone. Muirneag had a blue hull with Calmac branding and funnels. Sailing overnight across the Minch, she had to withstand extremely poor sea conditions, which she handled well. She took additional daytime crossings, to clear a backlog of commercial traffic when MV Isle of Lewis broke down. However poor manoeuvrability when berthing under light loading unfairly gave her the nickname 'the Olympic Flame'. In November 2005, she spent 15 hours attempting to gain access to Stornoway Harbour in a heavy storm.

By 2013, it was recognised that Muirneag was no longer viable for the overnight freight service. With safety certifications about to lapse, it was announced on 10 September 2013, that the Seatruck Ferries vessel Clipper Ranger would replace Muirneag from 21 September, pending successful berthing trials at Ullapool and Stornoway on 19 September. The larger vessel was chartered until July 2014, when the new German-built ferry Loch Seaforth replaced both current vessels and now provides a 24/7 single-vessel service to Lewis.

It was announced on 25 September 2013 that Muirneag had been sold for further service to Turkish owners at £600,000.

== Layout ==
Prior to taking up the Irish Sea service in 1986, Belard underwent an extensive refit. Vectwin rudders were fitted to give her the manoeuvrability required at Ardrossan. A directional Elliot White Gill Jet was fitted augmenting her single propeller. The vehicle lift to her upper freight deck was replaced with an internal ramp.

== Service ==
1979	Denmark
Feb 1986	Belfast – Ardrossan
Jan 1993	Larne – Ardrossan
Nov 1993	Great Yarmouth – IJmuiden, Holland
1998	Åbenrå – Klaipėda and Bergen – Sola
2001	Aberdeen – Lerwick and then Ipswich – Ostend charters
2002–2013	Stornoway to Ullapool
2013–	unknown

== See also ==
- Caledonian MacBrayne fleet
- Calmac website
- Ships of Calmac
