= MV Loch Seaforth (2014) =

Scottish ferry which entered service in 2015

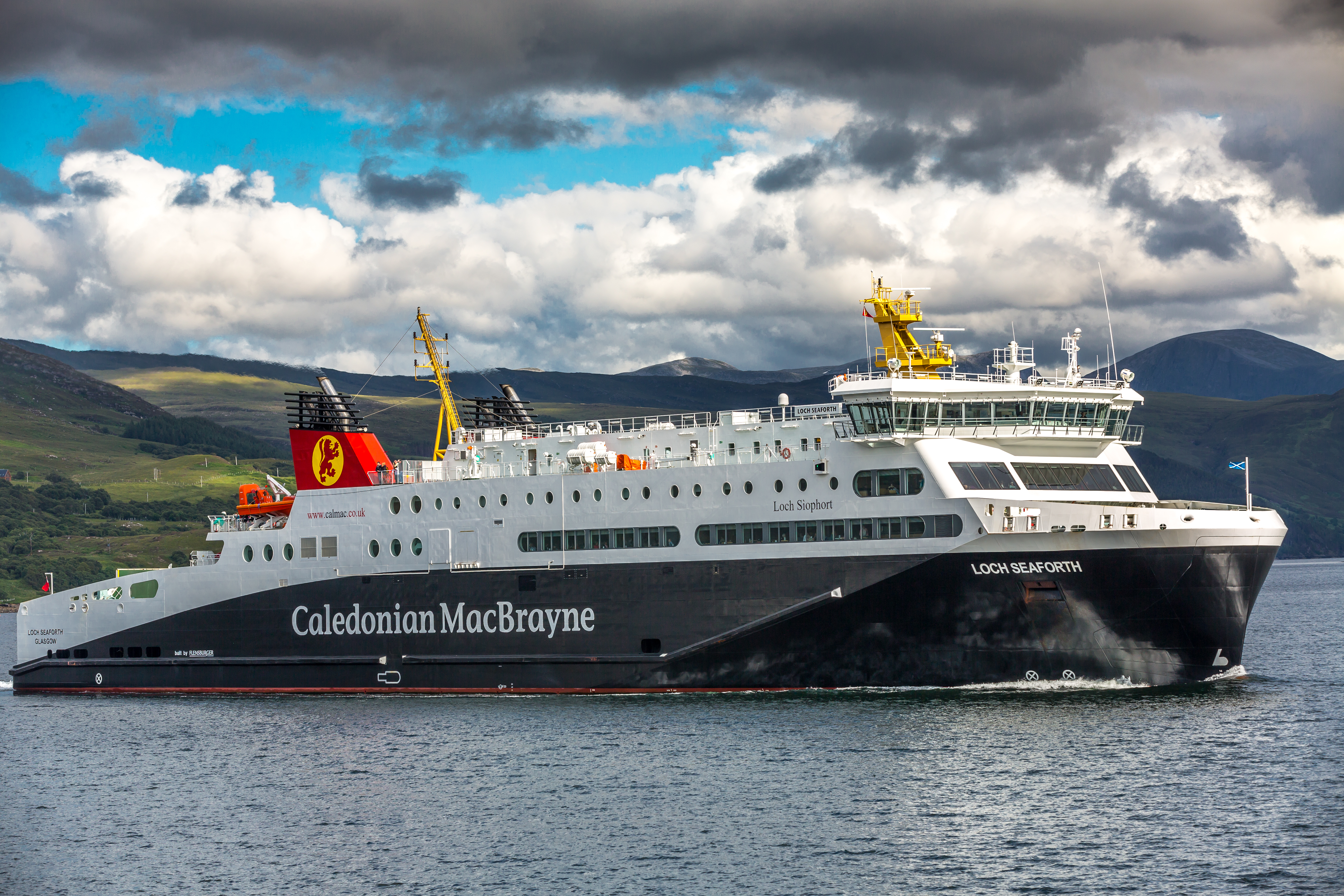
- Loch Seaforth in Ullapool, July 2015.

History

United Kingdom
- Name: MV Loch Seaforth; Scottish Gaelic: Loch Sìophort
- Namesake: Loch Seaforth
- Owner: Caledonian Maritime Assets
- Operator: Caledonian MacBrayne
- Port of registry: Glasgow
- Route: Stornoway — Ullapool
- Ordered: 22 June 2012
- Builder: Flensburger Schiffbau-Gesellschaft MBH and Co KG, Flensburg, Germany
- Cost: £42 million
- Yard number: 764
- Launched: 21 March 2014
- Christened: by Joan Murray
- In service: 16 February 2015
- Identification: IMO number: 9665437; MMSI number: 235101635; Callsign: 2GYU4

General characteristics
- Type: Passenger/Ro-Ro Cargo Ferry
- Tonnage: 8,680 Gross Tonnage; 2604 Net Tonnage; 1500 Deadweight
- Displacement: 3496
- Length: 117.90 m (386 ft 10 in) (Overall) 111.14 m (364 ft 8 in) (Between Perpendiculars)
- Beam: 19.2 m (63 ft 0 in)
- Draught: 4.8 m (15 ft 9 in)
- Depth: 7.0 m (23 ft 0 in)
- Installed power: 2 × 4000 kW Wärtsilä 8 L 32 (main); 3 × 1600 kW (generators); 2 × 700 kW (auxiliary & emergency generators); 3 × 900 kW thrusters
- Propulsion: Twin 4.10 m diameter controllable pitch propellers; 2 Bow Thrusters; 1 Stern Thruster
- Speed: 19.2 kn (35.6 km/h)
- Capacity: 700 passengers; 143 cars (on main deck and 2 mezzanine decks), or; 20 commercial vehicles; 376 lane metres
- Crew: 43

MV Loch Seaforth is a ferry operated by Caledonian MacBrayne between Stornoway and Ullapool. She was launched on 21 March 2014 and entered service in mid-February 2015, replacing both the former vessel, 1995-built MV Isle of Lewis and a chartered freight vessel (latterly MS Clipper Ranger).

== History ==
Scottish Transport Minister Keith Brown announced on 8 June 2012 there was to be a replacement vessel for the Stornoway-Ullapool route. Two weeks later on 22 June, Caledonian Maritime Assets announced that the contract to construct had been signed with Flensburger Schiffbau-Gesellschaft MBH and Co KG in Germany. Construction commenced on 16 September 2013 with the cutting of the first steel. The shed at the Flensburger shipyard suffered damage in the St. Jude storm, delaying delivery by about two weeks.

The building of the ferry was financed by the Lloyds Banking Group who then leased Loch Seaforth to Caledonian Maritime Assets Ltd (CMAL) who in turn chartered her to the operator, Caledonian MacBrayne. Ownership remained with Lloyds until 10 October 2019, when CMAL purchased Loch Seaforth outright, ending the lease after almost five years. Over a month after buying Loch Seaforth outright from Lloyds, CMAL announced that they paid £36 million for her.

The name was chosen in a competition run by CMAL, reviving that of MacBrayne's 1947 Stornoway mailboat. Before launch, there was speculation over the timetables for the new vessel. Despite being capable of 24-hour operation, there were concerns that she would not carry out 24-hour sailings in summer.

Loch Seaforth was launched on 21 March 2014 and christened by Joan Murray, the eldest daughter of the late Captain John Smith, master of the original 1947 mailboat. She departed Germany on her delivery voyage on 4 November 2014 and arrived in Greenock three days later. After sea trials, she was laid up as the piers at Stornoway and Ullapool were unfinished.

Loch Seaforth sailed to Stornoway on 12 November 2014, to conduct berthing trials, which were successful and returned to the Clyde. On 6 December 2014, she sailed to carry out crew familiarisation tests at Stornoway, despite the terminal not being ready to accommodate her. Once again, she returned to the Clyde.

Loch Seaforth undertook berthing trials at the new pier at Stornoway on 4 February 2015. Her first commercial sailing was the overnight freight sailing on 10/11 February. An open day for public viewing was held in Stornoway on 13 February, and she gave her first passenger crossing of the Minch the following day. She entered public service on 16 February, initially on a 'phasing-in' basis, but full-time, effectively relieving Isle of Lewis, which was delayed in leaving drydock in Birkenhead during her annual overhaul. On 5 March, Loch Seaforth developed a ventilation fan problem at Ullapool, leaving the Isle of Lewis to take passengers and their vehicles to Stornoway, putting her new backup status to the test.

The Ullapool port reopened in May 2015 with a new linkspan. Loch Seaforth was finally able to take up her full round-the-clock schedule between Stornoway and Ullapool. Chartered freight vessel, MS Clipper Ranger left Stornoway for Heysham after staying in reserve for any teething troubles. MV Isle of Lewis remained as a backup vessel on the route until the summer of 2015, undertaking extra sailings on Fridays and Saturdays during the summer of 2015 to cope with demand.

Loch Seaforth was withdrawn from service due to engine failure on 16 April 2021. The ship went for repairs and returned to service on 31 May 2021. MV Isle of Lewis returned to maintain the service, at reduced capacity, with MV Isle of Arran and then MV Hebridean Isles providing a night freight service. This redeployment caused disruption on several crossings across the CalMac network. From 19 July 2021, MS Arrow was chartered by Caledonian MacBrayne to carry freight on the Stornoway to Ullapool route, freeing MV Loch Seaforth to make additional passenger crossings.

== Layout ==
MV Loch Seaforth is of ro-ro design with bow and stern ramps. She has "clam shell" bow doors that open sideways. The car deck provides 376 lane-metres and is partially open at the stern. Car capacity is augmented by two hoistable mezzanine decks. Five stairways and two passenger lifts give access to the main passenger accommodation on Deck 5. This includes a Quiet Lounge, a shop, a Coffee Cabin, a play area and a gaming area. Towards the bow is a cafeteria, with an observation lounge looking forwards, on the deck above. There is outside seating towards the stern on decks 6 and 7.

The combination of diesel electrical and diesel mechanical propulsion give a high level of redundancy. The two Wärtsilä 8L 32 main engines can use IFO 40 and MDO fuel oils. Three backup diesel generators would allow her to operate to timetable even with one main engine out of service.

== Service ==
MV Loch Seaforth is operated by Caledonian MacBrayne on the Stornoway to Ullapool route. She provides passenger sailings through the day and an overnight freight service.

From 29 October to 12 November 2015, Loch Seaforth was relieved by MV Isle of Lewis and the NorthLink vessel MS Hildasay.

From the summer 2023 timetable she has been slowed down from 2 hours 30 minutes to 2 hours 40 minutes on the Stornoway to Ullapool route, the same journey time as Isle of Lewis until 2004 when her journey time was increased by five minutes. This is due to a combination of fuel costs and growth on the hull slowing her down. In March 2023, Robert Morrison, CalMac Director of Operations, stated that the timetable set upon Loch Seaforth's entry to service was "ambitious" and "hard to deliver on a good day".

On 10 April 2023, Loch Seaforth suffered engine control issues en route from Stornoway to Ullapool. Upon arrival in Ullapool, services were suspended, with some travellers having to re-route via the Uig - Tarbert service.
