= Kurkse (ship) =

Estonian cargo ship

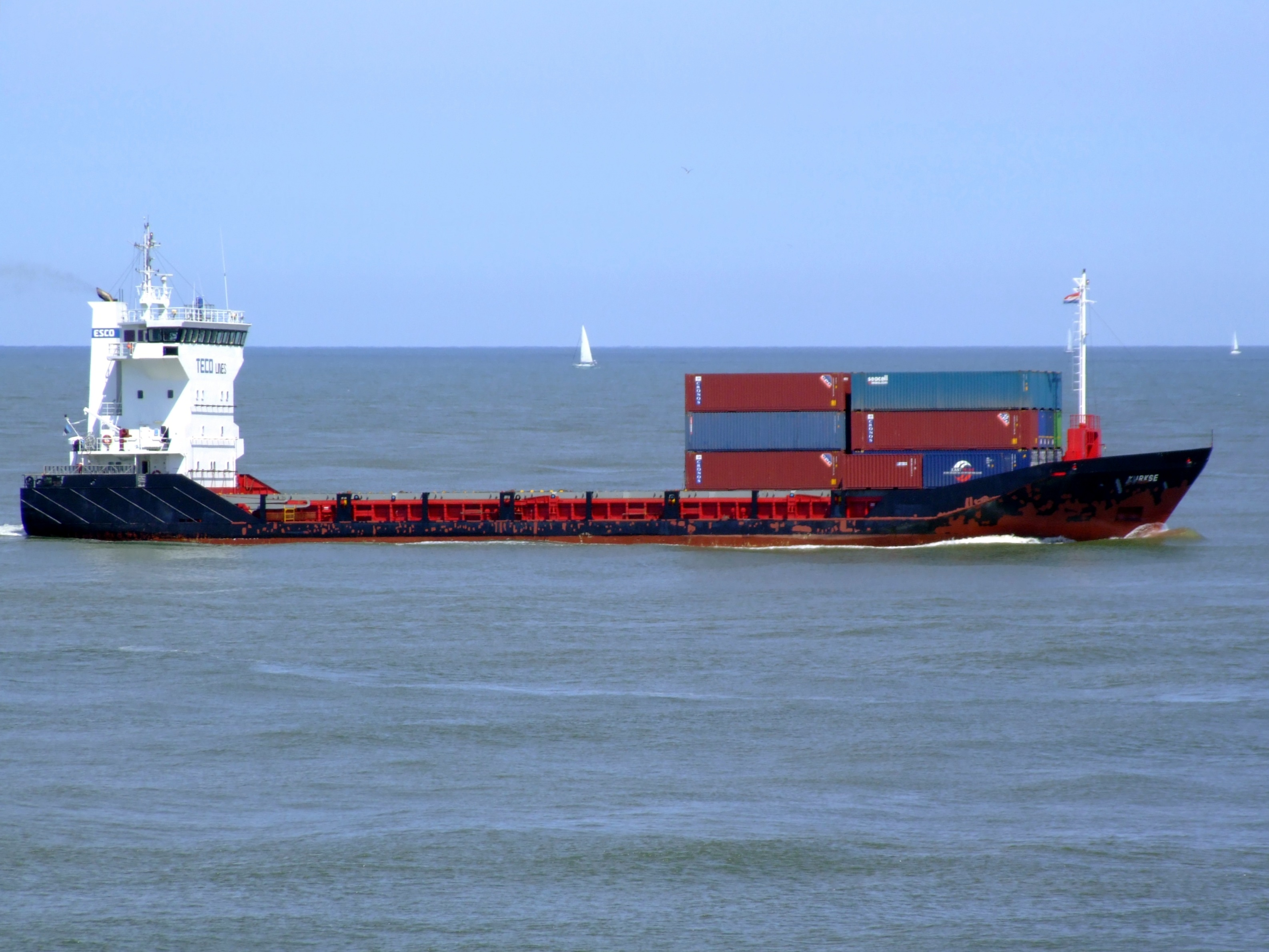
- Kurkse approaching Port of Rotterdam

History
- Name: Kurkse
- Owner: Estonian Shipping Company
- Port of registry: Estonia
- Builder: Bijlholt B.V Shipyard
- Launched: 1997
- Acquired: 7 May 1997
- Identification: Call sign: IMO number: 9103790; MMSI no.: 228372900
- Fate: In service

General characteristics
- Class & type: Muuga-class
- Tonnage: 2,658 GT
- Length: 90.67 m (297 ft 6 in)
- Beam: 15.85 m (52 ft 0 in)
- Draught: 4.4 m (14 ft 5 in)
- Speed: 12.9 knots

Kurkse is a cargo ship which was ordered by Estonian Shipping Company in 1997. It was the fifth and last ship of her class.

The ship route was Tallinn-Stockholm-Antwerpen-Rotterdam-Tallinn when it was in ESCO service. Kurkse was one of the last cargo ships that was deleted from Estonian shipregister and her sister ship Kalana was deleted one month later. Since then there are no more cargo ships sailing under Estonian flag.

== Sister ships ==
- Kalana

== Incidents ==
On 9 March 2007, Kurkse collided with Bulgarian flagged ship MSC Bulgaria during maneuvering in Hamburg port. No people were hurt and both ships suffered only minimal damage. According to German police, Kurkse caused 2 meter long crack in the side of the MSC Bulgaria and Kurkse deck building was easily damaged.
