= MV Manxman =

Isle of Man ferry

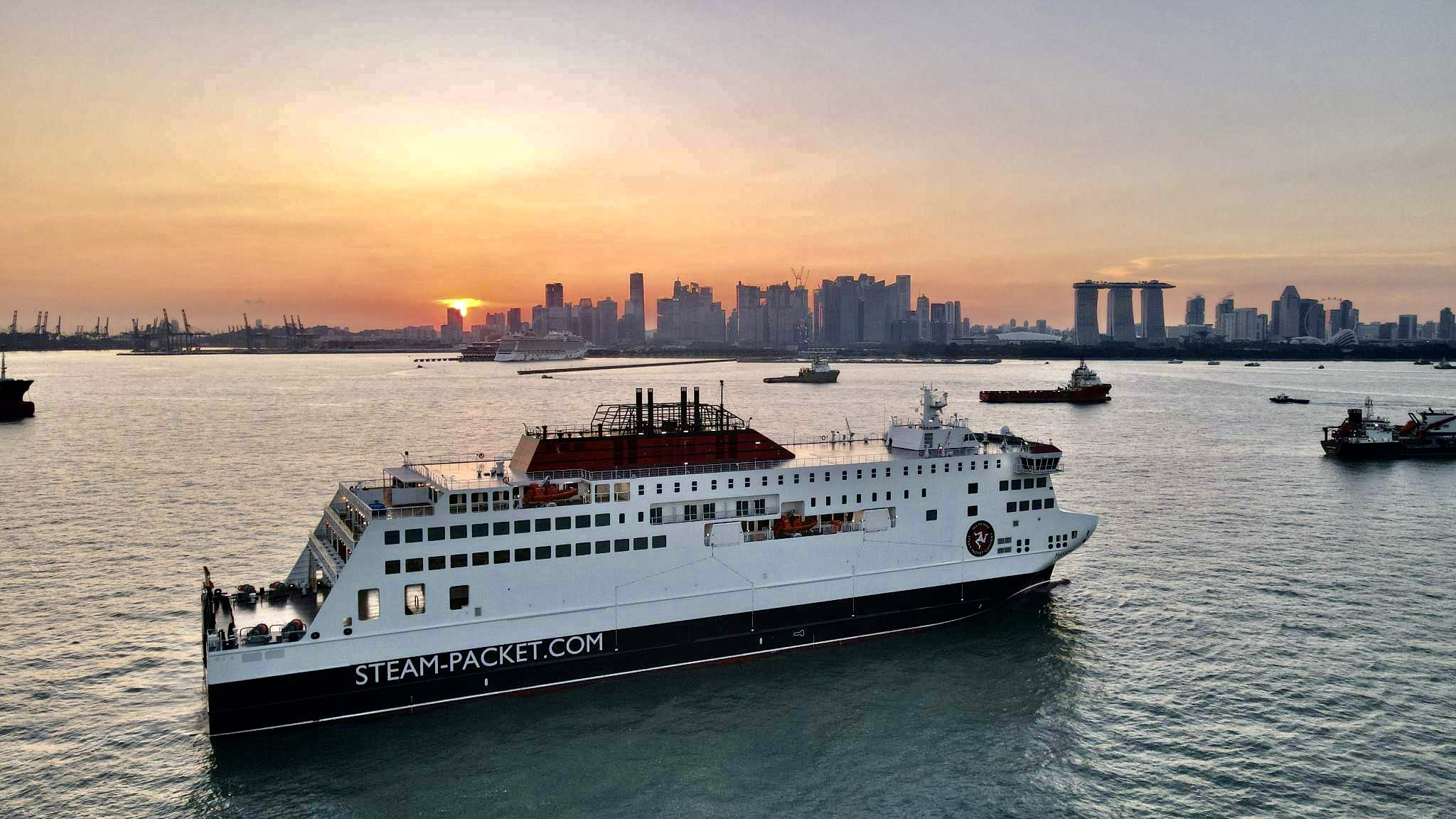
- Manxman at anchor in Singapore

History
- Name: Manxman
- Owner: Isle of Man Steam Packet Company
- Operator: Isle of Man Steam Packet Company
- Port of registry: (Isle of Man) Douglas
- Route: Douglas - Heysham Douglas - Liverpool (Winter Only - From 9 November 2024)
- Ordered: 31 July 2020
- Builder: Hyundai Mipo Dockyard, South Korea
- Cost: GB £78,000,000
- Yard number: 8311
- Laid down: 24 December 2021
- Launched: 14 June 2022
- Christened: 3 May 2023
- Completed: 20 April 2023
- Acquired: 10 May 2023
- In service: 17 August 2023
- Identification: IMO number: 9917244; MMSI Number: 232041396; Callsign: MLHL7
- Status: In service

General characteristics
- Type: Ro-pax ferry
- Tonnage: 24,161 GT
- Length: 133.0 m (436 ft)
- Beam: 26.0 m (85 ft)
- Draught: 5.2 m (17 ft)
- Installed power: 2 x Wärtsilä 31 10-cylinder diesels, and 2 x Wärtsilä 31 8-cylinder diesels
- Propulsion: 3 × bow thrusters
- Speed: 19.25 knots (35.65 km/h; 22.15 mph)
- Capacity: Passengers: 948 Cars: 237 Trailers: 75
- Crew: 52

MV Manxman is a ro-pax ferry that entered service with the Isle of Man Steam Packet Company (IoMSPCo) on 17 August 2023.

== Construction and delivery ==
The ship was ordered on 31 July 2020 and was built by the Hyundai Mipo Dockyard, Ulsan, South Korea, being laid down on 24 December 2021.

Construction commenced in the summer of 2021. On 1 December 2020, following a naming competition, it was announced that the ship would be named Manxman, the third vessel in the history of the line to bear the name.

=== Sea trials ===
Manxman started her first sea trials in December 2022. However, during the course of the trials a significant fault was found in the ship's gearbox. This necessitated a return to the shipyard where the gearbox was replaced.

The Sea Trials resumed in April and were carried out over the course of ten days in the Korea Strait between South Korea and the Japanese island of Tsushima. The trials involved various tests on the vessel's maneuverability, speed and fuel consumption, with the tests proving satisfactory.

=== Naming ceremony ===
On May 3, 2023, Manxman officially received her name during a ceremony held at the Mipo Dockyard, the christening being performed by Geraldine Ugland. As is the case with Isle of Man Steam Packet Company tradition, the name was painted in gold remaining so for the first year of her service.

=== Delivery ===
At 02:40 GMT, 11:40 local time, on 11 May 2023, Manxman was officially handed over when Chairman of the Board of the Isle of Man Steam Packet Company, Lars Ugland, signed the official documentation to complete the transfer of ownership on behalf of the Company.

On Saturday May 13, under the command of Captain Andy Atkinson, Manxman departed South Korea en route to Southampton for additional fitting out prior to her commencement of service.

The delivery voyage of approximately 12,000 miles was originally planned to stage via Hong Kong, Singapore, Colombo, Muscat and Jeddah prior to transiting the Suez Canal, and then to Gibraltar and England. However, an alteration en route resulted in the stop at Gibraltar being cancelled, and thus Manxman made passage through the Mediterranean via Malta which was her last port of call prior to reaching Southampton.

Manxman arrived at the pilot station off Douglas at 08:15 GMT on Sunday July 2. She was boarded by the senior pilot for the Port of Douglas, Captain Stephen Carter, before she proceeded to No. 5 Berth, King Edward VIII Pier. The occasion marked Capt. Carter's final duty prior to his retirement.

=== Welcoming ceremony ===
Foremost of the celebrations around Manxman's arrival was her official welcoming ceremony, which took place at Douglas on Sunday, 9 July. The ceremony was performed by Janice McDowall, Manageress of IoMSPCo's Liverpool Terminal. The formalities were streamed live to a big screen which had been constructed on Douglas Head, in addition to which the company's Managing Director, Brian Thomson, made a speech on the quayside, and at 11:15 local time the traditional champagne bottle was broken onto Manxman’s bow.

The occasion also saw the Chief Minister of the Isle of Man, Alfred Cannan MHK, given a guided tour of the ship. The festivities concluded with a firework display in Douglas Bay and a sail past by Manxman.

== Service ==
Following arrival at her home port, Manxman spent a period undergoing operating drills and docking procedures. Part of this prelude to working up to operational efficiency saw Manxman make her first visit to the Port of Heysham on 11 July 2023.

Manxman commenced operational service on Thursday 17 August 2023 on the company's main schedule to Heysham, replacing Ben-my-Chree. The Company decided to retain Ben-my-Chree on a standby basis, to be in service during busy periods or when Manxman undergoes routine overhaul.

== Incidents ==
On 21 August 2024 the vessel collided with the link span bridge at Heysham port, this resulted in minor damage to the vessel, no injuries, but took the link span bridge out of service for a few months.

On 1 March 2025 the vessel ran aground while docking in Douglas Harbour due to a lower-than-expected tide. After thorough examination no damage was found, though a precautionary diver inspection would be carried out later. Her evening sailing departed with a two-hour delay.

On 19 August 2025 smoke was detected in a machinery space, resulting in a muster of passengers to emergency stations and the triggering of shoreside emergency response. All passengers disembarked safely. At least one return sailing was cancelled as a result and Ben-my-Chree was brought into action.
