= Dart (1794 ship) =

History

Great Britain
- Name: Dart
- Owner: Robert Grey
- Builder: Young, Rotherhithe
- Launched: 1794
- Fate: Unknown

General characteristics
- Tons burthen: 225, or 2256/94 (bm)
- Length: Overall: 84 ft 3 in (25.7 m); Keel: 65 ft 6 in (20.0 m)
- Beam: 25 ft 5 in (7.7 m)
- Depth of hold: 11 ft 11 in (3.6 m)

Dart was launched in 1794 at Rotherhithe for Captain Robert Grey, her master and owner. The British East India Company (EIC) engaged her as a packet boat. She made two voyages for the EIC and then disappears from readily accessible online records.

EIC voyage #1 (1794–1795): Captain Robert Grey sailed from London on 25 July 1794, and from Torbay on 29 August, bound for St Helena and Bengal. Dart reached St Helena on 9 November and arrived at Calcutta on 27 February 1795. Homeward bound, she was at St Helena on 19 June. She reached Torbay on 9 August and arrived at Blackwall on 23 August.

EIC voyage #2 (1795–1797): Captain Grey sailed from London on 15 October 1795 and from Portsmouth on 13 November, bound for St Helena and Bengal. Dart reached the Cape of Good Hope on 29 January 1796.

She delivered chests containing specie to the value of £20,000 to Major General Sir James Henry Craig, who had just captured Cape Colony. Craig then sent Dart to St Helena on 14 February to request that Governor Brooke supply small specie (particularly rupees and half rupees), up to £10,000 in value. Apparently, the silver that Dart had brought from Britain was in the form of French crowns and dollars and was being hoarded rather than circulating.

Dart arrived at St Helena on 2 March, before returning to the Cape on 31 March. She arrived at Calcutta on 2 June. Homeward bound, she was at Diamond Harbour on 17 July, reached St Helena on 10 October and Dartmouth on 7 December. She arrived at Blackwall on 24 January 1797.

As of November 2022 Dart's subsequent history is obscure. Although one source states that she became a whaler, that Dart was a different vessel.
