= MS Ben-my-Chree =

Isle of Man ferry

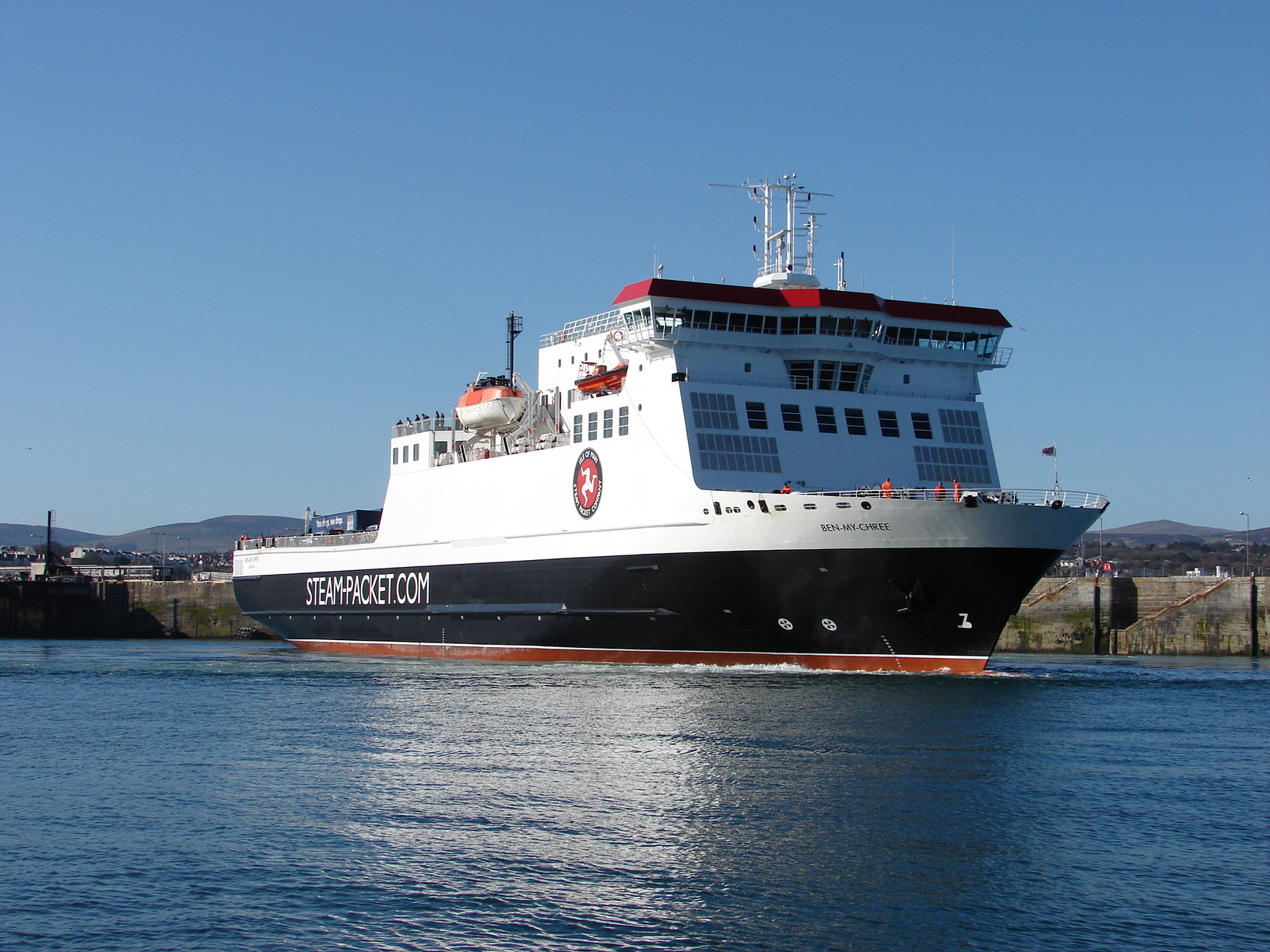
- Ben-my-Chree in Douglas Harbour in April 2010

History

Isle of Man
- Name: Ben-my-Chree
- Namesake: Manx: Girl of my heart
- Owner: Isle of Man Steam Packet Company
- Operator: Isle of Man Steam Packet Company
- Port of registry: (Isle of Man) Douglas Harbour
- Ordered: 1997
- Builder: van der Giessen de Noord, Netherlands
- Cost: £24,500,000
- Yard number: 971
- Laid down: 1997
- Launched: 4 April 1998
- Commissioned: 1998
- Identification: IMO number: 9170705; MMSI Number 234983000; Callsign MXLG6
- Status: In service

General characteristics
- Tonnage: 12,747 GT
- Length: 125.2 m (411 ft)
- Beam: 23.4 m (77 ft)
- Draught: 5.0 m (16.4 ft)
- Installed power: 2 × MAK 9L32 diesel engines
- Propulsion: 2 × controllable pitch propellers; 2 × bow thrusters
- Speed: 19.5 knots (36.1 km/h; 22.4 mph)
- Capacity: Passengers: 500; Cars: 200

Ben-my-Chree is a Ro-Pax vessel which was launched and entered service in 1998. The flagship of the Isle of Man Steam Packet Company, she primarily operated on the Douglas to Heysham route until being replaced by MV Manxman in 2023.

== History ==
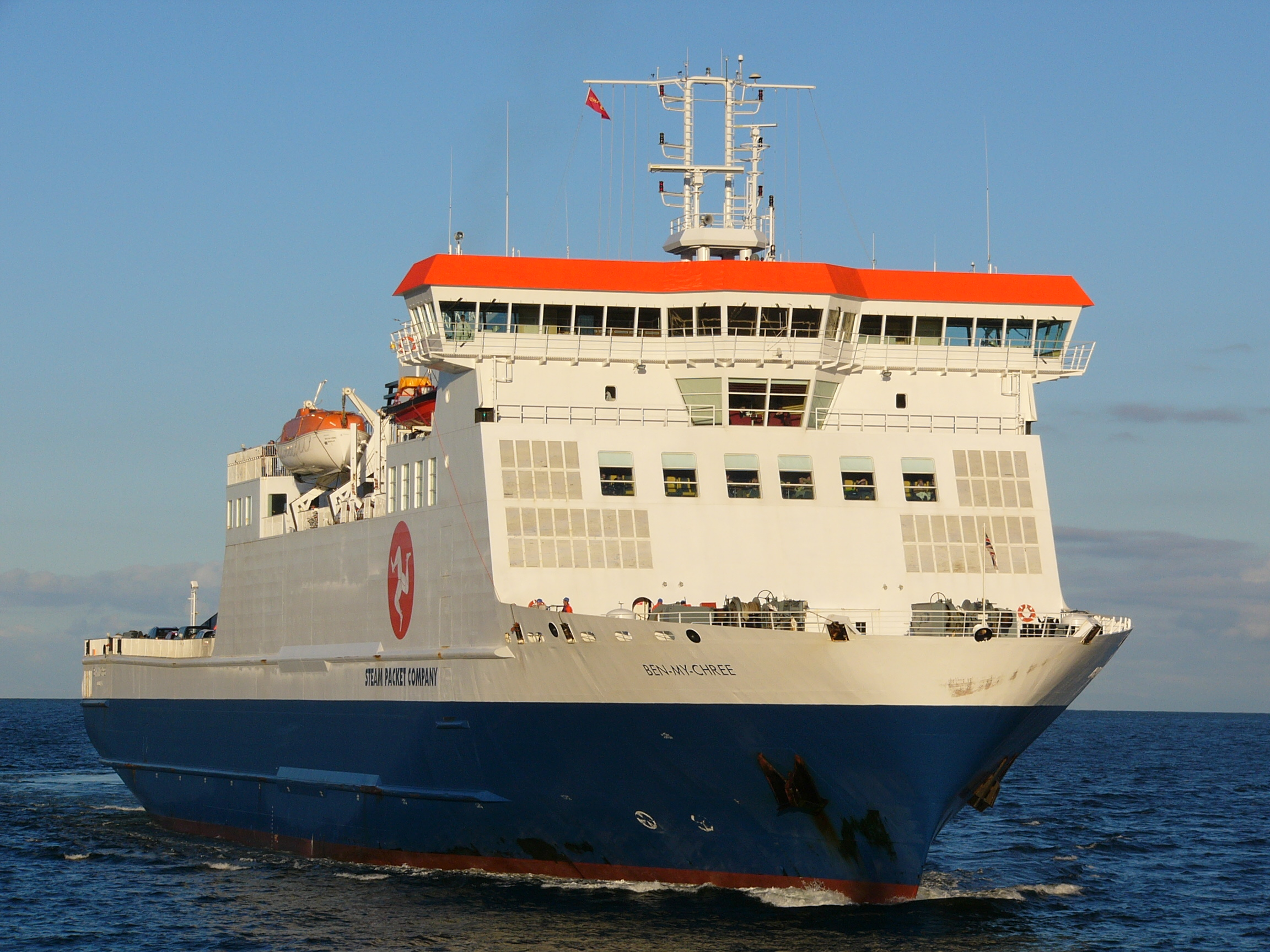
Ben-my-Chree in October 2004

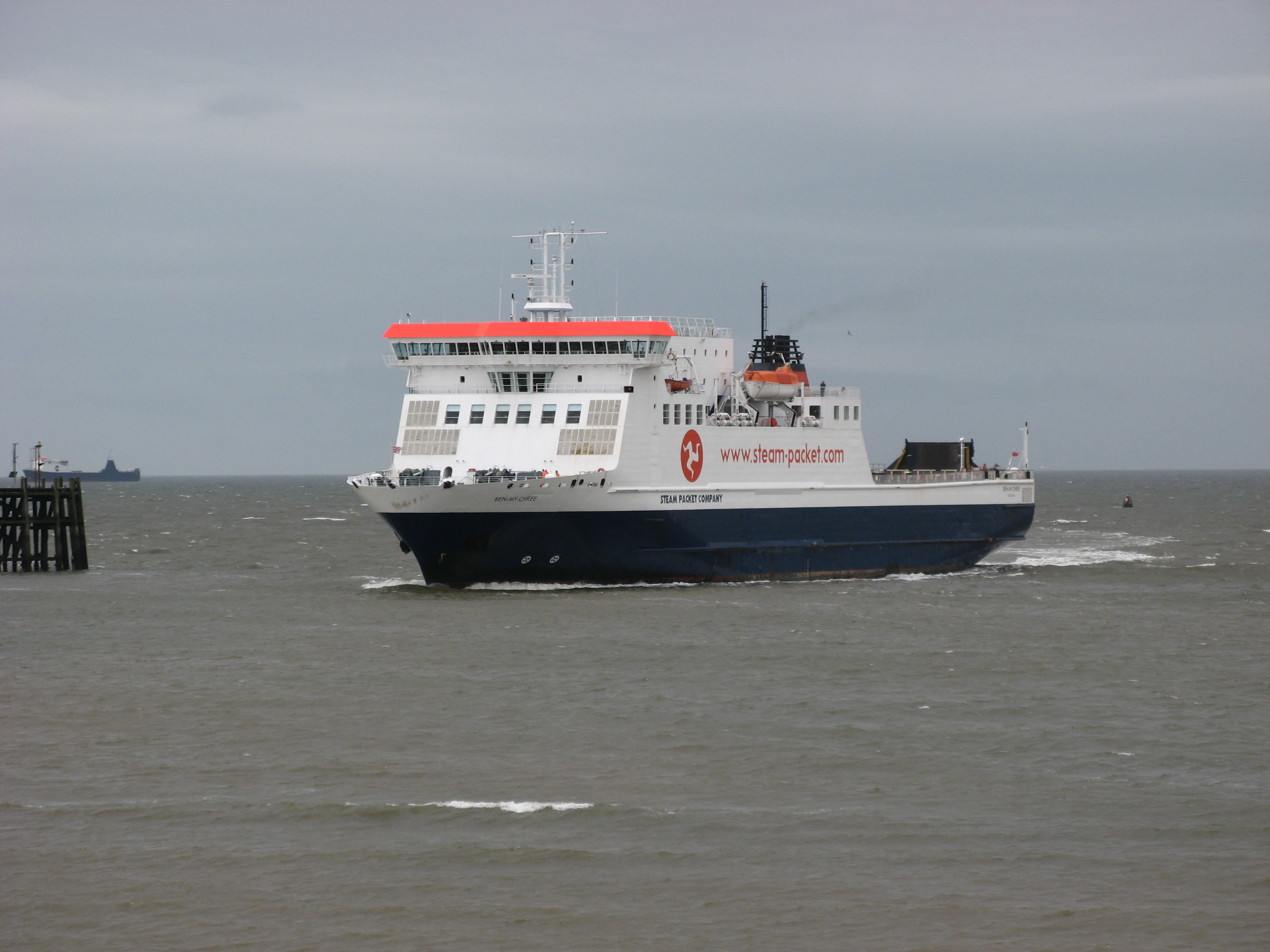
Ben-my-Chree approaching Heysham Port in September 2007

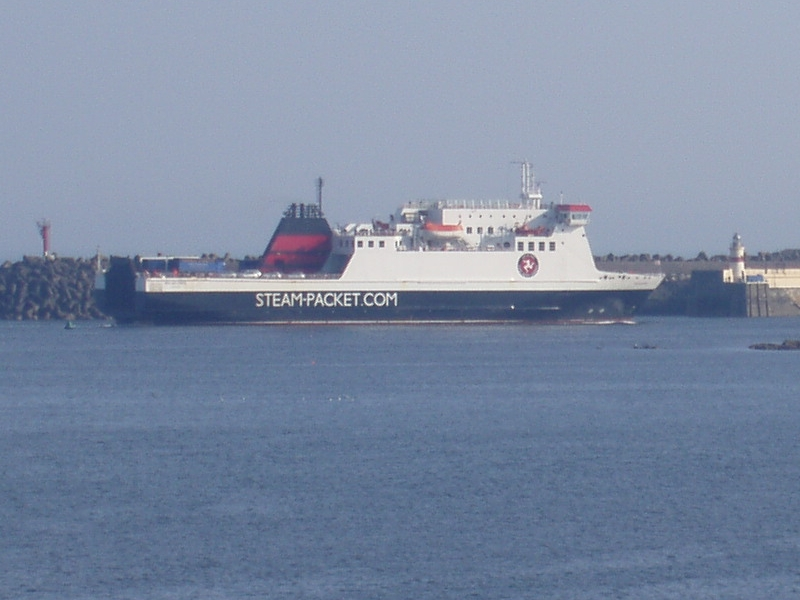
Ben-my-Chree entering Douglas Harbour in April 2009

Ben-my-Chree was ordered in 1997 by Sea Containers for the Isle of Man Steam Packet Company. Costing around £24 million, she was built by van der Giessen de Noord of the Netherlands and launched on 4 April 1998. The sixth vessel to carry the name, she is registered in Douglas, Isle of Man.

Ben-my-Chree entered service on 5 July 1998, Tynwald Day - the Isle of Man's national holiday. At a gross tonnage of around 12,000, she was the largest ship to enter service with the company. The vessel received criticism due to her low passenger capacity of 500 (carrying no more than 350 per sailing), and the fact she had no open deck for passengers. The company insisted this was a "comfort level" for the vessel's size.

In 2004, the vessel underwent a refit carried out by Cammell Laird to increase passenger capacity with the addition of a new passenger module. In 2014, Ben-my-Chree underwent a £1.6 million refit which included new LED lighting fitted to the lounge areas, refitted the crew rest area, this was also carried out by Cammell Laird.

=== Incidents ===
On 25 July 2008, Ben-my-Chree suffered a technical failure, with the Viking taking her Heysham sailing until she was repaired.

On 26 March 2010, Ben-my-Chree experienced unintended movement while berthed at Heysham Port, resulting in a walkway collapse, trapping eight people in the gangway compartment of the shore access structure; they were assisted in leaving by the fire service.

On the evening of 1 May 2013 when arriving in Douglas Harbour from Heysham, Ben-my-Chree struck part of the King Edward Pier linkspan. In the collision part of the ship was slightly damaged, meaning the evening departure to Heysham was delayed by two hours, with the Manannan arriving from Liverpool as replacement. The service arrived at Heysham only around thirty minutes late. Ben-my-Chree re-entered service the following day with a freight-only service to Heysham, and full service from that point onwards.

In December 2011, the Ben-my-Chree suffered a number of cancelled sailings due to high winds and a problem with a bow thruster that had been damaged in May that year. Arrangements to dry dock the ship in June and then in September had to be cancelled after the manufacturers, Wartsilla, failed to complete the necessary repairs. Chief executive of the Steam Packet Company wrote to the local newspaper, the Manx Independent to express the company's frustration at the ongoing problems.

On 12 February 2015, Ben-my-Chree lost control and collided with a fishing boat, while entering Douglas Harbour. The vessel's stern made contact with Battery Pier and a fishing boat at its mooring. It was found that the ship and the fishing boat only suffered superficial damage. The ship was checked by divers for signs of damage to the propellers and steering. It was then relocated to the Victoria Pier using a tug boat where passengers disembarked.

On 2 May 2015, the morning sailing from Douglas to Heysham and the afternoon return was cancelled. Ben-my-Chree was suffering from a "bow thruster... only operating on reduced power". On 16 May 2015, there was a suspected chimney stack lagging fire was detected on the 8.45am crossing from Douglas to Heysham. The sailing arrived in Heysham Port around 1 hour late and no passengers or crew were injured.

On 12 February 2017, the vessel made contact with the pier at Douglas whilst attempting to moor in high winds on arrival from Birkenhead. MS Arrow and HSC Manannan were planned to take over the freight and passenger duties. On 9 April 2017, Ben-my-Chree suffered an engine failure after arriving at Heysham Port. As a result, two return crossings were cancelled and the vessel limped back to Douglas on one engine without passengers.

== Design and construction ==
Ben-my-Chree is a Ro-Pax ferry, largely designed to carry freight, with two vehicle decks (decks 3 and 5) and two passenger accommodation decks (7 and 8). There are 20 four-berth cabins and crew accommodation for 22. Her freight capacity is 200 vehicles (1235m).

A refit during her first winter improved passenger accommodation. Reclining chairs were added in the forward and aft lounges and partitions added between the restaurant and bar areas. In 2004, a major refit allowed her to carry a full capacity of 636 passengers. A new accommodation section containing the Legends café/bar, Niarbyl Quiet Lounge and toilets was added. The refit also created an outside deck space and modifications were made to the vessel's stern door. Another refit in April 2008 included a new livery and internal refit.

The Royal New Zealand Navy multi-role vessel HMNZS Canterbury, based on Ben-my-Chree's design, entered service in 2007.

== Service ==
On 16 July 2018, Ben-my-Chree completed 20 years of Manx service. She operates primarily on the Douglas to Heysham route, with occasional services to Belfast.

In October 2024, it was reported that Ben-my-Chree would conduct berthing trials at Troon and Brodick for a potential charter to Caledonian MacBrayne, due to ongoing disruption caused by fleet maintenance. If successful, she would have provided additional services to the Isle of Arran. On 31 October 2024, Ben-my-Chree undertook the berthing trials at Troon and Brodick, however these trials were unsuccessful and the vessel returned to Douglas.

From December 2024 until 15 January 2025 she was chartered out to Stena Line to operate a temporary route between Heysham and Dublin for freight traffic caused by the closure of Holyhead due to damage caused by Storm Darragh.

In January 2026 Ben-my-Chree was chartered to Stena Line for four months. Initially covering the Fishguard/Rosslare route, due to Stena Nordica covering the Holyhead/Dublin route as this route's usual ship, Stena Estrid, underwent repairs at Cammell Laird following hull damage during a call at Holyhead on the 7 January 2026.

From Spring 2026 Ben-my-Chree will operate on a new service from Douglas to Larne.

== Replacement ==
In March 2013, the chairman of local group TravelWatch, Brendan O’Friel, said "The Ben is currently mid-way through her life and she is starting now to develop problems of one sort or another. She is not as reliable as she was. A replacement would take two years to build and we are keen to see plans go ahead." In Issue 17 of the company newsletter, Steam Packet Times, Chief Executive Mark Woodward explained that "Now that the refinancing has been completed we have begun the process of assessing the longer term - it is clear that the most significant investment in the coming years will be replacement vessels for Ben-my-Chree and Manannan."

In May 2016, the Isle of Man Steam Packet Company outlined plans to replace the Ben-my-Chree as part of their proposed Strategic Sea Services offer to the Isle of Man Government. Under the proposal, the 1998-built Ben-my-Chree would be "replaced by 2019–2021" with a new build vessel that would be 140-metres long and have a capacity of 800 passengers. The Ben-my-Chree would then be retained as a third vessel to offer cover to the fleet.

On 1 December 2020, the replacement for Ben-my-Chree was named MV Manxman. On Christmas Eve 2021 she was laid down at Hyundai Mipo Dockyard. Manxman entered service on 17 August 2023.
