= Kristjan Palusalu (ship) =

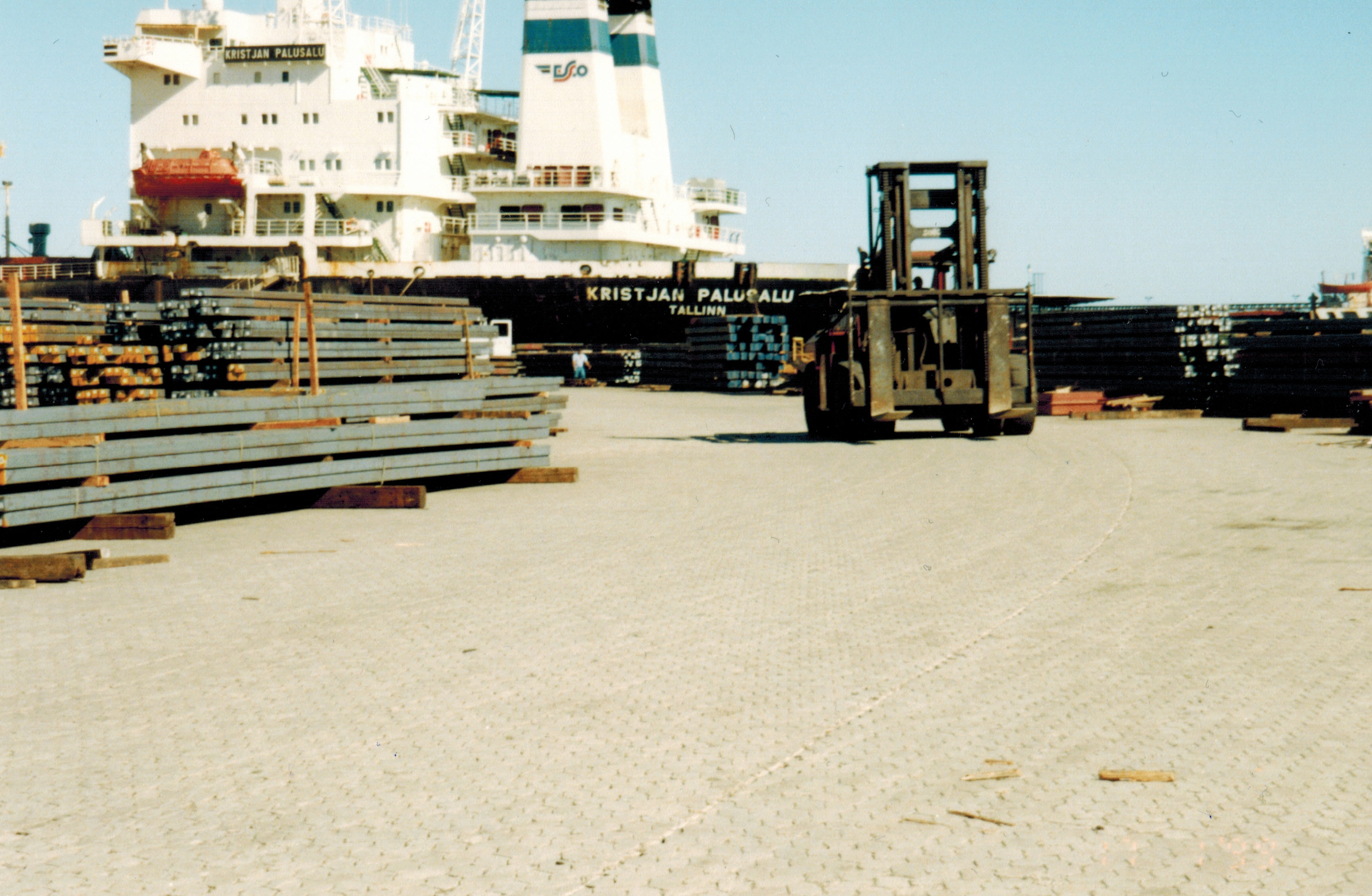
- Kristjan Palusalu in Brazil, Vitoria Praia Male in 1999

History
- Name: Kristjan Palusalu
- Owner: Estonian Shipping Company
- Port of registry: Estonia
- Builder: Mykolayiv Shipyard
- Launched: 1989
- Identification: Call sign: ESCA; IMO number: 8729840
- Fate: Scrapped
- Notes: Formerly Alex D

General characteristics
- Tonnage: 31,649 GT
- Length: 215.39 m (706 ft 8 in)
- Beam: 31.8 m (104 ft 4 in)
- Draught: 12.3 m (40 ft 4 in)
- Depth: 16.95 m (55 ft 7 in)
- Installed power: 9,500 kW (12,700 hp)
- Speed: 14.2 knots (26.3 km/h; 16.3 mph)
- Crew: 36 (1990)

'Kristjan Palusalu' was a bulk carrier that belonged to the Estonian Shipping Company. It was built in 1989 at the Mykolaiv Shipyard. The ship was named after Estonian wrestler Kristjan Palusalu. It was the first ship to sail around the world under the Estonian flag. The ship was later renamed Alex D and sailed under the flag of Malta.

== Trip around the world ==
From September 1991 to December 1992, Kristjan Palusalu traveled consecutively from Tampa, USA, to Qingdao, China, Singapore, Wallaroo and Giles in Australia, Dammam in Saudi Arabia, Durban in South Africa, Yakacık in Turkey, and Houston, United States. After this trip it was the first ship that has sailed around the world under Estonian flag. When Estonia regained independence in August 1991, the ship was far away from home. Upon hearing the news, the crew raised the Estonian flag and painted over the ship-owner's logo themselves.

== Incidents ==
On 29 February 1996, the ship ran aground between Germany and Denmark in the Kadetrenden sea pass. The incident was caused by an unexpectedly low water level, which was one meter below normal. After the water level rose by 55 cm, the ship continued its journey under its own power.

== Sister ships ==
- Aleksander Aberg
- Paul Keres
- Elmar Kivistik
