= Thames Europort =

Location
- Location: Stone, Kent, United Kingdom, DA2 6QB
- Coordinates: 51.4569°N 0.2642°E

Thames Europort is a roll-on/roll-off port facility at Stone in Kent, England, close to Dartford. The facility is situated on the southern side of the River Thames. The port was used solely for freight traffic, both trailer and container based but now mainly handles imports of Mercedes cars and vans. There is a large pontoon-type berth which can accommodate two ships for simultaneous loading and discharging. The terminal can accommodate vessels up to 236 metres (774 ft) in length, 32.2 metres (106 ft) beam and 11.5 metres (38 ft) draft.
