= MS Arrow =

RORO cargo ferry built in 1998

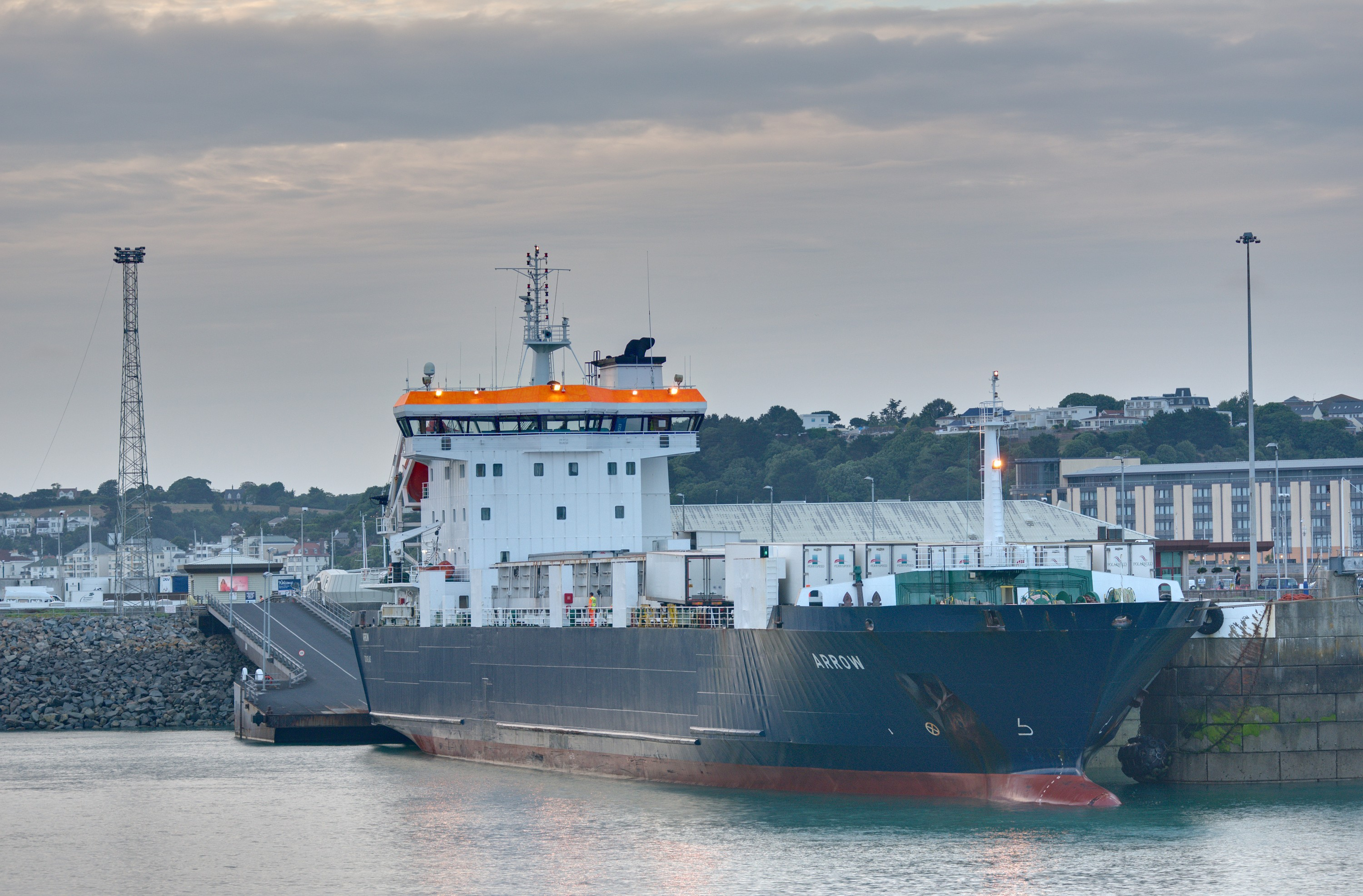
- MS Arrow docked at St Helier

History
- Name: Varbola (1998–99); Dart 6 (1999–2005); RR Arrow (2005–07); Arrow (since 2007)
- Owner: Estonian Shipping Company (1999–2005); Elmira Shipping & Trading (2005–07); Seatruck Ferries (2007–2022); Isle of Man Steam Packet Company (2022–present)
- Operator: Dart Line (1998–1999, 2003); Norse Merchant Ferries (1999–2006); Condor Ferries (2006, 2010, 2014, 2016); Norfolkline (2006–2009); Seatruck Ferries (2009–2012, 2014–2022); DFDS Seaways (2010, 2025); Isle of Man Steam Packet Company (2012–present)
- Port of registry: Tallinn, Estonia (1998–2005); Valletta, Malta (2005–2012); Douglas, Isle of Man (since 2012)
- Route: Dartford–Vlissingen (1998–99); Heysham–Dublin (1999–2003); Dartford–Dunkerque/Vlissingen (2003); Liverpool–Belfast (2003–04); Heysham–Dublin (2004–05); Portsmouth–Jersey–Guernsey (2005–06); Warrenpoint–Heysham (2009–2022); Douglas-Heysham (2023–2025); Portsmouth-Jersey (2025-present)
- Builder: Astilleros de Huelva SA, Huelva
- Yard number: 571
- Launched: August 1998
- Identification: IMO number: 9119414; MMSI Number 215951000; Callsign 9HGF8

General characteristics
- Class & type: R-class
- Tonnage: 7,606 GT; 2,282 NT; 5,758 DWT
- Length: 122.32 m (401 ft 4 in)
- Beam: 19.80 m (65 ft 0 in)
- Draught: 6.20 m (20 ft 4 in)
- Installed power: Two Wärtsilä 9R32 diesel engines, 7,400 kW (9,900 bhp)
- Speed: 16 knots (18 mph)
- Capacity: 12 passengers; 65 trailers

MV Arrow is a 7,606 GT Ro-Ro ferry built by Astilleros de Huelva SA, Huelva, Spain in 1998 as Varbola for the Estonian Shipping Company, Tallinn. During a charter to Dart Line she was renamed Dart 6, reverting to Varbola when the charter ended. In 2005, she was sold to Malta and renamed RR Arrow. In 2007, she was sold to Seatruck Ferries, Heysham and renamed Arrow. In September 2022, it was revealed that she had been bought by Isle of Man Steam Packet Company for an estimated €9 million.

== Description ==
Arrow is a RO-RO ferry, a sister ship to Clipper Ranger, Helliar and Hildasay.

She is 122.32 metres (401 ft 4 in) long, with a beam of 19.80 metres (65 ft 0 in) and a draught of 6.20 metres (20 ft 4 in). She has a total of 1,057 metres (1,156 yd) lane capacity, which means she can carry 88 trailers, with provision for 12 passengers. She is powered by two Wärtsilä 9R32 diesel engines, which produce a total of 7,400 kilowatts (9,900 bhp), giving her a speed of 17 knots (31 km/h).

== History ==
Varbola was built by Astilleros de Huelva, Huelva, Spain as yard number 571. She was built for Estonian Shipping Company, Tallinn. On 26 August 1998, she was chartered to Dart Line, Dartford for use on the Dartford–Vlissingen route. Varbola was renamed Dart 6 in January 1999. In September 1999, the charter ended and she reverted to Varbola. In October 1999, she was chartered to Merchant Ferries for use on the Heysham–Dublin route. In January 2003, Varbola was chartered to Dart Line for use on the Dartford–Vlissingen and Dartford–Dunkirk routes. In May 2003, she was chartered to Norse Merchant Ferries for use on the Liverpool–Belfast route, transferring to the Heysham–Dublin route in April 2004.

On 18 July 2005, Varbola was sold to Elmira Shipping & Trading, Piraeus and renamed RR Arrow. She was reflagged to Malta. On 23 December 2005, she was chartered to Condor Ferries for use between Portsmouth, Jersey and Guernsey. The charter ended on 14 January 2006, following which she entered service with Norfolk Line. On 30 October 2007, she was sold to Seatruck Ferries for €15,000,000. The ship was renamed Arrow in November. Following further service with Norfolk Line she was laid up at Liverpool in May 2009. Arrow re-entered service with Seatruck on 20 October 2009 on the Heysham–Dublin route.

In May 2012 and 2013, Arrow was chartered to the Isle of Man Steam Packet Company for the Isle of Man TT. In October 2013, the Steam Packet Company confirmed a three-year charter which commenced on 28 April 2014 with a purchase option. During the summer of 2014, while not required in Steam Packet Company service, the vessel was temporarily sub-chartered to operate between Jersey (Channel Islands) and Portsmouth (England). She resumed services in the Irish Sea in the winter.

In April 2015, Arrow was called in to cover freight traffic as the Isle of Man Steam Packet Company fast craft Manannan was out of service for nearly a week and Ben-my-Chree was required to carry as many passengers as possible.

On 18 March 2016, Arrow was called in to cover freight services to the Channel Islands for Condor Ferries as the regular vessel, Commodore Clipper, was covering routes while the Condor Liberation underwent repairs.

On 25 June 2020, while under subcharter to NorthLink Ferries, Arrow ran aground at the entrance to Aberdeen Harbour. She was freed by harbour tugs and continued to the quayside.

From 19 July 2021, she was chartered by Caledonian MacBrayne to carry freight on the busy Stornoway to Ullapool route, freeing Loch Seaforth to make additional passenger crossings. On 23 July 2021, damage caused by a rope getting wrapped in the ship's propeller resulted in the vessel being withdrawn from service. On 25 July 2021, she went to Belfast for repairs, arriving there on 27 July. Repairs were completed on 2 August and she returned to service from Stornoway on the following evening. The charter is due to end on 7 September. In December 2021, due to thick fog at Heysham causing several cancelled sailings for the Isle of Man Steam Packet in the week before Christmas, Arrow was brought in to help clear the backlog of freight, which allowed Ben-my-Chree to carry her full complement of passengers.

From 17 January to the end of March 2023, Arrow was chartered by Caledonian MacBrayne to assist with freight operations on the busy Stornoway to Ullapool route during the closure of the port at Uig. She was used only four times (18 February, 8, 15 and 16 March) when Loch Seaforth freight sailings were cancelled due to the weather conditions, and to substitute her when there was significant traffic.

On 30 October 2023, CalMac announced that Arrow would be chartered again for the Stornoway to Ullapool route, due to MV Alfred being unable to use the linkspan in Stornoway. The charter would initially run from 2 to 15 November, with CalMac looking to extend the contract beyond that time.

On 28 March 2025 she began a year long charter to DFDS Seaways operating from Portsmouth to St Helier, Jersey as the main freight vessel after DFDS won the contract to serve the island.
