= Dart (1799 ship) =

History

Great Britain
- Name: Dart
- Builder: Dartmouth
- Launched: 1799
- Fate: Wrecked 14 July 1804

General characteristics
- Tons burthen: 151 (bm)
- Complement: 20
- Armament: 12 × 6-pounder guns

Dart was launched at Dartmouth in 1799. Between 1800 and 1804 she made two complete voyages from Liverpool as a slave ship. She wrecked in 1804 early in the outward bound leg of her third slave voyage.

== Career ==
Dart first appeared in Lloyd's Register (LR) in 1799.

Year	Master	Owner	Trade	Source
1799	Crosby	Lake & Co.	Dartmouth–Liverpool	LR

1st slave trading voyage (1800–1801): Captain James Martin acquired a letter of marque on 6 May 1800. He sailed from Liverpool on 24 June 1800, bound for West Africa. Dart, [Edward] Crosby master, was reported to have arrived in Africa. Dart acquired some slaves at Cape Coast Castle, but the principal place where she purchased slaves was Lagos Onim. After having acquired her slaves, Dart stopped in at Prince's Island. She arrived at Demerara on 30 May 1801 with 190 slaves. She sailed from Demerara on 30 July and arrived back at Liverpool on 20 September. She had left Liverpool with 33 crew members and she had suffered seven crew deaths on the voyage.

2nd slave trading voyage (1802–1804): On this voyage Edward Crosby was her first master. He was replaced at some point by Thomas Curry, who in turn was replaced by Christopher Eskildon. Dart sailed from Liverpool on 6 January 1802. She purchased slaves at Lagos Onim; after having acquired her slaves, Dart stopped in at Prince's Island. She arrived at Demerara on 26 November 1802 with 190 slaves. She arrived back at Liverpool on 2 February 1804. She had left Liverpool with 21 Crew members and had suffered seven crew deaths on the voyage.

== Fate ==
Captain Thomas Bolland sailed from Liverpool on 21 June 1804, bound for West Africa. Lloyd's List reported that Dart, Boland, master, had been totally lost on 14 July off Cape Bajadore. Her crew was saved.
