= MS Hildasay =

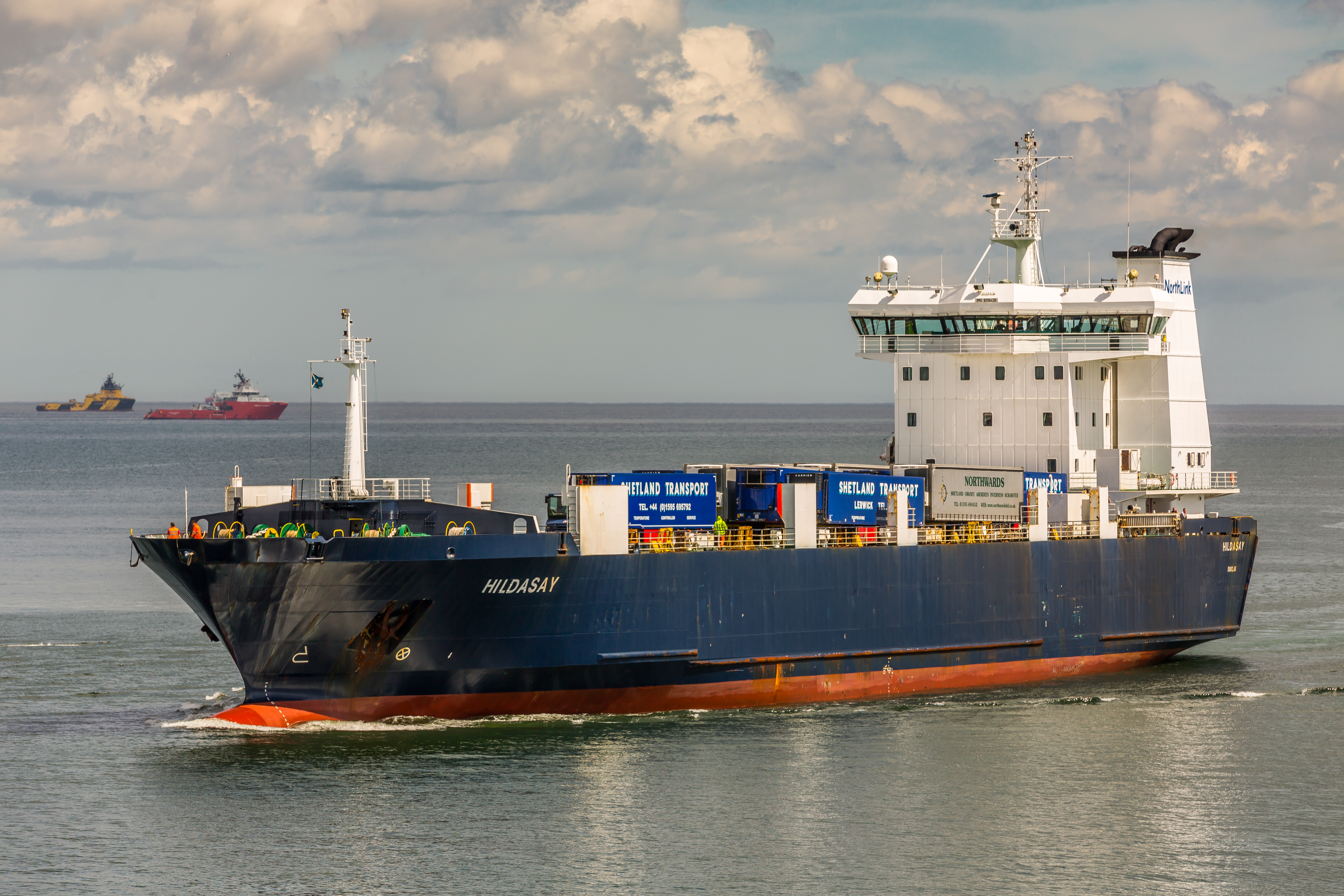
- Hildasay

History
- Name: Leili (1999-2002); Port Everglades Express (2002-2005); RR Shield (2005-07); Shield (2007 - 2010); Hildasay (Since 2010)
- Owner: Estonian Shipping Company (1999-2005); Elmira Shipping & Trading (2005-07); Attica Group (2007-08); Seatruck Ferries (2008-2019); Caledonian Maritime Assets (2019-)
- Operator: Estonian Shipping Company (1999-2002); Crowley Maritime (2002-04); Norse Merchant Ferries (2004-05); Irish Ferries (2005); Norfolkline (2006, 2008, 2009); NorthLink Ferries (Since 2010)
- Port of registry: (Isle of Man) Douglas
- Route: Aberdeen - Kirkwall - Lerwick
- Builder: Astilleros de Huelva, Huelva
- Yard number: 572
- Launched: 4 April 1999
- Identification: IMO number: 9119426; MMSI Number 235087121; Callsign 2EPP6

General characteristics
- Tonnage: 7,606 GT; 2,282 NT; 5,758 DWT
- Length: 122.32 m (401 ft 4 in)
- Beam: 19.80 m (65 ft 0 in)
- Draught: 6.20 m (20 ft 4 in)
- Ice class: Ice Class 1A
- Installed power: 2 x Wärtsilä 9R32 diesel engines, 7,400 kilowatts (9,900 hp)
- Speed: 17 knots (31 km/h)
- Capacity: 12 passengers, 88 trailers

Hildasay is a 7,606 GT roll-on/roll-off ferry which was built by Astilleros de Huelva, Spain in 1999 as Leili for the Estonian Shipping Company. During a charter to Crowley Maritime she was renamed Port Everglades Express, reverting to Leili when the charter ended. In 2005, she was sold to Greece and renamed RR Shield. In 2008, she was sold to Seatruck Ferries and renamed Shield. In January 2010 she was chartered to NorthLink Ferries and renamed Hildasay.

== Description ==
Hildasay is a roll-on/roll-off ferry, she is 122.32 metres (401 ft 4 in) long, with a beam of 19.80 metres (65 ft 0 in) and a draught of 6.20 metres (20 ft 4 in). She has a total of 1,057 metres (1,156 yd) lane capacity, which means she can carry 88 trailers, with provision for 12 passengers. She is powered by two Wärtsilä 9R32 diesel engines, which produce a total of 7,400 kilowatts (9,900 hp), giving her a speed of 17 knots (31 km/h).

== History ==
Varbola was built by Astilleros de Huelva, Huelva, Spain as yard number 572. She was built for the Estonian Shipping Company, Tallinn. Originally under the Estonian flag, she was reflagged to Cyprus in 2000. On 2 May 2002, she was chartered to Crowley Maritime, Jacksonville, Florida. Varbola was renamed Port Everglades Express for the duration of the charter. In October 2004, she reverted to Leili.

In October 2004, she was chartered to Norse Merchant Ferries for use on the Birkenhead - Dublin route. From 5–27 January 2005, Leili was chartered to Irish Ferries for use on the Pembroke - Rosslare routes. Following this, Leili was chartered to Norse Merchant Ferries for use on the Birkenhead - Dublin route, transferring to the Heysham - Dublin route in June 2005.

In July 2005, Varbola was sold to Elmira Shipping & Trading, Piraeus and renamed RR Shield. She was reflagged to Malta. Norse Merchant Ferries was taken over by Norfolk Line in 2006. In August 2006 she was sent to Gdańsk Shipyard, Poland for a refit. In September 2007 she was sold to Attica Enterprise, Piraeus, and was renamed Shield in October 2007. On 1 October 2008 she was sold to Seatruck Ferries, remaining on charter to Norfolkline.

In December 2009, she was chartered to NorthLink Ferries as a replacement for their freighter Hascosay. She was named Hildasay in a ceremony in Lerwick on 10 February 2010.

In 2012 she was reflagged to the Isle of Man. In 2019 the ship was purchased by Caledonian Maritime Assets.

== Sister vessels ==
- Arrow, built as Varbola.
- Clipper Ranger, built as Lembitu.
- Helliar, built as Lehola.
