= USS Dart =

USS Dart may refer to the following ships of the United States Navy:

- USS Dart (1861), a small schooner captured on 4 July 1861 during the American Civil War
- USS Dart (YFB-308), a ferry launch in service from 1900 to 1930
