= HD Hyundai Mipo =

South Korean shipbuilding company

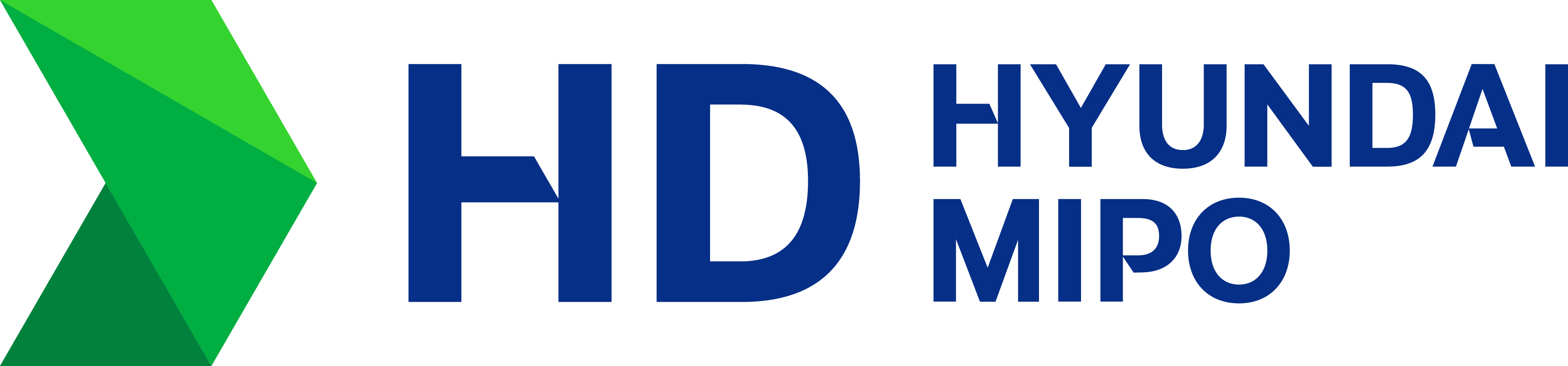
- Type: Public
- Industry: Shipbuilding
- Founded: 1975; 51 years ago
- Headquarters: Ulsan, South Korea
- Products: Container & Product Carrier, Muilt-purpose cargo Ship, Ferry, FPSO/FSO, Cable Laying Vessel, Pipe Laying, Drill-Ship, AHTS & Special Vessel..
- Number of employees: 3,593 (2015)
- Parent: HD Hyundai
- Website: www.hmd.co.kr

HD Hyundai Mipo (abbreviated: HMD; Korean: HD현대미포) is one of the largest shipbuilding companies with the world's largest share (50%) in PC (Product Carrier) segment. Since the 1980s, more than 10,000 ships were repaired and converted until 2005 and 400 newly ordered ships were delivered until 2009. It delivers about 70 new ships in a year. The delivered amount is over 1 million compensated gross tonnage (CGT) in a year (2007), making it 4th in the world. Its product mix is shipbuilding (96.4%) and conversion and repair (3.6%). It is a member of HD Hyundai and was listed on KOSPI (Korea Composite Stock Price Index) in 1983.

In late 2025, HD Hyundai Heavy Industries (HHI) merged with HD Hyundai Mipo (HMD) to create a unified entity aimed at solidifying its position as the world’s top shipbuilder. The merger, approved in August 2025 and completed by December 2025, makes HHI the surviving company, combining HMD's mid-sized vessel expertise with HHI’s large ship production.

== Founding ==
- 1975 04 Founded on the HHI premises
- 1982 12 Constructed New Shipyard at Present Location
- 1983 12 listed on KOSPI (Korea Composite Stock Price Index)
- 1999 04 completed Hyundai-Vinashin Shipyard in Vietnam
- 2003 12 MR PC, Selected as 'World-Class Product'
- 2005 04 completed Daebul Factory in Junnam, South Korea
- 2005 12 completed Jangsaengpo Factory in Ulsan, South Korea
- 2006 12 Sub-Panamax Containership, Selected as 'World-Class Product'
- 2008 12 Won US Dollars 2 Billion Export Prize
- 2009 12 Awarded 3 Billion US dollars Export Prize
- 2010 10 Acquired a Greenhouse Gas Inspection Certificate

== Shipbuilding ==
- 1983 11 Built Cable Layer (ITM Venturer) for UK
- 1986 10 Built Reefer Vessel (Summer Sky) for USA
- 1997 12 Delivered FPSO (Ramform Banf) for Norway
- 2001 02 Delivered Pipe Laying Ship (CSO Deep Blue) for France
- 2002 05 Delivered car ferry (Seonghee) for Korea
- 2009 04 Delivered 400th new ordered ships
- 2011 01 HVS entered into newbuilding business
- 2013 07 Delivered the 700th newbuild vessel
- 2014 01 Delivered Platform Supply Vessel for BP
- 2020 07 Order for passenger/vehicle ferry (MV Manxman) for Isle of Man Steam Packet Company

== Conversion and repair ==
- 1980 12 Received 3 Conversion Ships (from CMCR)
- 1981 01 Received 8 Conversion Ships (from OOCL)
- 1981 12 Received 2 LNG Conversion Ships
- 1984 06 Entering 2,000th Repair Ships to Docks
- 1987 10 Entering 3,000th Repair Ships to Docks
- 1995 02 Delivered 2,000th Conversion Ships
- 1995 10 Repaired 6,000th Ships
- 2005 04 Repaired 8,000th Ships

== Awards ==
- 1999 Shiprepair Yard Award by Lloyd's List Maritime Asia
- 2000 Shiprepair Yard Award by Lloyd's List Maritime Asia
- 2001 The Shipbuilding Award by Lloyd's List Maritime Asia
- 2002 Shiprepair Yard Award by Lloyd's List Maritime Asia
- 2003 MR PC, Selected as 'World-Class Product'
- 2004 Best Management Practices by AsiaMoney
- 2006 Sub-Panamax Containership, Selected as 'World-Class Product'
- 2008 Won US Dollars 2 Billion Export Prize
- 2009 Awarded 3 Billion US dollards Export Prize
- 2012 Con-Ro Carrier, Selected as 'World-Class Product' by the Korean Government
- 2013 Asphalt Carrier, Selected as 'World-Class Product' by the Korean Government

== Quality ==
- 1997 ISO 9001
- 2000 ISO 9001
- 2003 ISO 14001 by LRQA (Lloyd's Register Quality Assurance)
- 2003 OHSAS 18001 (Occupational Health & Safety Management System)

== See also ==
- HD Hyundai Heavy Industries
- HD Hyundai
- Ulsan Hyundai Mipo Dockyard Dolphin FC
