= Dart (1801 ship) =

UK whaler and merchant ship 1801–1811

History
- Builder: Ostend
- Launched: 1792

United Kingdom
- Name: Dart
- Owner: J. M'Kenzie or M'Neilage
- Captured: 1805
- Fate: Last listed in 1811

General characteristics
- Type: Fully rigged ship
- Tons burthen: 171, or 173 (bm)
- Propulsion: Sail
- Complement: 1801:50; 1804:30
- Armament: 1801:14 × 12-pounder guns; 1804:2 × 4-pounder guns + 8 × 12-pounder carronades

Dart was a brig or snow built at Ostend in 1792. She entered British records in 1801 and then made two whaling voyages to the southern whale fishery, but was captured during the second. However, she remained in her master's hands and continued to sail in the South Seas, being last listed in 1811.

== British career ==
Dart first appears in Lloyd's Register in 1801 with Chetty, master, Captain & Co., owner, and trade London-Malta. Michael Chitty received a letter of marque for Dart on 3 January 1801.

Her first whaling voyage saw Dart sail from Britain on 9 July 1802 under the command of Captain Donald McLennan (or M'Lennan). She arrived at Port Jackson from "Chilli". At Port Jackson she purchased some 2,000 salted seal skins from Endeavour, which had been sealing around New Zealand. Also, while at Port Jackson, McLennan signed an agreement with Governor Philip Gidley King to deliver an officer and six soldiers to Hobart. Dart left on 24 October, with ultimate destination "Chilli". She returned to Britain on 9 July 1804. Her cargo is listed as consisting of seal skins, with no mention of whale oil. On her return McLennan reported on the state of affairs in Otaheite to the directors of the London Missionary Society.

Captain McLennan received a letter of marque on 7 September 1804. He sailed from Britain on 24 September 1804, bound for the Pacific Ocean. Dart was reported to have been off the coast of Brazil in January 1805. In November she was reported to have been captured. Britannia reported that three or four British whalers, Dart among them, had been detained in Guayaquil, due to the resumption in 1804 of the Anglo-Spanish War. A further report on 31 December stated that she had been captured at Guayaquil and that she had suffered the loss of 15 of her crew killed or wounded.

== Fate ==
However, by means that remain obscure, McLennan remained her master. Dart is recorded as arriving at Sydney on 8 March 1807 from England, with merchandise, and sailing for England on 20 April 1808. Lloyd's Register last lists her in 1810 as continuing to be sailing to the South Seas. The Register of Shipping last lists Dart, M'Lenan, master, M'Kenzie, owner, with trade London—South Seas, in 1811.
