= CTMA Voyaguer 2 =

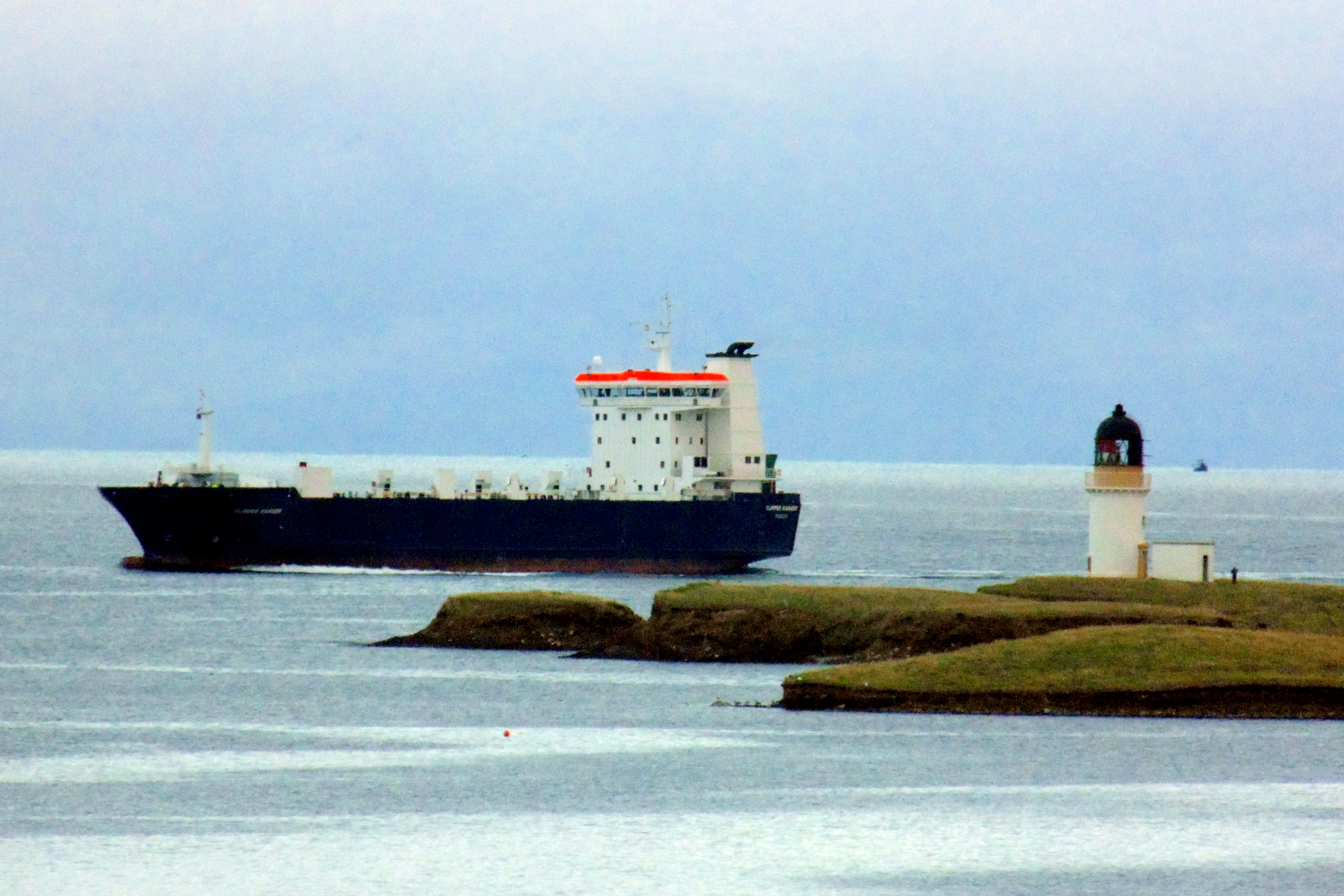
- Clipper Ranger passing Arnish lighthouse near Stornoway on 19 September 2013

History
- Name: Dart 7 (January 1999); Lembitu (September 1999); Celtic Sun (March 2000); Lembitu (October 2001); RR Challenge (April 2005); Challenge (October 2007); Clipper Ranger (June 2008); CTMA Voyaguer 2 (December 2019-Present)
- Owner: Until 2019: Challenge Shipping Co.; December 2019 - present: Coopérative de Transport Maritime et Aérien (CTMA)
- Operator: Until 2019: Seatruck Ferries; 2013 - 2015: Caledonian MacBrayne (Charter); July 2019 - December 2019: Coopérative de Transport Maritime et Aérien (CTMA) (Charter); December 2019 - present: Coopérative de Transport Maritime et Aérien (CTMA)
- Port of registry: 1998–2005: Tallinn, Estonia; 2005–2013: Valletta, Malta; 2013-2019: Douglas, Isle of Man; 2019- present: Cap-aux-Meules, Canada
- Route: until late 2012: Heysham–Belfast route; 2013-2015: Stornoway–Ullapool route; Late 2015-2019: Heysham–Belfast route; July 2019: Souris–Cap-aux-Meules route, Gulf of St. Lawrence, Canada
- Ordered: 20 September 1994
- Builder: Astilleros de Huelva, Huelva, Spain
- Yard number: 571
- Laid down: 13 May 1996
- Launched: 21 June 1997
- Completed: 4 April 1998
- Identification: Call sign: 2GFG4; IMO number: 9119402; MMSI number: 235096891
- Status: In service

General characteristics
- Class & type: R Class
- Tonnage: 7,606 GT; 2,282 NT; 5,758 DWT
- Length: 122.32 m (401 ft 4 in)
- Beam: 19.80 m (65 ft 0 in)
- Draught: 6.21 m (20 ft 4 in)
- Installed power: 7,400 kilowatts (9,900 hp) total
- Propulsion: Main: 2 x 9 cylinder Wärtsilä 9R32 diesel engines.; Auxiliary: 2 x 600 kilowatts (800 hp) SACM Wärtsilä engines.; 600 kilowatts (800 hp) Ulstein bow thruster
- Speed: 17 knots (31 km/h)
- Capacity: 12 passengers, 88 trailers
- Crew: 20

MV CTMA Voyaguer 2 is a freight ferry built in 1998, owned and operated by Coopérative de Transport Maritime et Aérien (CTMA) on the Souris to Cap-aux-Meules route.

She was owned by Seatruck Ferries from 2005 to 2019. In September 2013, she was chartered to Caledonian MacBrayne for the freight service between Ullapool and Stornoway. In 2019 she was chartered then bought by CTMA and transferred across the Atlantic to Canada.

== History ==
MS Lembitu was built by Astilleros de Huelva and launched in 1998 for the Estonian Shipping Co., Tallinn. She was named after Lembitu of Lehola, a 12th-century Estonian leader. On 20 April 1998 she was chartered by P&O European Ferries for use in the Irish Sea.

On 2 September 1998 she was chartered by Dart Line for use on the Dartford–Vlissingen route and renamed Dart 7 in January 1999.

On 15 September 1999 she was chartered by International Atlantic Line for use on the Southampton–Bayonne route and renamed Lembitu once again. In November 1999 she was chartered by Unknown Operator for use between Marseille and North Africa.

In March 2000 she was chartered by P&O Irish Sea Freight for use on the Liverpool–Dublin route, and renamed Celtic Sun. In October 2001 the charter ended and she reverted to the name Lembitu once again, being chartered by Norse Merchant Ferries for use on the Heysham–Dublin route. In December 2001 she returned to Estonian Shipping Co., and was put into service on the Tallinn–Helsinki–Rostock route. She was then in service with Scandlines on the same route.

In January 2005, she was chartered by Channel Freight Ferries for use on the Southampton to Radicatel route. In March 2005 she was chartered by Norse Merchant Ferries for use on the Belfast–Heysham route. In April 2005 she was sold to Elmira Shipping of Piraeus, Greece and in the same month was registered under the Maltese flag for Challenge Shipping Ltd., Valletta, Malta, being renamed RR Challenge at the same time.

In 2005 she was chartered by Seatruck Ferries for use on the Heysham–Warrenpoint route. She was sold to Attica Enterprise of Piraeus in September 2005 and purchased by Seatruck on 1 October 2005, being renamed Challenge at the same time. She was registered to Challenge Shipping Co. Ltd on behalf of Clipper Denmark A/S on 13 February 2008. Challenge was renamed Clipper Ranger in 2008 and was subsequently put on the Heysham–Larne route.

In April 2012, Seatruck announced that the Heysham–Larne service would be closed, and on 7 May 2012, Clipper Ranger made her last departure from Larne, and was placed onto Seatruck's new Heysham–Belfast route.

Clipper Ranger was withdrawn from service and laid up in Birkenhead, Liverpool for the latter half of 2012 and remained alongside in January 2013.

It was announced on Wednesday 13 March 2013 that Clipper Ranger was being chartered by P&O Ferries on the Liverpool to Dublin route from Monday 25 March 2013.

=== Caledonian MacBrayne ===
On 10 September 2013, it was announced that Clipper Ranger was to replace MV Muirneag on the freight ferry run from Stornoway to Ullapool. She is chartered to operate the service until August 2014, when the new Loch Seaforth will take over the Lewis service, replacing both MV Isle of Lewis and Clipper Ranger. After undertaking berthing trials at both Stornoway and Ullapool on 19 September, she began her charter on 21 September. On 28 January 2014, Clipper Ranger collided with a pier at Stornoway, causing damage to the ship's hull.

=== CTMA ===
In July 2019 Clipper Ranger began a charter to Coopérative de Transport Maritime et Aérien (CTMA) for the Souris to Cap-aux-Meules route on the Gulf of St. Lawrence, Canada. This charter was meant to last one year and had a condition for the purchase of the vessel. On 17 December 2019 CTMA announced that they had purchased Clipper Ranger for $11.5 million. The vessel was also renamed to CTMA Voyageur 2 and changed to a Canadian flag.

== Sister vessels ==
- Arrow, built as Varbola.
- Helliar, built as Lehola.
- Hildasay, built as Leili.
